= 2019 FIBA Basketball World Cup qualification (Europe) =

2019 FIBA Basketball World Cup
European Qualification

Tournament details
- Dates: 2 August 2017 – 25 February 2019
- Teams: 37

Official website
- European qualifiers website European pre-qualifiers website

The 2019 FIBA Basketball World Cup qualification for the FIBA Europe region, began in August 2017 and concluded in February 2019. Contrary to previous years, no teams were automatically placed into the World Cup, so all FIBA Europe nations had to participate in qualification.

== Format ==
FIBA Europe was allocated 12 berths at the World Cup. In total, 37 FIBA Europe teams took part in the qualification tournament. The qualification consisted of the following stages:

- Pre-Qualifiers: 13 teams that did not participate in EuroBasket 2017 took part. Eight teams had qualified for the first round. The remaining five teams were eliminated from the World Cup qualification and transferred to the first pre-qualifying round of EuroBasket 2021 qualification.
- First round: 24 teams that participated in EuroBasket 2017 and eight teams that advanced from Pre-Qualifiers were organized into eight groups of four. The top three teams of each group qualified for the second round. The remaining eight teams played at the second pre-qualifying round of EuroBasket 2021 qualification.
- Second round: The top 24 teams from the first round were organised into four groups of six, with results carried over from the first round. The top three teams of each group qualified for the World Cup. All 24 participants of the second round, automatically qualified for the EuroBasket 2021 qualification.

== Schedule ==
The schedule of the competition was as follows.

Stage	Matchday	Dates
Pre-Qualifiers	Matchday 1	2 August 2017
Pre-Qualifiers	Matchday 2	5 August 2017
Pre-Qualifiers	Matchday 3	9 August 2017
Pre-Qualifiers	Matchday 4	12 August 2017
Pre-Qualifiers	Matchday 5	16 August 2017
Pre-Qualifiers	Matchday 6	19 August 2017
First round	Matchday 1	24 November 2017
First round	Matchday 2	26–27 November 2017
First round	Matchday 3	23 February 2018
First round	Matchday 4	25–26 February 2018
First round	Matchday 5	28–29 June 2018
First round	Matchday 6	1–2 July 2018
Second round	Matchday 1	13–14 September 2018
Second round	Matchday 2	16–17 September 2018
Second round	Matchday 3	29–30 November 2018
Second round	Matchday 4	2–3 December 2018
Second round	Matchday 5	21–22 February 2019
Second round	Matchday 6	24–25 February 2019

== Pre-qualifiers ==
Teams that did not manage or did not apply to make EuroBasket 2017 played in the pre-qualifiers round. 13 teams participated in four home-and-away round robin groups, from 2 to 19 August 2017. Armenia made its debut in FIBA international competitions, while teams such as Denmark, Switzerland, Luxembourg and Cyprus did not participate in 2019 FIBA Basketball World Cup campaign. The draw to determine the groups was held in Prague, Czech Republic, on 10 December 2016.

The top two teams from each group qualified for the First round, determining the last eight spots in Division A. The other five teams (the bottom two teams from Group A + the bottom team from Groups B, C, and D) have been eliminated from the FIBA Basketball World Cup, and played in Division B of EuroBasket 2021 qualifying, starting with the pre-qualifiers first round.

=== Seeding ===
Pre-qualifiers were drawn on 10 December 2016. Seeding was based on the EuroBasket 2017 qualification record.

Team	Position in the group	Position in the draw	Record
Netherlands	2nd in 2017 qualification group B	1	2–2, -16
Bosnia and Herzegovina	2nd in 2017 qualification group C	2	2-2, -35
Estonia	2nd in 2017 qualification group D	3	1-3, -42
Belarus	3rd in 2017 qualification group D	4	2-2, -12
Austria	3rd in 2017 qualification group B	5	1-3, -21
Sweden	3rd in 2017 qualification group C	6	0-4, -21
Bulgaria	3rd in 2017 qualification group E	7	0-4, -42
North Macedonia	3rd in 2017 qualification group G	8	0-4, -56
Slovakia	3rd in 2017 qualification group F	9	0-4, -128
Portugal	4th in 2017 qualification group D	10	1-5, -55
Albania	4th in 2017 qualification group F	11	1-5, -139
Kosovo	4th in 2017 qualification group E	12	0-6, -127
Armenia	Did not apply for EuroBasket 2017	13	-

Notes

1. ^{†} For teams finished higher than 4th place a group, results against 4th placed teams are discarded.

Pot 1
Team	Pos
Netherlands	1
Bosnia and Herzegovina	2
Estonia	3
Belarus	4

Pot 2
Team	Pos
Austria	5
Sweden	6
Bulgaria	7
Macedonia	8

Pot 3
Team	Pos
Slovakia	9
Portugal	10
Albania	11
Kosovo	12

Pot 4
Team	Pos
Armenia	13

All times are local.

=== Group A ===
Pos	Team	Pld	W	L	PF	PA	PD	Pts	Qualification
1	Sweden	6	4	2	476	447	+29	10 (Note: Sweden 2–0, Bosnia and Herzegovina 0–2)	Advance to the first round
2	Bosnia and Herzegovina	6	4	2	502	465	+37	10	Advance to the first round
3	Armenia	6	3	3	470	482	−12	9	Relegated to the EuroBasket Pre-Qualifiers first round
4	Slovakia	6	1	5	434	488	−54	7	Relegated to the EuroBasket Pre-Qualifiers first round

Source: FIBA
Rules for classification: 1) Points; 2) Head-to-head results; 3) Points difference; 4) Points scored.
Notes:

2 August 2017	Sweden	81–73	Bosnia and Herzegovina	Norrköping
18:00	Scoring by quarter: 20–23, 18–15, 17–23, 26–12
	Pts: Eriksson 25; Rebs: Eriksson 5 Asts: Massamba 6	Boxscore	Pts: Musa 17; Rebs: Vrabac 9 Asts: Renfroe 3	Arena: Stadium Arena; Attendance: 2,223; Referees: Tomas Jasevičius (LTU), Fernando Calatrava (ESP), Anastasios Piloidis (GRE)

2 August 2017	Armenia	75–61	Slovakia	Yerevan
19:00	Scoring by quarter: 15–20, 31–10, 13–9, 16–22
	Pts: Hess 22; Rebs: Fischer 9 Asts: Boatright 6	Boxscore	Pts: Rančík 20; Rebs: Jones 9 Asts: Jones 4	Arena: Mika Sports Arena; Attendance: 1,000; Referees: Erez Gurion (ISR), Gianluca Mattioli (ITA), Arnis Ozols (LAT)

5 August 2017	Armenia	82–69	Sweden	Yerevan
19:00	Scoring by quarter: 21–23, 22–19, 13–16, 26–11
	Pts: Boatright 23; Rebs: Fischer 12; Asts: Boatright 3	Boxscore	Pts: Eriksson 15; Rebs: Gaddefors 7 Asts: Borg 4	Arena: Mika Sports Arena; Attendance: 1,000; Referees: Sergiy Chebyshev (UKR), Pavel Fuška (SVK), Vilius Mačiulaitis (LTU)

5 August 2017	Bosnia and Herzegovina	84–71	Slovakia	Sarajevo
20:00	Scoring by quarter: 18–20, 20–13, 26–18, 20–20
	Pts: Musa 32; Rebs: Lazić 7 Asts: 4 players 3	Boxscore	Pts: Rančík 14; Rebs: Rančík 8 Asts: Ihring 7	Arena: Mirza Delibašić Hall; Attendance: 3,000; Referees: Lorenzo Baldini (ITA), Sébastien Clivaz (SUI), Petar Denkovski (MKD)

9 August 2017	Slovakia	68–59	Sweden	Bratislava
18:00	Scoring by quarter: 17–12, 14–18, 23–11, 14–18
	Pts: three players 15; Rebs: Rančík 15; Asts: Krajčovič 4	Boxscore	Pts: Ramstedt 13; Rebs: Lindqvist 8 Asts: Massamba 5	Arena: Hant Arena; Attendance: 500; Referees: Anastasios Piloidis (GRE), Luka Kardum (CRO), Marko Vladić (AUT)

9 August 2017	Bosnia and Herzegovina	98–85	Armenia	Sarajevo
20:00	Scoring by quarter: 23–23, 29–21, 21–16, 25–25
	Pts: Musa 28; Rebs: Sejfić 5 Asts: Renfroe 6	Boxscore	Pts: Boatright 30; Rebs: Boatright, Chrabascz 7 Asts: Boatright 8	Arena: Mirza Delibašić Hall; Attendance: 4,500; Referees: Srđan Dožai (CRO), Gentian Cici (ALB), Radomir Vojinović (MNE)

12 August 2017	Slovakia	78–92	Armenia	Bratislava
18:00	Scoring by quarter: 22–21, 11–25, 23–23, 22–23
	Pts: Baťka 23; Rebs: Ihring 12; Asts: Ihring 5	Boxscore	Pts: Boatright 22; Rebs: Fischer 8 Asts: Boatright 4	Arena: Hant Arena; Attendance: 617; Referees: Marek Cmikiewicz (POL), Rune Larsen (DEN), Gintaras Vitkauskas (LTU)

12 August 2017	Bosnia and Herzegovina	72–88	Sweden	Zenica
19:00	Scoring by quarter: 23–23, 13–21, 19–20, 17–24
	Pts: Musa 12; Rebs: Atić, Tomić 5 Asts: three players 3	Boxscore	Pts: Massamba 20; Rebs: Spires 8 Asts: Massamba, Person 4	Arena: Arena Zenica; Attendance: 6,000; Referees: Antonio Conde (ESP), Boris Krejič (SLO), Paulo Marques (POR)

16 August 2017	Slovakia	74–92	Bosnia and Herzegovina	Bratislava
18:00	Scoring by quarter: 22–30, 23–25, 8–25, 21–12
	Pts: Rančík 19; Rebs: Ihring 6 Asts: Žiak 5	Boxscore	Pts: Musa 27; Rebs: Atić 7 Asts: Musa, Gegić 3	Arena: Hant Arena; Attendance: 350; Referees: Saverio Lanzarini (ITA), Sergey Krug (RUS), Mart Uuehendrik (EST)

16 August 2017	Sweden	93–70	Armenia	Uppsala
19:00	Scoring by quarter: 23–10, 33–22, 17–18, 20–20
	Pts: Borg 16; Rebs: Spires 9 Asts: Gaddefors 5	Boxscore	Pts: Boatright 32; Rebs: Boatright, Fischer 8 Asts: Boatright 5	Arena: IFU Arena; Attendance: 1,820; Referees: Vicente Bultó (ESP), Vincent Delestrée (BEL), Alexandru Olaru (ROU)

19 August 2017	Sweden	86–82	Slovakia	Uppsala
16:00	Scoring by quarter: 17–20, 27–19, 23–17, 19–26
	Pts: Gaddefors 17; Rebs: Spires 13; Asts: Massamba 6	Boxscore	Pts: Ihring 20; Rebs: Fusek 9 Asts: Jones 4	Arena: IFU Arena; Attendance: 1,678; Referees: Tomas Jasevičius (LTU), Arnis Ozols (LAT), Dariusz Zapolski (POL)

19 August 2017	Armenia	66–83	Bosnia and Herzegovina	Yerevan
19:00	Scoring by quarter: 25–24, 16–20, 21–21, 4–18
	Pts: Boatright 22; Rebs: Fischer 7 Asts: Boatright 9	Boxscore	Pts: Musa 21; Rebs: Atić 6 Asts: Zahiragić, Vrabac 3	Arena: Mika Sports Arena; Attendance: 1,500; Referees: Panagiotis Anastopoulos (GRE), Marius Ciulin (ROU), Zafer Yılmaz (TUR)

=== Group B ===
Pos	Team	Pld	W	L	PF	PA	PD	Pts	Qualification
1	Netherlands	4	3	1	352	264	+88	7	Advance to the first round
2	Austria	4	3	1	326	264	+62	7	Advance to the first round
3	Albania	4	0	4	228	378	−150	4	Relegated to the EuroBasket Pre-Qualifiers first round

Source: FIBA
Rules for classification: 1) Points; 2) Head-to-head results; 3) Points difference; 4) Points scored.

2 August 2017	Albania	51–79	Austria	Tirana
20:30	Scoring by quarter: 10–16, 11–24, 19–17, 11–22
	Pts: Shima 10; Rebs: Hysenagolli 5 Asts: Strazimiri 4	Boxscore	Pts: Mahalbašić 22; Rebs: Lanegger 8 Asts: Lanegger 4	Arena: Tirana Olympic Park; Attendance: 500; Referees: Tolga Sahin (ITA), Anastasios Manos (GRE), Zafer Yılmaz (TUR)

5 August 2017	Austria	72–79	Netherlands	Schwechat
19:30	Scoring by quarter: 18–15, 14–23, 16–17, 24–24
	Pts: Pöltl 24; Rebs: Pöltl, Mahalbašić 5 Asts: Lanegger 6	Boxscore	Pts: de Jong 22; Rebs: de Jong, Norel 5 Asts: Williams 6	Arena: Multiversum; Attendance: 2,000; Referees: Marek Ćmikiewicz (POL), Bojan Jovanić (BIH), Apostolos Kalpakas (SWE)

9 August 2017	Netherlands	91–77	Albania	Amsterdam
20:00	Scoring by quarter: 24–26, 27–27, 21–13, 19–11
	Pts: Voorn 20; Rebs: de Jong 7 Asts: Williams 6	Boxscore	Pts: Shima 23; Rebs: Hysenagolli 6 Asts: Shima, Dusha 4	Arena: Sporthallen Zuid; Attendance: 1,500; Referees: Dariusz Zapolski (POL), Pavel Fuška (SVK), Ernad Karović (BIH)

12 August 2017	Austria	97–63	Albania	Schwechat
16:00	Scoring by quarter: 33–19, 15–18, 28–14, 21–12
	Pts: Mahalbašić 25; Rebs: Mahalbašić 9 Asts: Lanegger 7	Boxscore	Pts: Moser 20; Rebs: Shima 4 Asts: Bushati 4	Arena: Multiversum; Attendance: 1,300; Referees: Saverio Lanzarini (ITA), Stanislav Kučera (CZE), Mart Uuehendrik (EST)

16 August 2017	Netherlands	71–78	Austria	Amsterdam
22:00	Scoring by quarter: 20–17, 17–22, 16–10, 18–29
	Pts: Slagter 15; Rebs: Norel 6 Asts: Kloof 8	Boxscore	Pts: Pöltl 16; Rebs: Mahalbašić 6 Asts: Klepeisz 10	Arena: Sporthallen Zuid; Attendance: 1,100; Referees: Antonio Conde (ESP), Gianluca Mattioli (ITA), Gavin Williams (WAL)

19 August 2017	Albania	37–111	Netherlands	Tirana
20:30	Scoring by quarter: 16–14, 8–30, 5–33, 8–34
	Pts: Moser 8 Rebs: Moser 6 Asts: Strazimiri 3	Boxscore	Pts: Norel 16; Rebs: Norel 11; Asts: Williams 6	Arena: Tirana Olympic Park; Attendance: 300; Referees: Saša Maričić (SRB), Boris Krejić (SLO), Özlem Yalman (TUR)

=== Group C ===
Pos	Team	Pld	W	L	PF	PA	PD	Pts	Qualification
1	Estonia	4	3	1	299	266	+33	7	Advance to the first round
2	Kosovo	4	2	2	271	300	−29	6	Advance to the first round
3	Macedonia	4	1	3	296	300	−4	5	Relegated to the EuroBasket Pre-Qualifiers first round

Source: FIBA
Rules for classification: 1) Points; 2) Head-to-head results; 3) Points difference; 4) Points scored.

2 August 2017	Kosovo	72–68	Macedonia	Pristina
20:15	Scoring by quarter: 23–11, 17–9, 15–23, 17–25
	Pts: Berisha 28; Rebs: F. Rugova 7 Asts: Mekaj 5	Boxscore	Pts: Theodore 22; Rebs: Čekovski 4 Asts: Theodore 6	Arena: Palace of Youth and Sports; Attendance: 2,500; Referees: Petar Obradović (BIH), Borys Shulga (UKR), Nikolaos Somos (GRE)

5 August 2017	Macedonia	76–80	Estonia	Skopje
20:30	Scoring by quarter: 29–17, 13–26, 19–20, 15–17
	Pts: Stojanovski 26; Rebs: Čekovski, Theodore 6 Asts: Kostoski 5	Boxscore	Pts: Veideman 26; Rebs: Talts 8 Asts: Sokk 5	Arena: Boris Trajkovski Sports Center; Attendance: 1,500; Referees: Fernando Calatrava (ESP), Paulo Marques (POR), Zdenko Tomašovič (SVK)

9 August 2017	Estonia	76–50	Kosovo	Tallinn
18:30	Scoring by quarter: 17–15, 23–14, 20–12, 16–9
	Pts: Hallik 15; Rebs: Puidet, Talts 6 Asts: Kangur 8	Boxscore	Pts: Kastrati 11; Rebs: Veseli 6 Asts: Berisha 4	Arena: Saku Suurhall; Attendance: 3,000; Referees: Apostolos Kalpakas (SWE), Vincent Delestrée (BEL), Mārtiņš Kozlovskis (LAT)

12 August 2017	Macedonia	87–74	Kosovo	Skopje
20:30	Scoring by quarter: 19–22, 21–19, 23–13, 24–20
	Pts: Theodore 24; Rebs: Theodore 9 Asts: Kostoski 5	Boxscore	Pts: F. Rugova 17; Rebs: Shoshi 6 Asts: Berisha 7	Arena: Boris Trajkovski Sports Center; Attendance: 500; Referees: Tolga Sahin (ITA), Marius Ciulin (ROU), Dariusz Zapolski (POL)

16 August 2017	Estonia	74–65	Macedonia	Tallinn
18:30	Scoring by quarter: 16–18, 25–23, 13–14, 20–10
	Pts: Sokk 15; Rebs: Kangur 12; Asts: Veideman 4	Boxscore	Pts: Theodore 19; Rebs: Stojanovski 8 Asts: Theodore 6	Arena: Saku Suurhall; Attendance: 3,500; Referees: Tomas Jasevičius (LTU), Juris Kokainis (LAT), Manuel Mazzoni (ITA)

19 August 2017	Kosovo	75–69	Estonia	Pristina
20:15	Scoring by quarter: 24–22, 11–16, 19–14, 21–17
	Pts: Berisha 28; Rebs: Shoshi 10; Asts: Berisha 6	Boxscore	Pts: Jõesaar 13; Rebs: Paasoja, Talts 5 Asts: Paasoja 5	Arena: Palace of Youth and Sports; Attendance: 2,500; Referees: Srđan Dožai (CRO), Markos Michaelides (SUI), Marko Vučković (SLO)

=== Group D ===
Pos	Team	Pld	W	L	PF	PA	PD	Pts	Qualification
1	Bulgaria	4	4	0	335	274	+61	8	Advance to the first round
2	Belarus	4	1	3	294	316	−22	5 (Note: Belarus 1–1, +2, Portugal 1–1, –2)	Advance to the first round
3	Portugal	4	1	3	290	329	−39	5	Advance to the EuroBasket Pre-Qualifiers first round

Source: FIBA
Rules for classification: 1) Points; 2) Head-to-head results; 3) Points difference; 4) Points scored.
Notes:

2 August 2017	Portugal	71–82	Bulgaria	Sines
18:30	Scoring by quarter: 16–26, 10–25, 24–20, 21–11
	Pts: Barbosa 11; Rebs: Djukic 6 Asts: Pinto 2	Boxscore	Pts: Bost 23; Rebs: Vezenkov 13; Asts: Vezenkov 5	Arena: Pavilhão dos Desportos de Sines; Attendance: 2,000; Referees: Vicente Bultó (ESP), Lorenzo Baldini (ITA), Janusz Calik (POL)

5 August 2017	Bulgaria	78–68	Belarus	Botevgrad
18:00	Scoring by quarter: 22–14, 13–15, 22–18, 21–21
	Pts: P. Marinov 22; Rebs: P. Marinov 7 Asts: S. Marinov, Bost 5	Boxscore	Pts: Liutych 19; Rebs: Paliashchuk 11; Asts: Kudrautsau 4	Arena: Arena Botevgrad; Attendance: 2,000; Referees: Petar Obradović (BIH), Erez Gurion (ISR), Zoran Mitrovski (MKD)

9 August 2017	Belarus	78–75	Portugal	Minsk
19:00	Scoring by quarter: 26–10, 10–23, 17–16, 25–26
	Pts: Parakhouski, Liutych 16; Rebs: Parakhouski 9 Asts: Vabishchevich 6	Boxscore	Pts: Barroso 18; Rebs: Hallman 6 Asts: Pinto 5	Arena: Minsk Sports Palace; Attendance: 2,000; Referees: Marius Ciulin (ROU), Gintaras Vitkauskas (LTU), Yener Yılmaz (TUR)

12 August 2017	Bulgaria	91–65	Portugal	Botevgrad
18:00	Scoring by quarter: 28–11, 26–18, 22–19, 15–17
	Pts: Vezenkov 21; Rebs: Yanev Georgiev 8 Asts: S. Marinov 7	Boxscore	Pts: Lima 16; Rebs: Lima 5 Asts: Oliveira 4	Arena: Arena Botevgrad; Attendance: 2,300; Referees: Panagiotis Anastopoulos (GRE), Ernad Karović (BIH), Ciprian Stoica (ROU)

16 August 2017	Belarus	70–84	Bulgaria	Minsk
19:30	Scoring by quarter: 15–21, 23–25, 22–19, 10–19
	Pts: Liutych 18; Rebs: Semianiuk 9 Asts: Kudrautsau 2	Boxscore	Pts: Kostov 21; Rebs: Vezenkov 7 Asts: Bost 6	Arena: Minsk Sports Palace; Attendance: 1,800; Referees: Srđan Dožai (CRO), Saša Maričić (SRB), Tanel Suslov (EST)

19 August 2017	Portugal	79–78(OT)	Belarus	Coimbra
18:30	Scoring by quarter: 23–22, 19–15, 10–14, 15–16, Overtime: 12–11
	Pts: Lima 16; Rebs: Lima 6 Asts: Oliveira 7	Boxscore	Pts: Liutych 18; Rebs: Parakhouski 17; Asts: Kudrautsau 5	Arena: Pavilhão Multidesportos Dr. Mário Mexia; Attendance: 900; Referees: Antonio Conde (ESP), Manuel Mazzoni (ITA), Yohan Rosso (FRA)

== Qualifiers ==
=== First round ===
The 24 national teams that qualified for EuroBasket 2017 automatically qualified for this stage. They were joined by eight teams qualified through the Pre-Qualifiers. In total, 32 teams were divided into eight home-and-away round robin groups of four teams. The allocation of teams from the first round was determined on 24 August 2017, with the only restriction of not drawing Serbia and Kosovo in the same group.

Games were played during November 2017, February 2018, June 2018, and July 2018. The top three teams from each group advanced to the Second round. The bottom team from each group was eliminated from the 2019 FIBA Basketball World Cup and transferred to the Second round of EuroBasket 2021.

==== Draw ====
There were two draws for the first round (group stage). The first one took place in Guangzhou on 6 May 2017 and involved only 24 teams directly qualified to this round as EuroBasket 2017 participants. The second draw was held in Munich on 24 August 2017, after Pre-Qualifiers was concluded and involved only 8 teams qualified from Pre-Qualifiers.

==== Seeding ====
Teams were seeded according to their performance at the latest FIBA Europe tournaments. They were divided into eight pots of four teams. Pots 1 to 6 involved all EuroBasket 2017 participants and were determined using the same seedings as Eurobasket 2017. Pot 7 was reserved for the Pre-Qualifiers group winners and pot 8 for the runners-up. Teams from pots 1, 4, 5, and 8 were drawn to Groups A, C, E, and G, while teams from pots 2, 3, 6, and 7 were drawn to Groups B, D, F, and H.

Pot 1 Team Spain Lithuania France Serbia	Pot 2 Team Greece Italy Czech Republic Latvia	Pot 3 Team Croatia Israel Turkey Finland	Pot 4 Team Russia Slovenia Hungary Georgia	Pot 5 Team Germany Belgium Poland Montenegro	Pot 6 Team Iceland Great Britain Ukraine Romania	Pot 7 Team Sweden Netherlands Estonia Bulgaria	Pot 8 Team Bosnia and Herzegovina Austria Kosovo Belarus

==== Group A ====
Pos	Team	Pld	W	L	PF	PA	PD	Pts	Qualification
1	Spain	6	6	0	497	431	+66	12	Advance to the second round
2	Montenegro	6	3	3	454	443	+11	9	Advance to the second round
3	Slovenia	6	2	4	484	492	−8	8	Advance to the second round
4	Belarus	6	1	5	445	514	−69	7	Relegated to the EuroBasket Pre-Qualifiers second round

Source: FIBA
Rules for classification: 1) Points; 2) Head-to-head results; 3) Points difference; 4) Points scored.

24 November 2017	Montenegro	66–79	Spain	Podgorica
20:00	Scoring by quarter: 15–15, 14–23, 12–20, 25–21
	Pts: Ivanović 10; Rebs: Ivanović, Radović 5 Asts: Ivanović 8	Boxscore	Pts: Colom, Vázquez 15; Rebs: Saiz 9 Asts: Colom 4	Arena: Morača Sports Center; Attendance: 3,600; Referees: Panagiotis Anastopoulos (GRE), Lorenzo Baldini (ITA), Marek Maliszewski (POL)

24 November 2017	Slovenia	87–74	Belarus	Ljubljana
20:30	Scoring by quarter: 22–12, 20–12, 25–27, 20–23
	Pts: Čančar 20; Rebs: Vidmar 9 Asts: Prepelič 8	Boxscore	Pts: Wayns 14; Rebs: Meshcharakou 9 Asts: Vabishchevich 6	Arena: Arena Stožice; Attendance: 7,000; Referees: Tolga Sahin (ITA), Anastasios Manos (GRE), Michał Proc (POL)

26 November 2017	Belarus	67–91	Montenegro	Minsk
19:30	Scoring by quarter: 16–24, 15–31, 18–14, 18–22
	Pts: Liutych 18; Rebs: Semianiuk 9 Asts: Wayns 3	Boxscore	Pts: Radović 19; Rebs: Sekulić 10; Asts: Vranješ 5	Arena: Minsk Sports Palace; Attendance: 2,000; Referees: Saverio Lanzarini (ITA), Oskars Lūsis (LAT), Vilius Mačiulaitis (LTU)

26 November 2017	Spain	92–84	Slovenia	Burgos
19:30	Scoring by quarter: 20–21, 24–17, 29–27, 19–19
	Pts: Colom 25; Rebs: three players 5 Asts: Colom 9	Boxscore	Pts: Prepelič 27; Rebs: Vidmar 7 Asts: Prepelič 6	Arena: Coliseum Burgos; Attendance: 7,500; Referees: Manuel Mazzoni (ITA), Tomas Jasevičius (LTU), Gentian Cici (ALB)

23 February 2018	Belarus	82–84	Spain	Minsk
19:30	Scoring by quarter: 15–25, 19–15, 25–23, 23–21
	Pts: Kudrautsau 18; Rebs: Beliankou 7 Asts: Saddler 7	Boxscore	Pts: Colom 17; Rebs: Vázquez 6 Asts: San Miguel 5	Arena: Minsk Sports Palace; Attendance: 3,052; Referees: Srđan Dožai (CRO), Marius Ciulin (ROU), Petar Obradović (BIH)

23 February 2018	Montenegro	63–75	Slovenia	Podgorica
20:00	Scoring by quarter: 13–16, 16–16, 22–23, 12–20
	Pts: Nikolić 15; Rebs: Šehović 5 Asts: Needham 7	Boxscore	Pts: Prepelič 19; Rebs: Vidmar 9 Asts: Prepelič 5	Arena: Morača Sports Center; Attendance: 2,800; Referees: Yohan Rosso (FRA), Janusz Calik (POL), Yener Yılmaz (TUR)

26 February 2018	Spain	79–67	Montenegro	Zaragoza
19:00	Scoring by quarter: 23–17, 23–22, 18–14, 15–14
	Pts: Aguilar 16; Rebs: Beirán, Saiz 6 Asts: Colom 9	Boxscore	Pts: Nikolić 13; Rebs: Nikolić 8 Asts: Ivanović 7	Arena: Pabellón Príncipe Felipe; Attendance: 8,573; Referees: Tolga Sahin (ITA), Martin Horozov (BUL), Wojciech Liszka (POL)

26 February 2018	Belarus	93–92	Slovenia	Minsk
19:30	Scoring by quarter: 26–24, 20–23, 29–27, 19–19
	Pts: Saddler 25; Rebs: Salash 10; Asts: Saddler 8	Boxscore	Pts: Blažič 27; Rebs: Rebec 7 Asts: Rebec 6	Arena: Minsk Sports Palace; Attendance: 2,500; Referees: Manuel Mazzoni (ITA), Georgios Poursanidis (GRE), Andris Aunkrogers (LAT)

28 June 2018	Slovenia	72–83	Spain	Ljubljana
20:00	Scoring by quarter: 20–26, 17–19, 13–15, 22–23
	Pts: Blažič 18; Rebs: Murić 7 Asts: Nikolić 6	Boxscore	Pts: Colom 16; Rebs: Saiz 11; Asts: Colom 5	Arena: Arena Stožice; Attendance: 6,700; Referees: Panagiotis Anastopoulos (GRE), Yohan Rosso (FRA), Gintaras Vitkauskas (LTU)

28 June 2018	Montenegro	80–69	Belarus	Nikšić
21:00	Scoring by quarter: 21–22, 12–10, 28–15, 19–22
	Pts: Bjelica 18; Rebs: Đurišić 6 Asts: Needham, Popović 3	Boxscore	Pts: Parakhouski 15; Rebs: Parakhouski 11; Asts: Saddler 6	Arena: Dvorana SC Nikšić; Attendance: 1,940; Referees: Saverio Lanzarini (ITA), Markos Michaelides (SUI), Michał Proc (POL)

1 July 2018	Spain	80–60	Belarus	Málaga
18:30	Scoring by quarter: 19–15, 19–13, 22–14, 20–18
	Pts: Hernangómez 11; Rebs: Hernangómez, Vázquez 8 Asts: Beirán 4	Boxscore	Pts: Saddler 18; Rebs: Salash 6 Asts: Saddler 6	Arena: Palacio de Deportes José María Martín Carpena; Attendance: 6,123; Referees: Petar Obradović (BIH), Janusz Calik (POL), Tomislav Vovk (CRO)

1 July 2018	Slovenia	74–87	Montenegro	Ljubljana
20:00	Scoring by quarter: 14–24, 25–22, 17–12, 18–29
	Pts: three players 15; Rebs: Čančar 8 Asts: Blažič, Prepelič 4	Boxscore	Pts: Đurišić 23; Rebs: Bjelica 11; Asts: Ivanović 6	Arena: Arena Stožice; Attendance: 5,000; Referees: Georgios Poursanidis (GRE), Tanel Suslov (EST), Lorenzo Baldini (ITA)

==== Group B ====
Pos	Team	Pld	W	L	PF	PA	PD	Pts	Qualification
1	Turkey	6	4	2	437	389	+48	10 (Note: Turkey 1–1, +3, Latvia 1–1, –3)	Advance to the second round
2	Latvia	6	4	2	477	453	+24	10	Advance to the second round
3	Ukraine	6	3	3	440	450	−10	9	Advance to the second round
4	Sweden	6	1	5	398	460	−62	7	Relegated to the EuroBasket Pre-Qualifiers second round

Source: FIBA
Rules for classification: 1) Points; 2) Head-to-head results; 3) Points difference; 4) Points scored.
Notes:

24 November 2017	Turkey	85–73	Latvia	Bursa
19:00	Scoring by quarter: 14–20, 23–14, 30–20, 18–19
	Pts: Mahmutoğlu 24; Rebs: Birsen 8 Asts: Ermiş 9	Boxscore	Pts: Peiners 25; Rebs: Peiners 6 Asts: Šķēle 7	Arena: Tofaş Nilüfer Spor Salonu; Attendance: 6,523; Referees: Srđan Dožai (CRO), Janusz Calik (POL), Aleksandar Glišić (SRB)

24 November 2017	Sweden	76–84	Ukraine	Norrköping
19:00	Scoring by quarter: 22–25, 12–28, 19–16, 23–15
	Pts: Czerapowicz 26; Rebs: V. Gaddefors 9 Asts: V. Gaddefors 5	Boxscore	Pts: Kravtsov 17; Rebs: six players 4 Asts: Gladyr, Lukashov 4	Arena: Stadium Arena; Attendance: 2,638; Referees: Tomas Jasevičius (LTU), Petr Hrůša (CZE), Dariusz Zapolski (POL)

26 November 2017	Latvia	82–73	Sweden	Riga
17:00	Scoring by quarter: 24–25, 18–16, 22–22, 18–10
	Pts: Peiners 18; Rebs: Pasečņiks, Šmits 6 Asts: Peiners 8	Boxscore	Pts: Borg, Czerapowicz 14; Rebs: Spires 6 Asts: Czerapowicz, Håkanson 4	Arena: Arena Riga; Attendance: 6,500; Referees: Nicolas Maestre (FRA), Alexey Davydov (RUS), Tanel Suslov (EST)

26 November 2017	Ukraine	60–67	Turkey	Kyiv
18:00	Scoring by quarter: 12–16, 16–11, 15–15, 17–25
	Pts: Gladyr 20; Rebs: Gladyr 7 Asts: Lukashov 5	Boxscore	Pts: Geçim 15; Rebs: Birsen 6 Asts: Ermiş 8	Arena: Palace of Sports; Attendance: 6,300; Referees: Antonio Conde (ESP), Erez Gurion (ISR), Lorenzo Baldini (ITA)

23 February 2018	Sweden	59–58	Turkey	Stockholm
19:00	Scoring by quarter: 15–13, 14–16, 21–10, 9–19
	Pts: Spires 16; Rebs: Gaddefors 12; Asts: Massamba 4	Boxscore	Pts: Mahmutoğlu 12; Rebs: Dixon 6 Asts: Dixon 6	Arena: Hovet; Attendance: 8,000; Referees: Vicente Bultó (ESP), Oskars Lūsis (LAT), Ciprian Stoica (ROU)

23 February 2018	Latvia	68–82	Ukraine	Riga
19:30	Scoring by quarter: 13–24, 17–16, 22–19, 16–23
	Pts: Blūms 24; Rebs: Meiers, Peiners 6 Asts: Blūms 7	Boxscore	Pts: Kravtsov 22; Rebs: Kravtsov 13; Asts: Koniev 6	Arena: Arena Riga; Attendance: 6,500; Referees: Marek Maliszewski (POL), Saša Maričić (SRB), Anastasios Manos (GRE)

26 February 2018	Ukraine	77–66	Sweden	Kyiv
19:00	Scoring by quarter: 26–25, 25–7, 9–12, 17–22
	Pts: Zaytsev 13; Rebs: Kravtsov 7 Asts: Jeter 6	Boxscore	Pts: Massamba 13; Rebs: Birgander 5 Asts: Borg 3	Arena: Palace of Sports; Attendance: 6,500; Referees: Ademir Zurapović (BIH), Jasmina Juras (SRB), Zdenko Tomašovič (SVK)

26 February 2018	Latvia	79–70	Turkey	Riga
19:30	Scoring by quarter: 14–21, 18–15, 25–18, 22–16
	Pts: Meiers, Šmits 13; Rebs: Meiers 7 Asts: Blūms 6	Boxscore	Pts: Dixon 23; Rebs: Aldemir 13; Asts: three players 3	Arena: Arena Riga; Attendance: 6,000; Referees: Marius Ciulin (ROU), Fernando Calatrava (ESP), Michał Proc (POL)

28 June 2018	Sweden	72–82	Latvia	Stockholm
18:30	Scoring by quarter: 16–16, 26–31, 8–13, 22–22
	Pts: Håkanson 15; Rebs: Czerapowicz 11; Asts: Håkanson 6	Boxscore	Pts: Strēlnieks 27; Rebs: Siliņš 5 Asts: Peiners 4	Arena: Hovet; Attendance: 4,120; Referees: Petar Obradović (BIH), Alexey Davydov (RUS), Saša Maričić (SRB)

28 June 2018	Turkey	80–66	Ukraine	Ankara
20:00	Scoring by quarter: 15–28, 36–12, 10–11, 19–15
	Pts: Korkmaz 21; Rebs: four players 5 Asts: Erden, Wilbekin 4	Boxscore	Pts: Gladyr 17; Rebs: Kravtsov 5 Asts: Jeter 4	Arena: Ankara Arena; Attendance: 8,070; Referees: Aleksandar Glišić (SRB), Aleksandar Milojević (MKD), Tomislav Vovk (CRO)

1 July 2018	Ukraine	71–93	Latvia	Kyiv
16:00	Scoring by quarter: 12–16, 22–25, 18–32, 19–20
	Pts: Kravtsov 15; Rebs: Kravtsov 8 Asts: Lukashov 6	Boxscore	Pts: Strēlnieks 26; Rebs: Meiers 7 Asts: Strēlnieks 9	Arena: Palace of Sports; Attendance: 5,200; Referees: Gintaras Vitkauskas (LTU), Haris Bijedić (BIH), Sebastien Clivaz (SUI)

1 July 2018	Turkey	77–52	Sweden	Ankara
18:00	Scoring by quarter: 17–15, 22–10, 25–16, 13–11
	Pts: Korkmaz 23; Rebs: Osman 11; Asts: Balbay 5	Boxscore	Pts: Czerapowicz 21; Rebs: Birgander 8 Asts: Massamba 4	Arena: Ankara Arena; Referees: Saverio Lanzarini (ITA), Nicolas Maestre (FRA), Ivor Matejek (CZE)

==== Group C ====
Pos	Team	Pld	W	L	PF	PA	PD	Pts	Qualification
1	Lithuania	6	6	0	512	352	+160	12	Advance to the second round
2	Poland	6	3	3	436	410	+26	9 (Note: Poland 1–1, +3; Hungary 1–1, –3)	Advance to the second round
3	Hungary	6	3	3	414	421	−7	9	Advance to the second round
4	Kosovo	6	0	6	384	563	−179	6	Relegated to the EuroBasket Pre-Qualifiers second round

Source: FIBA
Rules for classification: 1) Points; 2) Head-to-head results; 3) Points difference; 4) Points scored.
Notes:

24 November 2017	Poland	70–60	Hungary	Bydgoszcz
18:15	Scoring by quarter: 14–16, 8–13, 17–11, 31–20
	Pts: Ponitka 17; Rebs: Ponitka 7 Asts: Łączyński 6	Boxscore	Pts: Perl 18; Rebs: Vojvoda 7 Asts: Ruják, Vojvoda 3	Arena: Łuczniczka; Attendance: 4,650; Referees: Apostolos Kalpakas (SWE), Marek Kúkelčík (SVK), Mārtiņš Kozlovskis (LAT)

24 November 2017	Kosovo	61–99	Lithuania	Pristina
19:00	Scoring by quarter: 21–20, 14–15, 12–25, 14–39
	Pts: Berisha 19; Rebs: three players 4 Asts: Berisha 5	Boxscore	Pts: Juškevičius 16; Rebs: Gailius 8 Asts: Girdžiūnas 7	Arena: Palace of Youth and Sports; Attendance: 2,200; Referees: Luis Castillo (ESP), Ventsislav Velikov (BUL), Boris Krejič (SLO)

26 November 2017	Lithuania	75–55	Poland	Klaipėda
19:30	Scoring by quarter: 13–17, 25–8, 18–14, 19–16
	Pts: Bendžius 18; Rebs: three players 7 Asts: Girdžiūnas, Juškevičius 3	Boxscore	Pts: Koszarek 12; Rebs: Wojciechowski 7 Asts: Koszarek, Łączyński 3	Arena: Švyturio Arena; Attendance: 5,200; Referees: Andris Aunkrogers (LAT), Arnis Ozols (LAT), Martin Horozov (BUL)

26 November 2017	Hungary	84–76	Kosovo	Debrecen
19:00	Scoring by quarter: 20–21, 15–15, 24–15, 25–25
	Pts: Vojvoda, Wittmann 20; Rebs: Allen 10; Asts: Wittmann 6	Boxscore	Pts: Berisha 22; Rebs: Shoshi 11; Asts: Bamforth, Berisha 4	Arena: Főnix Hall; Attendance: 5,500; Referees: Ademir Zurapović (BIH), Anastasios Pilosdis (GRE), Andrei Sharapa (BLR)

23 February 2018	Poland	90–62	Kosovo	Włocławek
19:00	Scoring by quarter: 20–12, 28–14, 26–19, 16–17
	Pts: Gruszecki 18; Rebs: Cel, Ponitka 7 Asts: Koszarek 5	Boxscore	Pts: Berisha 23; Rebs: Jones 9 Asts: Berisha 4	Arena: Hala Mistrzów; Attendance: 3,421; Referees: Zafer Yılmaz (TUR), Ivor Matejek (CZE), Özlem Yalman (TUR)

23 February 2018	Lithuania	80–75	Hungary	Klaipėda
19:45	Scoring by quarter: 19–19, 22–18, 16–16, 23–22
	Pts: Grigonis 13; Rebs: Kairys 7 Asts: Janavičius 5	Boxscore	Pts: Allen 17; Rebs: Perl 7 Asts: Ruják 5	Arena: Švyturio Arena; Attendance: 4,500; Referees: Sergiy Zashchuk (UKR), Zdravko Rutešić (MNE), Pavel Fuška (SVK)

26 February 2018	Lithuania	106–50	Kosovo	Klaipėda
19:30	Scoring by quarter: 28–19, 20–8, 26–12, 32–11
	Pts: Bendžius 22; Rebs: Echodas 8 Asts: Girdžiūnas 9	Boxscore	Pts: Jones 23; Rebs: Jones 6 Asts: Mekaj 4	Arena: Švyturio Arena; Attendance: 2,500; Referees: Apostolos Kalpakas (SWE), Paulo Marques (POR), Marek Kúkelčík (SVK)

26 February 2018	Hungary	64–57	Poland	Szombathely
20:00	Scoring by quarter: 12–14, 20–18, 24–12, 8–13
	Pts: Perl 16; Rebs: Allen 5 Asts: Govens, Perl 3	Boxscore	Pts: Ponitka 20; Rebs: Ponitka 7 Asts: Karnowski, Koszarek 3	Arena: Arena Savaria; Attendance: 3,200; Referees: Aleksandar Glišić (SRB), Alexey Davydov (RUS), Tomislav Vovk (CRO)

28 June 2018	Poland	61–79	Lithuania	Gdańsk
19:00	Scoring by quarter: 17–14, 8–22, 22–17, 14–26
	Pts: Mat. Ponitka 16; Rebs: Mat. Ponitka, Waczyński 5 Asts: Koszarek, Mat. Ponitka 4	Boxscore	Pts: Sabonis 17; Rebs: Sabonis, Valančiūnas 7 Asts: Kalnietis 9	Arena: Ergo Arena; Attendance: 4,543; Referees: Ademir Zurapović (BIH), Arnis Ozols (LAT), Borys Shulga (UKR)

28 June 2018	Kosovo	65–81	Hungary	Pristina
20:30	Scoring by quarter: 19–29, 20–10, 13–18, 13–24
	Pts: Berisha 17; Rebs: Grosha 6 Asts: Berisha 9	Boxscore	Pts: Vojvoda 17; Rebs: Eilingsfeld 8 Asts: Vojvoda 6	Arena: Palace of Youth and Sports; Attendance: 1,200; Referees: Nicolas Maestre (FRA), Sergiy Zashchuk (UKR), Petr Hrůša (CZE)

1 July 2018	Hungary	50–73	Lithuania	Budapest
20:00	Scoring by quarter: 14–19, 10–18, 13–18, 13–18
	Pts: Keller 12; Rebs: Allen 7 Asts: Ruják 4	Boxscore	Pts: Valančiūnas 15; Rebs: Gudaitis 13; Asts: Kalnietis 5	Arena: Tüskecsarnok; Attendance: 2,800; Referees: Vicente Bulto (ESP), Yohan Rosso (FRA), Markos Michaelides (SUI)

1 July 2018	Kosovo	70–103	Poland	Pristina
20:30	Scoring by quarter: 23–30, 11–27, 25–23, 11–23
	Pts: Kastrati 21; Rebs: Kapiti 7 Asts: Berisha 6	Boxscore	Pts: Gruszecki 21; Rebs: Lampe 10; Asts: Koszarek 11	Arena: Palace of Youth and Sports; Attendance: 250; Referees: Zafer Yılmaz (TUR), Erez Gurion (ISR), Radomir Vojinović (MNE)

==== Group D ====
Pos	Team	Pld	W	L	PF	PA	PD	Pts	Qualification
1	Italy	6	4	2	474	405	+69	10	Advance to the second round
2	Netherlands	6	3	3	434	416	+18	9 (Note: Netherlands 1–1, +3; Croatia 1–1, –3)	Advance to the second round
3	Croatia	6	3	3	431	419	+12	9	Advance to the second round
4	Romania	6	2	4	368	467	−99	8	Relegated to the EuroBasket Pre-Qualifiers second round

Source: FIBA
Rules for classification: 1) Points; 2) Head-to-head results; 3) Points difference; 4) Points scored.
Notes:

24 November 2017	Netherlands	68–61	Croatia	Almere
20:00	Scoring by quarter: 18–13, 15–18, 17–17, 18–13
	Pts: Franke 24; Rebs: De Jong 6 Asts: Norel 3	Boxscore	Pts: Šakić 24; Rebs: Ramljak 8 Asts: Katić 4	Arena: Topsportcentrum; Attendance: 3,008; Referees: Antonio Conde (ESP), Andris Aunkrogers (LAT), Markos Michaelides (SUI)

24 November 2017	Italy	75–70	Romania	Turin
20:15	Scoring by quarter: 26–15, 16–13, 17–15, 26–27
	Pts: Aradori, Della Valle 16; Rebs: Biligha, Gentile 6 Asts: Filloy 4	Boxscore	Pts: Cățe 16; Rebs: Cățe 8 Asts: Watson 5	Arena: PalaRuffini; Attendance: 4,500; Referees: Nicolas Maestre (FRA), Haris Bijedić (BIH), Uroš Nikolić (SRB)

26 November 2017	Croatia	64–80	Italy	Zagreb
18:00	Scoring by quarter: 23–15, 9–20, 15–25, 17–20
	Pts: Planinić 20; Rebs: Planinić 10; Asts: Mavra 4	Boxscore	Pts: Della Valle 25; Rebs: Awudu, Gentile 5 Asts: Filloy 4	Arena: Dražen Petrović Basketball Hall; Attendance: 5,000; Referees: Vicente Bultó (ESP), Panagiotis Anastopoulos (GRE), Yener Yılmaz (TUR)

26 November 2017	Romania	75–68	Netherlands	Cluj-Napoca
19:00	Scoring by quarter: 16–15, 18–12, 20–19, 21–22
	Pts: Torok 13; Rebs: Cățe 8 Asts: Watson 6	Boxscore	Pts: Franke 14; Rebs: Norel 7 Asts: three players 2	Arena: Polyvalent Hall; Attendance: 5,363; Referees: Zafer Yılmaz (TUR), Aleksandar Milojević (MKD), Jasmina Juras (SRB)

23 February 2018	Croatia	56–58	Romania	Zadar
18:00	Scoring by quarter: 16–16, 12–5, 10–16, 18–21
	Pts: Perić 19; Rebs: Perić 12; Asts: Krušlin 3	Boxscore	Pts: Kuti 16; Rebs: Cățe 14; Asts: Mandache 5	Arena: Krešimir Ćosić Hall; Attendance: 5,500; Referees: Georgios Poursanidis (GRE), Gintaras Vitkauskas (LTU), Alexey Davydov (RUS)

23 February 2018	Italy	80–62	Netherlands	Treviso
20:15	Scoring by quarter: 26–13, 19–21, 18–14, 17–14
	Pts: Della Valle 22; Rebs: Burns 7 Asts: Filloy 6	Boxscore	Pts: Schaftenaar 17; Rebs: Kloof 9 Asts: De Jong 4	Arena: Palaverde; Attendance: 5,500; Referees: Tanel Suslov (EST), Luis Castillo (ESP), Sébastien Clivaz (SUI)

26 February 2018	Romania	50–101	Italy	Cluj-Napoca
19:00	Scoring by quarter: 12–35, 13–12, 11–29, 14–25
	Pts: Cățe 15; Rebs: Cățe 9 Asts: Kuti, Mandache 4	Boxscore	Pts: Della Valle 29; Rebs: Burns 8 Asts: Filloy 6	Arena: Polyvalent Hall; Attendance: 5,370; Referees: Antonio Conde (ESP), Sergiy Chebyshev (UKR), Marko Vladić (AUT)

26 February 2018	Croatia	82–78	Netherlands	Zadar
20:00	Scoring by quarter: 25–13, 19–21, 15–26, 23–18
	Pts: Šakić 22; Rebs: Krušlin 7 Asts: Krušlin 6	Boxscore	Pts: Van der Mars 20; Rebs: Hammink 7 Asts: Kloof 6	Arena: Krešimir Ćosić Hall; Attendance: 4,500; Referees: Marek Cmikiewicz (POL), Gentian Cici (ALB), Mārtiņš Kozlovskis (LAT)

28 June 2018	Netherlands	77–52	Romania	Groningen
20:00	Scoring by quarter: 22–12, 11–12, 23–15, 21–13
	Pts: Franke 18; Rebs: De Jong 7 Asts: Kloof 6	Boxscore	Pts: Cățe 16; Rebs: Cățe 10; Asts: Watson 4	Arena: MartiniPlaza; Attendance: 1,844; Referees: Oskars Lūsis (LAT), Haris Bijedić (BIH), Erez Gurion (ISR)

28 June 2018	Italy	72–78	Croatia	Trieste
20:45	Scoring by quarter: 24–21, 15–19, 13–25, 20–13
	Pts: Aradori 15; Rebs: Burns 6 Asts: Burns, Vitali 3	Boxscore	Pts: Bogdanović 26; Rebs: Šarić 9 Asts: Bogdanović 6	Arena: PalaTrieste; Attendance: 5,500; Referees: Vicente Bultó (ESP), Georgios Poursanidis (GRE), Tanel Suslov (EST)

1 July 2018	Netherlands	81–66	Italy	Groningen
18:00	Scoring by quarter: 19–14, 19–16, 20–19, 23–17
	Pts: Kloof 21; Rebs: Hammink 8 Asts: Kloof 3	Boxscore	Pts: Abass 18; Rebs: Abass, Sacchetti 5 Asts: Burns 2	Arena: MartiniPlaza; Referees: Sergiy Zashchuk (UKR), Zdravko Rutešić (MNE), Arnis Ozols (LAT)

1 July 2018	Romania	63–90	Croatia	Cluj-Napoca
19:00	Scoring by quarter: 18–19, 13–25, 16–25, 16–21
	Pts: Watson 20; Rebs: Cățe 12; Asts: Watson 8	Boxscore	Pts: Šarić 22; Rebs: Šarić 12; Asts: Bogdanović, Šarić 5	Arena: Polyvalent Hall; Attendance: 1,575; Referees: Panagiotis Anastopoulos (GRE), Yener Yılmaz (TUR), Anastasios Piloidis (GRE)

==== Group E ====
Pos	Team	Pld	W	L	PF	PA	PD	Pts	Qualification
1	France	6	6	0	479	377	+102	12	Advance to the second round
2	Russia	6	3	3	458	428	+30	9	Advance to the second round
3	Bosnia and Herzegovina	6	2	4	400	481	−81	8	Advance to the second round
4	Belgium	6	1	5	392	443	−51	7	Relegated to the EuroBasket Pre-Qualifiers second round

Source: FIBA
Rules for classification: 1) Points; 2) Head-to-head results; 3) Points difference; 4) Points scored.

24 November 2017	Bosnia and Herzegovina	81–76	Russia	Sarajevo
18:45	Scoring by quarter: 20–21, 18–17, 22–18, 21–20
	Pts: Musa 18; Rebs: Atić, Musa 7 Asts: Gegić 4	Boxscore	Pts: Fridzon 25; Rebs: Antonov 7 Asts: Kulagin 6	Arena: Mirza Delibašić Hall; Attendance: 4,500; Referees: Saverio Lanzarini (ITA), Gentian Cici (ALB), Ciprian Stoica (ROU)

24 November 2017	Belgium	59–70	France	Antwerp
20:30	Scoring by quarter: 15–13, 23–12, 8–23, 13–22
	Pts: Obasohan 16; Rebs: Vanwijn 7 Asts: Obasohan, Vanwijn 3	Boxscore	Pts: Jackson 14; Rebs: Fall 6 Asts: Lacombe 4	Arena: Lotto Arena; Attendance: 3,124; Referees: Vicente Bultó (ESP), Radomir Vojinović (MNE), Tanel Suslov (EST)

27 November 2017	Russia	76–69	Belgium	Nizhny Novgorod
17:00	Scoring by quarter: 16–23, 20–13, 26–13, 14–22
	Pts: Karasev 14; Rebs: Karasev 6 Asts: Kulagin 9	Boxscore	Pts: Salumu 17; Rebs: Vanwijn 8 Asts: Gillet, Obasohan 3	Arena: Trade Union Sport Palace; Attendance: 3,236; Referees: Apostolos Kalpakas (SWE), Saša Maričić (SRB), Zdravko Rutešić (MNE)

27 November 2017	France	84–65	Bosnia and Herzegovina	Rouen
20:45	Scoring by quarter: 19–12, 20–22, 22–15, 23–16
	Pts: Labeyrie 13; Rebs: Jackson 8 Asts: Diaw 6	Boxscore	Pts: Gordić 16; Rebs: Kikanović 5 Asts: three players 3	Arena: Kindarena; Attendance: 5,069; Referees: Georgios Poursanidis (GRE), Wojciech Liszka (POL), Fernando Calatrava (ESP)

23 February 2018	Bosnia and Herzegovina	72–70	Belgium	Sarajevo
20:00	Scoring by quarter: 17–17, 17–11, 11–23, 27–19
	Pts: Gordić 17; Rebs: Halilović 8 Asts: Gordić 5	Boxscore	Pts: Serron 19; Rebs: Tumba, Vanwijn 9 Asts: Tabu 6	Arena: Mirza Delibašić Hall; Attendance: 6,000; Referees: Panagiotis Anastopoulos (GRE), Andris Aunkrogers (LAT), Martin Horozov (BUL)

23 February 2018	France	75–74(OT)	Russia	Strasbourg
20:45	Scoring by quarter: 12–12, 16–17, 15–12, 18–20, Overtime: 14–13
	Pts: Diaw 23; Rebs: Kahudi 8 Asts: Albicy 9	Boxscore	Pts: Kulagin 17; Rebs: Zubkov 8 Asts: Kulagin 4	Arena: Rhénus Sport; Attendance: 5,823; Referees: Antonio Conde (ESP), Tolga Sahin (ITA), Boris Krejič (SLO)

25 February 2018	France	64–49	Belgium	Nancy
15:00	Scoring by quarter: 15–14, 15–18, 15–7, 19–10
	Pts: Fall 23; Rebs: Invernizzi 8 Asts: Lacombe 5	Boxscore	Pts: Gillet 12; Rebs: Serron 8 Asts: Obasohan, Salumu 4	Arena: Palais des Sports Jean Weille; Attendance: 5,702; Referees: Srđan Dožai (CRO), Markos Michaelides (SUI), Yener Yılmaz (TUR)

25 February 2018	Russia	70–53	Bosnia and Herzegovina	Perm
19:00	Scoring by quarter: 15–16, 21–16, 21–6, 13–15
	Pts: Fridzon 16; Rebs: Fridzon 8 Asts: Khvostov 7	Boxscore	Pts: Musa 26; Rebs: Stipanović 8 Asts: Stipanović 3	Arena: Universal Sports Palace Molot; Attendance: 7,457; Referees: Vicente Bultó (ESP), Tomas Jasevičius (LTU), Anastasios Piloidis (GRE)

29 June 2018	Belgium	66–84	Russia	Antwerp
20:30	Scoring by quarter: 23–20, 24–25, 14–22, 5–17
	Pts: Boukichou, Van Rossom 15; Rebs: Gillet 8 Asts: Van Rossom 6	Boxscore	Pts: Khvostov, Mozgov 14; Rebs: Kurbanov, Mozgov 6 Asts: Kurbanov 4	Arena: Lotto Arena; Attendance: 2,560; Referees: Tolga Sahin (ITA), Anastasios Manos (GRE), Dariusz Zapolski (POL)

29 June 2018	Bosnia and Herzegovina	52–102	France	Tuzla
20:30	Scoring by quarter: 12–23, 10–21, 14–29, 16–29
	Pts: Vrabac 10; Rebs: Vrabac 4 Asts: Hasandić 5	Boxscore	Pts: Gobert, Poirier 16; Rebs: Gobert, Poirier 6 Asts: Batum 8	Arena: Dvorana Mejdan; Referees: Manuel Mazzoni (ITA), Sergiy Zashchuk (UKR), Fernando Calatrava (ESP)

2 July 2018	Russia	78–84	France	Krasnodar
19:00	Scoring by quarter: 22–22, 20–22, 17–22, 19–18
	Pts: Khvostov 24; Rebs: Fridzon, Zubkov 8 Asts: Khvostov 6	Boxscore	Pts: De Colo, Fournier 15; Rebs: Fall 5 Asts: Heurtel 5	Arena: Basket-Hall Krasnodar; Attendance: 7,200; Referees: Aleksandar Glišić (SRB), Antonio Conde (ESP), Sasa Maričić (SRB)

2 July 2018	Belgium	79–77	Bosnia and Herzegovina	Antwerp
20:30	Scoring by quarter: 19–18, 14–9, 29–28, 17–22
	Pts: Kesteloot, Van Rossom 20; Rebs: Boukichou 10; Asts: Tabu 4	Boxscore	Pts: Kikanović 24; Rebs: Kikanović 6 Asts: Atić, Gegić 4	Arena: Lotto Arena; Referees: Michał Proc (POL), Borys Shulga (UKR), Gentian Cici (ALB)

==== Group F ====
Pos	Team	Pld	W	L	PF	PA	PD	Pts	Qualification
1	Czech Republic	6	5	1	464	425	+39	11	Advance to the second round
2	Finland	6	3	3	453	449	+4	9	Advance to the second round
3	Bulgaria	6	2	4	466	476	−10	8 (Note: Bulgaria 2–0; Iceland 0–2)	Advance to the second round
4	Iceland	6	2	4	463	496	−33	8	Relegated to the EuroBasket Pre-Qualifiers second round

Source: FIBA
Rules for classification: 1) Points; 2) Head-to-head results; 3) Points difference; 4) Points scored.
Notes:

24 November 2017	Czech Republic	89–69	Iceland	Pardubice
18:00	Scoring by quarter: 15–11, 24–19, 21–21, 29–18
	Pts: Bohačík 20; Rebs: Kríz, Schilb 6 Asts: Hruban 8	Boxscore	Pts: Hermannsson 29; Rebs: Acox 8 Asts: Bæringsson 5	Arena: Tipsport arena Attendance: 2,913; Referees: Sasa Maričić (SRB), Fernando Calatrava (ESP), Sergiy Zashchuk (UKR)

24 November 2017	Bulgaria	80–82	Finland	Botevgrad
19:00	Scoring by quarter: 19–17, 17–22, 17–21, 27–22
	Pts: S. Marinov 18; Rebs: Vezenkov 7 Asts: three players 3	Boxscore	Pts: Wilson 20; Rebs: Murphy 6 Asts: Wilson 7	Arena: Arena Botevgrad; Attendance: 3,000; Referees: Georgios Poursanidis (GRE), Zafer Yılmaz (TUR), Wojciech Liszka (POL)

27 November 2017	Finland	56–64	Czech Republic	Helsinki
18:30	Scoring by quarter: 9–19, 21–6, 8–13, 18–26
	Pts: Huff 13; Rebs: Murphy 6 Asts: Wilson 5	Boxscore	Pts: Schilb 17; Rebs: Balvín 16; Asts: Balvín 7	Arena: Helsinki Ice Hall; Attendance: 5,065; Referees: Aleksandar Glišić (SRB), Gintaras Vitkauskas (LTU), Dariusz Zapolski (POL)

27 November 2017	Iceland	74–77	Bulgaria	Reykjavík
19:45	Scoring by quarter: 21–17, 22–18, 18–18, 13–24
	Pts: Hermannsson 21; Rebs: Bæringsson 11; Asts: Hermannsson 6	Boxscore	Pts: P. Marinov 18; Rebs: Vezenkov 7 Asts: S. Marinov 5	Arena: Laugardalshöll; Attendance: 1,200; Referees: Luis Castillo (ESP), Mārtiņš Kozlovskis (LAT), Tomislav Vovk (CRO)

23 February 2018	Bulgaria	76–78	Czech Republic	Botevgrad
18:00	Scoring by quarter: 17–20, 31–17, 8–17, 20–24
	Pts: P. Marinov 15; Rebs: P. Marinov, Yanev 5 Asts: Bost 8	Boxscore	Pts: Bohačík 24; Rebs: Balvín 10; Asts: Kriz 3	Arena: Arena Botevgrad; Attendance: 2,000; Referees: Ademir Zurapović (BIH), Radomir Vojinović (MNE), Erez Gurion (ISR)

23 February 2018	Iceland	81–76	Finland	Reykjavík
19:45	Scoring by quarter: 19–18, 20–20, 16–21, 26–17
	Pts: Hermannsson 26; Rebs: Bæringsson 12; Asts: Hermannsson 6	Boxscore	Pts: Wilson 17; Rebs: Kotti 7 Asts: Wilson 9	Arena: Laugardalshöll; Attendance: 1,800; Referees: Saverio Lanzarini (ITA), Apostolos Kalpakas (SWE), Haris Bidejić (BIH)

25 February 2018	Iceland	76–75	Czech Republic	Reykjavík
16:00	Scoring by quarter: 19–14, 20–18, 20–22, 17–21
	Pts: Hermannsson 26; Rebs: Hlinason 8 Asts: Pálsson 5	Boxscore	Pts: Auda 23; Rebs: Bohačík 8 Asts: Bohačík 5	Arena: Laugardalshöll; Attendance: 2,000; Referees: Janusz Calik (POL), Marek Maliszewski (POL), Goran Šljivić (AUT)

25 February 2018	Finland	75–70	Bulgaria	Helsinki
18:30	Scoring by quarter: 12–16, 28–14, 18–30, 17–10
	Pts: Wilson 21; Rebs: Nenonen 8 Asts: Wilson 11	Boxscore	Pts: Vezenkov 28; Rebs: Vezenkov 10; Asts: Bost 10	Arena: Helsinki Ice Hall; Attendance: 5,300; Referees: Lorenzo Baldini (ITA), Ernad Karović (BIH), Andrei Sharapa (BLR)

29 June 2018	Czech Republic	77–73	Finland	Pardubice
18:00	Scoring by quarter: 18–17, 19–19, 24–19, 16–18
	Pts: Hruban 30; Rebs: three players 5 Asts: Kříž 4	Boxscore	Pts: Nuutinen 24; Rebs: Markkanen 7 Asts: Wilson 6	Arena: Tipsport arena Attendance: 3,216; Referees: Srđan Dožai (CRO), Jasmina Juras (SRB), Zdravko Rutešić (MNE)

29 June 2018	Bulgaria	88–86	Iceland	Botevgrad
18:00	Scoring by quarter: 22–21, 23–22, 20–25, 23–18
	Pts: Vezenkov 19; Rebs: Zahariev 9 Asts: S. Marinov 5	Boxscore	Pts: Bæringsson 16; Rebs: Bæringsson 7 Asts: Vilhjálmsson 8	Arena: Arena Botevgrad; Attendance: 2,200; Referees: Andris Aunkrogers (LAT), Yener Yılmaz (TUR), Anastasios Piloidis (GRE)

2 July 2018	Czech Republic	81–75	Bulgaria	Pardubice
18:00	Scoring by quarter: 19–20, 22–15, 18–15, 22–25
	Pts: Schilb 20; Rebs: Balvín, Vyoral 7 Asts: Šiřina 6	Boxscore	Pts: Avramov 15; Rebs: Vezenkov 10; Asts: S. Marinov 8	Arena: Tipsport arena Referees: Oskars Lūsis (LAT), Sergiy Chebyshev (UKR), Marko Vladić (AUT)

2 July 2018	Finland	91–77	Iceland	Helsinki
18:45	Scoring by quarter: 28–19, 16–22, 23–17, 24–19
	Pts: Markkanen 28; Rebs: Lindbom, Markkanen 7 Asts: Wilson 11	Boxscore	Pts: Pálsson 16; Rebs: Guðmundsson, Pálsson 5 Asts: Hermannsson 5	Arena: Helsinki Ice Hall; Attendance: 12,183; Referees: Tolga Sahin (ITA), Tomas Jasevičius (LTU), Dariusz Zapolski (POL)

==== Group G ====
Pos	Team	Pld	W	L	PF	PA	PD	Pts	Qualification
1	Germany	6	6	0	508	414	+94	12	Advance to the second round
2	Serbia	6	4	2	514	449	+65	10	Advance to the second round
3	Georgia	6	2	4	460	495	−35	8	Advance to the second round
4	Austria	6	0	6	394	518	−124	6	Relegated to the EuroBasket Pre-Qualifiers second round

Source: FIBA
Rules for classification: 1) Points; 2) Head-to-head results; 3) Points difference; 4) Points scored.

24 November 2017	Germany	79–70	Georgia	Chemnitz
19:30	Scoring by quarter: 18–18, 22–23, 20–20, 19–9
	Pts: Benzing 25; Rebs: Hartenstein 10; Asts: Tadda 4	Boxscore	Pts: Dixon 23; Rebs: Tskitishvili 5 Asts: Dixon, Markoishvili 5	Arena: Chemnitz Arena; Attendance: 5,037; Referees: Yohan Rosso (FRA), Zdravko Rutešić (MNE), Martin Horozov (BUL)

24 November 2017	Serbia	85–64	Austria	Belgrade
20:00	Scoring by quarter: 17–12, 27–17, 15–13, 26–22
	Pts: Paunić 16; Rebs: Raduljica 8 Asts: Đoković, Peno 4	Boxscore	Pts: Mahalbašić 15; Rebs: Radoš 5 Asts: Schreiner 8	Arena: Aleksandar Nikolić Hall; Attendance: 4,278; Referees: Oskars Lūsis (LAT), Özlem Yalman (TUR), Sergei Beliakov (RUS)

27 November 2017	Serbia	105–87	Georgia	Belgrade
20:00	Scoring by quarter: 21–21, 23–24, 30–19, 31–23
	Pts: Raduljica 28; Rebs: Raduljica 8 Asts: Peno 9	Boxscore	Pts: Dixon 36; Rebs: Markoishvili 7 Asts: Dixon 9	Arena: Aleksandar Nikolić Hall; Attendance: 5,890; Referees: Tolga Sahin (ITA), Marius Ciulin (ROU), Anastasios Manos (GRE)

27 November 2017	Austria	49–90	Germany	Schwechat
20:20	Scoring by quarter: 8–20, 13–21, 12–23, 16–26
	Pts: Ogunsipe, Schreiner 11; Rebs: Mahalbašić 7 Asts: Schreiner 5	Boxscore	Pts: Thiemann 17; Rebs: Thiemann 10; Asts: Doreth 5	Arena: Multiversum; Attendance: 1,400; Referees: Ventsislav Velikov (BUL), Boris Krejić (SLO), Sergiy Zashchuk (UKR)

23 February 2018	Austria	64–78	Georgia	Schwechat
18:00	Scoring by quarter: 5–19, 26–21, 18–15, 15–23
	Pts: Klepeisz 23; Rebs: Douvier 10; Asts: Schreiner 9	Boxscore	Pts: Dixon 23; Rebs: Dixon 9 Asts: Dixon 4	Arena: Multiversum; Attendance: 1,100; Referees: Lorenzo Baldini (ITA), Anastasios Piloidis (GRE), Ilias Kounelles (CYP)

23 February 2018	Germany	79–74	Serbia	Frankfurt
19:30	Scoring by quarter: 20–26, 20–15, 17–18, 22–15
	Pts: Benzing 17; Rebs: Akpınar 5 Asts: Doreth 4	Boxscore	Pts: Raduljica 22; Rebs: Lešić 7 Asts: Paunić 4	Arena: Fraport Arena; Attendance: 5,002; Referees: Manuel Mazzoni (ITA), Fernando Calatrava (ESP), Gentian Cici (ALB)

25 February 2018	Georgia	77–87	Germany	Tbilisi
19:00	Scoring by quarter: 17–27, 21–24, 24–18, 15–18
	Pts: Dixon 26; Rebs: Bitadze 5 Asts: Dixon, Patsatsia 4	Boxscore	Pts: Saibou 15; Rebs: Zirbes 6 Asts: Akpınar 4	Arena: Tbilisi Sports Palace; Attendance: 8,600; Referees: Sergiy Zashchuk (UKR), Gintaras Vitkauskas (LTU), Luka Kardum (CRO)

25 February 2018	Austria	81–82	Serbia	Schwechat
20:20	Scoring by quarter: 18–21, 25–20, 20–25, 18–16
	Pts: Mahalbašić 22; Rebs: Mahalbašić 9 Asts: Schreiner 7	Boxscore	Pts: Jelovac 21; Rebs: Simonović 5 Asts: Avramović 5	Arena: Multiversum; Attendance: 3,000; Referees: Panagiotis Anastopoulos (GRE), Tanel Suslov (EST), Petr Hrůša (CZE)

29 June 2018	Georgia	50–87	Serbia	Tbilisi
19:00	Scoring by quarter: 11–18, 7–19, 18–23, 14–27
	Pts: McFadden 18; Rebs: Shengelia 8 Asts: Tsintsadze 2	Boxscore	Pts: Todorović 24; Rebs: Micić 7 Asts: Todorović 6	Arena: Tbilisi Sports Palace; Attendance: 8,000; Referees: Tomas Jasevičius (LTU), Marius Ciulin (ROU), Zafer Yılmaz (TUR)

29 June 2018	Germany	85–63	Austria	Braunschweig
19:30	Scoring by quarter: 22–16, 25–17, 14–16, 24–14
	Pts: Schröder 25; Rebs: Barthel, Kleber 6 Asts: Doreth, Voigtmann 3	Boxscore	Pts: Schreiner 14; Rebs: Ogunsipe 6 Asts: Klepeisz 3	Arena: Volkswagen Halle; Attendance: 6,731; Referees: Janusz Calik (POL), Andrei Sharapa (BLR), Ivor Matejek (CZE)

2 July 2018	Georgia	98–73	Austria	Tbilisi
19:00	Scoring by quarter: 26–18, 25–15, 25–19, 22–21
	Pts: Shengelia 24; Rebs: Shengelia 12; Asts: Shengelia 6	Boxscore	Pts: Ogunsipe 18; Rebs: Lanegger 9 Asts: Schreiner 5	Arena: Tbilisi Sports Palace; Attendance: 2,000; Referees: Marek Maliszewski (POL), Ventsislav Velikov (BUL), Zdenko Tomašovič (SVK)

2 July 2018	Serbia	81–88	Germany	Novi Sad
20:00	Scoring by quarter: 23–21, 18–14, 19–21, 21–32
	Pts: Marjanović 22; Rebs: Marjanović 11; Asts: Micić 10	Boxscore	Pts: Schröder 21; Rebs: Kleber 7 Asts: Schröder 6	Arena: SPC Vojvodina; Attendance: 8,800; Referees: Manuel Mazzoni (ITA), Andris Aunkrogers (LAT), Ciprian Stoica (ROU)

==== Group H ====
Pos	Team	Pld	W	L	PF	PA	PD	Pts	Qualification
1	Greece	6	6	0	513	432	+81	12	Advance to the second round
2	Israel	6	3	3	438	458	−20	9	Advance to the second round
3	Estonia	6	2	4	415	459	−44	8	Advance to the second round
4	Great Britain	6	1	5	440	457	−17	7	Relegated to the EuroBasket Pre-Qualifiers second round

Source: FIBA
Rules for classification: 1) Points; 2) Head-to-head results; 3) Points difference; 4) Points scored.

24 November 2017	Israel	88–68	Estonia	Tel Aviv
14:00	Scoring by quarter: 21–21, 17–14, 27–19, 23–14
	Pts: Howell 19; Rebs: Cohen, Howell 7 Asts: Howell 7	Boxscore	Pts: Kitsing, Veideman 14; Rebs: Veideman 6 Asts: Veideman 5	Arena: Drive in Arena; Attendance: 3,000; Referees: Yener Yılmaz (TUR), Petar Obradović (BIH), Marius Ciulin (ROU)

24 November 2017	Great Britain	92–95(OT)	Greece	Leicester
19:30	Scoring by quarter: 17–17, 20–20, 17–18, 29–28, Overtime: 9–12
	Pts: Clark 17; Rebs: Soko 9 Asts: Lawrence, Okereafor 6	Boxscore	Pts: Bourousis 27; Rebs: Bourousis 8 Asts: Athinaiou 5	Arena: Leicester Arena; Attendance: 2,400; Referees: Ademir Zurapović (BIH), Gintaras Vitkauskas (LTU), Luka Kardum (CRO)

27 November 2017	Greece	82–61	Israel	Heraklion
17:00	Scoring by quarter: 15–18, 22–14, 22–15, 23–14
	Pts: Giannopoulos 13; Rebs: Mavroeidis 6 Asts: Calathes 8	Boxscore	Pts: Howell 13; Rebs: Howell 9 Asts: Blatt 3	Arena: Heraklion Arena; Attendance: 4,000; Referees: Srđan Dožai (CRO), Ciprian Stoica (ROU), Sergei Beliakov (RUS)

27 November 2017	Estonia	73–70	Great Britain	Tallinn
19:00	Scoring by quarter: 18–24, 26–12, 15–21, 14–13
	Pts: Paasoja 15; Rebs: Talts 9 Asts: Sokk 5	Boxscore	Pts: Soko 17; Rebs: Hesson 8 Asts: Okereafor 5	Arena: Kalev Sports Hall; Attendance: 1,640; Referees: Janusz Calik (POL), Petr Hrůša (CZE), Radomir Vojinović (MNE)

23 February 2018	Israel	82–75	Great Britain	Tel Aviv
14:00	Scoring by quarter: 18–20, 25–24, 21–17, 18–14
	Pts: Pnini 18; Rebs: Limonad 6 Asts: Ben-Chimol 5	Boxscore	Pts: Olaseni 19; Rebs: Olaseni 8 Asts: Okereafor 6	Arena: Drive in Arena; Attendance: 3,200; Referees: Aleksandar Glišić (SRB), Aleksandar Milojević (MKD), Dariusz Zapolski (POL)

23 February 2018	Greece	87–75	Estonia	Heraklion
18:30	Scoring by quarter: 20–18, 15–11, 26–13, 26–33
	Pts: Bourousis 21; Rebs: Bourousis 8 Asts: Bochoridis, Bourousis 6	Boxscore	Pts: Sokk 16; Rebs: Talts 5 Asts: Sokk 6	Arena: Heraklion Arena; Attendance: 2,500; Referees: Tomas Jasevičius (LTU), Uroš Nikolić (SRB), Borys Shulga (UKR)

25 February 2018	Estonia	78–62	Israel	Tallinn
17:00	Scoring by quarter: 17–19, 20–14, 19–20, 22–9
	Pts: Olmre 16; Rebs: Talts 10; Asts: Sokk 7	Boxscore	Pts: Cohen 12; Rebs: Mekel 8 Asts: Mekel 4	Arena: Saku Suurhall; Attendance: 2,500; Referees: Yohan Rosso (FRA), Vilius Mačiulaitis (LTU), Arnis Ozols (LAT)

25 February 2018	Greece	75–70	Great Britain	Heraklion
18:00	Scoring by quarter: 20–23, 19–23, 17–12, 19–12
	Pts: Bourousis, Vasilopoulos 15; Rebs: Bourousis 5 Asts: Bourousis 5	Boxscore	Pts: Clark 16; Rebs: Clark 11; Asts: Okereafor 5	Arena: Heraklion Arena; Attendance: 5,000; Referees: Saverio Lanzarini (ITA), Petar Obradović (BIH), Ventsislav Velikov (BUL)

28 June 2018	Israel	78–96	Greece	Tel Aviv
19:40	Scoring by quarter: 17–20, 25–29, 10–24, 26–23
	Pts: Cohen 21; Rebs: Cohen 5 Asts: Blatt 5	Boxscore	Pts: Mitoglu 21; Rebs: Bochoridis 5 Asts: Mantzaris 6	Arena: Menora Mivtachim Arena; Attendance: 6,100; Referees: Antonio Conde (ESP), Gentian Cici (ALB), Radomir Vojinović (MNE)

29 June 2018	Great Britain	74–65	Estonia	Glasgow
19:30	Scoring by quarter: 19–20, 15–19, 20–14, 20–12
	Pts: Clark 20; Rebs: Olaseni 12; Asts: Okereafor 6	Boxscore	Pts: Vene 24; Rebs: Raieste 9 Asts: Veideman 7	Arena: Emirates Arena; Attendance: 1,766; Referees: Lorenzo Baldini (ITA), Özlem Yalman (TUR), Marek Kúkelčík (SVK)

2 July 2018	Estonia	56–78	Greece	Tallinn
19:00	Scoring by quarter: 13–15, 14–20, 21–21, 8–22
	Pts: Raieste 14; Rebs: Kullamäe, Raieste 5 Asts: Kullamäe 3	Boxscore	Pts: T. Antetokounmpo, Mitoglu 18; Rebs: Bochoridis, Mitoglu 7 Asts: four players 3	Arena: Saku Suurhall; Attendance: 3,124; Referees: Srđan Dožai (CRO), Ademir Zurapović (BIH), Fernando Calatrava (ESP)

2 July 2018	Great Britain	59–67	Israel	Glasgow
19:30	Scoring by quarter: 13–18, 20–16, 12–16, 14–17
	Pts: Clark 19; Rebs: Clark 7 Asts: Okereafor 5	Boxscore	Pts: Mekel 20; Rebs: Howell, Menco 9 Asts: Mekel 5	Arena: Emirates Arena; Attendance: 1,306; Referees: Marius Ciulin (ROU), Aleksandar Milojević (MKD), Andrei Sharapa (BLR)

=== Second round ===
The top three teams from each group, from the previous round, were grouped with three top teams from another group. It was composed of four new, home-and-away, round robin groups of six teams. All results from the first round were carried over to the second round. Games were played in September 2018, November 2018, and February 2019. The top three teams from each group qualified for the 2019 FIBA Basketball World Cup.

==== Group I ====
Pos	Team	Pld	W	L	PF	PA	PD	Pts	Qualification
1	Spain	12	10	2	927	848	+79	22	Qualification to the FIBA Basketball World Cup
2	Turkey	12	8	4	874	805	+69	20	Qualification to the FIBA Basketball World Cup
3	Montenegro	12	7	5	918	901	+17	19 (Note: Montenegro 1–1, +3 PD; Latvia 1–1, –3 PD)	Qualification to the FIBA Basketball World Cup
4	Latvia	12	7	5	943	914	+29	19	Qualification to the EuroBasket Qualifiers
5	Ukraine	12	5	7	909	892	+17	17	Qualification to the EuroBasket Qualifiers
6	Slovenia	12	3	9	908	988	−80	15	Qualification to the EuroBasket Qualifiers

Source: FIBA
Rules for classification: 1) Points; 2) Head-to-head results; 3) Points difference; 4) Points scored.
Notes:

14 September 2018	Ukraine	76–65	Spain	Kyiv
19:00	Scoring by quarter: 19–12, 17–22, 20–17, 20–14
	Pts: Mykhailiuk 22; Rebs: Bobrov, Len 5 Asts: Lukashov 5	Boxscore	Pts: Colom 15; Rebs: Oriola 7 Asts: Colom 4	Arena: Palace of Sports; Attendance: 6,500; Referees: Srđan Dožai (CRO), Ademir Zurapović (BIH), Luka Kardum (CRO)

14 September 2018	Latvia	85–74	Slovenia	Riga
19:30	Scoring by quarter: 17–16, 23–20, 20–24, 25–14
	Pts: Strēlnieks, Timma 18; Rebs: Timma 12; Asts: Strēlnieks 10	Boxscore	Pts: Rupnik 19; Rebs: Vidmar 7 Asts: Rebec, Rupnik 4	Arena: Arena Riga; Attendance: 8,200; Referees: Gentian Cici (ALB), Tolga Sahin (ITA), Nicolas Maestre (FRA)

14 September 2018	Turkey	79–69	Montenegro	Ankara
20:00	Scoring by quarter: 26–18, 19–19, 15–19, 19–13
	Pts: Osman 18; Rebs: İlyasova 8 Asts: Wilbekin 6	Boxscore	Pts: Dubljević 22; Rebs: Dubljević 9 Asts: Ivanović 4	Arena: Ankara Arena; Referees: Yohan Rosso (FRA), Marius Ciulin (ROU), Alexey Davydov (RUS)

17 September 2018	Spain	85–82	Latvia	Madrid
19:00	Scoring by quarter: 26–20, 25–17, 16–19, 18–26
	Pts: Colom 18; Rebs: Oriola 11; Asts: Fernández 5	Boxscore	Pts: Strēlnieks, Timma 20; Rebs: Meiers, Timma 7 Asts: Strēlnieks, Timma 3	Arena: WiZink Center; Attendance: 7,900; Referees: Georgios Poursanidis (GRE), Aleksandar Glišić (SRB), Sergei Beliakov (RUS)

17 September 2018	Slovenia	77–86	Turkey	Ljubljana
20:00	Scoring by quarter: 20–22, 18–19, 21–26, 18–19
	Pts: Randolph 24; Rebs: Randolph 12; Asts: Rupnik 6	Boxscore	Pts: Korkmaz 24; Rebs: Osman 11; Asts: Balbay 7	Arena: Arena Stožice; Attendance: 1,000; Referees: Manuel Mazzoni (ITA), Martin Horozov (BUL), Marek Maliszewski (POL)

17 September 2018	Montenegro	90–84	Ukraine	Nikšić
20:15	Scoring by quarter: 16–13, 29–27, 17–18, 28–26
	Pts: Ivanović 30; Rebs: Dubljević 8 Asts: Ivanović 6	Boxscore	Pts: Mykhailiuk 15; Rebs: Len 7 Asts: Lukashov 5	Arena: Nikšić Sport Center; Attendance: 2,500; Referees: Panagiotis Anastopoulos (GRE), Vilius Mačiulaitis (LTU), Gentian Cici (ALB)

29 November 2018	Turkey	71–67	Spain	Ankara
19:00	Scoring by quarter: 15–15, 21–19, 20–14, 15–19
	Pts: Erden 16; Rebs: Erden 14; Asts: Tuncer 8	Boxscore	Pts: Brizuela 18; Rebs: Llovet 12; Asts: Fernández 8	Arena: Ankara Arena; Attendance: 10,000; Referees: Saverio Lanzarini (ITA), Tomas Jasevičius (LTU), Saša Maričić (SRB)

29 November 2018	Ukraine	82–54	Slovenia	Zaporizhzhia
19:00	Scoring by quarter: 22–18, 13–7, 23–9, 24–20
	Pts: Kobets 13; Rebs: Bliznyuk 7 Asts: Lypovyy 8	Boxscore	Pts: Hrovat 13; Rebs: Murić 6 Asts: Rebec 4	Arena: Yunist Palace of Sports; Attendance: 2,800; Referees: Lorenzo Baldini (ITA), Markos Michaelides (SUI), Wojciech Liszka (POL)

29 November 2018	Latvia	75–84	Montenegro	Riga
19:30	Scoring by quarter: 20–24, 21–21, 20–16, 14–23
	Pts: Meiers 27; Rebs: Meiers 4 Asts: Lomažs 7	Boxscore	Pts: Dubljević 22; Rebs: Đurišić, Sekulić 9 Asts: Ivanović 6	Arena: Arena Riga; Attendance: 7,500; Referees: Manuel Mazzoni (ITA), Janusz Calik (POL), Martin Horozov (BUL)

2 December 2018	Spain	72–68	Ukraine	San Cristóbal de La Laguna
17:00	Scoring by quarter: 20–14, 19–17, 15–17, 18–20
	Pts: Fernández 17; Rebs: Aguilar 5 Asts: San Miguel 6	Boxscore	Pts: Bobrov 21; Rebs: Bobrov 8 Asts: Lypovyy 4	Arena: Pabellón Insular Santiago Martín; Attendance: 4,033; Referees: Ademir Zurapović (BIH), Martin Horozov (BUL), Tanel Suslov (EST)

2 December 2018	Slovenia	77–82	Latvia	Ljubljana
17:00	Scoring by quarter: 22–20, 24–9, 16–29, 15–24
	Pts: Rebec 27; Rebs: Rebec 6 Asts: Rebec 7	Boxscore	Pts: Blūms 31; Rebs: Meiers 13; Asts: Bertāns 4	Arena: Arena Stožice; Attendance: 3,500; Referees: Saverio Lanzarini (ITA), Erez Gurion (ISR), Thomas Bissuel (FRA)

2 December 2018	Montenegro	71–66	Turkey	Podgorica
19:00	Scoring by quarter: 13–17, 24–21, 21–17, 13–11
	Pts: Ivanović 21; Rebs: Dubljević 12; Asts: Đurišić, Ivanović 3	Boxscore	Pts: Balbay, Erden 14; Rebs: Erden 6 Asts: Geçim 6	Arena: Morača Sports Center; Attendance: 4,500; Referees: Georgios Poursanidis (GRE), Nicolas Maestre (FRA), Marius Ciulin (ROU)

22 February 2019	Turkey	77–58	Slovenia	Ankara
19:00	Scoring by quarter: 11–17, 23–9, 24–16, 19–16
	Pts: Tuncer 22; Rebs: Birsen, Tuncer 8 Asts: Güler 5	Boxscore	Pts: Hrovat 12; Rebs: Kosi 9 Asts: Rebec 4	Arena: Ankara Arena; Attendance: 9,157; Referees: Srđan Dožai (CRO), Gentian Cici (ALB), Zdenko Tomašovič (SVK)

22 February 2019	Ukraine	74–76	Montenegro	Kyiv
19:00	Scoring by quarter: 34–17, 6–9, 16–25, 18–25
	Pts: Bobrov 19; Rebs: Bobrov 6 Asts: Lukashov 9	Boxscore	Pts: Needham 26; Rebs: Todorović 10; Asts: P. Popović 4	Arena: Palace of Sports; Attendance: 6,512; Referees: Yohan Rosso (FRA), Tolga Şahin (ITA), Michał Proc (POL)

22 February 2019	Latvia	62–67	Spain	Riga
19:30	Scoring by quarter: 14–25, 11–13, 16–13, 21–16
	Pts: Šķēle 18; Rebs: Meiers 9 Asts: Šķēle 3	Boxscore	Pts: Brizuela 17; Rebs: Saiz 14; Asts: Colom 3	Arena: Arena Riga; Attendance: 10,200; Referees: Lorenzo Baldini (ITA), Georgios Poursanidis (GRE), Petr Hrůša (CZE)

25 February 2019	Spain	74–58	Turkey	San Cristóbal de La Laguna
18:30	Scoring by quarter: 25–16, 22–20, 12–6, 15–16
	Pts: Brizuela 16; Rebs: Llovet 7 Asts: Colom 7	Boxscore	Pts: Erden 16; Rebs: Tuncer 7 Asts: Geçim, Tuncer 4	Arena: Pabellón Insular Santiago Martín; Attendance: 3,451; Referees: Manuel Mazzoni (ITA), Dariusz Zapolski (POL), Ademir Zurapović (BIH)

25 February 2019	Montenegro	74–80	Latvia	Podgorica
19:00	Scoring by quarter: 8–16, 23–20, 24–24, 19–20
	Pts: Needham 22; Rebs: Šehović 7 Asts: Needham 2	Boxscore	Pts: Strēlnieks 25; Rebs: Meiers, Strēlnieks 5 Asts: Strēlnieks 10	Arena: Morača Sports Center; Attendance: 5,280; Referees: Panagiotis Anastopoulos (GRE), Marek Cmikiewicz (POL), Wojciech Liszka (POL)

25 February 2019	Slovenia	85–84(OT)	Ukraine	Ljubljana
19:00	Scoring by quarter: 17–20, 13–21, 18–17, 28–18, Overtime: 9–8
	Pts: Murić 16; Rebs: Murić 10; Asts: Rebec 6	Boxscore	Pts: Kravtsov 16; Rebs: Kravtsov 12; Asts: Bobrov, Lukashov 4	Arena: Arena Stožice; Attendance: 3,800; Referees: Georgios Poursanidis (GRE), Tomas Jasevičius (LTU), Vilius Mačiulaitis (LTU)

==== Group J ====
Pos	Team	Pld	W	L	PF	PA	PD	Pts	Qualification
1	Lithuania	12	11	1	999	802	+197	23	Qualification to the FIBA Basketball World Cup
2	Italy	12	8	4	940	836	+104	20 (Note: Italy 1–1, +3 PD; Poland 1–1, –3 PD)	Qualification to the FIBA Basketball World Cup
3	Poland	12	8	4	958	886	+72	20	Qualification to the FIBA Basketball World Cup
4	Hungary	12	6	6	836	849	−13	18	Qualification to the EuroBasket Qualifiers
5	Croatia	12	4	8	858	891	−33	16	Qualification to the EuroBasket Qualifiers
6	Netherlands	12	3	9	895	944	−49	15	Qualification to the EuroBasket Qualifiers

Source: FIBA
Rules for classification: 1) Points; 2) Head-to-head results; 3) Points difference; 4) Points scored.
Notes:

14 September 2018	Netherlands	59–74	Hungary	Almere
20:00	Scoring by quarter: 13–21, 21–20, 11–13, 14–20
	Pts: Franke 18; Rebs: Van der Mars 9 Asts: Kloof 3	Boxscore	Pts: Vojvoda 23; Rebs: Keller 5 Asts: Perl, Vojvoda 4	Arena: Topsportcentrum; Attendance: 2,713; Referees: Panagiotis Anastopoulos (GRE), Luis Castillo (ESP), Zdenko Tomašovič (SVK)

14 September 2018	Croatia	83–84	Lithuania	Osijek
20:15	Scoring by quarter: 21–21, 15–22, 19–20, 28–21
	Pts: Bogdanović 22; Rebs: Šarić 6 Asts: Šarić 5	Boxscore	Pts: Bendžius 16; Rebs: Kuzminskas 6 Asts: Kalnietis 5	Arena: Gradski vrt Hall; Attendance: 4,100; Referees: Antonio Conde (ESP), Zafer Yılmaz (TUR), Martin Horozov (BUL)

14 September 2018	Italy	101–82	Poland	Bologna
20:15	Scoring by quarter: 25–25, 29–27, 19–13, 28–17
	Pts: Della Valle 28; Rebs: Melli 6 Asts: L. Vitali 6	Boxscore	Pts: Slaughter 28; Rebs: Cel 6 Asts: Ponitka 4	Arena: PalaDozza; Attendance: 5,000; Referees: Aleksandar Glišić (SRB), Andris Aunkrogers (LAT), Sasa Maričić (SRB)

17 September 2018	Hungary	63–69	Italy	Debrecen
18:00	Scoring by quarter: 14–20, 14–19, 23–13, 12–17
	Pts: Vojvoda 25; Rebs: Golomán 7 Asts: Govens 4	Boxscore	Pts: Datome 18; Rebs: Brooks, Datome 7 Asts: L. Vitali 7	Arena: Főnix Hall; Attendance: 5,652; Referees: Ademir Zurapović (BIH), Nicolas Maestre (FRA), Oskars Lūsis (LAT)

17 September 2018	Lithuania	95–93(OT)	Netherlands	Vilnius
19:30	Scoring by quarter: 24–16, 15–23, 18–16, 18–20, Overtime: 9–9, 11–9
	Pts: Kalnietis 21; Rebs: Giedraitis, Gudaitis 6 Asts: Juškevičius, Kalnietis 5	Boxscore	Pts: Kloof 19; Rebs: Kok 9 Asts: Franke 6	Arena: Siemens Arena; Attendance: 4,905; Referees: Boris Krejič (SLO), Andrei Sharapa (BLR), Sasa Maričić (SRB)

17 September 2018	Poland	79–74	Croatia	Gdańsk
21:00	Scoring by quarter: 21–21, 10–15, 23–22, 25–16
	Pts: Waczyński 21; Rebs: Hrycaniuk 9 Asts: Łączyński 6	Boxscore	Pts: Bogdanović 22; Rebs: Žižić 8 Asts: Bogdanović 5	Arena: Ergo Arena; Attendance: 3,290; Referees: Yohan Rosso (FRA), Mārtiņš Kozlovskis (LAT), Fernando Calatrava (ESP)

29 November 2018	Croatia	74–69	Hungary	Osijek
18:00	Scoring by quarter: 22–15, 22–23, 18–12, 12–19
	Pts: Bilan 22; Rebs: Bilan 14; Asts: Junaković 6	Boxscore	Pts: Perl 20; Rebs: Allen 6 Asts: Perl 4	Arena: Gradski vrt Hall; Attendance: 3,000; Referees: Georgios Poursanidis (GRE), Yener Yılmaz (TUR), Gentian Cici (ALB)

29 November 2018	Netherlands	78–105	Poland	's-Hertogenbosch
20:00	Scoring by quarter: 18–27, 19–26, 24–26, 17–26
	Pts: Kloof 21; Rebs: Kherazzi 7 Asts: Kloof 8	Boxscore	Pts: Cel 20; Rebs: Lampe 7 Asts: Koszarek 7	Arena: De Maaspoort; Attendance: 2,500; Referees: Nicolas Maestre (FRA), Sergiy Zashchuk (UKR), Tanel Suslov (EST)

29 November 2018	Italy	70–65	Lithuania	Brescia
20:15	Scoring by quarter: 20–24, 22–11, 11–18, 17–12
	Pts: Awudu 13; Rebs: Aradori, Polonara 7 Asts: L. Vitali 8	Boxscore	Pts: Kalnietis 15; Rebs: Mačiulis 10; Asts: Kalnietis 6	Arena: PalaLeonessa; Attendance: 5,000; Referees: Panagiotis Anastopoulos (GRE), Radomir Vojinović (MNE), Steve Bittner (GER)

2 December 2018	Hungary	91–86(OT)	Netherlands	Budapest
16:00	Scoring by quarter: 12–15, 22–14, 22–24, 22–25, Overtime: 13–8
	Pts: Vojvoda 22; Rebs: Allen 10; Asts: Allen 5	Boxscore	Pts: Franke 23; Rebs: Van der Mars 11; Asts: Kloof 7	Arena: Tüskecsarnok; Attendance: 3,500; Referees: Aleksandar Glišić (SRB), Andris Aunkrogers (LAT), Gatis Saliņš (LAT)

2 December 2018	Lithuania	79–62	Croatia	Vilnius
19:30	Scoring by quarter: 26–11, 17–28, 24–10, 12–13
	Pts: Seibutis 15; Rebs: Echodas 10; Asts: Kalnietis 7	Boxscore	Pts: Bilan 12; Rebs: Mustapić 6 Asts: Mustapić 3	Arena: Siemens Arena; Attendance: 4,578; Referees: Antonio Conde (ESP), Alexey Davydov (RUS), Luis Castillo (ESP)

2 December 2018	Poland	94–78	Italy	Gdańsk
20:15	Scoring by quarter: 31–18, 21–23, 21–24, 21–13
	Pts: Lampe 22; Rebs: Lampe 8 Asts: Slaughter 11	Boxscore	Pts: Abass, Aradori 13; Rebs: three players 4 Asts: Vitali 4	Arena: Ergo Arena; Attendance: 4,957; Referees: Gentian Cici (ALB), Boris Krejić (SLO), Saša Maričić (SRB)

22 February 2019	Croatia	69–77	Poland	Varaždin
18:00	Scoring by quarter: 16–8, 20–24, 23–29, 10–16
	Pts: Krušlin 21; Rebs: Bilan 8 Asts: Katić 3	Boxscore	Pts: Ponitka 20; Rebs: Lampe, Ponitka 8 Asts: Slaughter 5	Arena: Varaždin Arena; Attendance: 3,250; Referees: Panagiotis Anastopoulos (GRE), Oskars Lūsis (LAT), Erez Gurion (ISR)

22 February 2019	Netherlands	69–78	Lithuania	Amsterdam
20:00	Scoring by quarter: 20–25, 15–20, 14–17, 20–16
	Pts: Kloof 17; Rebs: Kherrazi 9 Asts: Kloof 5	Boxscore	Pts: Seibutis 20; Rebs: Bendžius 7 Asts: Giedraitis 4	Arena: Sporthallen Zuid; Attendance: 3,012; Referees: Yener Yılmaz (TUR), Zdravko Rutešić (MNE), Sébastien Clivaz (SUI)

22 February 2019	Italy	75–41	Hungary	Varese
20:15	Scoring by quarter: 15–9, 19–6, 18–18, 23–8
	Pts: Della Valle 15; Rebs: Brooks 8 Asts: L. Vitali 4	Boxscore	Pts: Vojvoda 15; Rebs: Eilingsfeld 6 Asts: Eilingsfeld 2	Arena: Palasport Lino Oldrini; Attendance: 5,000; Referees: Antonio Conde (ESP), Fernando Calatrava (ESP), Carsten Straube (GER)

25 February 2019	Hungary	84–65	Croatia	Szombathely
18:30	Scoring by quarter: 24–16, 24–17, 18–15, 18–17
	Pts: Vojvoda 21; Rebs: Eilingsfeld, Keller 8 Asts: Perl 11	Boxscore	Pts: Katić 14; Rebs: three players 5 Asts: Katić 4	Arena: Arena Savaria; Attendance: 3,000; Referees: Yohan Rosso (FRA), Sergiy Zashchuk (UKR), Markos Michaelides (SUI)

25 February 2019	Lithuania	86–73	Italy	Klaipėda
19:30	Scoring by quarter: 26–16, 21–13, 14–22, 25–22
	Pts: Masiulis 15; Rebs: Giedraitis 7 Asts: Janavičius, Vasiliauskas 5	Boxscore	Pts: M. Vitali 22; Rebs: M. Vitali 4 Asts: Filloy 6	Arena: Švyturio Arena; Attendance: 5,500; Referees: Aleksandar Glišić (SRB), Kerem Baki (TUR), Zdenko Tomašovič (SVK)

25 February 2019	Poland	85–76	Netherlands	Gdańsk
20:30	Scoring by quarter: 26–16, 20–20, 20–14, 19–26
	Pts: Waczyński 18; Rebs: Sokołowski 6 Asts: Koszarek, Slaughter 6	Boxscore	Pts: Hammink, Schaftenaar 12; Rebs: Mast 5 Asts: De Jong, Van der Vuurst de Vries 4	Arena: Ergo Arena; Attendance: 5,017; Referees: Marius Ciulin (ROU), Andrei Sharapa (BLR), Apostolos Kalpakas (SWE)

==== Group K ====
Pos	Team	Pld	W	L	PF	PA	PD	Pts	Qualification
1	France	12	10	2	937	778	+159	22	Qualification to the FIBA Basketball World Cup
2	Russia	12	8	4	966	853	+113	20 (Note: Russia 1–1, +18 PD; Czech Republic 1–1, –18 PD)	Qualification to the FIBA Basketball World Cup
3	Czech Republic	12	8	4	890	889	+1	20	Qualification to the FIBA Basketball World Cup
4	Finland	12	6	6	913	927	−14	18	Qualification to the EuroBasket Qualifiers
5	Bulgaria	12	4	8	882	971	−89	16	Qualification to the EuroBasket Qualifiers
6	Bosnia and Herzegovina	12	3	9	871	957	−86	15	Qualification to the EuroBasket Qualifiers

Source: FIBA
Rules for classification: 1) Points; 2) Head-to-head results; 3) Points difference; 4) Points scored.
Notes:

13 September 2018	Bulgaria	74–68	France	Botevgrad
18:00	Scoring by quarter: 26–23, 19–21, 14–14, 15–10
	Pts: Bost 17; Rebs: Vezenkov 8 Asts: Dimitrov 5	Boxscore	Pts: Batum 17; Rebs: Lacombe 7 Asts: Batum 5	Arena: Arena Botevgrad; Attendance: 2,800; Referees: Janusz Calik (POL), Radomir Vojinović (MNE), Dariusz Zapolski (POL)

13 September 2018	Czech Republic	80–78	Russia	Pardubice
18:00	Scoring by quarter: 27–24, 10–15, 19–19, 24–20
	Pts: Bohačík 19; Rebs: Satoranský 8 Asts: Satoranský 6	Boxscore	Pts: Khvostov 18; Rebs: Khvostov 4 Asts: Shved 7	Arena: Tipsport arena Attendance: 8,438; Referees: Manuel Mazzoni (ITA), Yener Yılmaz (TUR), Gintaras Vitkauskas (LTU)

13 September 2018	Finland	85–81	Bosnia and Herzegovina	Espoo
19:00	Scoring by quarter: 22–14, 21–20, 27–15, 15–32
	Pts: Salin 27; Rebs: Jantunen 6 Asts: Koponen 7	Boxscore	Pts: Nurkić 20; Rebs: Nurkić 9 Asts: Musa 9	Arena: Espoo Metro Areena; Attendance: 6,305; Referees: Georgios Poursanidis (GRE), Tanel Suslov (EST), Vilius Mačiulaitis (LTU)

16 September 2018	France	83–67	Finland	Montpellier
17:05	Scoring by quarter: 25–13, 25–11, 17–27, 16–16
	Pts: Batum, Kahudi 14; Rebs: Lessort, Poirier 6 Asts: Albicy 7	Boxscore	Pts: Koponen, Murphy 14; Rebs: Huff 7 Asts: Huff, Koponen 3	Arena: Sud de France Arena; Attendance: 6,634; Referees: Lorenzo Baldini (ITA), Erez Gurion (ISR), Gatis Saliņš (LAT)

16 September 2018	Russia	77–73	Bulgaria	Khimki
18:00	Scoring by quarter: 30–20, 17–20, 15–20, 15–13
	Pts: Shved 22; Rebs: Shved 7 Asts: Shved 5	Boxscore	Pts: Vezenkov 22; Rebs: Vezenkov 12; Asts: three players 3	Arena: Khimki Basketball Center; Attendance: 3,156; Referees: Srđan Dožai (CRO), Apostolos Kalpakas (SWE), Wojciech Liszka (POL)

16 September 2018	Bosnia and Herzegovina	80–85	Czech Republic	Sarajevo
20:00	Scoring by quarter: 18–22, 19–16, 23–22, 20–25
	Pts: Nurkić 19; Rebs: Nurkić 15; Asts: Musa 5	Boxscore	Pts: Satoranský 22; Rebs: Satoranský 9 Asts: Satoranský 7	Arena: Mirza Delibašić Hall; Referees: Tomas Jasevičius (LTU), Janusz Calik (POL), Luis Castillo (ESP)

30 November 2018	Czech Republic	65–79	France	Pardubice
18:00	Scoring by quarter: 19–26, 18–13, 14–13, 14–27
	Pts: Hruban 20; Rebs: Hruban 8 Asts: Bohačík 8	Boxscore	Pts: M'Baye 18; Rebs: Camara 8 Asts: Albicy 7	Arena: Tipsport arena Attendance: 5,371; Referees: Srđan Dožai (CRO), Oskars Lūsis (LAT), Vilius Mačiulaitis (LTU)

30 November 2018	Finland	75–77(OT)	Russia	Espoo
19:00	Scoring by quarter: 18–13, 18–14, 21–20, 11–21, Overtime: 7–9
	Pts: Huff 24; Rebs: Murphy 7 Asts: Salin, Wilson 5	Boxscore	Pts: Kulagin 26; Rebs: Vorontsevich 8 Asts: Vorontsevich 6	Arena: Espoo Metro Areena; Attendance: 6,866; Referees: Aleksandar Glišić (SRB), Tolga Şahin (ITA), Dariusz Zapolski (POL)

30 November 2018	Bulgaria	89–82	Bosnia and Herzegovina	Botevgrad
19:00	Scoring by quarter: 25–22, 20–29, 27–16, 17–15
	Pts: Avramov 20; Rebs: S. Marinov 8 Asts: S. Marinov 5	Boxscore	Pts: Halilović 20; Rebs: Sulejmanović 16; Asts: Atić 7	Arena: Arena Botevgrad; Attendance: 2,000; Referees: Mārtiņš Kozlovskis (LAT), Marek Cmikiewicz (POL), Zdenko Tomašovič (SVK)

3 December 2018	Russia	81–61	Czech Republic	Khimki
19:30	Scoring by quarter: 14–16, 30–12, 21–11, 16–22
	Pts: Khvostov 17; Rebs: Kulagin 9 Asts: Kulagin 7	Boxscore	Pts: Bohačík 26; Rebs: Kříž, Pumprla 7 Asts: Pulpan 5	Arena: Khimki Basketball Center; Attendance: 2,573; Referees: Panagiotis Anastopoulos (GRE), Fernando Calatrava (ESP), Vladimir Jevtović (SRB)

3 December 2018	France	77–53	Bulgaria	Limoges
19:00	Scoring by quarter: 19–16, 20–13, 17–16, 21–8
	Pts: Ouattara 17; Rebs: Lacombe, Lessort 6 Asts: Lacombe 7	Boxscore	Pts: Zahariev 13; Rebs: Zahariev 7 Asts: S. Marinov 3	Arena: Palais des Sports de Beaublanc; Attendance: 4,633; Referees: Tolga Şahin (ITA), Luka Kardum (CRO), Beniamino Attard (ITA)

3 December 2018	Bosnia and Herzegovina	77–81	Finland	Zenica
19:00	Scoring by quarter: 28–11, 22–20, 13–14, 14–36
	Pts: Halilović 20; Rebs: Sulejmanović 13; Asts: Atić 4	Boxscore	Pts: Salin 19; Rebs: Salin 5 Asts: Koponen 4	Arena: Arena Zenica; Attendance: 1,500; Referees: Yener Yılmaz (TUR), Gintaras Vitkauskas (LTU), Zafer Yılmaz (TUR)

21 February 2019	Bulgaria	60–104	Russia	Botevgrad
18:00	Scoring by quarter: 18–26, 12–26, 14–30, 16–22
	Pts: Washburn 19; Rebs: Dimitrov 3 Asts: Avramov 6	Boxscore	Pts: Kulagin 16; Rebs: Vorontsevich 7 Asts: Vorontsevich 5	Arena: Arena Botevgrad; Attendance: 1,800; Referees: Manuel Mazzoni (ITA), Zafer Yılmaz (TUR), Boris Krejič (SLO)

21 February 2019	Czech Republic	69–64	Bosnia and Herzegovina	Pardubice
18:00	Scoring by quarter: 20–15, 19–18, 16–17, 14–14
	Pts: Bohačík 17; Rebs: Hruban 9 Asts: Vyoral 4	Boxscore	Pts: Lazić 16; Rebs: Halilović 12; Asts: Atić, Gegić 5	Arena: Tipsport arena Attendance: 2,821; Referees: Wojciech Liszka (POL), Apostolos Kalpakas (SWE), Mehmet Karabilecen (TUR)

21 February 2019	Finland	76–69	France	Espoo
19:00	Scoring by quarter: 14–14, 17–19, 22–15, 23–21
	Pts: Wilson 29; Rebs: Jantunen 7 Asts: Wilson 6	Boxscore	Pts: Noua 19; Rebs: Lessort 10; Asts: Albicy 6	Arena: Espoo Metro Areena; Attendance: 7,009; Referees: Sergiy Zashchuk (UKR), Saša Maričić (SRB), Tanel Suslov (EST)

24 February 2019	France	82–66	Czech Republic	Rezé
17:00	Scoring by quarter: 16–15, 21–17, 21–18, 24–16
	Pts: Lessort 18; Rebs: Lessort 10; Asts: Albicy 6	Boxscore	Pts: Auda 20; Rebs: Krejčí 6 Asts: Hruban 3	Arena: Salle de la Trocardière; Attendance: 4,522; Referees: Boris Krejič (SLO), Zdravko Rutešić (MNE), Luis Castillo (ESP)

24 February 2019	Russia	91–76	Finland	Perm
18:00	Scoring by quarter: 16–28, 21–10, 21–27, 33–11
	Pts: Kulagin 22; Rebs: Kurbanov 7 Asts: four players 4	Boxscore	Pts: Wilson 18; Rebs: Kotti 8 Asts: Koponen 4	Arena: Universal Sports Palace Molot; Attendance: 7,180; Referees: Saverio Lanzarini (ITA), Radomir Vojinović (MNE), Janusz Calik (POL)

24 February 2019	Bosnia and Herzegovina	87–67	Bulgaria	Zenica
18:00	Scoring by quarter: 24–25, 19–10, 22–19, 22–13
	Pts: Atić 29; Rebs: Atić, Halilović 9 Asts: Atić 5	Boxscore	Pts: Zahariev 16; Rebs: Dimitrov 7 Asts: three players 2	Arena: Arena Zenica; Attendance: 2,000; Referees: Lorenzo Baldini (ITA), Andris Aunkrogers (LAT), Michał Proc (POL)

==== Group L ====
Pos	Team	Pld	W	L	PF	PA	PD	Pts	Qualification
1	Greece	12	11	1	972	880	+92	23	Qualification to the FIBA Basketball World Cup
2	Germany	12	9	3	1017	867	+150	21	Qualification to the FIBA Basketball World Cup
3	Serbia	12	7	5	993	875	+118	19	Qualification to the FIBA Basketball World Cup
4	Georgia	12	5	7	927	968	−41	17 (Note: Georgia 2–0; Israel 0–2)	Qualification to the EuroBasket Qualifiers
5	Israel	12	5	7	925	974	−49	17	Qualification to the EuroBasket Qualifiers
6	Estonia	12	4	8	821	950	−129	16	Qualification to the EuroBasket Qualifiers

Source: FIBA
Rules for classification: 1) Points; 2) Head-to-head results; 3) Points difference; 4) Points scored.
Notes:

13 September 2018	Estonia	43–86	Germany	Tallinn
19:00	Scoring by quarter: 15–26, 9–23, 6–24, 13–13
	Pts: Veideman 14; Rebs: Nurger, Veideman 4 Asts: Kotsar 4	Boxscore	Pts: Schröder 18; Rebs: Barthel 8 Asts: Schröder 10	Arena: Saku Suurhall; Attendance: 3,312; Referees: Tomas Jasevičius (LTU), Oskars Lūsis (LAT), Sergei Beliakov (RUS)

13 September 2018	Greece	70–63	Serbia	Heraklion
21:00	Scoring by quarter: 16–18, 19–14, 16–15, 19–16
	Pts: Calathes, Printezis 15; Rebs: Bourousis 10; Asts: Bourousis 8	Boxscore	Pts: Bogdanović 19; Rebs: Bjelica 12; Asts: Bjelica 5	Arena: Heraklion Arena; Attendance: 2,000; Referees: Sergiy Zashchuk (UKR), Mārtiņš Kozlovskis (LAT), Marek Cmikiewicz (POL)

13 September 2018	Israel	80–85	Georgia	Tel Aviv
20:00	Scoring by quarter: 23–26, 14–23, 31–16, 12–20
	Pts: Cohen, Zoosman 14; Rebs: Ariel, Zoosman 5 Asts: Blatt 10	Boxscore	Pts: Shengelia 22; Rebs: Bitadze, Shengelia 9 Asts: Tsintsadze 7	Arena: Menora Mivtachim Arena; Referees: Boris Krejič (SLO), Özlem Yalman (TUR), Fernando Calatrava (ESP)

16 September 2018	Germany	112–98(OT)	Israel	Leipzig
18:00	Scoring by quarter: 18–21, 17–33, 27–16, 30–22, Overtime: 20–6
	Pts: Schröder 30; Rebs: Kleber 8 Asts: Schröder 13	Boxscore	Pts: Cohen 23; Rebs: Levi 8 Asts: Blatt 9	Arena: Arena Leipzig; Attendance: 5,197; Referees: Tolga Şahin (ITA), Gintaras Vitkauskas (LTU), Zdravko Rutešić (MNE)

16 September 2018	Georgia	85–86	Greece	Tbilisi
19:00	Scoring by quarter: 30–17, 19–21, 15–27, 21–21
	Pts: Shengelia 24; Rebs: Shengelia 14; Asts: Tsintsadze 7	Boxscore	Pts: Calathes 31; Rebs: Sloukas 8 Asts: Sloukas 8	Arena: Tbilisi Sports Palace; Attendance: 8,650; Referees: Saverio Lanzarini (ITA), Andris Aunkrogers (LAT), Michał Proc (POL)

16 September 2018	Serbia	91–65	Estonia	Belgrade
20:15	Scoring by quarter: 22–16, 23–13, 29–11, 17–25
	Pts: Bjelica 14; Rebs: Bjelica 6 Asts: Jović, Micić 4	Boxscore	Pts: Kajupank 17; Rebs: Raieste 4 Asts: Kullamäe, Veideman 5	Arena: Aleksandar Nikolić Hall; Attendance: 5,700; Referees: Antonio Conde (ESP), Yener Yılmaz (TUR), Mehmet Karabilecen (TUR)

30 November 2018	Israel	83–74	Serbia	Tel Aviv
14:00	Scoring by quarter: 29–24, 14–21, 16–15, 24–14
	Pts: Pnini 18; Rebs: four players 3 Asts: Blatt 9	Boxscore	Pts: Milosavljević 17; Rebs: Peno 8 Asts: Peno 6	Arena: Drive in Arena; Attendance: 3,500; Referees: Yohan Rosso (FRA), Marius Ciulin (ROU), Zafer Yılmaz (TUR)

30 November 2018	Greece	92–84	Germany	Patras
19:00	Scoring by quarter: 23–22, 22–13, 18–21, 29–28
	Pts: Bourousis 25; Rebs: Bourousis 7 Asts: Athinaiou 6	Boxscore	Pts: Benzing 27; Rebs: Thiemann 7 Asts: Akpınar, Benzing 3	Arena: Dimitris Tofalos Arena; Attendance: 3,100; Referees: Antonio Conde (ESP), Fernando Calatrava (ESP), Boris Krejič (SLO)

30 November 2018	Estonia	73–80	Georgia	Tallinn
19:00	Scoring by quarter: 19–22, 13–19, 17–16, 24–23
	Pts: Jõesaar 14; Rebs: Jõesaar, Kangur 7 Asts: four players 3	Boxscore	Pts: Shermadini 23; Rebs: Bitadze, Shermadini 11; Asts: Tsintsadze 7	Arena: Saku Suurhall; Attendance: 2,300; Referees: Ademir Zurapović (BIH), Alexey Davydov (RUS), Martin Vulić (CRO)

3 December 2018	Georgia	71–69(OT)	Israel	Tbilisi
19:00	Scoring by quarter: 9–11, 25–19, 16–19, 14–15, Overtime: 7–5
	Pts: Bitadze 18; Rebs: Shermadini 11; Asts: McFadden 5	Boxscore	Pts: Cohen 22; Rebs: Cohen 8 Asts: DiBartolomeo 4	Arena: Tbilisi Sports Palace; Attendance: 7,135; Referees: Mārtiņš Kozlovskis (LAT), Mehmet Karabilecen (TUR), Dariusz Zapolski (POL)

3 December 2018	Germany	87–70	Estonia	Ludwigsburg
20:00	Scoring by quarter: 21–19, 20–8, 20–12, 26–31
	Pts: Thiemann 16; Rebs: Thiemann 7 Asts: Doreth 4	Boxscore	Pts: Vene 18; Rebs: Jõesaar 6 Asts: Sokk 4	Arena: Arena Ludwigsburg; Attendance: 3,491; Referees: Yohan Rosso (FRA), Vilius Mačiulaitis (LTU), Blaž Zupančič (SLO)

3 December 2018	Serbia	84–61	Greece	Belgrade
20:15	Scoring by quarter: 29–14, 15–21, 23–13, 17–13
	Pts: Jović 22; Rebs: Jelovac 7 Asts: Micić, Raduljica 6	Boxscore	Pts: Bochoridis, Saloustros 12; Rebs: Vasilopoulos 5 Asts: Larentzakis, Vasilopoulos 4	Arena: Aleksandar Nikolić Hall; Attendance: 5,780; Referees: Manuel Mazzoni (ITA), Marek Cmikiewicz (POL), Lorenzo Baldini (ITA)

21 February 2019	Estonia	71–70	Serbia	Tallinn
19:00	Scoring by quarter: 14–16, 17–18, 18–20, 22–16
	Pts: Kitsing, Kullamäe 18; Rebs: Jõesaar 9 Asts: Raieste 5	Boxscore	Pts: Jelovac 19; Rebs: Jelovac 8 Asts: Teodosić 10	Arena: Saku Suurhall; Attendance: 5,426; Referees: Saverio Lanzarini (ITA), Mārtiņš Kozlovskis (LAT), Dariusz Zapolski (POL)

21 February 2019	Israel	81–77	Germany	Tel Aviv
19:30	Scoring by quarter: 15–19, 21–16, 18–17, 27–25
	Pts: Cline 14; Rebs: Ginat 6 Asts: Timor 6	Boxscore	Pts: Giffey, Obst 16; Rebs: Thiemann 5 Asts: Akpınar 8	Arena: Drive in Arena; Attendance: 2,569; Referees: Ademir Zurapović (BIH), Janusz Calik (POL), Ventsislav Velikov (BUL)

21 February 2019	Greece	81–69	Georgia	Heraklion
20:30	Scoring by quarter: 23–14, 21–17, 22–20, 15–18
	Pts: Vasilopoulos 15; Rebs: Bourousis 10; Asts: Bourousis 6	Boxscore	Pts: Shermadini 26; Rebs: Shermadini 15; Asts: Tsintsadze 7	Arena: Heraklion Arena; Attendance: 3,264; Referees: Marius Ciulin (ROU), Luis Castillo (ESP), Andrei Sharapa (BLR)

24 February 2019	Serbia	97–76	Israel	Belgrade
16:00	Scoring by quarter: 26–18, 23–15, 18–17, 30–26
	Pts: Lučić 22; Rebs: Jelovac 6 Asts: Teodosić 9	Boxscore	Pts: Cohen 16; Rebs: Cline 6 Asts: Zoosman 5	Arena: Aleksandar Nikolić Hall; Attendance: 6,890; Referees: Antonio Conde (ESP), Yener Yılmaz (TUR), Fernando Calatrava (ESP)

24 February 2019	Germany	63–69	Greece	Bamberg
18:00	Scoring by quarter: 16–15, 18–18, 13–17, 16–19
	Pts: Obst 12; Rebs: Zirbes 8 Asts: Akpınar 7	Boxscore	Pts: Margaritis 13; Rebs: Mavroeidis 9 Asts: Athinaiou, Koniaris 4	Arena: Brose Arena; Attendance: 5,137; Referees: Mārtiņš Kozlovskis (LAT), Nicolas Maestre (FRA), Sergei Beliakov (RUS)

24 February 2019	Georgia	77–84	Estonia	Tbilisi
19:00	Scoring by quarter: 27–21, 15–27, 20–12, 15–24
	Pts: Shermadini 22; Rebs: Shermadini 15; Asts: Tsintsadze 5	Boxscore	Pts: Kullamäe 18; Rebs: Kitsing 8 Asts: Kullamäe 5	Arena: Tbilisi Sports Palace; Attendance: 4,780; Referees: Oskars Lūsis (LAT), Zafer Yılmaz (TUR), Luka Kardum (CRO)

== Statistical leaders ==
As of 25 February 2019

=== Player averages ===
Category	Player	Team	Average
Points	Martin Hermannsson	Iceland	21.5
Rebounds	Emanuel Cățe	Romania	10.2
Assists	Jamar Wilson	Finland	6.4
Steals	Yovel Zoosman	Israel	2.6
Blocks	Emanuel Cățe	Romania	2.0
Minutes	Sasha Vezenkov	Bulgaria	35.0
Efficiency	Emanuel Cățe	Romania	22.5

=== Team averages ===
Category	Team	Average
Points	Germany	84.8
Rebounds	Spain	39.4
Assists	France	21.7
Steals	Greece	10.2
Blocks	Ukraine	3.8
Efficiency	Lithuania	100.7
