= Mike Moser =

American basketball player (born 1990)

- Moser with the Denver Nuggets

Denver Nuggets
- Title: Assistant coach
- League: NBA

Personal information
- Born: November 8, 1990 (age 36) Dallas, Texas, U.S.
- Listed height: 6 ft 8 in (2.03 m)
- Listed weight: 211 lb (96 kg)

Career information
- High school: Grant (Portland, Oregon)
- College: UCLA (2009–2010); UNLV (2011–2013); Oregon (2013–2014)
- NBA draft: 2014: undrafted
- Playing career: 2014–2019
- Position: Power forward
- Number: 43
- Coaching career: 2019–present

Career history

Playing
- 2014–2015: Lietuvos rytas
- 2015–2016: Hapoel Holon
- 2017: Sigal Prishtina
- 2017–2018: Al Sadd Doha
- 2018: Karhu Basket
- 2018–2019: JL Bourg

Coaching
- 2019–2021: Dallas Mavericks (assistant)
- 2021–2022: Oregon (women's assistant)
- 2022–2023: Boston Celtics (assistant)
- 2023–2025: Houston Rockets (assistant)
- 2025–present: Denver Nuggets (assistant)

Career highlights
- AP honorable mention All-American (2012); First-team All-MWC (2012); MWC All-Defensive Team (2012); MWC Newcomer of the Year (2012)

Michael Alexander Moser (pronounced MOH-zer; born November 8, 1990) is an American retired professional basketball player who currently serves as an assistant coach for the Denver Nuggets of the National Basketball Association (NBA). He played college basketball for the University of Oregon as a senior. Moser was an All-American player at the University of Nevada, Las Vegas (UNLV) before transferring to Oregon in 2013.

== High school and college career ==
Moser attended Grant High School in Portland, Oregon, where he led the school to a state title in 2008. He originally committed to Arizona, but backed out of his commitment once coach Lute Olson resigned, opting for UCLA.

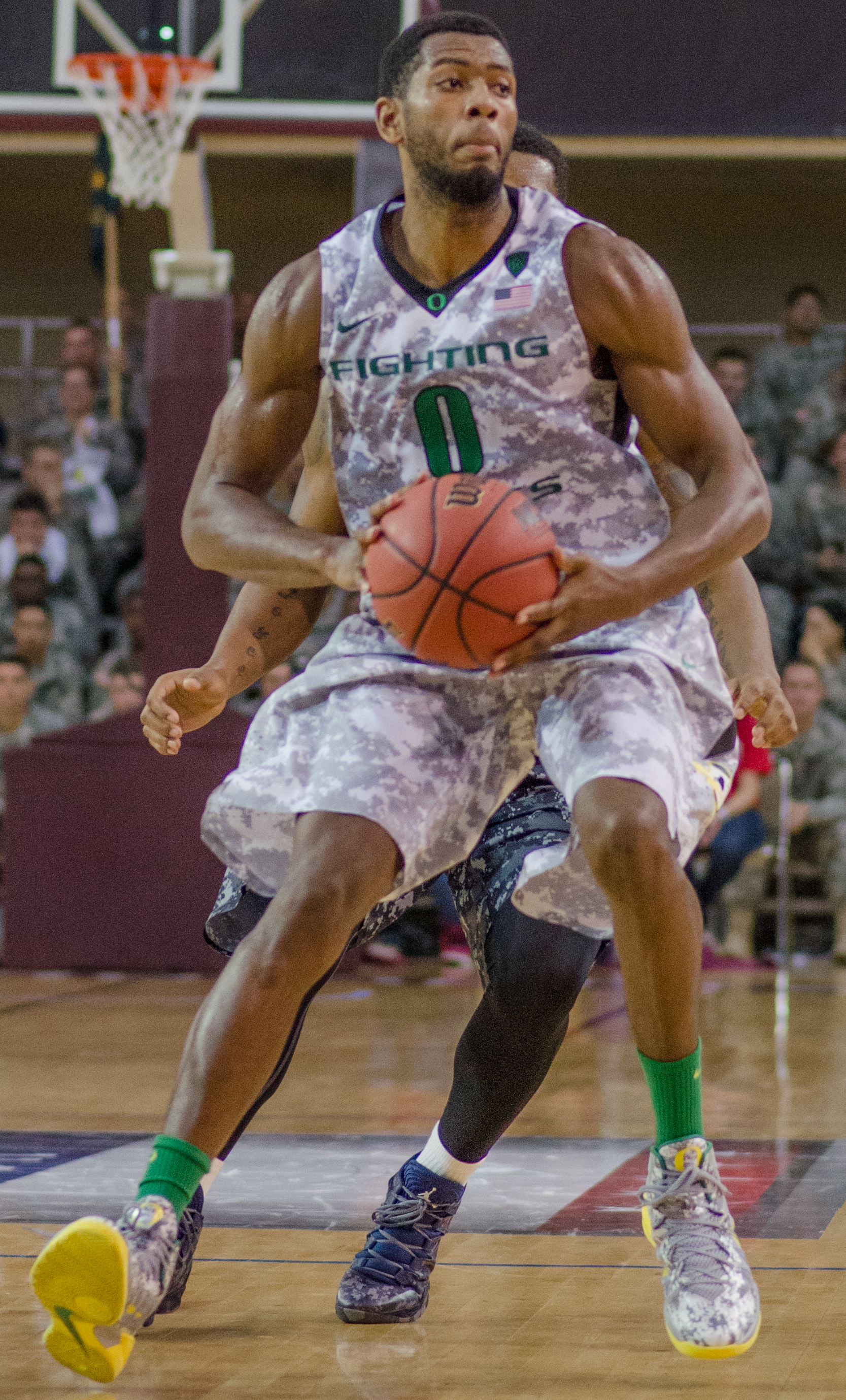
Moser with Oregon.

After getting minimal playing time and struggling with the Bruins' style, Moser decided to transfer. Moser landed at UNLV, where he enjoyed a strong sophomore season in 2011–12, averaging 14 points and 10.5 rebounds per game. Moser was named all-Mountain West Conference and an honorable mention All-American by the Associated Press. As a junior, Moser suffered a disappointing season as he battled a dislocated elbow suffered early in the season.

Moser graduated from UNLV at the end of the season and sought to transfer to another school for his last year of eligibility. He ultimately chose the University of Oregon under coach Dana Altman. As a senior in 2013–14, Moser played 34 games, averaging 13.2 points, 7.7 rebounds, 1.6 assists and 1.1 steals in 28.4 minutes per game, going on to earn All-Pac-12 Honorable Mention honors.

== Professional career ==
After going undrafted in the 2014 NBA draft, Moser joined the Boston Celtics for the 2014 NBA Summer League averaging 13.6 points, 4.8 rebounds, and 2 assists in 26.2 minutes per game. On September 1, 2014, he signed with Lietuvos rytas Vilnius of the Lithuanian Basketball League for the 2014–15 season.

On July 24, 2015, Moser signed with Hapoel Holon of the Israeli Basketball Premier League. Moser was originally supposed to join the Phoenix Suns on September 25, 2016, but couldn't do so due to a health issue he had around that time.

In June 2017 he obtained an Albanian passport and went on to play that year with the national team in World Cup pre-qualification.

On July 8, 2017, Moser signed with the Italian team Pallacanestro Reggiana for the 2017–18 season. On August 23, 2017, he parted ways with Reggiana. Moser did not pass the physical examinations.

On August 10, 2018, Moser signed with Karhu Basket from the Finnish Korisliiga.

On December 20, 2018, he signed with LNB Pro A team JL Bourg.

== Coaching career ==
=== Oregon Ducks women's basketball ===
Moser was hired as assistant coach by Oregon Ducks in 2021 after working with the Dallas Mavericks as player development and analytics from 2019 to 2021.

=== Boston Celtics ===
In July 2022, Moser was hired by the Boston Celtics as assistant coach-player enhancement staff.

=== Houston Rockets ===
On July 3, 2023, Moser was hired by the Houston Rockets as assistant coach.

=== Denver Nuggets ===
On August 15, 2025, the Denver Nuggets hired Moser to serve as an assistant coach under head coach David Adelman.

== Personal life ==
Moser married Olympic gymnast Tasha Schwikert in 2015. They have three children.
