= Pavel Marinov =

Bulgarian basketball player (born 1988)

No. 10 – BC Yambol
- Position: Small forward

Personal information
- Born: 12 June 1988 (age 38) Yambol, Bulgaria
- Listed height: 1.99 m (6 ft 6 in)

Career information
- Playing career: 2007–present

Career history
- 2007: Balkan Botevgrad
- 2007–2011: Yambol
- 2011–2013: Lukoil Academic
- 2013–2015: Balkan Botevgrad
- 2015–2016: Dinamo București
- 2016–2017: BCM U Pitesti
- 2017: Lille Métropole BC
- 2017–2018: Steaua
- 2018–2019: Caen
- 2019-21: Beroe
- 2021: Athletic Constanța
- 2022: Palmer Palma
- 2022–present: Yambol

Pavel Marinov (Bulgarian: Павел Маринов) (born 12 June 1988) is a Bulgarian professional basketball small forward who currently plays for Yambol in the Bulgarian NBL. He is also the captain of the Bulgarian national team.
