= Anton Gaddefors =

Swedish basketball player

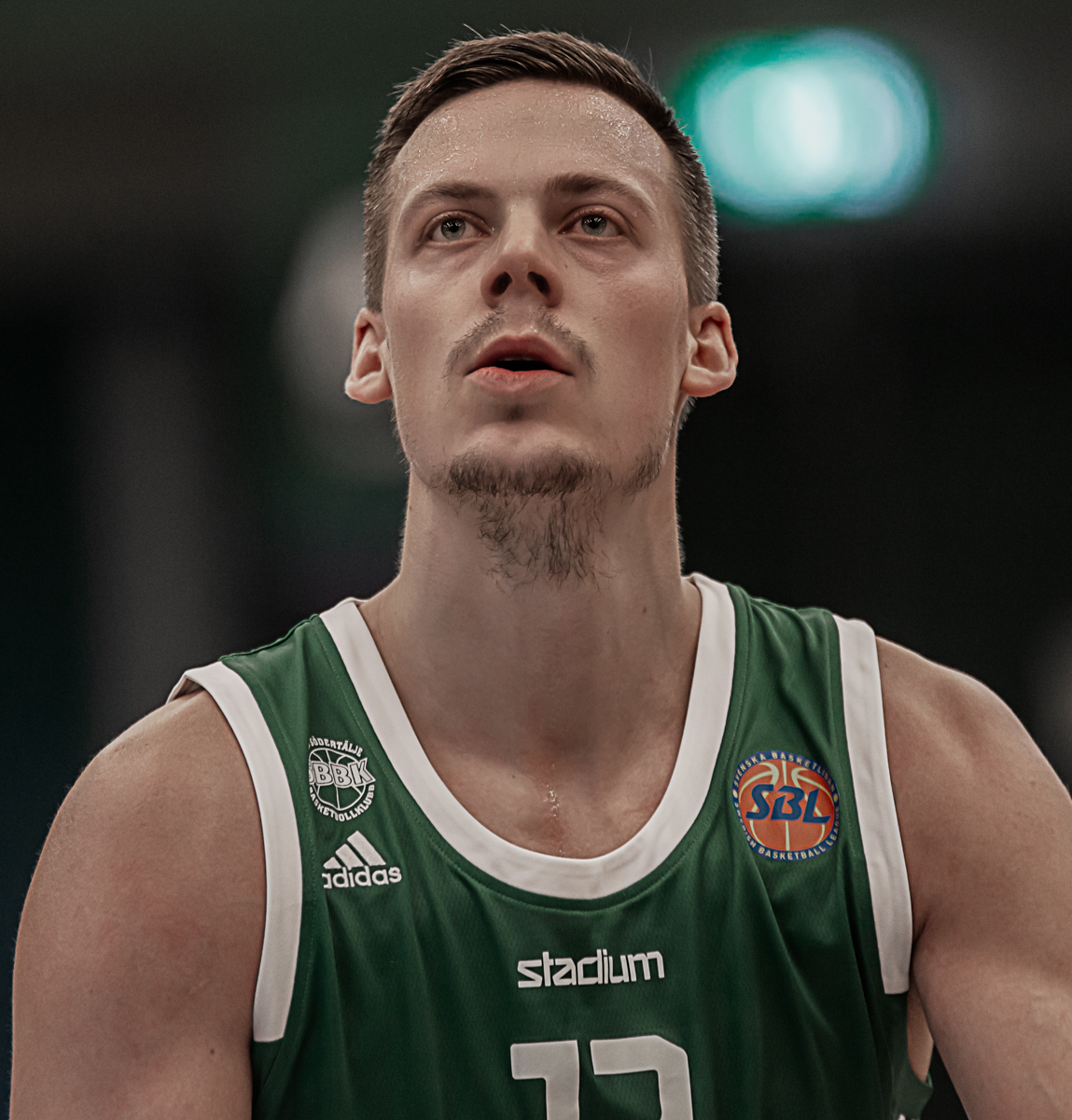
- Gaddefors with Södertälje in 2021

No. 12 – Södertälje BBK
- Position: Shooting guard / small forward
- League: Swedish Basketball League

Personal information
- Born: 4 November 1989 (age 37) Bromma, Sweden
- Listed height: 2.00 m (6 ft 7 in)
- Listed weight: 97 kg (214 lb)

Career information
- NBA draft: 2011: undrafted
- Playing career: 2006–present

Career history
- 2006–2010: Uppsala Basket
- 2010–2012: Radnički Kragujevac
- 2012: Okapi Aalstar
- 2012–2013: Sundsvall Dragons
- 2013–2014: Liège Basket
- 2014–2017: Uppsala Basket
- 2017–2018: Krosno
- 2018: Orlandina Basket
- 2019–present: Södertälje BBK

Anton Gaddefors (born 4 November 1989) is a Swedish professional basketball player who currently plays for Södertälje BBK.

His younger brother, Viktor Gaddefors, is also a basketball player. In December 2016, Anton Gaddefors made a comeback in Uppsala basketball.

== See also ==
- List of foreign basketball players in Serbia
