= Petr Bohačík =

Czech basketball player

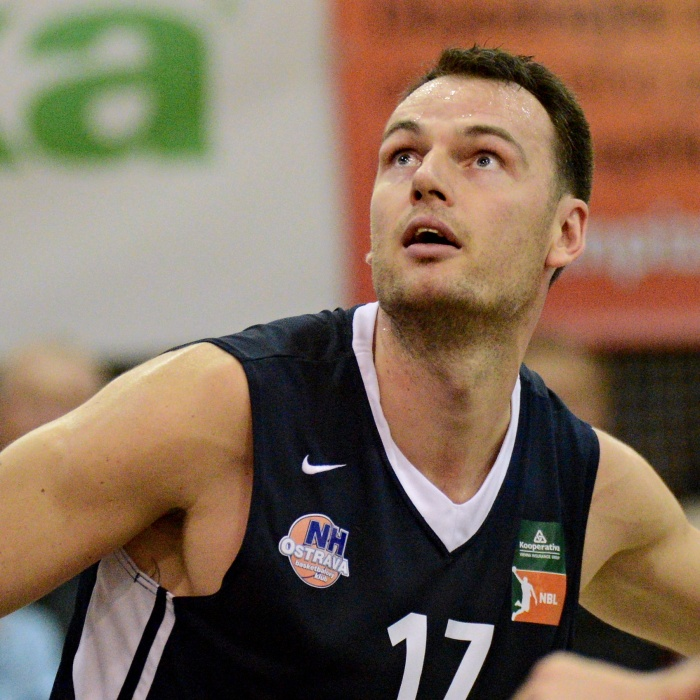
- Bohačík with Pardubice

No. 7 – JIP Pardubice
- Position: Forward
- League: NBL (Czech Republic)

Personal information
- Born: August 14, 1985 (age 41) Opava, Czechoslovakia
- Listed height: 6 ft 9 in (2.06 m)
- Listed weight: 231 lb (105 kg)

Career information
- Playing career: 2004–present

Career history
- 2004–2009: NH Ostrava
- 2009–present: Pardubice

Petr Bohačík is a professional Czech basketball player playing for BK JIP Pardubice. He was twice honoured to be part of All Star Game (2007 and 2011). He has been a member of the Czech Republic national basketball team, competing in the 2005 FIBA Europe Under-20 Championship, 2009 EuroBasket, and the 2011 EuroBasket.

Bohačík started the 2010–11 season strongly, scoring 88 points in his first 8 matches, including 19 points against Svitavy, and being singled out by Czech news agency iDNES.cz as star of the league. He went on to score 15 points for Pardubice in a 70–50 win over Děčín in March 2011. He finished the season being nominated for the All Star Game.
