= Charlon Kloof =

Dutch-Surinamese basketball player

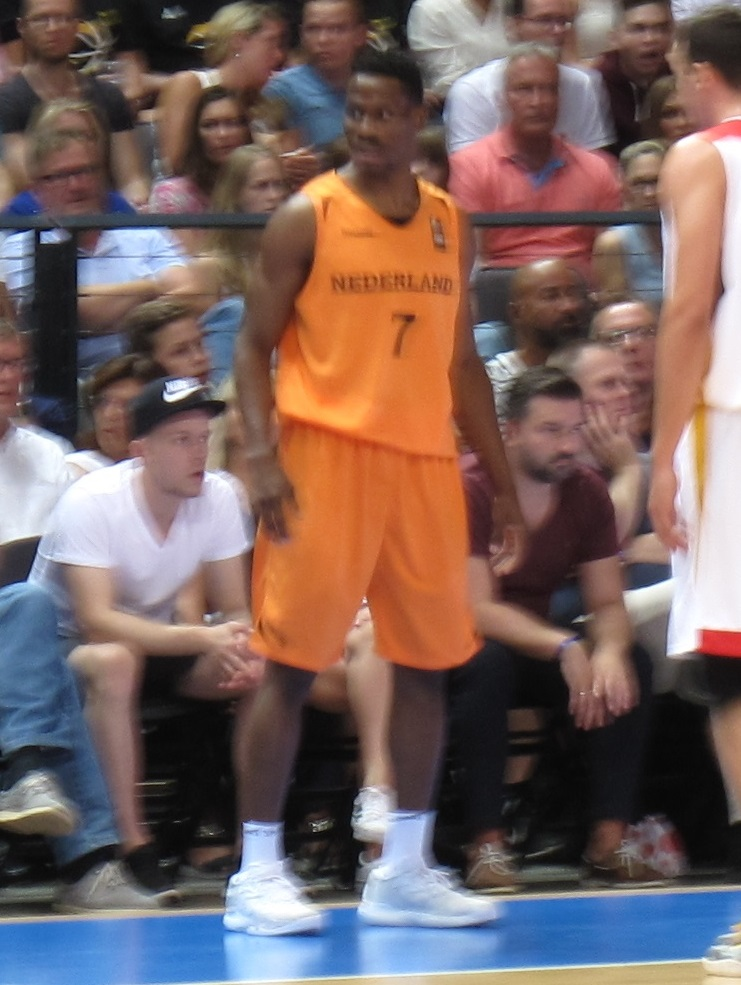
- Kloof playing for the Netherlands in 2016

No. 90 – Heroes Den Bosch
- Position: Point guard
- League: BNXT League

Personal information
- Born: 20 March 1990 (age 36) Paramaribo, Suriname
- Listed height: 6 ft 3 in (1.91 m)
- Listed weight: 194 lb (88 kg)

Career information
- High school: Canarias Basketball Academy
- College: Guilford Technical CC (2009–2010); St. Bonaventure (2011–2014)
- NBA draft: 2014: undrafted
- Playing career: 2014–present

Career history
- 2014–2015: İstanbul DSİ
- 2015–2016: Rethymno Cretan Kings
- 2016: Fiat Torino
- 2016–2017: MZT Skopje
- 2017–2019: UCAM Murcia
- 2019–2020: Ormanspor
- 2020: MoraBanc Andorra
- 2020: Fuenlabrada
- 2021: Ormanspor
- 2021–2024: FC Porto
- 2024–present: Heroes Den Bosch

Career highlights
- Dutch League champion (2025); Dutch Cup winner (2025); Dutch Supercup champion (2025); Macedonian League champion (2017); Macedonian League MVP (2017); Portuguese Cup winner (2024)

Charlon Anduele Romano Kloof (born 20 March 1990) is a Dutch-Surinamese basketball player for Heroes Den Bosch of the BNXT League. Standing at 6 ft 3 in (1.91 m), Kloof plays the point guard position and is a current member of the Dutch national basketball team.

== Professional career ==
=== İstanbul DSİ ===
Kloof's professional career started in the 2014–15 season in the Turkish TB2L with İstanbul DSİ. He was the leading scorer of his team, with 19.8 points per game.

=== Rethymno Cretan Kings ===
He started the 2015–16 season with Rethymno Cretan Kings of the Greek Basket League, but in January he moved to Italy, where he signed for Auxilium CUS Torino of the Lega Basket Serie A.

=== MZT Skopje ===
On 23 July 2016, Kloof signed with MZT Skopje. He led Skopje to a First League championship, and was named the league's Most Valuable Player afterwards.

=== Murcia ===
On 19 July 2017, Kloof signed with UCAM Murcia of the Spanish Liga ACB and the Basketball Champions League (BCL). Kloof became the first Surinamese player to play in the Liga ACB. In the 2017–18 BCL season, Murcia reached the tournament's Final Four. Murcia finished as third after defeating Riesen Ludwigsburg in the third-place game.

=== Ormanspor ===
In July 2019, Kloof agreed on a contract with Turkish club OGM Ormanspor, newcomer in the Basketbol Süper Ligi (BSL). He averaged 9.6 points and 4.2 rebounds per game.

=== Andorra ===
On September 9, 2020, Kloof signed a two-month deal with MoraBanc Andorra of the Liga ACB. In five games, he averaged 3.0 points, 1.0 rebound and 1.0 assist per game.

=== Fuenlabrada ===
On October 29, 2020, Kloof signed with Fuenlabrada.

=== Return to Ormanspor ===
On January 2, 2021, he has signed again with Ormanspor of the Turkish Basketbol Süper Ligi (BSL).

=== Porto ===
On August 17, 2021, he has signed with FC Porto in the Portuguese Basketball League.

=== Heroes Den Bosch ===
On November 12, 2024, he signed with Heroes Den Bosch of the BNXT League. He won the 2025 Dutch Cup with Heroes.

== International career ==
After playing for the junior teams of the Netherlands, Kloof was selected for the Dutch national basketball team for EuroBasket 2015. In his EuroBasket debut, he scored 22 points in a 73–72 win over Georgia. Kloof averaged 16.2 points, 4.6 rebounds and 3.2 assists per game at EuroBasket 2015 as his country was eliminated in the group stage.

=== Statistics ===
Year	Team	GP	GS	MPG	FG%	3P%	FT%	RPG	APG	SPG	BPG	PPG
2015 EuroBasket	Netherlands	5	5	29.0	.451	.611	.632	4.6	3.2	1.0	.2	16.2
