= Mārtiņš Meiers =

Latvian basketball player

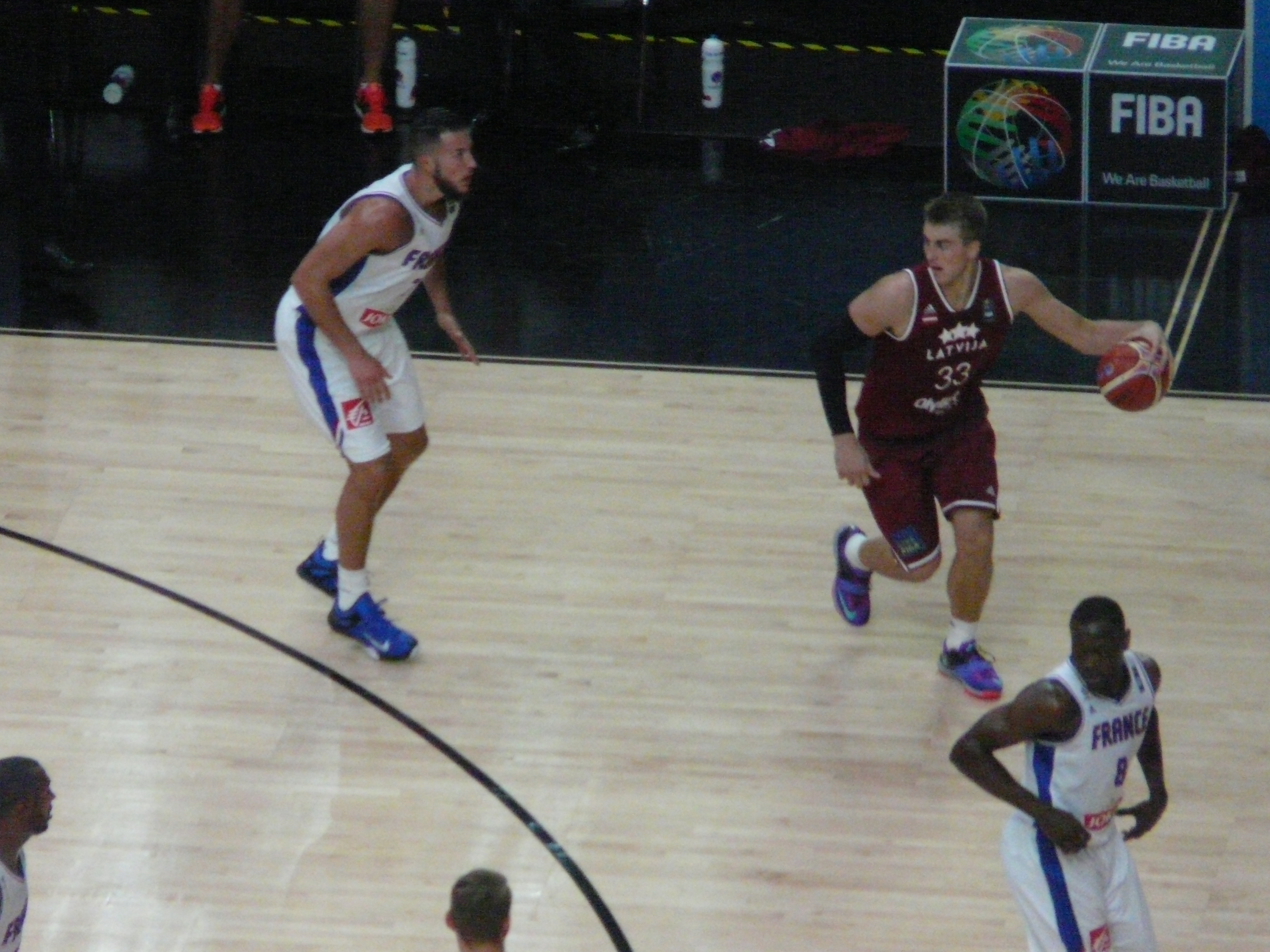
- Meiers (controlling the ball) at the EuroBasket 2015

Ungmennafélagið Sindri
- Position: Center
- League: Úrvalsdeild karla

Personal information
- Born: 30 March 1991 (age 35) Jūrmala, Latvia SSR, Soviet Union
- Listed height: 2.08 m (6 ft 10 in)
- Listed weight: 108 kg (238 lb)

Career information
- NBA draft: 2013: undrafted
- Playing career: 2009–present

Career history
- 2009–2010: BK Ventspils
- 2010–2011: BK Liepājas Lauvas
- 2011–2013: BK Ventspils
- 2013–2014: Mitteldeutscher BC
- 2014–2015: BK Ventspils
- 2015–2017: VEF Rīga
- 2017: UNICS
- 2017–2019: Enisey
- 2019–2020: Budućnost
- 2020–2021: BC Astana
- 2021: Élan Chalon
- 2021–2022: Śląsk Wrocław
- 2022–2023: BC Kalev
- 2023–2024: Okapi Aalst
- 2024: Rīgas Zeļļi
- 2024: BK Saldus
- 2024–2025: BC Kalev
- 2025: TalTech
- 2025–2026: BC Gargždai
- 2026–present: Ungmennafélagið Sindri

Career highlights
- Estonian Cup winner (2025); Estonian League champion (2023); PLK champion (2022); Latvian League champion (2017); 3× LBL All-Star (2012, 2016, 2017)

Mārtiņš Meiers (born 30 March 1991) is a Latvian professional basketball player for Ungmennafélagið Sindri of the Icelandic Úrvalsdeild karla.

== Professional career ==
Meiers had a breakout year in his second season with VEF Rīga averaging 13.7ppg in the VTB United League. On 5 February 2017 Meiers had a 31-point performance against Zenit.

Meiers spent the 2019–20 season with Budućnost VOLI of the ABA League. He signed with BC Astana on 1 September 2020.

On 16 February 2021 he signed with Élan Chalon of the LNB Pro A.

On 10 November 2021 he signed with Śląsk Wrocław of the Polish Basketball League.

On 3 December 2025, Meiers signed with BC Gargždai of the Lithuanian Basketball League (LKL).

== National team career ==
Meiers has represented the Latvian national team in EuroBasket 2011, EuroBasket 2013, EuroBasket 2015 and EuroBasket 2017.
