= Franko Bushati =

Albanian basketball player (born 1985)

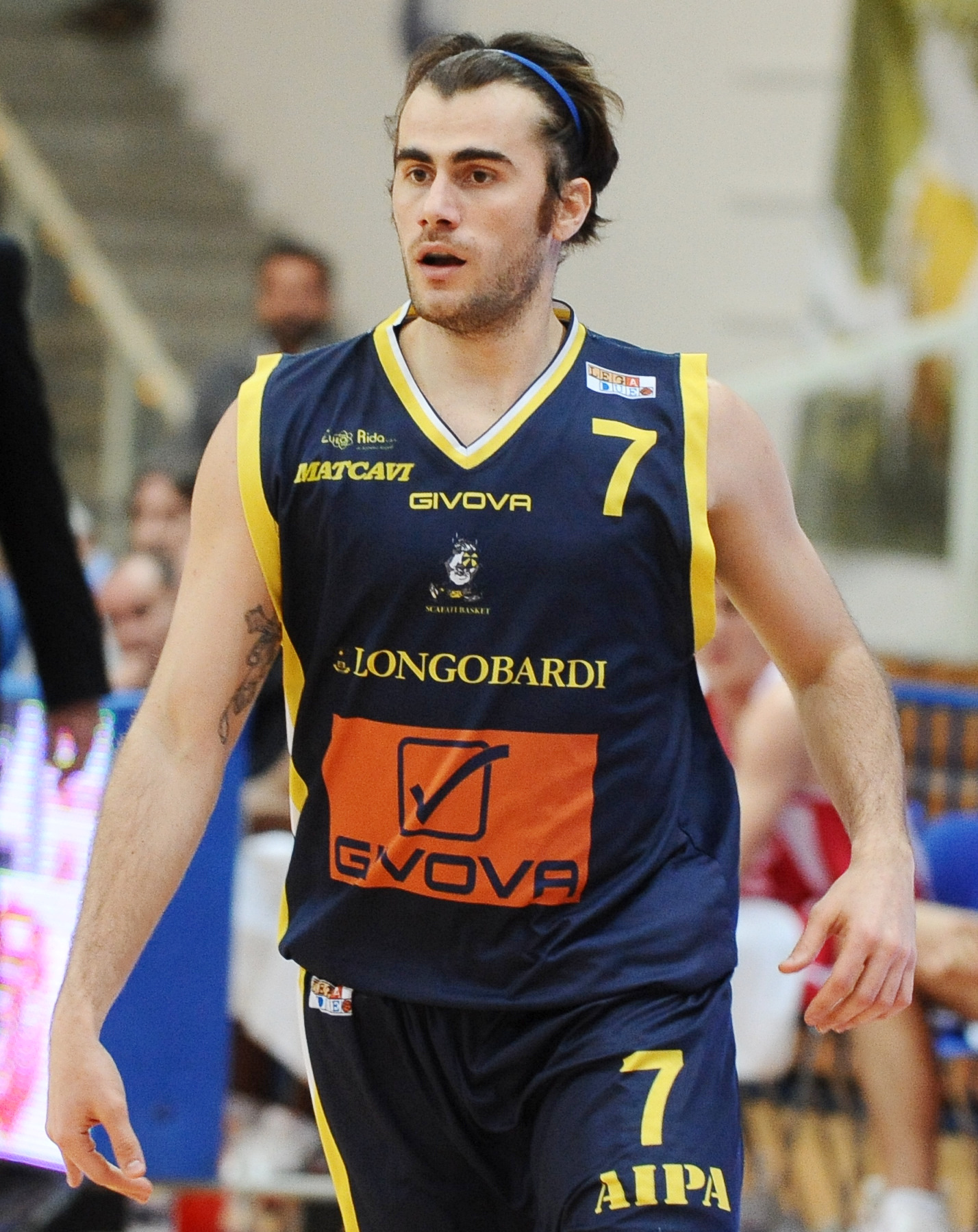
- Bushati in 2013

Personal information
- Born: 5 July 1985 (age 40) Tirana, Albania
- Listed height: 6 ft 3 in (1.91 m)

Career information
- NBA draft: 2007: undrafted
- Playing career: 2004–2023
- Position: Shooting guard

Career history
- 2007–2009: Dinamo Sassari
- 2009: Veroli
- 2009–2010: Andrea Costa Imola
- 2010–2012: Basket Brescia Leonessa
- 2012–2013: Scafati
- 2013–2014: Basket Brescia Leonessa
- 2014–2015: Andrea Costa Imola
- 2015–2017: Basket Brescia Leonessa
- 2018–2020: G.S.A. Udine
- 2020–2021: Basket Torino
- 2021–2022: Fulgur Omegna
- 2022–2023: Firenze

Franko Bushati (born 5 July 1985) is an Albanian former professional basketball player who played for several clubs in Italy. Bushati was also part of the Albanian national team. He is currently the general secretary of the Albanian Basketball Federation.

== Career ==
He signed with Basket Torino in January 2020.
