= Basketball at the 2020 Summer Olympics – Men's team rosters =

This article shows the rosters of all participating teams at the men's basketball tournament at the 2020 Summer Olympics in Tokyo.

== Group A ==
=== Czech Republic ===
The roster was announced on 8 July 2021.

Czech Republic men's national basketball team roster
Players
Coaches

Pos.	No.	Name	Age – Date of birth	Height	Club	Ctr.
PF	1	Patrik Auda	31 – 29 August 1989	2.06 m (6 ft 9 in)	Yokohama B-Corsairs	(Japan)
PG	4	Tomáš Vyoral	28 – 28 September 1992	1.90 m (6 ft 3 in)	Pardubice	(Czech Republic)
PG	8	Tomáš Satoranský	29 – 30 October 1991	2.01 m (6 ft 7 in)	Chicago Bulls	(United States)
F	11	Blake Schilb	37 – 23 December 1983	1.99 m (6 ft 6 in)	USK Praha	(Czech Republic)
C	12	Ondřej Balvín	28 – 20 September 1992	2.17 m (7 ft 1 in)	Bilbao	(Spain)
PG	13	Jakub Šiřina	33 – 21 November 1987	1.86 m (6 ft 1 in)	Opava	(Czech Republic)
PF	15	Martin Peterka	26 – 12 January 1995	2.03 m (6 ft 8 in)	Braunschweig	(Germany)
F	17	Jaromír Bohačík	29 – 26 May 1992	1.97 m (6 ft 6 in)	Strasbourg	(France)
PG	19	Ondřej Sehnal	23 – 10 October 1997	1.90 m (6 ft 3 in)	Praha	(Czech Republic)
SF	23	Lukáš Palyza	31 – 10 November 1989	2.03 m (6 ft 8 in)	Nymburk	(Czech Republic)
C	24	Jan Veselý	31 – 24 April 1990	2.13 m (7 ft 0 in)	Fenerbahçe	(Turkey)
SG	25	David Jelínek	30 – 7 September 1990	1.97 m (6 ft 6 in)	Andorra	(Spain)

Head coach

- (Israel) Ronen Ginzburg

Assistant coach(es)

- (Czech Republic) Petr Czudek
- (Czech Republic) Jan Pospíšil

Legend

- Club – describes last
  club before the competition
- Age – describes age
  on 25 July 2021

=== France ===
The roster was announced on 21 May 2021.

France men's national basketball team roster
Players
Coaches

Pos.	No.	Name	Age – Date of birth	Height	Club	Ctr.
PG	1	Frank Ntilikina	22 – 28 July 1998	1.98 m (6 ft 6 in)	New York Knicks	(United States)
G	3	Timothé Luwawu-Cabarrot	26 – 9 May 1995	1.98 m (6 ft 6 in)	Brooklyn Nets	(United States)
PG	4	Thomas Heurtel	32 – 10 April 1989	1.88 m (6 ft 2 in)	ASVEL Basket	(France)
SF	5	Nicolas Batum	32 – 14 December 1988	2.03 m (6 ft 8 in)	Los Angeles Clippers	(United States)
PF	7	Guerschon Yabusele	25 – 17 December 1995	2.03 m (6 ft 8 in)	ASVEL Basket	(France)
SG	10	Evan Fournier	28 – 29 October 1992	1.99 m (6 ft 6 in)	Boston Celtics	(United States)
SG	12	Nando de Colo	34 – 23 June 1987	1.96 m (6 ft 5 in)	Fenerbahçe	(Turkey)
C	17	Vincent Poirier	27 – 17 October 1993	2.13 m (7 ft 0 in)	Real Madrid	(Spain)
PG	21	Andrew Albicy	31 – 21 March 1990	1.78 m (5 ft 10 in)	CB Gran Canaria	(Spain)
C	27	Rudy Gobert	29 – 26 June 1992	2.15 m (7 ft 1 in)	Utah Jazz	(United States)
C	28	Petr Cornelie	25 – 26 July 1995	2.11 m (6 ft 11 in)	Pau-Lacq-Orthez	(France)
C	93	Moustapha Fall	29 – 23 February 1992	2.18 m (7 ft 2 in)	ASVEL Basket	(France)

Head coach

- (France) Vincent Collet

Assistant coach(es)

- (France) Pascal Donnadieu
- (France) Ruddy Nelhomme

Legend

- (C) Team captain
- Club – describes last
  club before the competition
- Age – describes age
  on 25 July 2021

=== Iran ===
The roster was announced on 3 July 2021.

Iran men's national basketball team roster
Players
Coaches

Pos.	No.	Name	Age – Date of birth	Height	Club	Ctr.
G	3	Sina Vahedi	20 – 8 January 2001	1.91 m (6 ft 3 in)	Shahrdari Gorgan	(Iran)
PG	5	Philip Jalalpoor	28 – 14 June 1993	1.85 m (6 ft 1 in)	Medi Bayreuth	(Germany)
PF	7	Mohammad Hassanzadeh	30 – 6 October 1990	2.01 m (6 ft 7 in)	Palayesh Naft Abadan	(Iran)
SF	8	Saeid Davarpanah	33 – 7 September 1987	1.90 m (6 ft 3 in)	Palayesh Naft Abadan	(Iran)
G	13	Mohammad Jamshidi	29 – 30 July 1991	1.99 m (6 ft 6 in)	Shahrdari Gorgan	(Iran)
SF	14	Samad Nikkhah Bahrami (C)	38 – 11 May 1983	1.98 m (6 ft 6 in)	Mahram Tehran	(Iran)
C	15	Hamed Haddadi	36 – 19 May 1985	2.18 m (7 ft 2 in)	Sichuan Blue Whales	(China)
SG	17	Navid Rezaeifar	24 – 23 August 1996	1.91 m (6 ft 3 in)	Shahrdari Gorgan	(Iran)
PF	20	Mike Rostampour	29 – 20 December 1991	2.10 m (6 ft 11 in)	Shahrdari Gorgan	(Iran)
C	23	Aaron Geramipoor	28 – 11 September 1992	2.14 m (7 ft 0 in)	Manchester Giants	(United Kingdom)
PF	41	Arsalan Kazemi	31 – 22 April 1990	2.01 m (6 ft 7 in)	Chemidor Qom	(Iran)
G	88	Behnam Yakhchali	26 – 12 July 1995	1.91 m (6 ft 3 in)	Rostock Seawolves	(Germany)

Head coach

- (Iran) Mehran Shahintab

Assistant coach(es)

- (Iran) Mehrad Atashi
- (Iran) Farzad Kouhian

Legend

- Club – describes last
  club before the tournament
- Age – describes age
  on 25 July 2021

=== United States ===
The roster was updated on July 16, 2021.

United States men's national basketball team – 2020 Summer Olympics roster
Players
Coaches

Pos.	No.	Name	Age – Date of birth	Height	Club	Ctr.
C	13	Bam Adebayo	24 – July 18, 1997	6 ft 9 in (2.06 m)	Miami Heat	(United States)
G	15	Devin Booker	24 – October 30, 1996	6 ft 5 in (1.96 m)	Phoenix Suns	(United States)
F	7	Kevin Durant	32 – September 29, 1988	6 ft 10 in (2.08 m)	Brooklyn Nets	(United States)
F	9	Jerami Grant	27 – March 12, 1994	6 ft 8 in (2.03 m)	Detroit Pistons	(United States)
F	14	Draymond Green	31 – March 4, 1990	6 ft 6 in (1.98 m)	Golden State Warriors	(United States)
G	12	Jrue Holiday	31 – June 12, 1990	6 ft 3 in (1.91 m)	Milwaukee Bucks	(United States)
F	4	Keldon Johnson	21 – October 11, 1999	6 ft 5 in (1.96 m)	San Antonio Spurs	(United States)
G	5	Zach LaVine	26 – March 10, 1995	6 ft 5 in (1.96 m)	Chicago Bulls	(United States)
G	6	Damian Lillard	31 – July 15, 1990	6 ft 2 in (1.88 m)	Portland Trail Blazers	(United States)
C	11	JaVale McGee	33 – January 19, 1988	7 ft 0 in (2.13 m)	Denver Nuggets	(United States)
F	8	Khris Middleton	29 – August 12, 1991	6 ft 7 in (2.01 m)	Milwaukee Bucks	(United States)
F	10	Jayson Tatum	23 – March 3, 1998	6 ft 8 in (2.03 m)	Boston Celtics	(United States)

Head coach

- (United States) Gregg Popovich

Assistant coach(es)

- (United States) Steve Kerr
- (United States) Lloyd Pierce
- (United States) Jay Wright
- (Nigeria) Ime Udoka

Legend

- Club – describes last
  club before the tournament
- Age – describes age
  on July 25, 2021

Roster

== Group B ==
=== Australia ===
The roster was announced on 2 July 2021.

Australia men's national basketball team – 2020 Tokyo Olympics roster
Players
Coaches

Pos.	No.	Name	Age – Date of birth	Height	Club	Ctr.
SG	4	Chris Goulding	32 – 24 October 1988	1.92 m (6 ft 4 in)	Melbourne United	(Australia)
G	5	Patty Mills	32 – 11 August 1988	1.83 m (6 ft 0 in)	San Antonio Spurs	(United States)
SG	6	Josh Green	20 – 26 November 2000	1.98 m (6 ft 6 in)	Dallas Mavericks	(United States)
SF	7	Joe Ingles	33 – 2 October 1987	2.04 m (6 ft 8 in)	Utah Jazz	(United States)
PG	8	Matthew Dellavedova	30 – 8 September 1990	1.91 m (6 ft 3 in)	Melbourne United	(Australia)
G	9	Nathan Sobey	31 – 14 July 1990	1.90 m (6 ft 3 in)	Brisbane Bullets	(Australia)
G/F	10	Matisse Thybulle	24 – 4 March 1997	1.96 m (6 ft 5 in)	Philadelphia 76ers	(United States)
G	11	Dante Exum	26 – 13 July 1995	1.93 m (6 ft 4 in)	Houston Rockets	(United States)
C	12	Aron Baynes	34 – 9 December 1986	2.07 m (6 ft 9 in)	Toronto Raptors	(Canada)
F/C	13	Jock Landale	25 – 25 October 1995	2.11 m (6 ft 11 in)	Melbourne United	(Australia)
F/C	14	Duop Reath	25 – 26 June 1996	2.11 m (6 ft 11 in)	Crvena Zvezda	(Serbia)
PF	15	Nick Kay	28 – 3 August 1992	2.06 m (6 ft 9 in)	Real Betis	(Spain)

Head coach

- (United States) Brian Goorjian

Assistant coach(es)

- (Australia) Matthew Nielsen
- (Australia) Adam Caporn
- (Australia) John Rillie

Legend

- Club – describes last
  club before the tournament
- Age – describes age
  on 25 July 2021

=== Germany ===
The roster was announced on 5 July 2021.

Germany national basketball team – 2020 Summer Olympics roster
Players
Coaches

Pos.	No.	Name	Age – Date of birth	Height	Club	Ctr.
PG	0	Isaac Bonga	21 – 8 November 1999	2.03 m (6 ft 8 in)	Washington Wizards	(United States)
SG	1	Joshiko Saibou	31 – 7 March 1990	1.88 m (6 ft 2 in)	Champagne Châlons-Reims	(France)
PG	4	Maodo Lô	28 – 31 December 1992	1.92 m (6 ft 4 in)	Alba Berlin	(Germany)
SF	5	Niels Giffey	30 – 8 June 1991	2.00 m (6 ft 7 in)	Žalgiris	(Lithuania)
F	6	Jan Niklas Wimberg	25 – 11 February 1996	2.06 m (6 ft 9 in)	Niners Chemnitz	(Germany)
C	7	Johannes Voigtmann	28 – 30 September 1992	2.09 m (6 ft 10 in)	CSKA Moscow	(Russia)
F	12	Robin Benzing	32 – 25 January 1989	2.10 m (6 ft 11 in)	Basket Zaragoza	(Spain)
PF	13	Moritz Wagner	24 – 26 April 1997	2.11 m (6 ft 11 in)	Orlando Magic	(United States)
SF	19	Lukas Wank	24 – 19 January 1997	1.99 m (6 ft 6 in)	Löwen Braunschweig	(Germany)
PF	22	Danilo Barthel	29 – 24 October 1991	2.07 m (6 ft 9 in)	Fenerbahçe	(Turkey)
PF	32	Johannes Thiemann	27 – 9 February 1994	2.05 m (6 ft 9 in)	Alba Berlin	(Germany)
SG	42	Andreas Obst	25 – 13 July 1996	1.91 m (6 ft 3 in)	ratiopharm Ulm	(Germany)

Head coach

- (Germany) Henrik Rödl

Assistant coach(es)

- (Australia) Alan Ibrahimagic
- (Canada) Roy Rana

Legend

- Club – describes last
  club before the tournament
- Age – describes age
  on 25 July 2021

=== Italy ===
The roster was announced on 6 July 2021.

Italy national basketball team roster
Players
Coaches

Pos.	No.	Name	Age – Date of birth	Height	Club	Ctr.
PG	0	Marco Spissu	26 – 5 February 1995	1.84 m (6 ft 0 in)	Dinamo Sassari	(Italy)
G	1	Nico Mannion	20 – 14 March 2001	1.90 m (6 ft 3 in)	Golden State Warriors	(United States)
G	7	Stefano Tonut	27 – 7 November 1993	1.94 m (6 ft 4 in)	Reyer Venezia	(Italy)
PF	8	Danilo Gallinari	32 – 8 August 1988	2.08 m (6 ft 10 in)	Atlanta Hawks	(United States)
PF	9	Nicolò Melli (C)	30 – 26 January 1991	2.05 m (6 ft 9 in)	Dallas Mavericks	(United States)
F	13	Simone Fontecchio	25 – 9 December 1995	2.03 m (6 ft 8 in)	Alba Berlin	(Germany)
C	16	Amedeo Tessitori	26 – 7 October 1994	2.08 m (6 ft 10 in)	Virtus Bologna	(Italy)
PF	17	Giampaolo Ricci	29 – 27 September 1991	2.01 m (6 ft 7 in)	Virtus Bologna	(Italy)
G	24	Riccardo Moraschini	30 – 8 January 1991	1.93 m (6 ft 4 in)	Olimpia Milano	(Italy)
SF	31	Michele Vitali	29 – 31 October 1991	1.96 m (6 ft 5 in)	Brose Bamberg	(Germany)
F	33	Achille Polonara	29 – 23 November 1991	2.05 m (6 ft 9 in)	Saski Baskonia	(Spain)
PG	54	Alessandro Pajola	21 – 9 November 1999	1.94 m (6 ft 4 in)	Virtus Bologna	(Italy)

Head coach

- (Italy) Meo Sacchetti

Assistant coach(es)

- (Italy) Piero Bucchi
- (Italy) Riccardo Fois
- (Italy) Paolo Galbiati
- (Italy) Emanuele Molin

Legend

- Club – describes last
  club before the competition
- Age – describes age
  on 25 July 2021

=== Nigeria ===
A 15-player roster was announced on 6 July 2021. The final squad was released on 20 July 2021.

Nigeria national basketball team roster
Players
Coaches

Pos.	No.	Name	Age – Date of birth	Height	Club	Ctr.
F	0	KZ Okpala	22 – 28 April 1999	2.03 m (6 ft 8 in)	Miami Heat	(United States)
G	3	Caleb Agada	26 – 31 August 1994	1.91 m (6 ft 3 in)	Hapoel Be'er Sheva	(Israel)
PF	8	Ekpe Udoh	34 – 20 May 1987	2.08 m (6 ft 10 in)	Virtus Bologna	(Italy)
F	10	Chimezie Metu	24 – 22 March 1997	2.11 m (6 ft 11 in)	Sacramento Kings	(United States)
SG	11	Obi Emegano	28 – 29 April 1993	1.89 m (6 ft 2 in)	Fuenlabrada	(Spain)
G	13	Miye Oni	23 – 4 August 1997	1.96 m (6 ft 5 in)	Utah Jazz	(United States)
C	15	Jahlil Okafor	25 – 15 December 1995	2.08 m (6 ft 10 in)	Detroit Pistons	(United States)
G	20	Josh Okogie	22 – 1 September 1998	1.93 m (6 ft 4 in)	Minnesota Timberwolves	(United States)
G	22	Gabe Vincent	25 – 14 June 1996	1.90 m (6 ft 3 in)	Miami Heat	(United States)
F	33	Jordan Nwora	22 – 9 September 1998	2.03 m (6 ft 8 in)	Milwaukee Bucks	(United States)
G	34	Ike Nwamu	28 – 3 June 1993	1.96 m (6 ft 5 in)	Samara	(Russia)
PF	55	Precious Achiuwa	21 – 19 September 1999	2.03 m (6 ft 8 in)	Miami Heat	(United States)

Head coach

- (United States) Mike Brown

Assistant coach(es)

- (Spain) Jordi Fernández
- (Nigeria) Alexander Nwora

Legend

- Club – describes last
  club before the tournament
- Age – describes age
  on 25 July 2021

== Group C ==
=== Argentina ===
A 15-player roster was announced on 4 June 2021. The final squad was revealed on 18 July 2021.

Argentina men's basketball team roster
Players
Coaches

Pos.	No.	Name	Age – Date of birth	Height	Club	Ctr.
PF	4	Luis Scola	41 – 30 April 1980	2.04 m (6 ft 8 in)	Pallacanestro Varese	(Italy)
PG	7	Facundo Campazzo	30 – 23 March 1991	1.79 m (5 ft 10 in)	Denver Nuggets	(United States)
PG	8	Nicolás Laprovíttola	31 – 31 January 1990	1.94 m (6 ft 4 in)	Real Madrid	(Spain)
SF	9	Nicolás Brussino	28 – 2 March 1993	2.00 m (6 ft 7 in)	Basket Zaragoza	(Spain)
SG	10	Leandro Bolmaro	20 – 11 September 2000	1.98 m (6 ft 6 in)	FC Barcelona	(Spain)
C	11	Francisco Cáffaro	21 – 19 May 2000	2.07 m (6 ft 9 in)	Virginia Cavaliers	(United States)
C	12	Marcos Delía	29 – 8 April 1992	2.06 m (6 ft 9 in)	Pallacanestro Trieste	(Italy)
SF	14	Gabriel Deck	26 – 8 February 1995	1.98 m (6 ft 6 in)	Oklahoma City Thunder	(United States)
PG	17	Luca Vildoza	25 – 11 August 1995	1.91 m (6 ft 3 in)	New York Knicks	(United States)
SF	22	Juan Pablo Vaulet	25 – 22 March 1996	1.98 m (6 ft 6 in)	Manresa	(Spain)
SF	29	Patricio Garino	28 – 17 May 1993	1.96 m (6 ft 5 in)	BC Žalgiris	(Lithuania)
C	83	Tayavek Gallizzi	28 – 8 February 1993	2.05 m (6 ft 9 in)	Regatas Corrientes	(Argentina)

Head coach

- (Argentina) Sergio Hernández

Assistant coach(es)

- (Argentina) Gabriel Piccato
- (Argentina) Silvio Santander

Legend

- (C) Team captain
- Club – describes current club
- Age – describes age
  on 25 July 2021

=== Japan ===
The roster was announced on 5 July 2021.

Japan national basketball team roster
Players
Coaches

Pos.	No.	Name	Age – Date of birth	Height	Club	Ctr.
PG	2	Yuki Togashi	27 – 30 July 1993	1.67 m (5 ft 6 in)	Chiba Jets Funabashi	(Japan)
SG	6	Makoto Hiejima	31 – 11 April 1990	1.91 m (6 ft 3 in)	Utsunomiya Brex	(Japan)
SF	8	Rui Hachimura	23 – 8 February 1998	2.03 m (6 ft 8 in)	Washington Wizards	(United States)
PG	9	Leo Vendrame	27 – 14 November 1993	1.86 m (6 ft 1 in)	Sun Rockers Shibuya	(Japan)
SF	12	Yuta Watanabe	24 – 13 October 1996	2.06 m (6 ft 9 in)	Toronto Raptors	(Canada)
SG	14	Kosuke Kanamaru	32 – 8 March 1989	1.92 m (6 ft 4 in)	Shimane Susanoo Magic	(Japan)
SF	18	Yudai Baba	25 – 7 November 1995	1.98 m (6 ft 6 in)	Melbourne United	(Australia)
PF	23	Gavin Edwards	33 – 15 January 1988	2.06 m (6 ft 9 in)	Chiba Jets Funabashi	(Japan)
SG	24	Daiki Tanaka	29 – 3 September 1991	1.92 m (6 ft 4 in)	Alvark Tokyo	(Japan)
C	32	Avi Schafer	23 – 28 January 1998	2.06 m (6 ft 9 in)	SeaHorses Mikawa	(Japan)
PF	34	Hugh Watanabe	22 – 23 December 1998	2.07 m (6 ft 9 in)	Ryukyu Golden Kings	(Japan)
SF	88	Tenketsu Harimoto	29 – 8 January 1992	1.98 m (6 ft 6 in)	Nagoya Diamond Dolphins	(Japan)

Head coach

- (Argentina) Julio Lamas

Assistant coach(es)

- (Argentina) Herman Mandole

Legend

- Club – describes last
  club before the tournament
- Age – describes age
  on 25 July 2021

=== Slovenia ===
The roster was announced on 17 July 2021.

Slovenia national basketball team roster
Players
Coaches

Pos.	No.	Name	Age – Date of birth	Height	Club	Ctr.
PG	5	Luka Rupnik	28 – 20 May 1993	1.86 m (6 ft 1 in)	Cedevita Olimpija	(Slovenia)
PG	6	Aleksej Nikolić	26 – 21 February 1995	1.91 m (6 ft 3 in)	BCM Gravelines-Dunkerque	(France)
SG	7	Klemen Prepelič	28 – 20 October 1992	1.89 m (6 ft 2 in)	Valencia	(Spain)
SF	8	Edo Murić (C)	29 – 27 November 1991	2.02 m (6 ft 8 in)	Cedevita Olimpija	(Slovenia)
C	10	Mike Tobey	26 – 10 October 1994	2.13 m (7 ft 0 in)	Valencia	(Spain)
SG	11	Jaka Blažič	31 – 30 June 1990	1.96 m (6 ft 5 in)	Cedevita Olimpija	(Slovenia)
SF	15	Gregor Hrovat	26 – 18 August 1994	1.96 m (6 ft 5 in)	Cholet Basket	(France)
C	27	Žiga Dimec	28 – 20 February 1993	2.11 m (6 ft 11 in)	Cedevita Olimpija	(Slovenia)
SF	30	Zoran Dragić	32 – 22 June 1989	1.96 m (6 ft 5 in)	Baskonia	(Spain)
SF	31	Vlatko Čančar	24 – 10 April 1997	2.03 m (6 ft 8 in)	Denver Nuggets	(United States)
SF	55	Jakob Čebašek	30 – 28 April 1991	2.00 m (6 ft 7 in)	Dinamo București	(Romania)
SF	77	Luka Dončić	22 – 28 February 1999	2.01 m (6 ft 7 in)	Dallas Mavericks	(United States)

Head coach

- (Slovenia) Aleksander Sekulić

Assistant coach(es)

- (Slovenia) Dalibor Damjanović
- (Slovenia) Dragiša Drobnjak
- (Slovenia) Jernej Valentinčič

Legend

- (C) Team captain
- Age – describes age
  on 25 July 2021

=== Spain ===
A 16-player roster was announced on 6 July 2021. The final squad was revealed on 19 July 2021.

Spain men's national basketball team roster
Players
Coaches

Pos.	No.	Name	Age – Date of birth	Height	Club	Ctr.
SF	3	Xabier López-Arostegui	24 – 19 May 1997	2.01 m (6 ft 7 in)	Valencia	(Spain)
F/C	4	Pau Gasol	41 – 6 July 1980	2.13 m (7 ft 0 in)	Barcelona	(Spain)
G/F	5	Rudy Fernández	36 – 4 April 1985	1.96 m (6 ft 5 in)	Real Madrid	(Spain)
PG	6	Sergio Rodríguez	35 – 12 June 1986	1.91 m (6 ft 3 in)	Olimpia Milano	(Italy)
PG	9	Ricky Rubio	30 – 21 October 1990	1.93 m (6 ft 4 in)	Minnesota Timberwolves	(United States)
SF	10	Víctor Claver	32 – 30 August 1988	2.07 m (6 ft 9 in)	Valencia	(Spain)
C	13	Marc Gasol	36 – 29 January 1985	2.10 m (6 ft 11 in)	Los Angeles Lakers	(United States)
C	14	Willy Hernangómez	27 – 27 May 1994	2.09 m (6 ft 10 in)	New Orleans Pelicans	(United States)
PF	16	Usman Garuba	19 – 9 March 2002	2.03 m (6 ft 8 in)	Real Madrid	(Spain)
SF	20	Alberto Abalde	25 – 15 December 1995	2.00 m (6 ft 7 in)	Real Madrid	(Spain)
G/F	21	Álex Abrines	27 – 1 August 1993	1.98 m (6 ft 6 in)	Barcelona	(Spain)
G	23	Sergio Llull	33 – 15 November 1987	1.92 m (6 ft 4 in)	Real Madrid	(Spain)

Head coach

- (Italy) Sergio Scariolo

Assistant coach(es)

- (Spain) Luis Guil
- (Spain) Ángel Sánchez

Legend

- Club – describes last
  club before the competition
- Age – describes age
  on 25 July 2021
