= 2025 Serbia men's EuroBasket team =

- Flag of Serbia
- President: Nebojša Čović
- Head coach: Svetislav Pešić
- Arena: Xiaomi Arena, Riga
- Preliminary Round: Group A Runner-up
- Knockout Stage: Round of 16
- PIR leader: Nikola Jokić 30.3
- Scoring leader: Nikola Jokić 22.3
- Rebounding leader: Nikola Jokić 9.0
- Assists leader: Stefan Jović 5.5
- Biggest win: +34; 98–64 Estonia (27 August 2025)
- Biggest defeat: –6; 86–92 Finland (6 September 2025)
Home	Away
- All statistics correct as of 6 September 2025.

The 2025 Serbia men's EuroBasket team represents Serbia at the EuroBasket 2025 in Cyprus, Finland, Poland, and Latvia. Serbia qualified for the EuroBasket by winning the EuroBasket 2025 qualification Group G.

The team is coached by FIBA Hall of Fame coach Svetislav Pešić, with assistant coaches Oliver Kostić, Marko Marinović, Nenad Jakovljević, Ognjen Stojaković and Mihajlo Mitić.

This will be the eighth appearance of Serbia at the EuroBasket as an independent state; its best results are second places in 2009 and 2017. Serbia last competed in EuroBasket 2022, finishing in ninth place with a 5–1 record, following a loss to Italy in the Round of 16.

== Timeline ==
- July 28: Announcement of the preliminary 17-man roster and the start of the training camp
- August 5–21: Exhibition games
- August 23: Final 12-man roster announcement
- August 27 – September 14: EuroBasket 2025

== Roster ==
A 17-player roster was announced on 28 July 2025. Several active players who were part of the preliminary team for the 2024 Olympic Games, including Vladimir Lučić, Ognjen Jaramaz, Dušan Ristić, Aleksej Pokuševski, and Aleksa Radanov, were not included in the call-up or declined the invitation for various reasons. The only player from the final 12-man Olympic roster who was not included in the preliminary squad is Uroš Plavšić.

The roster also did not feature Bogoljub Marković, a youngster who previously played for the senior national team and was drafted into the NBA this year, nor did it include Atlanta Hawks rookie Nikola Đurišić.

Alen Smailagić and Uroš Trifunović, although part of the team from the start of the training camp, did not appear in any official friendly matches due to injuries, and were the first players to be omitted from the roster on 20 August.

The final squad was announced on 23 August 2025. The roster, which includes ten players who participated in the previous year's Olympic Games, marked the return of veteran playmaker Stefan Jović, and the senior national team debut of Tristan Vukčević, a Washington Wizards player. Owing to his parents’ heritage, his birthplace, and the countries in which he developed as a youth player, Vukčević was eligible to represent Greece, Bosnia and Herzegovina, Sweden, Italy, Spain, or Serbia at the international level, ultimately electing to play for Serbia.

Serbia men's national basketball team – EuroBasket 2025 roster
Players
Coaches

Pos.	No.	Name	Age – Date of birth	Height	Club	Ctr.
F/C	3	Filip Petrušev	25 – 15 April 2000	2.11 m (6 ft 11 in)	Dubai Basketball	(United Arab Emirates)
F	5	Nikola Jović	22 – 9 June 2003	2.08 m (6 ft 10 in)	Miami Heat	(United States)
SG	7	Bogdan Bogdanović (injured)	33 – 18 August 1992	1.96 m (6 ft 5 in)	Los Angeles Clippers	(United States)
G/F	9	Vanja Marinković	28 – 9 January 1997	1.99 m (6 ft 6 in)	Partizan	(Serbia)
F/C	11	Tristan Vukčević	22 – 11 March 2003	2.13 m (7 ft 0 in)	Washington Wizards	(United States)
SF	13	Ognjen Dobrić	30 – 27 October 1994	2.01 m (6 ft 7 in)	Crvena zvezda	(Serbia)
C	15	Nikola Jokić	30 – 19 February 1995	2.11 m (6 ft 11 in)	Denver Nuggets	(United States)
PG	22	Vasilije Micić	31 – 13 January 1994	1.96 m (6 ft 5 in)	Hapoel Tel Aviv	(Israel)
SG	23	Marko Gudurić	30 – 8 March 1995	1.98 m (6 ft 6 in)	Olimpia Milano	(Italy)
PG	24	Stefan Jović (C)	34 – 3 November 1990	1.98 m (6 ft 6 in)	Free agent
PG	30	Aleksa Avramović	30 – 25 October 1994	1.92 m (6 ft 4 in)	Dubai Basketball	(United Arab Emirates)
C	33	Nikola Milutinov	30 – 30 December 1994	2.13 m (7 ft 0 in)	Olympiacos	(Greece)

Head coach

- (Serbia) (Germany) Svetislav Pešić

Assistant coach(es)

- (Serbia) Oliver Kostić
- (Serbia) Marko Marinović
- (Serbia) Nenad Jakovljević
- (Serbia) Ognjen Stojaković
- (Serbia) Mihajlo Mitić

Legend

- (C) Team captain
- Club – describes last
  club before the tournament
- Age – describes age
  on 27 August 2025

=== Depth chart ===
Pos.	Starting 5	Bench 1	Bench 2	Inactive
C	Nikola Jokić	Nikola Milutinov
PF	Filip Petrušev	Tristan Vukčević
SF	Nikola Jović	Ognjen Dobrić
SG	Marko Gudurić	Vanja Marinković		Bogdan Bogdanović (injured)
PG	Aleksa Avramović	Stefan Jović	Vasilije Micić

The following were candidates to make the team:

Earlier candidates
Player	Team (Note: Team at the time player was a candidate)	Added	Removed	Reason
Uroš Trifunović	(Israel) Maccabi Tel Aviv	28 July 2025	20 August 2025	Injured
Alen Smailagić	(Italy) Virtus Bologna	28 July 2025	20 August 2025	Injured
Balša Koprivica	(Turkey) Bahçeşehir Koleji	28 July 2025	23 August 2025	12-man roster cut
Dejan Davidovac	(Serbia) Crvena zvezda	28 July 2025	23 August 2025	12-man roster cut
Nikola Topić	(United States) Oklahoma City Thunder	28 July 2025	23 August 2025	12-man roster cut

== Staff ==
Position	Staff member
Head coach	(Serbia) Svetislav Pešić
Assistant coaches	(Serbia) Oliver Kostić
Assistant coaches	(Serbia) Marko Marinović
Assistant coaches	(Serbia) Nenad Jakovljević
Assistant coaches	(Serbia) Ognjen Stojaković
Assistant coaches	(Serbia) Mihajlo Mitić
Director / Vice President	(Serbia) Filip Sunturlić
Traineres	(Serbia) Feđa Sretenović
Traineres	(Serbia) Stefan Radoičić
Physicians	(Serbia) Dragan Radovanović
Physicians	(Serbia) Nebojša Mitrović
Physicians	(Serbia) Branislav Krivokapić
Physiotherapists	(United States) Robert Miller Jason
Physiotherapists	(Serbia) Dušan Sajić
Physiotherapists	(Serbia) Predrag Jovičić
Physiotherapists	(Serbia) Miodrag Ćirić
Team manager	(Serbia) Nebojša Ilić
Equipment manager	(Serbia) Jovica Aničić
Press officer	(Serbia) Nina Kolundžija
Videographer	(Serbia) Jelena Vamović

Source: KSS

== Exhibition games ==
Behind closed doors

August 5, 2025
(UTC+2)

Report

Serbia	126–89	Bosnia and Herzegovina
Scoring by quarter: 30–23, 34–16, 33–21, 29–29

Belgrade Arena
Belgrade, Serbia
Attendance: closed to the public

August 6, 2025
(UTC+2)

Report

Serbia	79–67	Poland
Scoring by quarter: 19–13, 18–18, 20–16, 22–20

Belgrade Arena
Belgrade, Serbia
Attendance: closed to the public

Ecommbx Cup

August 9, 2025
20:30 (UTC+3)

Report

Greece	66–76	Serbia
Scoring by quarter: 26–26, 8–17, 13–12, 19–21
Pts: Mitoglou 18; Rebs: Papanikolaou 6 Asts: T. Antetokounmpo 5		Pts: Jokić 23; Rebs: Jokić 19; Asts: Jokić 4

Spyros Kyprianou Athletic Center
Limassol, Cyprus
Attendance: 3,000
Referees: Ofer Manheim (ISR), Petar Pešić (SRB), Ioannis Tsibouris (GRE)

August 10, 2025
17:00 (UTC+3)

Report

Cyprus	55–122	Serbia
Scoring by quarter: 12–28, 10–38, 20–31, 13–25
Pts: Tigkas 17; Rebs: Stylianou 7 Asts: Willis, Michail 2		Pts: Vukčević 24; Rebs: Vukčević 7 Asts: Topić 7

Spyros Kyprianou Athletic Center
Limassol, Cyprus
Attendance: 1,500
Referees: Ofer Manheim (ISR), Petar Pešić (SRB), Nir Meirson (ISR)

DBB SuperCup

August 15, 2025
20:45 (UTC+2)

Report

Czech Republic	84–113	Serbia
Scoring by quarter: 21–29, 27–32, 20–31, 16–21
Pts: Kříž 12; Rebs: Peterka 5 Asts: Krejčí 5		Pts: Bogdanović 20; Rebs: three players 4 Asts: Jokić 6

SAP Garden
Munich, Germany
Attendance: 11,500
Referees: Gatis Saliņš (LAT), Carsen Straube (GER), Nermin Hodžić (BIH)

August 16, 2025
20:45 (UTC+2)

Report

Germany	81–91	Serbia
Scoring by quarter: 15–18, 17–20, 23–32, 26–21
Pts: F. Wagner 26; Rebs: Hollatz 5 Asts: Schröder 5		Pts: N. Jović 22; Rebs: Jokić 8 Asts: Jokić 7

SAP Garden
Munich, Germany
Attendance: 11,500
Referees: Peter Praksch (HUN), Martin Vulić (CRO), Gatis Saliņš (LAT)

Final friendly

August 21, 2025
20:00 (UTC+2)

Report

Serbia	106–72	Slovenia
Scoring by quarter: 33–23, 31–13, 27–20, 15–16
Pts: N. Jović 18; Rebs: Jokić 8 Asts: S. Jović 6		Pts: Dončić 17; Rebs: Dončić 7 Asts: Dončić 4

Belgrade Arena
Belgrade, Serbia
Attendance: 20,000
Referees: Ilija Belošević (SRB), Siniša Prpa (SRB), Petar Pešić (SRB)

== Tournament ==
=== Preliminary round ===
Serbia was placed in Group A.

Pos	Team	Pld	W	L	PF	PA	PD	Pts	Qualification
1	Turkey	5	5	0	459	359	+100	10	Knockout stage
2	Serbia	5	4	1	434	368	+66	9	Knockout stage
3	Latvia (H)	5	3	2	412	384	+28	8	Knockout stage
4	Portugal	5	2	3	315	368	−53	7	Knockout stage
5	Estonia	5	1	4	352	397	−45	6	
6	Czechia	5	0	5	338	434	−96	5	

Source: FIBA
Rules for classification: 1) Points; 2) Head-to-head results; 3) Points difference; 4) Points scored.
(H) Hosts

All times are local (GMT+3).

==== Estonia ====
27 August 2025
21:15

Boxscore

Serbia	98–64	Estonia
Scoring by quarter: 32–12, 24–17, 30–15, 12–20
Pts: N. Jović 18; Rebs: Jokić 10; Asts: Bogdanović, Jokić 7		Pts: Drell 11; Rebs: Riismaa, Treier 4 Asts: Vene 5

Xiaomi Arena, Riga
Attendance: 8,151
Referees: Antonio Conde (ESP), Lorenzo Baldini (ITA), Geert Jacobs (BEL)

==== Portugal ====
29 August 2025
21:15

Boxscore

Portugal	69–80	Serbia
Scoring by quarter: 19–23, 14–20, 16–21, 20–16
Pts: Brito 22; Rebs: Brito 9 Asts: Lisboa 4		Pts: Jokić 23; Rebs: Jokić 10; Asts: S. Jović 6

Xiaomi Arena, Riga
Attendance: 2,942
Referees: Gediminas Petraitis (USA), Wojciech Liszka (POL), Ilias Kounelles (CYP)

==== Latvia ====
30 August 2025
18:00

Boxscore

Latvia	80–84	Serbia
Scoring by quarter: 18–22, 20–20, 18–25, 24–17
Pts: Dā. Bertāns 16; Rebs: Dā. Bertāns 10; Asts: Žagars 6		Pts: Jokić 39; Rebs: Jokić 10; Asts: S. Jović 7

Xiaomi Arena, Riga
Attendance: 11,000
Referees: Gediminas Petraitis (USA), Antonio Conde (ESP), Fernando Calatrava (ESP)

==== Czechia ====
1 September 2025
21:15

Boxscore

Serbia	82–60	Czechia
Scoring by quarter: 27–5, 18–18, 16–20, 21–17
Pts: Avramović 14; Rebs: three players 7 Asts: Avramović 8		Pts: Bohačík 12; Rebs: Krejčí, Žídek 6 Asts: Sehnal 9

Xiaomi Arena, Riga
Attendance: 2,256
Referees: Wojciech Liszka (POL), Yohan Rosso (FRA), Dariusz Zapolski (POL)

==== Türkiye ====
3 September 2025
21:15

Boxscore

Turkey	95–90	Serbia
Scoring by quarter: 19–18, 27–31, 28–24, 21–17
Pts: Şengün 28; Rebs: Şengün 13; Asts: Larkin 9		Pts: Jokić 22; Rebs: Jokić 9 Asts: S. Jović 6

Xiaomi Arena, Riga
Attendance: 6,113
Referees: Gediminas Petraitis (USA), Wojciech Liszka (POL), Yohan Rosso (FRA)

=== Knockout stage ===
All times are local (GMT+3).

==== Round of 16: Finland ====
6 September 2025
21:45

Boxscore

Serbia	86–92	Finland
Scoring by quarter: 24–28, 24–16, 18–24, 20–24
Pts: Jokić 33; Rebs: Jokić 8 Asts: three players 4		Pts: Markkanen 29; Rebs: Little, Markkanen 8 Asts: Little 6

Xiaomi Arena, Riga
Attendance: 4,006
Referees: Jorge Vázquez (PUR), Takaki Kato (JPN), Luis Castillo (ESP)

== See also ==
- 2024 Serbia men's Olympic basketball team
- 2022 Serbia EuroBasket team
