= EuroBasket 2025 Group A =

International basketball event

Group A of EuroBasket 2025 consisted of Czech Republic, Estonia, Latvia, Portugal, Serbia, and Turkey. The games were played from 27 August to 3 September 2025 at the Xiaomi Arena in Riga, Latvia. The top four teams advanced to the knockout stage.

== Teams ==
Team	Qualification method	Date of qualification	App	First	Last	Streak	Best placement	World Ranking	
Team	Qualification method	Date of qualification	App	First	Last	Streak	Best placement	February 2025 (Note: The rankings of February 2025 were used for the final draw.)	August 2025
Portugal	Group A	21 February 2025	4th	1951	2011	1	Ninth place (2007)	56	56
Estonia	Group H	21 February 2025	7th	1937	2022	2	Fifth place (1937, 1939)	43	43
Latvia	Host nation	29 March 2022	15th	1935	2017	1	Champions (1935)	9	9
Turkey	Group B top three	25 November 2024	26th	1949	2022	15	Runners-up (2001)	27	27
Serbia	Group G top two	24 November 2024	8th	2007	2022	8	Runners-up (2009, 2017)	2	2
Czech Republic	Group F top two	21 February 2025	7th	1999	2022	5	Seventh place (2015)	19	19

== Standings ==
Pos	Team	Pld	W	L	PF	PA	PD	Pts	Qualification
1	Turkey	5	5	0	459	359	+100	10	Knockout stage
2	Serbia	5	4	1	434	368	+66	9	Knockout stage
3	Latvia (H)	5	3	2	412	384	+28	8	Knockout stage
4	Portugal	5	2	3	315	368	−53	7	Knockout stage
5	Estonia	5	1	4	352	397	−45	6	
6	Czech Republic	5	0	5	338	434	−96	5	

Source: FIBA
Rules for classification: 1) Points; 2) Head-to-head results; 3) Points difference; 4) Points scored.
(H) Hosts

== Matches ==
All times are local (UTC+3).

=== Czech Republic vs Portugal ===
27 August 2025
14:45

Boxscore

Czech Republic	50–62	Portugal
Scoring by quarter: 10–13, 19–19, 11–13, 10–17
Pts: Krejčí 10; Rebs: Peterka 7 Asts: three players 3		Pts: Queta 23; Rebs: Queta 18; Asts: Gameiro, Lisboa 3

Xiaomi Arena, Riga
Attendance: 1,279
Referees: Wojciech Liszka (POL), Marius Ciulin (ROU), Dariusz Zapolski (POL)

=== Latvia vs Turkey ===
27 August 2025
18:00

Boxscore

Latvia	73–93	Turkey
Scoring by quarter: 21–24, 18–23, 16–25, 18–21
Pts: Lomažs 16; Rebs: Gražulis 5 Asts: Zoriks 5		Pts: Osman 20; Rebs: Şengün 8 Asts: Şengün 7

Xiaomi Arena, Riga
Attendance: 11,000
Referees: Gediminas Petraitis (USA), Yohan Rosso (FRA), Fernando Calatrava (ESP)

=== Serbia vs Estonia ===
27 August 2025
21:15

Boxscore

Serbia	98–64	Estonia
Scoring by quarter: 32–12, 24–17, 30–15, 12–20
Pts: N. Jović 18; Rebs: Jokić 10; Asts: Bogdanović, Jokić 7		Pts: Drell 11; Rebs: Riismaa, Treier 4 Asts: Vene 5

Xiaomi Arena, Riga
Attendance: 8,151
Referees: Antonio Conde (ESP), Lorenzo Baldini (ITA), Geert Jacobs (BEL)

=== Turkey vs Czech Republic ===
29 August 2025
14:45

Boxscore

Turkey	92–78	Czech Republic
Scoring by quarter: 21–27, 24–10, 27–25, 20–16
Pts: Şengün 23; Rebs: Şengün 12; Asts: Şengün 9		Pts: Peterka 23; Rebs: Peterka 5 Asts: Sehnal 8

Xiaomi Arena, Riga
Attendance: 1,478
Referees: Antonio Conde (ESP), Lorenzo Baldini (ITA), Josip Jurčević (CRO)

=== Estonia vs Latvia ===
29 August 2025
18:00

Boxscore

Estonia	70–72	Latvia
Scoring by quarter: 21–17, 21–21, 19–25, 9–9
Pts: Konontšuk, Tass 13; Rebs: Jõesaar, Kullamäe 6 Asts: Kullamäe 8		Pts: Porziņģis 26; Rebs: Dāv. Bertāns 11; Asts: Žagars 6

Xiaomi Arena, Riga
Attendance: 10,291
Referees: Yohan Rosso (FRA), Marius Ciulin (ROU), Fernando Calatrava (ESP)

=== Portugal vs Serbia ===
29 August 2025
21:15

Boxscore

Portugal	69–80	Serbia
Scoring by quarter: 19–23, 14–20, 16–21, 20–16
Pts: Brito 22; Rebs: Brito 9 Asts: Lisboa 4		Pts: Jokić 23; Rebs: Jokić 10; Asts: S. Jović 6

Xiaomi Arena, Riga
Attendance: 2,942
Referees: Gediminas Petraitis (USA), Wojciech Liszka (POL), Ilias Kounelles (CYP)

=== Czech Republic vs Estonia ===
30 August 2025
14:45

Boxscore

Czech Republic	75–89	Estonia
Scoring by quarter: 19–23, 17–31, 18–23, 21–12
Pts: Žídek 14; Rebs: Bohačík 7 Asts: three players 4		Pts: Kullamäe 16; Rebs: Jõesaar 8 Asts: Kullamäe 7

Xiaomi Arena, Riga
Attendance: 8,190
Referees: Wojciech Liszka (POL), Lorenzo Baldini (ITA), Geert Jacobs (BEL)

=== Latvia vs Serbia ===
30 August 2025
18:00

Boxscore

Latvia	80–84	Serbia
Scoring by quarter: 18–22, 20–20, 18–25, 24–17
Pts: Dāv. Bertāns 16; Rebs: Dāv. Bertāns 10; Asts: Žagars 6		Pts: Jokić 39; Rebs: Jokić 10; Asts: S. Jović 7

Xiaomi Arena, Riga
Attendance: 11,000
Referees: Gediminas Petraitis (USA), Antonio Conde (ESP), Fernando Calatrava (ESP)

=== Turkey vs Portugal ===
30 August 2025
21:15

Boxscore

Turkey	95–54	Portugal
Scoring by quarter: 22–13, 29–14, 22–10, 22–17
Pts: Şengün 20; Rebs: Şengün 7 Asts: three players 5		Pts: Queta 15; Rebs: Queta 7 Asts: Amarante, Brito 3

Xiaomi Arena, Riga
Attendance: 1,277
Referees: Yohan Rosso (FRA), Marius Ciulin (ROU), Dariusz Zapolski (POL)

=== Estonia vs Turkey ===
1 September 2025
14:45

Boxscore

Estonia	64–84	Turkey
Scoring by quarter: 13–25, 14–21, 22–19, 15–19
Pts: Kullamäe 16; Rebs: five players 3 Asts: Konontšuk 5		Pts: Şengün 21; Rebs: Osmani 10; Asts: Şengün 5

Xiaomi Arena, Riga
Attendance: 4,844
Referees: Antonio Conde (ESP), Fernando Calatrava (ESP), Josip Jurčević (CRO)

=== Portugal vs Latvia ===
1 September 2025
18:00

Boxscore

Portugal	62–78	Latvia
Scoring by quarter: 21–23, 7–27, 15–15, 19–13
Pts: Lisboa 17; Rebs: Queta 7 Asts: Lisboa 4		Pts: Porziņģis 21; Rebs: Porziņģis 9 Asts: Lomažs 7

Xiaomi Arena, Riga
Attendance: 11,000
Referees: Gediminas Petraitis (USA), Lorenzo Baldini (ITA), Ilias Kounelles (CYP)

=== Serbia vs Czech Republic ===
1 September 2025
21:15

Boxscore

Serbia	82–60	Czech Republic
Scoring by quarter: 27–5, 18–18, 16–20, 21–17
Pts: Avramović 14; Rebs: three players 7 Asts: Avramović 8		Pts: Bohačík 12; Rebs: Krejčí, Žídek 6 Asts: Sehnal 9

Xiaomi Arena, Riga
Attendance: 2,256
Referees: Wojciech Liszka (POL), Yohan Rosso (FRA), Dariusz Zapolski (POL)

=== Estonia vs Portugal ===
3 September 2025
14:45

Boxscore

Estonia	65–68	Portugal
Scoring by quarter: 14–14, 18–13, 13–20, 20–21
Pts: Konontšuk 20; Rebs: Jõesaar 7 Asts: Kullamäe 6		Pts: Lisboa 17; Rebs: Queiroz 9 Asts: Lisboa 5

Xiaomi Arena, Riga
Attendance: 5,010
Referees: Antonio Conde (ESP), Lorenzo Baldini (ITA), Marius Ciulin (ROU)

=== Czech Republic vs Latvia ===
3 September 2025
18:00

Boxscore

Czech Republic	75–109	Latvia
Scoring by quarter: 24–30, 20–28, 12–28, 19–23
Pts: three players 11; Rebs: Peterka 6 Asts: Sehnal 8		Pts: Dai. Bertāns, Dāv. Bertāns 20; Rebs: Porziņģis 7 Asts: Lomažs 10

Xiaomi Arena, Riga
Attendance: 11,000
Referees: Fernando Calatrava (ESP), Dariusz Zapolski (POL), Geert Jacobs (BEL)

=== Turkey vs Serbia ===
3 September 2025
21:15

Boxscore

Turkey	95–90	Serbia
Scoring by quarter: 19–18, 27–31, 28–24, 21–17
Pts: Şengün 28; Rebs: Şengün 13; Asts: Larkin 9		Pts: Jokić 22; Rebs: Jokić 9 Asts: S. Jović 6

Xiaomi Arena, Riga
Attendance: 6,113
Referees: Gediminas Petraitis (USA), Wojciech Liszka (POL), Yohan Rosso (FRA)
