= Patrick Samoura =

Czech-born basketball player

No. 6 – USK Praha
- Position: Guard / Forward
- League: Czech National Basketball League

Personal information
- Born: 15 November 2000 (age 26) Beroun, Czech Republic
- Listed height: 6 ft 6 in (1.98 m)
- Listed weight: 230 lb (104 kg)

Career information
- High school: Gymnazium Pripotocni
- College: Cochise (2019–2021); UT Tyler (2021–2022)

Career history
- 2018–2019: USK Praha
- 2020: USK Praha
- 2022–present: USK Praha

Patrick Samoura (born 15 November 2000) is a Czech professional basketball player for USK Praha of the Czech National Basketball League (NBL). He played college basketball for the Cochise Apaches and the UT Tyler Patriots. He also represents the Czech Republic national team.

== Early life ==
Samoura was born on 15 November 2000 in Beroun, Czech Republic to a Guinean father and a Czech mother, who met while studying at the Czech Technical University in Prague. He faced racial prejudice growing up because of his skin color: he says that he "began to notice that something was wrong" in kindergarten based on how he was treated by his classmates and that he slowly learned to deal with it.

Samoura played handball in his early years, claiming to have chosen basketball "by accident" after receiving a PlayStation 2 at age seven from his uncle and buying a basketball game. He and his brother played the game everyday, and Patrick enjoyed it so much that he signed up for a local team. He played with local club BK Beroun up until the under-13 level before switching to USK Praha. He competed in the 2016–17 Adidas Next Generation Tournament for the USK Future Stars, averaging 6.5 points and 4.8 rebounds per game.

== College career ==
Samoura moved to the United States in 2019 to attend Cochise College in Douglas, Arizona, where he played JUCO basketball with the Apaches for two seasons. Unaccustomed to the accelerated pace of play, he later said he felt "completely dead" after his first practice but learned to adjust before the start of the season. As a freshman, he averaged 7.7 points, 6.3 rebounds and 2.4 assists across 30 games, contributing to a ACCAC regular season title. In his sophomore year, shortened by the COVID-19 pandemic, Samoura averaged 8.8 points, 9.1 rebounds and 1.3 assists per game. He helped Cochise finish with an 11–3 record, capturing their third straight ACCAC title as well as the NJCCA Region I title. Samoura led the Apaches with a 16-point, 11 rebound double-double in the first round of the NJCAA Men's Division I Basketball Tournament, but they fell to Ranger College in his final JUCO game by a score of 68–86. He earned NJCAA first-team All-Academic honors and served on the NJCAA Student-Athlete Council, graduating in May 2021 with a general studies associate degree.

Samoura transferred to NCAA Division II school UT Tyler ahead of the 2021–22 season. He scored 11 points in his first official game, a 116–57 win over Southwestern Adventist on November 17, 2021. Samoura played in 16 games and made 12 starts before his season was cut short due to a knee injury. He averaged 4.9 points and 3.2 rebounds in 19.4 minutes per game.

== Professional career ==
Samoura made his National Basketball League (NBL) debut with the USK Praha senior squad on 30 September 2018, coming off the bench in a loss to Sluneta Ústí nad Labem. He averaged about two points per game on limited minutes in his first professional season.

Following his freshman year at Cochise College, Samoura returned to USK Praha for the first half of the 2020–21 NBL season, where he became one of the team's key offensive players. He started 14 of the 16 games he played, recording averages of 13.0 points, 5.1 rebounds, 3.8 assists and 1.7 steals per contest. Samoura earned player of the week honors from Eurobasket.com for his performance in their 90–72 round 5 victory against Tuři Svitavy on 26 September, where he scored a career-high 29 points along with six rebounds and six assists. On 12 December, he had 26 points, 11 assists, five rebounds and five steals in their 98–94 win over Kralovsti Sokoli in round 14. He left the team in December to rejoin his college team for his sophomore season.

Samoura once again returned to USK Praha in September 2022.

== National team career ==
Samoura represented the Czech Republic at the 2016 FIBA U16 European Championship Division B, where he averaged 4.5 points, 4.5 rebounds, 2.0 assists and 1.6 steals per game. He also played for the national under-18 team: first in the 2017 FIBA U18 European Championship Division B, where he averaged 5.0 points, 4.1 assists and 2.2 assists per game to help his team to a 13th-place finish, then at the 2018 FIBA U18 European Championship Division B, where he averaged 10.4 points, 6.9 rebounds 4.3 assists and 1.3 steals per game en route to a fifth-place finish at the tournament.

Samoura was first called up to the senior national team in November 2020 for EuroBasket 2022 qualifiers against Belgium and Denmark, but he was cut from the final roster during training camp. In early June 2021, he was named to the preliminary 18-man Czech squad for the 2020 FIBA Victoria Olympic Qualifying Tournament (OQT). In the lead-up to the qualifiers he made his senior international debut by in a pair of exhibitions against Finland. His performance earned him a spot in the starting lineup against Germany and Italy at the VFG Supercup in Hamburg later that month, when the roster was reduced to 15 players. Teammate Martin Peterka praised Samoura's defense and his ability to fight for every ball, comparing him to former Czech national team captain Pavel Pumprla. He was subsequently included on the 12-man Olympic roster. Samoura started in both of the team's group stage games (against Turkey and Uruguay) at the Victoria OQT in July. He did not appear in their semi-final upset of host team Canada, but did come off the bench in their victory over Greece in the finals that clinched the Czech Republic's spot at the Olympics. However, Samoura was ultimately replaced by veteran David Jelínek on the final Olympic squad.
