= 2020 FIBA Men's Olympic Qualifying Tournaments – Victoria =

2020 FIBA World Olympic Qualifying Tournament for Men
Victoria, Canada

Tournament details
- Host country: Canada
- Dates: 29 June – 4 July 2021
- Teams: 6
- Venue(s): 1 (in 1 host city)

Final positions
- Champions: Czech Republic

Tournament statistics
- MVP: (Czech Republic) Tomas Satoransky
- Top scorer: (Uruguay) Jayson Granger (23.5)
- Top rebounds: (Czech Republic) Ondrej Balvin (11.0)
- Top assists: (Uruguay) Jayson Granger (8.5)
- PPG (Team): Canada (102.3)
- RPG (Team): Canada (43.0)
- APG (Team): Canada (22.0)

Official website
- WOQT Canada

The 2020 FIBA Men's Olympic Qualifying Tournament in Victoria was one of four 2020 FIBA Men's Olympic Qualifying Tournaments. The tournament was held in Victoria, Canada. It was originally scheduled to take place from 23 to 28 June 2020 but was postponed due to the COVID-19 pandemic, to 29 June to 4 July 2021.

The tournament was played behind closed doors due to the pandemic.

== Teams ==
Team	Qualification	Date of qualification	FIBA World Ranking
Canada	21st at the 2019 FIBA Basketball World Cup	15 September 2019	21st
Greece	11th at the 2019 FIBA Basketball World Cup	15 September 2019	6th
Czech Republic	6th at the 2019 FIBA Basketball World Cup	15 September 2019	12th
Turkey	20th at the 2019 FIBA Basketball World Cup	15 September 2019	15th
China	Wild card	19 September 2019	29th
Uruguay	Wild card	19 September 2019	45th

== Venue ==
Victoria	2020 FIBA Men's Olympic Qualifying Tournaments – Victoria (Canada)
Save-On-Foods Memorial Centre	2020 FIBA Men's Olympic Qualifying Tournaments – Victoria (Canada)
Capacity: 7,400	2020 FIBA Men's Olympic Qualifying Tournaments – Victoria (Canada)

== Preliminary round ==
All times are local (UTC−7).

=== Group A ===
Pos	Team	Pld	W	L	PF	PA	PD	Pts	Qualification
1	Canada (H)	2	2	0	206	170	+36	4	Semi-finals
2	Greece	2	1	1	196	177	+19	3	Semi-finals
3	China	2	0	2	159	214	−55	2	

Source: FIBA
Rules for classification: 1) points; 2) head-to-head points; 3) head-to-head points difference; 4) head-to-head number of points scored.
(H) Hosts

29 June 2021
16:05

Boxscore

Greece	91–97	Canada
Scoring by quarter: 23–19, 27–27, 21–28, 20–23
Pts: Mitoglou 14; Rebs: Mitoglou 10; Asts: Calathes 9		Pts: Wiggins 23; Rebs: Powell 7 Asts: Joseph 6

Save-On-Foods Memorial Centre, Victoria
Referees: Antonio Conde (ESP), Steven Anderson (USA), Luis Castillo (ESP)

30 June 2021
16:05

Boxscore

Canada	109–79	China
Scoring by quarter: 27–19, 32–27, 20–19, 30–14
Pts: Wiggins 20; Rebs: Powell 9 Asts: Joseph 7		Pts: Hu 24; Rebs: Shen 8 Asts: Zhao 5

Save-On-Foods Memorial Centre, Victoria
Referees: Aleksandar Glišić (SRB), Leandro Lezcano (ARG), Luis Castillo (ESP)

1 July 2021
16:05

Boxscore

China	80–105	Greece
Scoring by quarter: 14–28, 18–24, 27–24, 21–29
Pts: Hu 16; Rebs: Zhou Q. 10; Asts: Hu 5		Pts: Larentzakis 21; Rebs: Mitoglou 7 Asts: Calathes 8

Save-On-Foods Memorial Centre, Victoria
Referees: Antonio Conde (ESP), Luis Castillo (ESP), Ahmed Al-Shuwaili (IRQ)

=== Group B ===
Pos	Team	Pld	W	L	PF	PA	PD	Pts	Qualification
1	Turkey	2	2	0	182	156	+26	4	Semi-finals
2	Czech Republic	2	1	1	150	166	−16	3	Semi-finals
3	Uruguay	2	0	2	165	175	−10	2	

Source: FIBA
Rules for classification: 1) points; 2) head-to-head points; 3) head-to-head points difference; 4) head-to-head number of points scored.

29 June 2021
19:35

Boxscore

Uruguay	86–95	Turkey
Scoring by quarter: 22–27, 15–16, 26–18, 23–34
Pts: Granger 25; Rebs: Calfani 8 Asts: Granger 10		Pts: Osman 27; Rebs: Osman 9 Asts: Tuncer 5

Save-On-Foods Memorial Centre, Victoria
Referees: Aleksandar Glišić (SRB), Leandro Lezcano (ARG), Ahmed Al-Shuwaili (IRQ)

30 June 2021
19:35

Boxscore

Turkey	87–70	Czech Republic
Scoring by quarter: 17–14, 28–24, 18–16, 24–16
Pts: Korkmaz 20; Rebs: Şengün, Yurtseven 7 Asts: Osman 6		Pts: Satoranský 15; Rebs: Veselý 11; Asts: Satoranský 6

Save-On-Foods Memorial Centre, Victoria
Referees: Antonio Conde (ESP), Steven Anderson (USA), Boris Krejić (SLO)

1 July 2021
19:35

Boxscore

Czech Republic	80–79	Uruguay
Scoring by quarter: 19–20, 26–17, 22–20, 13–22
Pts: Satoranský 19; Rebs: Balvín 11; Asts: Satoranský 8		Pts: Fitipaldo, Granger 22; Rebs: Granger 7 Asts: Granger 7

Save-On-Foods Memorial Centre, Victoria
Referees: Steven Anderson (USA), Aleksandar Glišić (SRB), Boris Krejić (SLO)

== Final round ==
Semi-finals
3 July
Canada	101
Czech Republic (OT)	103
3 July
Turkey	63
Greece	81

Final
4 July
Czech Republic	97
Greece	72

=== Semi-finals ===
3 July 2021
13:05

Boxscore

Canada	101–103 (OT)	Czech Republic
Scoring by quarter: 27–29, 17–23, 16–15, 34–27, Overtime: 7–9
Pts: Barrett 23; Rebs: Lyles 11; Asts: Barrett 6		Pts: Schilb 31; Rebs: Balvín 19; Asts: Schilb 7

Save-On-Foods Memorial Centre, Victoria
Referees: Aleksandar Glišić (SRB), Leandro Lezcano (ARG), Luis Castillo (ESP)

3 July 2021
16:35

Boxscore

Turkey	63–81	Greece
Scoring by quarter: 22–8, 12–19, 13–24, 16–30
Pts: Korkmaz 20; Rebs: Osman 7 Asts: Osman 3		Pts: Calathes 18; Rebs: Papagiannis 13; Asts: Sloukas 9

Save-On-Foods Memorial Centre, Victoria
Referees: Antonio Conde (ESP), Steven Anderson (USA), Boris Krejić (SLO)

=== Final ===
4 July 2021
16:05

Boxscore

Czech Republic	97–72	Greece
Scoring by quarter: 32–22, 18–21, 31–11, 16–18
Pts: Auda 20; Rebs: Balvín, Veselý 8 Asts: Šiřina 6		Pts: Papagiannis 14; Rebs: Mitoglou, Rogkavopoulos 4 Asts: Calathes, Katsivelis 3

Save-On-Foods Memorial Centre, Victoria
Referees: Antonio Conde (ESP), Steven Anderson (USA), Boris Krejić (SLO)

== Final ranking ==
#	Team	W–L	Qualification
1	Czech Republic	3–1	Qualified for the Olympics
2	Greece	2–2	
3	Canada	2–1	
4	Turkey	2–1	
5	Uruguay	0–2	
6	China	0–2	
