= Dalibor Damjanović =

Slovenian basketball coach

Cedevita Olimpija
- Position: Assistant coach
- League: Slovenian First League; ABA League; EuroCup

Personal information
- Born: 12 September 1977 (age 49) Kranj, SR Slovenia, SFR Yugoslavia
- Coaching career: 2002–present

Career history

Coaching
- 2002–2005: Triglav Kranj (assistant)
- 2005–2006: Triglav Kranj
- 2006–2008: Anwil Włocławek (assistant)
- 2008–2010: Škofja Loka
- 2010–2011: Triglav Kranj
- 2011–2014: Helios Domžale (assistant)
- 2015–2016: ŽKD Ilirija
- 2016–2021: Krka (assistant)
- 2021–2022: Krka
- 2023–2024: Kaposvári KK
- 2024–present: Cedevita Olimpija (assistant)

Dalibor Damjanović (born 12 September 1977) is a Slovenian professional basketball coach.

== Coaching career ==
Damjanović started his coaching career in 2002 as an assistant coach for Triglav Kranj, where he worked for three seasons. For the 2005–06 season, he got promoted to their head coach. Between 2006 and 2008, Damjanović was an assistant coach for Anwil Włocławek under head coach Aleš Pipan. Later, he was the head coach for TCG Mercator Škofja Loka until the end of the 2009–10 season. Damjanović worked as an assistant coach for Helios Domžale under head coach Zmago Sagadin for three seasons, between 2011 and 2014. In the 2015–16 season, he was the head coach of the women's basketball club Ilirija.

In January 2016, Damjanović became an assistant coach for Krka. On 17 March 2021, Krka promoted Damjanović as the new head coach following departure of Vladimir Anzulović.

On 18 December 2023, Damjanović was named the head coach of Kaposvári KK in the Nemzeti Bajnokság I/A league (the top basketball league in Hungary).

On 3 August 2024, Damjanović was hired as an assistant coach for Cedevita Olimpija of the Slovenian Basketball League, ABA League and EuroCup.

== National team coaching career ==
Damjanović was an assistant coach for the Slovenia national under-20 team at three FIBA U20 European Championship, between 2010 and 2012.

In July 2018, Damjanović the head coach of the Slovenia under-20 team that won the silver medal at the FIBA U20 European Championship Division B in Sofia, Bulgaria.

In November 2020, Damjanović was named an assistant coach for the Slovenia national team under Aleksander Sekulić. He was a coaching staff member at the 2020 Summer Olympics in Tokyo.

== Career achievements ==
As head coach

- Slovenian Cup winner: 1 (with Krka: 2020–21)
- 2018 FIBA U20 European Championship Division B: Silver

As assistant coach

- ABA League Second Division champion: 1 (with Krka: 2017–18)
- Polish Cup winner: 1 (with Anwil Włocławek: 2006–07)
- Polish Supercup winner: 1 (with Anwil Włocławek: 2007–08)
