= Czech Republic men's national basketball team =

Men's national basketball team representing the Czech Republic

Czech Republic
- FIBA ranking: 23 (1 September 2026)
- Joined FIBA: 1993
- FIBA zone: FIBA Europe
- National federation: ČBF
- Coach: Luboš Bartoň

Olympic Games
- Appearances: 1
- Medals: None

FIBA World Cup
- Appearances: 1
- Medals: None

EuroBasket
- Appearances: 7
- Medals: None
Home	Away

First international
- Czech Republic 65–94 Slovenia (Wrocław, Poland; 30 May 1993)

Biggest win
- Czech Republic 135–60 Cyprus (Prievidza, Slovakia; 22 June 1993)

Biggest defeat
- Slovenia 99–59 Czech Republic (Koper, Slovenia; 27 February 2026)

The Czech Republic men's national basketball team (Czech: Česká basketbalová reprezentace), recognised by FIBA as Czechia, represents the Czech Republic in international basketball. The team is controlled by the Czech Basketball Federation (ČBF).

Following the dissolution of Czechoslovakia, the Czech Republic national team made their debut in international competition in a qualifier for the EuroBasket in 1993. The team has qualified for the tournament seven times overall. The Czech Republic has also qualified for the FIBA World Cup, where the team reached the quarter-finals in 2019, during their first appearance at the event.

== History ==
=== 1990s ===
In 1993, the Czech Republic national team was officially founded after the dissolution of Czechoslovakia. The team played their first international match on 30 May 1993 against Slovenia.

After several failed attempts at qualifying in 1993, 1995, and 1997 the Czech Republic finally clinched qualification to the EuroBasket finals tournament for the first time after independence at EuroBasket 1999. The national team got off to a quick start, as they won their first two preliminary round matches against Lithuania and Greece, before losing to Germany in their final game of group play. With a record of (2–1), the Czech Republic booked their place into the second group phase. There, the team was thoroughly dominated against Croatia and Italy, before losing a close battle against Turkey 73–78 to exit the tournament. In all, the Czech Republic finished their maiden voyage to the EuroBasket in 12th place. While national team standout Luboš Bartoň took the honor of being the second best scorer of the tournament averaging (18.7 points per game).

=== 2000s ===
Throughout the 2000s for the Czech Republic, the national team suffered numerous setbacks. Failed attempts to qualify for the EuroBasket on multiple occasions were demoralising reminders that the team had to become stronger in order to compete with the best on the continental stage. However, during qualification for EuroBasket 2007, led by national team veterans Jiří Welsch, Luboš Bartoň and Petr Benda, the Czech Republic would qualify for their second overall appearance at the competition. In their first game at the 2007 tournament, the national team would lose in a classic against the Dirk Nowitzki led Germany squad in overtime 78–83. The tough loss for the team carried over into their next match, where they would suffer a heavy defeat at the hands of Lithuania 95–75. With one game left in group play, and still an opportunity to advance the Czechs would come up short again, this time to Turkey 72–80 to be eliminated.

=== 2010s ===
After missing out on the EuroBasket in 2011, the Czech Republic turned the page to qualify for EuroBasket 2013. Their first game of the tournament was against hosts Slovenia. However, the team would succumb in a narrowly contested game between the two sides 60–62. Although the Czechs would show resilience in their second match against Poland, behind a dominant game from big man Jan Veselý and his (23 points and 14 rebounds) to win 68–69. After the strong win for the Czech Republic, their third game of the tournament was a total calamity for the team, as they were completely mauled by the eventual champions Spain 60–39. The humbling loss for the team however, fueled them to a win in their next game against Georgia 95–79. Heading into their final match of group play, with the possibility of advancing all but gone the Czechs would fall to Croatia 70–53.

The Czech Republic entered the EuroBasket 2015, after going (4–2) during qualifying to make their fourth EuroBasket appearance. To begin their 2015 tournament run, the Czech Republic was placed into Group D. The team would easily win their first two matches of the event, before their date versus co-hosts Latvia. However, even with strong games from team captain Tomáš Satoranský (22 points and 9 assists), and center Jan Veselý (17 points and 11 rebounds), Latvia still prevailed 65–72. After the loss, the Czechs would regroup to split their final two games of the group phase to advance to the Round of 16. There, the team displayed supreme focus to defeat Croatia 59–80, to send the team into the quarter-finals of the EuroBasket for the first time. With a chance to reach the semi-finals on the line, the Czechs would fall short against Serbia 89–75. After the tough loss, the team would play two more games in the Olympic bracket qualifier to finish the tournament.

The following year, in qualification for the 2016 Olympic tournament, the Czech Republic failed to qualify after going (1–2) and being eliminated, losing to Serbia once again.

At EuroBasket 2017, the Czech Republic was drawn into Group C for their stint at the tournament. Although the team was quickly eliminated, failing to make it out of the group stage after posting a disappointing (1–4) record.

During European Qualifiers for the 2019 FIBA World Cup, the Czech Republic amassed an (8–4) record during qualifying to solidify their first ever trip to the World Cup finals. Heading toward the 2019 FIBA World Cup, the Czech Republic was slotted into Group E to begin the tournament. The first game for the team, however, turned out to be a loss against the heavily favoured United States 67–88. Going into their second match of the tournament, the Czechs picked up their first ever World Cup finals victory over Japan 76–89. With one game to go, and a path to advance into the second group phase, the team would pullout a solid 76–91 win versus Turkey.

Entering the second group phase, the Czech Republic continued their impressive play as the team picked up a huge victory, this time against Brazil 71–93. Although in their final match of group play, the Czechs suffered an 77–84 defeat to Greece. Even after the tough loss, the team would get the help it needed to advance into the quarter-finals, due to the United States eliminating Brazil.

In the quarter-finals, unfortunately, the tournament run for the Czechs would come to an end. The team would be eliminated 82–70 by Australia. With classification matches to determine the final positions, the team would split their two games to be awarded sixth place.

=== 2020s ===
In June 2021, the Czech Republic entered a qualifying tournament for the 2020 Olympic Games, which was delayed a year due to the COVID-19 pandemic. After splitting their first two matches in the preliminary round (1–1), the Czechs advanced into the semi-finals, and upset the hosts Canada in overtime 101–103. In the final, the Czech Republic dominated Greece 97–72, to qualify to the Olympics for the first time. At the competition placed in Group A, the Czech Republic won the first match of the event against Iran 78–84. Following the win, the Czechs would suffer two heavy losses in their final two games of the group stage to be eliminated.

Heading toward EuroBasket 2022, the Czech Republic was named as one of four co-hosts for the competition. Entering the tournament drawn into Group D, after losing their first two matches in the event, the Czechs earned their first win against the Netherlands 88–80. Following the victory, the Czech Republic failed to carry the momentum from their previous match, as they lost to Finland 98–88. In their final game of the group stage, with a win needed against Israel to advance into the Round of 16, captain Tomáš Satoranský's near triple-double (14 points, 8 rebounds and 11 assists) propelled the Czechs to the knockout stage 88–77. There, the Czech Republic would fall short in a hard-fought defeat against Giannis Antetokounmpo and Greece 94–88.

The Czech Republic then pivoted toward European Qualifiers for the 2023 FIBA World Cup, where they went on to eventually complete their campaign at an underwhelming (3–9) record to miss the tournament. Following the disappointment of failing to qualify for the World Cup, the Czech Republic's participation in the 2024 Olympic pre-qualifying tournament ended with a preliminary round exit.

After an inconsistent qualifying period for the Czech Republic, they managed to book their seventh appearance on the continental stage at EuroBasket 2025. However, following being drawn into Group A at the tournament, the Czechs displayed dismal performances throughout the group stage, losing all five of their matches to be eliminated. In the aftermath of the Czechs poor showing at the Euros, head coach Diego Ocampo stepped down from his position, and was replaced with former national team star Luboš Bartoň.

== Competitive record ==
=== FIBA World Cup ===
World Cup					Qualification		
Year	Position	Pld	W	L	Pld	W	L
1950 to 1990	Part of Czechoslovakia						
(Canada) 1994	Did not qualify				EuroBasket served as qualifiers		
(Greece) 1998	Did not qualify				EuroBasket served as qualifiers		
(United States) 2002	Did not qualify				EuroBasket served as qualifiers		
(Japan) 2006	Did not qualify				EuroBasket served as qualifiers		
(Turkey) 2010	Did not qualify				EuroBasket served as qualifiers		
(Spain) 2014	Did not qualify				EuroBasket served as qualifiers		
(China) 2019	6th	8	4	4	12	8	4
(Philippines) (Japan) (Indonesia) 2023	Did not qualify				12	3	9
(Qatar) 2027	Did not qualify				6	3	3
(France) 2031	To be determined				To be determined		
Total	1/9	8	4	4	30	14	16

=== Olympic Games ===
Olympic Games					Qualifying		
Year	Position	Pld	W	L	Pld	W	L
1936 to 1992	Part of Czechoslovakia						
(United States) 1996	Did not qualify				Did not qualify		
(Australia) 2000	Did not qualify				Did not qualify		
(Greece) 2004	Did not qualify				Did not qualify		
(China) 2008	Did not qualify				Did not qualify		
(United Kingdom) 2012	Did not qualify				Did not qualify		
(Brazil) 2016	Did not qualify				3	1	2
(Japan) 2020	9th	3	1	2	4	3	1
(France) 2024	Did not qualify				3	2	1
(United States) 2028	To be determined				To be determined		
Total	1/8	3	1	2	10	6	4

=== EuroBasket ===
EuroBasket					Qualification		
Year	Position	Pld	W	L	Pld	W	L
1935 to 1991	Part of Czechoslovakia						
(Germany) 1993	Did not qualify				9	3	6
(Greece) 1995	Did not qualify				10	4	6
(Spain) 1997	Did not qualify				10	3	7
(France) 1999	12th	6	2	4	13	9	4
(Turkey) 2001	Did not qualify				10	5	5
(Sweden) 2003	Did not qualify				16	9	7
(Serbia and Montenegro) 2005	Did not qualify				12	5	7
(Spain) 2007	15th	3	0	3	6	4	2
(Poland) 2009	Did not qualify				12	5	7
(Lithuania) 2011	Division B				6	5	1
(Slovenia) 2013	14th	5	2	3	8	5	3
(France) (Croatia) (Germany) (Latvia) 2015	7th	9	5	4	6	4	2
(Finland) (Israel) (Romania) (Turkey) 2017	20th	5	1	4	Direct qualification		
(Czech Republic) (Georgia (country)) (Italy) (Germany) 2022	16th	6	2	4	6	2	4
(Cyprus) (Finland) (Poland) (Latvia) 2025	23rd	5	0	5	6	2	4
(Estonia) (Greece) (Slovenia) (Spain) 2029	To be determined				In progress		
Total	7/15	39	12	27	130	65	65

== Results and fixtures ==
Win Loss

=== 2025 ===
28 November 2025 2027 FIBA World Cup qualifiers – 1st round	Czech Republic	97–80	Sweden	Prague, Czech Republic
19:30 CET (UTC+1)	Scoring by quarter: 27–22, 20–24, 27–17, 23–17
	Pts: Satoranský 16; Rebs: Sehnal 6 Asts: Satoranský, Sehnal 6	Boxscore	Pts: Borg 18; Rebs: Falk, Håkanson 6 Asts: Håkanson 15	Arena: Královka Arena; Attendance: 1,961; Referees: Ademir Zurapović, (BIH), Josip Jurčević (CRO), Juozas Barkauskas (LTU)

1 December 2025 2027 FIBA World Cup qualifiers – 1st round	Estonia	92–97	Czech Republic	Tallinn, Estonia
20:00 EET (UTC+2)	Scoring by quarter: 29–27, 24–31, 21–22, 18–17
	Pts: Treier 26; Rebs: Konontšuk 5 Asts: Jõesaar 8	Boxscore	Pts: Satoranský 18; Rebs: Peterka, Sehnal 5 Asts: Satoranský 16	Arena: Unibet Arena; Attendance: 6,594; Referees: Martin Horozov (BUL), Zafer Yılmaz (TUR), Silvia Marziali (ITA)

=== 2026 ===
27 February 2026 2027 FIBA World Cup qualifiers – 1st round	Slovenia	99–59	Czech Republic	Koper, Slovenia
18:30 CET (UTC+1)	Scoring by quarter: 20–16, 24–20, 31–14, 24–9
	Pts: Samar 19; Rebs: Joksimović, Omić 6 Asts: Samar 7	Boxscore	Pts: Kyzlink 18; Rebs: Peterka 10; Asts: Sýkora 3	Arena: Arena Bonifika; Attendance: 2,200; Referees: Luis Castillo (ESP), Marius Ciulin (ROU), Dariusz Zapolski (POL)

1 March 2026 2027 FIBA World Cup qualifiers – 1st round	Czech Republic	84–86	Slovenia	Jihlava, Czech Republic
18:00 CET (UTC+1)	Scoring by quarter: 27–21, 27–15, 9–27, 21–23
	Pts: Kyzlink 22; Rebs: Satoranský 7 Asts: Satoranský 9	Boxscore	Pts: Prepelič 20; Rebs: Omić 11; Asts: Samar 6	Arena: Horácká Arena; Attendance: 5,321; Referees: Gvidas Gedvilas (LTU), Michał Proć (POL), Edgard Ceccarelli (FRA)

3 July 2026 2027 FIBA World Cup qualifiers – 1st round	Sweden	87–76	Czech Republic	Stockholm, Sweden
19:00 CEST (UTC+2)	Scoring by quarter: 34–16, 27–19, 18–24, 8–17
	Pts: Larsson 19; Rebs: Klintman 12; Asts: Borg, Pantzar 5	Boxscore	Pts: Sehnal 20; Rebs: Peterka 8 Asts: Sehnal 7	Arena: Hovet; Attendance: 9,000; Referees: Gatis Saliņš (LAT), Geert Jacobs (BEL), Ilias Karapanos (GRE)

6 July 2026 2027 FIBA World Cup qualifiers – 1st round	Czech Republic	75–73	Estonia	Brno, Czech Republic
17:00 CEST (UTC+2)	Scoring by quarter: 24–20, 17–17, 11–16, 23–20
	Pts: Sehnal 15; Rebs: Peterka 7 Asts: Sehnal 8	Boxscore	Pts: Kotsar, Vaaks 19; Rebs: Kotsar 9 Asts: Vaaks 5	Arena: Starez Aréna Vodova; Attendance: 2,913; Referees: Yohan Rosso (FRA), Georgios Poursanidis (GRE), Roko Hordov (CRO)

27 August 2026 EuroBasket 2029 pre-qualifiers – 2nd round	Belgium	92–81	Czech Republic	Ostend, Belgium
20:30 CEST (UTC+2)	Scoring by quarter: 24–13, 21–20, 25–19, 22–29
	Pts: Kesteloot 22; Rebs: Guisse 9 Asts: Van Den Eynde 11	Boxscore	Pts: Bálint 20; Rebs: Zídek 6 Asts: Sehnal 7	Arena: COREtec Dôme; Attendance: 644; Referees: Dariusz Zapolski (POL), Ilias Karapanos (GRE), Jānis Rozenbergs (LAT)

30 August 2026 EuroBasket 2029 pre-qualifiers – 2nd round	Czech Republic	108–97(OT)	Norway	Prague, Czech Republic
17:30 CEST (UTC+2)	Scoring by quarter: 25–23, 32–17, 9–22, 24–28, Overtime: 18–7
	Pts: Peterka 22; Rebs: Svoboda 8 Asts: Sehnal 13	Boxscore	Pts: Frey 31; Rebs: Ndow 8 Asts: Espe, Frey 6	Arena: Královka Arena; Attendance: 1,652; Referees: Blaž Zupančič (SVN), Tomasz Łangowski (POL), Branimir Galić (CRO)

29 November 2026 EuroBasket 2029 pre-qualifiers – 2nd round	Czech Republic	vs.	Belgium	Prague, Czech Republic
17:45 CET (UTC+1)
		Boxscore		Arena: Královka Arena

=== 2027 ===
25 February 2027 EuroBasket 2029 pre-qualifiers – 2nd round	Norway	vs.	Czech Republic	Norway
--:-- CET (UTC+1)
		Boxscore

== Team ==
=== Current roster ===
Roster for the EuroBasket 2029 Pre-Qualifiers matches on 27 and 30 August 2026 against Belgium and Norway.

Czech Republic men's national basketball team roster
Players
Coaches

Pos.	No.	Name	Age – Date of birth	Height	Club	Ctr.
SG	4	Lukáš Smažak	18 – 8 September 2007	1.90 m (6 ft 3 in)	Frankfurt	(Germany)
C	5	Jan Zídek	26 – 13 December 1999	2.04 m (6 ft 8 in)	Ourense	(Spain)
G/F	6	Patrick Samoura	25 – 15 November 2000	1.98 m (6 ft 6 in)	Nymburk	(Czech Republic)
PG	10	Vojtěch Sýkora	24 – 18 October 2001	1.88 m (6 ft 2 in)	Sršni Písek	(Czech Republic)
F	12	Matej Svoboda	29 – 22 September 1996	2.00 m (6 ft 7 in)	Nymburk	(Czech Republic)
C	15	Martin Peterka	31 – 12 January 1995	2.03 m (6 ft 8 in)	MKS Dąbrowa Górnicza	(Poland)
PG	19	Ondřej Sehnal	28 – 10 October 1997	1.90 m (6 ft 3 in)	Nymburk	(Czech Republic)
F/C	22	Luboš Kovář	25 – 10 November 2000	2.03 m (6 ft 8 in)	Pardubice	(Czech Republic)
F/C	31	Martin Kříž	33 – 17 June 1993	2.01 m (6 ft 7 in)	Nymburk	(Czech Republic)
G	32	Richard Bálint	23 – 8 November 2002	1.92 m (6 ft 4 in)	Bamberg	(Germany)
PF	71	Martin Svoboda	24 – 21 December 2001	2.02 m (6 ft 8 in)	Sršni Písek	(Czech Republic)
SG	77	Tomáš Kyzlink	33 – 18 June 1993	1.95 m (6 ft 5 in)	Jilin Northeast Tigers	(China)

Head coach

- (Czech Republic) Luboš Bartoň

Assistant coach(es)

- (Spain) Salvador Camps
- (Czech Republic) Jan Pavlík

Legend

- (C) Team captain
- Club – describes last
  club before the competition
- Age – describes age
  on 27 August 2026

=== Depth chart ===
Pos.	Starting 5	Bench 1	Bench 2
C	Jan Veselý	James Karnik	Martin Svoboda
PF	Martin Peterka	Jan Zídek	Martin Kříž
SF	Vojtěch Hruban	Tomáš Kyzlink	Patrick Samoura
SG	Vít Krejčí	Richard Bálint	František Rylich
PG	Tomáš Satoranský	Ondřej Sehnal	Petr Křivánek

== Head coach history ==
- (Czech Republic) Zdeněk Hummel – (1993–2000)
- (Czech Republic) Michal Ježdík – (2001–2006)
- (Czech Republic) Zdeněk Hummel – (2006–2007)
- (Czech Republic) Michal Ježdík – (2008–2009)
- (Czech Republic) Pavel Budinský – (2010–2013)
- (Israel) / (Czech Republic) Ronen Ginzburg – (2013–2023)
- (Spain) Diego Ocampo – (2023–2025)
- (Czech Republic) Luboš Bartoň – (2025–present)

== Past rosters ==
1999 EuroBasket: finished 12th among 16 teams

4 Petr Czudek, 5 Petr Welsch, 6 Vladan Vahala, 7 Marek Stuchlý, 8 Jiří Welsch, 9 David Klapetek, 10 Jiří Okáč, 11 Luboš Bartoň,
12 Petr Treml, 13 Martin Ides, 14 Kamil Novák, 15 Pavel Bečka (Coach: Zdeněk Hummel)

2007 EuroBasket: finished 15th among 16 teams

4 Štěpán Vrubl, 5 Pavel Beneš, 6 Maurice Whitfield, 7 Michal Křemen, 8 Lukáš Kraus, 9 Jiří Welsch, 10 Ladislav Sokolovský,
11 Luboš Bartoň, 12 Radek Nečas, 13 Petr Benda, 14 Jakub Houška, 15 Ondřej Starosta (Coach: Zdeněk Hummel)

2013 EuroBasket: finished 14th among 24 teams

4 Petr Benda (C), 5 Ondřej Balvín 6 Pavel Pumprla, 7 Vojtěch Hruban, 8 Tomáš Satoranský, 9 Jiří Welsch, 10 Pavel Houška,
11 Luboš Bartoň, 12 David Jelínek, 13 Jakub Kudláček, 14 Kamil Švrdlík, 15 Jan Veselý (Coach: Pavel Budínský)

2015 EuroBasket: finished 7th among 24 teams

4 Petr Benda, 5 Patrik Auda, 6 Pavel Pumprla, 7 Vojtěch Hruban, 8 Tomáš Satoranský (C), 9 Jiří Welsch, 10 Pavel Houška,
11 Luboš Bartoň, 12 David Jelínek, 13 Jakub Šiřina, 14 Blake Schilb, 24 Jan Veselý (Coach: Ronen Ginzburg)

2017 EuroBasket: finished 20th among 24 teams

1 Patrik Auda, 7 Vojtěch Hruban, 8 Tomáš Satoranský (C), 9 Jiří Welsch, 11 Lukáš Palyza, 13 Jakub Šiřina, 14 Kamil Švrdlík,
15 Martin Peterka, 17 Jaromir Bohačík, 23 Adam Pecháček, 31 Martin Kříž, 71 Tomáš Kyzlink (Coach: Ronen Ginzburg)

2019 FIBA World Cup: finished 6th among 32 teams

1 Patrik Auda, 4 Tomáš Vyoral, 6 Pavel Pumprla, 7 Vojtěch Hruban, 8 Tomáš Satoranský (C), 11 Blake Schilb, 12 Ondřej Balvín,
13 Jakub Šiřina, 15 Martin Peterka, 17 Jaromír Bohačík, 23 Lukáš Palyza, 31 Martin Kříž (Coach: Ronen Ginzburg)

2020 Olympic Games: finished 9th among 12 teams

1 Patrik Auda, 4 Tomáš Vyoral, 8 Tomáš Satoranský (C), 11 Blake Schilb, 12 Ondřej Balvín, 13 Jakub Šiřina, 15 Martin Peterka,
17 Jaromír Bohačík, 19 Ondřej Sehnal, 23 Lukáš Palyza, 24 Jan Veselý, 25 David Jelínek (Coach: Ronen Ginzburg)

2022 EuroBasket: finished 16th among 24 teams

1 Patrik Auda, 7 Vojtěch Hruban, 8 Tomáš Satoranský (C), 12 Ondřej Balvín, 15 Martin Peterka, 17 Jaromír Bohačík, 19 Ondřej Sehnal,
24 Jan Veselý, 25 David Jelínek, 27 Vít Krejčí, 31 Martin Kříž, 77 Tomáš Kyzlink (Coach: Ronen Ginzburg)

2025 EuroBasket: finished 23rd among 24 teams

5 Jan Zídek, 7 Vojtěch Hruban (C), 11 Adam Kejval, 15 Martin Peterka, 17 Jaromír Bohačík, 19 Ondřej Sehnal, 21 Petr Křivánek,
27 Vít Krejčí, 31 Martin Kříž, 32 Richard Bálint, 71 Martin Svoboda, 77 Tomáš Kyzlink (Coach: Diego Ocampo)

== See also ==
- Sport in the Czech Republic
- Czech Republic women's national basketball team
- Czech Republic men's national under-20 basketball team
- Czech Republic men's national under-19 basketball team
- Czech Republic men's national under-17 basketball team
- Czechoslovakia men's national basketball team
- Basketball in the Czech Republic
