= Tristan Vukčević =

Serbian basketball player (born 2003)

Tristan Vukčević Тристан Вукчевић
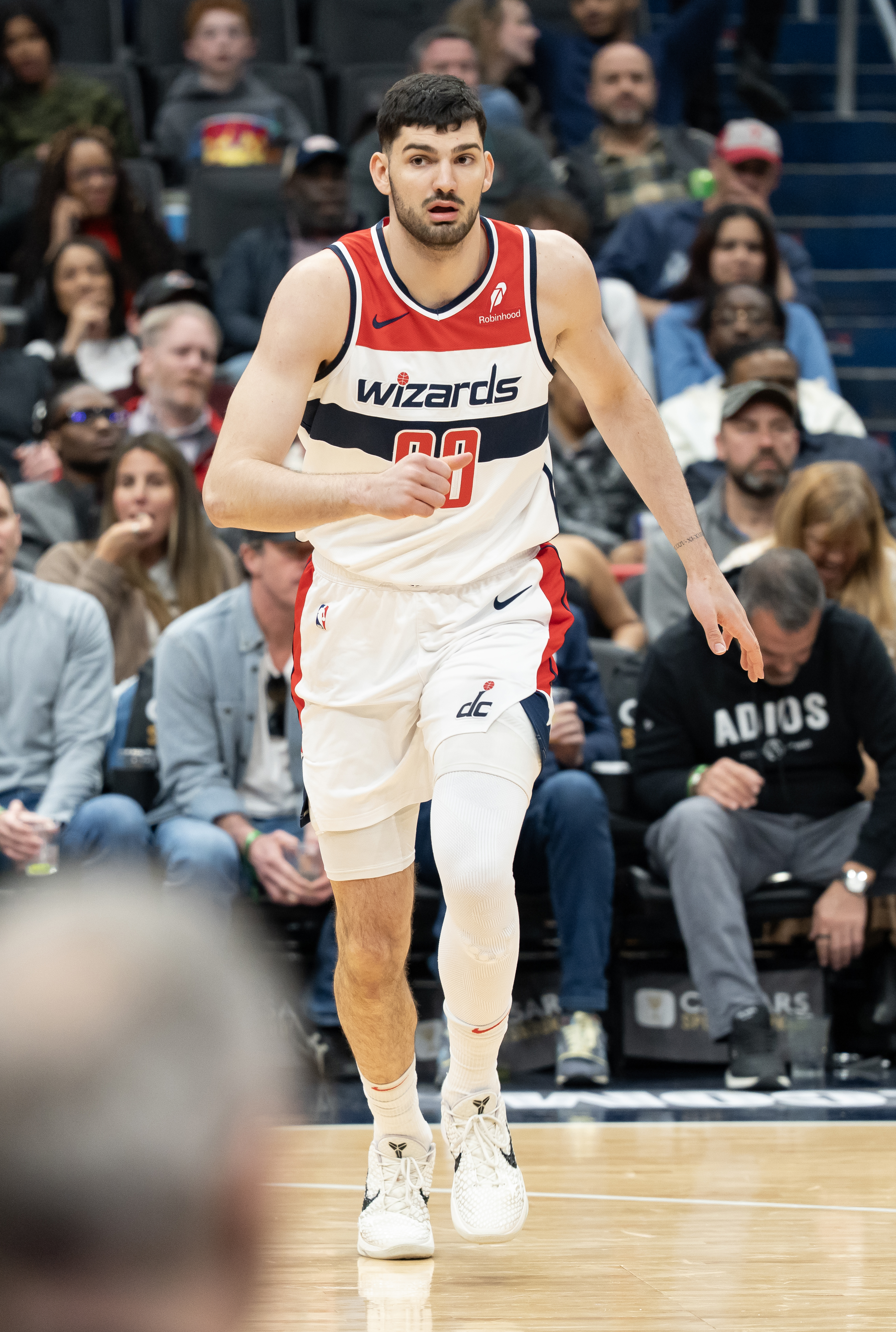
- Vukčević with the Washington Wizards in 2025

No. 00 – Washington Wizards
- Position: Power forward
- League: NBA

Personal information
- Born: 11 March 2003 (age 23) Siena, Italy
- Listed height: 7 ft 0 in (2.13 m)
- Listed weight: 220 lb (100 kg)

Career information
- NBA draft: 2023: 2nd round, 42nd overall pick
- Drafted by: Washington Wizards
- Playing career: 2020–present

Career history
- 2019–2022: Real Madrid
- 2019–2022: →Real Madrid B
- 2022–2024: Partizan
- 2024–present: Washington Wizards
- 2024–2026: →Capital City Go-Go

Career highlights
- ABA League champion (2023); Spanish Supercup winner (2021)
- Stats at NBA.com
- Stats at Basketball Reference

Tristan Tsalikis Vukčević (Serbian Cyrillic: Тристан Цаликис Вукчевић, Greek: Τριστάν Τσαλίκης-Βούκτσεβιτς, romanized: Tristan Tsalikis-Vouktsevits; born 11 March 2003) is a Serbian and Greek professional basketball player for the Washington Wizards of the National Basketball Association (NBA). He also represents the Serbian national team.

== Early life ==
Vukčević is the son of Jade (née Čičak) and Dušan Vukčević. (Note: His father added the name Tsalikis to his family name when he obtained a Greek citizenship.) He was born in Siena, Italy as his father was playing for Montepaschi Siena. His father is a retired Bosnia-born Serbian professional basketball player who played for Crvena zvezda, Olympiacos, Real Madrid, Olimpia Milano, Virtus Bologna and others during his playing career as well as represented Serbia and Montenegro national team internationally. His mother is a Greek-based Swedish businesswoman and former swimwear model. His mother's parents emigrated to Sweden from the former Yugoslavia. Vukčević holds Serbian and Greek passports through his father, and a Swedish passport through his mother.

Vukčević grew up in Italy, where his father played professionally. Following Dušan's retirement, the family moved back to Athens, Greece. He started to play basketball for the youth system of his father's former club, Olympiacos. In 2018, Vukčević joined the U16 team of Spanish club Real Madrid, another father's former club. Vukčević won the Munich Tournament for the 2019–20 Euroleague NGT season with U18 Real Madrid. Over four tournament games, he averaged 16 points, 4.8 rebounds and 1.3 assists per game. Afterward, the Final Tournament was canceled due to the COVID-19 pandemic.

== Professional career ==
=== Real Madrid (2019–2022) ===
On 2 September 2020, Vukčević made his pre-season debut for Real Madrid in a 68–66 win over Coosur Real Betis recording 8 points. On 11 October, he made his professional debut in a 90–65 win over Herbalife Gran Canaria recording 2 points and 2 rebounds in 4 minutes.

=== Partizan Belgrade (2022–2024) ===
On 27 January 2022, Vukčević signed a multi-year contract with Partizan of the ABA League. In 2022–23 season, he won the ABA League championship title with Partizan. Over 22 ABA League games, he averaged 8.1 points and 3.2 rebounds on 58% shooting from the field. In the EuroLeague, he had a more limited role within the team.

During the 2023–24 season, Vukčević averaged 4.2 points and 2.3 rebounds over 12 EuroLeague games. In ABA League, he appeared in 14 games, averaging 10.9 points and 3.6 rebounds on 54.4% shooting from the field.

On 13 March 2024, Vukčević parted ways with Partizan Belgrade to pursue his NBA career. During his three seasons at the club, Vukčević played 75 games and scored 453 points along with 198 rebounds and 48 assists.

=== Washington Wizards / Capital City Go-Go (2024–present) ===
Vukčević had a strong showing at the 2023 NBA draft combine, scoring 21 points in 17 minutes in the lone game he played. He was subsequently selected with the 42nd overall pick by the Washington Wizards in the 2023 NBA draft.

On 14 March 2024, Vukčević signed with the Wizards. He managed to play in 10 NBA regular-season games until the end of the season, averaging 8.5 points and 3.6 rebounds per game. On 3 July, he signed a two-way contract with Washington.

Vukčević made 35 appearances (one start) for the 2024–25 NBA season, averaging 9.4 points, 3.7 rebounds and 1.1 assists.

On 10 July 2025, Vukčević re-signed with Washington on another two-way contract. On 21 February 2026, the Wizards signed Vukčević to a three-year, $9 million standard contract.

== National team career ==
Due to his father's background, Vukčević is eligible to represent Greece, Bosnia and Herzegovina, or Serbia internationally, while due to his mother's background he is eligible to represent Sweden. Also, he is eligible to represent Italy or Spain. According to his father in 2022, Vukčević decided to play for Serbia internationally. On 28 July 2025, Vukčević was selected to the preliminary squad of the Serbian team for EuroBasket 2025.

== Career statistics ==
Legend
GP	Games played	GS	Games started	MPG	Minutes per game
FG%	Field-goal percentage	3P%	3-point field-goal percentage	FT%	Free-throw percentage
RPG	Rebounds per game	APG	Assists per game	SPG	Steals per game
BPG	Blocks per game	PPG	Points per game	PIR	Performance index rating
**Bold**	Career high

=== NBA ===
Year	Team	GP	GS	MPG	FG%	3P%	FT%	RPG	APG	SPG	BPG	PPG
2023–24	Washington	10	4	**15.3**	.433	.278	.773	3.6	**1.3**	**.5**	**.7**	8.5
2024–25	Washington	35	1	14.7	**.496**	**.373**	.776	**3.7**	1.1	.3	**.7**	**9.4**
2025–26	Washington	**49**	**12**	13.7	.479	.347	**.784**	3.0	1.1	**.5**	**.7**	9.0
Career		94	17	14.2	.481	.348	.780	3.3	1.1	.4	.7	9.1

=== EuroLeague ===
Year	Team	GP	GS	MPG	FG%	3P%	FT%	RPG	APG	SPG	BPG	PPG	PIR
2020–21	Real Madrid	3	1	9.2	.375	.000	**1.000**	1.7	.0	.0	.3	2.3	-1.0
2021–22	Real Madrid	9	1	6.4	.412	.333	.500	1.2	.2	.0	.2	2.1	1.6
2022–23	Partizan	**13**	2	6.4	.300	.222	**1.000**	1.2	**.5**	**.3**	.2	1.2	.1
2023–24	Partizan	12	**4**	**9.3**	**.483**	**.400**	.941	**2.3**	**.5**	.2	**.4**	**4.2**	**5.1**
Career		37	8	7.7	.405	.297	.870	1.6	.4	.2	.3	2.5	2.0

== See also ==
- List of NBA drafted players from Serbia
- List of Serbian NBA players
