= Tomáš Vyoral =

Czech basketball player

No. 4 – JIP Pardubice
- Position: Point guard
- League: NBL; Champions League

Personal information
- Born: 28 September 1992 (age 34) Weissenfels, Germany
- Listed height: 6 ft 3 in (1.91 m)
- Listed weight: 180 lb (82 kg)

Career information
- NBA draft: 2014: undrafted
- Playing career: 2009–present

Career history
- 2009–2010: Basket Poděbrady
- 2010: USK Praha
- 2011–2012: ERA Nymburk
- 2012–2013: BC Kolín
- 2013–2016: BK Děčín
- 2016–2019: ERA Nymburk
- 2019–present: JIP Pardubice

Tomáš Vyoral (born 28 September 1992) is a Czech basketball player for JIP Pardubice of the Czech Republic National Basketball League (NBL) and the Champions League. He also represents the Czech Republic national team.

== Professional career ==
Vyoral started his career in 2009 at Basket Poděbrady where he averaged 5.4 points, 2.4 rebounds and 1.7 assists. He moved to USK Praha where he averaged 7.5 points, 2.2 rebounds and 1.2 assists. He signed with ERA Nymburk in 2011, during the 2011–12 season, Vyoral averaged 2.31 points, 1.1 rebounds and 0.75 assist in all competitions he participated in.

Vyoral moved to BC Kolín for the 2012–13 season, where he posted averages of 8.36 points, 1.32 rebounds and 0.79 assists. In the 2013–14 season, he moved to BK Děčín where he averaged 8.36 points, 3.02 rebounds and 3.38 assists. In the 2014–15 season, he averaged 11 points, 3.3 rebounds and 3.9 assists. In the 2015–16 season, he averaged 13.8 points, 3.9 rebounds and 4.3 assists.

For the 2016–17 season, Vyoral moved back to ERA Nymburk where he averaged 12.4 points, 2.7 rebounds and 3.3 assists. In the 2017–18 season, he averaged 8.2 points, 3.5 rebounds and 4.1 assists. During the 2018–19 season, he averaged 6.9 points, 2.7 rebounds and 3.9 assists. Vyoral signed with JIP Pardubice for the 2019–20 season.

== National team career ==
Vyoral represented the Czech national team at the 2019 FIBA World Cup.
