= Martin Kříž =

Czech basketball player

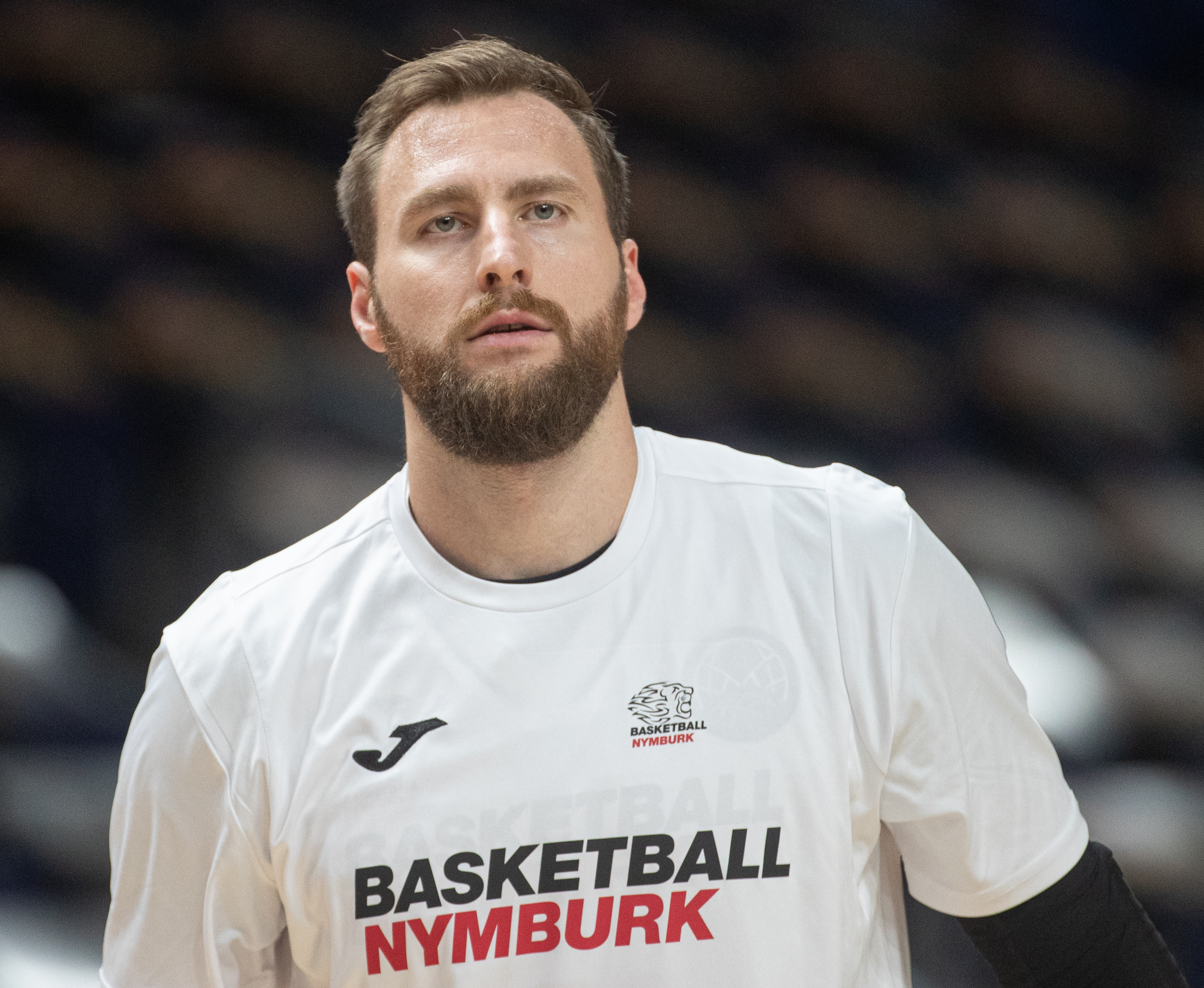
- Kříž in 2025

No. 31 – ERA Nymburk
- Position: Power forward / center
- League: NBL

Personal information
- Born: 17 June 1993 (age 33) Pardubice, Czech Republic
- Listed height: 6 ft 7 in (2.01 m)
- Listed weight: 240 lb (109 kg)

Career information
- NBA draft: 2015: undrafted
- Playing career: 2009–present

Career history
- 2009–2010: Pardubice
- 2010–2011: USK Praha
- 2011–present: Nymburk

Career highlights
- 10× Czech NBL champion (2012–2021); 8× Czech Cup winner (2012–2014, 2017–2021)

Martin Kříž (born 17 June 1993) is a Czech professional basketball player for ERA Basketball Nymburk of the Czech Republic National Basketball League (NBL). He also represents the senior Czech Republic national team.

== Professional career ==
During his pro career, Kříž has won ten Czech NBL national league championships, and eight Czech Cups.

== National team career ==
Kříž represented the senior Czech national team at the 2016 Belgrade FIBA World Olympic Qualifying Tournament, the 2017 EuroBasket, and the 2019 FIBA World Cup.
