= Lukáš Palyza =

Czech basketball player

Personal information
- Born: 10 November 1989 (age 36) Ostrava, Czechoslovakia
- Listed height: 6 ft 8 in (2.03 m)
- Listed weight: 210 lb (95 kg)

Career information
- Playing career: 2010–present
- Position: Small forward

Career history
- 2010–2011: NH Ostrava
- 2011–2014: Nymburk
- 2014–2015: Bayreuth
- 2015–2016: Prostějov
- 2016–2017: Děčín
- 2017–2018: GTK Gliwice
- 2018–2020: Olomoucko
- 2020–2023: Nymburk
- 2023–2024: Caledonia Gladiators
- 2025: Álftanes

Career highlights
- 5× Czech Republic League champion (2012–2014, 2021, 2022)

Lukáš Palyza (born 10 November 1989) is a Czech professional basketball player. He also represents the Czech Republic national team.

In February 2025, he signed with Álftanes of the Icelandic Úrvalsdeild karla.

== National team career ==
Palyza represented the Czech Republic national team at the EuroBasket 2017, and the 2019 FIBA World Cup.
