= Zdeněk Hummel =

Czech basketball player and coach (1947–2026)

Zdeněk Hummel (12 January 1947 – 10 March 2026) was a Czech basketball player and coach. He was a guard for NHKG Ostrava in the first division Czech Republic basketball league from 2009 to 2013. He also played for Czechoslovakia national team. He was also the team's assistant coach.

Hummel started playing for VŠ Prague club, his first club, which won the league in 1966. He was also part of the team which became vice champions in 1967.

Hummel died at Ostrava University Hospital on 10 March 2026, at the age of 79.
