= Jan Zídek =

Czech basketball player

Club Ourense Baloncesto
- Position: Center / Power forward
- League: Primera FEB

Personal information
- Born: 13 December 1999 (age 26) Prague, Czech Republic
- Listed height: 2.04 m (6 ft 8 in)
- Listed weight: 239 lb (108 kg)

Career information
- High school: Gymnázium Oty Pavla
- College: Pepperdine Waves (2019–2023); Chattanooga Mocs (2023–2024)
- Playing career: 2024–present

Career history
- 2024–2025: Sant Antoni
- 2025–2026: CB Tizona
- 2026–present: Ourense

Jan Zídek (born 13 December 1999) is a Czech professional basketball player who plays as a center or power forward for Ourense in Spain's Primera FEB. He is also a member of the Czech Republic national team.

== Early life and development ==
Zídek was born on 13 December 1999 in Prague, Czech Republic. He grew up in Prague, where he played for the youth academy of USK Praha and later debuted with the club in the Czech NBL. He also competed for BK Wolves Radotín, winning the Czech second division in 2019. He graduated from Gymnázium Oty Pavla in 2019.

== College career ==
In 2019, Zídek moved to the United States to play for the Pepperdine Waves in the West Coast Conference. During his four seasons at Pepperdine, he became a reliable scorer and outside shooter.

For the 2023–24 season, he transferred to the Chattanooga Mocs in the Southern Conference (SoCon), where he averaged 11.9 points, 3.4 rebounds, and 1.2 assists per game. He was named the SoCon Sixth Man of the Year.

== Professional career ==
In July 2024, Zídek signed with Club Bàsquet Sant Antoni in Spain's Segunda FEB. One year later, he moved up to CB Tizona of the Primera FEB. On May 18, 2026, he signed for Ourense of the Primera FEB.

== International career ==
Zídek has represented the Czech Republic men's national team across youth and senior levels. In the buildup to EuroBasket 2025, he emphasized his pride in playing for his country, saying: "I don't take it for granted that I can represent [my country]. I enjoy every day with the national team, I love it!"

At the tournament, Zídek contributed minutes in the group stage for the Czech team.

== Personal ==
He is from a basketball family. His father George Zidek and grandfather Jiří Zídek Sr. also played basketball professionally.
