= Ondřej Balvín =

Czech basketball player (born 1992)

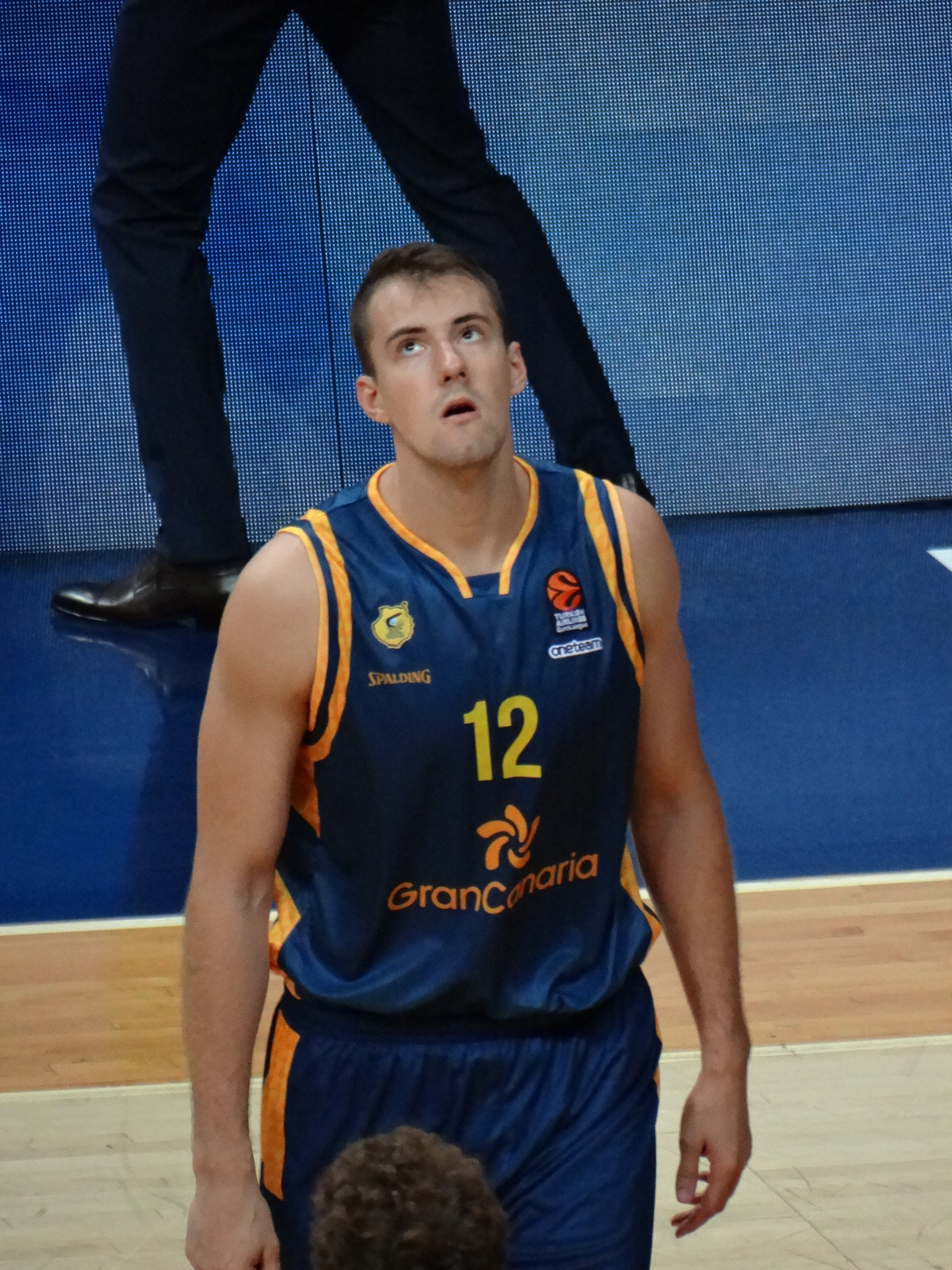
- Balvín with Gran Canaria in 2018

No. 34 – TSG GhostHawks
- Position: Center
- League: P. League+

Personal information
- Born: 20 September 1992 (age 34) Ústí nad Labem, Czechoslovakia
- Listed height: 7 ft 1.5 in (2.17 m)
- Listed weight: 243 lb (110 kg)

Career information
- NBA draft: 2014: undrafted
- Playing career: 2009–present

Career history
- 2009–2010: USK Praha
- 2010–2016: Baloncesto Sevilla
- 2016–2017: Bayern Munich
- 2017: →Estudiantes
- 2017–2019: Gran Canaria
- 2019–2021: Bilbao Basket
- 2021–2022: Gunma Crane Thunders
- 2022–2024: BC Prometey
- 2023–2025: Suke Lions
- 2024: Shanxi Loongs
- 2024–2025: Obradoiro CAB
- 2025–2026: Hong Kong Bulls
- 2026–present: TSG GhostHawks

Career highlights
- 2× Latvian–Estonian Basketball League All-Final Four Team (2023, 2024); All-EuroCup Second Team (2018); National Basketball League rebounding leader (2024); National Basketball League blocks leader (2024)
Medals
Men's basketball
Representing Czech Republic
FIBA Europe Under-16 Championship
Silver medal – second place	2008 Italy	Team

Ondřej Balvín (born 20 September 1992) is a Czech professional basketball player for the TSG GhostHawks of the Taiwanese P. League+. Standing at 7 ft 1.5 in (2.17 m), he plays at the center position. As well as Latvia, Balvin has played club basketball in the Czech Republic, Spain, Germany, and Japan.

== Professional career ==
From 2009 to 2010 he played with USK Praha. In 2010 he signed with Baloncesto Sevilla of the Spanish Liga ACB, where he played for the next six seasons.

He went undrafted in the 2014 NBA draft.

In July 2016, Balvín joined the Denver Nuggets for the 2016 NBA Summer League. On 25 July 2016 he signed a two-year contract with Bayern Munich of the German Basketball Bundesliga.

On 31 January 2017, he returned to Spain and signed with Movistar Estudiantes, on loan till the end of the 2016–17 ACB season.

On 1 July 2017, Balvín signed a one-year deal with an option for another season with Herbalife Gran Canaria of the Spanish Liga ACB.

On 23 July 2019, Balvín signed a one-year deal with RETAbet Bilbao Basket. He averaged 8.6 points and 7.3 rebounds per game. Balvin extended his contract by a season on 3 June 2020.

On 28 June 2021, Balvin signed with the Gunma Crane Thunders of the B.League for the 2021–22 season.

On 26 July 2022, Balvin signed with Prometey of the Latvian-Estonian Basketball League.

On 5 May 2023, Balvin signed a 2023–24 season contract with Prometey. On 21 June 2023, Balvin signed with Suke Lions of the National Basketball League. Balvin spent two months in China.

On 7 June 2024, Balvin signed with Suke Lions. In 2024 National Basketball League season, Balvin won rebounding and blocks title. On 28 August 2024, Balvin signed with Shanxi Loongs of the Chinese Basketball Association. On 12 November, his contract was ended. On 30 November, his joined Obradoiro CAB of the Primera FEB.

== National team career ==
Balvín played in all categories of the Czech Republic national basketball team. He joined the senior squad for the first time in 2011 for playing the EuroBasket Division B.
