= Ronen Ginzburg =

Israeli basketball coach

Ronen Ginzburg רונן גינזבורג
Personal information
- Born: 19 September 1963 (age 63) Tel Aviv, Israel

Career information
- Playing career: 1981–1995
- Position: Head coach
- Coaching career: 2000–present

Career history

Playing
- 1981–1995: Beitar Tel Aviv

Coaching
- 2000–2001: Bnei Herzliya
- 2001–2004: A.S. Ramat HaSharon
- 2004–2005: Bnei HaSharon
- 2005–2006: Maccabi Givat Shmuel
- 2006–2010: ČEZ Nymburk (assistant)
- 2011–2017: ČEZ Nymburk
- 2013–2023: Czech Republic
- 2023–2024: Prometey
- 2024–2025: Kawasaki Brave Thunders
- 2025–2026: Anwil Włocławek

Ronen "Neno" Ginzburg (Hebrew: רונן "ננו" גינזבורג; born 19 September 1963) is an Israeli-Czech professional basketball coach. He was head coach of the Czech Republic national team from November 2013 until July 2023, coaching them at the EuroBasket in 2015, 2017, and 2022, as well as the 2019 FIBA World Cup, and 2020 Summer Olympics. Born in Israel, he was granted Czech citizenship in October 2020.

== See also ==
- List of Jews in sports (non-players)
