= Vít Krejčí =

Czech basketball player (born 2000)

No. 27 – Portland Trail Blazers
- Position: Small forward / shooting guard
- League: NBA

Personal information
- Born: 19 June 2000 (age 26) Strakonice, Czech Republic
- Listed height: 6 ft 8 in (2.03 m)
- Listed weight: 215 lb (98 kg)

Career information
- NBA draft: 2020: 2nd round, 37th overall pick
- Drafted by: Washington Wizards
- Playing career: 2017–present

Career history
- 2017–2021: Zaragoza
- 2021–2022: Oklahoma City Thunder
- 2022: →Oklahoma City Blue
- 2022–2023: Atlanta Hawks
- 2022–2023: →College Park Skyhawks
- 2023: Iowa Wolves
- 2023–2026: Atlanta Hawks
- 2023–2024: →College Park Skyhawks
- 2026–present: Portland Trail Blazers

Career highlights
- ACB All-Young Players Team (2020)
- Stats at NBA.com
- Stats at Basketball Reference
Medals
Men's basketball
Representing Czech Republic
FIBA U20 European Championship B
Silver medal – second place	2019 Portugal	Team

Vít Krejčí (/ˈviːt ˌkreɪˈtʃiː/; born 19 June 2000) is a Czech professional basketball player for the Portland Trail Blazers of the National Basketball Association (NBA). He was drafted in the second round of the 2020 NBA draft.

== Early life and career ==
Krejčí was born in Strakonice, Czech Republic and played basketball for the youth academy of Sokol Pisek. At age 14, he joined Spanish basketball club, Zaragoza. In the 2016–17 season, he began playing for Anagan Olivar, the reserve team of Zaragoza, in the Liga EBA.

== Professional career ==
=== Basket Zaragoza (2017–2021) ===
On 5 March 2017, at 16 years and eight months of age, Krejčí made his professional debut for Zaragoza against Fuenlabrada. He tied with Sergi García as the second-youngest debutant in club history, behind Carlos Alocén. On 17 April 2020, Krejčí declared for the 2020 NBA draft. In the 2019–20 season, Krejčí averaged 3.2 points in 9.2 minutes per game and was named to the ACB All-Young Players Team. On 25 September 2020, he suffered a season-ending left knee injury in a game against Real Madrid.

=== Oklahoma City Thunder (2021–2022) ===
Krejčí was selected with the 37th overall pick by the Washington Wizards in the 2020 NBA draft and subsequently traded to the Oklahoma City Thunder. On 28 January 2021, he signed with the Oklahoma City Blue, the Thunder's NBA G League affiliate, where he rehabbed the ACL injury he sustained in Zaragoza.

On 2 September 2021, Krejčí signed a multi-year deal with the Thunder.

=== Atlanta Hawks (2022–2023) ===
On 27 September 2022, Krejčí was traded to the Atlanta Hawks in exchange for Maurice Harkless and draft considerations.

On 16 August 2023, Krejčí was waived by the Hawks.

=== Iowa Wolves (2023) ===
On 14 September 2023, Krejčí signed with the Minnesota Timberwolves, but was waived on 19 October. Ten days later, he joined the Iowa Wolves.

=== Second stint with Hawks (2023–2026) ===
On 22 December 2023, Krejčí signed another two-way contract with the Hawks. He made 22 appearances (14 starts) for Atlanta during the 2023–24 NBA season, averaging 6.1 points, 2.4 rebounds, and 2.3 assists.

On 12 July 2024, Krejčí signed a four-year, $10 million contract extension with the Hawks. He played in 57 games (including 16 starts) for the Hawks during the 2024–25 NBA season, averaging 7.2 points, 2.7 rebounds, and 2.6 assists.

On 10 November 2025, Krejčí scored a career-high 28 points, including a career-high eight three pointers on ten attempts, as Atlanta defeated the Los Angeles Clippers 105–102. He made 46 total appearances for the Hawks during the 2025–26 season, compiling averages of 9.0 points, 2.1 rebounds, and 1.5 assists.

=== Portland Trail Blazers (2026–present) ===
On 1 February 2026, Krejčí was traded to the Portland Trail Blazers in exchange for Duop Reath, a 2027 second round pick, and a 2030 second round pick. On November 11, 2026, he underwent surgery to repair a fracture in his left ankle which occurred during the November 4th game against the Phoenix Suns.

== Career statistics ==
Legend
GP	Games played	GS	Games started	MPG	Minutes per game
FG%	Field goal percentage	3P%	3-point field goal percentage	FT%	Free throw percentage
RPG	Rebounds per game	APG	Assists per game	SPG	Steals per game
BPG	Blocks per game	PPG	Points per game	**Bold**	Career high

=== NBA ===
==== Regular season ====
Year	Team	GP	GS	MPG	FG%	3P%	FT%	RPG	APG	SPG	BPG	PPG
2021–22	Oklahoma City	30	8	23.0	.407	.327	**.864**	**3.4**	1.9	.6	.3	6.2
2022–23	Atlanta	29	0	5.7	.405	.238	.500	.9	.6	.2	.0	1.2
2023–24	Atlanta	22	14	**24.6**	.490	.412	.833	2.4	**2.3**	.6	.3	6.1
2024–25	Atlanta	**57**	**16**	20.2	**.497**	**.437**	.711	2.7	**2.6**	.6	**.5**	7.2
2025–26	Atlanta	46	8	22.3	.464	.423	.750	2.1	1.5	**.8**	.3	**9.0**
2025–26	Portland	19	0	19.2	.405	.303	.733	2.7	1.7	.5	.3	7.2
Career		203	46	19.4	.458	.393	.754	2.4	1.8	.6	.3	6.5

==== Playoffs ====
Year	Team	GP	GS	MPG	FG%	3P%	FT%	RPG	APG	SPG	BPG	PPG
2026	Portland	4	0	4.0	.250	.000	—	.3	.5	.0	.0	.5
Career		4	0	4.0	.250	.000	—	.3	.5	.0	.0	.5

== National team career ==
Krejčí represented the Czech Republic on several occasions at the youth level. He was named to the All-Star Five of the 2019 FIBA U20 European Championship Division B in Matosinhos, Portugal after averaging 14.9 points, 5.1 rebounds and 5.1 assists, leading his team to the silver medal. In February 2019, Krejčí made his debut for the senior national team during the 2019 FIBA Basketball World Cup qualification stage.

== See also ==
- List of NBA career 3-point field goal percentage leaders
