= David Jelínek =

Czech basketball player

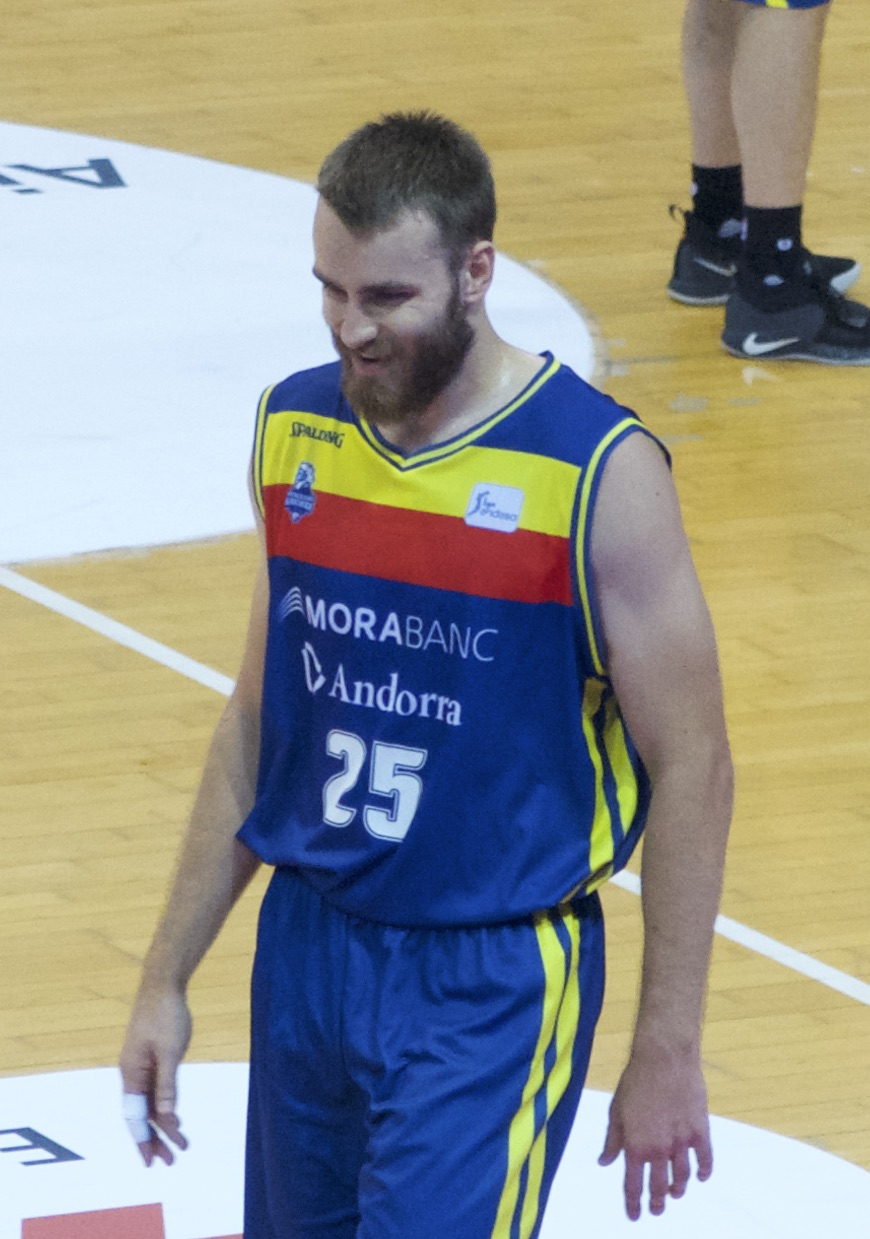
- David Jelínek, playing with Morabanc Andorra.

No. 25 – Real Betis Baloncesto
- Position: Shooting guard / small forward
- League: LEB Oro

Personal information
- Born: September 7, 1990 (age 36) Brno, Czechoslovakia
- Listed height: 6 ft 5 in (1.96 m)
- Listed weight: 200 lb (91 kg)

Career information
- NBA draft: 2012: undrafted
- Playing career: 2006–present

Career history
- 2006–2007: BBK Brno
- 2007–2012: Joventut Badalona
- 2007–2010: →Prat
- 2012–2013: Olin Edirne
- 2013–2014: Saski Baskonia
- 2014: Krasnye Krylia
- 2015: Uşak Sportif
- 2015–2016: Anwil Włocławek
- 2016–2022: Andorra
- 2022–2024: UCAM Murcia
- 2024–present: Real Betis Baloncesto

Career highlights
- All-Polish League Team (2016)

David Jelínek (born September 7, 1990) is a Czech professional basketball player for Real Betis Baloncesto of the LEB Oro. He is a 1.96 m (6 ft 5 in) tall shooting guard-small forward. He also represents the senior Czech Republic national team.

== Professional career ==
Jelínek grew up playing basketball with BBK Brno, a team in the Czech Republic. He moved to Spain for the 2007–08 season, signed by Joventut Badalona. In the summer of 2012, Jelínek signed a contract with the Turkish club Olin Edirne, and in January 2013, he left the Turkish club and signed with the Spanish club Caja Laboral, where he remained until July 2014.

In August 2014, he signed with the Russian team Krasnye Krylia. On January 2, 2015, he left Krylya and signed with Turkish club Uşak Sportif. for the rest of the season. On August 21, 2015, he signed with Polish club Anwil Włocławek, for the 2015–16 season. On July 5, 2016, he signed with MoraBanc Andorra, of the Spanish Liga ACB.

On July 10, 2022, he signed with UCAM Murcia of the Liga ACB and the Basketball Champions League.

On August 9, 2024, he signed with Real Betis Baloncesto of the LEB Oro.

== National team career ==
Jelínek is a member of the senior Czech Republic national team. He played with the Czech Republic at the 2013 EuroBasket and the 2015 EuroBasket.
