= Ondřej Sehnal =

Czech basketball player

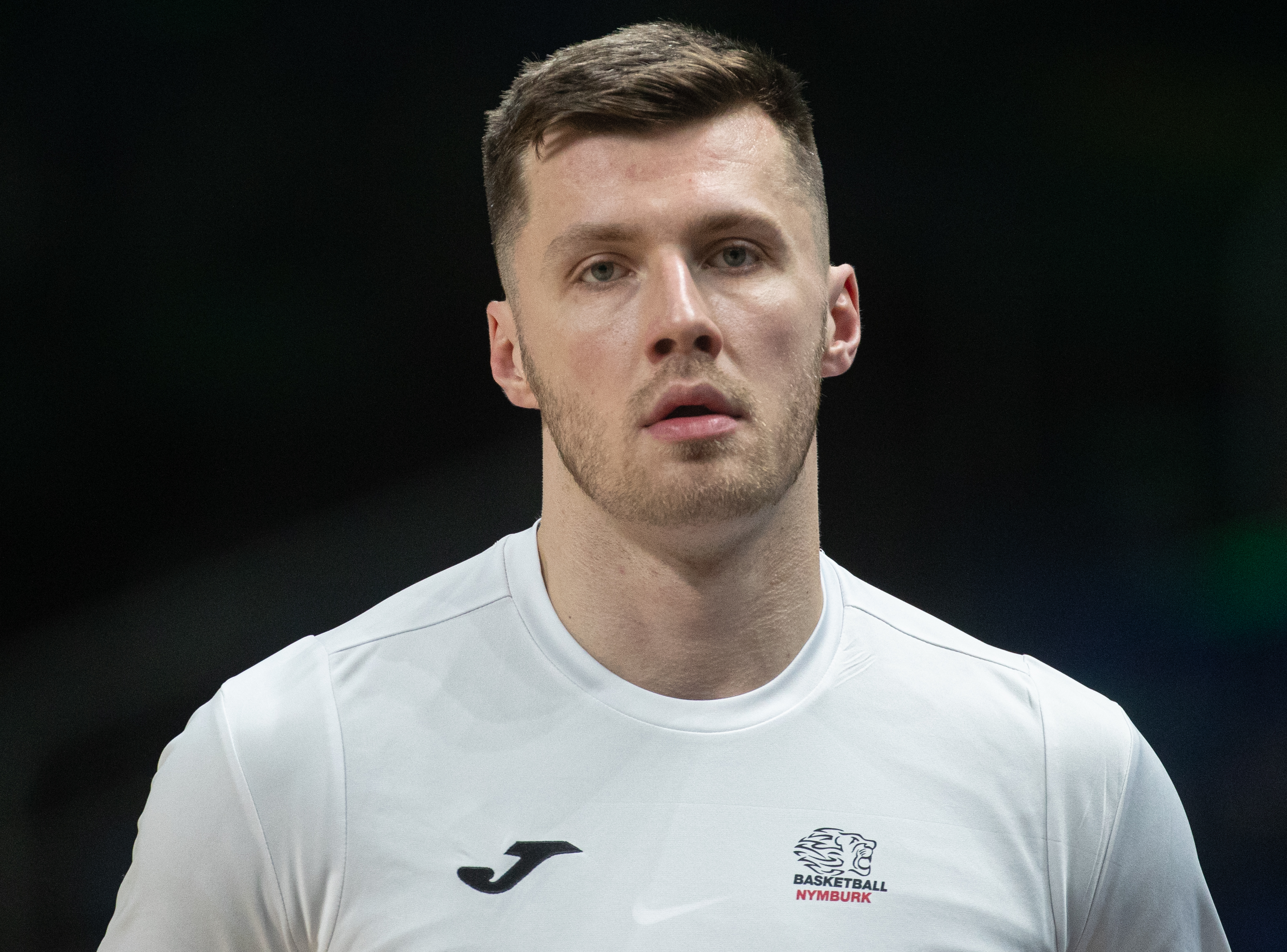
- Sehnal in 2025

No. 19 – Wilki Morskie Szczecin
- Position: Point guard
- League: PLK

Personal information
- Born: 10 October 1997 (age 29) Prague, Czech Republic
- Listed height: 1.91 m (6 ft 3 in)
- Listed weight: 209 lb (95 kg)

Career information
- Playing career: 2014–present

Career history
- 2014–2021: USK Praha
- 2021–2022: Löwen Braunschweig
- 2022–2026: Nymburk
- 2026–present: Wilki Morskie Szczecin

Ondřej Sehnal (born 10 October 1997) is a Czech professional basketball player for Wilki Morskie Szczecin of the Polish Basketball League (PLK).

== Professional career ==
Sehnal played for USK Praha of the Czech National Basketball League from 2014 to 2021.

On 9 August 2021, he has signed with Löwen Braunschweig of the Basketball Bundesliga.

On July 16, 2026, he signed with Wilki Morskie Szczecin of the Polish Basketball League (PLK).

== National team ==
Sehnal has been a member of the Czech national basketball team. In a EuroBasket 2022 qualification match against Denmark, Sehnal scored 10 points while his coach Ronen Ginzburg assigned Sehnal with special defense assignments against the opponent's top players.

== Personal life ==
Sehnal states that he grew up admiring Miloš Teodosić.
