= Patrik Auda =

Czech basketball player

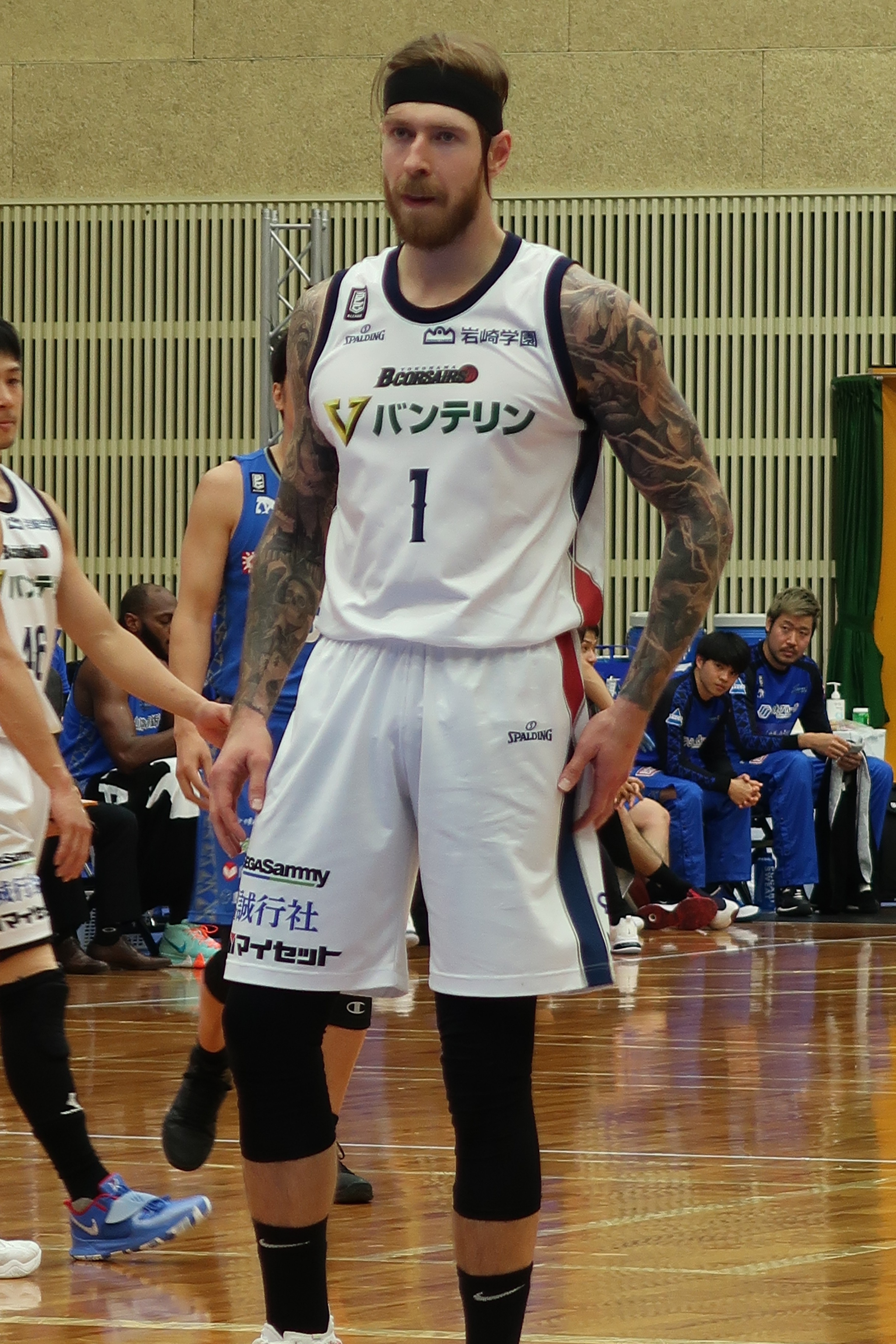
- Auda with Yokohama B-Corsairs in 2020

No. 2 – Aomori Wat's
- Position: Power forward / center
- League: B.League

Personal information
- Born: 29 August 1989 (age 37) Ivančice, Czechoslovakia
- Listed height: 2.06 m (6 ft 9 in)
- Listed weight: 107 kg (236 lb)

Career information
- College: Seton Hall (2010–2014)
- NBA draft: 2014: undrafted
- Playing career: 2014–present

Career history
- 2014–2015: Polfarmex Kutno
- 2015–2016: AZS Koszalin
- 2016–2017: Manresa
- 2017–2018: Rosa Radom
- 2018: Scandone
- 2018–2019: Pistoia
- 2019–2020: Boulazac
- 2020–2023: Yokohama B-Corsairs
- 2023–2024: Aomori Wat's
- 2024: Sun Rockers Shibuya
- 2025–present: Aomori Wat's

Patrik Auda (born 29 August 1989) is a Czech professional basketball player for the Aomori Wat's of the B.League. He also represents the Czech national team.

== Professional career ==
In May 2018, Auda signed with Scandone of the Lega Basket Serie A for 2018 LBA Playoffs.

On 29 November 2024, Auda signed with the Sun Rockers Shibuya of the B.League for 2024–25 season. On 27 December, his contract was terminated. On 10 January 2025, he signed with the Aomori Wat's.

== National team career ==
Auda has been a regular member of the senior Czech national team. He represented Czechia at the EuroBasket 2015, the EuroBasket 2017, the 2019 FIBA World Cup, the 2020 Olympics and the EuroBasket 2022.
