= Jakub Šiřina =

Czech basketball player

No. 24 – BK Opava
- Position: Point guard
- League: NBL

Personal information
- Born: 21 November 1987 (age 38) Ostrava, Czechoslovakia
- Listed height: 1.87 m (6 ft 2 in)
- Listed weight: 169 lb (77 kg)

Career information
- NBA draft: 2009: undrafted

Career history
- 2006–2008: NH Ostrava
- 2008–present: Opava

Career highlights
- Czech Republic League Final series MVP (2023)

Jakub Šiřina (born 21 November 1987) is a Czech basketball player for BK Opava of the Czech Republic National Basketball League (NBL) and the Czech Republic national team.

== National team career ==
Šiřina represented the Czech Republic at the EuroBasket in 2015 and 2017. He was also chosen to play for the team at the 2019 FIBA World Cup.
