= Jaromír Bohačík =

Czech basketball player

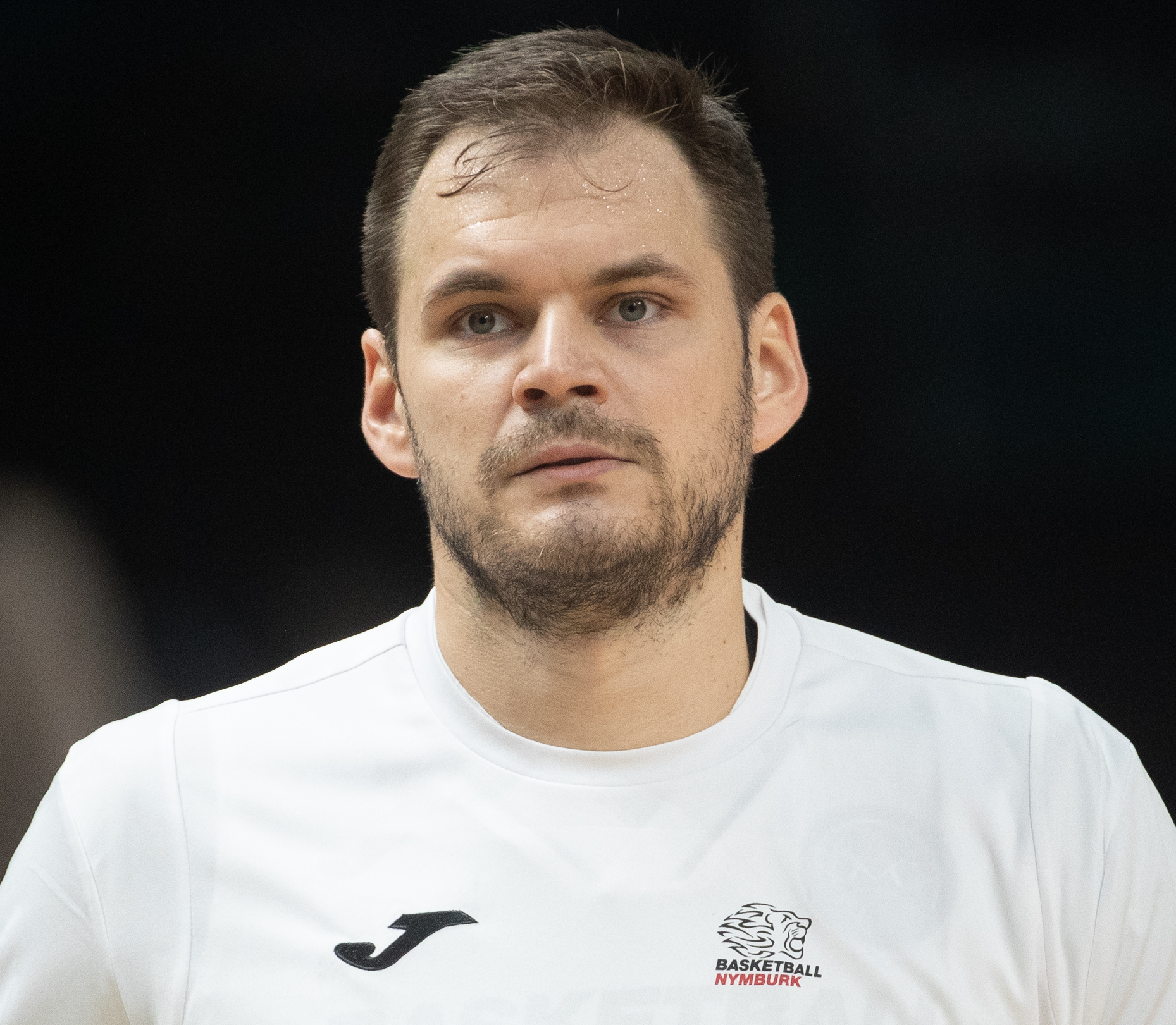
- Bohačík in 2025

No. 17 – ERA Nymburk
- Position: Shooting guard
- League: NBL

Personal information
- Born: 26 May 1992 (age 34) Ostrava, Czechoslovakia
- Listed height: 6 ft 6 in (1.98 m)
- Listed weight: 198 lb (90 kg)

Career information
- NBA draft: 2014: undrafted

Career history
- 2010–2014: Prostějov
- 2012–2013: →Brno
- 2014–2015: Leuven Bears
- 2015–2017: USK Praha
- 2017–2020: Nymburk
- 2020–2022: SIG Strasbourg
- 2022–2023: Brose Bamberg
- 2023–present: ERA Nymburk

Career highlights
- 2× Czech League champion (2018, 2019); 3x Czech Cup winner (2018, 2019, 2020)

Jaromír Bohačík (born 26 May 1992) is a Czech basketball player for ERA Nymburk of the National Basketball League. He also represents the Czech Republic national team.

== National team career ==
Bohačík represented the Czech Republic national team at the EuroBasket 2017, and the 2019 FIBA World Cup.
