= Martin Peterka =

Czech basketball player

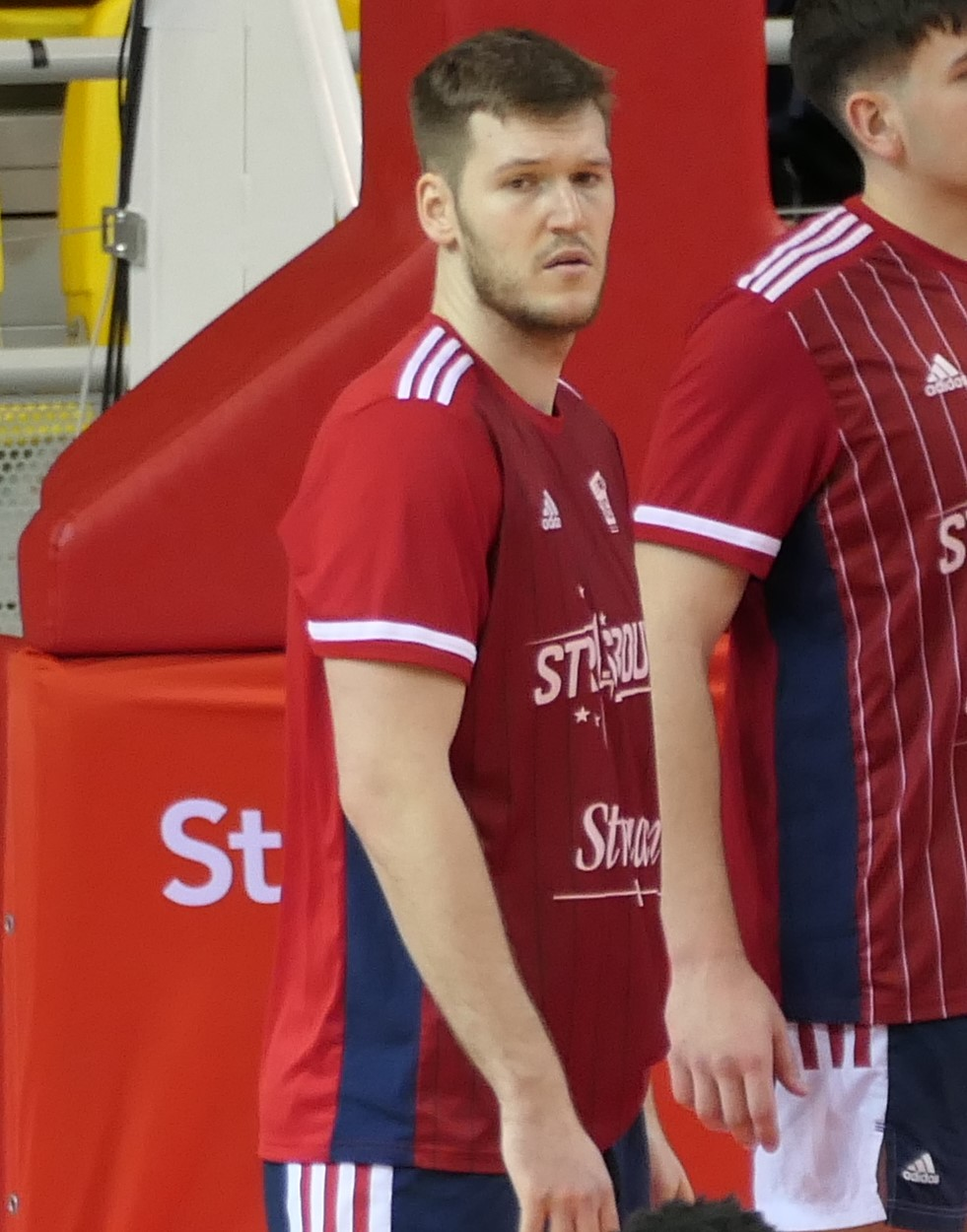
- Peterka with Strasbourg in 2023

No. 15 – MKS Dąbrowa Górnicza
- Position: Power forward
- League: PLK

Personal information
- Born: 12 January 1995 (age 31) Pardubice, Czech Republic
- Listed height: 6 ft 9 in (2.06 m)
- Listed weight: 220 lb (100 kg)

Career information
- Playing career: 2011–present

Career history
- 2011–2014: Pardubice
- 2014–2015: USK Praha
- 2015–2020: Nymburk
- 2020–2022: Löwen Braunschweig
- 2022: s.Oliver Würzburg
- 2022–2023: Merkezefendi Bld. Denizli Basket
- 2023: SIG Strasbourg
- 2023–2024: Löwen Braunschweig
- 2024–2025: Yalovaspor Basketbol
- 2025–present: MKS Dąbrowa Górnicza

Career highlights
- 2x NBL champion (2016, 2017); 2x Czech Cup champion (2017, 2018)

Martin Peterka (born 12 January 1995) is a Czech basketball player for MKS Dąbrowa Górnicza of the Polish Basketball League (PLK). He is also part of the Czech Republic national team.

== Professional career ==
On 30 June 2020 Peterka parted ways with ERA Basketball Nymburk. Peterka then signed with club Löwen Braunschweig on 6 August 2020.

On December 1, 2022, he signed with Merkezefendi Bld. Denizli Basket of the Turkish Basketball Super League (BSL).

On January 30, 2023, he signed with SIG Strasbourg of the French LNB Pro A.

On September 9, 2024, he signed with Yalovaspor Basketbol of the Basketbol Süper Ligi (BSL).

On August 14, 2025, he signed with MKS Dąbrowa Górnicza of the Polish Basketball League (PLK).

== National team career ==
Peterka represented the Czech Republic national team at the EuroBasket 2017.
