= Serbia men's national basketball team =

National sports team

Serbia
- FIBA ranking: 4 ▼1 (1 September 2026)
- Joined FIBA: 1936
- FIBA zone: FIBA Europe
- National federation: KSS
- Coach: Dušan Alimpijević
- Nickname(s): Орлови, Оrlovi (The Eagles)

Olympic Games
- Appearances: 5
- Medals: (silver) Silver: (1996, 2016); (bronze) Bronze: (2024)

FIBA World Cup
- Appearances: 7
- Medals: (gold) Gold: (1998, 2002); (silver) Silver: (2014, 2023)

EuroBasket
- Appearances: 14
- Medals: (gold) Gold: (1995, 1997, 2001); (silver) Silver: (2009, 2017); (bronze) Bronze: (1999)
| Home | Away |

First international
- FR Yugoslavia 93–87 Bulgaria (Sofia, Bulgaria; 31 May 1995)

Biggest win
- FR Yugoslavia 128–61 China (Atlanta, United States; 30 July 1996); Serbia 122–55 Cyprus (Limasol, Cyprus; 10 August 2025)

Biggest defeat
- Serbia 92–129 United States (Madrid, Spain; 14 September 2014)
Medal record
Representing FR Yugoslavia / Serbia and Montenegro / Serbia
Olympic Games
| Silver medal – second place | 1996 Atlanta | Team |
| Silver medal – second place | 2016 Rio de Janeiro | Team |
| Bronze medal – third place | 2024 Paris | Team |
FIBA World Cup
| Gold medal – first place | 1998 Greece |
| Gold medal – first place | 2002 United States |
| Silver medal – second place | 2014 Spain |
| Silver medal – second place | 2023 Philippines–Japan–Indonesia |
EuroBasket
| Gold medal – first place | 1995 Greece |
| Gold medal – first place | 1997 Spain |
| Gold medal – first place | 2001 Turkey |
| Silver medal – second place | 2009 Poland |
| Silver medal – second place | 2017 Finland–Israel–Romania–Turkey |
| Bronze medal – third place | 1999 France |
Mediterranean Games
| Silver medal – second place | 2013 Mersin | Team |
| Bronze medal – third place | 1997 Bari | Team |
Diamond Ball
| Gold medal – first place | 2004 Belgrade |
| Silver medal – second place | 2000 Hong Kong |
Stanković Cup
| Bronze medal – third place | 2008 Hangzhou |
Summer Universiade
| Gold medal – first place | 2001 Beijing |
| Gold medal – first place | 2003 Daegu |
| Gold medal – first place | 2009 Belgrade |
| Gold medal – first place | 2011 Shenzhen |
| Silver medal – second place | 1999 Palma de Mallorca |
| Silver medal – second place | 2007 Bangkok |
| Bronze medal – third place | 2005 Izmir |
| Bronze medal – third place | 2013 Kazan |

The Serbia men's national basketball team (Serbian: Кошаркашка репрезентација Србије, romanized: Košarkaška reprezentacija Srbije) represents Serbia in international men's basketball competition, and is controlled by the Basketball Federation of Serbia. Serbia is currently ranked third in the FIBA World Ranking.

From 1992 to 2003, the national team played in international tournaments under the name FR Yugoslavia, and from 2003 to 2006, under the name Serbia and Montenegro. Following Montenegro’s declaration of independence in 2006, Serbia is considered sole legal successor. The Basketball Federation of Serbia retained the place of the Basketball Federation of Serbia and Montenegro as a FIBA member, and Serbia thus officially inherited all of the preceding country's results and medals.

Serbia has often been portrayed as a basketball powerhouse. With 16 members of the FIBA Hall of Fame (second most behind USA), 5 members of the Naismith’s Hall of Fame (second most behind USA) and 20% of the 50 Greatest EuroLeague Contributors, Serbian players, coaches and administrators had and continue to have a profound effect on the development of basketball in Europe and the world. From the leader of the Silver Generation of Yugoslavian basketball (Radivoj Korać), through the most important players of the First Golden Generation (Dragan Kićanović, Dražen Dalipagić, Zoran Slavnić and Ratko Radovanović) and Second Golden Generation (Vlade Divac, Žarko Paspalj, Zoran Savić, Predrag Danilović), the successes of Serbian players continued even after the disintegration of Yugoslavia in 1991. Following its international debut in 1995, strengthened by new stars of European basketball (Aleksandar Đorđević, Dejan Bodiroga, Željko Rebrača, Miroslav Berić, Peja Stojaković and many others), the Serbian national team continued where Yugoslavia stopped by winning 7 medals from 1995 to 2002 (back to back World Championships in 1998 and 2002, 3 Eurobaskets in 1995, 1997 and 2001, silver at 1996 Olympics and bronze at 1999 Eurobasket).

The production of players continued in the 21st century with Euroleague MVPs Miloš Teodosić, Nemanja Bjelica and Vasilije Micić, along with Bogdan Bogdanović, Nenad Krstić and 3-time NBA MVP Nikola Jokić. In the 2020s, the new generations continue in the footsteps of their predecessors, winning titles and individual accolades in both NBA and Euroleague, simultaneously positioning the national team in second place in the FIBA ranking.

In addition to players, Serbian coaches have also significantly influenced the development of basketball in Europe for almost a century. From Naismith Hall of Famer Aleksandar Nikolić and Olympic champion Ranko Žeravica to multiple Euroleague champions Dušan Ivković, Svetislav Pešić and Božidar Maljković to Željko Obradović, the greatest coach in European basketball history and outside the NBA, Serbian coaches have won a record 19 Euroleague titles, 17 out of 26 Yugoslavian medals and 13 medals with the Serbian national team at the biggest international competitions (FIBA World Cup, Eurobasket and Summer Olympics).

The four “Fathers of Yugoslav basketball” and recipients of the prestigious FIBA Order of Merit are also Serbs; coach, journalist, commentator and founder of Crvena Zvezda basketball team Nebojša Popović, long-term president of the Basketball Federation of Yugoslavia Radomir Šaper, the aforementioned founder of the Serbian (and Yugoslav) coaching school Aleksandar Nikolić and Borislav Stanković, a Serb who probably had the greatest impact on the world of basketball. As the general secretary of FIBA Stanković is responsible for bridging the conflict between the NBA and FIBA. With the agreement between Stankovic and NBA commissioner David Stern, NBA players got the opportunity to play at the Olympics, while at the same time the first wave of European players went to the NBA. The agreement made basketball truly a global sport and directly opened the door for the continuation of American dominance on the international stage as well as the creation of a base of foreign players who will win 8 NBA MVP awards in a row and counting.

== History ==
=== Serbia and Montenegro ===
With the start of Yugoslav Wars in 1991, and subsequent breakup of Yugoslavia, the Yugoslavia national team was disbanded. The team consisted of players selected from the population of over 23 million people, and the basketball infrastructure was evenly distributed among the six states which formed the Socialist Federal Republic of Yugoslavia.

In 1992, FR Yugoslavia was established as the federation of the two remaining Yugoslav republics, Serbia and Montenegro. The newly established country had less than half the population of the former country. The Basketball Federation of FR Yugoslavia became the governing body of basketball for the new country. After the adoption of UNSCR 757, the national team was suspended from participating in international tournaments. Due to these sanctions and ongoing war, the national team was prevented from participating at the 1992 Summer Olympics, EuroBasket 1993 and 1994 FIBA World Cup.

==== 1995–2002: Golden generation ====
Without much sponsorship for the war-impoverished country, the national team made its comeback to the international scene at the EuroBasket 1995 in Greece, where it won the gold medal; after defeating Lithuania in the final. At the 1996 Summer Olympics, the team lost 69–95 to the United States in the gold-medal game. After the defeat, the national team would go on to claim the gold medal in their next two international competitions, EuroBasket 1997 and the 1998 FIBA World Cup; while winning the bronze medal at EuroBasket 1999 and reclaiming gold once again at the EuroBasket 2001.

One of the most notable wins for the Yugoslavia national team came in the quarter-finals of the 2002 FIBA World Cup, where the host nation of the tournament, the United States was eliminated 81–78. The significance of the win was tremendous for the Serbian people in general, as the public in Serbia perceived the United States political leadership responsible for the breakup of Yugoslavia, and destruction of the country's infrastructure; as well as civil victims during the 1999 NATO bombing of Yugoslavia. Thereafter, the Yugoslavia national team went on to win the competition, by defeating New Zealand in the semi-finals and Argentina in the final 84–77 in OT to win the gold medal.

==== 2003–2006: Underwhelming results ====
In 2002, FR Yugoslavia consisted of the states of Serbia and Montenegro. The merged nations came to a new agreement regarding continued co-operation, which, among other changes, promised the end of the name Yugoslavia. On 4 February 2003, the federal assembly of Yugoslavia created a loose state union—the State Union of Serbia and Montenegro. The following years were underwhelming as the national team failed to make the podium at international tournaments, after decades of winning medals.

At the EuroBasket 2003, the team came in sixth place, but due to their world champion status, were automatically qualified for the 2004 Summer Olympics in Greece. Entering 2004, the national team participated in the less important Diamond Ball tournament, prior to the 2004 Olympic Games where they won the gold medal. Although the team was unable to carry over the momentum heading into the Olympics, and were eliminated in the group stage with a (1–4) record, finishing in 11th place.

After two consecutive tournament disappointments, hopes of getting back on the podium returned for the EuroBasket 2005 where Serbia and Montenegro was the host nation. Heading into the tournament, Željko Obradović was brought back for a second stint as head coach of the national team. However, they were eliminated in the play-off stage by France 74–71, and finished in ninth place. After the tournament, Obradović stepped down, and blamed a bad atmosphere among the team's star players for the failure. The team then participated at the 2006 FIBA World Cup on a wild card, due to the results in the past on the initiative by FIBA prominent administrator Borislav Stanković. Although the national team of Serbia and Montenegro came up short once again, with another ninth-place finish.

On 21 May 2006, Montenegrins voted in an independence referendum, with 55.5% supporting independence. The subsequent Montenegrin proclamation of independence in June 2006 and the Serbian proclamation of independence on 5 June ended the State Union of Serbia and Montenegro and thus the last remaining vestiges of the former Yugoslavia.

=== Serbia ===
==== 2006–2009 ====
Following the dissolution of the state union of Serbia and Montenegro, the national team participated at the EuroBasket 2007. There, the team finished the competition failing to make it out of the group stage after three close losses. The result failed to qualify the team for the 2008 Summer Olympics, which was their first time missing the Olympic tournament after missing it in 1992 due to suspension.

In December 2007, the legendary Dušan Ivković hinted that he would take the helm as head coach of the national team.

==== 2009–2013: Flashes of old glory ====
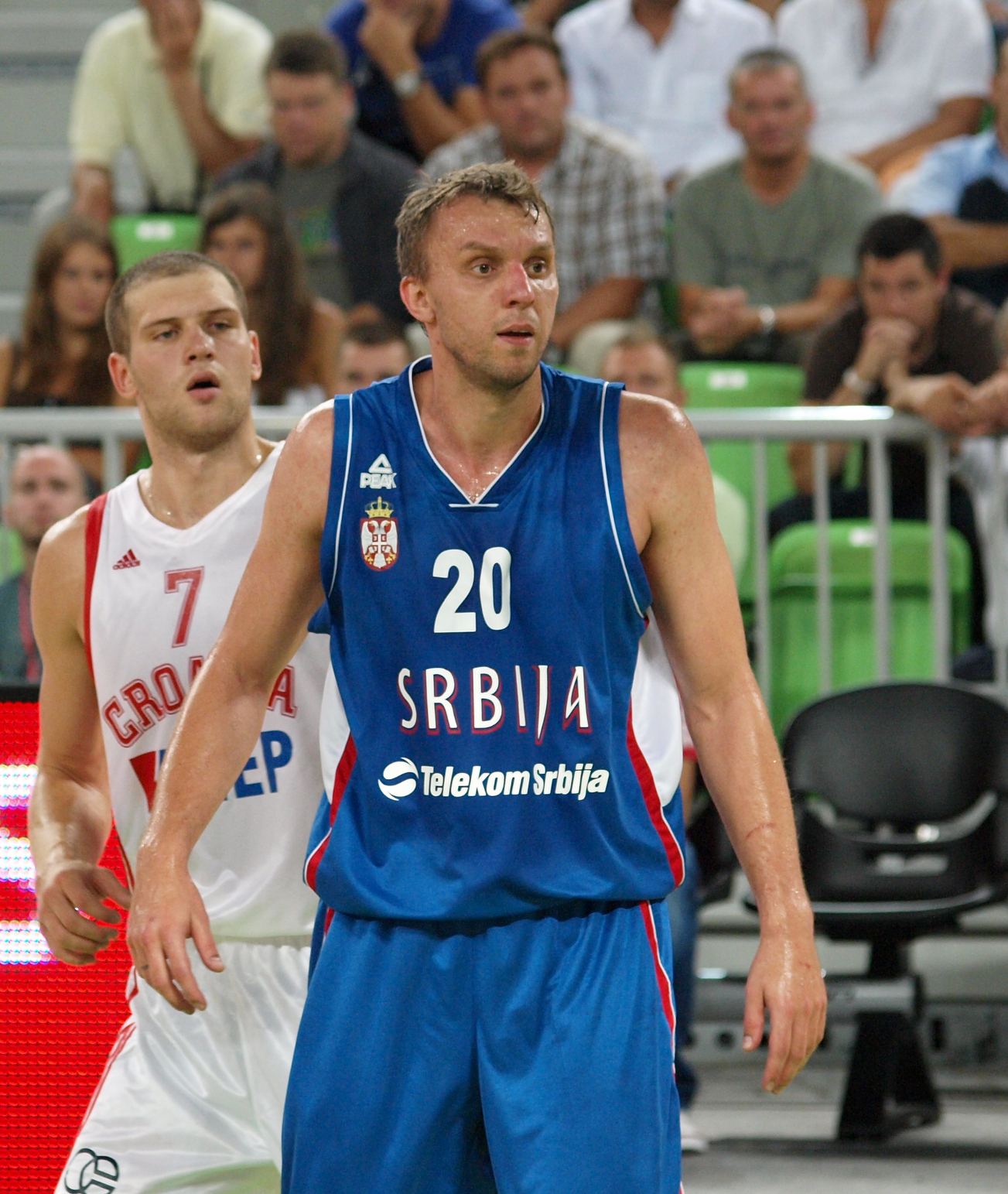
Duško Savanović in 2011

Under Ivković's coaching, a new generation of players led by Nenad Krstić and Miloš Teodosić returned some of the old glory by taking the silver medal at Eurobasket 2009. At the 2010 FIBA World Cup, after narrowly defeating Croatia in the Round of 16, Miloš Teodosić hit a deep three-point shot to upset the favourites of the tournament Spain in the quarter-finals. Entering the semis, Serbia would come up short, after a controversial referee's error to the tournament's host Turkey 83–82. With the youngest team in the competition, Serbia eventually finished in fourth place after losing to Lithuania 99–88 in the bronze-medal game.

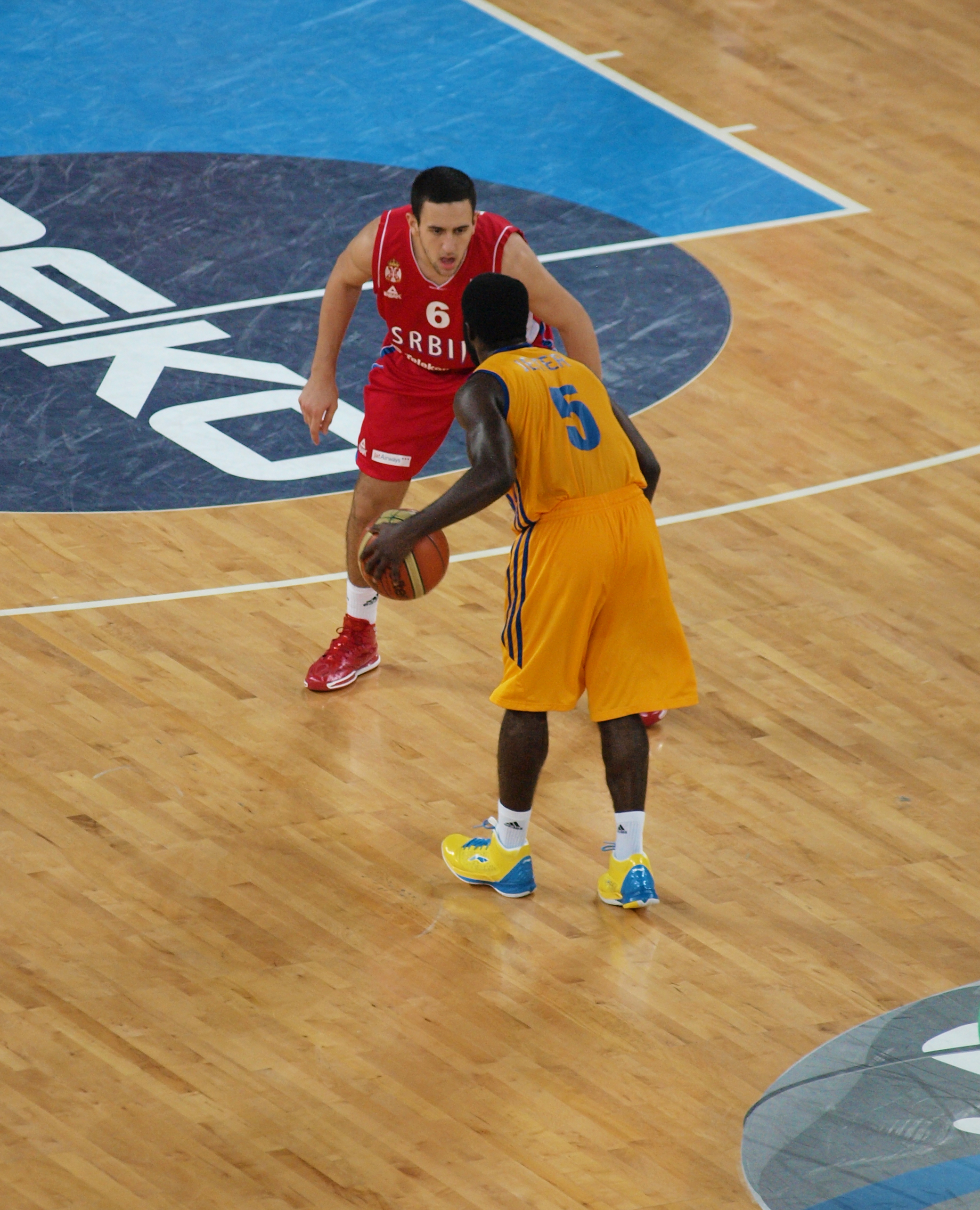
Eugene "Pooh" Jeter versus Vasilije Micić as Ukraine plays Serbia at the Eurobasket 2013.

At the EuroBasket 2011, the team failed to reach the semi-finals, finishing the tournament in eighth place; thus failing to qualify for the 2012 Summer Olympics. At the EuroBasket 2013, the team was once again eliminated in the quarter-finals and finished in seventh place.

==== 2013–2019: Silver generation ====
Following the EuroBasket 2013, Ivković stepped away from the position, and Serbian basketball hall of famer Aleksandar Đorđević stepped into his place.

Đorđević led the team to the silver medal at the 2014 FIBA World Cup, where they lost in the final to the United States. At the EuroBasket 2015, Serbia finished in fourth place, with their only tournament loses coming in the semi-finals to Lithuania and in the bronze-medal game to France.

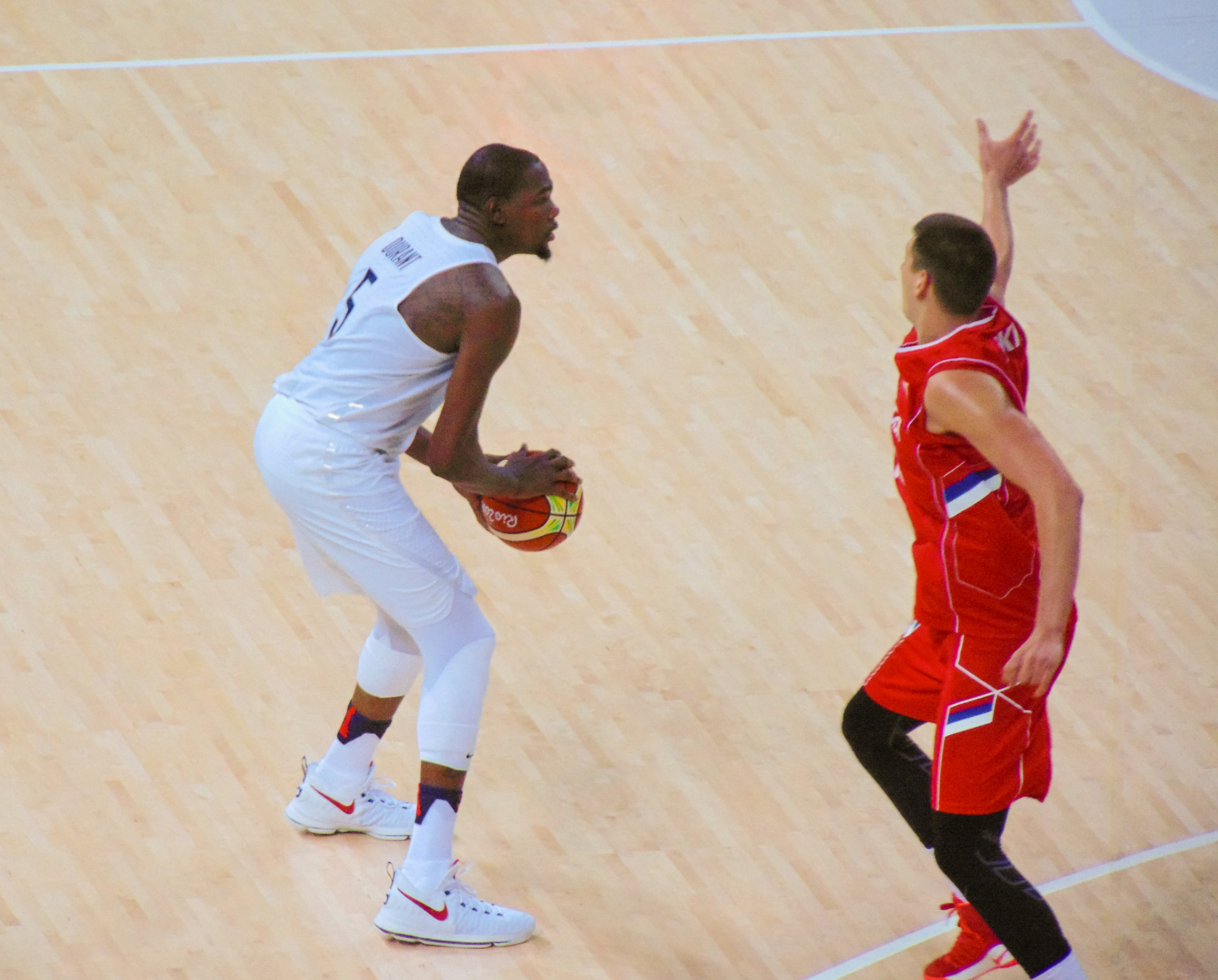
Nikola Jokić defending Kevin Durant at the 2016 Summer Olympics in Rio de Janeiro

After winning the 2016 Olympic Qualifying Tournament held in Belgrade, the national team won the silver medal at the 2016 Summer Olympics in Rio de Janeiro, losing in the final to the United States.

With the absence of team captains Miloš Teodosić, and Nikola Jokić, rising star Bogdan Bogdanović emerged as team leader at the EuroBasket 2017. The national team went on to earn their third silver medal in four years, after falling to a Goran Dragić-led Slovenia 93–85 in the final.

Facing a different qualification system introduced by FIBA for the 2019 FIBA World Cup, the national team was forced to play without their key players in nearly all of their qualification matches. However, they narrowly secured the last spot for the World Cup in their second round qualification group. Prior the World Cup, Serbia was dubbed as one of the favourites to win the tournament; but was eventually defeated in the quarter-finals by Argentina. With the team relegated to the classification phase, they would pick up wins against the United States and Czech Republic to finish in fifth place. After the tournament, head coach Đorđević announced his decision to leave the position after six years.

==== 2019–2021 ====
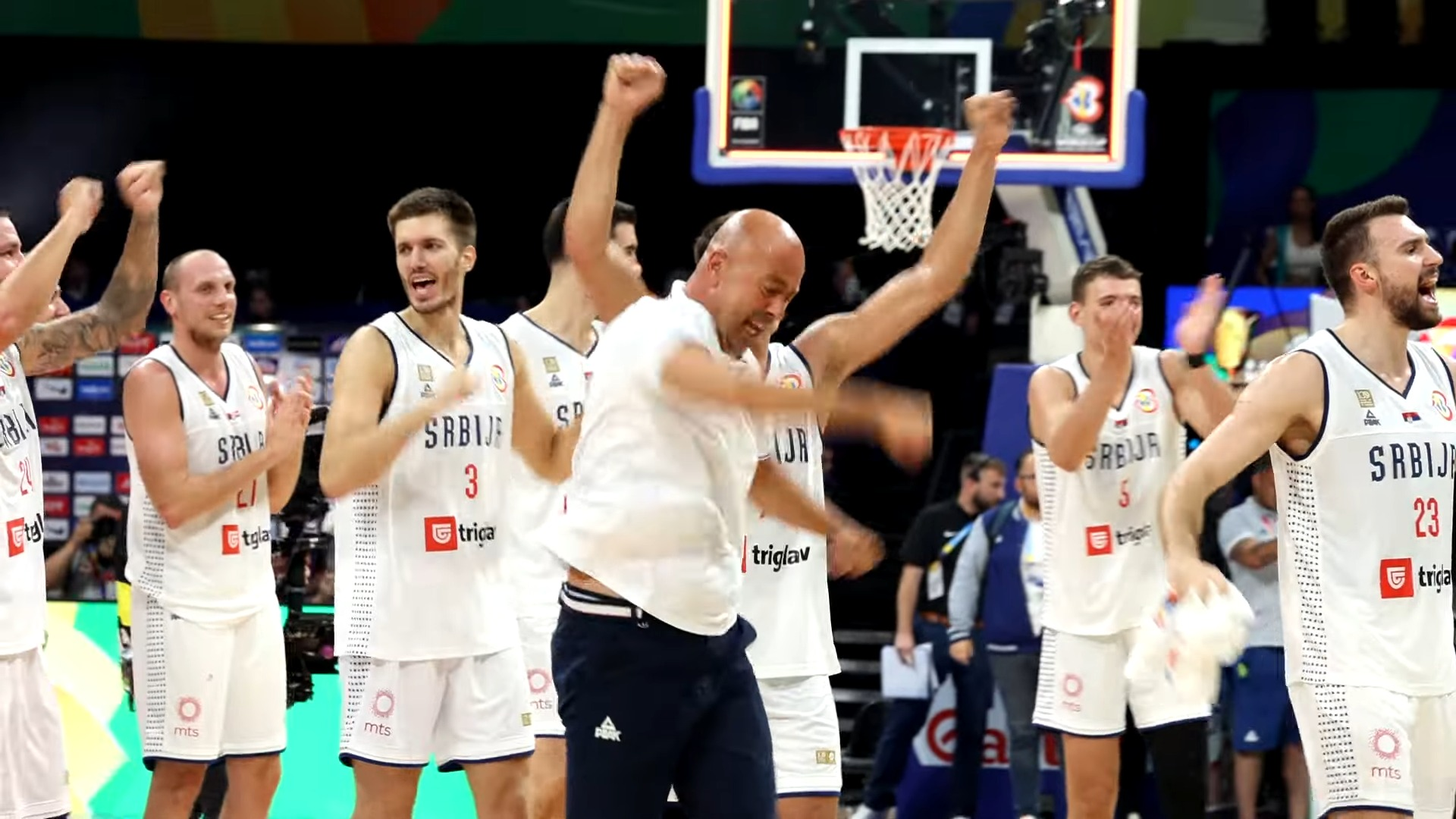
Serbia after winning their semi-final match against Canada at the 2023 FIBA World Cup.

Under head coach Igor Kokoškov, Serbia failed to qualify to the 2020 Summer Olympics after losing in the final game of the Qualifying Tournament to Italy before home crowd.

==== 2021–present ====
In 2021, legendary head coach Svetislav Pešić took over the team once again. In Pešić' first tournament as head coach, after winning all five group matches at the EuroBasket 2022, Italy upset Serbia in Round of 16 with 94–86 and Serbia finished in ninth place. At the 2023 FIBA World Cup, despite absence of several star players, Serbia managed to reach the tournament final where they lost to the Germany. Serbia won the bronze medal at the 2024 Summer Olympics after defeating Germany with 93–83. After finishing 10th at the EuroBasket 2025, Svetislav Pešić’s contract expired, and Dušan Alimpijević was appointed as the new head coach.

== Honours ==
=== Medals table ===
| Games | Gold | Silver | Bronze | Total |
| Summer Olympics | 0 | 2 | 1 | 3 |
| FIBA World Cup | 2 | 2 | 0 | 4 |
| EuroBasket | 3 | 2 | 1 | 6 |
| Mediterranean Games | 0 | 1 | 1 | 2 |
| Summer Universiade | 4 | 2 | 2 | 8 |
| Diamond Ball | 1 | 1 | 0 | 2 |
| Stanković Cup | 0 | 0 | 1 | 1 |
| Total | 10 | 10 | 6 | 26 |

== Competitive record ==
Name of the nation during the tournaments:

- FR Yugoslavia 1992–2002
- Serbia and Montenegro 2003–2006
- Serbia 2007–present

Major Tournaments Record
Olympic Games
| | Matches played | W-L | PCT | PF-PA | PD |
| | 35 | 21-14 | .600 | 2928 - 2667 | +261 |
FIBA World Cup
| | 58 | 40-18 | .690 | 5045 - 4306 | +739 |
EuroBasket
| | 108 | 75-33 | .694 | 8671 - 7969 | +702 |
| Total | 201 | 136-65 | .677 | 16644 - 14942 | +1702 |

=== Major tournaments ===
Major tournaments
| Tournament | Round | Position | W-L | PCT | PF-PA | PD | Head Coach | Qualification |
|---|---|---|---|---|---|---|---|---|
| (Switzerland) 1935 to (Italy) 1991 | Part of Yugoslavia | | | | | | Part of Yugoslavia | |
as FR Yugoslavia 1992–2002
| (Spain) 1992 Olympics | Suspended | | | | | | Duda Ivković | Suspended |
| (Germany) 1993 Eurobasket | Suspended | | | | | | Duda Ivković | Suspended |
| (Canada) 1994 World Cup | Suspended | | | | | | Duda Ivković | Suspended |
| (Greece) 1995 Eurobasket | (gold) Champions (gold) | 1st | 9-0 | 1.000 | 750-639 | +111 | Duda Ivković | Qualifying round |
| (United States) 1996 Olympics | (silver) Runners-up (silver) | 2nd | 7-1 | .875 | 741-578 | +163 | Željko Obradović | Directly qualified |
| (Spain) 1997 Eurobasket | (gold) Champions (gold) | 1st | 8-1 | .888 | 736-633 | +103 | Željko Obradović | Directly qualified |
| (Greece) 1998 World Cup | (gold) Champions (gold) | 1st | 8-1 | .888 | 698-563 | +135 | Željko Obradović | Directly qualified |
| (France) 1999 Eurobasket | (bronze) Semi-finals (bronze) | 3rd | 7-2 | .777 | 657-587 | +70 | Željko Obradović | Directly qualified |
| (Australia) 2000 Olympics | Quarter-finals | 6th | 4-3 | .571 | 494-483 | +11 | Željko Obradović | Directly qualified |
| (Turkey) 2001 Eurobasket | (gold) Champions (gold) | 1st | 6-0 | 1.000 | 549-409 | +140 | Svetislav Pešić | Directly qualified |
| (United States) 2002 World Cup | (gold) Champions (gold) | 1st | 7-2 | .777 | 806-670 | +136 | Svetislav Pešić | Directly qualified |
as Serbia and Montenegro 2003–2006
| (Sweden) 2003 Eurobasket | Quarter-finals | 6th | 3-4 | .429 | 537-561 | -24 | Duško Vujošević | Directly qualified |
| (Greece) 2004 Olympics | Group stage | 11th | 2-4 | .333 | 462-450 | +12 | Željko Obradović | Directly qualified |
| (Serbia and Montenegro) 2005 Eurobasket | Play-off round | 9th | 2-2 | .500 | 316-307 | +9 | Željko Obradović | Qualified as host |
| (Japan) 2006 World Cup | Round of 16 | 11th | 2-4 | .333 | 484-439 | +45 | Dragan Šakota | Wild card |
as Serbia 2007–
| (Spain) 2007 Eurobasket | Group stage | 14th | 0-3 | .000 | 215-228 | −13 | Moka Slavnić | Directly qualified |
| (China) 2008 Olympics | Did not qualify | | | | | | Duda Ivković | Did not qualify |
| (Poland) 2009 Eurobasket | (silver) Runners-up (silver) | 2nd | 6-3 | .666 | 680-661 | +19 | Duda Ivković | Group A |
| (Turkey) 2010 World Cup | Semi-finals | 4th | 6-3 | .666 | 800-699 | +101 | Duda Ivković | Directly qualified |
| (Lithuania) 2011 Eurobasket | Quarter-finals | 8th | 5-6 | .455 | 861-873 | -12 | Duda Ivković | Directly qualified |
| (United Kingdom) 2012 Olympics | Did not qualify | | | | | | Duda Ivković | Did not qualify |
| (Slovenia) 2013 Eurobasket | Quarter-finals | 7th | 6-5 | .545 | 809-828 | -19 | Duda Ivković | Group A |
| (Spain) 2014 World Cup | (silver) Runners-up (silver) | 2nd | 5-4 | .555 | 743-720 | +23 | Sale Đorđević | Directly qualified |
| (France) (Croatia) (Germany) (Latvia) 2015 Eurobasket | Semi-finals | 4th | 7-2 | .777 | 748-658 | +90 | Sale Đorđević | Directly qualified |
| (Brazil) 2016 Olympics | (silver) Runners-up (silver) | 2nd | 4-4 | .500 | 665-627 | +38 | Sale Đorđević | Qual. Tournament |
| (Finland) (Israel) (Romania) (Turkey) 2017 Eurobasket | (silver) Runners-up (silver) | 2nd | 7-2 | .777 | 741-670 | +71 | Sale Đorđević | Directly qualified |
| (China) 2019 World Cup | Quarter-finals | 5th | 6-2 | .750 | 753-598 | +155 | Sale Đorđević | Group L |
| (Japan) 2020 Olympics | Did not qualify | | | | | | Igor Kokoškov | Qual. Tournament |
| (Czech Republic) (Georgia (country)) (Italy) (Germany) 2022 EuroBasket | Round of 16 | 9th | 5-1 | .833 | 552-455 | +97 | Svetislav Pešić | Group E |
| (Philippines) (Japan) (Indonesia) 2023 World Cup | (silver) Runners-up (silver) | 2nd | 6-2 | .750 | 761-617 | +144 | Svetislav Pešić | Group I |
| (France) 2024 Olympics | (bronze) Semi-finals (bronze) | 3rd | 4-2 | .666 | 566-529 | +37 | Svetislav Pešić | Directly qualified |
| (Cyprus) (Finland) (Poland) (Latvia) 2025 Eurobasket | Round of 16 | 10th | 4-2 | .666 | 520-460 | +60 | Svetislav Pešić | Group G |
| (Qatar) 2027 World Cup | To be determined | | | | | | Dušan Alimpijević | Group C |
| (United States) 2028 Olympics | To be determined | | | | | | | |
| (Estonia) (Greece) (Slovenia) (Spain) 2029 Eurobasket | To be determined | | | | | | | |
| (France) 2031 World Cup | To be determined | | | | | | | |
| (Australia) 2032 Olympics | To be determined | | | | | | | |
| Total | | | 136-65 | .677 | 16644 - 14942 | +1702 | | 26/30 |

=== Olympic Games ===
Olympic Games
| Year | Round | Position | W-L | PCT | PF-PA | PD | Head Coach | Qualification |
|---|---|---|---|---|---|---|---|---|
| (Germany) 1936 to (South Korea) 1988 | Part of Yugoslavia | | | | | | Part of Yugoslavia | |
as FR Yugoslavia/Serbia and Montenegro 1992–2006
| (Spain) 1992 | Suspended | | | | | | Duda Ivković | Suspended |
| (United States) 1996 | (silver) Runners-up (silver) | 2nd | 7-1 | .875 | 741-578 | +163 | Željko Obradović | Directly qualified |
| (Australia) 2000 | Quarter-finals | 6th | 4-3 | .571 | 494-483 | +11 | Željko Obradović | Directly qualified |
| (Greece) 2004 | Group stage | 11th | 2-4 | .333 | 462-450 | +12 | Željko Obradović | Directly qualified |
as Serbia 2007–
| (China) 2008 | Did not qualify | | | | | | Duda Ivković | Did not qualify |
| (United Kingdom) 2012 | Did not qualify | | | | | | Duda Ivković | Did not qualify |
| (Brazil) 2016 | (silver) Runners-up (silver) | 2nd | 4-4 | .500 | 665-627 | +38 | Sale Đorđević | Qual. Tournament |
| (Japan) 2020 | Did not qualify | | | | | | Igor Kokoškov | Qual. Tournament |
| (France) 2024 | (bronze) Semi-finals (bronze) | 3rd | 4-2 | .666 | 566-529 | +37 | Svetislav Pešić | Directly qualified |
| (United States) 2028 | To be determined | | | | | | To be determined | |
| (Australia) 2032 | To be determined | | | | | | To be determined | |
| Total | | | 21-14 | .600 | 2928 - 2667 | +261 | | 5/8 |

=== FIBA World Cup ===
FIBA World Cup
| Year | Round | Position | W-L | PCT | PF-PA | PD | Head Coach | Qualification |
|---|---|---|---|---|---|---|---|---|
| (Argentina) 1950 to (Argentina) 1990 | Part of Yugoslavia | | | | | | Part of Yugoslavia | |
as FR Yugoslavia/Serbia and Montenegro 1992–2006
| (Canada) 1994 | Suspended | | | | | | Duda Ivković | Suspended |
| (Greece) 1998 | (gold) Champions (gold) | 1st | 8-1 | .888 | 698-563 | +135 | Željko Obradović | Directly qualified |
| (United States) 2002 | (gold) Champions (gold) | 1st | 7-2 | .777 | 806-670 | +136 | Svetislav Pešić | Directly qualified |
| (Japan) 2006 | Round of 16 | 11th | 2-4 | .333 | 484-439 | +45 | Dragan Šakota | Wild card |
as Serbia 2007–
| (Turkey) 2010 | Semi-finals | 4th | 6-3 | .666 | 800-699 | +101 | Duda Ivković | Directly qualified |
| (Spain) 2014 | (silver) Runners-up (silver) | 2nd | 5-4 | .555 | 743-720 | +23 | Sale Đorđević | Directly qualified |
| (China) 2019 | Quarter-finals | 5th | 6-2 | .750 | 753-598 | +155 | Sale Đorđević | Group L |
| (Philippines) (Japan) (Indonesia) 2023 | (silver) Runners-up (silver) | 2nd | 6-2 | .750 | 761-617 | +144 | Svetislav Pešić | Group I |
| (Qatar) 2027 | To be determined | | | | | | Dušan Alimpijević | Group C |
| (France) 2031 | To be determined | | | | | | | |
| Total | | | 40-18 | .690 | 5045 - 4306 | +739 | | 7/7 |

=== EuroBasket ===
EuroBasket
| Year | Round | Position | W-L | PCT | PF-PA | PD | Head Coach | Qualification |
|---|---|---|---|---|---|---|---|---|
| (Switzerland) 1935 to (Italy) 1991 | Part of Yugoslavia | | | | | | Part of Yugoslavia | |
as FR Yugoslavia/Serbia and Montenegro 1992–2006
| (Germany) 1993 | Suspended | | | | | | Duda Ivković | Suspended |
| (Greece) 1995 | (gold) Champions (gold) | 1st | 9-0 | 1.000 | 750-639 | +111 | Duda Ivković | Qualifying round |
| (Spain) 1997 | (gold) Champions (gold) | 1st | 8-1 | .889 | 736-633 | +103 | Željko Obradović | Directly qualified |
| (France) 1999 | (bronze) Semi-finals (bronze) | 3rd | 7-2 | .778 | 657-587 | +70 | Željko Obradović | Directly qualified |
| (Turkey) 2001 | (gold) Champions (gold) | 1st | 6-0 | 1.000 | 549-409 | +140 | Svetislav Pešić | Directly qualified |
| (Sweden) 2003 | Quarter-finals | 6th | 3-4 | .429 | 537-561 | -24 | Duško Vujošević | Directly qualified |
| (Serbia and Montenegro) 2005 | Play-off round | 9th | 2-2 | .500 | 316-307 | +9 | Željko Obradović | Qualified as host |
as Serbia 2007–
| (Spain) 2007 | Group stage | 14th | 0-3 | .000 | 215-228 | −13 | Moka Slavnić | Directly qualified |
| (Poland) 2009 | (silver) Runners-up (silver) | 2nd | 6-3 | .666 | 680-661 | +19 | Duda Ivković | Group A |
| (Lithuania) 2011 | Quarter-finals | 8th | 5-6 | .455 | 861-873 | -12 | Duda Ivković | Directly qualified |
| (Slovenia) 2013 | Quarter-finals | 7th | 6-5 | .545 | 809-828 | -19 | Duda Ivković | Group A |
| (France) (Croatia) (Germany) (Latvia) 2015 | Semi-finals | 4th | 7-2 | .777 | 748-658 | +90 | Sale Đorđević | Directly qualified |
| (Finland) (Israel) (Romania) (Turkey) 2017 | (silver) Runners-up (silver) | 2nd | 7-2 | .777 | 741-670 | +71 | Sale Đorđević | Directly qualified |
| (Czech Republic) (Georgia (country)) (Italy) (Germany) 2022 | Round of 16 | 9th | 5-1 | .833 | 552-455 | +97 | Svetislav Pešić | Group E |
| (Cyprus) (Finland) (Poland) (Latvia) 2025 | Round of 16 | 10th | 4-2 | .666 | 520-460 | +60 | Svetislav Pešić | Group G |
| (Estonia) (Greece) (Slovenia) (Spain) 2029 | To be determined | | | | | | | |
| Total | | | 75-33 | .694 | 8671 - 7969 | +702 | | 14/14 |

== Head to head record ==
A list of official matches played at the World and European Championships, as well as at the Olympic basketball tournament. Friendly matches are not included in this table.

| Opponents | Pld | W | L | PD |
|---|---|---|---|---|
| United States | 22 | 6 | 16 | -310 |
| Soviet Union/Russia | 45 | 19 | 26 | -182 |
| Australia | 12 | 11 | 1 | +161 |
| Italy | 41 | 31 | 10 | +155 |
| Spain | 38 | 25 | 13 | +187 |
| Lithuania | 12 | 7 | 5 | +21 |
| Canada | 10 | 9 | 1 | +51 |
| North Macedonia | 2 | 1 | 1 | +1 |
| Croatia | 4 | 4 | 0 | +20 |
| Montenegro | 3 | 0 | 3 | -19 |
| Total (11) | 186 | 113 | 73 | +104 |

Last updated: 25 September 2025

== Results and fixtures ==
Win Loss

=== 2023 ===
| 8 August 2023 International friendly | Greece | 64–71 | Serbia | Athens, Greece |
| 20:00 (UTC+3) | Scoring by quarter: 13–16, 22–23, 14–18, 15–14 |
| | Pts: Rogkavopoulos 19; Rebs: Mitoglou 10; Asts: Walkup 10 | Boxscore | Pts: Bogdanović 15; Rebs: Milutinov 12; Asts: Bogdanović 5 | Arena: O.A.C.A. Olympic Hall; Referees: Tsolakos, Somos, Tsimpouris |

| 9 August 2023 International friendly | Italy | 89–88 | Serbia | Athens, Greece |
| 20:00 (UTC+3) | Scoring by quarter: 19–32, 25–15, 26–23, 19–18 |
| | Pts: Fontecchio 13; Rebs: Polonara 11; Asts: Severini 5 | Boxscore | Pts: N. Jović 18; Rebs: N. Jović 7 Asts: Gudurić 6 | Arena: O.A.C.A. Olympic Hall; Referees: Papapetrou, Tziopanos, Agrafiotis |

| 16 August 2023 International friendly | Serbia | 110–75 | Puerto Rico | Belgrade, Serbia |
| 20:00 (UTC+2) | Scoring by quarter: 26–13, 39–12, 24–21, 21–29 |
| | Pts: Dobrić 23; Rebs: N. Jović 8 Asts: S. Jović 11 | Boxscore | Pts: Waters 11; Rebs: Romero 6 Asts: Thompson 4 | Arena: Štark Arena; Attendance: 12,526; Referees: Glišić, Jevtović, Pešić |

| 20 August 2023 International friendly | China | 64–87 | Serbia | Shenzhen, China |
| 19:30 (UTC+8) | Scoring by quarter: 12–23, 16–20, 23–22, 13–22 |
| | | | | Arena: Baoan District Gymnasium |

| 21 August 2023 International friendly | Serbia | 89–85 | Brazil | Shenzhen, China |
| 20:00 (UTC+8) | Scoring by quarter: 21–20, 24–18, 19–21, 25–26 |
| | | | | Arena: Baoan District Gymnasium |

| 26 August 2023 2023 FIBA World Cup Preliminary Round Group B | Serbia | 105–63 | China | Quezon City, Philippines |
| 20:00 (UTC+8) | Scoring by quarter: 25–14, 30–20, 22–13, 28–16 |
| | Pts: Bogdanović, Marinković 14; Rebs: Milutinov, Ristić 6 Asts: Gudurić, S. Jović 6 | Boxscore | Pts: Zhao R. 17; Rebs: Cui, Zhou 5 Asts: Zhao J. 6 | Arena: Araneta Coliseum; Attendance: 7,292; Referees: Yohan Rosso (FRA), Mārtiņš Kozlovskis (LAT), Rabah Noujaim (LBN) |

| 28 August 2023 2023 FIBA World Cup Preliminary Round Group B | Puerto Rico | 77–94 | Serbia | Quezon City, Philippines |
| 20:00 (UTC+8) | Scoring by quarter: 15–27, 12–30, 31–18, 19–19 |
| | Pts: Piñeiro 14; Rebs: Conditt 11; Asts: Waters 9 | Boxscore | Pts: Bogdanović, N. Jović 17; Rebs: Milutinov 15; Asts: S. Jović 6 | Arena: Araneta Coliseum; Attendance: 2,944; Referees: Yohan Rosso (FRA), Leandro Zalazar (ARG), Carlos Peralta (ECU) |

| 30 August 2023 2023 FIBA World Cup Preliminary Round Group B | South Sudan | 83–115 | Serbia | Quezon City, Philippines |
| 16:00 (UTC+8) | Scoring by quarter: 20–30, 19–26, 26–27, 18–32 |
| | Pts: Jok 21; Rebs: Omot 5 Asts: Jones 6 | Boxscore | Pts: N. Jović 25; Rebs: Milutinov 10; Asts: S. Jović 13 | Arena: Araneta Coliseum; Attendance: 5,848; Referees: Yohan Rosso (FRA), Kerem Baki (TUR), Rabah Noujaim (LBN) |

| 1 September 2023 2023 FIBA World Cup Second Round Group I | Serbia | 76–78 | Italy | Quezon City, Philippines |
| 16:00 (UTC+8) | Scoring by quarter: 19–23, 23–17, 20–19, 14–19 |
| | Pts: Bogdanović 18; Rebs: Milutinov 12; Asts: Bogdanović 4 | Boxscore | Pts: Fontecchio 30; Rebs: Fontecchio 7 Asts: Pajola 6 | Arena: Araneta Coliseum; Attendance: 3,117; Referees: Antonio Conde (ESP), Luis Castillo (ESP), Martin Vulić (CRO) |

| 3 September 2023 2023 FIBA World Cup Second Round Group I | Dominican Republic | 79–112 | Serbia | Quezon City, Philippines |
| 20:00 (UTC+8) | Scoring by quarter: 15–29, 20–27, 18–31, 26–25 |
| | Pts: Towns 25; Rebs: Towns 7 Asts: Montero 4 | Boxscore | Pts: Bogdanović 20; Rebs: S. Jović 6 Asts: S. Jović 7 | Arena: Araneta Coliseum; Attendance: 6,616; Referees: Yohan Rosso (FRA), Luis Castillo (ESP), Gatis Saliņš (LAT) |

| 5 September 2023 2023 FIBA World Cup Quarter-finals | Lithuania | 68–87 | Serbia | Pasay, Philippines |
| 16:45 (UTC+8) | Scoring by quarter: 25–24, 13–25, 17–24, 13–14 |
| | Pts: Sedekerskis 14; Rebs: Sedekerskis 9 Asts: Jokubaitis 9 | Boxscore | Pts: Bogdanović 21; Rebs: Petrušev 6 Asts: Gudurić 6 | Arena: Mall of Asia Arena; Attendance: 6,223; Referees: Omar Bermúdez (MEX), Mārtiņš Kozlovskis (LAT), Johnny Batista (PUR) |

| 8 September 2023 2023 FIBA World Cup Semi-finals | Serbia | 95–86 | Canada | Pasay, Philippines |
| 16:45 (UTC+8) | Scoring by quarter: 23–15, 29–24, 23–24, 20–23 |
| | Pts: Bogdanović 23; Rebs: Milutinov 10; Asts: S. Jovic 5 | Boxscore | Pts: Barrett 23; Rebs: five players 3 Asts: Gilgeous-Alexander 9 | Arena: Mall of Asia Arena; Attendance: 8,630; Referees: Yohan Rosso (FRA), Julio Anaya (PAN), Manuel Mazzoni (ITA) |

| 10 September 2023 2023 FIBA World Cup – Final | Germany | 83–77 | Serbia | Pasay, Philippines |
| 20:40 (UTC+8) | Scoring by quarter: 23–26, 24–21, 22–10, 14–20 |
| | Pts: Schröder 28; Rebs: Voigtmann 8 Asts: Voigtmann 3 | Boxscore | Pts: Avramović 21; Rebs: N. Jović 8 Asts: Bogdanović 5 | Arena: Mall of Asia Arena; Attendance: 12,022; Referees: Roberto Vázquez (PUR), Omar Bermúdez (MEX), Gatis Saliņš (LAT) |

=== 2024 ===
| 23 February 2024 EuroBasket 2025 qualifiers | Serbia | 77–61 | Finland | Belgrade, Serbia |
| 20:00 (UTC+1) | Scoring by quarter: 17–20, 19–14, 22–17, 19–10 |
| | Pts: Mitrović 19; Rebs: Mitrović 9 Asts: Petrušev 5 | Boxscore | Pts: Jantunen 11; Rebs: Valtonen 9 Asts: Maxhuni 6 | Arena: Aleksandar Nikolić Hall; Attendance: 8,000; Referees: Mārtiņš Kozlovskis (LAT), Marius Ciulin (ROU), Dariusz Zapolski (POL) |

| 26 February 2024 EuroBasket 2025 qualifiers | Georgia | 63–76 | Serbia | Tbilisi, Georgia |
| 21:00 (UTC+4) | Scoring by quarter: 12–21, 19–17, 21–22, 11–16 |
| | Pts: Shengelia 19; Rebs: Shermadini 9 Asts: Tsintsadze 6 | Boxscore | Pts: Gudurić 16; Rebs: Petrušev 8 Asts: Avramović 7 | Arena: Tbilisi Arena; Attendance: 9,400; Referees: Yohan Rosso (FRA), Martin Horozov (BUL), Michał Proc (POL) |

| 12 July 2024 International friendly | France | 67–79 | Serbia | Lyon, France |
| 21:00 (UTC+2) | Scoring by quarter: 23–18, 9–27, 20–15, 15–19 |
| | Pts: Wembanyama 14; Rebs: Wembanyama 10; Asts: three players 3 | Boxscore | Pts: Jokić 20; Rebs: Jokić 12; Asts: Avramović, Micić 3 | Arena: LDLC Arena; Attendance: 9,500 |

| 16 July 2024 International friendly | Australia | 84–73 | Serbia | Abu Dhabi, United Arab Emirates |
| 20:00 (UTC+4) | Scoring by quarter: 20–15, 19–25, 23–19, 22–14 |
| | Pts: Mills 28; Rebs: Exum 7 Asts: Mills 5 | Boxscore | Pts: Petrušev 17; Rebs: Jokić 14; Asts: Micić 8 | Arena: Etihad Arena |

| 17 July 2024 International friendly | United States | 105–79 | Serbia | Abu Dhabi, United Arab Emirates |
| 20:00 (UTC+4) | Scoring by quarter: 28–28, 31–17, 24–12, 22–21 |
| | Pts: Curry 24; Rebs: Adebayo, Embiid 8 Asts: three players 3 | Boxscore | Pts: Jokić 16; Rebs: Jokić 11; Asts: Avramović, Gudurić 3 | Arena: Etihad Arena; Attendance: 12,517 |

| 21 July 2024 International friendly | Serbia | 119–100 | Japan | Belgrade, Serbia |
| 20:00 (UTC+1) | Scoring by quarter: 33–23, 26–29, 32–18, 28–30 |
| | Pts: Jokić 18; Rebs: Jokić 8 Asts: Bogdanović 8 | Boxscore | Pts: Hachimura 29; Rebs: Hawkinson 5 Asts: Kawamura 8 | Arena: Belgrade Arena; Attendance: 15,026 |

| 22 July 2024 International friendly | Serbia | 94–72 | Greece | Belgrade, Serbia |
| 20:00 (UTC+1) | Scoring by quarter: 26–21, 22–18, 24–19, 22–14 |
| | Pts: Bogdanović 19; Rebs: Jokić, Petrušev 8 Asts: Avramović 8 | Boxscore | Pts: Antetokounmpo 17; Rebs: Antetokounmpo 6 Asts: three players 4 | Arena: Belgrade Arena; Attendance: 18,000 |

| 28 July 2024 2024 Summer Olympics Group stage | Serbia | 84–110 | United States | Lille, France |
| 17:15 (UTC+2) | Scoring by quarter: 20–25, 29–33, 16–26, 19–26 |
| | Pts: Jokić 20; Rebs: Bogdanović 6 Asts: Jokić 8 | Boxscore | Pts: Durant 23; Rebs: Davis 8 Asts: James 9 | Arena: Stade Pierre-Mauroy; Attendance: 27,328; Referees: Yohan Rosso (FRA), Julio Anaya (PAN), Martins Kozlovskis (LAT) |

| 31 July 2024 2024 Summer Olympics Group stage | Puerto Rico | 66–107 | Serbia | Lille, France |
| 17:15 (UTC+2) | Scoring by quarter: 12–24, 23–28, 16–27, 15–28 |
| | Pts: Ortiz 19; Rebs: Ortiz 6 Asts: Reed, Waters 3 | Boxscore | Pts: Petrušev 15; Rebs: Jokić 15; Asts: Jokić 9 | Arena: Stade Pierre-Mauroy; Attendance: 17,882; Referees: Julio Anaya (PAN), Juan Fernandez (ARG), Boris Krejic (SLO) |

| 3 August 2024 2024 Summer Olympics Group stage | Serbia | 96–85 | South Sudan | Lille, France |
| 21:00 (UTC+2) | Scoring by quarter: 23–22, 24–22, 25–23, 24–18 |
| | Pts: Bogdanović 30; Rebs: Jokić 13; Asts: Bogdanović 8 | Boxscore | Pts: Jones, Shayok 17; Rebs: Gabriel 8 Asts: Jones 10 | Arena: Stade Pierre-Mauroy; Attendance: 20,916; Referees: Ademir Zurapović (BIH), Yohan Rosso (FRA), Martins Kozlovskis (LAT) |

| 6 August 2024 2024 Summer Olympics Quarter-finals | Serbia | 95–90(OT) | Australia | Paris, France |
| 14:30 (UTC+2) | Scoring by quarter: 17–31, 25–23, 25–11, 15–17, Overtime: 13–8 |
| | Pts: Jokić 21; Rebs: Jokić 14; Asts: Jokić 9 | Boxscore | Pts: Mills 26; Rebs: Magnay 6 Asts: Exum 5 | Arena: Accor Arena; Attendance: 12,317; Referees: Yohan Rosso (FRA), Julio Anaya (PAN), Wojciech Liszka (POL) |

| 8 August 2024 2024 Summer Olympics Semi-finals | United States | 95–91 | Serbia | Paris, France |
| 21:00 (UTC+2) | Scoring by quarter: 23–31, 20–23, 20–22, 32–15 |
| | Pts: Curry 36; Rebs: James 12; Asts: James 10 | Boxscore | Pts: Bogdanović 20; Rebs: three players 5 Asts: Jokić 11 | Arena: Accor Arena; Attendance: 12,213; Referees: Ademir Zurapović (BIH), Julio Anaya (PAN), Martins Kozlovskis (LAT) |

| 10 August 2024 2024 Summer Olympics Third-place game | Germany | 83–93 | Serbia | Paris, France |
| 11:00 (UTC+2) | Scoring by quarter: 21–30, 17–16, 25–26, 20–21 |
| | Pts: F. Wagner 18; Rebs: F. Wagner 9 Asts: Weiler-Babb, Schröder 6 | Boxscore | Pts: Jokić, Micić 19; Rebs: Jokić 12; Asts: Jokić 11 | Arena: Accor Arena; Attendance: 12,406; Referees: Matthew Leigh Kallio (CAN), Yohan Rosso (FRA), Johnny Batista (PUR) |

| 21 November 2024 EuroBasket 2025 qualifiers | Denmark | 52–72 | Serbia | Copenhagen, Denmark |
| 18:00 (UTC+1) | Scoring by quarter: 5–29, 13–14, 16–19, 17–19 |
| | Pts: Engelhardt 13; Rebs: Sorensen 5 Asts: Pedersen 3 | Boxscore | Pts: Koprivica 13; Rebs: Ristić 6 Asts: Avramović 6 | Arena: Farum Arena; Attendance: 2,993; Referees: Wojciech Liszka (POL), Nicolas Maestre (FRA), Ilias Kounelles (CYP) |

| 24 November 2024 EuroBasket 2025 qualifiers | Serbia | 98–51 | Denmark | Belgrade, Serbia |
| 20:00 (UTC+1) | Scoring by quarter: 25–17, 25–11, 20–11, 28–12 |
| | Pts: Avramović 18; Rebs: Dobrić 8 Asts: Avramović 8 | Boxscore | Pts: Lundberg 15; Rebs: Lundberg 6 Asts: Lundberg 6 | Arena: Aleksandar Nikolić Hall; Attendance: 6,300; Referees: Paulo Marques (POR), Mihkel Männiste (EST), Orhan Cagri Hekimoglu (TUR) |

=== 2025 ===
| 21 February 2025 EuroBasket 2025 qualifiers | Finland | 95–105 | Serbia | Espoo, Finland |
| | Scoring by quarter: 26–24, 31–27, 14–28, 24–26 |
| | Pts: Jantunen 18; Rebs: Jantunen 6 Asts: Maxhuni 7 | Boxscore | Pts: Petrušev 34; Rebs: Petrušev 8 Asts: Avramović 9 | Arena: Espoo Metro Areena; Attendance: 6,146; Referees: Antonio Conde (ESP), Sergii Zashchuk (UKR), Dariusz Zapolski (POL) |

| 24 February 2025 EuroBasket 2025 qualifiers | Serbia | 63–54 | Georgia | Belgrade, Serbia |
| 20:00 (UTC+1) | Scoring by quarter: 13–17, 14–14, 17–10, 19–13 |
| | Pts: Avramović 14; Rebs: Beslać, Koprivica 5 Asts: S. Jović 6 | Boxscore | Pts: Burjanadze 17; Rebs: Jintcharadze, Phevadze 7 Asts: Jintcharadze 4 | Arena: Aleksandar Nikolić Hall; Attendance: 7,500; Referees: Gatis Saliņš (LAT), Ofer Manheim (ISR), Valentin Oliot (FRA) |

| 9 August 2025 International friendly | Greece | 66–76 | Serbia | Limassol, Cyprus |
| 20:30 (UTC+3) | Scoring by quarter: 26–26, 8–17, 13–12, 19–21 |
| | Pts: Mitoglou 18; Rebs: Papanikolaou 6 Asts: T. Antetokounmpo 5 | Boxscore | Pts: Jokić 23; Rebs: Jokić 19; Asts: Jokić 4 | Arena: Spyros Kyprianou Athletic Center; Attendance: 3,000; Referees: Ofer Manheim (ISR), Petar Pešić (SRB), Ioannis Tsibouris (GRE) |

| 10 August 2025 International friendly | Cyprus | 55–122 | Serbia | Limassol, Cyprus |
| 15:00 (UTC+3) | Scoring by quarter: 12–28, 10–38, 20–31, 13–25 |
| | Pts: Tigkas 17; Rebs: Stylianou 7 Asts: Willis, Michail 2 | Boxscore | Pts: Vukčević 24; Rebs: Vukčević 7 Asts: Topić 7 | Arena: Spyros Kyprianou Athletic Center; Attendance: 1,500; Referees: Ofer Manheim (ISR), Petar Pešić (SRB), Nir Meirson (ISR) |

| 15 August 2025 International friendly | Serbia | 113–84 | Czech Republic | Munich, Germany |
| 20:45 (UTC+2) | Scoring by quarter: 29–21, 32–27, 31–20, 21–16 |
| | Pts: Bogdanović 20; Rebs: three players 4 Asts: Jokić 6 | Boxscore | Pts: Kříž 12; Rebs: Peterka 5 Asts: Krejčí 5 | Arena: SAP Garden; Referees: Gatis Saliņš (LAT), Carsen Straube (GER), Nermin Hodžić (BIH) |

| 16 August 2025 International friendly | Germany | 81–91 | Serbia | Munich, Germany |
| 20:45 (UTC+2) | Scoring by quarter: 15–18, 17–20, 23–32, 26–21 |
| | Pts: F.Wagner 26; Rebs: Hollatz 5 Asts: Schröder 5 | Boxscore | Pts: N. Jović 22; Rebs: Jokić 8 Asts: Jokić 7 | Arena: SAP Garden; Referees: Peter Praksch (HUN), Martin Vulić (CRO), Gatis Saliņš (LAT) |

| 21 August 2025 International friendly | Serbia | 106–72 | Slovenia | Belgrade, Serbia |
| 20:45 (UTC+2) | Scoring by quarter: 33–23, 31–13, 27–20, 15–16 |
| | Pts: N. Jović 18; Rebs: Jokić 8 Asts: S. Jović 6 | | Pts: Dončić 17; Rebs: Dončić 7 Asts: Dončić 4 | Arena: Belgrade Arena; Attendance: 20,000; Referees: Ilija Belošević (SRB), Siniša Prpa (SRB), Petar Pešić (SRB) |

| 27 August 2025 EuroBasket 2025 Group A | Serbia | 98–64 | Estonia | Xiaomi Arena, Riga |
| 21:15 | Scoring by quarter: 32–12, 24–17, 30–15, 12–20 |
| | Pts: N. Jović 18; Rebs: Jokić 10; Asts: Bogdanović, Jokić 7 | Boxscore | Pts: Drell 11; Rebs: Riismaa, Treier 4 Asts: Vene 5 | Attendance: 8,151; Referees: Antonio Conde (ESP), Lorenzo Baldini (ITA), Geert Jacobs (BEL) |

| 29 August 2025 EuroBasket 2025 Group A | Portugal | 69–80 | Serbia | Xiaomi Arena, Riga |
| 21:15 | Scoring by quarter: 19–23, 14–20, 16–21, 20–16 |
| | Pts: Brito 22; Rebs: Brito 9 Asts: Lisboa 4 | Boxscore | Pts: Jokić 23; Rebs: Jokić 10; Asts: S. Jović 6 | Attendance: 2,942; Referees: Gediminas Petraitis (USA), Wojciech Liszka (POL), Ilias Kounelles (CYP) |

| 30 August 2025 EuroBasket 2025 Group A | Latvia | 80–84 | Serbia | Xiaomi Arena, Riga |
| 18:00 | Scoring by quarter: 18–22, 20–20, 18–25, 24–17 |
| | Pts: Dā. Bertāns 16; Rebs: Dā. Bertāns 10; Asts: Žagars 6 | Boxscore | Pts: Jokić 39; Rebs: Jokić 10; Asts: S. Jović 7 | Attendance: 11,000; Referees: Gediminas Petraitis (USA), Antonio Conde (ESP), Fernando Calatrava (ESP) |

| 1 September 2025 EuroBasket 2025 Group A | Serbia | 82–60 | Czechia | Xiaomi Arena, Riga |
| 21:15 | Scoring by quarter: 27–5, 18–18, 16–20, 21–17 |
| | Pts: Avramović 14; Rebs: three players 7 Asts: Avramović 8 | Boxscore | Pts: Bohačík 12; Rebs: Krejčí, Žídek 6 Asts: Sehnal 9 | Attendance: 2,256; Referees: Wojciech Liszka (POL), Yohan Rosso (FRA), Dariusz Zapolski (POL) |

| 3 September 2025 EuroBasket 2025 Group A | Turkey | 95–90 | Serbia | Xiaomi Arena, Riga |
| 21:15 | Scoring by quarter: 19–18, 27–31, 28–24, 21–17 |
| | Pts: Şengün 28; Rebs: Şengün 13; Asts: Larkin 9 | Boxscore | Pts: Jokić 22; Rebs: Jokić 9 Asts: S. Jović 6 | Attendance: 6,113; Referees: Petraitis Gediminas (USA), Liszka Wojciech (POL), Rosso Yohan (FRA) |

| 6 September 2025 EuroBasket 2025 Round of 16 | Serbia | 86–92 | Finland | Xiaomi Arena, Riga |
| 21:45 | Scoring by quarter: 24–28, 24–16, 18–24, 20–24 |
| | Pts: Jokić 33; Rebs: Jokić 8 Asts: three players 4 | Boxscore | Pts: Markkanen 29; Rebs: Markkanen, Little 8 Asts: Little 6 | Attendance: 4,006; Referees: Vazquez Jorge (PUR), Kato Takaki (JPN), Castillo Luis (ESP) |

| 27 November 2025 2027 FIBA World Cup qualifiers – 1st round | Serbia | 90–86 | Switzerland | Belgrade, Serbia |
| 19:00 | Scoring by quarter: 20–30, 14–27, 25–13, 31–16 |
| | Pts: Ristić 24; Rebs: Miljenović 8 Asts: Miljenović 9 | Boxscore | Pts: Schumacher 19; Rebs: T. Ročak 5 Asts: Fofana 5 | Arena: Aleksandar Nikolić Hall; Attendance: 2,000; Referees: Ariadna Chueca (ESP), Georgios Poursanidis (GRE), Edgard Ceccarelli (FRA) |

| 30 November 2025 2027 FIBA World Cup qualifiers – 1st round | Bosnia and Herzegovina | 72–74 | Serbia | Sarajevo, Bosnia and Herzegovina |
| 20:00 | Scoring by quarter: 15–13, 24–22, 19–16, 14–23 |
| | Pts: Castañeda 19; Rebs: Alibegović 7 Asts: Atić 5 | Boxscore | Pts: Tanasković 24; Rebs: Dobrić, Tanasković 8 Asts: Dobrić 5 | Arena: Mirza Delibašić Hall; Attendance: 4,500; Referees: Antonio Conde (ESP), Gatis Saliņš (LAT), Paulo Marques (POR) |

=== 2026 ===
| 27 February 2026 2027 FIBA World Cup qualifiers – 1st round | Serbia | 78–82 | Turkey | Belgrade, Serbia |
| 19:00 (UTC+1) | Scoring by quarter: 13–22, 18–24, 23–11, 24–25 |
| | Pts: Marković 19; Rebs: Mitrović 8 Asts: Miljenović 5 | Boxscore | Pts: Biberović 22; Rebs: Osmani 8 Asts: Osman 6 | Arena: Aleksandar Nikolić Hall; Attendance: 7,500; Referees: Yohan Rosso (FRA), Martins Kozlovskis (LAT), Zdenko Tomasovic (SVK) |

| 2 March 2026 2027 FIBA World Cup qualifiers – 1st round | Turkey | 94–86 | Serbia | Istanbul, Turkey |
| 21:00 (UTC+3) | Scoring by quarter: 28–21, 20–23, 28–19, 18–23 |
| | Pts: Biberović 21; Rebs: Biberović 5 Asts: Biberović 5 | Boxscore | Pts: Avramović 16; Rebs: Tanasković 6 Asts: Avramović 9 | Arena: Turkcell Basketball Development Centre; Attendance: 9,422; Referees: Luis Castillo (ESP), Paulo Marques (POR), Martin Horozov (BUL) |

| 2 July 2026 2027 FIBA World Cup qualifiers – 1st round | Switzerland | 73–97 | Serbia | Fribourg, Switzerland |
| 20:00 (UTC+2) | Scoring by quarter: 27–30, 17–19, 13–17, 16–31 |
| | Pts: Schumacher 19; Rebs: Soroa Schaller 5 Asts: Schumacher, Spadone, Fofana 2 | Boxscore | Pts: Jokić, Jović 22; Rebs: Jokić 14; Asts: Jokić 7 | Arena: BCF Arena; Attendance: 8,113; Referees: Martins Kozlovskis (LAT), Juozas Barkauskas (LTU), Sergii Zashchuk (UKR) |

| 6 July 2026 2027 FIBA World Cup qualifiers – 1st round | Serbia | 94–81 | Bosnia and Herzegovina | Belgrade, Serbia |
| 20:00 (UTC+1) | Scoring by quarter: 27–15, 27–20, 21–24, 19–22 |
| | Pts: Jović 32; Rebs: Jokić 10; Asts: Jokić 11 | Boxscore | Pts: Garza 16; Rebs: Alibegović, Garza 7 Asts: Talić 8 | Arena: Aleksandar Nikolić Hall; Attendance: 7,249; Referees: Wojciech Liszka (POL), Gatis Saliņš (LAT), Lorenzo Baldini (ITA) |

| 28 August 2026 2027 FIBA World Cup qualifiers – 2nd round | Serbia | 102–73 | Iceland | Belgrade, Serbia |
| 20:00 (UTC+1) | Scoring by quarter: 25–27, 27–15, 18–19, 32–12 |
| | Pts: Tanasković 23; Rebs: Jokić 13; Asts: Gudurić, Jokić 6 | Boxscore | Pts: Friðriksson 19; Rebs: Guðmundsson 10; Asts: Friðriksson 5 | Arena: Belgrade Arena; Attendance: 12,384; Referees: Luis Castillo (ESP), Valentin Oliot (FRA), Zdenko Tomašovič (SVK) |

| 31 August 2026 2027 FIBA World Cup qualifiers – 2nd round | Italy | 64–76 | Serbia | Pesaro, Italy |
| 19:30 | Scoring by quarter: 19–20, 12–20, 23–17, 10–19 |
| | Pts: Mannion 23; Rebs: Melli 7 Asts: Mannion, Melli 4 | Boxscore | Pts: Avramović 20; Rebs: Jokić 8 Asts: Gudurić 4 | Arena: Vitrifrigo Arena; Attendance: 9,487; Referees: Ariadna Chueca (ESP), Péter Praksch (HUN), Ritvars Helmšteins (LAT) |

| 26 November 2026 2027 FIBA World Cup qualifiers – 2nd round | Lithuania | vs. | Serbia | Klaipėda, Lithuania |
| | | Boxscore | | Arena: Švyturys Arena |

| 29 November 2026 2027 FIBA World Cup qualifiers – 2nd round | Serbia | vs. | Italy | Belgrade, Serbia |
| | | Boxscore | | Arena: Aleksandar Nikolić Hall |

=== 2027 ===
| 26 February 2027 2027 FIBA World Cup qualifiers – 2nd round | Iceland | vs. | Serbia |
| | | Boxscore |

| 1 March 2027 2027 FIBA World Cup qualifiers – 2nd round | Serbia | vs. | Lithuania |
| | | Boxscore |

== Team ==
=== Serbia depth chart ===
Serbia roster
Players
Coaches

| Pos. | No. | Name | Age – Date of birth | Height | Club | Ctr. |
|---|---|---|---|---|---|---|
| G | | Aleksa Avramović | 31 – 25 October 1994 | 1.92 m (6 ft 4 in) | Dubai Basketball | (United Arab Emirates) |
| F | | Matija Belić | 22 – 16 May 2003 | 2.01 m (6 ft 7 in) | Wyoming (college) | (United States) |
| F | | Dušan Beslać | 27 – 6 October 1998 | 2.06 m (6 ft 9 in) | Avtodor | (Russia) |
| G/F | | Bogdan Bogdanović | 33 – 18 August 1992 | 1.96 m (6 ft 5 in) | Los Angeles Clippers | (United States) |
| F | | Filip Borovićanin | 22 – 10 January 2004 | 2.06 m (6 ft 9 in) | Xavier (college) | (United States) |
| G/F | | Mitar Bošnjaković | 19 – 24 August 2006 | 2.01 m (6 ft 7 in) | Partizan | (Serbia) |
| F | | Nemanja Dangubić | 33 – 13 April 1993 | 2.04 m (6 ft 8 in) | Dubai Basketball | (United Arab Emirates) |
| F | | Dejan Davidovac | 31 – 17 January 1995 | 2.03 m (6 ft 8 in) | Crvena zvezda | (Serbia) |
| F/C | | Aleksa Dimitrijević | 19 – 30 May 2006 | 2.13 m (7 ft 0 in) | Creighton (college) | (United States) |
| G/F | | Ognjen Dobrić | 31 – 27 October 1994 | 2.01 m (6 ft 7 in) | Crvena zvezda | (Serbia) |
| G | | Savo Drezgić | 19 – 11 August 2006 | 1.94 m (6 ft 4 in) | Mega Basket | (Serbia) |
| G/F | | Asim Đulović | 20 – 30 July 2005 | 2.05 m (6 ft 9 in) | Mega Basket | (Serbia) |
| F | | Nikola Đurišić | 22 – 23 February 2004 | 2.03 m (6 ft 8 in) | Crvena zvezda | (Serbia) |
| G/F | | Marko Gudurić | 31 – 8 March 1995 | 1.98 m (6 ft 6 in) | Olimpia Milano | (Italy) |
| C | | Nikola Jokić | 31 – 19 February 1995 | 2.11 m (6 ft 11 in) | Denver Nuggets | (United States) |
| F | | Filip Jović | 21 – 1 February 2005 | 2.03 m (6 ft 8 in) | UCLA (college) | (United States) |
| F | | Nikola Jović | 22 – 9 June 2003 | 2.08 m (6 ft 10 in) | Miami Heat | (United States) |
| G | | Arijan Lakić | 26 – 20 January 2000 | 1.98 m (6 ft 6 in) | Partizan | (Serbia) |
| F | | Bogoljub Marković | 20 – 12 July 2005 | 2.11 m (6 ft 11 in) | Mega Basket | (Serbia) |
| G/F | | Vanja Marinković | 29 – 9 January 1997 | 1.99 m (6 ft 6 in) | Partizan | (Serbia) |
| G | | Vasilije Micić | 32 – 13 January 1994 | 1.96 m (6 ft 5 in) | Hapoel Tel Aviv | (Israel) |
| C | | Viktor Mikić | 20 – 14 September 2005 | 2.11 m (6 ft 11 in) | Florida (college) | (United States) |
| C | | Dušan Miletić | 27 – 30 July 1998 | 2.15 m (7 ft 1 in) | U-BT Cluj-Napoca | (Romania) |
| G | | Stefan Miljenović | 24 – 21 August 2001 | 1.93 m (6 ft 4 in) | Crvena zvezda | (Serbia) |
| C | | Nikola Milutinov | 31 – 30 December 1994 | 2.13 m (7 ft 0 in) | Olympiacos | (Greece) |
| F/C | | Luka Mitrović | 33 – 21 March 1993 | 2.06 m (6 ft 9 in) | CSKA Moscow | (Russia) |
| G/F | | Stefan Momirov | 26 – 18 December 1999 | 1.98 m (6 ft 6 in) | Spartak Subotica | (Serbia) |
| G | | Jovan Novak | 31 – 8 November 1994 | 1.88 m (6 ft 2 in) | Wilki Morskie Szczecin | (Poland) |
| G | | Mihailo Petrović | 23 – 23 February 2003 | 1.90 m (6 ft 3 in) | Illinois (college) | (United States) |
| F/C | | Filip Petrušev | 26 – 15 April 2000 | 2.11 m (6 ft 11 in) | Dubai Basketball | (United Arab Emirates) |
| C | | Uroš Plavšić | 27 – 22 December 1998 | 2.16 m (7 ft 1 in) | Crvena zvezda | (Serbia) |
| C | | Aleksej Pokuševski | 24 – 26 December 2001 | 2.13 m (7 ft 0 in) | Partizan | (Serbia) |
| C | | Dušan Ristić | 30 – 27 November 1995 | 2.13 m (7 ft 0 in) | Kawasaki Brave Thunders | (Japan) |
| F/C | | Alen Smailagić | 25 – 18 August 2000 | 2.06 m (6 ft 9 in) | Virtus Bologna | (Italy) |
| F/C | | Nikola Tanasković | 28 – 21 October 1997 | 2.04 m (6 ft 8 in) | Budućnost | (Montenegro) |
| G | | Nikola Topić | 20 – 10 August 2005 | 1.98 m (6 ft 6 in) | Oklahoma City Thunder | (United States) |

Head coach

- (Serbia) Dušan Alimpijević

Assistant coach(es)

- (Serbia) Milenko Bogićević
- (Serbia) Nenad Jakovljević
- (Serbia) Nemanja Jovanović
- (Serbia) Vladimir Jovanović
- (Serbia) Oliver Kostić
- (Serbia) Marko Marinović
- (Serbia) Mihajlo Mitić
- (Serbia) Ognjen Stojaković
- (Serbia) Tomislav Tomović

Legend

- (C) – Team captain
  (currently unassigned)
- Club – Club as of 28 April 2026
- Age – Age as of 28 April 2026
  (average of all 54 players: 26)

=== Depth chart for the 2027 FIBA World Cup qualifiers ===
| Pos. | Starting 5 | Bench 1 | Bench 2 | Bench 3 |
|---|---|---|---|---|
| C | Nikola Jokić | Nikola Milutinov | Nikola Tanasković | Bogoljub Marković |
| PF | Tristan Vukčević | Filip Petrušev | Dejan Davidovac | Nemanja Dangubić |
| SF | Nikola Jović | Vladimir Lučić | Ognjen Dobrić | Arijan Lakić |
| SG | Bogdan Bogdanović | Marko Gudurić | Vanja Marinković | Nikola Djurišić |
| PG | Nikola Topić | Vasilije Micić | Aleksa Avramović | Stefan Miljenović |

== Past rosters ==
- EuroBasket 1995
- EuroBasket 1997
- EuroBasket 1999
- EuroBasket 2001
- EuroBasket 2003
- EuroBasket 2005
- EuroBasket 2007
- EuroBasket 2009
- EuroBasket 2011
- EuroBasket 2013
- EuroBasket 2015
- EuroBasket 2017
- EuroBasket 2022
- EuroBasket 2025
- 1998 FIBA World Cup
- 2002 FIBA World Cup
- 2006 FIBA World Cup
- 2010 FIBA World Cup
- 2014 FIBA World Cup
- 2019 FIBA World Cup
- 2023 FIBA World Cup
- 1996 Summer Olympics
- 2000 Summer Olympics
- 2004 Summer Olympics
- 2016 Summer Olympics
- 2024 Summer Olympics

== Head coaches ==
Since 1992, the national team has been managed by a total of eight different head coaches. Dušan Ivković, Željko Obradović, and Svetislav Pešić are the only coaches with more than one spell.

FR Yugoslavia

| Years | Coach | Competition |
|---|---|---|
| 1992–1995 | (Serbia and Montenegro) Dušan Ivković | (gold) 1995 EuroBasket |
| 1996–2000 | (Serbia and Montenegro) Željko Obradović | (silver) 1996 Summer Olympics; (gold) 1997 EuroBasket; (gold) 1998 World Cup; (bronze) 1999 EuroBasket; 6th 2000 Summer Olympics |
| 2000–2002 | (Serbia and Montenegro) Svetislav Pešić | (gold) 2001 EuroBasket; (gold) 2002 World Cup |

Serbia and Montenegro

| Years | Coach | Competition |
|---|---|---|
| 2003 | (Serbia and Montenegro) Duško Vujošević | 6th 2003 EuroBasket |
| 2004–2005 | (Serbia and Montenegro) Željko Obradović | 11th 2004 Summer Olympics; 9th 2005 EuroBasket |
| 2006 | (Serbia and Montenegro) Dragan Šakota | 11th 2006 World Cup |

Serbia

| Years | Coach | Competition |
|---|---|---|
| 2007 | (Serbia) Zoran Slavnić | 14th 2007 EuroBasket |
| 2007–2013 | (Serbia) Dušan Ivković | (silver) 2009 EuroBasket; 4th 2010 World Cup; 8th 2011 EuroBasket; 7th 2013 EuroBasket |
| 2013–2019 | (Serbia) Aleksandar Đorđević | (silver) 2014 World Cup; 4th 2015 EuroBasket; (silver) 2016 Summer Olympics; (silver) 2017 EuroBasket; 5th 2019 World Cup |
| 2019–2021 | (Serbia) Igor Kokoškov | None |
| 2021–2025 | (Serbia) Svetislav Pešić | 9th 2022 EuroBasket; (silver) 2023 World Cup; (bronze) 2024 Summer Olympics; 10th 2025 EuroBasket |
| 2025– | (Serbia) Dušan Alimpijević | None |

== Player statistics ==
These tables include player statistics on Olympic games, FIBA World Cup and FIBA Eurobasket matches as well as matches on qualification tournaments since 1995. Friendly and preparation matches are not included.

- **Bold** denotes players still playing international basketball.

As of 31 August 2026, after the match against Italy.

=== Most capped players ===
| # | Player | National career | Matches | Points |
|---|---|---|---|---|
| 1 | Miloš Teodosić | 2007–2023 | 94 | 1057 |
| 2 | Dejan Bodiroga | 1995–2005 | 85 | 1023 |
| 3 | Nemanja Bjelica | 2009–2019 | 84 | 692 |
| 3 | Stefan Marković | 2007–2016 | 84 | 348 |
| 5 | Nenad Krstić | 2004–2014 | 77 | 933 |
| 6 | **Bogdan Bogdanović** | 2013– | 76 | 1130 |
| 7 | Dejan Tomašević | 1995–2005 | 71 | 502 |
| 8 | Stefan Jović | 2014–2025 | 64 | 323 |
| 9 | Milan Mačvan | 2009–2019 | 61 | 447 |
| 10 | Miroslav Raduljica | 2009–2021 | 58 | 627 |
| 10 | Saša Obradović | 1995–2001 | 58 | 392 |

=== Top scorers ===
| # | Player | National career | Points | Matches | Avg |
|---|---|---|---|---|---|
| 1 | **Bogdan Bogdanović** | 2013– | 1130 | 76 | 14.9 |
| 2 | Miloš Teodosić | 2007–2023 | 1057 | 94 | 11.2 |
| 3 | Dejan Bodiroga | 1995–2005 | 1023 | 85 | 12.0 |
| 4 | Nenad Krstić | 2004–2014 | 933 | 77 | 12.1 |
| 5 | **Nikola Jokić** | 2016– | 722 | 44 | 16.4 |
| 6 | Nemanja Bjelica | 2009–2019 | 692 | 84 | 8.2 |
| 7 | Predrag Danilović | 1995–2000 | 640 | 43 | 14.9 |
| 8 | Miroslav Raduljica | 2009–2021 | 627 | 58 | 10.8 |
| 9 | Dejan Tomašević | 1995–2005 | 502 | 71 | 7.1 |
| 10 | Predrag Stojaković | 1999–2003 | 474 | 29 | 16.3 |

== Notable players ==
=== Multiple medal winners ===
This is a list of people who have won two or more medals, who represented FR Yugoslavia / Serbia and Montenegro or Serbia since 1995.

| Player | Career | Gold | Silver | Bronze | Total |
|---|---|---|---|---|---|
| Dejan Bodiroga | 1995–2005 | 1st place, gold medalist(s) | 2nd place, silver medalist(s) | 3rd place, bronze medalist(s) | 7 |
| Dejan Tomašević | 1995–2005 | 1st place, gold medalist(s) | 2nd place, silver medalist(s) | 3rd place, bronze medalist(s) | 7 |
| Saša Obradović | 1995–2001 | 1st place, gold medalist(s) | 2nd place, silver medalist(s) | 3rd place, bronze medalist(s) | 6 |
| Željko Rebrača | 1995–2005 | 1st place, gold medalist(s) | 2nd place, silver medalist(s) | | 4 |
| Aleksandar Đorđević | 1995–1998 | 1st place, gold medalist(s) | 2nd place, silver medalist(s) | | 4 |
| Miroslav Berić | 1995–1998 | 1st place, gold medalist(s) | 2nd place, silver medalist(s) | | 4 |
| Vlade Divac | 1995–2002 | 1st place, gold medalist(s) | 2nd place, silver medalist(s) | 3rd place, bronze medalist(s) | 4 |
| Nikola Lončar | 1996–1999 | 1st place, gold medalist(s) | 2nd place, silver medalist(s) | 3rd place, bronze medalist(s) | 4 |
| Predrag Danilović | 1995–2000 | 1st place, gold medalist(s) | 2nd place, silver medalist(s) | 3rd place, bronze medalist(s) | 4 |
| Milenko Topić | 1996–1999 | 1st place, gold medalist(s) | 2nd place, silver medalist(s) | 3rd place, bronze medalist(s) | 4 |
| Zoran Savić | 1995–1997 | 1st place, gold medalist(s) | 2nd place, silver medalist(s) | | 3 |
| Milan Gurović | 1999–2007 | 1st place, gold medalist(s) | | 3rd place, bronze medalist(s) | 3 |
| Predrag Stojaković | 1999–2003 | 1st place, gold medalist(s) | | 3rd place, bronze medalist(s) | 3 |
| Marko Jarić | 2001–2007 | 1st place, gold medalist(s) | | | 2 |
| Igor Rakočević | 2000–2006 | 1st place, gold medalist(s) | | | 2 |
| Dejan Koturović | 1995–2003 | 1st place, gold medalist(s) | | | 2 |
| Žarko Paspalj | 1995–1996 | 1st place, gold medalist(s) | 2nd place, silver medalist(s) | | 2 |
| Dragan Lukovski | 1998–2000 | 1st place, gold medalist(s) | | 3rd place, bronze medalist(s) | 2 |
| Dragan Tarlać | 1999–2001 | 1st place, gold medalist(s) | | 3rd place, bronze medalist(s) | 2 |
| **Bogdan Bogdanović** | 2013– | | 2nd place, silver medalist(s) | 3rd place, bronze medalist(s) | 5 |
| **Stefan Jović** | 2014– | | 2nd place, silver medalist(s) | | 4 |
| Stefan Marković | 2007–2016 | | 2nd place, silver medalist(s) | | 3 |
| Miloš Teodosić | 2007–2016 | | 2nd place, silver medalist(s) | | 3 |
| Miroslav Raduljica | 2009–2019 | | 2nd place, silver medalist(s) | | 3 |
| Vladimir Štimac | 2013–2017 | | 2nd place, silver medalist(s) | | 3 |
| Stefan Birčević | 2014–2019 | | 2nd place, silver medalist(s) | | 3 |
| **Marko Gudurić** | 2017– | | 2nd place, silver medalist(s) | 3rd place, bronze medalist(s) | 3 |
| Milan Mačvan | 2009–2019 | | 2nd place, silver medalist(s) | | 3 |
| **Aleksa Avramović** | 2023– | | 2nd place, silver medalist(s) | 3rd place, bronze medalist(s) | 2 |
| Nemanja Bjelica | 2009–2019 | | 2nd place, silver medalist(s) | | 2 |
| **Dejan Davidovac** | 2022– | | 2nd place, silver medalist(s) | 3rd place, bronze medalist(s) | 2 |
| **Ognjen Dobrić** | 2023– | | 2nd place, silver medalist(s) | 3rd place, bronze medalist(s) | 2 |
| **Nikola Jokić** | 2016– | | 2nd place, silver medalist(s) | 3rd place, bronze medalist(s) | 2 |
| **Nikola Jović** | 2023– | | 2nd place, silver medalist(s) | 3rd place, bronze medalist(s) | 2 |
| Nenad Krstić | 2004–2014 | | 2nd place, silver medalist(s) | | 2 |
| Nikola Kalinić | 2013–2022 | | 2nd place, silver medalist(s) | | 2 |
| **Vanja Marinković** | 2022– | | 2nd place, silver medalist(s) | 3rd place, bronze medalist(s) | 2 |
| **Vasilije Micić** | 2013– | | 2nd place, silver medalist(s) | 3rd place, bronze medalist(s) | 2 |
| **Nikola Milutinov** | 2015– | | 2nd place, silver medalist(s) | 3rd place, bronze medalist(s) | 2 |
| **Filip Petrušev** | 2023– | | 2nd place, silver medalist(s) | 3rd place, bronze medalist(s) | 2 |
| Marko Simonović | 2014–2020 | | 2nd place, silver medalist(s) | | 2 |

- **People in bold** are still active competitors
- Montenegrin players from period 1995–2005 are not included, such as Vlado Šćepanović, Predrag Drobnjak and Nikola Bulatović.

=== Individual awards ===
(including achievements of Serbian players from 1945 to 1991)

==== International competitions ====
- **FIBA World Cup MVP** (1950-)
  - Dragan Kićanović – 1974
  - Dražen Dalipagić – 1978
  - Dejan Bodiroga – 1998
- **FIBA World Cup All-Tournament Team** (1950-)
  - Radivoj Korać – 1967
  - Dragan Kićanović – 1978, 1982
  - Dražen Dalipagić – 1978
  - Vlade Divac – 1990
  - Dejan Bodiroga – 1998
  - Željko Rebrača – 1998
  - Predrag Stojaković – 2002
  - Miloš Teodosić – 2010, 2014
  - Bogdan Bogdanović – 2019, 2023
- **FIBA World Cup Top Scorer – by total points** (1950-)
  - Dražen Dalipagić – 1978
  - Dragan Kićanović – 1982
  - Bogdan Bogdanović – 2019
- **EuroBasket MVP** (1935-)
  - Radivoj Korać – 1961
  - Dražen Dalipagić – 1977
  - Aleksandar Đorđević – 1997
  - Predrag Stojaković – 2001
- **EuroBasket All-Tournament Team** (1967-)
  - Dražen Dalipagić – 1975, 1977, 1981
  - Zoran Slavnić – 1977
  - Dragan Kićanović – 1979, 1981
  - Žarko Paspalj – 1989
  - Vlade Divac – 1991, 1995
  - Aleksandar Đorđević – 1997
  - Željko Rebrača – 1997
  - Dejan Bodiroga – 1997, 1999
  - Predrag Stojaković – 2001
  - Miloš Teodosić – 2009
  - Bogdan Bogdanović – 2017
- **FIBA EuroBasket Top Scorer** (1935-)
  - Radivoj Korać – 1959, 1961, 1963, 1965
- **EuroBasket Assists Leader**
  - Miloš Teodosić – 2009, 2011
- **Olympics All-Star Five** (2020-)
  - Nikola Jokić – 2024
- **Olympics All-Star second team** (2024-)
  - Bogdan Bogdanović – 2024
- **Olympics Best Defensive Player** (2024-)
  - Aleksa Avramović – 2024

==== Other notable achievements ====
- **FIBA Order of Merit**
  - Aca Nikolić – 1995
  - Nebojša Popović – 1997
  - Radomir Šaper – 1999
  - Borislav Stanković – 2015
- **FIBA Hall of Fame**
  - Borislav Stanković (as contributor) – 2007
  - Nebojša Popović (as contributor) – 2007
  - Radomir Šaper (as contributor) – 2007
  - Obrad Belošević (as official) – 2007
  - Radivoj Korać – 2007
  - Dražen Dalipagić – 2007
  - Dragan Kićanović – 2010
  - Vlade Divac – 2010
  - Zoran Slavnić – 2013
  - Predrag Stojaković – 2024
  - Ratko Radovanović – 2025
- **Naismith Memorial Basketball Hall of Fame**
  - Borislav Stanković (as contributor) – 1991
  - Dražen Dalipagić – 2004
  - Vlade Divac – 2019
  - Radivoj Korać – 2022
- **Euroscar** (1979-2019)
  - Dražen Dalipagić – 1980
  - Dragan Kićanović – 1981, 1982
  - Predrag Stojaković – 2001
  - Miloš Teodosić – 2016
- **Mr. Europa** (1976-2010)
  - Dražen Dalipagić – 1977, 1978
  - Dragan Kićanović – 1981, 1982
  - Vlade Divac – 1989
  - Aleksandar Đorđević – 1994, 1995
  - Predrag Danilović – 1998
  - Predrag Stojaković – 2001, 2002
- **FIBA Europe Men's Player of the Year Award** (2005-2014)
  - Miloš Teodosić – 2010
- **NBA Finals MVP**
  - Nikola Jokić – 2023
- **NBA Most Valuable Player**
  - Nikola Jokić – 2021, 2022, 2024
- **NBA Conference Finals MVP**
  - Nikola Jokić – 2023
- **All-NBA First Team**
  - Nikola Jokić – 2019, 2021, 2022, 2024, 2025, 2026
- **All-NBA Second Team**
  - Predrag Stojaković – 2004
  - Nikola Jokić – 2020, 2023
- **NBA All-Stars**
  - Vlade Divac – 2001
  - Predrag Stojaković – 2002, 2003, 2004
  - Nikola Jokić – 2019, 2020, 2021, 2022, 2023, 2024, 2025, 2026
- **NBA champion**
  - Darko Miličić – 2004
  - Predrag Stojaković – 2011
  - Ognjen Kuzmić – 2015
  - Nemanja Bjelica – 2022
  - Nikola Jokić – 2023
  - Nikola Topić - 2025
- **NBA All-Rookie First Team**
  - Vlade Divac – 1990
  - Nikola Jokić – 2016
- **NBA All-Rookie Second Team**
  - Bogdan Bogdanović – 2018
- **NBA 3-Point Shootout champion**
  - Predrag Stojaković – 2002, 2003
- **J. Walter Kennedy Citizenship Award**
  - Vlade Divac – 2000
- **Euroleague champion**
  - Žarko Varajić – 1979
  - Svetislav Pešić – 1979
  - Ratko Radovanović – 1979
  - Zoran Sretenović – 1989, 1990
  - Zoran Savić – 1990, 1991, 1998
  - Predrag Danilović – 1992, 1998
  - Aleksandar Đorđević – 1992
  - Slaviša Koprivica – 1992
  - Zoran Stevanović – 1992
  - Željko Rebrača – 1992, 2000
  - Nikola Lončar – 1992
  - Vladimir Dragutinović – 1992
  - Mlađan Šilobad – 1992
  - Dragiša Šarić – 1992
  - Igor Perović – 1992
  - Miroslav Pecarski – 1996
  - Dragan Tarlać – 1997
  - Milan Tomić – 1997
  - Dejan Bodiroga – 2000, 2002, 2003
  - Marko Jarić – 2001
  - Nikola Jestratijević – 2001
  - Radisav Ćurčić – 2001
  - Miloš Vujanić – 2007
  - Dejan Tomašević – 2007
  - Dušan Šakota – 2007, 2009
  - Milenko Tepić – 2011
  - Marko Kešelj – 2012
  - Miloš Teodosić – 2016
  - Bogdan Bogdanović – 2017
  - Nikola Kalinić – 2017
  - Vasilije Micić – 2021, 2022
  - Filip Petrušev – 2022
  - Marko Gudurić – 2025
  - Nikola Milutinov - 2026
- **EuroLeague MVP** (2005-)
  - Miloš Teodosić – 2010
  - Nemanja Bjelica – 2015
  - Vasilije Micić – 2021
- **EuroLeague Final Four MVP** (1988-)
  - Predrag Danilović – 1992
  - Žarko Paspalj – 1994
  - Zoran Savić – 1998
  - Željko Rebrača – 2000
  - Dejan Bodiroga – 2002, 2003
  - Vasilije Micić – 2021, 2022
- **Euroleague Rising Star** (2005-)
  - Novica Veličković – 2009
  - Bogdan Bogdanović – 2014, 2015
- **Euroleague Finals Top Scorer** (1958-)
  - Žarko Varajić – 1979
  - Zoran Savić – 1991
  - Predrag Danilović – 1992
  - Dejan Bodiroga – 2001, 2003
  - Miloš Vujanić – 2004
  - Bogdan Bogdanović – 2017
  - Nikola Kalinić – 2017
  - Vasilije Micić – 2021, 2022
- **EuroLeague Top Scorer** (1992-)
  - Predrag Danilović – 1995
  - Predrag Stojaković – 1998
  - Miroslav Berić - 2001
  - Miloš Vujanić – 2003
  - Igor Rakočević – 2007, 2009, 2011
  - Vasilije Micić – 2022
- **EuroLeague rebounds leader**
  - Dejan Tomašević – 1998, 2001
  - Boban Marjanović – 2015
  - Nikola Milutinov – 2020, 2021, 2026
- **EuroLeague assists leader**
  - Miloš Teodosić – 2015, 2017
- **EuroLeague PIR leader**
  - Dejan Tomašević – 2001
  - Boban Marjanović – 2015
- **All EuroLeague First Team** (2001-)
  - Dejan Tomašević – 2001, 2002
  - Marko Jarić – 2002
  - Dejan Bodiroga – 2002, 2003, 2004
  - Igor Rakočević – 2009
  - Miloš Teodosić – 2010, 2015, 2016
  - Nenad Krstić – 2012, 2013
  - Nemanja Bjelica – 2015
  - Boban Marjanović – 2015
  - Bogdan Bogdanović – 2017
  - Vasilije Micić – 2021
  - Vladimir Lučić – 2021
  - Nikola Milutinov – 2026
- **All EuroLeague Second Team** (2001-)
  - Miloš Vujanić – 2003, 2004
  - Igor Rakočević – 2007
  - Duško Savanović – 2011
  - Miloš Teodosić – 2012, 2013, 2017
  - Vasilije Micić – 2019, 2022
  - Vladimir Lučić – 2022
- **EuroLeague Basketball 2000–10 All-Decade Team**
  - Dejan Bodiroga – 2010
- **EuroLeague 2000–10 Player of the Decade**
  - Dejan Bodiroga – 2010
- **EuroLeague Basketball 2010–20 All-Decade Team**
  - Bogdan Bogdanović – 2020
  - Miloš Teodosić – 2020
- **EuroLeague 25th Anniversary Team**
  - Dejan Bodiroga
  - Bogdan Bogdanović
  - Vasilije Micić
  - Miloš Teodosić
- **FIBA's 50 Greatest Players (1991)**
  - Radivoj Korać
  - Dražen Dalipagić
  - Dragan Kićanović
  - Zoran Slavnić
  - Vlade Divac
- **50 Greatest EuroLeague Contributors (2008)**
  - Radivoj Korać
  - Dražen Dalipagić
  - Vlade Divac
  - Aleksandar Đorđević
  - Predrag Danilović
  - Dejan Bodiroga
- **All-Europeans Player of the Year** (2002-)
  - Predrag Stojaković – 2002, 2003, 2004
  - Nikola Jokić – 2021, 2022, 2023, 2024
- **All-Europe Player of the Year** (2002-)
  - Dejan Bodiroga – 2002
  - Bogdan Bogdanović – 2017
  - Vasilije Micić – 2021, 2022
- **All-Europe First Team** (2003-)
  - Dejan Bodiroga – 2003, 2004
  - Miloš Teodosić – 2010, 2016
  - Nenad Krstić – 2012, 2013
  - Boban Marjanović – 2014
  - Nemanja Bjelica – 2015
  - Bogdan Bogdanović – 2017
  - Nikola Milutinov – 2019
  - Vladimir Lučić – 2020, 2021
  - Vasilije Micić – 2021, 2022
- **All-Europe Second Team** (2003-)
  - Dejan Tomašević – 2003
  - Dejan Milojević – 2004
  - Igor Rakočević – 2008, 2009
  - Zoran Erceg – 2014
  - Miloš Teodosić – 2015, 2017
  - Boban Marjanović – 2015
  - Vasilije Micić – 2019, 2020, 2023

== Notable coaches ==
=== Individual achievements ===
(including achievements of Serbian coaches from 1945 to 1991)

- Naismith Memorial Basketball Hall of Fame
  - Aca Nikolić – 1998
- FIBA Hall of Fame
  - Aca Nikolić – 2007
  - Ranko Žeravica – 2007
  - Dušan Ivković – 2017
  - Svetislav Pešić – 2020
  - Milan Vasojević – 2022
- NBA All-Star Game
  - Igor Kokoškov – 2006 (as assistant coach)
  - Ognjen Stojaković – 2023 (as assistant coach)
  - Darko Rajaković – 2023 (as head coach)
- NBA–winning assistant coach
  - Igor Kokoškov – 2004
  - Dejan Milojević – 2022
  - Ognjen Stojaković – 2023
- EuroLeague Basketball Legend Award
  - Dušan Ivković – 2017
- 50 Greatest EuroLeague Contributors (2008)
  - Aca Nikolić
  - Dušan Ivković
  - Željko Obradović
  - Božidar Maljković
- Alexander Gomelsky EuroLeague Coach of the Year (2005-)
  - Željko Obradović – 2007, 2011, 2017
  - Duško Vujošević – 2009
  - Dušan Ivković – 2012
- All-Europe Coach of the Year (2003-)
  - Svetislav Pešić – 2003
  - Željko Obradović – 2007, 2009, 2011
  - Dušan Ivković – 2012
  - Igor Kokoškov – 2017
- EuroLeague-winning head coach
  - Aca Nikolić – 1970, 1972, 1973
  - Željko Obradović – 1992, 1994, 1995, 2000, 2002, 2007, 2009, 2011, 2017
  - Dušan Ivković – 1997, 2012
  - Božidar Maljković – 1989, 1990, 1993, 1996
  - Svetislav Pešić – 2003
- Triple Crown
  - Aca Nikolić – 1970, 1973
  - Božidar Maljković – 1990
  - Željko Obradović – 1992, 2007, 2009
  - Dušan Ivković – 1997
  - Svetislav Pešić – 2003

== See also ==
- Serbia men's national under-20 basketball team
- Serbia men's national under-19 basketball team
- Serbia men's national under-18 basketball team
- Serbia men's national under-17 basketball team
- Serbia men's national under-16 basketball team
