= Misan Haldin =

German-Nigerian basketball player

Personal information
- Born: 7 July 1982 (age 44) Berlin
- Listed height: 6 ft 4 in (1.93 m)
- Listed weight: 200 lb (91 kg)

Career information
- NBA draft: 2004: undrafted
- Playing career: 1998–2012
- Position: Point guard

Career history
- 1998–2000: TuS Lichterfelde
- 2000–2001: ALBA Berlin
- 2001–2002: Olympiacos Piraeus
- 2002–2003: Snaidero Udine
- 2003–2004: Mitteldeutscher BC
- 2004–2005: Sedima Roseto
- 2005–2006: Vertical Vision Cantù
- 2006–2007: Premiata Montegranaro
- 2007–2008: Köln 99ers
- 2008–2009: Pallacanestro Varese
- 2010–2011: DBV Charlottenburg
- 2011–2012: LTi Gießen 46ers
Medals
Men's basketball
Representing Germany
FIBA World Cup
Bronze medal – third place	2002 USA
EuroBasket
Silver medal – second place	2005 Serbia & Montenegro

Misan Haldin (born 7 July 1982 as Eyinmisan Edward Ogharanemeye Nikagbatse) is a German former basketball player. He played for clubs in Germany, Greece and Italy.

== Professional career ==
Haldin started his professional career at TuS Lichterfelde Berlin, then a farm team of ALBA Berlin. At the 2000 international Albert Schweitzer Youth Tournament, he was the best scorer overall. Haldin signed a contract with ALBA, but did not play for them as he wanted to play for a top club on a European level. After nearly one year without playing in any official game, he signed with Olympiacos Piraeus. After playing for the Italian club Snaidero Udine for half a year, Haldin returned to Germany to play for Mitteldeutscher, with which he won the EuroCup Challenge. He was automatically eligible for the 2004 NBA draft, but was not drafted.

Haldin then moved to Italy again, playing for Sedima Roseto and Vertical Vision Cantù in the first division. At the beginning of 2006, he signed for second division club Premiata Montegranaro, with which he got promoted to the first division. Haldin returned to Germany, but was waived by the Köln 99ers in March 2008, after testing positive on THC, although he was not officially suspended as he did not play during that time due to an injury. Another spell in Italy followed, this time playing for Pallacanestro Varese and winning the Legadue championship. He returned to professional sports in 2011, when he was acquired by the LTi Gießen 46ers. However, he was again waived during the season.

== National team career ==
Haldin won the bronze medal as a member of the senior German squad at the 2002 FIBA World Championship, dunking over Yao Ming during the competition. He also took part in the EuroBasket 2005, winning the silver medal. The German national team's head coach, Dirk Bauermann, cut his name off the roster for the 2008 Olympics qualification, after his drug abuse incident .

== Personal life ==
He was born in Berlin (Germany) to Nigerian father and Finnish mother, and his sister Roli-Ann is a member of the German women's national team. In 2012, they adopted their mother's name, Haldin.
