= Basketball at the 2024 Summer Olympics – Men's team rosters =

This article shows the rosters of all participating teams at the 5x5 men's basketball tournament at the 2024 Summer Olympics in Paris, France.

== Group A ==
=== Australia ===
A 22-player roster was announced on 10 April 2024. It was cut to 17 players on 16 May. The final squad was finalized on 5 July.

Australia men's national basketball team – 2024 Summer Olympics roster
Players
Coaches

Pos.	No.	Name	Age – Date of birth	Height	Club	Ctr.
PG	1	Dyson Daniels	21 – 17 March 2003	2.01 m (6 ft 7 in)	Atlanta Hawks	(United States)
G	3	Josh Giddey	21 – 10 October 2002	2.03 m (6 ft 8 in)	Chicago Bulls	(United States)
G	5	Patty Mills (C)	35 – 11 August 1988	1.88 m (6 ft 2 in)	Miami Heat	(United States)
SF	6	Josh Green	23 – 16 November 2000	1.96 m (6 ft 5 in)	Charlotte Hornets	(United States)
SF	7	Joe Ingles	36 – 2 October 1987	2.03 m (6 ft 8 in)	Minnesota Timberwolves	(United States)
G	8	Matthew Dellavedova	33 – 8 September 1990	1.93 m (6 ft 4 in)	Melbourne United	(Australia)
PG	11	Dante Exum	29 – 13 July 1995	1.96 m (6 ft 5 in)	Dallas Mavericks	(United States)
C	13	Jock Landale	28 – 25 October 1995	2.11 m (6 ft 11 in)	Houston Rockets	(United States)
PF	15	Nick Kay	31 – 3 August 1992	2.06 m (6 ft 9 in)	Shimane Susanoo Magic	(Japan)
SF	17	Jack McVeigh	28 – 26 June 1996	2.03 m (6 ft 8 in)	Houston Rockets	(United States)
C	22	Will Magnay	26 – 10 June 1998	2.08 m (6 ft 10 in)	Tasmania JackJumpers	(Australia)
C	26	Duop Reath	28 – 26 June 1996	2.06 m (6 ft 9 in)	Portland Trail Blazers	(United States)

Head coach

- (Australia) Brian Goorjian

Assistant coach(es)

- (Australia) Adam Caporn
- (Australia) Matt Nielsen
- (Australia) David Patrick

Legend

- (C) Team captain
- Club – describes last
  club before the tournament
- Age – describes age
  on 27 July 2024

=== Canada ===
A 20-player roster was announced on June 19, 2024. Andrew Wiggins and Zach Edey withdrew on June 29 and 30 respectively. Oshae Brissett and Kyle Alexander were released on July 3, 2024. Trae Bell-Haynes left the team on July 6, 2024. The final roster was announced on July 10, 2024 after the release of Thomas Scrubb, Phil Scrubb and Mfiondu Kabengele.

Canada Men's National Basketball Team – 2024 Summer Olympics roster
Players
Coaches

Pos.	No.	Name	Age – Date of birth	Height	Club	Ctr.
G/F	0	Luguentz Dort	25 – 19 April 1999	1.94 m (6 ft 4 in)	Oklahoma City Thunder	(United States)
SG	1	Nickeil Alexander-Walker	25 – 2 September 1998	1.96 m (6 ft 5 in)	Minnesota Timberwolves	(United States)
PG	2	Shai Gilgeous-Alexander	26 – 12 July 1998	1.98 m (6 ft 6 in)	Oklahoma City Thunder	(United States)
SF	3	Melvin Ejim	33 – 4 March 1991	2.01 m (6 ft 7 in)	Unicaja Málaga	(Spain)
PG	4	Jamal Murray	27 – 23 February 1997	1.93 m (6 ft 4 in)	Denver Nuggets	(United States)
C	7	Dwight Powell	33 – 20 July 1991	2.12 m (6 ft 11 in)	Dallas Mavericks	(United States)
PF	8	Trey Lyles	28 – 5 November 1995	2.08 m (6 ft 10 in)	Sacramento Kings	(United States)
G/F	9	RJ Barrett	24 – 14 June 2000	1.95 m (6 ft 5 in)	Toronto Raptors	(Canada)
F/C	13	Kelly Olynyk (C)	33 – 19 April 1991	2.11 m (6 ft 11 in)	Toronto Raptors	(Canada)
PG	19	Andrew Nembhard	24 – 16 January 2000	1.87 m (6 ft 2 in)	Indiana Pacers	(United States)
SF	24	Dillon Brooks	28 – 22 January 1996	1.98 m (6 ft 6 in)	Houston Rockets	(United States)
C	92	Khem Birch	31 – 28 September 1992	2.06 m (6 ft 9 in)	Bàsquet Girona	(Spain)

Head coach

- (Spain) Jordi Fernández

Assistant coach(es)

- (United States) Nate Bjorkgren
- (Canada) Philip Jevtovic
- (Canada) Michael Meeks
- (Canada) Nathaniel Mitchell

Legend

- (C) Team captain
- Club – describes last
  club before the competition
- Age – describes age
  on 27 July 2024

=== Greece ===
The roster was announced on 23 July 2024.

Greece men's national basketball team – 2024 Summer Olympics roster
Players
Coaches

Pos.	No.	Name	Age – Date of birth	Height	Club	Ctr.
PG	0	Thomas Walkup	31 – 30 December 1992	1.93 m (6 ft 4 in)	Olympiacos	(Greece)
SG	5	Giannoulis Larentzakis	30 – 22 September 1993	1.96 m (6 ft 5 in)	Olympiacos	(Greece)
G	6	Dimitrios Moraitis	25 – 3 February 1999	1.94 m (6 ft 4 in)	Panathinaikos	(Greece)
G	7	Vassilis Toliopoulos	28 – 15 June 1996	1.88 m (6 ft 2 in)	Aris Thessaloniki	(Greece)
PG	8	Nick Calathes	35 – 7 February 1989	1.98 m (6 ft 6 in)	AS Monaco	(France)
SF	11	Panagiotis Kalaitzakis	25 – 2 January 1999	2.00 m (6 ft 7 in)	Panathinaikos	(Greece)
C	14	Georgios Papagiannis	27 – 3 July 1997	2.17 m (7 ft 1 in)	AS Monaco	(France)
F	15	Vassilis Charalampopoulos	27 – 6 January 1997	2.03 m (6 ft 8 in)	Türk Telekom	(Turkey)
SF	16	Kostas Papanikolaou (C)	33 – 31 July 1990	2.03 m (6 ft 8 in)	Olympiacos	(Greece)
PF	33	Nikos Chougkaz	23 – 4 October 2000	2.07 m (6 ft 9 in)	BC Andorra	(Spain)
PF	34	Giannis Antetokounmpo	29 – 6 December 1994	2.11 m (6 ft 11 in)	Milwaukee Bucks	(United States)
F/C	44	Dinos Mitoglou	28 – 11 June 1996	2.10 m (6 ft 11 in)	Panathinaikos	(Greece)

Head coach

- (Greece) Vassilis Spanoulis

Assistant coach(es)

- (Greece) Kostas Charalampidis
- (Greece) Ilias Kantzouris
- (Greece) Diamantis Panagiotopoulos
- (Greece) Stefanos Trantafillos

Legend

- (C) Team captain
- Club – describes last club
  before the tournament
- Age – describes age
  on 27 July 2024

=== Spain ===
The roster was announced on 9 July 2024.

Spain Men's National Basketball Team – 2024 Summer Olympics roster
Players
Coaches

Pos.	No.	Name	Age – Date of birth	Height	Club	Ctr.
PG	2	Lorenzo Brown	33 – 26 August 1990	1.96 m (6 ft 5 in)	Panathinaikos	(Greece)
PF	4	Jaime Pradilla	23 – 3 January 2001	2.05 m (6 ft 9 in)	Valencia	(Spain)
SF	5	Rudy Fernández (C)	39 – 4 April 1985	1.96 m (6 ft 5 in)	Real Madrid	(Spain)
SF	6	Xabier López-Arostegui	27 – 19 May 1997	2.01 m (6 ft 7 in)	Valencia	(Spain)
PF	7	Santi Aldama	23 – 10 January 2001	2.11 m (6 ft 11 in)	Memphis Grizzlies	(United States)
SG	8	Darío Brizuela	29 – 8 November 1994	1.85 m (6 ft 1 in)	Barcelona	(Spain)
PG	9	Alberto Díaz	30 – 23 April 1994	1.90 m (6 ft 3 in)	Unicaja	(Spain)
PF	10	Juancho Hernangómez	28 – 28 September 1995	2.06 m (6 ft 9 in)	Panathinaikos	(Greece)
C	14	Willy Hernangómez	30 – 27 May 1994	2.11 m (6 ft 11 in)	Barcelona	(Spain)
C	16	Usman Garuba	22 – 9 March 2002	2.03 m (6 ft 8 in)	Golden State Warriors	(United States)
SG	21	Álex Abrines	30 – 1 August 1993	1.98 m (6 ft 6 in)	Barcelona	(Spain)
SG	23	Sergio Llull	36 – 15 November 1987	1.90 m (6 ft 3 in)	Real Madrid	(Spain)

Head coach

- (Italy) Sergio Scariolo

Assistant coach(es)

- (Spain) Luis Guil
- (Spain) Angel Sanchez-Cañete

Legend

- (C) Team captain
- Club – describes last
  club before the competition
- Age – describes age
  on 27 July 2024

== Group B ==
=== Brazil ===
A 14-player roster was announced on 11 July 2024. Alexey Borges and Elinho Corazza were released and the final roster was announced on 23 July 2024.

Brazil men's national basketball team – 2024 Summer Olympics roster
Players
Coaches

Pos.	No.	Name	Age – Date of birth	Height	Club	Ctr.
PG	2	Yago dos Santos	25 – 9 March 1999	1.78 m (5 ft 10 in)	Crvena zvezda	(Serbia)
C	6	Cristiano Felicio	32 – 7 July 1992	2.06 m (6 ft 9 in)	Granada	(Spain)
SG	7	Didi Louzada	25 – 2 July 1999	1.96 m (6 ft 5 in)	Flamengo	(Brazil)
SG	8	Vitor Benite	34 – 20 February 1990	1.94 m (6 ft 4 in)	Palencia	(Spain)
PG	9	Marcelinho Huertas (C)	41 – 25 May 1983	1.91 m (6 ft 3 in)	Tenerife	(Spain)
SG	11	Gui Santos	22 – 22 June 2002	1.97 m (6 ft 6 in)	Golden State Warriors	(United States)
SF	14	Léo Meindl	31 – 20 March 1993	2.01 m (6 ft 7 in)	Alvark Tokyo	(Japan)
PG	23	Raul Neto	32 – 19 May 1992	1.85 m (6 ft 1 in)	Free agent
G	32	Georginho de Paula	28 – 24 May 1996	1.97 m (6 ft 6 in)	Franca	(Brazil)
F	45	Mãozinha Pereira	23 – 28 August 2000	1.98 m (6 ft 6 in)	Memphis Grizzlies	(United States)
PF	51	Bruno Caboclo	28 – 21 September 1995	2.06 m (6 ft 9 in)	Partizan	(Serbia)
PF	99	Lucas Dias	29 – 6 July 1995	2.07 m (6 ft 9 in)	Franca	(Brazil)

Head coach

- (Croatia) Aleksandar Petrovic

Assistant coach(es)

- (Brazil) Hélio Rubens Filho
- (Brazil) Bruno Savignani
- (Brazil) Tiago Splitter

Legend

- (C) Team captain
- Club – describes last
  club before the competition
- Age – describes age
  on 27 July 2024

=== France ===
A 19-player roster was announced on 16 May 2024. The final squad was announced on 7 July 2024.

France men's national basketball team – 2024 Summer Olympics roster
Players
Coaches

Pos.	No.	Name	Age – Date of birth	Height	Club	Ctr.
PG	1	Frank Ntilikina	25 – 28 July 1998	1.98 m (6 ft 6 in)	Partizan	(Serbia)
SF	5	Nicolas Batum (C)	35 – 14 December 1988	2.03 m (6 ft 8 in)	Los Angeles Clippers	(United States)
PG	6	Andrew Albicy	34 – 21 March 1990	1.78 m (5 ft 10 in)	CB Gran Canaria	(Spain)
PF	7	Guerschon Yabusele	28 – 17 December 1995	2.04 m (6 ft 8 in)	Real Madrid	(Spain)
G/F	8	Isaïa Cordinier	27 – 28 November 1996	1.96 m (6 ft 5 in)	Virtus Bologna	(Italy)
SG	10	Evan Fournier	31 – 29 October 1992	2.01 m (6 ft 7 in)	Free agent
G	12	Nando de Colo	37 – 23 June 1987	1.96 m (6 ft 5 in)	ASVEL Basket	(France)
C	26	Mathias Lessort	28 – 29 September 1995	2.06 m (6 ft 9 in)	Panathinaikos B.C.	(Greece)
C	27	Rudy Gobert	32 – 26 June 1992	2.16 m (7 ft 1 in)	Minnesota Timberwolves	(United States)
C	32	Victor Wembanyama	20 – 4 January 2004	2.22 m (7 ft 3 in)	San Antonio Spurs	(United States)
PG	85	Matthew Strazel	21 – 5 August 2002	1.84 m (6 ft 0 in)	AS Monaco	(France)
SF	99	Bilal Coulibaly	20 – 26 July 2004	2.00 m (6 ft 7 in)	Washington Wizards	(United States)

Head coach

- (France) Vincent Collet

Assistant coach(es)

- (France) Pascal Donnadieu
- (France) Ruddy Nelhomme

Legend

- (C) Team captain
- Club – describes last
  club before the competition
- Age – describes age
  on 27 July 2024

=== Germany ===
A 16-player roster was announced on 4 June 2024. The final squad was revealed on 12 July 2024.

Germany men's national basketball team – 2024 Summer Olympics roster
Players
Coaches

Pos.	No.	Name	Age – Date of birth	Height	Club	Ctr.
SF	0	Isaac Bonga	24 – 8 November 1999	2.03 m (6 ft 8 in)	Partizan	(Serbia)
PF	1	Oscar da Silva	25 – 21 September 1998	2.06 m (6 ft 9 in)	Bayern Munich	(Germany)
PG	4	Maodo Lô	31 – 31 December 1992	1.91 m (6 ft 3 in)	Olimpia Milano	(Italy)
SF	5	Niels Giffey	33 – 8 June 1991	2.00 m (6 ft 7 in)	Bayern Munich	(Germany)
G	6	Nick Weiler-Babb	28 – 12 December 1995	1.96 m (6 ft 5 in)	Bayern Munich	(Germany)
C	7	Johannes Voigtmann	31 – 30 September 1992	2.11 m (6 ft 11 in)	Olimpia Milano	(Italy)
G/F	9	Franz Wagner	22 – 27 August 2001	2.08 m (6 ft 10 in)	Orlando Magic	(United States)
F/C	10	Daniel Theis	32 – 4 April 1992	2.03 m (6 ft 8 in)	New Orleans Pelicans	(United States)
F/C	13	Moritz Wagner	27 – 26 April 1997	2.11 m (6 ft 11 in)	Orlando Magic	(United States)
PG	17	Dennis Schröder (C)	30 – 15 September 1993	1.85 m (6 ft 1 in)	Brooklyn Nets	(United States)
PF	32	Johannes Thiemann	30 – 9 February 1994	2.05 m (6 ft 9 in)	Gunma Crane Thunders	(Japan)
SG	42	Andreas Obst	28 – 13 July 1996	1.91 m (6 ft 3 in)	Bayern Munich	(Germany)

Head coach

- (Canada) / (Finland) Gordon Herbert

Assistant coach(es)

- (Germany) Klaus Perwas

Legend

- (C) Team captain
- Club – describes last
  club before the competition
- Age – describes age
  on 27 July 2024

=== Japan ===
A 16-player roster was announced on 26 June 2024. The final squad was announced on 8 July 2024.

Japan men's national basketball team – 2024 Summer Olympics roster
Players
Coaches

Pos.	No.	Name	Age – Date of birth	Height	Club	Ctr.
PG	2	Yuki Togashi (C)	30 – 30 July 1993	1.63 m (5 ft 4 in)	Chiba Jets Funabashi	(Japan)
SF	4	Akira Jacobs	20 – 13 April 2004	2.03 m (6 ft 8 in)	Hawaii Rainbow Warriors	(United States)
PG	5	Yuki Kawamura	23 – 2 May 2001	1.72 m (5 ft 8 in)	Yokohama B-Corsairs	(Japan)
SG	6	Makoto Hiejima	33 – 11 August 1990	1.91 m (6 ft 3 in)	Utsunomiya Brex	(Japan)
PG	7	Kai Toews	25 – 17 September 1998	1.88 m (6 ft 2 in)	Alvark Tokyo	(Japan)
PF	8	Rui Hachimura	26 – 8 February 1998	2.05 m (6 ft 9 in)	Los Angeles Lakers	(United States)
F	12	Yuta Watanabe	29 – 13 October 1994	2.06 m (6 ft 9 in)	Chiba Jets Funabashi	(Japan)
SG	18	Yudai Baba	28 – 7 November 1995	1.95 m (6 ft 5 in)	Nagasaki Velca	(Japan)
F/C	24	Josh Hawkinson	29 – 23 June 1995	2.08 m (6 ft 10 in)	Sun Rockers Shibuya	(Japan)
PG	30	Keisei Tominaga	23 – 1 February 2001	1.88 m (6 ft 2 in)	Indiana Pacers	(United States)
PF	34	Hugh Watanabe	25 – 23 December 1998	2.07 m (6 ft 9 in)	Ryukyu Golden Kings	(Japan)
SF	91	Hirotaka Yoshii	26 – 4 June 1998	1.96 m (6 ft 5 in)	Alvark Tokyo	(Japan)

Head coach

- (United States) Tom Hovasse

Assistant coach(es)

- (United States) Corey Gaines

Legend

- (C) Team captain
- Club – describes last
  club before the competition
- Age – describes age
  on 27 July 2024

== Group C ==
=== Puerto Rico ===
The roster was announced on 7 July 2024.

Puerto Rico men's national basketball team roster
Players
Coaches

Pos.	No.	Name	Age – Date of birth	Height	Club	Ctr.
SF	0	Isaiah Pineiro	29 – 2 February 1995	2.01 m (6 ft 7 in)	Palencia	(Spain)
F/C	1	George Conditt IV	23 – 22 August 2000	2.12 m (6 ft 11 in)	Gran Canaria	(Spain)
PG	3	Jordan Howard	28 – 6 January 1996	1.80 m (5 ft 11 in)	Obradoiro	(Spain)
SG	9	Davon Reed	29 – 11 June 1995	1.96 m (6 ft 5 in)	Memphis Hustle	(United States)
PG	10	Jose Alvarado	26 – 12 April 1998	1.83 m (6 ft 0 in)	New Orleans Pelicans	(United States)
G	11	Stevie Thompson	27 – 23 March 1997	1.94 m (6 ft 4 in)	Vaqueros de Bayamón	(Puerto Rico)
SF	12	Aleem Ford	26 – 22 December 1997	2.03 m (6 ft 8 in)	Leones de Ponce	(Puerto Rico)
G	24	Gian Clavell	30 – 26 November 1993	1.93 m (6 ft 4 in)	Granada	(Spain)
F/C	28	Ismael Romero	33 – 23 June 1991	2.03 m (6 ft 8 in)	Mets de Guaynabo	(Puerto Rico)
PF	32	Christopher Ortiz (C)	31 – 2 April 1993	2.02 m (6 ft 8 in)	Osos de Manatí	(Puerto Rico)
F/C	41	Arnaldo Toro	26 – 28 October 1997	2.02 m (6 ft 8 in)	VEF Rīga	(Latvia)
PG	51	Tremont Waters	26 – 10 January 1998	1.80 m (5 ft 11 in)	Gigantes de Carolina	(Puerto Rico)

Head coach

- (Puerto Rico) Nelson Colón

Assistant coach(es)

- (Puerto Rico) Rafael Cruz
- (Spain) David García

Legend

- (C) Team captain
- Club – describes last
  club before the tournament
- Age – describes age
  on 5 July 2024

=== Serbia ===
A 16-player roster was announced on 11 June 2024. Due to unavailability, Vladimir Lučić was replaced by Aleksa Radanov on 24 June 2024. The final squad was announced on 23 July 2024.

Serbia men's national basketball team – 2024 Summer Olympics roster
Players
Coaches

Pos.	No.	Name	Age – Date of birth	Height	Club	Ctr.
C	0	Uroš Plavšić	25 – 22 December 1998	2.16 m (7 ft 1 in)	Crvena zvezda	(Serbia)
F/C	3	Filip Petrušev	24 – 15 April 2000	2.11 m (6 ft 11 in)	Olympiacos	(Greece)
PF	5	Nikola Jović	21 – 9 June 2003	2.08 m (6 ft 10 in)	Miami Heat	(United States)
SG	7	Bogdan Bogdanović (C)	31 – 18 August 1992	1.96 m (6 ft 5 in)	Atlanta Hawks	(United States)
SG	9	Vanja Marinković	27 – 9 January 1997	1.98 m (6 ft 6 in)	Partizan	(Serbia)
SF	13	Ognjen Dobrić	29 – 27 October 1994	2.00 m (6 ft 7 in)	Crvena zvezda	(Serbia)
C	15	Nikola Jokić	29 – 19 February 1995	2.11 m (6 ft 11 in)	Denver Nuggets	(United States)
PG	22	Vasilije Micić	30 – 13 January 1994	1.95 m (6 ft 5 in)	Charlotte Hornets	(United States)
G/F	23	Marko Gudurić	29 – 8 March 1995	1.96 m (6 ft 5 in)	Fenerbahçe	(Turkey)
F	27	Dejan Davidovac	29 – 17 January 1995	2.03 m (6 ft 8 in)	Crvena zvezda	(Serbia)
PG	30	Aleksa Avramović	29 – 25 October 1994	1.92 m (6 ft 4 in)	Partizan	(Serbia)
C	33	Nikola Milutinov	29 – 30 December 1994	2.13 m (7 ft 0 in)	Olympiacos	(Greece)

Head coach

- (Serbia) Svetislav Pešić

Assistant coach(es)

- (Serbia) Oliver Kostić
- (Serbia) Saša Kosović
- (Serbia) Marko Marinović
- (Serbia) Ognjen Stojaković
- (Serbia) Nenad Jakovljević

Legend

- (C) Team captain
- Club – describes last
  club before the tournament
- Age – describes age
  on 27 July 2024

Roster

=== South Sudan ===
A 50-player roster was announced on 30 April 2024. It was cut to 25 players on 3 June 2024. The roster was announced on 24 July 2024.

South Sudan men's national basketball team – 2024 Olympics roster
Players
Coaches

Pos.	No.	Name	Age – Date of birth	Height	Club	Ctr.
PG	4	Carlik Jones	26 – 23 December 1997	1.83 m (6 ft 0 in)	Partizan	(Serbia)
F	5	Nuni Omot	29 – 3 October 1994	2.06 m (6 ft 9 in)	Ningbo Rockets	(China)
C	6	Khaman Maluach	17 – 14 September 2006	2.16 m (7 ft 1 in)	Duke Blue Devils	(United States)
SF	7	Bul Kuol	27 – 10 January 1997	2.04 m (6 ft 8 in)	Sydney Kings	(Australia)
SF	8	Kuany Kuany (C)	30 – 8 July 1994	2.01 m (6 ft 7 in)	Free agent
F/C	9	Wenyen Gabriel	27 – 26 March 1997	2.06 m (6 ft 9 in)	Maccabi Tel Aviv	(Israel)
PF	10	JT Thor	21 – 26 August 2002	2.10 m (6 ft 11 in)	Charlotte Hornets	(United States)
SG	11	Marial Shayok	29 – 26 July 1995	1.98 m (6 ft 6 in)	Shandong Hi-Speed Kirin	(China)
PG	12	Jackson Makoi	24 – 3 July 2000	1.93 m (6 ft 4 in)	Cairns Taipans	(Australia)
PF	13	Majok Deng	31 – 1 March 1993	2.05 m (6 ft 9 in)	Tasmania JackJumpers	(Australia)
SG	14	Peter Jok	30 – 30 March 1994	1.98 m (6 ft 6 in)	Ottawa BlackJacks	(Canada)
G	15	Sunday Dech	30 – 1 January 1994	1.95 m (6 ft 5 in)	East Perth Eagles	(Australia)

Head coach

- (United States) Royal Ivey

Assistant coach(es)

- (South Sudan) / (United Kingdom) Luol Deng
- (Nigeria) Fortune Solomon

Legend

- (C) Team captain
- Club – describes last
  club before the tournament
- Age – describes age
  on 27 July 2024

=== United States ===
The roster was announced on 17 April 2024. On July 10, 2024, Kawhi Leonard withdrew from the team due to injury and was replaced by Derrick White.

United States men's national basketball team – 2024 Summer Olympics roster
Players
Coaches

Pos.	No.	Name	Age – Date of birth	Height	Club	Ctr.
PG	4	Stephen Curry	36 – 14 March 1988	1.88 m (6 ft 2 in)	Golden State Warriors	(United States)
SG	5	Anthony Edwards	22 – 5 August 2001	1.93 m (6 ft 4 in)	Minnesota Timberwolves	(United States)
F	6	LeBron James (C)	39 – 30 December 1984	2.06 m (6 ft 9 in)	Los Angeles Lakers	(United States)
F	7	Kevin Durant	35 – 29 September 1988	2.11 m (6 ft 11 in)	Phoenix Suns	(United States)
G	8	Derrick White	30 – 2 July 1994	1.93 m (6 ft 4 in)	Boston Celtics	(United States)
PG	9	Tyrese Haliburton	24 – 29 February 2000	1.96 m (6 ft 5 in)	Indiana Pacers	(United States)
F	10	Jayson Tatum	26 – 3 March 1998	2.03 m (6 ft 8 in)	Boston Celtics	(United States)
C	11	Joel Embiid	30 – 16 March 1994	2.13 m (7 ft 0 in)	Philadelphia 76ers	(United States)
G	12	Jrue Holiday	34 – 12 June 1990	1.93 m (6 ft 4 in)	Boston Celtics	(United States)
F/C	13	Bam Adebayo	27 – 18 July 1997	2.06 m (6 ft 9 in)	Miami Heat	(United States)
F/C	14	Anthony Davis	31 – 11 March 1993	2.08 m (6 ft 10 in)	Los Angeles Lakers	(United States)
SG	15	Devin Booker	27 – 30 October 1996	1.98 m (6 ft 6 in)	Phoenix Suns	(United States)

Head coach

- (United States) Steve Kerr

Assistant coach(es)

- (United States) Mark Few
- (United States) Tyronn Lue
- (United States) Erik Spoelstra

Legend

- (C) Team captain
- Club – describes last
  club before the tournament
- Age – describes age
  on 27 July 2024

Roster
