= Basketball at the 2012 Summer Olympics – Men's qualification =

The basketball qualification for the Summer Olympics men's basketball tournament occurred from 2010 to 2012; all five FIBA (International Basketball Federation) zones sent in teams.

The first qualifying tournament was the 2010 FIBA World Championship in which the champion was guaranteed of a place in the Olympics. Throughout the next two years, several regional tournaments served as qualification for the zonal tournaments, which doubled as intercontinental championships, to determine which teams would participate in the 2012 London Summer Olympics.

== Qualification ==
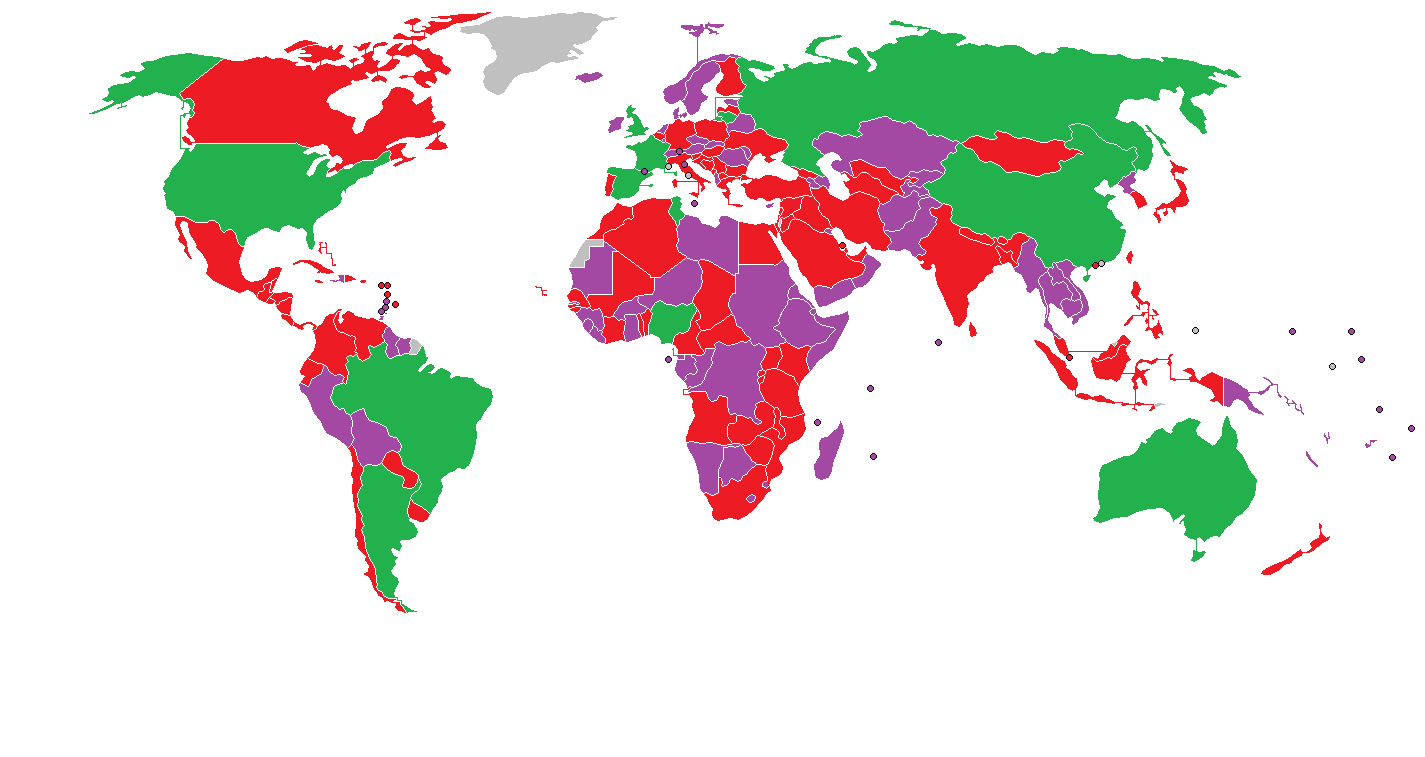
Current qualifying situation.

=== Outright qualification ===
A total of 12 teams took part in the Olympics, with each NOC sending in one team. The host nation (Great Britain) qualified automatically as hosts.

There were a total of 5 zonal tournaments (doubling as intercontinental championships) that determined the qualifying teams, with a total of 7 teams qualifying outright. Each zone was allocated with the following qualifying berths:

- FIBA Africa: 1 team (Champion)
- FIBA Americas: 2 teams (Champion and runner-up)
- FIBA Asia: 1 team (Champion)
- FIBA Europe: 2 teams (Champion and runner-up)
- FIBA Oceania: 1 team (Champion)

Furthermore, the current world champion, United States qualified automatically by winning at the 2010 FIBA World Championship.

=== Qualification via the wild card tournament ===
The additional three teams were determined at the 2012 FIBA World Olympic Qualifying Tournament for Men, with the best non-qualifying teams participating from teams that did not qualify outright. Each zone was allocated with the following berths:

- FIBA Africa: 2 teams
- FIBA Americas: 3 teams
- FIBA Asia: 2 teams
- FIBA Europe: 4 teams
- FIBA Oceania: 1 team

== Summary ==
Qualified for the Olympics outright
Qualified automatically
Qualified for the wild card tournament

These are the final standings of the different Olympic qualifying tournaments. The venues are as follows, with the city of the knockout stage mentioned first:

- 2010 FIBA World Championship: Turkey
- AfroBasket 2011: Madagascar
- 2011 FIBA Americas Championship: Argentina
- 2011 FIBA Asia Championship: China
- EuroBasket 2011: Lithuania
- 2011 FIBA Oceania Championship: Australia
- 2012 FIBA World Olympic Qualifying Tournament for Men: Venezuela

Rank	World	Africa	Americas	Asia	Europe	Oceania	Wild card
1st	United States	Tunisia	Argentina	China	Spain	Australia	Lithuania; Russia; Ranked 1st
2nd	Turkey	Angola	Brazil	Jordan	France	New Zealand	Lithuania; Russia; Ranked 1st
3rd	Lithuania	Nigeria	Dominican Republic	South Korea	Russia		Nigeria
4th	Serbia	Ivory Coast	Puerto Rico	Philippines	North Macedonia		Dominican Republic
5th	Argentina	Senegal	Venezuela	Iran	Lithuania		Angola; Greece; North Macedonia; Puerto Rico; Ranked 5th
6th	Spain	C.A.R.	Canada	Lebanon	Greece		Angola; Greece; North Macedonia; Puerto Rico; Ranked 5th
7th	Russia	Cameroon	Uruguay	Japan	Slovenia		Angola; Greece; North Macedonia; Puerto Rico; Ranked 5th
8th	Slovenia	Morocco	Panama	Chinese Taipei	Serbia		Angola; Greece; North Macedonia; Puerto Rico; Ranked 5th
9th	Brazil	Mali	Paraguay	Syria	Germany; Finland; Ranked 9th		Jordan; Venezuela; South Korea; New Zealand; Ranked 9th
10th	Australia	Mozambique	Cuba	United Arab Emirates	Germany; Finland; Ranked 9th		Jordan; Venezuela; South Korea; New Zealand; Ranked 9th
11th	Greece	Egypt		Malaysia	Turkey; Georgia; Ranked 11th		Jordan; Venezuela; South Korea; New Zealand; Ranked 9th
12th	New Zealand	Rwanda		Uzbekistan	Turkey; Georgia; Ranked 11th		Jordan; Venezuela; South Korea; New Zealand; Ranked 9th
13th	France	Madagascar		Indonesia	Croatia; Bulgaria; Great Britain; Israel; Ranked 13th		
14th	Croatia	South Africa		India	Croatia; Bulgaria; Great Britain; Israel; Ranked 13th		
15th	Angola	Chad		Bahrain	Croatia; Bulgaria; Great Britain; Israel; Ranked 13th		
16th	China	Togo		Qatar	Croatia; Bulgaria; Great Britain; Israel; Ranked 13th		
17th	Germany				Ukraine; Poland; Bosnia and Herzegovina; Italy; Ranked 17th		
18th	Puerto Rico				Ukraine; Poland; Bosnia and Herzegovina; Italy; Ranked 17th		
19th	Iran				Ukraine; Poland; Bosnia and Herzegovina; Italy; Ranked 17th		
20th	Lebanon				Ukraine; Poland; Bosnia and Herzegovina; Italy; Ranked 17th		
21st	Ivory Coast				Montenegro; Latvia; Belgium; Portugal; Ranked 21st		
22nd	Canada				Montenegro; Latvia; Belgium; Portugal; Ranked 21st		
23rd	Jordan				Montenegro; Latvia; Belgium; Portugal; Ranked 21st		
24th	Tunisia				Montenegro; Latvia; Belgium; Portugal; Ranked 21st		
