= Basketball at the 2008 Summer Olympics – Men's qualification =

The basketball qualification for the Summer Olympics men's basketball tournament occurred from 2006–2008; all five FIBA (International Basketball Federation) zones sent in teams.

The first qualifying tournament was the 2006 FIBA World Championship in which the champion was guaranteed of a place in the Olympics. Throughout the next two years, several regional tournaments served as qualification for the zonal tournaments, which doubles as intercontinental championships, to determine which teams will participate in the 2008 Beijing Summer Olympics.

== Qualification ==
=== Outright qualification ===
A total of 12 teams will take part in the Olympics, with each NOC sending in one team. The host nation (the People's Republic of China) qualifies automatically as hosts.

There are a total of 5 zonal tournaments (doubling as intercontinental championships) that determined the qualifying teams, with a total of 7 teams qualifying outright. Each zone was allocated with the following qualifying berths:

- FIBA Africa: 1 team (Champion)
- FIBA Americas: 2 teams (Champion and runner-up)
- FIBA Asia: 1 team (Champion)
- FIBA Europe: 2 teams (Champion and runner-up)
- FIBA Oceania: 1 team (Champion)

Furthermore, the current world champion, Spain qualified automatically by winning at the 2006 FIBA World Championship.

=== Qualification via the wildcard tournament ===
The additional three teams will be determined at the FIBA World Olympic Qualifying Tournament 2008, with the best non-qualifying teams participating from teams that did not qualify outright. Each zone is allocated with the following berths:

- FIBA Africa: 2 teams
- FIBA Americas: 3 teams
- FIBA Asia: 2 teams
- FIBA Europe: 4 teams
- FIBA Oceania: 1 team

== Summary ==
Qualified for the Olympics outright
Qualified automatically
Qualified for the Wildcard Tournament

These are the final standings of the different Olympic qualifying tournaments. The venues are as follows, with the city of the knockout stage mentioned first:

- 2006 FIBA World Championship: Saitama, Hiroshima, Hamamatsu, Sapporo, Sendai (Japan)
- FIBA Africa Championship 2007: Luanda, Benguela, Huambo, Lubango, Cabinda (Angola)
- FIBA Americas Championship 2007: Las Vegas (United States)
- FIBA Asia Championship 2007: Tokushima (Japan)
- EuroBasket 2007: Madrid, Alicante, Granada, Palma, Seville (Spain)
- FIBA Oceania Championship 2007: Melbourne, Sydney, Boondall (Australia)
- FIBA World Olympic Qualifying Tournament 2008: Athens (Greece)

Rank	World	Africa	Americas	Asia	Europe	Oceania	Wildcard
1st	Spain	Angola	United States	Iran	Russia	Australia	Croatia; Greece; Ranked 1st
2nd	Greece	Cameroon	Argentina	Lebanon	Spain	New Zealand	Croatia; Greece; Ranked 1st
3rd	United States	Cape Verde	Puerto Rico	South Korea	Lithuania		Germany
4th	Argentina	Egypt	Brazil	Kazakhstan	Greece		Puerto Rico
5th	France	Nigeria	Canada	Jordan	Germany		New Zealand; Brazil; Slovenia; Canada; Ranked 5th
6th	Turkey	Tunisia	Uruguay	Chinese Taipei	Croatia		New Zealand; Brazil; Slovenia; Canada; Ranked 5th
7th	Lithuania	C.A.R.	Mexico	Qatar	Slovenia		New Zealand; Brazil; Slovenia; Canada; Ranked 5th
8th	Germany	Ivory Coast	Venezuela	Japan	France		New Zealand; Brazil; Slovenia; Canada; Ranked 5th
9th	Italy; Angola; Serbia and Montenegro; Slovenia; Australia; Nigeria; China; New Zealand; Ranked 9th	Senegal	Panama	Philippines	Israel; Italy; Portugal; Turkey; Ranked 9th		Lebanon; Cape Verde; South Korea; Cameroon; Ranked 9th
10th	Italy; Angola; Serbia and Montenegro; Slovenia; Australia; Nigeria; China; New Zealand; Ranked 9th	Morocco	Virgin Islands	China	Israel; Italy; Portugal; Turkey; Ranked 9th		Lebanon; Cape Verde; South Korea; Cameroon; Ranked 9th
11th	Italy; Angola; Serbia and Montenegro; Slovenia; Australia; Nigeria; China; New Zealand; Ranked 9th	Mali		Syria	Israel; Italy; Portugal; Turkey; Ranked 9th		Lebanon; Cape Verde; South Korea; Cameroon; Ranked 9th
12th	Italy; Angola; Serbia and Montenegro; Slovenia; Australia; Nigeria; China; New Zealand; Ranked 9th	Rwanda		Indonesia	Israel; Italy; Portugal; Turkey; Ranked 9th		Lebanon; Cape Verde; South Korea; Cameroon; Ranked 9th
13th	Italy; Angola; Serbia and Montenegro; Slovenia; Australia; Nigeria; China; New Zealand; Ranked 9th	South Africa		Hong Kong	Czech Rep. Latvia; Poland; Serbia; Ranked 13th		
14th	Italy; Angola; Serbia and Montenegro; Slovenia; Australia; Nigeria; China; New Zealand; Ranked 9th	Mozambique		Kuwait	Czech Rep. Latvia; Poland; Serbia; Ranked 13th		
15th	Italy; Angola; Serbia and Montenegro; Slovenia; Australia; Nigeria; China; New Zealand; Ranked 9th	DR Congo		India	Czech Rep. Latvia; Poland; Serbia; Ranked 13th		
16th	Italy; Angola; Serbia and Montenegro; Slovenia; Australia; Nigeria; China; New Zealand; Ranked 9th	Liberia		UAE	Czech Rep. Latvia; Poland; Serbia; Ranked 13th		
17th =	Puerto Rico; Lebanon; Brazil; Japan						
21st =	Venezuela; Senegal; Panama; Qatar						

== FIBA Africa ==
The FIBA Africa Championship 2007 at Angola determined FIBA Africa's only outright representative to the Olympics and two wildcard participants.

The tournament is structured into a preliminary round of 16 teams divided into 4 groups; the top two teams from each group advance to the knockout stages (quarterfinals, semifinals and final).

Angola won the tournament, beating Cameroon in the final, 86-72. Cape Verde defeated Egypt by 2 points, 53-51 to join Cameroon in the wildcard tournament.

== FIBA Americas ==
The 2007 FIBA Americas Championship held in the Thomas & Mack Center at Las Vegas, Nevada determined the two teams representing FIBA Americas in the Olympics.

The tournament is structured into a preliminary round of ten teams divided into 2 groups; the bottom team from each group is eliminated in the quarterfinals, where results between groupmates carry over. The Top four teams advance to the semifinals. The fifth-best team in the quarterfinals qualifies for the Olympics.

Hosts United States won the tournament, defeating Argentina 118–81 in the final. Puerto Rico and Brazil, the other semifinalists, and Canada the fifth-place team (tied for fourth at the quarterfinals but was beaten by Puerto Rico 72–66 in the last day of the quarterfinals to win the tiebreaker) qualify for the wildcard tournament.

== FIBA Asia ==
With China automatically qualified, a much weaker team (without Yao Ming and Wang Zhizhi) leaves the race wide open for FIBA Asia's Olympic berth. The tournament held in Tokushima, Japan is structured with a preliminary round of 16 teams divided into four groups, with the top two teams advancing to the quarterfinals, where they'll be divided into two groups. The top two teams in the quarterfinals groups advance to the knockout semifinals and finals.

China's early elimination in the preliminary round (their worst performance in the Asian Championships) simplified the implications: only the winner will advance outright to the Olympics. That winner was Iran which defeated Lebanon 74-69 in the final. Korea escaped Kazakhstan 80-76 to join Lebanon in the wildcard tournament.

== FIBA Europe ==
Although Spain automatically qualified, they sent in their "A" team, considering EuroBasket 2007 was held in their homeland.

The tournament was divided into five rounds: the preliminary round where 16 teams are divided into 4 groups, the qualifying round, where bottom team from the prelims are eliminated, while the teams are reassigned into two 6-team groups, with results between teams that played already carried over, then the knockout stages (quarterfinals up to the final) where the top 4 teams in the qualifying round groups advance.

Spain survived into the final, where they were beaten by Russia, 60–59, which qualified outright to the Olympics. The other outright berth was decided in the third-place game, where Lithuania beat Greece, 78–69. The wildcard qualifiers are Greece, Germany, Croatia and Slovenia, which defeated France in the 7th place game, 88–74, for the last wildcard berth.

== FIBA Oceania ==
With only Australia and New Zealand participating in the FIBA Oceania Championship 2007, FIBA Oceania's Olympic berth was decided in a best-of-three series played in Australia.

Australia won the first two games, rendering the third game inconsequential, which the Tall Blacks won. New Zealand qualified to the wildcard tournament.

== Qualified teams ==
After the end of wildcard tournament, the twelve teams that qualified for Beijing 2008 are:

- Angola
- Argentina
- Australia
- China
- Croatia
- Germany
- Greece
- Iran
- Lithuania
- Russia
- Spain
- United States

The italicized teams are the wildcards.
