= Ognjen Stojaković =

Serbian basketball coach (born 1981)

Denver Nuggets
- Positions: Director Player Development; Assistant Coach
- League: NBA

Personal information
- Born: September 29, 1981 (age 45) Belgrade, SR Serbia, SFR Yugoslavia
- Coaching career: 2004–present

Career history

Coaching
- 2004–2011: FMP (youth)
- 2013–2016: Denver Nuggets (video coordinator)
- 2016–2018: Denver Nuggets (assistant)
- 2018–2022: Denver Nuggets (player development)
- 2022–present: Denver Nuggets (assistant)

Career highlights
- As assistant coach: NBA champion (2023); NBA All-Star Game (2023)

Ognjen "Ogi" Stojaković (Serbian Cyrillic: Огњен Стојаковић; born September 29, 1981) is a Serbian professional basketball coach, currently working as the director of player development and an assistant coach for the Denver Nuggets of the National Basketball Association (NBA).

== Coaching career ==
Stojaković began his coaching career with FMP in Belgrade, Serbia. In August 2004, Stojaković became the youth system coach. After nearly 7 years, he left FMP at the end of the 2010–11 season.

=== Denver Nuggets (2013–present) ===
Stojaković began working with the Denver Nuggets prior to the 2013–14 NBA season, serving as the assistant video coordinator for three seasons. At the start of the 2016–17 NBA season he was promoted to assistant coach for player development. Prior to the 2019–20 NBA season, he was promoted to director of player development. At the 2023 NBA All-Star Game, he was an assistant coach for Team LeBron under Nuggets' head coach Michael Malone. Stojaković won an NBA championship when the Nuggets defeated the Miami Heat in the 2023 NBA Finals.

== See also ==
- List of Serbian NBA coaches
- List of foreign NBA coaches
