= EuroBasket 2017 final =

Championship game of EuroBasket 2017

EuroBasket 2017 Final
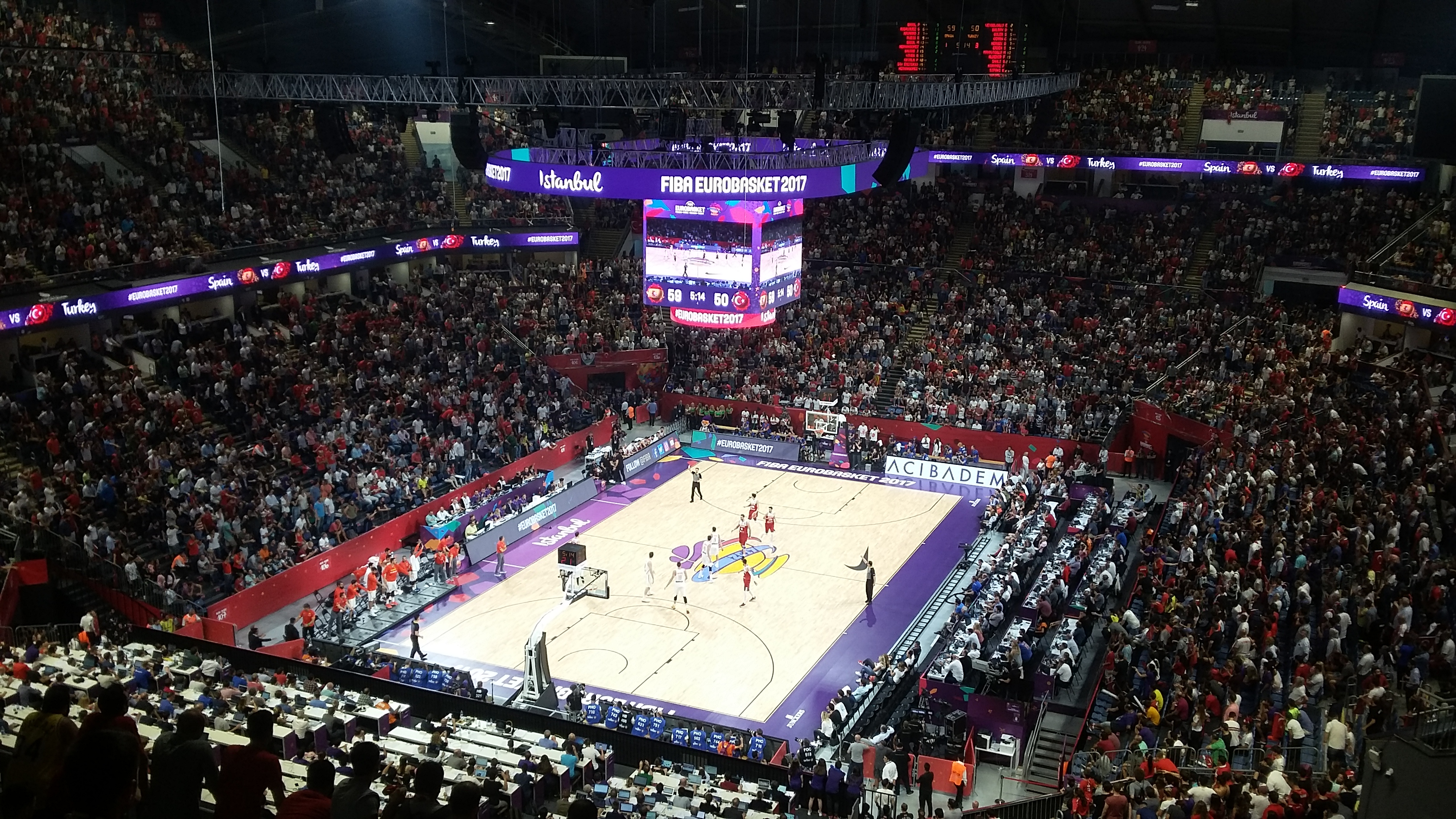
- The Sinan Erdem Dome hosted the Final
Slovenia	Serbia
(Slovenia)	(Serbia)
93	85
	1	2	3	4	Total
Slovenia	20	36	15	22	93
Serbia	22	25	20	18	85
- Date: 17 September 2017
- Venue: Sinan Erdem Dome, Istanbul
- Referees: Cristiano Maranho (Brazil); Antonio Conde (Spain); Tolga Sahin (Turkey)
- Attendance: 12,095

The EuroBasket 2017 Final was the championship game of the EuroBasket 2017 tournament. The game took place on 17 September 2017 in the Sinan Erdem Dome, Istanbul.

Slovenia, who defeated Spain in the semi-finals to reach the EuroBasket Final for the first time, met Serbia, the European runner-up from 2009, who defeated Russia in the semi-finals. Serbian team captain Milan Mačvan is the only player who played EuroBasket 2009 Final. Behind 35 points from Goran Dragić, who had announced his retirement from international play prior to the tournament, Slovenia won the final 93–85 and clinched their first ever EuroBasket championship.

It was the first EuroBasket Final in which both head coaches came from the same country. Slovenian team head coach Igor Kokoškov was coaching against his home country of Serbia.

== Road to the final ==
Slovenia		Round	Serbia	
Opponent	Result		Opponent	Result
Poland	90–81	Game 1	Latvia	92–82
Finland	81–78	Game 2	Russia	72–75
Greece	78–72	Game 3	Turkey	80–74
Iceland	102–75	Game 4	Great Britain	82–68
France	95–78	Game 5	Belgium	74–54
Pos / Team / Pld / W / L / PF / PA / PD / Pts / Qualification; 1 / Slovenia / 5 / 5 / 0 / 446 / 384 / +62 / 10 / Knockout stage; 2 / Finland (H) / 5 / 4 / 1 / 426 / 408 / +18 / 9 / Knockout stage; 3 / France / 5 / 3 / 2 / 450 / 422 / +28 / 8 / Knockout stage; 4 / Greece / 5 / 2 / 3 / 421 / 400 / +21 / 7 / Knockout stage; 5 / Poland / 5 / 1 / 4 / 411 / 414 / −3 / 6; 6 / Iceland / 5 / 0 / 5 / 355 / 481 / −126 / 5; Source: EuroBasket; Rules for classification: 1) Points. 2) Head-to-head results. 3) Points difference. 4) Points scored. (H) Hosts		Preliminary Round	Pos / Team / Pld / W / L / PF / PA / PD / Pts / Qualification; 1 / Serbia / 5 / 4 / 1 / 400 / 353 / +47 / 9 (Note: Serbia 3 Pts, +7 PD; Latvia 3 Pts, +5 PD; Russia 3 Pts, −12 PD) / Knockout stage; 2 / Latvia / 5 / 4 / 1 / 444 / 396 / +48 / 9 / Knockout stage; 3 / Russia / 5 / 4 / 1 / 378 / 366 / +12 / 9 / Knockout stage; 4 / Turkey (H) / 5 / 2 / 3 / 388 / 380 / +8 / 7 / Knockout stage; 5 / Belgium / 5 / 1 / 4 / 353 / 410 / −57 / 6; 6 / Great Britain / 5 / 0 / 5 / 390 / 448 / −58 / 5; Source: EuroBasket; Rules for classification: 1) Points; 2) Head-to-head results; 3) Points difference; 4) Points scored. (H) Hosts; Notes:	
Opponent	Result	Knockout stage	Opponent	Result
Ukraine	79–55	Round of 16	Hungary	86–78
Latvia	103–97	Quarterfinals	Italy	83–67
Spain	92–72	Semifinals	Russia	87–79

== Match details ==
This game was the sixth time Slovenia and Serbia met at a EuroBasket tournament, including games in which Serbia played as the FR Yugoslavia. In the fourth quarter, Serbia led 82–80 with 3:30 minutes to go in the game. Slovenia went on a 12–0 run Slovenian guard Goran Dragić scored 35 points on 12-22 shooting, which was the most points scored in a final since Pau Gasol with 36 in 2003. Following his performance, Dragić was given the Most Valuable Player award of the tournament after averaging 22.6 points in 9 games.

Slovenia won its first ever European title in surprising fashion, as odd makers favored Serbia and seven other teams over Slovenia to win the EuroBasket title. Slovenia finished the tournament 9–0 and thus unbeaten, which was the first time since Lithuania went 6–0 in 2003.

17 September 2017	Slovenia	93–85	Serbia	Sinan Erdem Dome, Istanbul
21:30 UTC+3 (GMT+3)	Scoring by quarter: 20–22, 36–25, 15–20, 22–18
	Pts: Dragić 35; Rebs: Dragić, Dončić 7 Asts: Dragić, Prepelič 3	Boxscore	Pts: Bogdanović 22; Rebs: Lučić 8 Asts: Bogdanović 5	Attendance: 12,095; Referees: Cristiano Maranho (Brazil), Tolga Sahin (Italy), Antonio Conde (Spain)

Slovenia	Serbia

Starters:			Pts	Reb	Ast
PG	3	Goran Dragić	35	7	3
SG	11	Jaka Blažič	7	3	2
SF	8	Edo Murić	5	1	0
G	77	Luka Dončić	8	7	2
C	14	Gašper Vidmar	2	5	0
Reserves:					
PF	0	Anthony Randolph	11	4	2
PG	1	Matic Rebec	DNP		
PG	6	Aleksej Nikolić	4	3	2
SG	7	Klemen Prepelič	21	4	3
PF	17	Saša Zagorac	0	0	0
C	22	Žiga Dimec	0	1	0
SF	31	Vlatko Čančar	0	0	0
Head coach:
(Basketball Federation of Serbia) Igor Kokoškov

2017 European champions

Slovenia
1st title

Starters:			Pts	Reb	Ast
G	24	Stefan Jović	2	0	2
SG	7	Bogdan Bogdanović	22	4	5
F	11	Vladimir Lučić	9	8	2
PF	6	Milan Mačvan	18	5	3
C	32	Ognjen Kuzmić	6	1	0
Reserves:					
SG	12	Dragan Milosavljević	2	1	0
PF	14	Stefan Birčević	8	5	0
C	15	Vladimir Štimac	2	1	0
G/F	19	Branko Lazić	DNP		
PG	22	Vasilije Micić	4	1	3
G/F	23	Marko Gudurić	6	1	0
C	51	Boban Marjanović	6	3	1
Head coach:
(Basketball Federation of Serbia) Aleksandar Đorđević

== Rosters ==
=== Slovenia ===
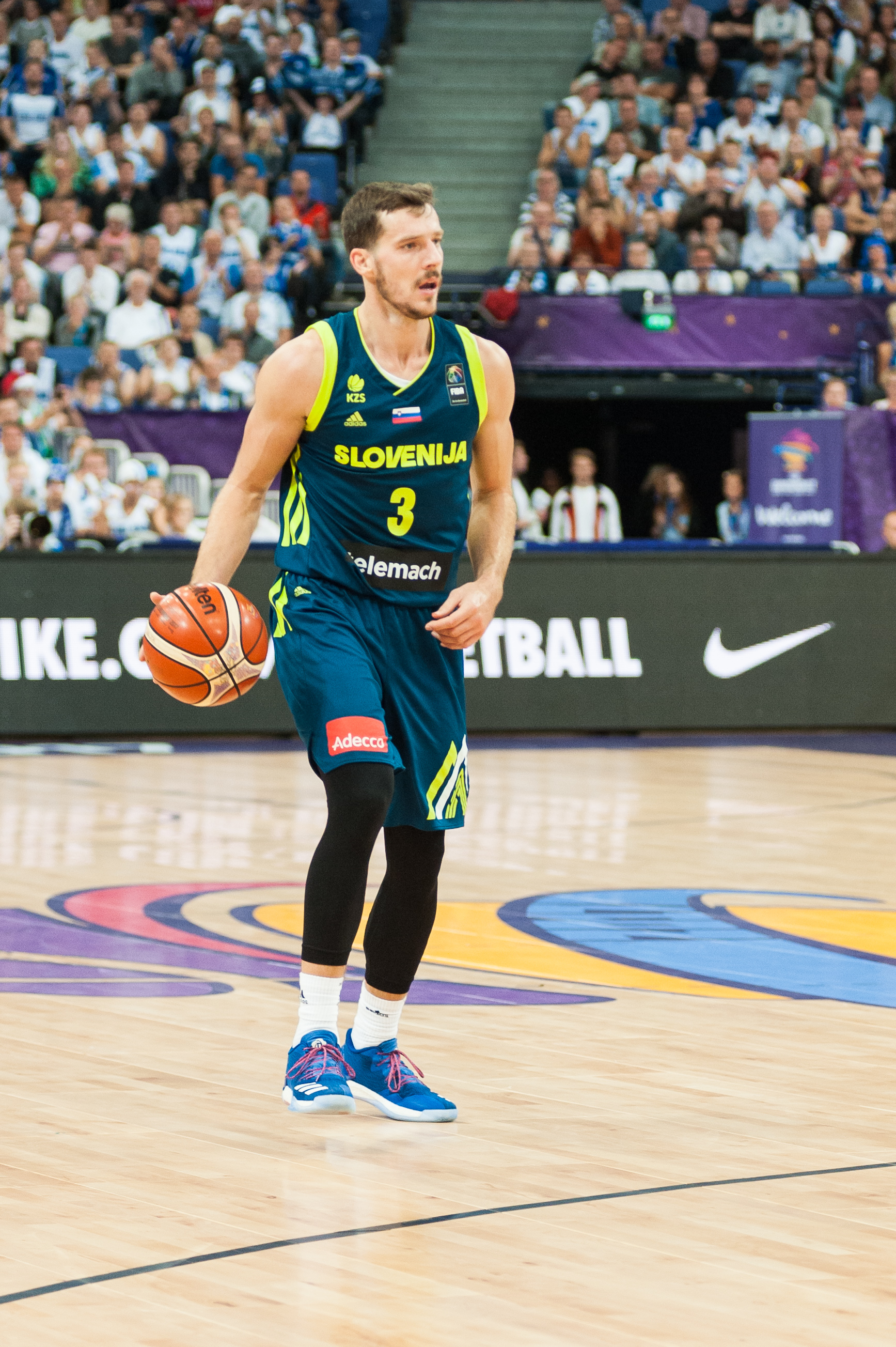
Slovenian guard Goran Dragić led the game in scoring, with 35 points

The following is the squad in the EuroBasket 2017.

Slovenia men's national basketball team roster
Players
Coaches

Pos.	No.	Name	Age – Date of birth	Height	Club	Ctr.
PF	0	Anthony Randolph	28 – 15 July 1989	2.11 m (6 ft 11 in)	Real Madrid	(Spain)
PG	1	Matic Rebec	22 – 24 January 1995	1.80 m (5 ft 11 in)	Krka	(Slovenia)
PG	3	Goran Dragić (C)	31 – 6 May 1986	1.91 m (6 ft 3 in)	Miami Heat	(United States)
PG	6	Aleksej Nikolić	22 – 21 February 1995	1.91 m (6 ft 3 in)	Brose Bamberg	(Germany)
SG	7	Klemen Prepelič	24 – 20 October 1992	1.91 m (6 ft 3 in)	Limoges CSP	(France)
SF	8	Edo Murić	25 – 27 November 1991	2.02 m (6 ft 8 in)	Banvit	(Turkey)
SG	11	Jaka Blažič	27 – 30 June 1990	1.96 m (6 ft 5 in)	Baskonia	(Spain)
C	14	Gašper Vidmar	29 – 14 September 1987	2.11 m (6 ft 11 in)	Banvit	(Turkey)
PF	17	Saša Zagorac	33 – 1 January 1984	2.06 m (6 ft 9 in)	Parma Basket	(Russia)
C	22	Žiga Dimec	24 – 20 February 1993	2.11 m (6 ft 11 in)	Krka	(Slovenia)
SF	31	Vlatko Čančar	20 – 10 April 1997	2.03 m (6 ft 8 in)	Mega Leks	(Serbia)
G	77	Luka Dončić	18 – 28 February 1999	2.01 m (6 ft 7 in)	Real Madrid	(Spain)

Head coach

- (Serbia) Igor Kokoškov

Assistant coach(es)

- (Slovenia) Aleksander Sekulić
- (Slovenia) Jaka Lakovič
- (Slovenia) Rado Trifunović

Legend

- (C) Team captain
- Club – describes last
  club before the tournament
- Age – describes age
  on 31 August 2017

=== Serbia ===
The following is the Serbia roster for the EuroBasket 2017

Serbia men's national basketball team – EuroBasket 2017 roster
Players
Coaches

Pos.	No.	Name	Age – Date of birth	Height	Club	Ctr.
PF	6	Milan Mačvan (C)	27 – November 16, 1989	2.06 m (6 ft 9 in)	Olimpia Milano	(Italy)
SG	7	Bogdan Bogdanović	25 – August 18, 1992	1.98 m (6 ft 6 in)	Fenerbahçe	(Turkey)
F	11	Vladimir Lučić	28 – June 17, 1989	2.04 m (6 ft 8 in)	Bayern Munich	(Germany)
SG	12	Dragan Milosavljević	28 – May 11, 1989	1.98 m (6 ft 6 in)	Alba Berlin	(Germany)
PF	14	Stefan Birčević	27 – December 13, 1989	2.10 m (6 ft 11 in)	Partizan	(Serbia)
C	15	Vladimir Štimac	29 – September 25, 1987	2.11 m (6 ft 11 in)	Beşiktaş J.K.	(Turkey)
G/F	19	Branko Lazić	28 – January 12, 1989	1.95 m (6 ft 5 in)	Crvena zvezda	(Serbia)
PG	22	Vasilije Micić	23 – January 13, 1994	1.95 m (6 ft 5 in)	Tofaş	(Turkey)
G/F	23	Marko Gudurić	22 – March 8, 1995	1.99 m (6 ft 6 in)	Crvena zvezda	(Serbia)
G	24	Stefan Jović	26 – November 3, 1990	1.98 m (6 ft 6 in)	Crvena zvezda	(Serbia)
C	32	Ognjen Kuzmić	27 – May 16, 1990	2.13 m (7 ft 0 in)	Crvena zvezda	(Serbia)
C	51	Boban Marjanović	29 – August 15, 1988	2.21 m (7 ft 3 in)	Detroit Pistons	(United States)

Head coach

- (Serbia) Aleksandar Đorđević

Assistant coach(es)

- (Serbia) Miroslav Nikolić
- (Serbia) Jovica Antonić
- (Serbia) Milan Minić

Legend

- (C) Team captain
- Club – describes last
  club before the tournament
- Age – describes age
  on 31 August 2017
