= EuroBasket 2017 knockout stage =

The knockout stage of the EuroBasket 2017 took place between 9 September and 17 September 2017. All games were played at the Sinan Erdem Dome in Istanbul, Turkey.

== Qualified teams ==
Group	Winners	Runners-up	Third place	Fourth place
A	Slovenia	Finland	France	Greece
B	Lithuania	Germany	Italy	Ukraine
C	Spain	Croatia	Montenegro	Hungary
D	Serbia	Latvia	Russia	Turkey

== Bracket ==
Round of 16
9 September
Germany	84
France	81
10 September
Spain	73
Turkey	56
9 September
Slovenia	79
Ukraine	55
10 September
Latvia	100
Montenegro	68
9 September
Lithuania	64
Greece	77
10 September
Croatia	78
Russia	101
9 September
Finland	57
Italy	70
10 September
Serbia	86
Hungary	78

Quarterfinals
12 September
Germany	72
Spain	84
12 September
Slovenia	103
Latvia	97
13 September
Greece	69
Russia	74
13 September
Italy	67
Serbia	83

Semifinals
14 September
Spain	72
Slovenia	92
15 September
Russia	79
Serbia	87

Final
17 September
Slovenia	93
Serbia	85
Third place
17 September
Spain	93
Russia	85

All times are local (UTC+3).

== Round of 16 ==
=== Slovenia v Ukraine ===
9 September 2017
12:30

Boxscore

Slovenia	79–55	Ukraine
Scoring by quarter: 26–17, 16–10, 26–16, 11–12
Pts: Randolph 21; Rebs: Dončić 10; Asts: Dončić 6		Pts: Pustozvonov 11; Rebs: Pustovyi 10; Asts: Kravtsov, Lukashov 4

Sinan Erdem Dome, Istanbul
Attendance: 730
Referees: Cristiano Maranho (BRA), Panagiotis Anastopoulos (GRE), Tolga Sahin (ITA)

=== Germany v France ===
9 September 2017
15:15

Boxscore

Germany	84–81	France
Scoring by quarter: 10–19, 24–21, 21–16, 29–25
Pts: Theis 22; Rebs: Theis 7 Asts: Schröder 8		Pts: Fournier 27; Rebs: Diaw 9 Asts: Diaw 5

Sinan Erdem Dome, Istanbul
Attendance: 1,060
Referees: Manuel Mazzoni (ITA), Leandro Lezcano (ARG), Saša Maričić (SRB)

=== Finland v Italy ===
9 September 2017
18:45

Boxscore

Finland	57–70	Italy
Scoring by quarter: 17–30, 12–18, 13–10, 15–12
Pts: Koponen 13; Rebs: Salin 8 Asts: Rannikko 3		Pts: Belinelli 22; Rebs: Hackett 6 Asts: Melli 3

Sinan Erdem Dome, Istanbul
Attendance: 1,411
Referees: Antonio Conde (ESP), Mārtiņš Kozlovskis (LAT), Ademir Zurapović (BIH)

=== Lithuania v Greece ===
9 September 2017
21:30

Boxscore

Lithuania	64–77	Greece
Scoring by quarter: 17–25, 13–12, 18–24, 16–16
Pts: Kuzminskas 20; Rebs: Valančiūnas 15; Asts: Kalnietis 7		Pts: Sloukas 21; Rebs: Bourousis 8 Asts: Calathes 6

Sinan Erdem Dome, Istanbul
Attendance: 2,144
Referees: Vicente Bulto (ESP), Marek Cmikiewicz (POL), Petar Obradović (BIH)

=== Latvia v Montenegro ===
10 September 2017
12:30

Boxscore

Latvia	100–68	Montenegro
Scoring by quarter: 27–15, 26–22, 29–15, 18–16
Pts: Timma 21; Rebs: Porziņģis 6 Asts: Strēlnieks 7		Pts: Dubljević 21; Rebs: Vučević 9 Asts: Vučević 4

Sinan Erdem Dome, Istanbul
Attendance: 718
Referees: Vicente Bulto (ESP), Martin Horozov (BUL), Manuel Mazzoni (ITA)

=== Serbia v Hungary ===
10 September 2017
15:15

Boxscore

Serbia	86–78	Hungary
Scoring by quarter: 24–16, 24–25, 21–12, 17–25
Pts: Bogdanović, Kuzmić 17; Rebs: Kuzmić 10; Asts: Jović 7		Pts: Perl 22; Rebs: Perl 7 Asts: Hanga, Perl 4

Sinan Erdem Dome, Istanbul
Attendance: 1,190
Referees: Leandro Lezcano (ARG), Georgios Poursanidis (GRE), Yener Yılmaz (TUR)

=== Spain v Turkey ===
10 September 2017
18:45

Boxscore

Spain	73–56	Turkey
Scoring by quarter: 19–10, 14–15, 16–18, 24–13
Pts: Rubio 15; Rebs: P. Gasol 7 Asts: Rodríguez 9		Pts: Korkmaz 20; Rebs: Erden 10; Asts: Güler 4

Sinan Erdem Dome, Istanbul
Attendance: 9,934
Referees: Cristiano Maranho (BRA), Tomas Jasevičius (LTU), Takaki Kato (JPN)

=== Croatia v Russia ===
10 September 2017
21:30

Boxscore

Croatia	78–101	Russia
Scoring by quarter: 23–25, 19–21, 15–26, 21–29
Pts: Bogdanović 28; Rebs: Ramljak 6 Asts: Ukić 5		Pts: Shved 27; Rebs: Kurbanov 5 Asts: Shved 12

Sinan Erdem Dome, Istanbul
Attendance: 10,153
Referees: Roberto Vázquez (PUR), Saverio Lanzarini (ITA), Yohan Rosso (FRA)

== Quarterfinals ==
=== Germany v Spain ===
12 September 2017
18:45

Boxscore

Germany	72–84	Spain
Scoring by quarter: 19–16, 14–18, 20–31, 19–19
Pts: Schröder 27; Rebs: Voigtmann 7 Asts: Schröder 8		Pts: M. Gasol 28; Rebs: M. Gasol 10; Asts: Rubio 8

Sinan Erdem Dome, Istanbul
Attendance: 1,845
Referees: Manuel Mazzoni (ITA), Panagiotis Anastopoulos (GRE), Aleksandar Glišić (SRB)

=== Slovenia v Latvia ===
12 September 2017
21:30

Boxscore

Slovenia	103–97	Latvia
Scoring by quarter: 34–23, 17–32, 25–11, 27–31
Pts: Dončić 27; Rebs: Randolph 9 Asts: Dragić 8		Pts: Porziņģis 34; Rebs: Strēlnieks 7 Asts: Strēlnieks 9

Sinan Erdem Dome, Istanbul
Attendance: 2,651
Referees: Luis Roberto Vázquez (PUR), Saverio Lanzarini (ITA), Leandro Lezcano (ARG)

=== Greece v Russia ===
13 September 2017
18:45

Boxscore

Greece	69–74	Russia
Scoring by quarter: 24–17, 13–14, 16–20, 16–23
Pts: Calathes 25; Rebs: Bourousis, Papanikolaou 7 Asts: Calathes 7		Pts: Shved 26; Rebs: Vorontsevich 12; Asts: Shved 5

Sinan Erdem Dome, Istanbul
Attendance: 2,070
Referees: Cristiano Maranho (BRA), Antonio Conde (ESP), Yohan Rosso (FRA)

=== Italy v Serbia ===
13 September 2017
21:30

Boxscore

Italy	67–83	Serbia
Scoring by quarter: 17–18, 16–26, 15–15, 19–24
Pts: Belinelli 18; Rebs: Biligha, Filloy 3 Asts: Melli 3		Pts: Bogdanović 22; Rebs: Kuzmić, Marjanović 7 Asts: Jović 5

Sinan Erdem Dome, Istanbul
Attendance: 3,046
Referees: Vicente Bulto (ESP), Takaki Kato (JPN), Tomas Jasevičius (LTU)

== Semifinals ==
=== Spain v Slovenia ===
14 September 2017
21:30

Boxscore

Spain	72–92	Slovenia
Scoring by quarter: 19–25, 26–24, 12–24, 15–19
Pts: P. Gasol 16; Rebs: M. Gasol 10; Asts: M. Gasol 4		Pts: Dragić, Randolph 15; Rebs: Dončić 12; Asts: Dončić 8

Sinan Erdem Dome, Istanbul
Attendance: 4,955
Referees: Cristiano Maranho (BRA), Tolga Sahin (ITA), Yohan Rosso (FRA)

=== Russia v Serbia ===
15 September 2017
21:30

Boxscore

Russia	79–87	Serbia
Scoring by quarter: 20–25, 14–23, 23–18, 22–21
Pts: Shved 33; Rebs: Mozgov 9 Asts: Shved 5		Pts: Bogdanović 24; Rebs: Lučić 8 Asts: Jović 6

Sinan Erdem Dome, Istanbul
Attendance: 5,235
Referees: Leandro Lezcano (ARG), Panagiotis Anastopoulos (GRE), Manuel Mazzoni (ITA)

== Third place game ==
17 September 2017
17:00

Boxscore

Spain	93–85	Russia
Scoring by quarter: 21–13, 24–15, 21–27, 27–30
Pts: P. Gasol 26; Rebs: P. Gasol 10; Asts: Rodríguez 9		Pts: Shved 18; Rebs: Mozgov 10; Asts: Khvostov 9

Sinan Erdem Dome, Istanbul
Attendance: 3,573
Referees: Leandro Lezcano (ARG), Manuel Mazzoni (ITA), Tomas Jasevičius (LTU)

== Final ==
17 September 2017	Slovenia	93–85	Serbia	Sinan Erdem Dome, Istanbul
21:30 UTC+3 (GMT+3)	Scoring by quarter: 20–22, 36–25, 15–20, 22–18
	Pts: Dragić 35; Rebs: Dragić, Dončić 7 Asts: Dragić, Prepelič 3	Boxscore	Pts: Bogdanović 22; Rebs: Lučić 8 Asts: Bogdanović 5	Attendance: 12,095; Referees: Cristiano Maranho (Brazil), Tolga Sahin (Italy), Antonio Conde (Spain)
