= EuroBasket 2017 Group C =

Group C of EuroBasket 2017 consisted of Croatia, Czech Republic, Hungary, Montenegro, Romania and Spain. The games were played between 1 and 7 September 2017. All games were played at the Polyvalent Hall in Cluj-Napoca, Romania.

== Standings ==
Pos	Team	Pld	W	L	PF	PA	PD	Pts	Qualification
1	Spain	5	5	0	449	303	+146	10	Knockout stage
2	Croatia	5	4	1	397	336	+61	9	Knockout stage
3	Montenegro	5	3	2	378	367	+11	8	Knockout stage
4	Hungary	5	2	3	335	370	−35	7	Knockout stage
5	Czech Republic	5	1	4	356	441	−85	6	
6	Romania (H)	5	0	5	316	414	−98	5	

Source: EuroBasket
Rules for classification: 1) Points; 2) Head-to-head results; 3) Points difference; 4) Points scored.
(H) Hosts

All times are local (UTC+3).

== Matches ==
=== Hungary v Croatia ===
1 September 2017
15:00

Boxscore

Hungary	58–67	Croatia
Scoring by quarter: 20–20, 16–19, 17–13, 5–15
Pts: Perl 12; Rebs: Keller, Vojvoda 6 Asts: Hanga 4		Pts: Bogdanović 23; Rebs: Bogdanović 7 Asts: Ukić 4

Polyvalent Hall, Cluj-Napoca
Attendance: 1,680
Referees: Panagiotis Anastopoulos (GRE), Nicolas Maestre (FRA), Markos Michaelides (SUI)

=== Spain v Montenegro ===
1 September 2017
17:45

Boxscore

Spain	99–60	Montenegro
Scoring by quarter: 26–14, 25–15, 19–15, 29–16
Pts: W. Hernangómez 18; Rebs: W. Hernangómez 9 Asts: Rodríguez 10		Pts: Vučević 16; Rebs: Vučević 5 Asts: Pavličević, Rice 3

Polyvalent Hall, Cluj-Napoca
Attendance: 2,300
Referees: Tolga Sahin (ITA), Christopher Reid (AUS), Yohan Rosso (FRA)

=== Romania v Czech Republic ===
1 September 2017
20:30

Boxscore

Romania	68–83	Czech Republic
Scoring by quarter: 22–21, 16–19, 9–22, 21–21
Pts: Moldoveanu 24; Rebs: Moldoveanu 8 Asts: Mandache 5		Pts: Hruban 25; Rebs: Satoranský 13; Asts: Satoranský 6

Polyvalent Hall, Cluj-Napoca
Attendance: 2,260
Referees: Roberto Vásquez (PUR), Boris Krejić (SLO), Sergiy Zashchuk (UKR)

=== Montenegro v Hungary ===
2 September 2017
15:00

Boxscore

Montenegro	72–48	Hungary
Scoring by quarter: 14–11, 25–18, 21–11, 12–8
Pts: Dubljević, Vučević 13; Rebs: Barović 9 Asts: Ivanović, Rice 3		Pts: Vojvoda 20; Rebs: Karahodžić 7 Asts: Hanga 3

Polyvalent Hall, Cluj-Napoca
Attendance: 2,434
Referees: Roberto Vásquez (PUR), Markos Michaelides (SUI), Sergiy Zashchuk (UKR)

=== Czech Republic v Spain ===
2 September 2017
17:45

Boxscore

Czech Republic	56–93	Spain
Scoring by quarter: 14–33, 9–23, 15–20, 18–17
Pts: Kriz 11; Rebs: Satoranský, Švrdlík 5 Asts: Satoranský 5		Pts: P. Gasol 26; Rebs: W. Hernangómez 10; Asts: Navarro, Rubio 5

Polyvalent Hall, Cluj-Napoca
Attendance: 3,033
Referees: Panagiotis Anastopoulos (GRE), Erez Gurion (ISR), Christopher Reid (AUS)

=== Croatia v Romania ===
2 September 2017
20:30

Boxscore

Croatia	74–58	Romania
Scoring by quarter: 20–12, 22–17, 15–13, 17–16
Pts: Bogdanović 21; Rebs: Šarić 10; Asts: Ramljak, Simon 4		Pts: Moldoveanu 14; Rebs: Mandache 7 Asts: Mandache 6

Polyvalent Hall, Cluj-Napoca
Attendance: 4,754
Referees: Tolga Sahin (ITA), Nicolas Maestre (FRA), Yohan Rosso (FRA)

=== Hungary v Czech Republic ===
4 September 2017
15:00

Boxscore

Hungary	85–73	Czech Republic
Scoring by quarter: 23–16, 21–17, 22–25, 19–15
Pts: Hanga 31; Rebs: Hanga 8 Asts: Hanga 8		Pts: Palyza, Satoranský 18; Rebs: Satoranský 7 Asts: Satoranský, Welsch 4

Polyvalent Hall, Cluj-Napoca
Attendance: 1,893
Referees: Tolga Sahin (ITA), Nicolas Maestre (FRA), Christopher Reid (AUS)

=== Montenegro v Croatia ===
4 September 2017
17:45

Boxscore

Montenegro	72–76	Croatia
Scoring by quarter: 17–25, 14–18, 21–19, 20–14
Pts: Rice 22; Rebs: Dubljević 11; Asts: Ivanović 3		Pts: Bogdanović 23; Rebs: three players 6 Asts: Ukić 5

Polyvalent Hall, Cluj-Napoca
Attendance: 1,983
Referees: Panagiotis Anastopoulos (GRE), Yohan Rosso (FRA), Roberto Vásquez (PUR)

=== Spain v Romania ===
4 September 2017
20:30

Boxscore

Spain	91–50	Romania
Scoring by quarter: 21–19, 20–8, 29–8, 21–15
Pts: J. Hernangómez 18; Rebs: W. Hernangómez 13; Asts: Rodríguez 7		Pts: Moldoveanu 15; Rebs: Cățe, Moldoveanu 6 Asts: Moldoveanu 3

Polyvalent Hall, Cluj-Napoca
Attendance: 8,163
Referees: Markos Michaelides (SUI), Erez Gurion (ISR), Boris Krejić (SLO)

=== Czech Republic v Montenegro ===
5 September 2017
15:00

Boxscore

Czech Republic	75–88	Montenegro
Scoring by quarter: 17–24, 17–25, 21–29, 20–10
Pts: Auda 14; Rebs: Švrdlík, Peterka 4 Asts: Satoranský 11		Pts: Ivanović, Vučević 17; Rebs: Vučević 14; Asts: Pavličević 5

Polyvalent Hall, Cluj-Napoca
Attendance: 2,424
Referees: Yohan Rosso (FRA), Sergiy Zashchuk (UKR), Erez Gurion (ISR)

=== Croatia v Spain ===
5 September 2017
17:45

Boxscore

Croatia	73–79	Spain
Scoring by quarter: 20–21, 12–17, 22–15, 19–26
Pts: Šarić 18; Rebs: Šarić 13; Asts: Simon 6		Pts: Rubio 13; Rebs: P. Gasol 10; Asts: Rubio 4

Polyvalent Hall, Cluj-Napoca
Attendance: 6,089
Referees: Tolga Sahin (ITA), Panagiotis Anastopoulos (GRE), Nicolas Maestre (FRA)

=== Romania v Hungary ===
5 September 2017
20:30

Boxscore

Romania	71–80	Hungary
Scoring by quarter: 15–16, 17–22, 20–22, 19–20
Pts: Mandache 24; Rebs: Moldoveanu 9 Asts: Calota, Kuti 4		Pts: Vojvoda 26; Rebs: Keller 7 Asts: Vojvoda 4

Polyvalent Hall, Cluj-Napoca
Attendance: 9,121
Referees: Roberto Vásquez (PUR), Boris Krejić (SLO), Christopher Reid (AUS)

=== Czech Republic v Croatia ===
7 September 2017
14:30

Boxscore

Czech Republic	69–107	Croatia
Scoring by quarter: 17–28, 23–26, 20–24, 9–29
Pts: Auda 19; Rebs: Auda 5 Asts: Satoranský 6		Pts: Bogdanović 25; Rebs: Šarić 10; Asts: Simon, Ukić 6

Polyvalent Hall, Cluj-Napoca
Attendance: 737
Referees: Tolga Sahin (ITA), Yohan Rosso (FRA), Christopher Reid (AUS)

=== Hungary v Spain ===
7 September 2017
17:15

Boxscore

Hungary	64–87	Spain
Scoring by quarter: 10–22, 19–19, 17–19, 18–27
Pts: Ferencz 17; Rebs: three players 4 Asts: Vojvoda 4		Pts: P. Gasol 20; Rebs: P. Gasol 8 Asts: Rodríguez 7

Polyvalent Hall, Cluj-Napoca
Attendance: 3,180
Referees: Nicolas Maestre (FRA), Sergiy Zashchuk (UKR), Boris Krejić (SLO)

=== Montenegro v Romania ===
7 September 2017
20:45

Boxscore

Montenegro	86–69	Romania
Scoring by quarter: 24–19, 18–11, 24–23, 20–16
Pts: Đurišić 14; Rebs: Dubljević 9 Asts: Pavličević 6		Pts: Kuti 18; Rebs: Mandache 10; Asts: Mandache 11

Polyvalent Hall, Cluj-Napoca
Attendance: 3,419
Referees: Panagiotis Anastopoulos (GRE), Markos Michaelides (SUI), Erez Gurion (ISR)
