= EuroBasket 2017 =

International basketball event

Koripallon Euroopan-mestaruuskilpailut 2017 (in Finnish) Europamästerskapet i basket för herrar 2017 (in Swedish) אליפות אירופה בכדורסל 2017 (in Hebrew) Campionatul European de Baschet Masculin din 2017 (in Romanian) 2017 Avrupa Basketbol Şampiyonası (in Turkish)

Tournament details
- Host countries: Finland; Israel; Romania; Turkey
- Dates: 1 August – 17 September 2017
- Teams: 24
- Venues: 5 (in 4 host cities)

Final positions
- Champions: Slovenia (1st title)
- Runners-up: Serbia
- Third place: Spain
- Fourth place: Russia

Tournament statistics
- Games played: 76
- Attendance: 315,737 (4,154 per game)
- MVP: (Slovenia) Goran Dragić
- Top scorer: (Russia) Alexey Shved (24.3 ppg)
- Top rebounds: (Lithuania) Jonas Valančiūnas (12.0 rpg)
- Top assists: (Lithuania) Mantas Kalnietis (7.2 apg)
- PPG (Team): Latvia (91.6 ppg)
- RPG (Team): Spain (42.0 rpg)
- APG (Team): Latvia (24.3 apg)

Official website
- www.fiba.basketball

EuroBasket 2017 was the 40th edition of the EuroBasket championship that was organized by FIBA Europe and held between 31 August and 17 September 2017. Beginning from 2017, the continental championships take place every four years with a similar system of qualification as for the FIBA Basketball World Cup.

Like the previous edition, the tournament was co-hosted by four countries. Games in the group stage were held in Turkey, Finland, Israel and Romania. The knock-out phase was played in Istanbul, Turkey.

Slovenia won their first-ever tournament after defeating Serbia 93–85 in the final. Spain won the bronze medal by beating Russia with the same result.

== Host selection ==
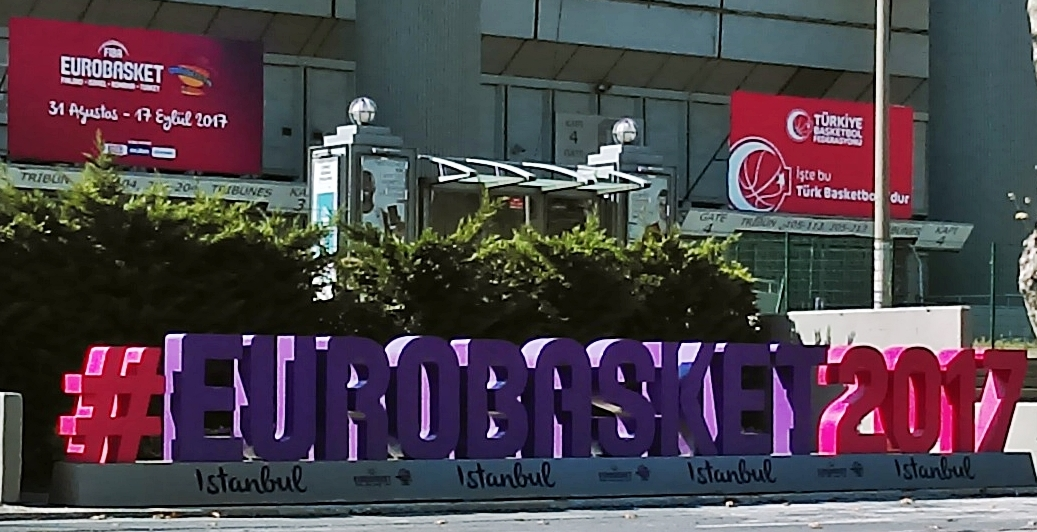
A EuroBasket 2017 hashtag sign outside Istanbul's Abdi İpekçi Arena

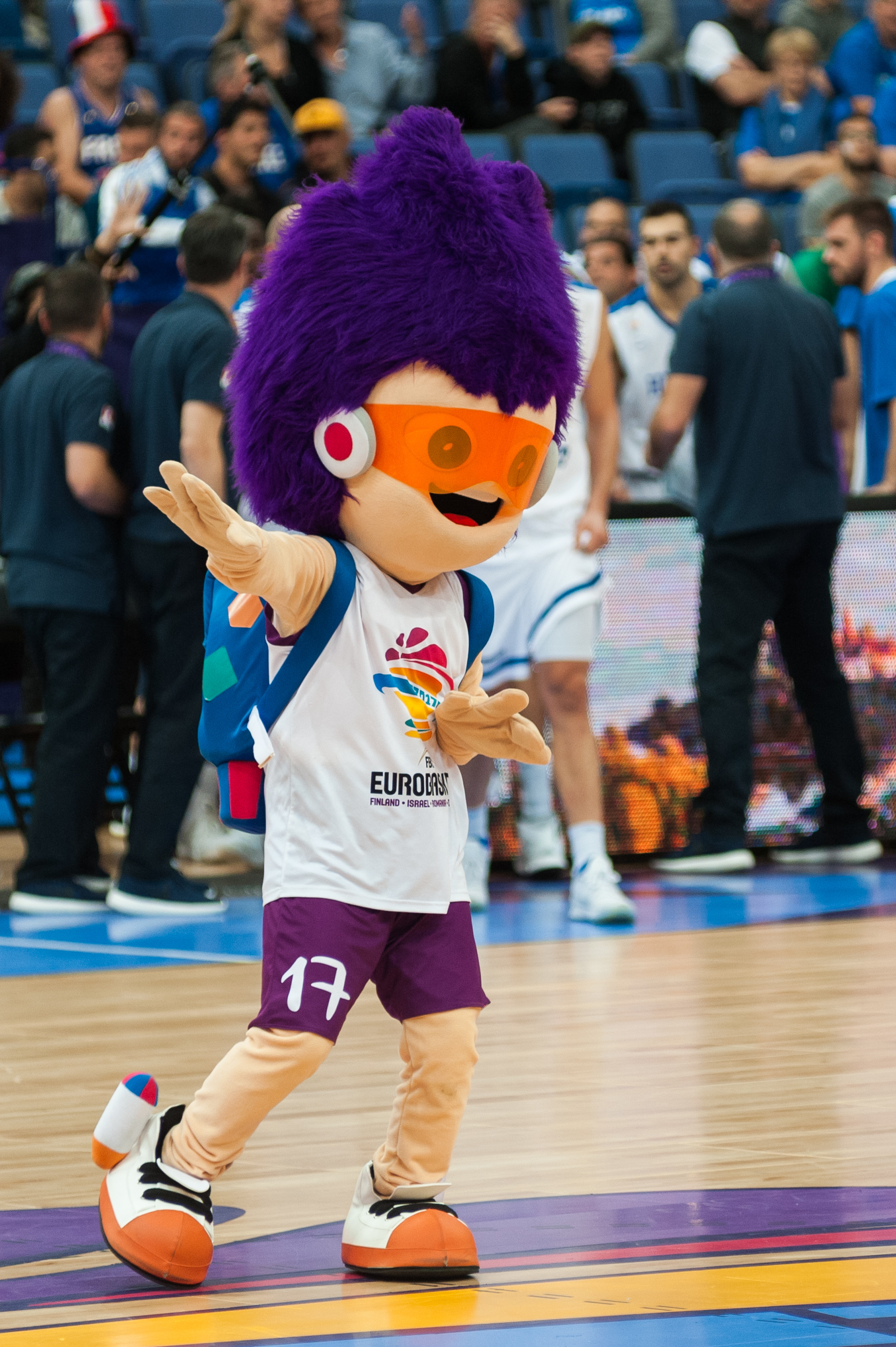
Sam Dunk was the official mascot

Following the decision to relocate the 2015 tournament, original hosts Ukraine were offered the chance to host the 2017 edition, but they declined, citing the ongoing unrest in the country. Countries expressed interest in hosting were Lithuania, Latvia, Estonia and Finland (possible joint bid), Serbia, Macedonia, and Bulgaria (possible joint bid), United Kingdom, Israel, Poland, Slovenia, Belgium.

On 5 November 2015, FIBA Europe announced that five national federations had applied to organise EuroBasket 2017: Finland, Israel, Poland, Romania and Turkey.

On 11 December 2015, FIBA Europe announced that the tournament would be hosted by four countries: Israel, Romania, Finland and Turkey with the knockout stage hosted at the Sinan Erdem Dome in Istanbul.

== Venues ==
Istanbul	EuroBasket 2017 (Europe)	
Sinan Erdem Dome	EuroBasket 2017 (Europe)	
Capacity: 16,000	EuroBasket 2017 (Europe)	
Istanbul	EuroBasket 2017 (Europe)	
Ülker Sports Arena	EuroBasket 2017 (Europe)	
Capacity: 13,000	EuroBasket 2017 (Europe)	
Helsinki	Tel Aviv	Cluj-Napoca
Hartwall Arena	Menora Mivtachim Arena	BTarena
Capacity: 14,000	Capacity: 10,383	Capacity: 10,000

== Format ==
A total of 24 qualified teams played in groups of six; the four best teams in these groups advanced to a single-elimination knockout stage.

== Qualification ==
The hosts (4 teams) and 2016 Summer Olympics or 2016 Olympic Qualifying Tournament participants (9 other teams) all qualified directly to the EuroBasket 2017.

The remaining 27 teams joined through qualification from 31 August 2016 to 17 September 2016 for 11 places.

Team	Qualification method	Date of qualification	App	Last	Best placement in tournament
Finland	Host nation	11 December 2015	16th	2015	6th Place (1967)
Israel	Host nation	11 December 2015	29th	2015	Runners-up (1979)
Romania	Host nation	11 December 2015	18th	1987	5th Place (1957)
Turkey	Host nation	11 December 2015	24th	2015	Runners-up (2001)
Spain	1st in EuroBasket 2015	20 September 2015	31st	2015	Champions (2009, 2011, 2015)
Lithuania	2nd in EuroBasket 2015	20 September 2015	14th	2015	Champions (1937, 1939, 2003)
France	3rd in EuroBasket 2015	20 September 2015	38th	2015	Champions (2013)
Serbia	4th in EuroBasket 2015	20 September 2015	6th	2015	Runners-up (2009)
Greece	5th in EuroBasket 2015	20 September 2015	27th	2015	Champions (1987, 2005)
Italy	6th in EuroBasket 2015	20 September 2015	37th	2015	Champions (1983, 1999)
Czech Republic	7th in EuroBasket 2015	20 September 2015	5th	2015	7th Place (2015)
Latvia	8th in EuroBasket 2015	20 September 2015	14th	2015	Champions (1935)
Croatia	9th in EuroBasket 2015	20 September 2015	13th	2015	3rd Place (1993, 1995)
Belgium	1st in Qualification Group A	14 September 2016	17th	2015	4th Place (1947)
Germany	1st in Qualification Group B	17 September 2016	24th	2015	Champions (1993)
Russia	1st in Qualification Group C	10 September 2016	13th	2015	Champions (2007)
Poland	1st in Qualification Group D	17 September 2016	28th	2015	Runners-up (1963)
Slovenia	1st in Qualification Group E	14 September 2016	13th	2015	4th Place (2009)
Georgia	1st in Qualification Group F	17 September 2016	4th	2015	11th Place (2011)
Hungary	1st in Qualification Group G	14 September 2016	15th	1999	Champions (1955)
Iceland	2nd in Qualification Group A (top 4 ranked of 2nd-placed teams)	17 September 2016	2nd	2015	24th Place (2015)
Ukraine	2nd in Qualification Group E (top 4 ranked of 2nd-placed teams)	17 September 2016	8th	2015	6th Place (2013)
Montenegro	2nd in Qualification Group F (top 4 ranked of 2nd-placed teams)	14 September 2016	3rd	2013	17th Place (2013)
Great Britain	2nd in Qualification Group G (top 4 ranked of 2nd-placed teams)	17 September 2016	4th	2013	13th Place (2009, 2011, 2013)

== Draw ==
The draw took place in Turkey on 22 November 2016.

=== Seedings ===
FIBA Europe released the seedings for the EuroBasket 2017 draw on 20 November 2016. According to the FIBA Europe regulations the participating nations, the 9 participants of the 2016 Summer Olympics and Olympic Qualifying Tournaments would be seeded first, based on their respective records in EuroBasket 2015, with the remaining teams seeded based on their qualification records.

As in the EuroBasket 2015, each of the four hosts was granted the right to select a partner federation for commercial and marketing criteria. These teams would automatically be placed into the same group as their chosen partner country.

Host team	Chosen team	Date
Finland	Iceland	7 October 2016
Israel	Lithuania	27 October 2016
Romania	Hungary	3 November 2016
Turkey	Russia	15 November 2016

Team	Qualification	Position	Record (against top 3 in group)
Spain	2016 Olympics participant	1 (EuroBasket 2015)	
Lithuania	2016 Olympics participant	2 (EuroBasket 2015)	
France	2016 Olympics participant	3 (EuroBasket 2015)	
Serbia	2016 Olympics participant	4 (EuroBasket 2015)	
Greece	Olympic Qualifying Tournament participant	5 (EuroBasket 2015)	
Italy	Olympic Qualifying Tournament participant	6 (EuroBasket 2015)	
Czech Republic	Olympic Qualifying Tournament participant	7 (EuroBasket 2015)	
Latvia	Olympic Qualifying Tournament participant	8 (EuroBasket 2015)	
Croatia	2016 Olympics participant	9 (EuroBasket 2015)	
Israel	Host country	10 (EuroBasket 2015)	
Turkey	Host country	14 (EuroBasket 2015)	
Finland	Host country	16 (EuroBasket 2015)	
Russia	1st in 2017 qualification group C	Q1	4–0, 1.2213
Slovenia	1st in 2017 qualification group E	Q2	4–0, 1.1568
Hungary	1st in 2017 qualification group G	Q3	4–0, 1.1373
Georgia	1st in 2017 qualification group F	Q4	3–1, 1.2165
Germany	1st in 2017 qualification group B	Q5	3–1, 1.2016
Belgium	1st in 2017 qualification group A	Q6	3–1, 1.1875
Poland	1st in 2017 qualification group D	Q7	3–1, 1.1560
Montenegro	Best runner-up in EuroBasket 2017 qualification	Q8	3–1, 1.2234
Iceland	2nd best runner-up in EuroBasket 2017 qualification	Q9	3–1, 1.0876
Great Britain	3rd best runner-up in EuroBasket 2017 qualification	Q10	2–2, 1.0523
Ukraine	4th best runner-up in EuroBasket 2017 qualification	Q11	2–2, 0.9900
Romania	Host country	Did not qualify for EuroBasket 2015	

=== Final draw ===
Seed 1	Seed 2	Seed 3	Seed 4	Seed 5	Seed 6
Spain; Lithuania ^{b} France; Serbia	Greece; Italy; Czech Republic; Latvia	Croatia ^{e} Israel ^{b} Turkey ^{d} Finland ^{a}	Russia ^{d} Slovenia; Hungary ^{c} Georgia	Germany; Belgium; Poland; Montenegro	Iceland ^{a} Great Britain; Ukraine; Romania ^{c}

^a Finland was paired with Iceland before the draw.
^b Israel was paired with Lithuania before the draw.
^c Romania was paired with Hungary before the draw.
^d Turkey was paired with Russia before the draw.
^e Before the draw it was already certain that Croatia would end up in the group with Hungary and Romania, due to the assignments of Finland, Israel and Turkey in their pot.

== Preliminary round ==
Similar to EuroBasket 2015 the preliminary round was played in four venues in different countries. Each of the four groups consisted of six teams, the best four teams of each group advanced to the knockout stage. The first matches were played on 31 August and the last were scheduled for 7 September.

=== Group A ===
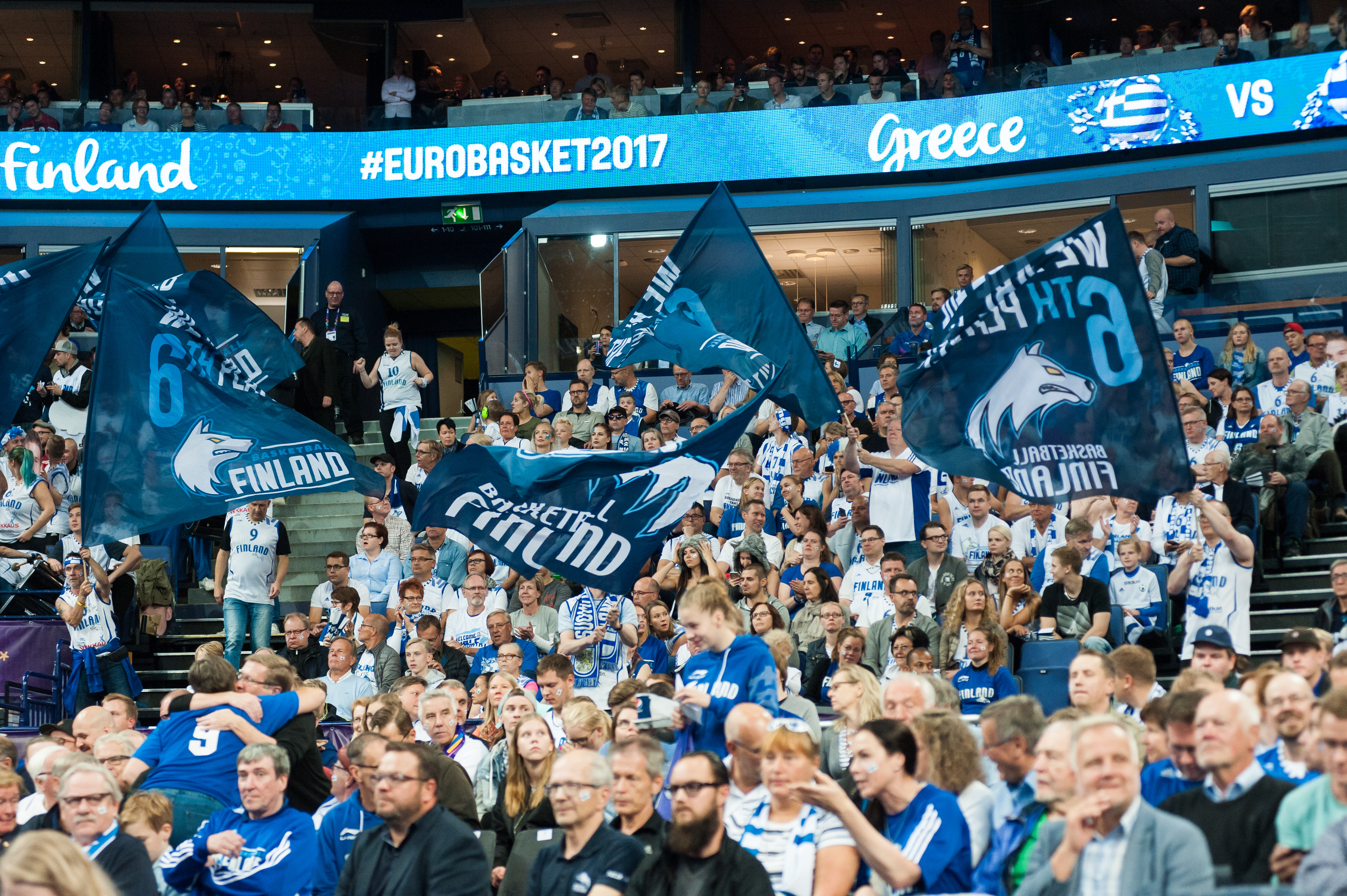
The home crowd cheering on the Finnish national team in Helsinki, Finland

Venue: Helsinki, Finland

Pos	Team	Pld	W	L	PF	PA	PD	Pts	Qualification
1	Slovenia	5	5	0	446	384	+62	10	Knockout stage
2	Finland (H)	5	4	1	426	408	+18	9	Knockout stage
3	France	5	3	2	450	422	+28	8	Knockout stage
4	Greece	5	2	3	421	400	+21	7	Knockout stage
5	Poland	5	1	4	411	414	−3	6	
6	Iceland	5	0	5	355	481	−126	5	

Source: EuroBasket
Rules for classification: 1) Points. 2) Head-to-head results. 3) Points difference. 4) Points scored.
(H) Hosts

31 August 2017
Slovenia	90–81	Poland
Iceland	61–90	Greece
France	84–86 OT	Finland
2 September 2017
Poland	91–61	Iceland
Greece	87–95	France
Finland	78–81	Slovenia
3 September 2017
France	115–79	Iceland
Slovenia	78–72	Greece
Finland	90–87 2OT	Poland
5 September 2017
Iceland	75–102	Slovenia
Poland	75–78	France
Greece	77–89	Finland
6 September 2017
Slovenia	95–78	France
Greece	95–77	Poland
Finland	83–79	Iceland

=== Group B ===
Venue: Tel Aviv, Israel

Pos	Team	Pld	W	L	PF	PA	PD	Pts	Qualification
1	Lithuania	5	4	1	426	359	+67	9	Knockout stage
2	Germany	5	3	2	355	346	+9	8 (Note: Germany 61–55 Italy)	Knockout stage
3	Italy	5	3	2	346	322	+24	8	Knockout stage
4	Ukraine	5	2	3	367	392	−25	7 (Note: Ukraine 88–81 Georgia)	Knockout stage
5	Georgia	5	2	3	390	394	−4	7	
6	Israel (H)	5	1	4	358	429	−71	6	

Source: EuroBasket
Rules for classification: 1) Points; 2) Head-to-head results; 3) Points difference; 4) Points scored.
(H) Hosts
Notes:

31 August 2017
Germany	75–63	Ukraine
Lithuania	77–79	Georgia
Italy	69–48	Israel
2 September 2017
Georgia	57–67	Germany
Ukraine	66–78	Italy
Israel	73–88	Lithuania
3 September 2017
Georgia	81–88	Ukraine
Lithuania	78–73	Italy
Germany	80–82	Israel
5 September 2017
Ukraine	62–94	Lithuania
Italy	55–61	Germany
Israel	91–104 OT	Georgia
6 September 2017
Germany	72–89	Lithuania
Georgia	69–71	Italy
Israel	64–88	Ukraine

=== Group C ===
Venue: Cluj-Napoca, Romania

Pos	Team	Pld	W	L	PF	PA	PD	Pts	Qualification
1	Spain	5	5	0	449	303	+146	10	Knockout stage
2	Croatia	5	4	1	397	336	+61	9	Knockout stage
3	Montenegro	5	3	2	378	367	+11	8	Knockout stage
4	Hungary	5	2	3	335	370	−35	7	Knockout stage
5	Czech Republic	5	1	4	356	441	−85	6	
6	Romania (H)	5	0	5	316	414	−98	5	

Source: EuroBasket
Rules for classification: 1) Points; 2) Head-to-head results; 3) Points difference; 4) Points scored.
(H) Hosts

1 September 2017
Hungary	58–67	Croatia
Spain	99–60	Montenegro
Romania	68–83	Czech Republic
2 September 2017
Montenegro	72–48	Hungary
Czech Republic	56–93	Spain
Croatia	74–58	Romania
4 September 2017
Hungary	85–73	Czech Republic
Montenegro	72–76	Croatia
Spain	91–50	Romania
5 September 2017
Czech Republic	75–88	Montenegro
Croatia	73–79	Spain
Romania	71–80	Hungary
7 September 2017
Czech Republic	69–107	Croatia
Hungary	64–87	Spain
Montenegro	86–69	Romania

=== Group D ===
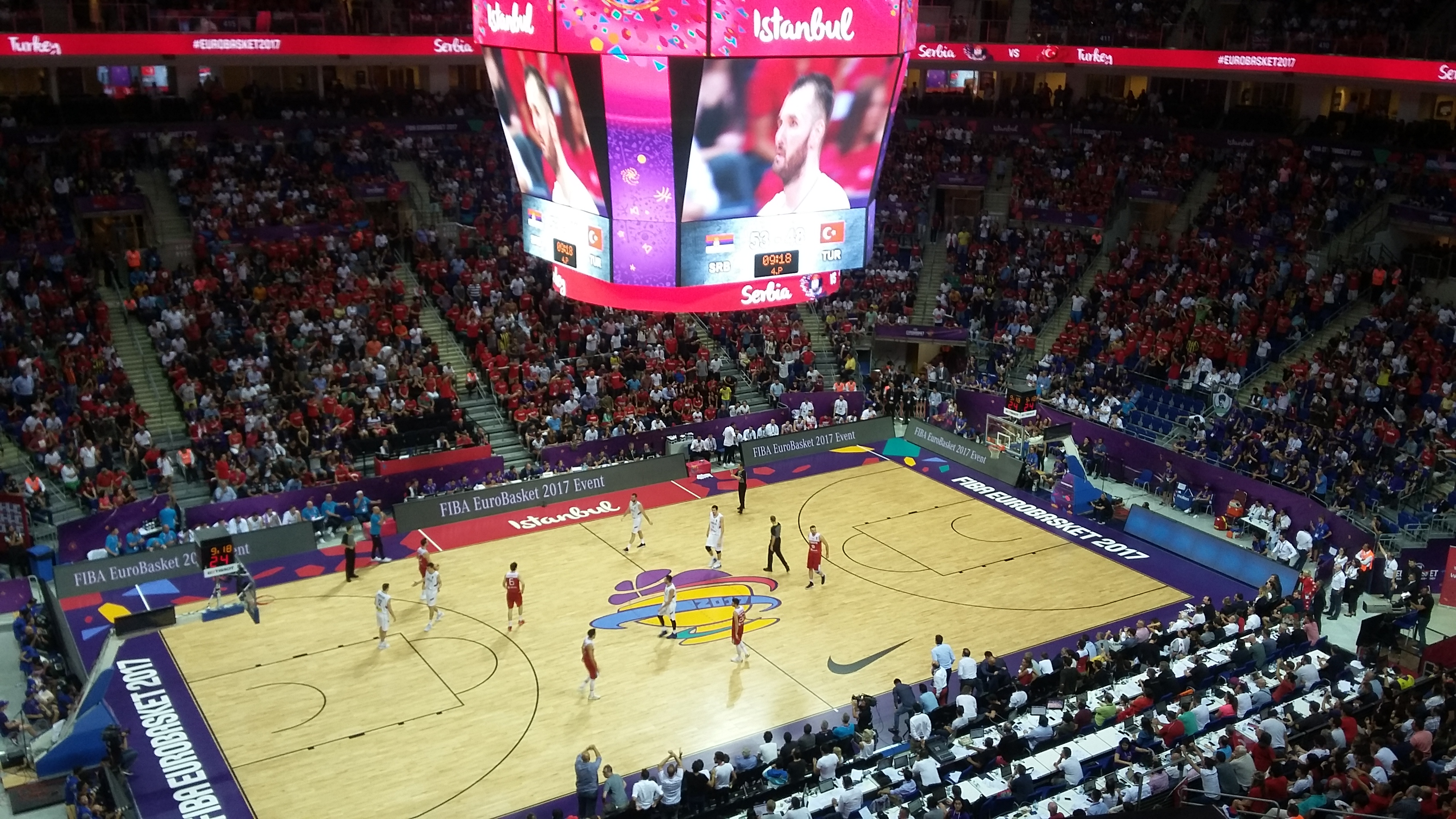
Serbia against Turkey

Venue: Istanbul, Turkey

Pos	Team	Pld	W	L	PF	PA	PD	Pts	Qualification
1	Serbia	5	4	1	400	353	+47	9 (Note: Serbia 3 Pts, +7 PD; Latvia 3 Pts, +5 PD; Russia 3 Pts, −12 PD)	Knockout stage
2	Latvia	5	4	1	444	396	+48	9	Knockout stage
3	Russia	5	4	1	378	366	+12	9	Knockout stage
4	Turkey (H)	5	2	3	388	380	+8	7	Knockout stage
5	Belgium	5	1	4	353	410	−57	6	
6	Great Britain	5	0	5	390	448	−58	5	

Source: EuroBasket
Rules for classification: 1) Points; 2) Head-to-head results; 3) Points difference; 4) Points scored.
(H) Hosts
Notes:

1 September 2017
Belgium	103–90	Great Britain
Serbia	92–82	Latvia
Turkey	73–76	Russia
2 September 2017
Latvia	92–64	Belgium
Russia	75–72	Serbia
Great Britain	70–84	Turkey
4 September 2017
Latvia	97–92	Great Britain
Belgium	67–76	Russia
Serbia	80–74	Turkey
5 September 2017
Russia	69–84	Latvia
Great Britain	68–82	Serbia
Turkey	78–65	Belgium
7 September 2017
Russia	82–70	Great Britain
Belgium	54–74	Serbia
Latvia	89–79	Turkey

== Knockout stage ==
Venue: Istanbul, Turkey

Round of 16
9 September
Germany	84
France	81
10 September
Spain	73
Turkey	56
9 September
Slovenia	79
Ukraine	55
10 September
Latvia	100
Montenegro	68
9 September
Lithuania	64
Greece	77
10 September
Croatia	78
Russia	101
9 September
Finland	57
Italy	70
10 September
Serbia	86
Hungary	78

Quarterfinals
12 September
Germany	72
Spain	84
12 September
Slovenia	103
Latvia	97
13 September
Greece	69
Russia	74
13 September
Italy	67
Serbia	83

Semifinals
14 September
Spain	72
Slovenia	92
15 September
Russia	79
Serbia	87

Final
17 September
Slovenia	93
Serbia	85
Third place
17 September
Spain	93
Russia	85

=== Final ===
17 September 2017	Slovenia	93–85	Serbia	Sinan Erdem Dome, Istanbul
21:30 UTC+3 (GMT+3)	Scoring by quarter: 20–22, 36–25, 15–20, 22–18
	Pts: Dragić 35; Rebs: Dragić, Dončić 7 Asts: Dragić, Prepelič 3	Boxscore	Pts: Bogdanović 22; Rebs: Lučić 8 Asts: Bogdanović 5	Attendance: 12,095; Referees: Cristiano Maranho (Brazil), Tolga Sahin (Italy), Antonio Conde (Spain)

EuroBasket 2017 champions

Slovenia
First title

== Final standings ==
The final standings per FIBA official website:

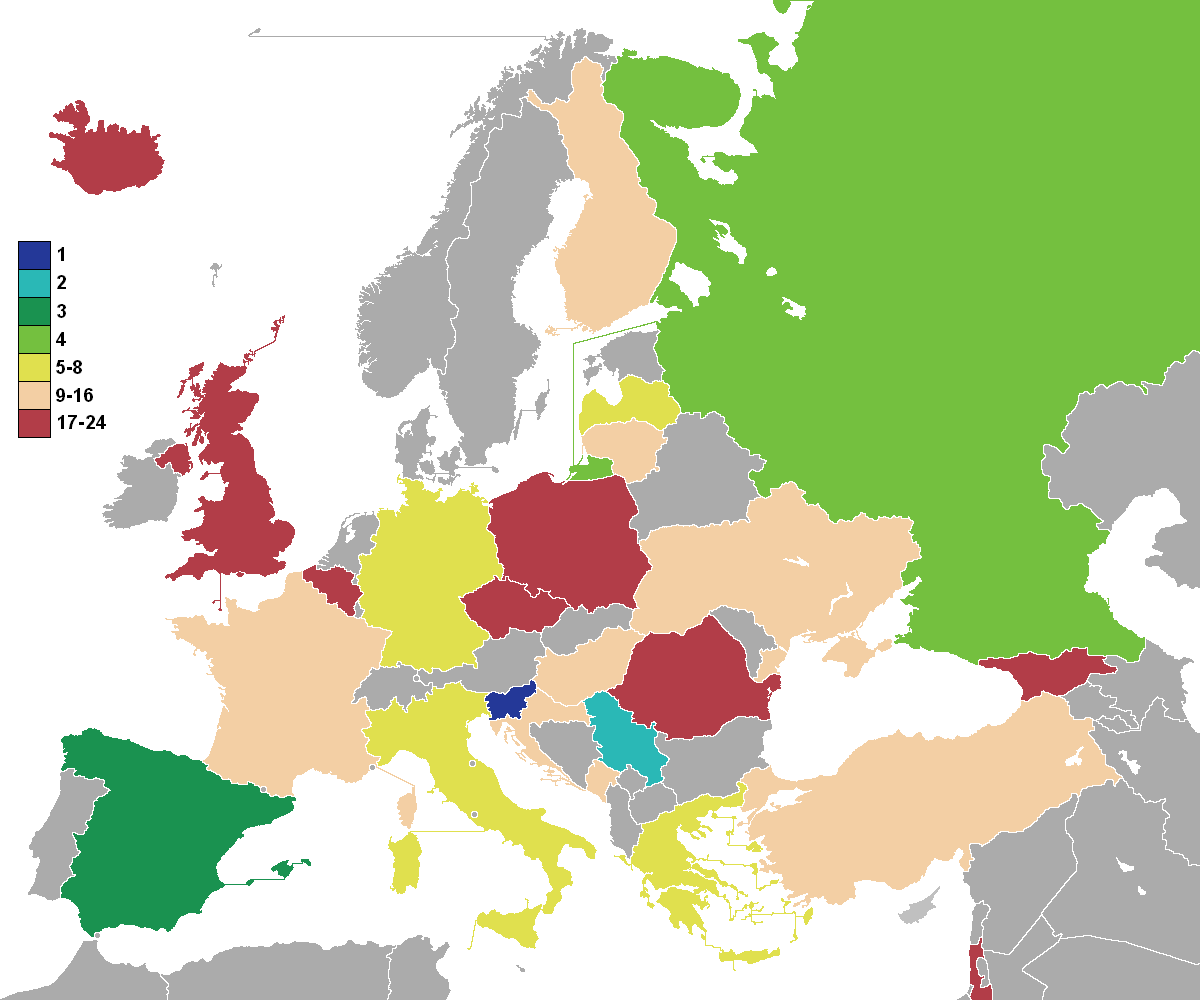
Results

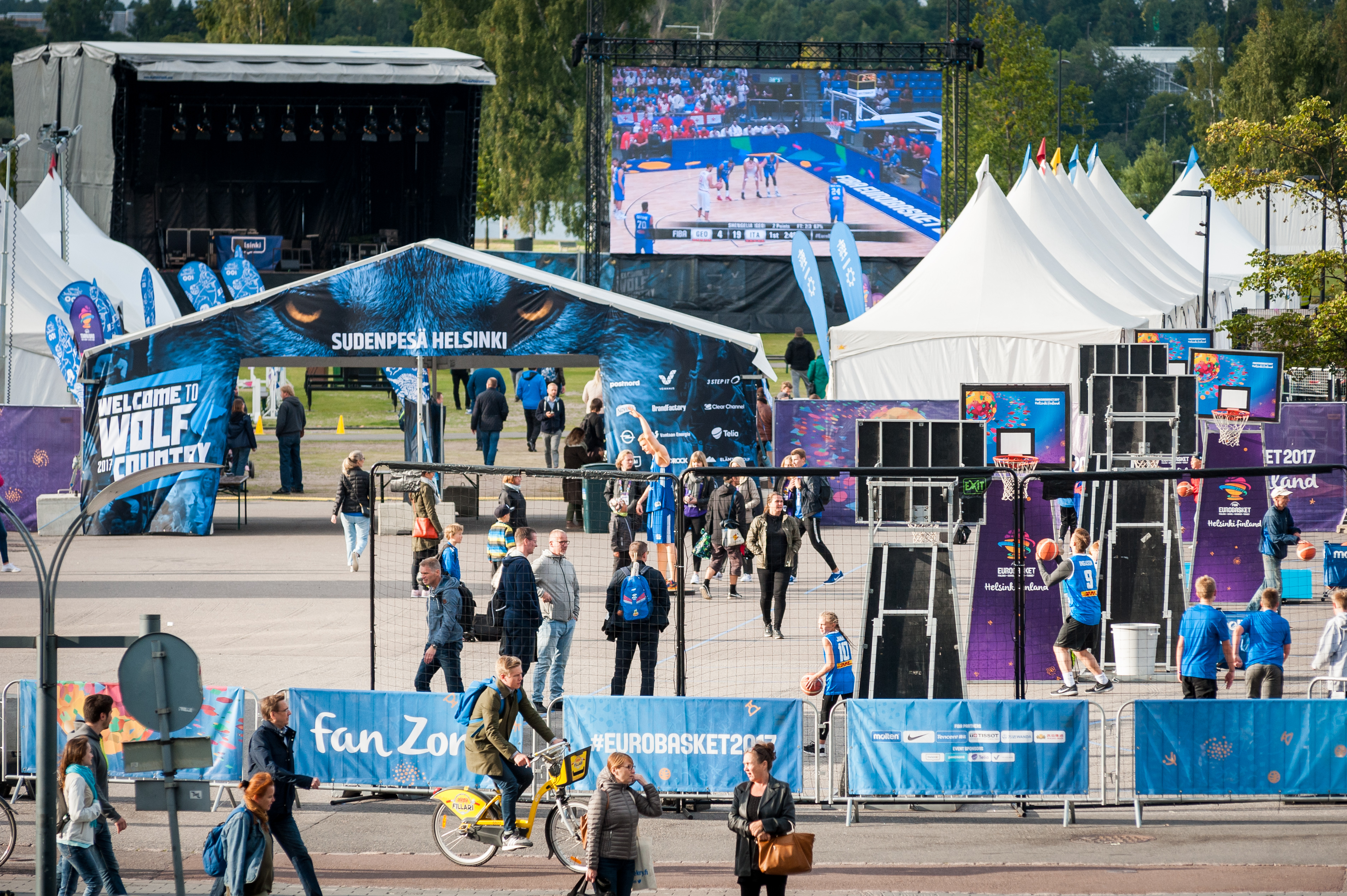
The Fan Zone, at Kansalaistori in Helsinki, Finland, during the 2017 EuroBasket

Pos	Team	Pld	W	L	PF	PA	PD	Pts
1st place, gold medalist(s)	Slovenia	9	9	0	813	693	+120	18
2nd place, silver medalist(s)	Serbia	9	7	2	741	670	+71	16
3rd place, bronze medalist(s)	Spain	9	8	1	771	608	+163	17
4	Russia	9	6	3	717	693	+24	15
5	Latvia	7	5	2	641	567	+74	12
6	Germany	7	4	3	511	511	0	11
7	Italy	7	4	3	483	462	+21	11
8	Greece	7	3	4	567	538	+29	10
9	Lithuania	6	4	2	490	436	+54	10
10	Croatia	6	4	2	475	437	+38	10
11	Finland	6	4	2	483	478	+5	10
12	France	6	3	3	531	506	+25	9
13	Montenegro	6	3	3	446	467	−21	9
14	Turkey	6	2	4	444	453	−9	8
15	Ukraine	6	2	4	422	471	−49	8
16	Hungary	6	2	4	413	456	−43	8
17	Georgia	5	2	3	390	394	−4	7
18	Poland	5	1	4	411	414	−3	6
19	Belgium	5	1	4	353	410	−57	6
20	Czech Republic	5	1	4	356	441	−85	6
21	Israel	5	1	4	358	429	−71	6
22	Great Britain	5	0	5	390	448	−58	5
23	Romania	5	0	5	316	414	−98	5
24	Iceland	5	0	5	355	481	−126	5

Source: FIBA

== Statistics and awards ==
=== Statistical leaders ===
Points

Name	PPG
(Russia) Alexey Shved	24.3
(Germany) Dennis Schröder	23.7
(Latvia) Kristaps Porziņģis	23.6
(Slovenia) Goran Dragić	22.6
(Croatia) Bojan Bogdanović	22.5

Rebounds

Name	RPG
(Lithuania) Jonas Valančiūnas	12.0
(United Kingdom) Gabriel Olaseni	11.2
(Georgia (country)) Zaza Pachulia	9.2
(Slovenia) Luka Dončić	8.1
(Montenegro) Nikola Vučević	8.0

Assists

Name	APG
(Lithuania) Mantas Kalnietis	7.2
(Spain) Sergio Rodríguez	6.8
(Czech Republic) Tomáš Satoranský	6.6
(Latvia) Jānis Strēlnieks	6.6
(Finland) Petteri Koponen	6.3

Blocks

Name	BPG
(Latvia) Kristaps Porziņģis	1.9
(Ukraine) Artem Pustovyi	1.7
(Spain) Pau Gasol	1.5
(Spain) Marc Gasol	1.4
(Slovenia) Anthony Randolph	1.4
(Slovenia) Gašper Vidmar	1.4

Steals

Name	SPG
(Romania) Andrei Mandache	2.2
(Italy) Marco Belinelli	2.1
(Ukraine) Denys Lukashov	2.0
(Turkey) Cedi Osman	2.0
(France) Nando de Colo	1.8

=== Awards ===
Most Valuable Player
(Slovenia) Goran Dragić

All Tournament Team

- (Slovenia) Goran Dragić
- (Russia) Alexey Shved
- (Serbia) Bogdan Bogdanović
- (Slovenia) Luka Dončić
- (Spain) Pau Gasol

== FIBA broadcasting rights ==
Country	Broadcaster
Albania	Radio Televizioni Shqiptar
Bosnia and Herzegovina	Sport Klub
Brazil	Esporte Interativo
China	QQLive
Croatia	HRT, Sport Klub
Finland	YLE, Viasat Finland
Georgia	1TV
Germany	Deutsche Telekom
Greece	ERT
Hungary	M4 Sport
Israel	Sport 5
Italy	Sky Italy
Kosovo	RTK, Digitalb
Lithuania	TV3 Lithuania, Viasat Sport Baltic, Viaplay
Latvia	TV3 Latvia, TV6, Viasat Sport Baltic, Viaplay
Macedonia	Sport Klub
Montenegro	RTCG, Sport Klub
Poland	TVP
Romania	TVR
Russia	Match TV
Serbia	RTS, Sport Klub
Slovenia	Kanal A, Sport Klub
Spain	Cuatro, Be Mad TV
Sweden	TV3
Turkey	NTV Spor
Ukraine	XSPORT
United States	ESPN

== Medal team rosters ==
1	2	3
Slovenia	Serbia	Spain
0 Anthony Randolph; 1 Matic Rebec; 3 Goran Dragić; 6 Aleksej Nikolić; 7 Klemen Prepelič; 8 Edo Murić; 11 Jaka Blažič; 14 Gašper Vidmar; 17 Saša Zagorac; 22 Žiga Dimec; 31 Vlatko Čančar; 77 Luka Dončić; Head coach: (Serbia) Igor Kokoškov	6 Milan Mačvan; 7 Bogdan Bogdanović; 11 Vladimir Lučić; 12 Dragan Milosavljević; 14 Stefan Birčević; 15 Vladimir Štimac; 19 Branko Lazić; 22 Vasilije Micić; 23 Marko Gudurić; 24 Stefan Jović; 32 Ognjen Kuzmić; 51 Boban Marjanović; Head coach: (Serbia) Aleksandar Đorđević	4 Pau Gasol; 6 Sergio Rodríguez; 7 Juan Carlos Navarro; 9 Ricky Rubio; 13 Marc Gasol; 14 Willy Hernangómez; 15 Joan Sastre; 16 Guillem Vives; 18 Pierre Oriola; 19 Fernando San Emeterio; 21 Álex Abrines; 41 Juan Hernangómez; Head coach: (Italy) Sergio Scariolo
