= EuroBasket 2017 Group B =

Group B of EuroBasket 2017 consisted of Georgia, Germany, Israel, Italy, Lithuania and Ukraine. The games were played between 31 August and 6 September 2017. All games were played at the Menora Mivtachim Arena in Tel Aviv, Israel.

== Standings ==
| Pos | Team | Pld | W | L | PF | PA | PD | Pts | Qualification |
|---|---|---|---|---|---|---|---|---|---|
| 1 | Lithuania | 5 | 4 | 1 | 426 | 359 | +67 | 9 | Knockout stage |
| 2 | Germany | 5 | 3 | 2 | 355 | 346 | +9 | 8 (Note: Germany 61–55 Italy) | Knockout stage |
| 3 | Italy | 5 | 3 | 2 | 346 | 322 | +24 | 8 | Knockout stage |
| 4 | Ukraine | 5 | 2 | 3 | 367 | 392 | −25 | 7 (Note: Ukraine 88–81 Georgia) | Knockout stage |
| 5 | Georgia | 5 | 2 | 3 | 390 | 394 | −4 | 7 | |
| 6 | Israel (H) | 5 | 1 | 4 | 358 | 429 | −71 | 6 | |

Source: EuroBasket
Rules for classification: 1) Points; 2) Head-to-head results; 3) Points difference; 4) Points scored.
(H) Hosts
Notes:

All times are local (UTC+3).

== Matches ==
=== Germany v Ukraine ===
31 August 2017
15:45

Boxscore

| Germany | 75–63 | Ukraine |
Scoring by quarter: 9–16, 30–17, 19–14, 17–16
| Pts: Schröder 32; Rebs: Theis 8 Asts: Schröder 7 | | Pts: Mishula 12; Rebs: Lypovyy 6 Asts: Lypovyy 7 |

Menora Mivtachim Arena, Tel Aviv
Attendance: 1,363
Referees: Ademir Zurapović (BIH), Saša Maričić (SRB), Ventsislav Velikov (BUL)

=== Lithuania v Georgia ===
31 August 2017
18:30

Boxscore

| Lithuania | 77–79 | Georgia |
Scoring by quarter: 18–18, 21–16, 18–25, 20–20
| Pts: Kuzminskas 18; Rebs: Valančiūnas 9 Asts: Kalnietis 4 | | Pts: Shengelia 29; Rebs: Pachulia 10; Asts: Dixon 7 |

Menora Mivtachim Arena, Tel Aviv
Attendance: 2,088
Referees: Leandro Lezcano (ARG), Marius Ciulin (ROU), Yener Yılmaz (TUR)

=== Italy v Israel ===
31 August 2017
21:30

Boxscore

| Italy | 69–48 | Israel |
Scoring by quarter: 21–15, 15–17, 15–9, 18–7
| Pts: Belinelli 18; Rebs: Melli 10; Asts: Hackett 5 | | Pts: Casspi 18; Rebs: Casspi 9 Asts: Ohayon 4 |

Menora Mivtachim Arena, Tel Aviv
Attendance: 9,347
Referees: Vicente Bultó (ESP), Jorge Vázquez (PUR), Gentian Cici (ALB)

=== Georgia v Germany ===
2 September 2017
15:45

Boxscore

| Georgia | 57–67 | Germany |
Scoring by quarter: 19–19, 17–22, 16–14, 5–12
| Pts: Pachulia 14; Rebs: Pachulia 8 Asts: Dixon 5 | | Pts: Schröder 23; Rebs: Barthel 7 Asts: Lô 3 |

Menora Mivtachim Arena, Tel Aviv
Attendance: 2,285
Referees: Vicente Bultó (ESP), Gentian Cici (ALB), Saša Maričić (SRB)

=== Ukraine v Italy ===
2 September 2017
18:30

Boxscore

| Ukraine | 66–78 | Italy |
Scoring by quarter: 19–16, 14–27, 15–16, 18–19
| Pts: Pustovyi 21; Rebs: Zaytsev 8 Asts: Lukashov 6 | | Pts: Belinelli 26; Rebs: Hackett 6 Asts: Hackett 7 |

Menora Mivtachim Arena, Tel Aviv
Attendance: 1,666
Referees: Jorge Vázquez (PUR), Marius Ciulin (ROU), Zafer Yılmaz (TUR)

=== Israel v Lithuania ===
2 September 2017
21:30

Boxscore

| Israel | 73–88 | Lithuania |
Scoring by quarter: 23–19, 14–19, 14–33, 22–17
| Pts: Howell 20; Rebs: Casspi 5 Asts: Mekel 4 | | Pts: Ulanovas 18; Rebs: Valančiūnas 10; Asts: Mačiulis 5 |

Menora Mivtachim Arena, Tel Aviv
Attendance: 9,926
Referees: Leandro Lezcano (ARG), Radomir Vojinović (MNE), Ademir Zurapović (BIH)

=== Georgia v Ukraine ===
3 September 2017
15:45

Boxscore

| Georgia | 81–88 | Ukraine |
Scoring by quarter: 20–21, 18–30, 25–16, 18–21
| Pts: Pachulia, Shermadini 17; Rebs: Pachulia, Shengelia 5 Asts: Shengelia 7 | | Pts: Pustovyi 19; Rebs: Pustovyi 7 Asts: Lukashov 11 |

Menora Mivtachim Arena, Tel Aviv
Attendance: 1,167
Referees: Leandro Lezcano (ARG), Saša Maričić (SRB), Radomir Vojinović (MNE)

=== Lithuania v Italy ===
3 September 2017
18:30

Boxscore

| Lithuania | 78–73 | Italy |
Scoring by quarter: 23–23, 18–9, 16–17, 21–24
| Pts: Juškevičius 20; Rebs: Valančiūnas 8 Asts: Kalnietis 8 | | Pts: Datome 24; Rebs: Cusin 4 Asts: Filloy 5 |

Menora Mivtachim Arena, Tel Aviv
Attendance: 2,680
Referees: Vicente Bultó (ESP), Gentian Cici (ALB), Ademir Zurapović (BIH)

=== Germany v Israel ===
3 September 2017
21:30

Boxscore

| Germany | 80–82 | Israel |
Scoring by quarter: 18–23, 25–20, 26–14, 11–25
| Pts: Schröder 20; Rebs: Theis 15; Asts: Schröder 7 | | Pts: Howell 23; Rebs: Casspi 11; Asts: Mekel 4 |

Menora Mivtachim Arena, Tel Aviv
Attendance: 8,843
Referees: Jorge Vázquez (PUR), Ventsislav Velikov (BUL), Yener Yılmaz (TUR)

=== Ukraine v Lithuania ===
5 September 2017
15:45

Boxscore

| Ukraine | 62–94 | Lithuania |
Scoring by quarter: 10–27, 20–17, 17–28, 15–22
| Pts: Pustovyi 29; Rebs: Korniyenko 9 Asts: Lypovyy 5 | | Pts: Valančiūnas 22; Rebs: Valančiūnas 14; Asts: Kalnietis 11 |

Menora Mivtachim Arena, Tel Aviv
Attendance: 1,331
Referees: Leandro Lezcano (ARG), Marius Ciulin (ROU), Ventsislav Velikov (BUL)

=== Italy v Germany ===
5 September 2017
18:30

Boxscore

| Italy | 55–61 | Germany |
Scoring by quarter: 17–16, 12–13, 9–14, 17–18
| Pts: Filloy 15; Rebs: Datome 7 Asts: Belinelli, Melli 2 | | Pts: Schröder 17; Rebs: Voigtmann 7 Asts: Voigtmann 5 |

Menora Mivtachim Arena, Tel Aviv
Attendance: 2,250
Referees: Vicente Bultó (ESP), Saša Maričić (SRB), Gentian Cici (ALB)

=== Israel v Georgia ===
5 September 2017
21:30

Boxscore

| Israel | 91–104 (OT) | Georgia |
Scoring by quarter: 22–21, 27–26, 21–20, 19–22, Overtime: 2–15
| Pts: Mekel 23; Rebs: Casspi 6 Asts: Eliyahu 6 | | Pts: Shengelia 25; Rebs: Shengelia 19; Asts: Dixon 7 |

Menora Mivtachim Arena, Tel Aviv
Attendance: 9,046
Referees: Ademir Zurapović (BIH), Yener Yılmaz (TUR), Radomir Vojinović (MNE)

=== Germany v Lithuania ===
6 September 2017
14:45

Boxscore

| Germany | 72–89 | Lithuania |
Scoring by quarter: 19–23, 24–24, 17–25, 12–17
| Pts: Schröder 26; Rebs: Tadda 8 Asts: Tadda 6 | | Pts: Valančiūnas 27; Rebs: Valančiūnas 15; Asts: Kalnietis 9 |

Menora Mivtachim Arena, Tel Aviv
Attendance: 1,680
Referees: Vicente Bultó (ESP), Gentian Cici (ALB), Ademir Zurapović (BIH)

=== Georgia v Italy ===
6 September 2017
17:30

Boxscore

| Georgia | 69–71 | Italy |
Scoring by quarter: 10–27, 20–11, 17–20, 22–13
| Pts: Dixon 29; Rebs: Pachulia 12; Asts: three players 2 | | Pts: Belinelli 15; Rebs: Aradori, Cusin 7 Asts: Datome, Filloy 4 |

Menora Mivtachim Arena, Tel Aviv
Attendance: 1,746
Referees: Jorge Vázquez (PUR), Saša Maričić (SRB), Radomir Vojinović (MNE)

=== Israel v Ukraine ===
6 September 2017
20:45

Boxscore

| Israel | 64–88 | Ukraine |
Scoring by quarter: 16–19, 12–27, 11–25, 25–17
| Pts: Eliyahu 12; Rebs: Eliyahu 5 Asts: Eliyahu 6 | | Pts: Kravtsov 17; Rebs: Kravtsov, Pustovyi 7 Asts: Lukashov 7 |

Menora Mivtachim Arena, Tel Aviv
Attendance: 5,036
Referees: Leandro Lezcano (ARG), Marius Ciulin (ROU), Yener Yılmaz (TUR)
