= EuroBasket 2017 Group A =

Group A of EuroBasket 2017 consisted of Finland, France, Greece, Iceland, Poland and Slovenia. The games were played between 31 August and 6 September 2017. All games were played at the Hartwall Arena in Helsinki, Finland.

== Standings ==
Pos	Team	Pld	W	L	PF	PA	PD	Pts	Qualification
1	Slovenia	5	5	0	446	384	+62	10	Knockout stage
2	Finland (H)	5	4	1	426	408	+18	9	Knockout stage
3	France	5	3	2	450	422	+28	8	Knockout stage
4	Greece	5	2	3	421	400	+21	7	Knockout stage
5	Poland	5	1	4	411	414	−3	6	
6	Iceland	5	0	5	355	481	−126	5	

Source: EuroBasket
Rules for classification: 1) Points. 2) Head-to-head results. 3) Points difference. 4) Points scored.
(H) Hosts

All times are local (UTC+3).

== Matches ==
=== Slovenia v Poland ===
31 August 2017
13:45

Boxscore

Slovenia	90–81	Poland
Scoring by quarter: 24–22, 29–24, 21–12, 16–23
Pts: Dragić 30; Rebs: Randolph 10; Asts: Dončić 6		Pts: Ponitka 22; Rebs: Ponitka 13; Asts: Slaughter 6

Hartwall Arena, Helsinki
Attendance: 835
Referees: Cristiano Maranho (BRA), Apostolos Kalpakas (SWE), Arnis Ozols (LAT)

=== Iceland v Greece ===
31 August 2017
16:30

Boxscore

Iceland	61–90	Greece
Scoring by quarter: 10–26, 23–11, 12–24, 16–29
Pts: Pálsson 21; Rebs: Ermolinskij, Pálsson 4 Asts: Ermolinskij 5		Pts: Pappas 20; Rebs: Bourousis 8 Asts: Bourousis 4

Hartwall Arena, Helsinki
Attendance: 1,911
Referees: Aleksandar Glišić (SRB), Takaki Kato (JPN), Petar Obradović (BIH)

=== France v Finland ===
31 August 2017
20:00

Boxscore

France	84–86 (OT)	Finland
Scoring by quarter: 15–23, 18–9, 20–17, 19–23, Overtime: 12–14
Pts: Fournier 25; Rebs: Diaw 9 Asts: three players 3		Pts: Markkanen 22; Rebs: Markkanen 7 Asts: Koponen 8

Hartwall Arena, Helsinki
Attendance: 12,167
Referees: Antonio Conde (ESP), Zafer Yılmaz (TUR), Mārtiņš Kozlovskis (LAT)

=== Poland v Iceland ===
2 September 2017
13:45

Boxscore

Poland	91–61	Iceland
Scoring by quarter: 16–14, 25–15, 19–8, 31–24
Pts: Waczyński 15; Rebs: Ponitka 10; Asts: Koszarek 5		Pts: Vilhjálmsson 16; Rebs: Bæringsson 8 Asts: Friðriksson 3

Hartwall Arena, Helsinki
Attendance: 3,618
Referees: Petar Obradović (BIH), Alexey Davydov (RUS), Mārtiņš Kozlovskis (LAT)

=== Greece v France ===
2 September 2017
16:30

Boxscore

Greece	87–95	France
Scoring by quarter: 15–27, 21–28, 21–20, 30–20
Pts: Printezis 22; Rebs: Antetokounmpo 6 Asts: Sloukas 7		Pts: Fournier, Lauvergne 21; Rebs: Lauvergne 11; Asts: three players 4

Hartwall Arena, Helsinki
Attendance: 5,013
Referees: Cristiano Maranho (BRA), Antonio Conde (ESP), Takaki Kato (JPN)

=== Finland v Slovenia ===
2 September 2017
20:00

Boxscore

Finland	78–81	Slovenia
Scoring by quarter: 22–22, 20–30, 21–13, 15–16
Pts: Markkanen 24; Rebs: Huff 8 Asts: Koponen 9		Pts: Dragić 29; Rebs: Dončić 8 Asts: Vidmar 6

Hartwall Arena, Helsinki
Attendance: 11,963
Referees: Aleksandar Glišić (SRB), Apostolos Kalpakas (SWE), Yener Yılmaz (TUR)

=== France v Iceland ===
3 September 2017
13:45

Boxscore

France	115–79	Iceland
Scoring by quarter: 29–25, 20–17, 37–14, 29–23
Pts: De Colo 16; Rebs: Heurtel 6 Asts: Heurtel 6		Pts: Stefánsson 23; Rebs: Acox 7 Asts: Vilhjálmsson 6

Hartwall Arena, Helsinki
Attendance: 3,396
Referees: Takaki Kato (JPN), Apostolos Kalpakas (SWE), Arnis Ozols (LAT)

=== Slovenia v Greece ===
3 September 2017
16:30

Boxscore

Slovenia	78–72	Greece
Scoring by quarter: 23–13, 12–17, 17–28, 26–14
Pts: Dončić 22; Rebs: Vidmar 9 Asts: Dragić 4		Pts: Sloukas 18; Rebs: Printezis 10; Asts: Sloukas 6

Hartwall Arena, Helsinki
Attendance: 4,099
Referees: Cristiano Maranho (BRA), Antonio Conde (ESP), Mārtiņš Kozlovskis (LAT)

=== Finland v Poland ===
3 September 2017
20:00

Boxscore

Finland	90–87 (2OT)	Poland
Scoring by quarter: 18–8, 18–24, 16–20, 14–14, Overtime: 12–12, 12–9
Pts: Markkanen 27; Rebs: Markkanen 9 Asts: Koponen 7		Pts: Waczyński 18; Rebs: Kulig 7 Asts: Koszarek 4

Hartwall Arena, Helsinki
Attendance: 11,360
Referees: Aleksandar Glišić (SRB), Alexey Davydov (RUS), Petar Obradović (BIH)

=== Iceland v Slovenia ===
5 September 2017
13:45

Boxscore

Iceland	75–102	Slovenia
Scoring by quarter: 25–23, 18–37, 16–21, 16–21
Pts: Hermannsson 18; Rebs: Ermolinskij 6 Asts: Hermannsson 4		Pts: Dragić 21; Rebs: Dončić 7 Asts: Vidmar 6

Hartwall Arena, Helsinki
Attendance: 1,531
Referees: Aleksandar Glišić (SRB), Zafer Yılmaz (TUR), Apostolos Kalpakas (SWE)

=== Poland v France ===
5 September 2017
16:30

Boxscore

Poland	75–78	France
Scoring by quarter: 20–13, 14–13, 18–25, 23–27
Pts: Waczyński 15; Rebs: Kulig 8 Asts: Koszarek, Waczyński 4		Pts: Heurtel 23; Rebs: Lauvergne 11; Asts: Heurtel 6

Hartwall Arena, Helsinki
Attendance: 1,868
Referees: Antonio Conde (ESP), Alexey Davydov (RUS), Arnis Ozols (LAT)

=== Greece v Finland ===
5 September 2017
20:00

Boxscore

Greece	77–89	Finland
Scoring by quarter: 14–23, 19–22, 19–22, 25–22
Pts: Antetokounmpo 17; Rebs: Agravanis 6 Asts: Calathes 5		Pts: Koponen 24; Rebs: Markkanen 6 Asts: Koponen 6

Hartwall Arena, Helsinki
Attendance: 12,327
Referees: Takaki Kato (JPN), Petar Obradović (BIH), Mārtiņš Kozlovskis (LAT)

=== Slovenia v France ===
6 September 2017
14:45

Boxscore

Slovenia	95–78	France
Scoring by quarter: 28–22, 24–13, 25–16, 18–27
Pts: Dragić 22; Rebs: Dončić 9 Asts: Dragić 8		Pts: De Colo 16; Rebs: three players 5 Asts: Heurtel 5

Hartwall Arena, Helsinki
Attendance: 3,166
Referees: Antonio Conde (ESP), Takaki Kato (JPN), Mārtiņš Kozlovskis (LAT)

=== Greece v Poland ===
6 September 2017
17:30

Boxscore

Greece	95–77	Poland
Scoring by quarter: 23–29, 26–14, 21–24, 25–10
Pts: Sloukas 26; Rebs: Papagiannis 8 Asts: Calathes 10		Pts: Kulig 26; Rebs: Kulig 7 Asts: Koszarek 9

Hartwall Arena, Helsinki
Attendance: 3,666
Referees: Cristiano Maranho (BRA), Aleksandar Glišić (SRB), Petar Obradović (BIH)

=== Finland v Iceland ===
6 September 2017
20:45

Boxscore

Finland	83–79	Iceland
Scoring by quarter: 24–18, 18–22, 10–19, 31–20
Pts: Markkanen 23; Rebs: Lee 8 Asts: Koponen 4		Pts: Stefánsson 13; Rebs: Hermannsson, Ermolinskij 5 Asts: three players 5

Hartwall Arena, Helsinki
Attendance: 12,037
Referees: Zafer Yılmaz (TUR), Alexey Davydov (RUS), Apostolos Kalpakas (SWE)
