= EuroBasket 2017 Group D =

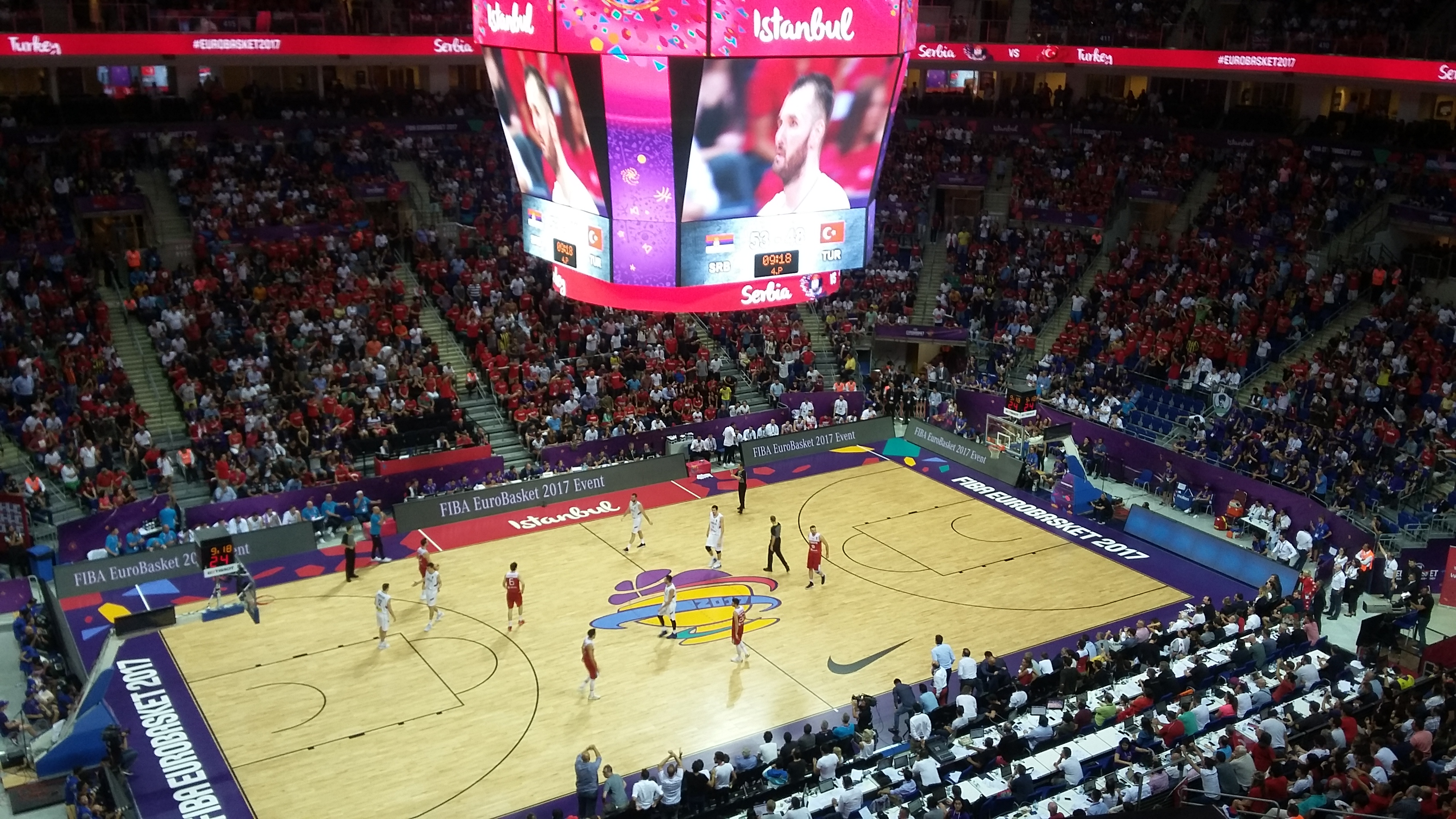
Serbia vs Turkey encounter in Ülker Sports Arena

Group D of EuroBasket 2017 consisted of Belgium, Great Britain, Latvia, Russia, Serbia and Turkey. The games were played between 1 and 7 September 2017. All games were played at the Ülker Sports Arena in Istanbul, Turkey.

== Standings ==
Pos	Team	Pld	W	L	PF	PA	PD	Pts	Qualification
1	Serbia	5	4	1	400	353	+47	9 (Note: Serbia 3 Pts, +7 PD; Latvia 3 Pts, +5 PD; Russia 3 Pts, −12 PD)	Knockout stage
2	Latvia	5	4	1	444	396	+48	9	Knockout stage
3	Russia	5	4	1	378	366	+12	9	Knockout stage
4	Turkey (H)	5	2	3	388	380	+8	7	Knockout stage
5	Belgium	5	1	4	353	410	−57	6	
6	Great Britain	5	0	5	390	448	−58	5	

Source: EuroBasket
Rules for classification: 1) Points; 2) Head-to-head results; 3) Points difference; 4) Points scored.
(H) Hosts
Notes:

All times are local (UTC+3).

== Matches ==
=== Belgium v Great Britain ===
1 September 2017
14:15

Boxscore

Belgium	103–90	Great Britain
Scoring by quarter: 24–26, 30–27, 19–14, 30–23
Pts: De Zeeuw 21; Rebs: De Zeeuw 7 Asts: Van Rossom 5		Pts: Olaseni 21; Rebs: Olaseni 11; Asts: Clark 5

Ülker Sports Arena, Istanbul
Attendance: 322
Referees: Saverio Lanzarini (ITA), Ferdinand Pascual (PHI), Georgios Poursanidis (GRE)

=== Serbia v Latvia ===
1 September 2017
17:00

Boxscore

Serbia	92–82	Latvia
Scoring by quarter: 21–24, 24–23, 20–13, 27–22
Pts: Bogdanović 30; Rebs: Mačvan 10; Asts: Jović 8		Pts: Dai. Bertāns 23; Rebs: Dāv. Bertāns, Timma 6 Asts: Dai. Bertāns 6

Ülker Sports Arena, Istanbul
Attendance: 1,050
Referees: Marek Cmikiewicz (POL), Tomas Jasevičius (LTU), Martin Horozov (BUL)

=== Turkey v Russia ===
1 September 2017
21:00

Boxscore

Turkey	73–76	Russia
Scoring by quarter: 15–20, 18–16, 18–19, 22–21
Pts: Osman 28; Rebs: Osman 7 Asts: Osman 4		Pts: Shved 22; Rebs: Mozgov 9 Asts: Fridzon, Shved 4

Ülker Sports Arena, Istanbul
Attendance: 7,286
Referees: Michael Weiland (CAN), Manuel Mazzoni (ITA), Milan Nedović (SLO)

=== Latvia v Belgium ===
2 September 2017
14:15

Boxscore

Latvia	92–64	Belgium
Scoring by quarter: 24–25, 23–8, 16–22, 29–9
Pts: Porziņģis, Timma 27; Rebs: Timma 7 Asts: Strēlnieks 13		Pts: Hervelle 12; Rebs: three players 5 Asts: Tabu 6

Ülker Sports Arena, Istanbul
Attendance: 1,038
Referees: Tomas Jasevičius (LTU), Martin Horozov (BUL), Milan Nedović (SLO)

=== Russia v Serbia ===
2 September 2017
17:00

Boxscore

Russia	75–72	Serbia
Scoring by quarter: 18–21, 22–17, 18–13, 17–21
Pts: Shved 22; Rebs: Mozgov 8 Asts: Khvostov, Vorontsevich 5		Pts: Bogdanović, Marjanović 19; Rebs: Kuzmić, Marjanović 6 Asts: Jović 7

Ülker Sports Arena, Istanbul
Attendance: 1,603
Referees: Saverio Lanzarini (ITA), Manuel Mazzoni (ITA), Georgios Poursanidis (GRE)

=== Great Britain v Turkey ===
2 September 2017
21:00

Boxscore

Great Britain	70–84	Turkey
Scoring by quarter: 18–23, 18–26, 18–15, 16–20
Pts: Lawrence, Olaseni 15; Rebs: Olaseni 14; Asts: Lawrence, Okereafor 5		Pts: Mahmutoğlu 24; Rebs: Osman 7 Asts: Mahmutoğlu 6

Ülker Sports Arena, Istanbul
Attendance: 5,538
Referees: Marek Cmikiewicz (POL), Aleksandar Milojević (MNE), Ferdinand Pascual (PHI)

=== Latvia v Great Britain ===
4 September 2017
14:15

Boxscore

Latvia	97–92	Great Britain
Scoring by quarter: 25–20, 25–20, 34–18, 13–34
Pts: Porziņģis 28; Rebs: Timma 9 Asts: Strēlnieks 9		Pts: Olaseni 23; Rebs: Olaseni 10; Asts: Lawrence 10

Ülker Sports Arena, Istanbul
Attendance: 817
Referees: Saverio Lanzarini (ITA), Aleksandar Milojević (MNE), Milan Nedović (SLO)

=== Belgium v Russia ===
4 September 2017
17:00

Boxscore

Belgium	67–76	Russia
Scoring by quarter: 18–19, 15–16, 14–18, 20–23
Pts: De Zeeuw 15; Rebs: Serron 5 Asts: Hervelle, Tabu 5		Pts: Shved 20; Rebs: Vorontsevich 10; Asts: Shved 6

Ülker Sports Arena, Istanbul
Attendance: 1,144
Referees: Michael Weiland (CAN), Martin Horozov (BUL), Georgios Poursanidis (GRE)

=== Serbia v Turkey ===
4 September 2017
21:00

Boxscore

Serbia	80–74	Turkey
Scoring by quarter: 21–13, 15–18, 17–14, 27–29
Pts: Bogdanović 17; Rebs: Lučić 9 Asts: Jović 9		Pts: Mahmutoğlu 19; Rebs: Erden 5 Asts: Osman 5

Ülker Sports Arena, Istanbul
Attendance: 9,692
Referees: Marek Cmikiewicz (POL), Tomas Jasevičius (LTU), Manuel Mazzoni (ITA)

=== Russia v Latvia ===
5 September 2017
14:15

Boxscore

Russia	69–84	Latvia
Scoring by quarter: 15–12, 29–22, 8–18, 17–32
Pts: Shved 21; Rebs: Kurbanov, Mozgov 6 Asts: Shved 6		Pts: Timma 22; Rebs: Timma 6 Asts: Dai. Bertāns 6

Ülker Sports Arena, Istanbul
Attendance: 944
Referees: Marek Cmikiewicz (POL), Manuel Mazzoni (ITA), Aleksandar Milojević (MKD)

=== Great Britain v Serbia ===
5 September 2017
17:00

Boxscore

Great Britain	68–82	Serbia
Scoring by quarter: 14–25, 24–22, 17–18, 13–17
Pts: Okereafor 17; Rebs: Olaseni 13; Asts: Okereafor 4		Pts: Bogdanović 18; Rebs: Bogdanović 7 Asts: Bogdanović 7

Ülker Sports Arena, Istanbul
Attendance: 1,080
Referees: Georgios Poursanidis (GRE), Michael Weiland (CAN), Martin Horozov (BUL)

=== Turkey v Belgium ===
5 September 2017
21:00

Boxscore

Turkey	78–65	Belgium
Scoring by quarter: 23–14, 17–19, 15–20, 23–12
Pts: Korkmaz 14; Rebs: Hersek 4 Asts: Erden 5		Pts: Van Rossom 13; Rebs: Serron, Van Rossom 5 Asts: Tabu 4

Ülker Sports Arena, Istanbul
Attendance: 7,919
Referees: Saverio Lanzarini (ITA), Milan Nedović (SLO), Ferdinand Pascual (PHI)

=== Russia v Great Britain ===
7 September 2017
14:30

Boxscore

Russia	82–70	Great Britain
Scoring by quarter: 23–16, 20–15, 18–23, 21–16
Pts: Shved 30; Rebs: Mozgov 11; Asts: Shved 8		Pts: Clark 21; Rebs: Olaseni 9 Asts: Clark 6

Ülker Sports Arena, Istanbul
Attendance: 529
Referees: Georgios Poursanidis (GRE), Aleksandar Milojević (MKD), Ferdinand Pascual (PHI)

=== Belgium v Serbia ===
7 September 2017
17:15

Boxscore

Belgium	54–74	Serbia
Scoring by quarter: 13–18, 12–24, 11–14, 18–18
Pts: Lecomte 12; Rebs: Van Rossom, Tumba 5 Asts: Tabu 4		Pts: Marjanović 22; Rebs: Micić 9 Asts: Bogdanović 9

Ülker Sports Arena, Istanbul
Attendance: 761
Referees: Manuel Mazzoni (ITA), Marek Cmikiewicz (POL), Martin Horozov (BUL)

=== Latvia v Turkey ===
7 September 2017
20:45

Boxscore

Latvia	89–79	Turkey
Scoring by quarter: 24–22, 23–16, 22–25, 20–16
Pts: Porziņģis 28; Rebs: Porziņģis 7 Asts: Timma 7		Pts: Osman 24; Rebs: Mahmutoğlu 7 Asts: Osman 5

Ülker Sports Arena, Istanbul
Attendance: 10,323
Referees: Saverio Lanzarini (ITA), Tomas Jasevičius (LTU), Michael Weiland (CAN)
