= Klemen Prepelič =

Slovenian basketball player (born 1992)

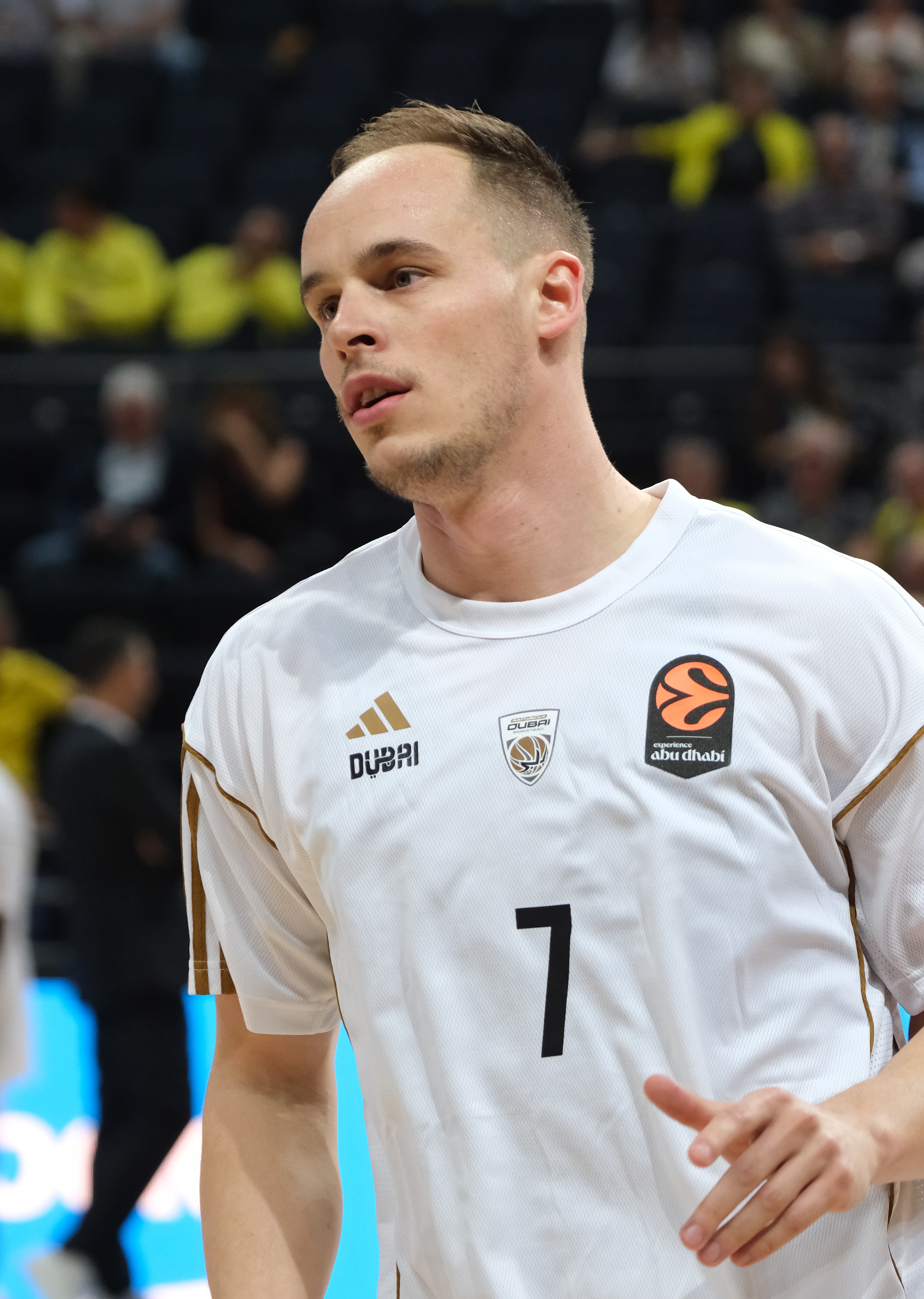
- Prepelič with Dubai Basketball in 2025

No. 7 – Dubai Basketball
- Position: Shooting guard
- League: ABA League; EuroLeague

Personal information
- Born: 20 October 1992 (age 34) Maribor, Slovenia
- Listed height: 1.91 m (6 ft 3 in)
- Listed weight: 90 kg (198 lb)

Career information
- NBA draft: 2014: undrafted
- Playing career: 2009–present

Career history
- 2009–2010: Branik Maribor
- 2010–2012: Helios Domžale
- 2012–2013: Union Olimpija
- 2013–2014: Banvit
- 2014–2015: Union Olimpija
- 2015–2016: Oldenburg
- 2016–2017: Limoges
- 2017–2018: Levallois Metropolitans
- 2018–2020: Real Madrid
- 2019–2020: →Joventut Badalona
- 2020–2023: Valencia
- 2023: Cedevita Olimpija
- 2023–2024: Galatasaray
- 2024–present: Dubai Basketball

Career highlights
- All-Liga ACB First Team (2020); Liga ACB Top Scorer (2020); Liga ACB champion (2019); ABA League champion (2026); Spanish Supercup champion (2018); Slovenian Cup winner (2013)
Medals
Men's basketball
Representing Slovenia
EuroBasket
Gold medal – first place	2017 Finland–Israel–Romania–Turkey

Klemen Prepelič (born 20 October 1992) is a Slovenian professional basketball player and the team captain for Dubai Basketball of the ABA League and the EuroLeague. He also represents the Slovenian national basketball team internationally. Standing at 1.91 m (6 ft 3 in), he plays at the shooting guard position.

== Professional career ==
Prepelič started playing basketball for Domžale-based club Helios Domžale (today the Helios Suns). In 30 Slovenian Basketball League games for Helios he averaged 16.7 points, 3.7 assists, and 2.9 rebounds. In the 2011–12 ABA League he played 26 games, averaging 14.2 points, 2.9 assists and 2.4 rebounds.

=== Olimpija (2012–2013) ===
On 23 August 2012, Prepelič signed a three-year contract with Slovenian club Union Olimpija. In his first period at Olimpija, he won the 2013 Slovenian Basketball Cup. During his first season at Olimpija he played 15 games and averaged 7.6 points, 2.35 assists and 2.6 rebounds in the 2012–13 Slovenian Basketball League. He played 26 games in the 2012–13 ABA League, averaging 11.4 points, 2.46 assists and 2.46 rebounds. In 10 games in the 2012–13 Euroleague, his first season in EuroLeague, he averaged 8.9 points, 2 assists and 2 rebounds for Olimpija. Prepelič was the scoring leader in Olimpija's win over Khimki in Euroleague, and scored the clutch three-pointer at the buzzer that gave Olimpija a 74–72 win.

=== Banvit (2013–2014) ===
After one season at Olimpija, Prepelič moved to Turkey, signing a three-year contract with Banvit from Bandirma on 29 July 2013. He left Banvit after one season. In his only season at Banvit he played 27 games in the 2013–14 Turkish Basketball League and averaged 5.4 points, 1.1 assists and 1.2 rebounds. In 16 games in the 2013–14 Eurocup Basketball he averaged 6.1 points and 2 rebounds.

=== Return to Olimpija (2014–2015) ===
On 1 November 2014, he returned to Union Olimpija, signing a contract for the rest of the 2014–15 season. He played 13 games in the 2014–15 Eurocup Basketball with Olimpija, averaging 7.23 points, 2.6 assists and 1.9 rebounds. In 12 games of the 2014–15 Slovenian Basketball League he averaged 14 points, 2.5 assists and 2.8 rebounds. In his last season in ABA League he averaged 11 points, 2.5 assists and 1.9 rebounds in 21 games played.

=== Oldenburg (2015–2016) ===
On 14 September 2015, Prepelič signed a short-term deal with German club Baskets Oldenburg. On 21 October 2015, he re-signed with Oldenburg for the rest of the season. In his season at Oldenburg he played 15 games in the 2015–16 Eurocup Basketball, averaging 8.4 points, 2.7 assists and 2.2 rebounds. Prepelič posted a double-double of 23 points and 10 assists in a 97–86 win over Eisbären Bremerhaven in the Basketball Bundesliga, in which he played 33 games and averaged 10 points, 3 assists and 3 rebounds. In a game against Tigers Tübingen in the Basketball Bundesliga, Prepelič nailed two half-court shots in the same game.

=== Limoges (2016–2017) ===
On 28 June 2016, Prepelič signed with Limoges CSP for the 2016–17 season. In 33 games in the 2016–17 Pro A season, he averaged 16 points, 4 assists and 2.7 rebounds with the French club.

=== Levallois (2017–2018) ===
On 13 July 2017, Prepelič signed with Levallois Metropolitans for the 2017–18 season. In 9 games of the 2017–18 EuroCup Basketball, he averaged 15.7 points, 1.8 assists, and 1.9 rebounds. He posted a double-double in a 93–75 home win over Hyères-Toulon in the 2017–18 Pro A season, in which he played 31 games, averaging 15.4 points, 3 assists and 2.8 rebounds.

=== Real Madrid (2018–2019) ===
On 9 July 2018, Prepelič signed a two-year deal with Real Madrid of the Liga ACB and the EuroLeague, and went on to help the team to reach the Final Four and win the Spanish league. He was one of the best players in the 2018 Supercopa de España de Baloncesto final, scoring 13 points off the bench in the final. Upon entering the game, he scored a two-pointer and two three-pointers in rapid succession, and was fundamental in Real Madrid's comeback. He played 22 games for Real Madrid in the 2018–19 ACB season, and averaged 4.2 points and 1 assist, with .730 free-throw percentage. He played 21 games in the 2018–19 EuroLeague with Real Madrid, averaging 3.8 points, 1.7 assists and 1 rebound. In addition to the 15th edition of the Supercopa de España de Baloncesto, he also won the 2018–19 ACB, Real Madrid's 35th league title.

=== Joventut Badalona (2019–2020) ===
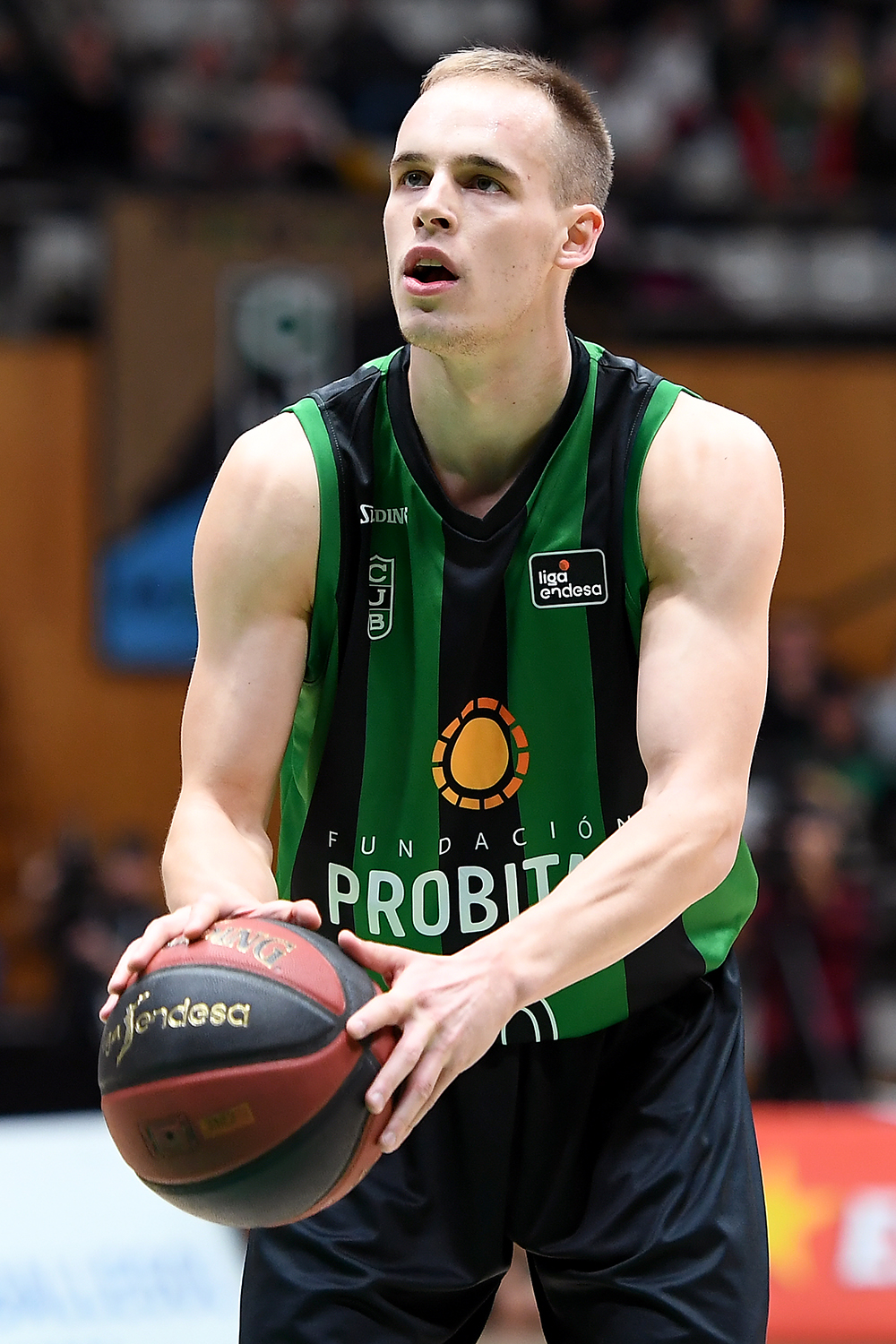
Prepelič with Joventut in 2019

On 6 August 2019, Prepelič was loaned to Joventut Badalona for the 2019–20 season. In May he had been informed by Real Madrid that Jaycee Carroll would play another season at the club, after he changed his mind about retiring, and therefore advised to "look for other options." Prepelič stated that if someone had asked him, in May, whether he would return to Real Madrid, he would've said yes, since he wanted another shot at the club. In the end, however, his move to Joventut proved very beneficial for his career. He had an extremely positive season at Joventut. Prepelič played 15 games in the 2019–20 EuroCup Basketball, averaging 17 points, 4 assists and 2.3 rebounds. In 27 games in the 2019–20 ACB season he averaged 22.5 points, 3 assists and 1.7 rebounds. Prepelič was the top-scorer of the 2019-20 ACB regular season, and the third most valued player with 19.6 credits. He was one of the top-five players of the season, and the best in his position. He was the third-best scorer in the 2019–20 EuroCup, ranking first in free throws made (5.5) and fouls drawn (7.1).

Prepelič led Joventut to a win in their 2020 EuroCup debut against Brescia. He scored 5 points to bring the score from 41–41 to 46–43. Soon Prepelič converted another and-one opportunity for 8 points. Prepelič scored and assisted again, getting Joventut back on track in the 4th quarter with the first score and also scoring a big three-pointer to restore the double-digit lead. Brescia recovered again, but Prepelič closed the game with another three-pointer and two consecutive assists. With a PIR of 25, thanks to 24 points, 4 rebounds and 5 assists, he was the best performer of the game. He was again the top performer in Joventut's second win against Darüşşafaka, when he first brought the score from 9–10 to 13–10 in the 1st quarter, then stole a ball and dished out two assists to recover from a 6-point deficit in the 2nd quarter. In the last minute of the game, he draw a foul and made 3 out of 3 free throws to bring the score to 82–82, and finally won the game with a buzzer-beater from his own foul line.

He recorded 30 points, 4 assists and 2 rebounds for a 35 PIR in the second leg against Darüşşafaka, eventually lost 92–86 by Joventut. He was the scoring and assists leader against his former club Olimpija, in Joventut's third win in the 2020 EuroCup. Scoring 15 points, Prepelič was the scoring leader in Joventut's win over BC UNICS. He instantly put his team ahead 8–2, scoring 6 points in the first minute and a half. As his team was down 47–51 in the 3rd quarter, he scored a three-pointer and dished out an assist to put Joventut ahead 53–51. They kept ahead until the end, eventually winning 90–73. He led his squad to an 88–84 comeback win against Tofas Bursa, recording 37 points, 7 assists, 12/12 free throws, and 10 fouls drawn in that game, for a 45 PIR. He was named 2019-20 EuroCup Top 16 Round 3 MVP.

At the end of the season Prepelič was included in the All-ACB First Team of the 2019–20 season.

=== Valencia (2020–2023) ===
On 4 July 2020, he signed with Valencia Basket of the Liga ACB. Prepelič had a very positive season at Valencia. In 32 games of the 2020–21 EuroLeague he averaged 12.1 points (career high in EuroLeague), 2.9 assists and 1.5 rebounds. In 40 games in the 2020–21 ACB season he averaged 11.6 points, 2.6 assists, and 1.73 rebounds. He helped Valencia to achieve 4th place in the Spanish league and to reach the playoffs semifinals. Valencia concluded the EuroLeague regular season 9th, just shy of the playoffs.

In the 2020–21 EuroLeague, he scored 13 points and dished out 4 assists against Žalgiris. He entered the 3rd quarter on a score of 51–51, and draw one foul, scored a two-pointer and a three-pointer for a 51–58 lead. He scored two more three-pointers to maintain Valencia's lead, leading to an eventual 82–94 win. He was among the top performers against Milano, recording 14 points and 5 assists for a 18 PIR. In the 4th quarter he recorded two three-pointers and one assist in less than two minutes to bring the score from 66–63 to 74–65. He was then substituted to re-enter the game on a 78–78 score and close it by performing a decisive block and dishing out a decisive assist.

He led Valencia past Panathinaikos, scoring 18 points and dishing out 7 assists for a PIR of 26. He was the top performer of the game. Within the first 5 minutes of the first quarter he recorded one assist and a two-pointer, attempted two times from behind the 3-point line and scored both times, pulling his team ahead three times, the last time 12–10. He entered the 2nd quarter and put his team ahead twice, first with an assist (35–34), and then making 2/2 free throws before shooting a three-pointer on the buzzer, bringing the score from 40–41 to 45–41. In the 3rd quarter Valencia was down by two points (47–49) and Prepelič scored his fourth three-pointer out of four attempts, to pull ahead 50–49. He then secured a 3-point lead of 55–52 by scoring a two-pointer. Valencia kept ahead in the 4th quarter, with Prepelič dishing out four assists therein. They eventually won 95–83.

He was Valencia's top performer against Maccabi Tel Aviv, with 22 pts, 3 astst and 2 rbs for a 24 PIR. In the 1st quarter he got Valencia ahead 14–7 with one assist, one two-pointer and two three-pointers out of two attempted. In the 2nd quarter he assisted Mike Tobey and scored two two-pointers to pull ahead 32–30. As they were down by three points in the 3rd quarter (47–50) he scored two three-pointers to tie at 50 and then get to 53–54. In the last minute, he, Van Rossom and Williams, scored 7 points for an 82–80 win. He scored 13 points against Fenerbahçe, including three consecutive go-ahead three-pointers, all in the decisive 4th quarter, with the score changing from 66–62 to 79–82, leading to an eventual 86–90 win. He stepped up and scored the clutch two-pointer at the buzzer that gave Valencia a 76–74 victory over eventual EuroLeague champion Anadolu Efes S.K.: a game-winning jumper with dribbling, in front of Doğuş Balbay (one of the best on-the-ball defenders in the EuroLeague). He was Valencia's top performer against CSKA Moscow, approaching triple-double with 22 points, 7 rebounds and 6 assists. With 24 points, 7 assists, 2 rebounds, and a 29 PIR, he was the top performer against Alba Berlin, which Valencia had to chase throughout the game up to the last minute for an eventual 86–90 win. He recorded 14 points and 2 assists against Baskonia. In the 3rd quarter he scored 6 points and dished out 2 assists, with the score changing from 47–56 to 60–59, and in the 4th quarter added 4 points and 1 assist. Valencia eventually won 86–81.

On 24 June 2023 Prepelič amicably parted ways with the Spanish club after three seasons together.

=== Cedevita Olimpija (2023) ===
On 23 October 2023 Prepelič signed with Cedevita Olimpija until the end of 2023.

=== Galatasaray (2023–2024) ===
On 7 December 2023 he signed with Galatasaray of the Turkish Basketbol Süper Ligi (BSL).

=== Dubai Basketball (2024–present) ===
On 25 July 2024, Prepelič signed with Dubai Basketball of the ABA League. On 2 March 2026, he signed a two-year extension with the club.

== International career ==
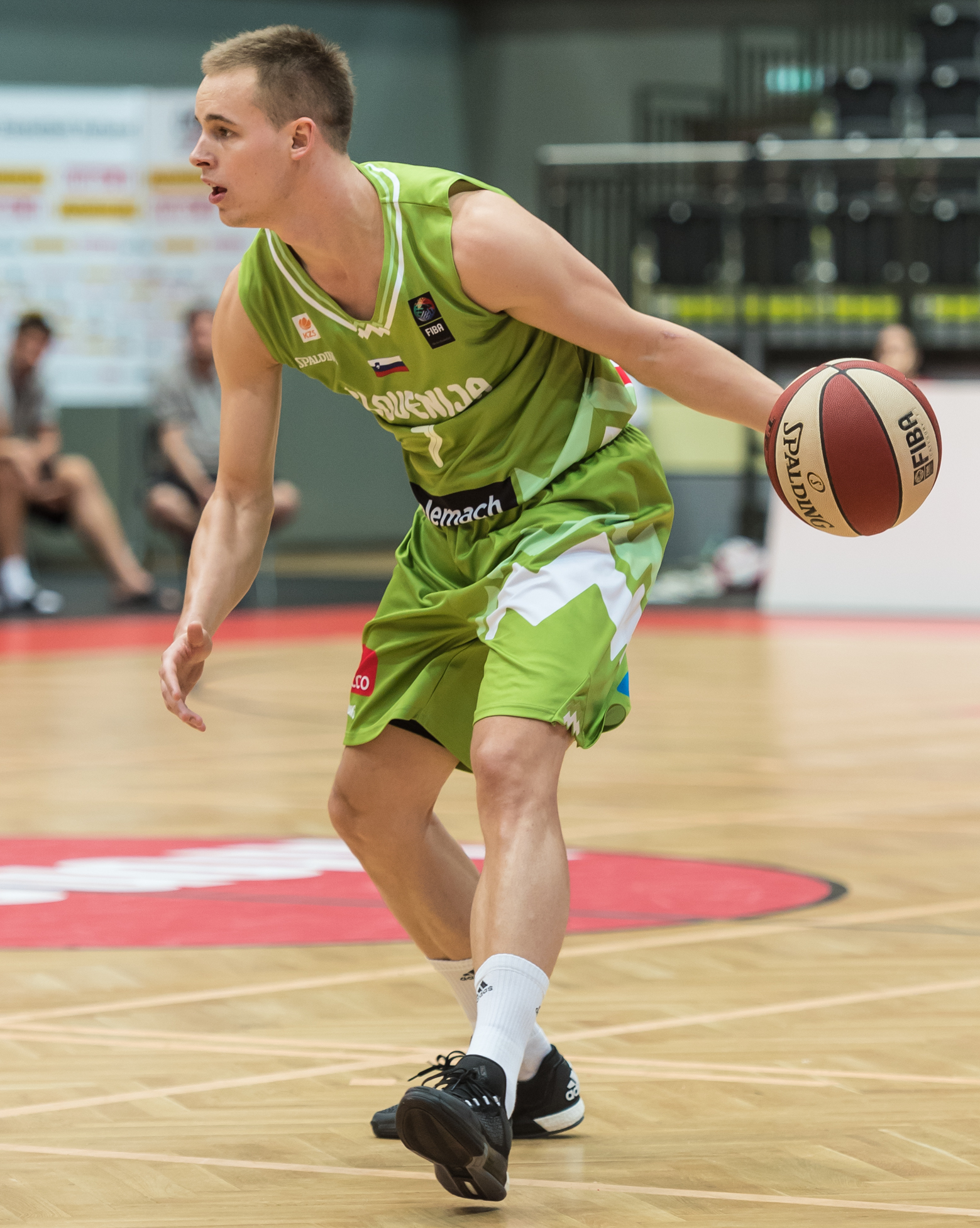
Prepelič with Slovenia in 2016

Prepelič took part in the 2012 FIBA Europe Under-20 Championship with Slovenia. He posted a double-double of 20 points and 11 assists against eventual champion Lithuania in the first round, 29 points and 4 assists against Turkey in the second round, and 17 points against France in the quarterfinals. He was included in the All-Tournament Team. Prepelič debuted for the Slovenian national basketball team at the 2014 World Cup. He also represented Slovenia at the EuroBasket 2015 where they were eliminated by Latvia in eighth finals.

He was among the protagonists of Slovenia's conquer of the gold at EuroBasket 2017, in which he had a key role, averaging 13.8 points and 2.3 assists, the best after Luka Dončić (14.3 and 3.6) and Goran Dragić (22.6 and 5.1). He scored 21 points in the final, also completing 3 assists and 4 rebounds. Prepelič pulled Slovenia ahead 80–78 with a go-ahead three-pointer in the 4th quarter, and then nailed the definitive go-ahead two-pointer, bringing the score to 84–82, with 2:20 to go. He then increased the lead with two free-throws, bringing the score to 88–82. Slovenia eventually defeated Serbia 93–85.

=== 2020 Summer Olympics ===
Prepelič scored 31 points and grabbed 2 rebounds in a preparatory friendly against Croatia. He made 6 three pointers out of 8 attempted, including a buzzer-beater from half-court. He and Dončić led Slovenia to a 112–72 victory over Poland in the Men's Olympic Qualifying Tournaments in Kaunas, scoring 18 and 17 points respectively.

He was the co-protagonist of Slovenia's win over Argentina with 22 points, 4 rebounds, 2 assists, 23 efficiency (the best after Dončić) and a field goal percentage of 75%. He was also among the top performers of the day. He stood out in the match against Japan for his leadership, 12 points, 5 assists, and 4 rebounds, and was the second assists leader. Prepelič was the hero of the match against Spain, won 87–95 by Slovenia. Dončić suffered a box-and-one defense, and Prepelič, who entered the match late in the first quarter, also received box-and-one defense from Sergio Llull. He eventually scored 15 points, 3 assists, 2 rebounds, also stealing 2 balls. He made 9 out of 10 free throws. He was Slovenia's third-scoring leader, and the most decisive player in the last part of the game. Prepelič scored the vital three-pointer that put his team ahead 86–85 at 2'30 from the end. Then, a minute and a half before the end he intercepted a ball before sending Tobey an alley-hoop which he dunked to close the game. With 13 seconds left to play he gave Slovenia a 3-point advantage by scoring two free throws. He, Tobey and Dragić were especially praised for their performances against Germany in the quarterfinal. He scored 9 points, all in the decisive fourth-period run, when Slovenia placed a final boost. Prepelič and Dončić gave the final blow to Germany, putting an advantage of 19 points. He scored one three-pointer, then attempted two more times from behind the line and scored both times.

Slovenia lost a dramatic semifinal to France by one point. The game seemed over for Slovenia, with France ahead 90–85 and less than a minute left to play. However, Slovenia "battled back behind Prepelic," who in a few seconds managed to score four points, bringing Slovenia just one point of France, 90–89: Dončić entrusted the ball to Prepelič at 35 seconds from the end, and he sunk a clutch three-pointer. After De Colo missed a layup, Dončić again renounced to shoot, and turned the clutch shoot over to Prepelič, who attempted a layup but was blocked by Nicolas Batum. After the game, Rudy Gobert stated that Batum's save was "one of the best blocks he had ever seen." Against France, Prepelič was one of Slovenia's best with Tobey and Dončić. He scored 18 points and 2 assists against Australia, in the bronze medal game, and approached double-double with 7 rebounds. He was Slovenia's top performer in that game. After entering the game towards the end of the first quarter, Prepelič turned it around for Slovenia with a go-ahead three-pointer. In the 3rd quarter he brought Slovenia within 60–66 with 3:30 left in the period, converting a four-point play. Prepelič scored 4 more points, and with a layup brought the score to 75–81 just before Australia's time-out, provoking an ovation from the Slovenian bench. He then scored another three-pointer; Slovenia managed to reach 80–83, but eventually lost 93–107.

With 15 points per game he was the 12th scoring leader of the men's basketball tournament heading into the finals, eventually raising it to 15.5 pts after playing Australia. He also averaged 3.33 rebounds, and with 2.7 assists was Slovenia's second assists leader.

Prepelič and Tobey were credited as Slovenia's best players at the Tokyo Olympics after Dončić. He was also ranked among the players who "should be on NBA radars" by the end of the tournament.

== Career statistics ==
Legend
GP	Games played	GS	Games started	MPG	Minutes per game
FG%	Field-goal percentage	3P%	3-point field-goal percentage	FT%	Free-throw percentage
RPG	Rebounds per game	APG	Assists per game	SPG	Steals per game
BPG	Blocks per game	PPG	Points per game	PIR	Performance index rating
**Bold**	Career high

=== EuroLeague ===
Year	Team	GP	GS	MPG	FG%	3P%	FT%	RPG	APG	SPG	BPG	PPG	PIR
2012–13	Union Olimpija	10	0	**22.8**	.338	.333	.808	**1.6**	2.0	**.7**	—	8.8	6.8
2018–19	Real Madrid	21	0	9.1	.382	.282	.739	.9	1.7	.1	.0	3.8	3.5
2020–21	Valencia	**32**	**11**	20.6	**.459**	**.415**	.901	1.4	2.8	.5	.0	**12.1**	**11.3**
2022–23	Valencia	27	**11**	18.5	.336	.269	**.943**	.7	**3.1**	.5	**.1**	7.1	6.9
2025–26	Dubai Basketball	27	6	13.4	.371	.321	.794	1.1	1.8	.4	—	3.6	3.3
Career		117	28	16.6	.396	.344	.874	1.1	2.4	.4	.0	7.2	6.7

=== EuroCup ===
Year	Team	GP	GS	MPG	FG%	3P%	FT%	RPG	APG	SPG	BPG	PPG	PIR
2013–14	Banvit	**16**	0	15.5	.405	.345	.760	2.0	.8	.4	—	6.1	5.7
2014–15	Union Olimpija	13	8	21.6	.284	.269	**.905**	1.8	2.6	.6	—	7.2	5.9
2015–16	Oldenburg	15	8	22.1	.317	.289	.837	2.2	2.7	.5	—	8.4	9.5
2017–18	Levallois	9	7	27.0	**.406**	**.393**	.837	1.8	1.8	.3	—	15.7	13.4
2019–20	Joventut Badalona	15	**15**	25.8	.384	.278	.838	2.3	**3.9**	**.9**	.1	**17.0**	**16.3**
2020–21	Valencia	14	4	23.0	.356	.333	.855	1.1	2.9	.3	—	14.2	8.9
2023–24	Cedevita Olimpija	6	0	**29.9**	.350	.250	.800	**2.7**	**8.7**	.3	**.2**	16.2	15.8
Career		88	42	22.6	.359	.306	.835	1.9	2.9	.5	.0	11.5	10.2

=== ABA League ===
Year	Team	GP	GS	MPG	FG%	3P%	FT%	RPG	APG	SPG	BPG	PPG	PIR
2011–12	Helios Domžale	26	19	**31.4**	.367	.298	.831	2.4	3.1	.9	**.1**	**14.2**	14.3
2012–13	Olimpija	26	1	25.2	.361	.319	.776	2.5	2.5	**1.1**	0	11.4	10.4
2014–15	Olimpija	21	14	22.4	.399	.364	.791	1.9	2.5	.8	0	10.8	11.5
2023–24	Cedevita Olimpija	6	0	26.7	.346	.326	**.897**	1.8	**8.2**	.0	0	**14.2**	**19.8**
2024–25	Dubai Basketball	**35**	**27**	24.3	**.447**	**.421**	.845	**3.2**	4.6	1.0	**.1**	11.3	15.5

=== Domestic leagues ===
Season	Team	League	GP	MPG	2P%	3P%	FT%	RPG	APG	SPG	BPG	PPG
2011–12	Helios Suns	SKL	30	**31.6**		.388	.879	2.9	**3.75**	1.1	.05	16.7
2012–13	Olimpija	SKL	15	25		.256	.750	2.6	2.35	**1.2**	.0	7.6
2013–14	Banvit	BSL	27	12.1		.333	.791	1.2	1.1	.4	.05	5.4
2014–15	Olimpija	SKL	12	27.1		**.402**	.870	2.75	2.5	.5	.0	14
2015–16	Oldenburg	BBL	33	23		.363	.910	**3**	3.2	.6	.05	9.9
2016–17	Limoges	ProA	33	30.2	.515	.351	.822	2.73	4	.9	.0	15.8
2017–18	Levallois	ProA	31	26.5	.509	.319	.839	2.77	3	.7	.05	15.4
2018–19	Real Madrid	ACB	22	11.1	.414	.298	.730	.5	1	1	.0	4.2
2019–20	Joventut Badalona	ACB	27	28	.540	.385	.868	1.8	3	.7	.0	**22.3**
2020–21	Valencia	ACB	**40**	20.5	**.631**	.344	**.948**	1.73	2.6	.6	.0	11.6
