= 2020 Slovenia men's Olympic basketball team =

Basketball at the Summer Olympics season
- Head coach: Aleksander Sekulić
- 2020 Summer Olympics: Fourth place
- Scoring leader: Luka Dončić 23.8
- Rebounding leader: Mike Tobey 10.5
- Assists leader: Luka Dončić 9.5
Home	Away

The men's national basketball team of Slovenia competed at the 2020 Summer Olympics in Tokyo. The team was captained by Edo Murić, while the Dallas Mavericks star Luka Dončić became the third best scorer and the best assist provider of the tournament; he was also included in the FIBA All-Star team of the tournament. This was the first appearance of Slovenia's basketball team at the Olympics.

Slovenia went undefeated in the group stage with three victories out of three games. In the quarter-finals, they eliminated Germany, before being stopped by France in the semi-finals in a close match, decided in the last seconds. In the bronze medal match, Slovenia lost to Australia, finishing the tournament in fourth place.

== Qualification ==
Slovenia qualified for the 2020 Summer Olympics after competing in the 2020 FIBA Men's Olympic Qualifying Tournaments, winning the tournament in Kaunas. They won all games in the Group B, defeating Poland and Angola. Klemen Prepelič and Luka Dončić led Slovenia to a 112–77 victory over Poland, scoring 18 and 17 points, respectively. In the Final round, they defeated Venezuela 98–70 in the semi-final, and were set to play against Lithuania in the final. Dončić went close to triple-double against Venezuela, scoring 23 points, 13 assists, and 9 rebounds. Slovenia defeated Lithuania 96–85 in Kaunas, led by Dončić (31 points, 11 rebounds, 13 assists), who with his triple-double sent Slovenia to their first Olympic appearance. On the other hand, Lithuania missed their first Olympics since the independence in 1990. Dončić was presented with the MVP award by Arvydas Sabonis after the win.

== Roster ==
The roster was announced on 17 July 2021.

Slovenia national basketball team roster
Players
Coaches

Pos.	No.	Name	Age – Date of birth	Height	Club	Ctr.
PG	5	Luka Rupnik	28 – 20 May 1993	1.86 m (6 ft 1 in)	Cedevita Olimpija	(Slovenia)
PG	6	Aleksej Nikolić	26 – 21 February 1995	1.91 m (6 ft 3 in)	BCM Gravelines-Dunkerque	(France)
SG	7	Klemen Prepelič	28 – 20 October 1992	1.89 m (6 ft 2 in)	Valencia	(Spain)
SF	8	Edo Murić (C)	29 – 27 November 1991	2.02 m (6 ft 8 in)	Cedevita Olimpija	(Slovenia)
C	10	Mike Tobey	26 – 10 October 1994	2.13 m (7 ft 0 in)	Valencia	(Spain)
SG	11	Jaka Blažič	31 – 30 June 1990	1.96 m (6 ft 5 in)	Cedevita Olimpija	(Slovenia)
SF	15	Gregor Hrovat	26 – 18 August 1994	1.96 m (6 ft 5 in)	Cholet Basket	(France)
C	27	Žiga Dimec	28 – 20 February 1993	2.11 m (6 ft 11 in)	Cedevita Olimpija	(Slovenia)
SF	30	Zoran Dragić	32 – 22 June 1989	1.96 m (6 ft 5 in)	Baskonia	(Spain)
SF	31	Vlatko Čančar	24 – 10 April 1997	2.03 m (6 ft 8 in)	Denver Nuggets	(United States)
SF	55	Jakob Čebašek	30 – 28 April 1991	2.00 m (6 ft 7 in)	Dinamo București	(Romania)
SF	77	Luka Dončić	22 – 28 February 1999	2.01 m (6 ft 7 in)	Dallas Mavericks	(United States)

Head coach

- (Slovenia) Aleksander Sekulić

Assistant coach(es)

- (Slovenia) Dalibor Damjanović
- (Slovenia) Dragiša Drobnjak
- (Slovenia) Jernej Valentinčič

Legend

- (C) Team captain
- Age – describes age
  on 25 July 2021

== Olympic play ==
=== Preliminary round ===
Slovenia competed in Group C in the opening round. Teams played in a round-robin format with the top three teams advancing to the quarter-finals. Slovenia ended group play with 3–0, and finished as the group's top seed.

Pos	Team	Pld	W	L	PF	PA	PD	Pts	Qualification
1	Slovenia	3	3	0	329	268	+61	6	Quarterfinals
2	Spain	3	2	1	256	243	+13	5	Quarterfinals
3	Argentina	3	1	2	268	276	−8	4	Quarterfinals
4	Japan (H)	3	0	3	235	301	−66	3	

Source: TOCOG and FIBA
Rules for classification: 1) classification points; 2) head-to-head results; 3) head-to-head game points difference; 4) head-to-head number of game points scored.
(H) Hosts

==== Argentina ====
26 July 2021
13:40
v

Boxscore

Argentina	100–118	Slovenia
Scoring by quarter: 24–32, 18–30, 24–26, 34–30
Pts: Scola 23; Rebs: Deck 8 Asts: Vildoza 5		Pts: Dončić 48; Rebs: Tobey 14; Asts: Dončić 5

Saitama Super Arena, Saitama
Referees: Steven Anderson (USA), Yohan Rosso (FRA), Yu Jung (TPE)

In the opening game, Slovenia beat Argentina 118–100, with strong performances by Luka Dončić (48 points, 11 rebounds, 5 assists), Klemen Prepelič (22 points), and Mike Tobey (11 points and 14 rebounds). With his 48 points in this game, Dončić tied with Eddie Palubinskas for the second highest points scored in a match in the history of the Olympics.

==== Japan ====
29 July 2021
13:40
v

Boxscore

Slovenia	116–81	Japan
Scoring by quarter: 29–23, 24–18, 27–23, 36–17
Pts: Dončić 25; Rebs: Tobey 11; Asts: Dončić 7		Pts: Hachimura 34; Rebs: Hachimura, Watanabe 7 Asts: Hachimura, Tanaka 3

Saitama Super Arena, Saitama
Referees: Aleksandar Glišić (SRB), Michael Weiland (CAN), Ferdinand Pascual (PHI)

In the next game, Slovenia defeated host Japan 116–81. Dončić had another good performance, scoring 25 points, 7 rebounds, and 7 assists in 26 minutes, while Zoran Dragić scored 24 points. After the game, Japan coach Julio Lamas remarked: "They played better than us, all the game. They are a very good team, very complete team with one amazing player."

==== Spain ====
1 August 2021
17:20
v

Boxscore

Spain	87–95	Slovenia
Scoring by quarter: 24–20, 20–21, 26–27, 17–27
Pts: Rubio 18; Rebs: Claver, M. Gasol 6 Asts: Rubio 9		Pts: Čančar 22; Rebs: Dončić, Tobey 14; Asts: Dončić 9

Saitama Super Arena, Saitama
Referees: Ademir Zurapović (BIH), Yohan Rosso (FRA), Matthew Kallio (CAN)

After winning their first two games in the competition, Slovenia faced Spain, the reigning world champions, and defeated them 95–87. In the game, Dončić suffered a box-and-one defense employed by Spain to curtail him. Prepelič entered the match late in the first quarter and, like Dončić, received box-and-one defense from Sergio Llull while Dončić was on the bench. Dončić was one point too short of getting triple double, scoring 14 points, 14 rebounds, and 9 assists. Tobey, who was Slovenia's top performer of the game and was named player of the day by FIBA, recorded a double-double with 16 points and 14 rebounds, while Prepelič (15 points) was the hero of the game, scoring the crucial three-pointer that put Slovenia ahead 86–85 two and a half minutes before the end. A minute and a half before the end he intercepted a ball and sent Tobey an alley-hoop which he dunked to close the game. Vlatko Čančar also scored 22 points.

The win gave Slovenia the group's top seed.

=== Knockout round ===
==== Quarterfinal – Germany ====
3 August 2021
10:00
v

Boxscore

Slovenia	94–70	Germany
Scoring by quarter: 25–14, 19–23, 22–17, 28–16
Pts: Dragić 27; Rebs: Tobey 11; Asts: Dončić 11		Pts: Lô 11; Rebs: Bonga 7 Asts: Bonga 3

Saitama Super Arena, Saitama
Referees: Ademir Zurapović (BIH), Matthew Kallio (CAN), Omar Bermúdez (MEX)

Slovenia won their quarter-final, defeating Germany 94–70. Dončić again dominated the court, but Tobey, Prepelič, Čančar and Dragić were also praised for their performances. Slovenia was somewhat imprecise in the first half. They won the first quarter but lost the second, and Germany even surpassed them 32–31, with both Dončić and Prepelič erring.

Prepelič and Dončić gave the final blow to Germany, putting an advantage of 19 points in the middle of the fourth quarter. Prepelič scored one three-pointer, then attempted two more times from behind the line and scored both times.

Dragić led all scorers with 27 points. He closed the first half with a three-pointer and opened the second with another one, while Tobey recorded another double-double with 13 points and 11 rebounds. Dončić again went near a triple double, scoring 20 points, 11 rebounds and 8 assists.

==== Semifinal – France ====
5 August 2021
20:00
v

Boxscore

France	90–89	Slovenia
Scoring by quarter: 27–29, 15–15, 29–21, 19–24
Pts: De Colo 25; Rebs: Gobert 16; Asts: De Colo 5		Pts: Tobey 23; Rebs: Dončić 10; Asts: Dončić 18

Saitama Super Arena, Saitama
Referees: Guilherme Locatelli (BRA), Juan Fernández (ARG), Mārtiņš Kozlovskis (LAT)

Slovenia lost the dramatic semi-final against France by one point, 90–89. The match seemed over for Slovenia when Jaka Blažič missed a three point jumper and Timothe Luwawu-Cabarrot made it 90–85 for the French, with less than a minute left to play. However, Prepelič, who in a few seconds managed to score four points, brought Slovenia to just one point of France. Next, Nando de Colo missed a layup and Slovenia had the match point. Dončić renounced to shoot, and turned the clutch shoot over to Prepelič, who attempted a layup but was stopped by a block by six-inch taller Nicolas Batum. After the game, Rudy Gobert stated that Batum's game-saving play was "one of the best blocks he had ever seen." Dončić scored 16 points (and also went triple double), while Tobey and Prepelič scored 23 and 17 points, respectively.

==== Bronze medal game – Australia ====
7 August 2021
20:00
v

Boxscore

Slovenia	93–107	Australia
Scoring by quarter: 19–20, 26–33, 22–25, 26–29
Pts: Dončić 22; Rebs: Dončić 8 Asts: Dončić 7		Pts: Mills 42; Rebs: Ingles 9 Asts: Mills 9

Saitama Super Arena, Saitama
Referees: Roberto Vázquez (PUR), Yohan Rosso (FRA), Matthew Kallio (CAN)

"Out of the four semi-finals, we were the only ones who played the FIBA Olympic Qualifying Tournament. We had to peak then. It's hard to have another peak in an event like this one. But we shook the world, everybody was afraid of us. I know that. Everybody was afraid of Dončić and Prepelič. We were together for two months, and I'm proud of them."

— Aleksander Sekulić, after the game against Australia.

Slovenia played the bronze medal game against Australia, which they lost 107–93 to the Boomers. Australia got off early, taking a 9–2 lead after three minutes and a half. Slovenia initially passed Australia 15–13 with a three-pointer by Prepelič. However, from a score of 17–13, Australia passed them again with a three-pointer by Chris Goulding and a jumper by Patty Mills, who scored 26 points in the first half. In the third quarter, Prepelič brought Slovenia within 60–66 with less than four minutes left in the period, converting a four-point play. He and Dončić scored again, but Mills and Joe Ingles responded, with the score now at 64–75.

Slovenia didn't give up, and a free throw and a layup by Blažič and five points from Prepelič brought them five points of the Boomers. Dončić, who finished with 22 points, 8 rebounds, and 7 assists, endeavored to bring Slovenia back into the game. Prepelič brought the score to 75–81 with a layup just before Australia's time-out. He then scored another three-pointer, and Dončić a layup, for a score of 80–83. However, Australia managed to take ten points of advantage again. Subsequently, Čančar made an offensive foul on Dante Exum, who then scored a three point jumper. Dončić scored a three-pointer, but Mills went on to reach his 40th point and Ingles scored a three-pointer. Slovenia then failed some attempts to keep the game alive, and Australia went over 100 points, eventually winning the game. Prepelič scored 18 points and 2 assists and approached a double-double with 7 rebounds. He was Slovenia's top performer of the game.

=== Statistics ===
Legend
GP	Games played	MPG	Minutes per game	PTS	Total points
FGM	Field goals made	FGA	Field goals attempted	FG%	Field goal percentage
3PM	3-point field goals made	3PA	3-point field goals attempted	3P%	3-point field goal percentage
FTM	Free throws made	FTA	Free throws attempted	FT%	Free throw percentage
RPG	Rebounds per game	APG	Assists per game	PPG	Points per game

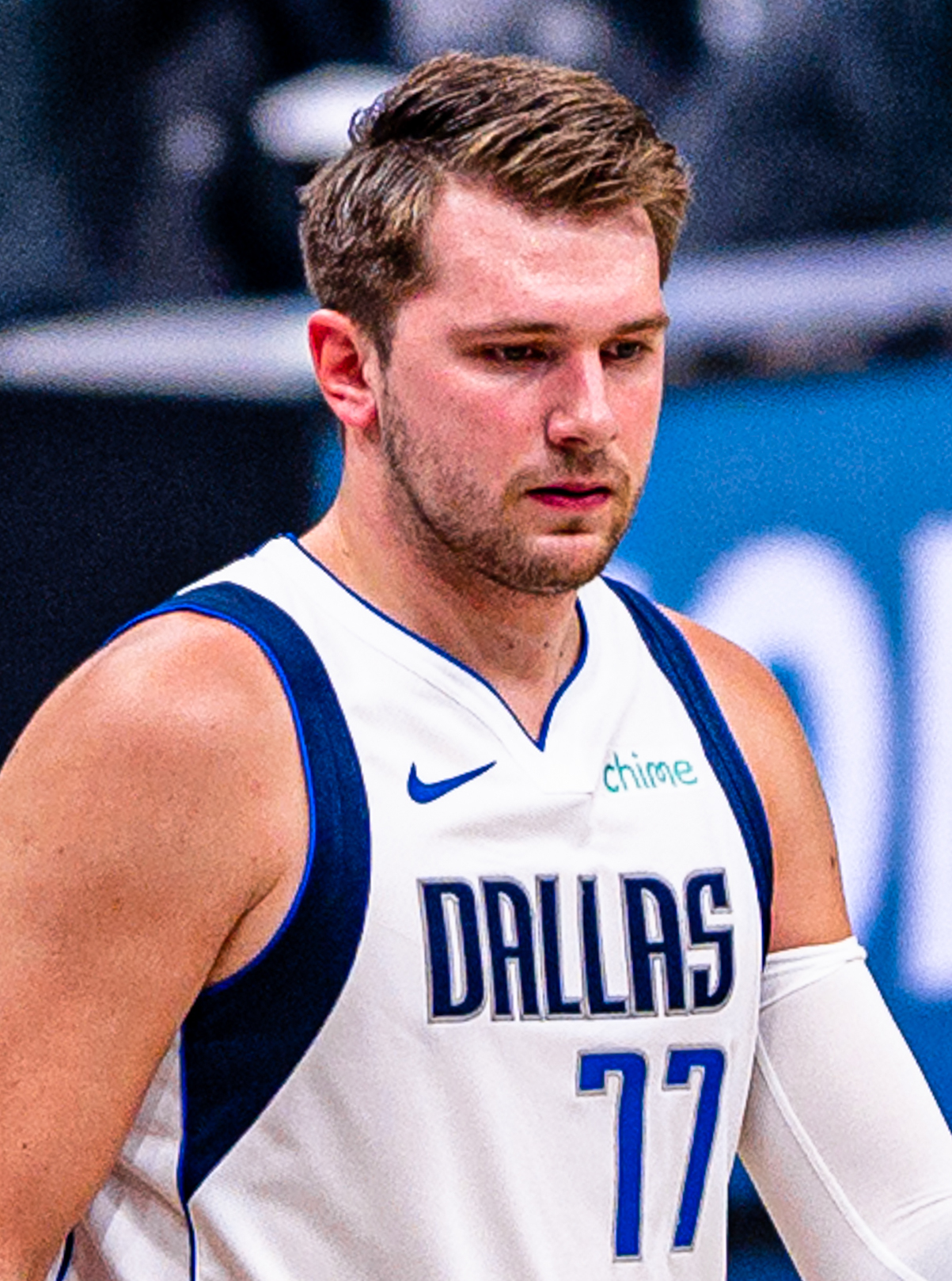
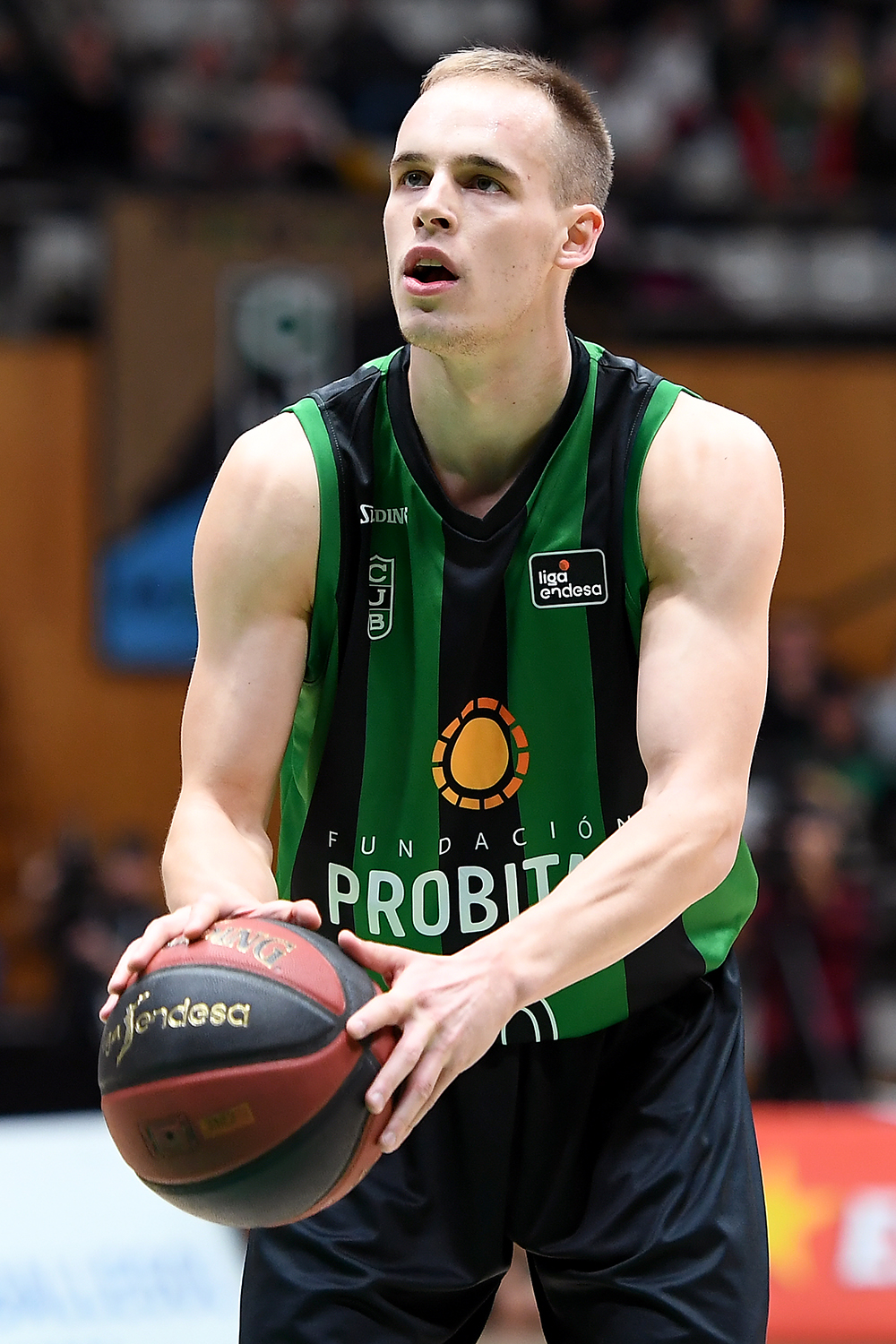
Dončić (23.8) and Prepelič (15.5), Slovenia's leading scorers at the Tokyo Olympics.

Player	GP	MPG	PTS	FGM	FGA	FG%	3PM	3PA	3P%	FTM	FTA	FT%	RPG	APG	PPG
Luka Dončić	6	32.7	143	8.0	17.8	44.9	2.8	9.3	30.4	5.0	7.0	71.4	9.7	9.5	23.8
Klemen Prepelič	6	23.1	93	4.5	10.5	42.9	2.7	6.7	40.0	3.8	4.7	82.1	3.3	2.7	15.5
Mike Tobey	6	29.1	82	5.8	9.5	61.4	0.8	2.2	38.5	1.2	1.8	63.6	10.5	2.5	13.7
Vlatko Čančar	6	28.0	77	4.3	7.5	57.8	2.0	4.2	48.0	2.2	2.3	92.9	4.3	0.8	12.8
Zoran Dragić	6	22.8	74	4.8	8.2	59.2	1.5	3.3	45.0	1.2	2.2	53.8	3.5	1.8	12.3
Jaka Blažič	6	24.7	58	3.8	10.3	37.1	1.5	5.8	25.7	0.5	0.7	75.0	3.8	1.2	9.7
Žiga Dimec	6	7.2	28	2.2	2.7	81.3	0.0	0.0	0.0	0.3	1.0	33.3	2.7	0.3	4.7
Edo Murić	6	14.6	23	1.5	3.5	42.9	0.8	2.3	35.7	0.0	0.0	0.0	2.8	1.0	3.8
Jakob Čebašek	3	2.1	6	0.7	1.0	66.7	0.7	1.0	66.7	0.0	0.0	0.0	0.3	0.0	2.0
Gregor Hrovat	4	5.4	7	0.8	1.3	60.0	0.3	0.3	100.0	0.0	0.0	0.0	1.3	0.0	1.8
Luka Rupnik	5	6.0	8	0.4	2.0	20.0	0.4	1.4	28.6	0.4	0.8	50.0	1.2	2.2	1.6
Aleksej Nikolić	6	8.0	6	0.3	1.3	25.0	0.3	1.0	33.3	0.0	0.0	0.0	0.3	1.0	1.0
