= Slovenia at the 2020 Summer Olympics =

- IOC code: SLO
- NOC: Olympic Committee of Slovenia
- Website: www.olympic.si (in Slovene and English)

in Tokyo, Japan 23 July 2021 – 8 August 2021
- Competitors: 54 in 14 sports
- Flag bearers (opening): Eva Terčelj and Bojan Tokić
- Flag bearer (closing): Janja Garnbret
- Medals Ranked 31st: Gold 3 Silver 1 Bronze 1 Total 5

Summer Olympics appearances (overview)
- 1992; 1996; 2000; 2004; 2008; 2012; 2016; 2020; 2024; 2028

Other related appearances
- Austria (1912); Yugoslavia (1920–1988)

Slovenia competed at the 2020 Summer Olympics in Tokyo. Originally scheduled to take place from 24 July to 9 August 2020, the Games were postponed to 23 July to 8 August 2021, because of the COVID-19 pandemic. This was the nation's eighth consecutive appearance at the Summer Olympics as an independent nation. Slovenian athletes won five medals, including three gold, won by canoeist Benjamin Savšek, road racing cyclist Primož Roglič, and sport climber Janja Garnbret. Three gold medals is an all-time record for Slovenia at the Summer Olympics, having previously won two gold in 2000. The Olympics saw the debut of the men's basketball team who finished fourth in the tournament.

== Medalists ==
Medal	Name	Sport	Event	Date
Gold	Benjamin Savšek	Canoeing	Men's slalom C-1	26 July
Gold	Primož Roglič	Cycling	Men's road time trial	28 July
Gold	Janja Garnbret	Sport climbing	Women's combined	6 August
Silver	Tina Trstenjak	Judo	Women's 63 kg	27 July
Bronze	Tadej Pogačar	Cycling	Men's road race	24 July

== Summary ==
In June 2021, the Olympic Committee of Slovenia officially confirmed 41 competitors who would represent the country at the Tokyo Summer Olympics. On 4 July 2021, the national men's basketball team won the Olympic Qualifying Tournaments in Kaunas, secured a spot at the Olympic tournament, and bringing the total number of athletes to 53. Eva Terčelj, a canoeist, and Bojan Tokić, a table tennis player, were chosen as the flag bearers at the opening ceremony. This was the first time in Olympic history that there were two flag bearers, a man and a woman. Slovenia sent competitors in 14 sports. Apart from the men's basketball team, the sports with five or more competitors were athletics, cycling, canoeing, and judo. Miroslav Cerar, a gymnast who won gold at the 1964 Summer Olympics in Tokyo, was chosen as the leader of the Slovenian Olympic Team.

At the 2016 Summer Olympics, Slovenian athletes won four medals, including one gold. Vasilij Žbogar, a sailor, has since retired from competing. Judokas Tina Trstenjak and Anamari Velenšek returned to the Olympic tournament, as did the canoeist Peter Kauzer. Other potential candidates included cyclists Tadej Pogačar, the incumbent Tour de France winner, and Primož Roglič, the sport climbing champion Janja Garnbret, canoeists Terčelj and Benjamin Savšek, and the discus thrower Kristjan Čeh. The basketball team, the reigning European champions led by the NBA star Luka Dončić, was seen as a team that could reach high.

The first medal event for Slovenia took place on 24 July, the men's road race in cycling. Following an early breakaway, Jan Tratnik led the chase for a long time. In the finish kilometres, Richard Carapaz and Brandon McNulty broke away from the peloton that has by then thinned out. Carapaz won the race while the chase group set themselves up for the sprint for the silver and bronze medals, resulting in an 8-way race for the finish in the final metres of the race. Pogačar won bronze, slightly behind Wout van Aert. Roglič finished 28th with over 6 minutes behind, having still not completely recovered from his fall at Tour de France.

== Competitors ==
The following is the list of number of competitors in the Games.

Sport	Men	Women	Total
Archery	1	0	1
Athletics	2	5	7
Basketball	12	0	12
Canoeing	2	4	6
Cycling	4	2	6
Golf	0	1	1
Gymnastics	0	1	1
Judo	1	4	5
Sailing	1	2	3
Shooting	0	1	1
Sport climbing	0	2	2
Swimming	1	3	4
Table tennis	4	0	4
Taekwondo	1	0	1
Total	29	25	54

== Archery ==
One Slovenian archer booked a place in the men's individual recurve by finishing in the top four at the Europe Continental Qualification Tournament in Antalya, Turkey.

Athlete	Event	Ranking round		Round of 64	Round of 32	Round of 16	Quarterfinals	Semifinals	Final / BM	
Athlete	Event	Score	Seed	Opposition Score	Opposition Score	Opposition Score	Opposition Score	Opposition Score	Opposition Score	Rank
Žiga Ravnikar	Men's individual	651	41	Nespoli (ITA); L 0–6	Did not advance					

== Athletics ==
Slovenian athletes further achieved the entry standards, either by qualifying time or by world ranking, in the following track and field events (up to a maximum of 3 athletes in each event):

Key

- Note–Ranks given for track events are within the athlete's heat only
- Q = Qualified for the next round
- q = Qualified for the next round as a fastest loser or, in field events, by position without achieving the qualifying target
- NR = National record
- N/A = Round not applicable for the event
- Bye = Athlete not required to compete in round

Track & road events

Athlete	Event	Heat		Quarterfinal		Semifinal		Final	
Athlete	Event	Result	Rank	Result	Rank	Result	Rank	Result	Rank
Luka Janežič	Men's 400 m	45.44	5 q	—N/a		45.36	7	Did not advance	
Maja Mihalinec	Women's 100 m	Bye		11.54	5	Did not advance			
Maja Mihalinec	Women's 200 m	23.62	4	—N/a		Did not advance			
Anita Horvat	Women's 400 m	52.34	6	—N/a		Did not advance			
Klara Lukan	Women's 5000 m	DNF		—N/a				Did not advance	
Maruša Mišmaš	Women's 3000 m steeplechase	9:23.36	2 Q	—N/a				9:14.84	6

Field events

Athlete	Event	Qualification		Final	
Athlete	Event	Distance	Position	Distance	Position
Kristjan Čeh	Men's discus throw	65.45	3 q	66.62	5
Tina Šutej	Women's pole vault	4.55	=1 q	4.50	=5

== Basketball ==
=== Indoor ===
Summary

Team	Event	Group stage				Quarterfinal	Semifinal	Final / BM	
Team	Event	Opposition Score	Opposition Score	Opposition Score	Rank	Opposition Score	Opposition Score	Opposition Score	Rank
Slovenia men's	Men's tournament	Argentina; W 118–100	Japan; W 116–81	Spain; W 95–87	1 Q	Germany; W 94–70	France; L 89–90	Australia; L 93–107	4

==== Men's tournament ====
Slovenia men's basketball team qualified for the Olympics by securing its lone outright berth and winning the final match over the host Lithuania at the Kaunas leg of the 2020 FIBA Olympic Qualifying Tournament, marking the nation's debut in the sport since the breakup of the SFR Yugoslavia.

Team roster

The roster was announced on 17 July 2021.

Slovenia national basketball team roster
Players
Coaches

Pos.	No.	Name	Age – Date of birth	Height	Club	Ctr.
PG	5	Luka Rupnik	28 – 20 May 1993	1.86 m (6 ft 1 in)	Cedevita Olimpija	(Slovenia)
PG	6	Aleksej Nikolić	26 – 21 February 1995	1.91 m (6 ft 3 in)	BCM Gravelines-Dunkerque	(France)
SG	7	Klemen Prepelič	28 – 20 October 1992	1.89 m (6 ft 2 in)	Valencia	(Spain)
SF	8	Edo Murić (C)	29 – 27 November 1991	2.02 m (6 ft 8 in)	Cedevita Olimpija	(Slovenia)
C	10	Mike Tobey	26 – 10 October 1994	2.13 m (7 ft 0 in)	Valencia	(Spain)
SG	11	Jaka Blažič	31 – 30 June 1990	1.96 m (6 ft 5 in)	Cedevita Olimpija	(Slovenia)
SF	15	Gregor Hrovat	26 – 18 August 1994	1.96 m (6 ft 5 in)	Cholet Basket	(France)
C	27	Žiga Dimec	28 – 20 February 1993	2.11 m (6 ft 11 in)	Cedevita Olimpija	(Slovenia)
SF	30	Zoran Dragić	32 – 22 June 1989	1.96 m (6 ft 5 in)	Baskonia	(Spain)
SF	31	Vlatko Čančar	24 – 10 April 1997	2.03 m (6 ft 8 in)	Denver Nuggets	(United States)
SF	55	Jakob Čebašek	30 – 28 April 1991	2.00 m (6 ft 7 in)	Dinamo București	(Romania)
SF	77	Luka Dončić	22 – 28 February 1999	2.01 m (6 ft 7 in)	Dallas Mavericks	(United States)

Head coach

- (Slovenia) Aleksander Sekulić

Assistant coach(es)

- (Slovenia) Dalibor Damjanović
- (Slovenia) Dragiša Drobnjak
- (Slovenia) Jernej Valentinčič

Legend

- (C) Team captain
- Age – describes age
  on 25 July 2021

Group play

Pos	Team	Pld	W	L	PF	PA	PD	Pts	Qualification
1	Slovenia	3	3	0	329	268	+61	6	Quarterfinals
2	Spain	3	2	1	256	243	+13	5	Quarterfinals
3	Argentina	3	1	2	268	276	−8	4	Quarterfinals
4	Japan (H)	3	0	3	235	301	−66	3	

Source: TOCOG and FIBA
Rules for classification: 1) classification points; 2) head-to-head results; 3) head-to-head game points difference; 4) head-to-head number of game points scored.
(H) Hosts

26 July 2021
13:40
v

Boxscore

Argentina	100–118	Slovenia
Scoring by quarter: 24–32, 18–30, 24–26, 34–30
Pts: Scola 23; Rebs: Deck 8 Asts: Vildoza 5		Pts: Dončić 48; Rebs: Tobey 14; Asts: Dončić 5

Saitama Super Arena, Saitama
Referees: Steven Anderson (USA), Yohan Rosso (FRA), Yu Jung (TPE)

29 July 2021
13:40
v

Boxscore

Slovenia	116–81	Japan
Scoring by quarter: 29–23, 24–18, 27–23, 36–17
Pts: Dončić 25; Rebs: Tobey 11; Asts: Dončić 7		Pts: Hachimura 34; Rebs: Hachimura, Watanabe 7 Asts: Hachimura, Tanaka 3

Saitama Super Arena, Saitama
Referees: Aleksandar Glišić (SRB), Michael Weiland (CAN), Ferdinand Pascual (PHI)

1 August 2021
17:20
v

Boxscore

Spain	87–95	Slovenia
Scoring by quarter: 24–20, 20–21, 26–27, 17–27
Pts: Rubio 18; Rebs: Claver, M. Gasol 6 Asts: Rubio 9		Pts: Čančar 22; Rebs: Dončić, Tobey 14; Asts: Dončić 9

Saitama Super Arena, Saitama
Referees: Ademir Zurapović (BIH), Yohan Rosso (FRA), Matthew Kallio (CAN)

Quarterfinal

3 August 2021
10:00
v

Boxscore

Slovenia	94–70	Germany
Scoring by quarter: 25–14, 19–23, 22–17, 28–16
Pts: Dragić 27; Rebs: Tobey 11; Asts: Dončić 11		Pts: Lô 11; Rebs: Bonga 7 Asts: Bonga 3

Saitama Super Arena, Saitama
Referees: Ademir Zurapović (BIH), Matthew Kallio (CAN), Omar Bermúdez (MEX)

Semifinal

5 August 2021
20:00
v

Boxscore

France	90–89	Slovenia
Scoring by quarter: 27–29, 15–15, 29–21, 19–24
Pts: De Colo 25; Rebs: Gobert 16; Asts: De Colo 5		Pts: Tobey 23; Rebs: Dončić 10; Asts: Dončić 18

Saitama Super Arena, Saitama
Referees: Guilherme Locatelli (BRA), Juan Fernández (ARG), Mārtiņš Kozlovskis (LAT)

Bronze medal game

7 August 2021
20:00
v

Boxscore

Slovenia	93–107	Australia
Scoring by quarter: 19–20, 26–33, 22–25, 26–29
Pts: Dončić 22; Rebs: Dončić 8 Asts: Dončić 7		Pts: Mills 42; Rebs: Ingles 9 Asts: Mills 9

Saitama Super Arena, Saitama
Referees: Roberto Vázquez (PUR), Yohan Rosso (FRA), Matthew Kallio (CAN)

== Canoeing ==
=== Slalom ===
Slovenian canoeists qualified one boat for each of the following classes through the 2019 ICF Canoe Slalom World Championships in La Seu d'Urgell, Spain.

Athlete	Event	Preliminary						Semifinal		Final	
Athlete	Event	Run 1	Rank	Run 2	Rank	Best	Rank	Time	Rank	Time	Rank
Benjamin Savšek	Men's C-1	98.82	1	105.87	12	98.82	2 Q	104.26	5 Q	98.25	1st place, gold medalist(s)
Peter Kauzer	Men's K-1	93.04	4	105.64	23	93.04	11 Q	99.10	12	Did not advance	
Alja Kozorog	Women's C-1	124.08	15	113.07	7	113.07	8 Q	129.72	12	Did not advance	
Eva Terčelj	Women's K-1	115.93	15	109.11	9	109.11	11 Q	112.48	24	Did not advance	

=== Sprint ===
Slovenia qualified a single boat in the women's K-2 200 m for the Games by finishing fourth overall and second among those nations eligible for Olympic qualification at the 2019 ICF Canoe Sprint World Championships in Szeged, Hungary.

Athlete	Event	Heats		Quarterfinals		Semifinals		Final	
Athlete	Event	Time	Rank	Time	Rank	Time	Rank	Time	Rank
Anja Osterman; Špela Ponomarenko Janić	Women's K-2 500 m	1:48.509	4 QF	1:46.929	1 SF	DNF		Did not advance	

Qualification Legend: FA = Qualify to final (medal); FB = Qualify to final B (non-medal)

== Cycling ==
=== Road ===
Slovenia entered a squad of five riders (four men and one woman) to compete in their respective Olympic road races, by virtue of their top 50 national finish (for men) and top 22 (for women) in the UCI World Ranking.

Athlete	Event	Time	Rank
Tadej Pogačar	Men's road race	6:06.33	3rd place, bronze medalist(s)
Jan Polanc	Men's road race	6:15:38	43
Primož Roglič	Men's road race	6:11.46	28
Primož Roglič	Men's time trial	55:04:19	1st place, gold medalist(s)
Jan Tratnik	Men's road race	6:21:46	67
Eugenia Bujak	Women's road race	3:55:13	19

=== Mountain biking ===
Slovenia entered one mountain biker to compete in the women's cross-country race by finishing in the top two of the elite division vying for qualification at the 2019 UCI Mountain Bike World Championships in Mont-Sainte-Anne, Canada.

Athlete	Event	Time	Rank
Tanja Žakelj	Women's cross-country	1:24:38	21

== Golf ==
Slovenia entered one golfer into the Olympic tournament. Pia Babnik (world no. 301) qualified directly among the top 60 eligible players for the women's event based on the IGF World Rankings.

Athlete	Event	Round 1	Round 2	Round 3	Round 4	Total		
Athlete	Event	Score	Score	Score	Score	Score	Par	Rank
Pia Babnik	Women's	71	71	73	67	282	−2	=34

== Gymnastics ==
=== Rhythmic ===
Slovenia entered one rhythmic gymnast into the Olympic competition for the first time, by receiving a spare berth freed up by host nation Japan, as the next highest-ranked athlete, not yet qualified, in the individual all-around at the 2019 World Championships in Baku, Azerbaijan.

Athlete	Event	Qualification						Final					
Athlete	Event	Hoop	Ball	Clubs	Ribbon	Total	Rank	Hoop	Ball	Clubs	Ribbon	Total	Rank
Ekaterina Vedeneeva	Individual	22.800	23.550	22.550	20.800	89.700	16	Did not advance					

== Judo ==
Slovenia qualified five judoka (one man and four women) for each of the following weight classes at the Games. All of them, highlighted by Rio 2016 Olympians Adrian Gomboc (men's half-lightweight, 66 kg) and defending champion Tina Trstenjak (women's half-middleweight, 63 kg), were selected among the top 18 judoka of their respective weight classes based on the IJF World Ranking List of June 28, 2021.

Athlete	Event	Round of 32	Round of 16	Quarterfinals	Semifinals	Repechage	Final / BM	
Athlete	Event	Opposition Result	Opposition Result	Opposition Result	Opposition Result	Opposition Result	Opposition Result	Rank
Adrian Gomboc	Men's −66 kg	Mungandu (ZAM); W 10–00	Zantaraia (UKR); W 01–00	An B-u (KOR); L 00–10	Did not advance	Shmailov (ISR); L 00–01	Did not advance	7
Maruša Štangar	Women's −48 kg	Kang Y-j (KOR); W 10–01	Pareto (ARG); L 00–10	Did not advance				
Kaja Kajzer	Women's −57 kg	Dorjsuren (MGL); W 01–00	Lien C-l (TPE); W 10–00	Gjakova (KOS); L 00–11	Bye	Nelson-Levy (ISR); W 10–00	Klimkait (CAN); L 00–01	5
Tina Trstenjak	Women's −63 kg	Han H-j (KOR); W 01–00	Cabaña (ESP); W 10–00	Barrios (VEN); W 10–01	Centracchio (ITA); W 10–00	Bye	Agbegnenou (FRA); L 00–01	2nd place, silver medalist(s)
Anamari Velenšek	Women's +78 kg	Cutro-Kelly (USA); W 11–00	Altheman (BRA); L 00–10	Did not advance				

== Sailing ==
Slovenian sailors qualified one boat in each of the following classes through the 2018 Sailing World Championships, the class-associated Worlds, and the continental regattas.

Athlete	Event	Race											Net points	Final rank
Athlete	Event	1	2	3	4	5	6	7	8	9	10	M*	Net points	Final rank
Žan Luka Zelko	Men's Laser	8	23	29	17	31	~~36~~	20	26	5	19	EL	178	26
Veronika Macarol; Tina Mrak	Women's 470	8	~~16~~	6	9	4	7	3	9	2	7	14	69	5

M = Medal race; EL = Eliminated – did not advance into the medal race

== Shooting ==
Slovenia granted an invitation from ISSF to send two-time Olympian Živa Dvoršak (women's 50 m rifle 3 positions) to the rescheduled Games as the highest-ranked shooter vying for qualification in the ISSF World Olympic Rankings of 6 June 2021.

Athlete	Event	Qualification		Final	
Athlete	Event	Points	Rank	Points	Rank
Živa Dvoršak	Women's 10 m air rifle	627.2	11	Did not advance	
Živa Dvoršak	Women's 50 m rifle 3 positions	1173	7 Q	406.2	7

== Sport climbing ==
Slovenia entered two sport climbers into the Olympic tournament. Janja Garnbret qualified directly for the women's combined event, by winning the gold medal and securing one of the seven provisional berths at the 2019 IFSC World Championships in Hachioji, Japan. Meanwhile, Mia Krampl finished in the top six of those eligible for qualification at the IFSC World Qualifying Event in Toulouse, France, earning a quota place and joining with Gambret on the Slovenian roster.

Athlete	Event	Qualification									Final								
Athlete	Event	Speed		Boulder		Lead			Total	Rank	Speed		Boulder		Lead			Total	Rank
Athlete	Event	Best	Place	Result	Place	Hold	Time	Place	Total	Rank	Best	Place	Result	Place	Hold	Time	Place	Total	Rank
Janja Garnbret	Women's	9.44	14	4T4z 4 4	1	30	—	4	56.00	4 Q	7.81	5	2T3z 5 3	1	37+	—	1	5	1st place, gold medalist(s)
Mia Krampl	Women's	10.43	18	0T4z 0 5	14	26+	3:16	7	1764.00	18	Did not advance								

== Swimming ==
Slovenian swimmers further achieved qualifying standards in the following events (up to a maximum of 2 swimmers in each event at the Olympic Qualifying Time (OQT), and potentially 1 at the Olympic Selection Time (OST)):

Athlete	Event	Heat		Semifinal		Final	
Athlete	Event	Result	Rank	Result	Rank	Result	Rank
Martin Bau	Men's 400 m freestyle	3:52.56	24	—N/a		Did not advance	
Martin Bau	Men's 800 m freestyle	8:04.79	32	—N/a		Did not advance	
Katja Fain	Women's 800 m freestyle	8:41.13	26	—N/a		Did not advance	
Katja Fain	Women's 1500 m freestyle	16:35.92	30	—N/a		Did not advance	
Katja Fain	Women's 400 m individual medley	4:44.66	15	—N/a		Did not advance	
Špela Perše	Women's 10 km open water	—N/a				2:08:33.0	24
Janja Šegel	Women's 100 m freestyle	54.73	24	Did not advance			
Janja Šegel	Women's 200 m freestyle	1:58.38	17	Did not advance			

== Table tennis ==
Slovenia entered three athletes into the table tennis competition at the Games. For the first time in history, the men's team secured a berth by advancing to the quarterfinal round of the 2020 World Olympic Qualification Event in Gondomar, Portugal, permitting a maximum of two starters to compete in the men's singles tournament.

Athlete	Event	Preliminary	Round 1	Round 2	Round 3	Round of 16	Quarterfinals	Semifinals	Final / BM	
Athlete	Event	Opposition Result	Opposition Result	Opposition Result	Opposition Result	Opposition Result	Opposition Result	Opposition Result	Opposition Result	Rank
Darko Jorgić	Men's singles	Bye		Robles (ESP); W 4–3	Pitchford (GBR); W 4–2	Harimoto (JPN); W 4–3	Lin Y-j (TPE); L 0–4	Did not advance		
Bojan Tokić	Men's singles	Bye	Hazin (CAN); W 4–0	Pucar (CRO); W 4–0	Calderano (BRA); L 1–4	Did not advance				
Darko Jorgić; Deni Kozul; Bojan Tokić	Men's team	—N/a				South Korea; L 1–3	Did not advance			

== Taekwondo ==
Slovenia entered one athlete into the taekwondo competition at the Games for the first time since London 2012. Ivan Trajkovič qualified directly for the men's heavyweight category (+80 kg) by finishing among the top five taekwondo practitioners at the end of the WT Olympic Rankings.

Athlete	Event	Round of 16	Quarterfinals	Semifinals	Repechage	Final / BM	
Athlete	Event	Opposition Result	Opposition Result	Opposition Result	Opposition Result	Opposition Result	Rank
Ivan Trajkovič	Men's +80 kg	Obame (GAB); W 26–5 PTG	Larin (ROC); L 3–16	Did not advance	Taufatofua (TGA); W 22–1 PTG	In K-d (KOR); L 4–5	5
