= Basketball at the 2020 Summer Olympics – Men's tournament =

Tournament details
- Host country: Japan
- Dates: 25 July – 7 August 2021
- Teams: 12 (from 5 confederations)
- Venue: Saitama Super Arena

Final positions
- Champions: United States (16th title)
- Runners-up: France
- Third place: Australia
- Fourth place: Slovenia

Tournament statistics
- Games played: 26
- Attendance: 0 (0 per game)
- MVP: (United States) Kevin Durant
- Top scorer: (Spain) Ricky Rubio (25.5 points per game)

The men's basketball tournament at the 2020 Summer Olympics was the 20th edition of the event for men at the Summer Olympic Games. It was held from 25 July to 7 August 2021. All games were played at the Saitama Super Arena in Saitama, Japan.

It was originally scheduled to be held in 2020, but on 24 March 2020, the Olympics were postponed to 2021 due to the COVID-19 pandemic. Because of this pandemic, the games were played behind closed doors.

The United States won their 16th overall and fourth consecutive gold medal, after defeating France in the final. Australia won the bronze with a 107–93 win over Slovenia, winning its first medal in men's basketball after a series of losses in bronze medal games.

The medals for the competition were presented by IOC vice-president Anita DeFrantz and the medalists' bouquets by FIBA first vice-president Sheikh Saud Ali Al-Thani.

With a FIBA World Cup Changed a format & A Champions in FIBA World Cup will no longer be automatically qualify to the Olympics 11 Teams will battle for the Olympics through The 2019 FIBA World Cup along with 2 best teams in America & Europe, best teams in Asia, Africa and Oceania & 4 winners of 2020 FIBA Olympics Qualifying Tournament in different places alongside a host country Japan who automatically qualify to the Olympics as host & for the first time since 1996 that the slots are using 11 for qualify to the Olympics and the format will also change from 6 teams in each group (Group A & B) to 4 team in each group (Group A, B and C) The Top 2 teams in each group along with the 2 best 3rd place in their different group will advance to the knockout round.

== Format ==
The twelve teams were split into three groups of four teams, and a single round-robin was held within each group. The first- and second-placed teams of each group advanced to the quarterfinals as well as the two best third-placed teams. After the preliminary round, the teams were grouped according to their results (top four and bottom four), and a draw paired teams between the groups for the quarterfinals. From there on a knockout system was used.

== Schedule ==
The schedule of the tournament was as follows.

Legend
G	Group stage	¼	Quarter-finals	½	Semi-finals	B	Bronze medal match	F	Gold medal match

Sun 25	Mon 26	Tue 27	Wed 28	Thu 29	Fri 30	Sat 31	Sun 1	Mon 2	Tue 3	Wed 4	Thu 5	Fri 6	Sat 7	
G	G		G	G		G	G		¼		½		F	B

== Qualified teams ==
Means of qualification		Date	Venue	Berths	Qualified
Host nation		—	—	1	Japan
2019 FIBA Basketball World Cup	Africa	31 August – 15 September 2019	China	1	Nigeria
2019 FIBA Basketball World Cup	Americas	31 August – 15 September 2019	China	2	Argentina
2019 FIBA Basketball World Cup	Americas	31 August – 15 September 2019	China	2	United States
2019 FIBA Basketball World Cup	Asia	31 August – 15 September 2019	China	1	Iran
2019 FIBA Basketball World Cup	Europe	31 August – 15 September 2019	China	2	France
2019 FIBA Basketball World Cup	Europe	31 August – 15 September 2019	China	2	Spain
2019 FIBA Basketball World Cup	Oceania	31 August – 15 September 2019	China	1	Australia
2020 FIBA Men's Olympic Qualifying Tournaments		29 June – 4 July 2021	(Canada) Victoria	1	Czech Republic
2020 FIBA Men's Olympic Qualifying Tournaments		29 June – 4 July 2021	(Croatia) Split	1	Germany
2020 FIBA Men's Olympic Qualifying Tournaments		29 June – 4 July 2021	(Lithuania) Kaunas	1	Slovenia
2020 FIBA Men's Olympic Qualifying Tournaments		29 June – 4 July 2021	(Serbia) Belgrade	1	Italy
Total				12	

== Draw ==
The draw was held on 2 February 2021.

The 12 teams were divided into four pots of three teams based on their FIBA World Ranking. The three groups were formed by drawing one team from each pot. Two teams from the same continent could not be placed into the same group, with the exception of European teams, where up to two teams could be in the same group.

Due to scheduling requests from the International Olympic Committee, defending champions the United States were drawn into either Group A or B, and hosts Japan were automatically allocated Group C.

=== Seeding ===
As the four winners of the 2020 FIBA Men's Olympic Qualifying Tournaments (OQTs) were yet to be decided at the time of the draw, they were assigned placeholders of "OQT Belgrade", "OQT Kaunas", "OQT Split" and "OQT Victoria." Each of the four placeholders were seeded based on the highest-ranked team in each tournament.

Pot 1	Pot 2	Pot 3	Pot 4
United States; Spain; Australia	Argentina; Italy (Note: OQT Belgrade winners, team not determined at time of draw.); France	Czech Republic (Note: OQT Victoria winners, team not determined at time of draw.); Slovenia (Note: OQT Kaunas winners, team not determined at time of draw.); Germany (Note: OQT Split winners, team not determined at time of draw.)	Nigeria; Iran; Japan

== Referees ==
The following 30 referees were selected for the tournament.

- (Argentina) Juan Fernández
- (Argentina) Leandro Lezcano
- (Australia) Scott Beker
- (Australia) James Boyer
- (Bosnia and Herzegovina) Ademir Zurapović
- (Brazil) Guilherme Locatelli
- (Brazil) Andreia Silva
- (Canada) Matthew Kallio
- (Canada) Maripier Malo
- (Canada) Michael Weiland
- (Chinese Taipei) Yu Jung
- (Denmark) Maj Forsberg
- (France) Yohan Rosso
- (Iraq) Ahmed Al-Shuwaili
- (Italy) Manuel Mazzoni
- (Japan) Takaki Kato
- (Kazakhstan) Yevgeniy Mikheyev
- (Latvia) Mārtiņš Kozlovskis
- (Lebanon) Rabah Noujaim
- (Morocco) Samir Abaakil
- (Nigeria) Kingsley Ojeaburu
- (Norway) Gizella Györgyi
- (Philippines) Ferdinand Pascual
- (Puerto Rico) Luis Vázquez
- (Serbia) Aleksandar Glišić
- (Spain) Luis Castillo
- (Spain) Antonio Conde
- (Turkey) Yener Yılmaz
- (United States) Amy Bonner
- (United States) Steven Anderson

== Preliminary round ==
All times are local (UTC+9).

In the preliminary round, teams received 2 classification points for a win, 1 classification point for a loss, and 0 classification points for a forfeit.

=== Group A ===
Pos	Team	Pld	W	L	PF	PA	PD	Pts	Qualification
1	France	3	3	0	259	215	+44	6	Quarterfinals
2	United States	3	2	1	315	233	+82	5	Quarterfinals
3	Czech Republic	3	1	2	245	294	−49	4	
4	Iran	3	0	3	206	283	−77	3	

Source: TOCOG and FIBA
Rules for classification: 1) classification points; 2) head-to-head results; 3) head-to-head game points difference; 4) head-to-head number of game points scored.

25 July 2021
10:00
v

Boxscore

Iran	78–84	Czech Republic
Scoring by quarter: 19–25, 11–21, 16–21, 32–17
Pts: Yakhchali 23; Rebs: Haddadi 10; Asts: Jamshidi 7		Pts: Auda 16; Rebs: Balvín, Satoranský 8 Asts: Satoranský 8

Saitama Super Arena, Saitama
Referees: Matthew Kallio (CAN), Scott Beker (AUS), Yener Yılmaz (TUR)

25 July 2021
21:00
v

Boxscore

France	83–76	United States
Scoring by quarter: 15–22, 22–23, 25–11, 21–20
Pts: Fournier 28; Rebs: Gobert 9 Asts: Batum, De Colo 5		Pts: Holiday 18; Rebs: Adebayo 10; Asts: Green, Holiday 4

Saitama Super Arena, Saitama
Referees: Guilherme Locatelli (BRA), Michael Weiland (CAN), Manuel Mazzoni (ITA)

28 July 2021
13:40
v

Boxscore

United States	120–66	Iran
Scoring by quarter: 28–12, 32–18, 22–13, 38–23
Pts: Lillard 21; Rebs: Booker, Durant 5 Asts: LaVine 8		Pts: Haddadi, Jamshidi 14; Rebs: Haddadi 7 Asts: Jalalpoor, Jamshidi 3

Saitama Super Arena, Saitama
Referees: Antonio Conde (ESP), Yohan Rosso (FRA), Andreia Silva (BRA)

28 July 2021
21:00
v

Boxscore

Czech Republic	77–97	France
Scoring by quarter: 28–22, 12–29, 16–26, 21–20
Pts: Veselý 19; Rebs: Balvín 8 Asts: Satoranský 9		Pts: Fournier 21; Rebs: Gobert 10; Asts: De Colo 8

Saitama Super Arena, Saitama
Referees: Juan Fernández (ARG), Manuel Mazzoni (ITA), Leandro Lezcano (ARG)

31 July 2021
10:00
v

Boxscore

Iran	62–79	France
Scoring by quarter: 17–22, 10–24, 20–16, 15–17
Pts: Haddadi 18; Rebs: Haddadi 12; Asts: Haddadi 5		Pts: Heurtel 16; Rebs: four players 5 Asts: De Colo 5

Saitama Super Arena, Saitama
Referees: Guilherme Locatelli (BRA), Leandro Lezcano (ARG), Rabah Noujaim (LIB)

31 July 2021
21:00
v

Boxscore

United States	119–84	Czech Republic
Scoring by quarter: 18–25, 29–18, 35–17, 37–24
Pts: Tatum 27; Rebs: Durant 8 Asts: Durant 6		Pts: Schilb 17; Rebs: Satoranský 6 Asts: Satoranský 8

Saitama Super Arena, Saitama
Referees: Aleksandar Glišić (SRB), Manuel Mazzoni (ITA), Maripier Malo (CAN)

=== Group B ===
Pos	Team	Pld	W	L	PF	PA	PD	Pts	Qualification
1	Australia	3	3	0	259	226	+33	6	Quarterfinals
2	Italy	3	2	1	255	239	+16	5	Quarterfinals
3	Germany	3	1	2	257	273	−16	4	Quarterfinals
4	Nigeria	3	0	3	230	263	−33	3	

Source: TOCOG and FIBA
Rules for classification: 1) classification points; 2) head-to-head results; 3) head-to-head game points difference; 4) head-to-head number of game points scored.

25 July 2021
13:40
v

Boxscore

Germany	82–92	Italy
Scoring by quarter: 32–22, 14–21, 26–25, 10–24
Pts: Lô 24; Rebs: Voigtmann 6 Asts: three players 4		Pts: Fontecchio 20; Rebs: Melli 9 Asts: Mannion 7

Saitama Super Arena, Saitama
Referees: Antonio Conde (ESP), Ahmed Al-Shuwaili (IRQ), Yevgeniy Mikheyev (KAZ)

25 July 2021
17:20
v

Boxscore

Australia	84–67	Nigeria
Scoring by quarter: 23–23, 20–17, 15–12, 26–15
Pts: Mills 25; Rebs: Kay 8 Asts: Mills 6		Pts: Emegano 12; Rebs: Achiuwa 6 Asts: Agada, Okogie 3

Saitama Super Arena, Saitama
Referees: Ademir Zurapović (BIH), Luis Castillo (ESP), Takaki Kato (JPN)

28 July 2021
10:00
v

Boxscore

Nigeria	92–99	Germany
Scoring by quarter: 21–24, 29–26, 24–24, 18–25
Pts: Nwora 33; Rebs: Nwora 7 Asts: Emegano 6		Pts: Voigtmann 19; Rebs: Thiemann 10; Asts: Lô 9

Saitama Super Arena, Saitama
Referees: Omar Bermúdez (MEX), Mārtiņš Kozlovskis (LAT), Rabah Noujaim (LIB)

28 July 2021
17:20
v

Boxscore

Italy	83–86	Australia
Scoring by quarter: 25–25, 20–19, 17–21, 21–21
Pts: Fontecchio 22; Rebs: Polonara 7 Asts: Mannion 7		Pts: Landale 18; Rebs: three players 7 Asts: Ingles, Mills 5

Saitama Super Arena, Saitama
Referees: Michael Weiland (CAN), Steven Anderson (USA), Ahmed Al-Shuwaili (IRQ)

31 July 2021
13:40
v

Boxscore

Italy	80–71	Nigeria
Scoring by quarter: 29–17, 11–22, 16–24, 24–8
Pts: Melli 15; Rebs: Vitali 6 Asts: Fontecchio, Pajola 4		Pts: Metu 22; Rebs: Metu 10; Asts: Metu 3

Saitama Super Arena, Saitama
Referees: Antonio Conde (ESP), Roberto Vázquez (PUR), Takaki Kato (JPN)

31 July 2021
17:20
v

Boxscore

Australia	89–76	Germany
Scoring by quarter: 18–22, 26–18, 22–19, 23–17
Pts: Mills 24; Rebs: Ingles 5 Asts: Mills 6		Pts: Obst 17; Rebs: Voigtmann 13; Asts: Lô 5

Saitama Super Arena, Saitama
Referees: Juan Fernández (ARG), Steven Anderson (USA), Omar Bermúdez (MEX)

=== Group C ===
Pos	Team	Pld	W	L	PF	PA	PD	Pts	Qualification
1	Slovenia	3	3	0	329	268	+61	6	Quarterfinals
2	Spain	3	2	1	256	243	+13	5	Quarterfinals
3	Argentina	3	1	2	268	276	−8	4	Quarterfinals
4	Japan (H)	3	0	3	235	301	−66	3	

Source: TOCOG and FIBA
Rules for classification: 1) classification points; 2) head-to-head results; 3) head-to-head game points difference; 4) head-to-head number of game points scored.
(H) Hosts

26 July 2021
13:40
v

Boxscore

Argentina	100–118	Slovenia
Scoring by quarter: 24–32, 18–30, 24–26, 34–30
Pts: Scola 23; Rebs: Deck 8 Asts: Vildoza 5		Pts: Dončić 48; Rebs: Tobey 14; Asts: Dončić 5

Saitama Super Arena, Saitama
Referees: Steven Anderson (USA), Yohan Rosso (FRA), Yu Jung (TPE)

26 July 2021
21:00
v

Boxscore

Japan	77–88	Spain
Scoring by quarter: 14–18, 14–30, 28–21, 21–19
Pts: Hachimura 20; Rebs: Watanabe 8 Asts: Baba, Tanaka 5		Pts: Rubio 20; Rebs: Claver 9 Asts: Rubio 9

Saitama Super Arena, Saitama
Referees: Aleksandar Glišić (SRB), Mārtiņš Kozlovskis (LAT), Rabah Noujaim (LIB)

29 July 2021
13:40
v

Boxscore

Slovenia	116–81	Japan
Scoring by quarter: 29–23, 24–18, 27–23, 36–17
Pts: Dončić 25; Rebs: Tobey 11; Asts: Dončić 7		Pts: Hachimura 34; Rebs: Hachimura, Watanabe 7 Asts: Hachimura, Tanaka 3

Saitama Super Arena, Saitama
Referees: Aleksandar Glišić (SRB), Michael Weiland (CAN), Ferdinand Pascual (PHI)

29 July 2021
21:00
v

Boxscore

Spain	81–71	Argentina
Scoring by quarter: 20–25, 20–9, 21–19, 20–18
Pts: Rubio 26; Rebs: P. Gasol 8 Asts: M. Gasol 5		Pts: Laprovittola 27; Rebs: Deck 8 Asts: Laprovittola 4

Saitama Super Arena, Saitama
Referees: Yohan Rosso (FRA), Maj Forsberg (DEN), Guilherme Locatelli (BRA)

1 August 2021
13:40
v

Boxscore

Argentina	97–77	Japan
Scoring by quarter: 26–16, 20–22, 19–15, 32–24
Pts: Scola 23; Rebs: Scola 10; Asts: Campazzo 11		Pts: Baba 18; Rebs: Hachimura 11; Asts: three players 3

Saitama Super Arena, Saitama
Referees: Roberto Vázquez (PUR), Mārtiņš Kozlovskis (LAT), Michael Weiland (CAN)

1 August 2021
17:20
v

Boxscore

Spain	87–95	Slovenia
Scoring by quarter: 24–20, 20–21, 26–27, 17–27
Pts: Rubio 18; Rebs: Claver, M. Gasol 6 Asts: Rubio 9		Pts: Čančar 22; Rebs: Dončić, Tobey 14; Asts: Dončić 9

Saitama Super Arena, Saitama
Referees: Ademir Zurapović (BIH), Yohan Rosso (FRA), Matthew Kallio (CAN)

=== Third-placed teams ranking ===
Pos	Grp	Team	Pld	W	L	PF	PA	PD	Pts	Qualification
1	C	Argentina	3	1	2	268	276	−8	4	Quarterfinals
2	B	Germany	3	1	2	257	273	−16	4	Quarterfinals
3	A	Czech Republic	3	1	2	245	294	−49	4	

Source: TOCOG and FIBA
Rules for classification: 1) classification points; 2) game points difference; 3) number of game points scored; 4) FIBA ranking.

== Knockout stage ==
A draw after the preliminary round decided the pairings, where a seeded team played an unseeded team. The draw was held after the last group stage match on 1 August. Teams qualified were divided into two pots:

- Pot D comprised the three first-placed teams from the group phase, along with the best second-placed team.
- Pot E comprised the two remaining second-placed teams, along with the two best third-placed teams.

Draw principles:

- Each game pairing had one team from Pot D and one team from Pot E.
- Teams from the same group could not be drawn against each other in the quarterfinals.
- The second-placed team from Pot D could not be drawn against a third-placed team from Pot E.

=== Ranking ===
Pos	Team	Pld	W	L	PF	PA	PD	Pts	Qualification
1	Slovenia	3	3	0	329	268	+61	6	Seeded (Pot D)
2	France	3	3	0	259	215	+44	6	Seeded (Pot D)
3	Australia	3	3	0	259	226	+33	6	Seeded (Pot D)
4	United States	3	2	1	315	233	+82	5	Seeded (Pot D)
5	Italy	3	2	1	255	239	+16	5	Unseeded (Pot E)
6	Spain	3	2	1	256	243	+13	5	Unseeded (Pot E)
7	Argentina	3	1	2	268	276	−8	4	Unseeded (Pot E)
8	Germany	3	1	2	257	273	−16	4	Unseeded (Pot E)

Source: TOCOG
Rules for classification: 1) points; 2) points difference; 3) points scored.

=== Bracket ===
Quarterfinals
3 August
Italy	75
France	84
3 August
Slovenia	94
Germany	70
3 August
Spain	81
United States	95
3 August
Australia	97
Argentina	59

Semifinals
5 August
France	90
Slovenia	89
5 August
United States	97
Australia	78

Gold medal
7 August
France	82
United States	87
Bronze medal
7 August
Slovenia	93
Australia	107

=== Quarterfinals ===
3 August 2021
10:00
v

Boxscore

Slovenia	94–70	Germany
Scoring by quarter: 25–14, 19–23, 22–17, 28–16
Pts: Dragić 27; Rebs: Tobey 11; Asts: Dončić 11		Pts: Lô 11; Rebs: Bonga 7 Asts: Bonga 3

Saitama Super Arena, Saitama
Referees: Ademir Zurapović (BIH), Matthew Kallio (CAN), Omar Bermúdez (MEX)

3 August 2021
13:40
v

Boxscore

Spain	81–95	United States
Scoring by quarter: 21–19, 22–24, 20–26, 18–26
Pts: Rubio 38; Rebs: W. Hernangómez 10; Asts: W. Hernangómez 3		Pts: Durant 29; Rebs: Booker 9 Asts: Booker, Holiday 5

Saitama Super Arena, Saitama
Referees: Guilherme Locatelli (BRA), Yohan Rosso (FRA), Michael Weiland (CAN)

3 August 2021
17:20
v

Boxscore

Italy	75–84	France
Scoring by quarter: 25–20, 17–23, 12–21, 21–20
Pts: Fontecchio 23; Rebs: Gallinari 10; Asts: Pajola 6		Pts: Gobert 22; Rebs: Batum 14; Asts: De Colo 7

Saitama Super Arena, Saitama
Referees: Roberto Vázquez (PUR), Juan Fernández (ARG), Steven Anderson (USA)

3 August 2021
21:00
v

Boxscore

Australia	97–59	Argentina
Scoring by quarter: 18–22, 21–11, 21–15, 37–11
Pts: Mills 18; Rebs: Kay 10; Asts: Ingles 7		Pts: Laprovíttola 16; Rebs: Deck 10; Asts: Campazzo 5

Saitama Super Arena, Saitama
Referees: Antonio Conde (ESP), Aleksandar Glišić (SRB), Mārtiņš Kozlovskis (LAT)

=== Semifinals ===
5 August 2021
13:15
v

Boxscore

United States	97–78	Australia
Scoring by quarter: 18–24, 24–21, 32–10, 23–23
Pts: Durant 23; Rebs: Durant 9 Asts: Holiday 8		Pts: Mills 15; Rebs: Landale 6 Asts: Mills 8

Saitama Super Arena, Saitama
Referees: Ademir Zurapović (BIH), Michael Weiland (CAN), Manuel Mazzoni (ITA)

5 August 2021
20:00
v

Boxscore

France	90–89	Slovenia
Scoring by quarter: 27–29, 15–15, 29–21, 19–24
Pts: De Colo 25; Rebs: Gobert 16; Asts: De Colo 5		Pts: Tobey 23; Rebs: Dončić 10; Asts: Dončić 18

Saitama Super Arena, Saitama
Referees: Guilherme Locatelli (BRA), Juan Fernández (ARG), Mārtiņš Kozlovskis (LAT)

=== Bronze medal game ===
7 August 2021
20:00
v

Boxscore

Slovenia	93–107	Australia
Scoring by quarter: 19–20, 26–33, 22–25, 26–29
Pts: Dončić 22; Rebs: Dončić 8 Asts: Dončić 7		Pts: Mills 42; Rebs: Ingles 9 Asts: Mills 9

Saitama Super Arena, Saitama
Referees: Roberto Vázquez (PUR), Yohan Rosso (FRA), Matthew Kallio (CAN)

=== Gold medal game ===
7 August 2021
11:30
v

Boxscore

France	82–87	United States
Scoring by quarter: 18–22, 21–22, 24–27, 19–16
Pts: Fournier, Gobert 16; Rebs: Gobert 8 Asts: de Colo 7		Pts: Durant 29; Rebs: Tatum 7 Asts: Green 5

Saitama Super Arena, Saitama
Referees: Guilherme Locatelli (BRA), Ademir Zurapović (BIH), Michael Weiland (CAN)

Team details

France	United States

SF	5	Nicolas Batum
PF	7	Guerschon Yabusele
SG	10	Evan Fournier
SG	12	Nando de Colo
C	27	Rudy Gobert
PG	1	Frank Ntilikina
G	3	Timothé Luwawu-Cabarrot
PG	4	Thomas Heurtel
C	17	Vincent Poirier
Head Coach:
(France) Vincent Collet

G	6	Damian Lillard
F	7	Kevin Durant
C	13	Bam Adebayo
G	12	Jrue Holiday
G	15	Devin Booker
G	5	Zach LaVine
F	10	Jayson Tatum
F	14	Draymond Green
F	8	Khris Middleton
Head Coach:
(United States) Gregg Popovich

== Statistics and awards ==
=== Statistical leaders ===
==== Players ====
Points

Player	PPG
(Spain) Ricky Rubio	25.5
(Slovenia) Luka Dončić	23.8
(Australia) Patty Mills	23.3
(Japan) Rui Hachimura	22.3
(Nigeria) Jordan Nwora	21.0

Rebounds

Player	RPG
(Slovenia) Mike Tobey	10.5
(Iran) Hamed Haddadi	9.7
(Slovenia) Luka Dončić	9.7
(France) Rudy Gobert	9.3
(Germany) Johannes Voigtmann	8.0
(Japan) Yuta Watanabe	8.0

Assists

Player	APG
(Slovenia) Luka Dončić	9.5
(Czech Republic) Tomáš Satoranský	8.7
(Australia) Patty Mills	6.3
(France) Nando de Colo	6.2
(Spain) Ricky Rubio	6.0

Blocks

Player	BPG
(Iran) Hamed Haddadi	1.7
(Czech Republic) Ondřej Balvín	1.3
(Japan) Makoto Hiejima	1.3
(Nigeria) Precious Achiuwa	1.3
(United States) Bam Adebayo	1.2
(United States) Kevin Durant	1.2
(United States) Jayson Tatum	1.2

Steals

Player	SPG
(Australia) Matisse Thybulle	3.0
(Czech Republic) Jan Veselý	2.3
(Italy) Alessandro Pajola	2.0
(Czech Republic) Tomáš Satoranský	2.0
(Iran) Arsalan Kazemi	2.0
(Nigeria) Chimezie Metu	2.0

Efficiency

Player	EFFPG
(Slovenia) Luka Dončić	29.2
(Spain) Ricky Rubio	24.0
(United States) Kevin Durant	24.0
(Slovenia) Mike Tobey	21.3
(Australia) Patty Mills	20.5

==== Teams ====
Points

Team	PPG
Slovenia	100.8
United States	99.0
Australia	90.2
France	85.8
Spain	84.3

Rebounds

Team	RPG
Slovenia	47.2
France	43.0
Spain	38.8
Argentina	37.3
Australia	36.8
United States	36.8

Assists

Team	APG
Australia	24.7
United States	24.3
Czech Republic	23.3
Slovenia	22.7
France	22.0

Blocks

Team	BPG
United States	5.2
Nigeria	4.7
Japan	4.0
Spain	3.5
Italy	3.0

Steals

Team	SPG
Nigeria	11.0
United States	9.8
Czech Republic	9.7
Australia	9.7
Italy	8.5

Efficiency

Team	EFFPG
United States	121.7
Slovenia	118.7
Australia	106.5
France	102.5
Spain	95.8

=== Awards ===
The awards were announced on 8 August 2021.

FIBA All-Star Five
Guards	Forwards	Center
(Australia) Patty Mills (Spain) Ricky Rubio	(Slovenia) Luka Dončić (United States) Kevin Durant	(France) Rudy Gobert
MVP: (United States) Kevin Durant

2020 Olympic Basketball champions

United States
Sixteenth title

== Final ranking ==
Rankings were determined by:

- 1st–4th:
  - Results of gold and bronze medal games
- 5th–8th:
  - Win–loss record of the teams eliminated in the quarterfinals
- 9th–12th:
  - Teams eliminated in the preliminary round groups were classified 9th–12th based on the win–loss record in the preliminary round group.

Rank	Team	Pld	W	L	PF	PA	PD	Standing	New rank
1st place, gold medalist(s)	United States	6	5	1	594	474	+120		1
2nd place, silver medalist(s)	France	6	5	1	515	466	+49		5 (▲2)
3rd place, bronze medalist(s)	Australia	6	5	1	541	475	+66		3
4th	Slovenia	6	4	2	605	535	+70		4 (▲12)
Eliminated at the quarterfinals
5th	Italy	4	2	2	330	323	+7	B–2nd	8 (▲2)
6th	Spain	4	2	2	337	338	−1	C–2nd	2
7th	Argentina	4	1	3	327	373	−46	C–3rd	7 (▼3)
8th	Germany	4	1	3	327	367	−40	B–3rd	11 (▲6)
Eliminated in the preliminary round
9th	Czech Republic	3	1	2	245	294	−49	A–3rd	12
10th	Nigeria	3	0	3	230	263	−33	B–4th	23 (▼1)
11th	Japan	3	0	3	235	301	–66	C–4th	35 (▲7)
12th	Iran	3	0	3	206	283	−77	A–4th	22 (▲1)

== See also ==
- Basketball at the 2020 Summer Olympics – Women's tournament
