= Mike Tobey =

American-Slovenian professional basketball player (born 1994)

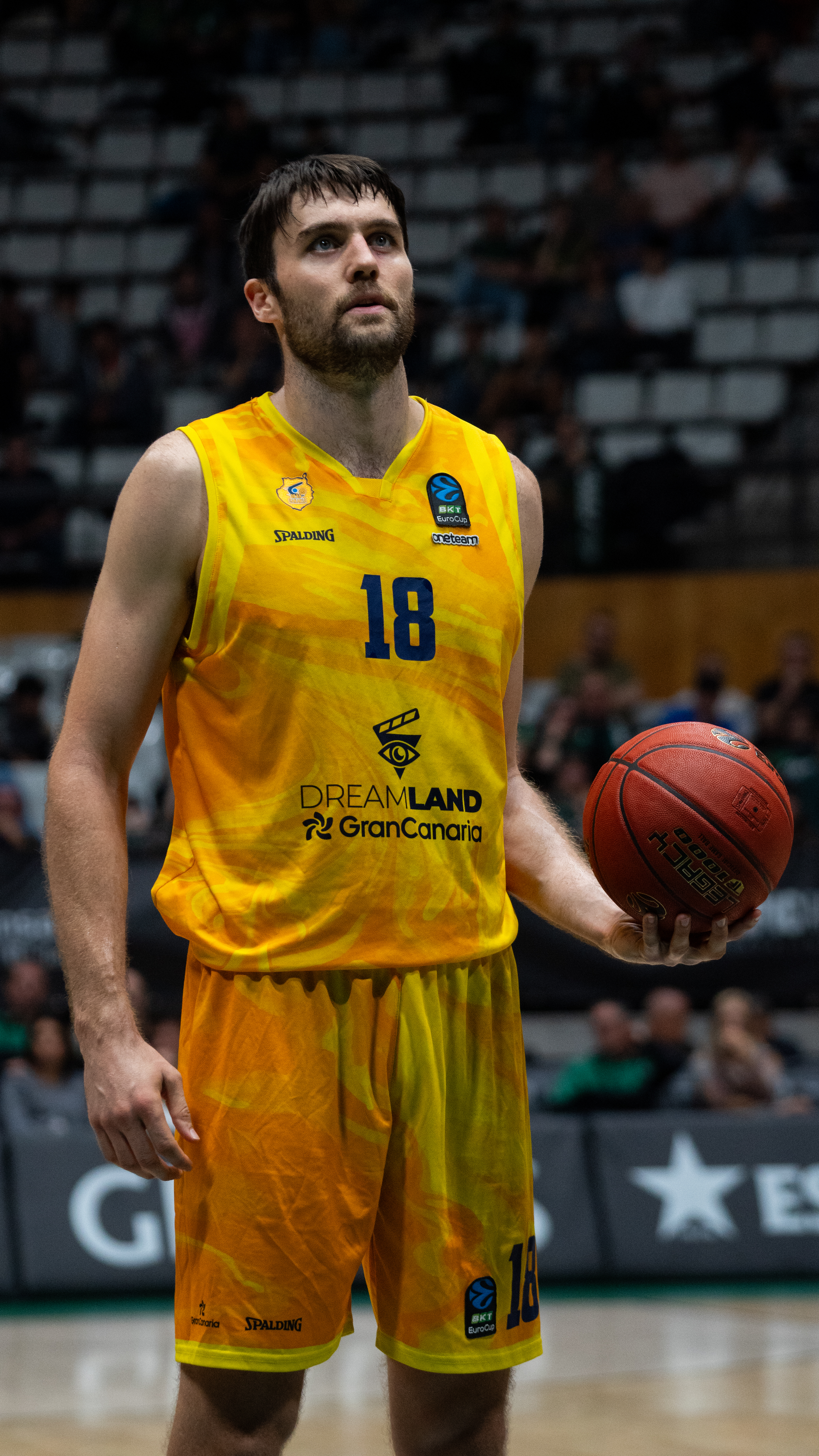
- Tobey, playing for Gran Canaria in 2024

No. 10 – Tezenis Verona
- Position: Center
- League: LBA

Personal information
- Born: October 10, 1994 (age 32) Monroe, New York, U.S.
- Listed height: 7 ft 0 in (2.13 m)
- Listed weight: 253 lb (115 kg)

Career information
- High school: Blair Academy (Blairstown, New Jersey)
- College: Virginia (2012–2016)
- NBA draft: 2016: undrafted
- Playing career: 2016–present

Career history
- 2016–2017: Greensboro Swarm
- 2017: Charlotte Hornets
- 2017: Valencia
- 2017–2018: Canarias
- 2018–2022: Valencia
- 2022–2023: FC Barcelona
- 2023–2024: Crvena zvezda
- 2024–2026: Gran Canaria
- 2026–present: Scaligera Basket Verona

Career highlights
- EuroCup champion (2019); FIBA Intercontinental Cup champion (2017); FIBA Intercontinental Cup MVP (2017); 2× Liga ACB champion (2017, 2023); ABA League champion (2024); ACC Sixth Man of the Year (2015)
- Stats at NBA.com
- Stats at Basketball Reference
Medals
Men's basketball
Representing the United States
FIBA World U19 Cup
Gold medal – first place	2013 Czech Republic	National team

Michael Edward Tobey (born October 10, 1994) is an American–born naturalized Slovenian professional basketball player for Scaligera Basket Verona of the Lega Basket Serie A (LBA). He played college basketball for the Virginia Cavaliers.

== High school career ==
After attending Monroe-Woodbury Middle School, Tobey attended Blair Academy where he averaged 21 points and nine rebounds. He was a Top 100 Recruit by ESPN and Rivals.com.

== College career ==
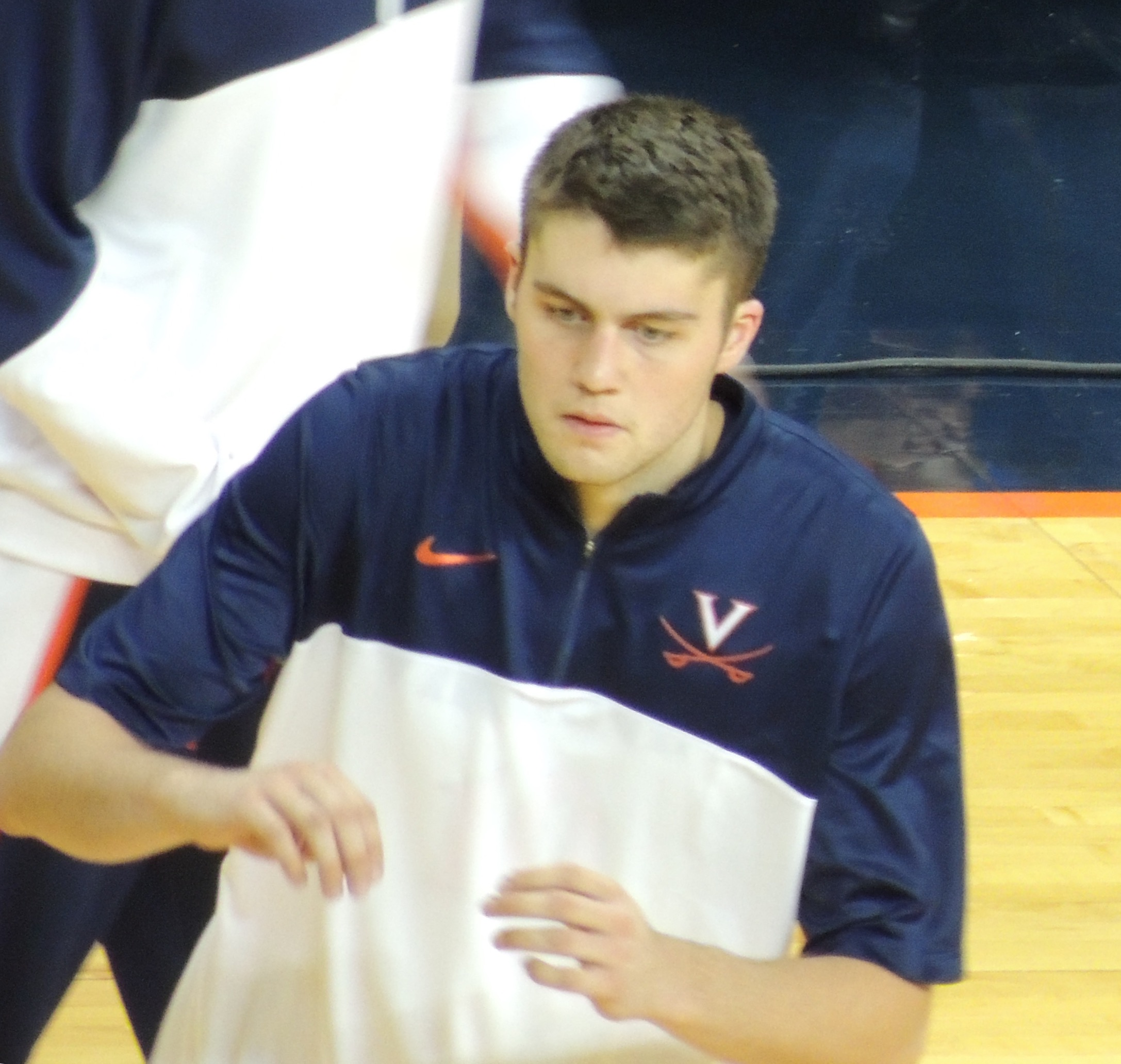
Tobey with the Virginia Cavaliers in 2013.

Tobey committed to UVA over schools such as Maryland, Pittsburgh, and Xavier. During his time at Virginia, he split time between being a starter and being one of the first substitutes off the bench. His play off the bench earned him the ACC Sixth Man of the Year award in 2015. Tobey was on the United States national under-19 basketball team that won the 2013 FIBA Under-19 World Championship. Tobey ended his collegiate career as Virginia's all-time leader in games played, appearing in 138 games over his four years.

== Professional career ==
=== Charlotte Hornets and Greensboro Swarm (2016–2017) ===
After going undrafted in the 2016 NBA draft, Tobey joined the Charlotte Hornets for the Orlando Summer League and the Utah Jazz for the Las Vegas Summer League. On July 25, 2016, he signed with the Hornets, but was waived on October 22, 2016, after appearing in two preseason games. On October 31, 2016, he was acquired by the Greensboro Swarm of the NBA Development League as an affiliate player of the Hornets. On February 3, 2017, he returned to the Hornets on a 10-day contract. On February 13, 2017, he signed a second 10-day contract with Charlotte, despite having not appeared in a game during his first 10-day contract. He made his NBA debut two days later, recording two points and three rebounds in 11 minutes off the bench in a 90–85 loss to the Toronto Raptors. On February 24, 2017, after the second 10-day contract expired, Tobey returned to the Swarm.

=== Valencia Basket (2017) ===
On March 16, 2017, Tobey signed with Spanish club Valencia for the rest of the 2016–17 ACB season. He won the Liga ACB that year, albeit being injured for some time before the playoffs, which hindered his performance and limited his minutes during the playoffs. On June 30, 2017, Valencia announced that they did not renew their contract with Tobey. In his first season at Valencia, he averaged 5.3 points, 4.7 rebounds and 0.3 assists in the 2016–17 ACB season.

=== Tenerife (2017–2018) ===
On July 24, 2017, Tobey signed with Tenerife for the 2017–18 ACB season.

On September 24, 2017, Tobey won the FIBA Intercontinental Cup with Tenerife after beating Guaros de Lara 76–71. Tobey was named Most Valuable Player of the game after recording 21 points and 9 rebounds.

On December 23, 2017, Tobey scored a career-high of 24 points in one game against Urbas Fuenlabrada in the Liga ACB. He posted three double-doubles in the 2017–18 ACB season, on October 1, 2017, against San Pablo Burgos, on March 11, 2018, against Zaragoza, and on April 15, 2018, against Baskonia. He also posted a double-double of 18 points and 16 rebounds against Real Madrid, in the 2018 ACB Playoffs. Tobey recorded two double-doubles in the 2017–18 Basketball Champions League, on January 10, 2018, against Gaziantep and on March 14, 2018, against UCAM Murcia. He averaged 10.6 points, 6.3 rebounds, and 0.6 assists in the 2017–18 ACB season.

=== Return to Valencia (2018–2022) ===
On July 9, 2018, Tobey signed a two-year deal with Valencia Basket after Tenerife did not match the Valencian offer for the restricted free agent. On October 1, it was announced that Tobey would miss three weeks of action due to a sprained right shoulder.

Tobey posted one double-double of 16 points and 10 rebounds in the 2018–19 ACB season. He recorded it against Zaragoza on December 29, 2018. In the 2018–19 ACB he averaged 8.7 points, 5.1 rebounds, and 0.5 assists, while he averaged 7.9 points, 5 rebounds and 1 assist in the 2018–19 EuroCup.

He recorded four double-doubles in the 2019–20 season, all in the 2020 ACB Playoffs, against Andorra, Zaragoza, San Pablo Burgos, and Gran Canaria. On May 12, 2019, Tobey matched his career-high of 24 points in one game against Movistar Estudiantes in a Liga ACB game. Tobey averaged 6.3 points, 5 rebounds and 0.4 assists in the 2019–20 ACB season. He averaged 8.1 points, 4.3 rebounds and 0.6 assists in EuroLeague the same season. He posted his first double-double in EuroLeague on November 21, 2019, against Khimki, in an eventual 89–84 win. With his 10 rebounds, Tobey was also Valencia's rebounding leader in that game. He was also the rebounding leader in Valencia's 59–66 win over Bayern Munich. That season Tobey was also among the top performers in Valencia's EuroLeague wins over Alba Berlin, Fenerbahçe, and Zenit Saint Petersburg.

On July 12, 2020, Valencia Basket announced that Tobey renewed his contract with them for two more years.

Tobey recorded two double-doubles in the 2020–21 ACB season, on October 27, 2020, against Monbus Obradoiro, and on January 24, 2021, against Baskonia. He averaged 9.8 points, 4.5 rebounds, and 0.9 assists in the 2020–21 Liga Endesa, and 9.6 points, 5 rebounds and 0.8 assists in the 2020–21 EuroLeague.

In the 2020–21 EuroLeague he led Valencia to a 83–76 win over Bayern Munich, scoring 18 points. He also dished out 2 assists and grabbed 4 rebounds, and with a 22 PIR was Valencia's top performer of the game. He scored the go-ahead two-pointer, bringing the score to 70–68. After Bayern tied at 70 and Sam Van Rossom again pulled Valencia ahead by making 2/2 free-throws, Tobey helped to extend the lead with 4 rebounds, 1 assist and a two-pointer. He was the top performer in Valencia's win over eventual 2020–21 EuroLeague champion Anadolu Efes, grabbing 8 rebounds and scoring 21 points for a 27 PIR. With a 18 PIR was among the top performers against Khimki, which Valencia defeated 88–82. He was also the rebounding leader of the game with 8 rebounds

He was among the top performers against Zenit Saint Petersburg, in a 62–91 win for Valencia. He grabbed 4 rebounds, dished out 3 assists and by making 5/5 field goals and 2/2 free throws scored 12 points, for a 23 PIR. He was Valencia's rebounding leader in their 91–71 win over Crvena Zvezda, and with a 18 PIR he was among the top performers for Valencia in that game. With a PIR of 19, he was Vaencia's top performer in their 68–77 win over Khimki, being also the game's rebounding leader and approaching double-double with 9 rebounds and 12 points. On January 7, 2021, he posted his second EuroLeague double-double against Barcelona.

=== FC Barcelona (2022–2023) ===
On July 26, 2022, FC Barcelona announced that they had signed Tobey to a one-year contract. In 31 EuroLeague matches, he averaged 5.9 points and 2.9 rebounds, playing around 14 minutes per contest.

=== Crvena zvezda (2023–2024) ===
On July 14, 2023, Tobey signed a one-year contract with Crvena zvezda of the Serbian KLS, the ABA League, and the EuroLeague. On June 10, 2024, he parted ways with the Serbian club.

=== Gran Canaria (2024–2026) ===
On July 10, 2024, Gran Canaria signed Tobey to a one-year contract.

=== Scaligera Basket Verona (2026–present) ===
On August 12, 2026, he signed a one year-deal with Scaligera Basket Verona of the Lega Basket Serie A.

== National team career ==
In 2021, Tobey secured his Slovenian passport in preparation for the 2020 Olympic Qualifying Tournaments. He made his debut for the Slovenia national team on June 18, 2021, during a pre-Qualifying friendly win against Croatia. In this game he posted a double-double of 26 points and 11 rebounds. He was also Slovenia's second scoring leader and the rebounds leader.

=== 2020 Summer Olympics ===
Tobey grabbed 10 rebounds in Slovenia's 112–77 win over Poland at the 2020 FIBA Men's Olympic Qualifying Tournament in Kaunas. In the Final round he posted a double-double against Venezuela, being also the scoring and rebounding leader with 27 points and 12 rebounds. Tobey helped Slovenia to defeat Lithuania 85–96 in the tournament's final in Kaunas, scoring 13 points. With this win Slovenia achieved their historic qualification to the men's basketball tournament at the 2020 Summer Olympics, while Lithuania missed their first Olympics since the independence in 1990.

Tobey posted a double-double in Slovenia's debut against Argentina, a game they won 100–118. He scored 11 points and grabbed 14 rebounds in this game. Next, Slovenia faced host Japan. They defeated them 116–81, and Tobey chimed in with 11 rebounds, 6 points, and 3 assists. In the third and final game of the group stage, Slovenia faced reigning world champion Spain. With a minute and a half left to play, Tobey caught an alley-oop from Prepelič, making the dunk that closed the game. Slovenia eventually won the game 87–95. Tobey was Slovenia's most efficient player in that game and was named player of the day by FIBA. In this game he recorded his second double-double in the tournament, scoring 16 points and grabbing 14 rebounds. The win gave them the group's top seed, and they were set to face Germany in the quarter-finals.

He was among Slovenia's players who were especially praised for their performances against Germany in the tournament's first quarter-final. He scored 13 points and grabbed 11 rebounds, recording his third double-double in the tournament. Slovenia lost a dramatic semi-final against France by one point, 89–90. Tobey was among Slovenia's top performers with Dončić and Prepelič. He scored 23 points and was just two rebounds away from his fourth double-double in the tournament. With three double-doubles, he tied with Dončić for the tournament's double-double leader. Slovenia eventually faced Australia in the bronze medal game, which they lost 93–107.

Tobey played a key role in Slovenia's run to the semi-finals. He and Valencia teammate Klemen Prepelič were credited as Slovenia's best players at the Tokyo Olympics after Luka Dončić.

== Personal life ==
Mike is the son of Ken and Kathleen Tobey. He has an older brother named Kenneth and a younger sister named Elizabeth. Tobey majored in history while at the University of Virginia. He wore number 10 in high school and college because he was born on October 10 at 10 a.m. and weighed 10 pounds at birth. Ken Sr. played basketball at St. Thomas Aquinas College, while Elizabeth received a full scholarship to Delaware for volleyball.

== Career statistics ==
Legend
GP	Games played	GS	Games started	MPG	Minutes per game
FG%	Field-goal percentage	3P%	3-point field-goal percentage	FT%	Free-throw percentage
RPG	Rebounds per game	APG	Assists per game	SPG	Steals per game
BPG	Blocks per game	PPG	Points per game	PIR	Performance index rating
**Bold**	Career high

=== NBA ===
==== Regular season ====
Year	Team	GP	GS	MPG	FG%	3P%	FT%	RPG	APG	SPG	BPG	PPG
2016–17	Charlotte	2	0	12.6	.250	—	—	1.5	.5	—	—	1.0
Career		2	0	12.6	.250	—	—	1.5	.5	—	—	1.0

=== EuroLeague ===
Year	Team	GP	GS	MPG	FG%	3P%	FT%	RPG	APG	SPG	BPG	PPG	PIR
2019–20	Valencia	21	2	15.3	.516	.308	.711	4.3	.6	**.5**	**.5**	8.1	8.7
2020–21	Valencia	**33**	9	**18.7**	**.606**	.396	.814	**5.0**	**.8**	.4	.4	**9.6**	**11.7**
2022–23	Barcelona	31	**12**	13.9	.562	**.412**	**1.000**	2.9	.5	.2	.2	5.9	6.0
2023–24	Crvena zvezda	30	2	10.9	.402	.267	.615	2.3	.3	.2	.4	3.7	2.8
Career		115	25	14.8	.538	.356	.765	3.6	.6	.3	.4	6.8	7.3

=== EuroCup ===
†	Denotes season in which Tobey won the EuroCup

Year	Team	GP	GS	MPG	FG%	3P%	FT%	RPG	APG	SPG	BPG	PPG	PIR
2018–19†	Valencia	22	10	16.3	**.574**	.333	.486	5.0	1.0	**.3**	**.8**	7.9	9.1
2021–22	Valencia	16	16	18.8	.553	**.400**	625	**5.7**	.5	**.3**	.6	**10.3**	11.6
2024–25	Gran Canaria	**25**	**24**	**20.8**	.561	**.400**	**.846**	5.6	**1.4**	**.3**	.6	9.2	**12.4**
Career		63	50	18.7	.563	.383	.660	5.4	1.0	.3	.7	9.0	11.0

=== Basketball Champions League ===
Year	Team	GP	GS	MPG	FG%	3P%	FT%	RPG	APG	SPG	BPG	PPG
2017–18	Canarias	14	13	20.9	.658	.667	.658	7.0	.5	.4	1.1	13.5
Career		14	13	20.9	.658	.667	.658	7.0	.5	.4	1.1	13.5

=== Domestic leagues ===
Year	Team	League	GP	MPG	FG%	3P%	FT%	RPG	APG	SPG	BPG	PPG
2016–17	(United States) Greensboro Swarm	D-League	35	26.7	.516	.196	.729	9.0	1.0	.8	1.3	12.0
2016–17	(Spain) Valencia	ACB	3	9.9	.615	.000	—	4.7	.3	.3	.3	5.3
2017–18	(Spain) Canarias	ACB	35	21.4	.559	.333	.580	6.6	.6	.3	.8	11.1
2018–19	(Spain) Valencia	ACB	36	15.6	.547	.308	.761	4.9	.5	.3	.5	8.9
2019–20	(Spain) Valencia	ACB	23	17.1	.569	.379	.571	6.4	.6	.2	.6	8.4
2020–21	(Spain) Valencia	ACB	41	18.3	.624	.407	.712	4.3	.8	.4	.4	9.8
2021–22	(Spain) Valencia	ACB	25	15.7	.556	.364	.706	4.0	.2	.4	.8	6.6
2022–23	(Spain) Barcelona	ACB	22	13.7	.449	.333	1.000	3.2	.3	.3	.4	4.0
2023–24	(Serbia) Crvena zvezda	ABA	26	17.1	.560	.393	.783	5.1	.8	.6	.8	8.8

=== College ===
Year	Team	GP	GS	MPG	FG%	3P%	FT%	RPG	APG	SPG	BPG	PPG
2012–13	Virginia	30	2	13.9	.530	**.600**	**.794**	2.9	**.4**	.1	.6	6.8
2013–14	Virginia	**37**	**28**	**18.1**	.481	.333	.679	3.8	.3	.2	**1.1**	6.4
2014–15	Virginia	34	11	17.1	.514	—	.746	**5.1**	**.4**	**.3**	.6	6.9
2015–16	Virginia	**37**	7	15.7	**.601**	.200	.620	4.4	**.4**	**.3**	.6	**7.3**
Career		138	48	16.3	.531	.316	.704	4.0	.4	.2	.7	6.8
