= 2020 FIBA Men's Olympic Qualifying Tournaments – Belgrade =

2020 FIBA World Olympic Qualifying Tournament for Men
Belgrade, Serbia

Tournament details
- Host country: Serbia
- Dates: 29 June – 4 July 2021
- Teams: 5
- Venue(s): 1 (in 1 host city)

Final positions
- Champions: Italy

Tournament statistics
- MVP: (Italy) Achille Polonara
- Top scorer: (Puerto Rico) Gian Clavell (20.5)
- Top rebounds: (Italy) Achille Polonara (9.3)
- Top assists: (Puerto Rico) Gary Browne (13.0)
- PPG (Team): Serbia (93.5)
- RPG (Team): Italy (38.3)
- APG (Team): Serbia (25.0)

Official website
- WOQT Serbia

The 2020 FIBA Men's Olympic Qualifying Tournament in Belgrade was one of four 2020 FIBA Men's Olympic Qualifying Tournaments. The tournament was held in Belgrade, Serbia. It was originally scheduled to take place from 23 to 28 June 2020 but was postponed due to the COVID-19 pandemic, to 29 June to 4 July 2021.

Following the 2016 FIBA World Olympic Qualifying Tournament, it was the second consecutive men's Olympic qualifying tournament held in Belgrade, Serbia.

== Teams ==
New Zealand initially qualified for the Olympic Qualifying Tournament by virtue of the 2019 FIBA Basketball World Cup. On 26 February 2021, Basketball New Zealand announced that they would pull out of the tournament. On the same day, FIBA announced that they would be replaced by the Philippines as the next-best team from the Asia-Oceania region in FIBA World Rankings.

Senegal had been initially included in the Belgrade Tournament, but it has been forced to withdraw before the start due to several COVID-19 positive cases, and not being replaced by any team, lowering the number of participants to 5.

Team	Qualification	Date of qualification	FIBA World Ranking
Serbia	5th at the 2019 FIBA Basketball World Cup	15 September 2019	5th
Italy	9th at the 2019 FIBA Basketball World Cup	15 September 2019	10th
Puerto Rico	15th at the 2019 FIBA Basketball World Cup	15 September 2019	18th
Dominican Republic	16th at the 2019 FIBA Basketball World Cup	15 September 2019	19th
~~Senegal~~	Wild card	19 September 2019	35th
Philippines	Wild card	26 February 2021	31st

== Venue ==
Belgrade	2020 FIBA Men's Olympic Qualifying Tournaments – Belgrade (Serbia)
Aleksandar Nikolić Hall	2020 FIBA Men's Olympic Qualifying Tournaments – Belgrade (Serbia)
Capacity: 8,000	2020 FIBA Men's Olympic Qualifying Tournaments – Belgrade (Serbia)

== Preliminary round ==
All times are local (UTC+2).

=== Group A ===
Pos	Team	Pld	W	L	PF	PA	PD	Pts	Qualification
1	Serbia (H)	2	2	0	177	152	+25	4	Semi-finals
2	Dominican Republic	2	1	1	170	161	+9	3	Semi-finals
3	Philippines	2	0	2	143	177	−34	2	

Source: FIBA
Rules for classification: 1) points; 2) head-to-head points; 3) head-to-head points difference; 4) head-to-head number of points scored.
(H) Hosts

29 June 2021
20:15

Boxscore

Dominican Republic	76–94	Serbia
Scoring by quarter: 23–31, 24–16, 19–20, 10–27
Pts: Liz, Torres 16; Rebs: Liz 9 Asts: Solano, Torres 4		Pts: Marjanović 18; Rebs: Marjanović 10; Asts: Teodosić 6

Aleksandar Nikolić Hall, Belgrade
Attendance: 1,078
Referees: Guilherme Locatelli (BRA), Mārtiņš Kozlovskis (LAT), Georgios Poursanidis (GRE)

30 June 2021
20:15

Boxscore

Serbia	83–76	Philippines
Scoring by quarter: 22–16, 23–18, 22–28, 16–14
Pts: Marjanović 25; Rebs: Marjanović 10; Asts: Teodosić 6		Pts: Kouame 17; Rebs: Kouame 7 Asts: Belangel 6

Aleksandar Nikolić Hall, Belgrade
Attendance: 1,256
Referees: Yohan Rosso (FRA), Omar Bermúdez (MEX), James Boyer (AUS)

1 July 2021
20:30

Boxscore

Philippines	67–94	Dominican Republic
Scoring by quarter: 22–23, 19–16, 10–26, 16–29
Pts: Heading 16; Rebs: Kouame 6 Asts: Belangel 10		Pts: Liz 23; Rebs: Araújo 7 Asts: Torres 6

Aleksandar Nikolić Hall, Belgrade
Attendance: 200
Referees: Guilherme Locatelli (BRA), Mārtiņš Kozlovskis (LAT), Kingsley Ojeaburu (NGA)

=== Group B ===
Senegal did not participate in the Qualifying Tournament. On 28 June, they informed FIBA about COVID-19 related disruptions to their preparations in Germany. Afterwards, their scheduled games with Puerto Rico and Italy did not take place.

Therefore, in Group B only one match has been played between Puerto Rico and Italy: the winner of this game finished first of group B and faced the second placed team of Group A, the other team finished second of Group B and faced the first placed team of group A, in the semi-finals. In fact, FIBA did not considered Senegal as a participant and did not applied the Rule 20.2.1, which could have awarded Senegal's opponents the game with score as 20 to 0 (Article 20 discusses the games lost by forfeit). FIBA indeed did not drew up any standings.

1 July 2021
16:30

Boxscore

Italy	90–83	Puerto Rico
Scoring by quarter: 18–24, 19–20, 27–14, 26–25
Pts: three players 21; Rebs: Polonara 11; Asts: Mannion 6		Pts: Clavell 24; Rebs: Browne 9 Asts: Browne 16

Aleksandar Nikolić Hall, Belgrade
Attendance: 200
Referees: Yohan Rosso (FRA), Omar Bermúdez (MEX), Yener Yılmaz (TUR)

== Final round ==
Semi-finals
3 July
Serbia	102
Puerto Rico	84
3 July
Italy	79
Dominican Republic	59

Final
4 July
Serbia	95
Italy	102

=== Semi-finals ===
3 July 2021
13:00

Boxscore

Italy	79–59	Dominican Republic
Scoring by quarter: 22–14, 20–16, 24–8, 13–21
Pts: Fontecchio 17; Rebs: three players 5 Asts: four players 3		Pts: Francis 12; Rebs: Santos 7 Asts: Mendoza, Solano 4

Aleksandar Nikolić Hall, Belgrade
Attendance: 502
Referees: Guilherme Locatelli (BRA), Mārtiņš Kozlovskis (LAT), Georgios Poursanidis (GRE)

3 July 2021
16:00

Boxscore

Serbia	102–84	Puerto Rico
Scoring by quarter: 28–26, 23–14, 28–28, 23–16
Pts: Micić 21; Rebs: Petrušev 8 Asts: Teodosić 10		Pts: Piñeiro 23; Rebs: Browne 5 Asts: Browne 10

Aleksandar Nikolić Hall, Belgrade
Attendance: 2,388
Referees: Yohan Rosso (FRA), Omar Bermúdez (MEX), Yener Yılmaz (TUR)

=== Final ===
4 July 2021
20:30

Boxscore

Serbia	95–102	Italy
Scoring by quarter: 22–28, 23–29, 18–23, 32–22
Pts: Anđušić 27; Rebs: Kalinić 6 Asts: Kalinić, Teodosić 5		Pts: Mannion 24; Rebs: Polonara 12; Asts: Pajola 6

Aleksandar Nikolić Hall, Belgrade
Attendance: 3,728
Referees: Guilherme Locatelli (BRA), Yohan Rosso (FRA), Mārtiņš Kozlovskis (LAT)

== Final ranking ==
#	Team	W–L	Qualification
1	Italy	3–0	Qualified for the Olympics
2	Serbia	3–1	
3	Puerto Rico	0–2	
4	Dominican Republic	1–2	
5	Philippines	0–2	

== See also ==
- 2020 FIBA Women's Olympic Qualifying Tournaments – Belgrade
- 2020 FIBA Women's Olympic Qualifying Tournaments – Belgrade 2
