= Gregor Hrovat =

Slovenian basketball player (born 1994)

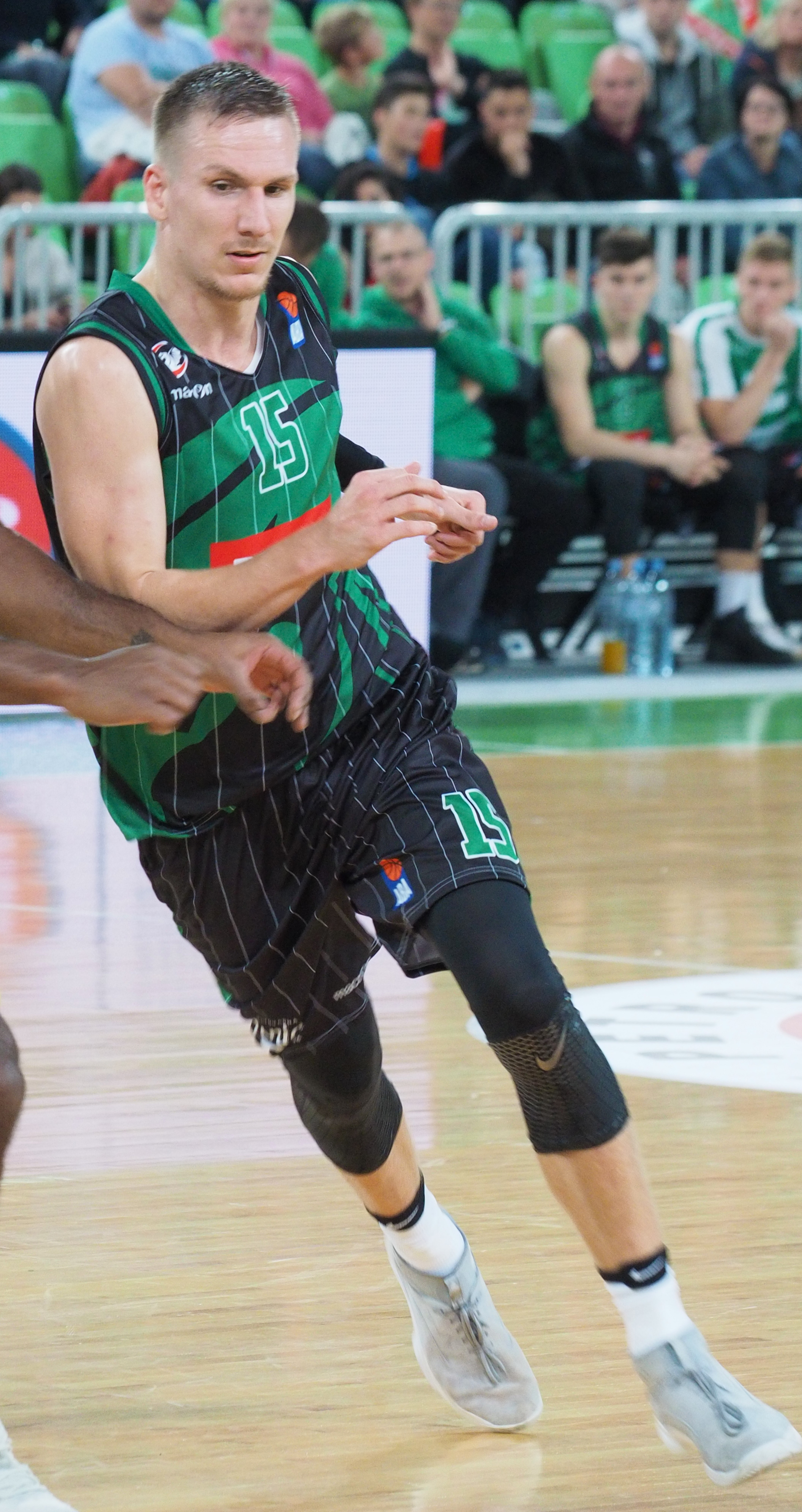

No. 15 – Élan Béarnais
- Position: Shooting guard / small forward
- League: LNB Élite

Personal information
- Born: 18 August 1994 (age 32) Koper, Slovenia
- Listed height: 1.96 m (6 ft 5 in)
- Listed weight: 94 kg (207 lb)

Career information
- NBA draft: 2016: undrafted
- Playing career: 2011–present

Career history
- 2009–2011: Koš Koper
- 2011–2014: Helios Domžale
- 2011–2012: →Logatec
- 2014–2018: Union / Petrol Olimpija
- 2018–2019: Medi Bayreuth
- 2019–2020: Afyon Belediye
- 2020–2021: Cholet Basket
- 2021–2022: Élan Béarnais
- 2022–2026: JDA Dijon
- 2026–present: Élan Béarnais

Career highlights
- 2× Slovenian League champion (2017, 2018); Slovenian Cup winner (2017); Slovenian Supercup winner (2017); French Cup winner (2022)

Gregor Hrovat (born 18 August 1994) is a Slovenian professional basketball player for Élan Béarnais of the French LNB Élite. With his 1.96 m (6 ft 5 in) he plays as a swingman. He also represents the Slovenian national team.

== Early life ==
Hrovat was born in the coastal city of Koper, Slovenia, where he also started his basketball career at Koš Koper.

He was a member of the Slovenian U-16, U-18 and U-20 national team. He played at the 2012 FIBA Europe Under-18 Championship where he averaged 15.4 points, 5.8 rebounds and 2.5 assists. Next year he also played in 2013 FIBA Europe Under-20 Championship.

== Professional career ==
Hrovat signed his first professional basketball deal in 2011 with Helios Domžale. In his first year he was loaned to BC Logatec for one season. In 2012, he made a return to Helios Domžale, where he remained until 2014. During this period, he also participated in the 2014 Slovenian All-Star Game.

=== Union / Petrol Olimpija ===
On 25 May 2014 he signed a three-year deal with the Slovenian team Union Olimpija. In the years 2014 - 2016 he played Slovenian league, ABA League and the EuroCup. In 2016 he signed a new deal extending his contract with Olimpija for additional year. In 2016-2017 he became a team captain and led Union Olimpija to victory in Slovenian Cup, averaging 12 points, 6.8 rebounds, 6.5 assists and 4 steals. The same year they also became Slovenian League champions after 7 years. In 37 games he averaged 12.8 points, 3.8 rebounds, 3.9 assists and 2.2 steals. The same year he also played in ABA League, where he averaged 10.8 points, 5.2 rebounds and 4 assists, and in EuroCup, where in 8 games he averaged 9.5 points. In his last year with Petrol Olimpija he won the Slovenian Supercup and Slovenian League. This was his best season as he averaged 12 points, 3.5 rebounds, 4.7 assists, 1.9 steals in ABA League, and 11.2 points, 2.6 rebounds, 3 assists and 1.7 steals in his first year off playing Champions League.

=== Medi Bayreuth ===
On 2 July 2018 Hrovat signed a one-year deal with German club Medi Bayreuth. He showed great performances in Basketball Bundesliga, such as against SC Rasta Vechta when he scored 17 points, 7 rebounds, 3 assists, 3 steals and a block. He also played 14 Champions League games that year, averaging 8.4 points, 2.9 rebounds, 4.1 assists and 1.7 steals in 22 minutes. He showed that he is really a versatile player, especially at the games against Beşiktaş and Telekom Baskets Bonn where he scored 13 points and added 5 rebounds, 6 assists and 3 steals in the first game and 16 points, 3 assists and 5 steals in the second.

=== Afyon Belediye ===
On 5 September 2019 he signed with Afyon Belediye of the Turkish Basketball Super League (BSL). On March 8, 2020, he played his most efficient match in Turkish Basketball Super League, against Tofaş S.K. where he scored 17 points and added 7 rebounds, 8 assists and 4 steals. Hrovat averaged 12.4 points, 4 rebounds and 4.7 assists per game. He was the 5th stealer of the Turkish league with 39 steals in 21 games.

=== Cholet ===
On 1 September 2020 he signed an open-contract with the Helios Suns. However, on September 20 he instead signed with Cholet Basket of the French LNB Pro A league. He quickly adapted to the French league and became one of the Cholet lead players. In 33 games in LNB Pro A he averaged 12.9 points with 60.5% shooting for 2 points and 35.4% for 3, 3.6 rebounds, 3.2 assists and 1.7 steal per game. He showed the best performances against JL Bourg Basket and Orléans Loiret Basket where he ended the game with the efficiency of 30. In this particular games he gathered 24 points, 4 rebounds, 4 assists, 3 steals (against Bourg) and 22 points, 5 rebounds, 2 assists, 4 steals (against Orleans). He also played 6 games in Basketball Champions League, where he averaged 10.8 points, 4.2 rebounds, 4.3 assists and 1.5 steal. He was the first player in a 5-year Basketball Champions League history that had 10+ points, 10+ assists, 5+ rebounds and 5+ steals in a single game. He managed to accomplish that at the home game against BC Tsmoki-Minsk where he put up 13 points, 12 assists, 6 rebounds and 5 steals, with a 23 efficiency.

=== Élan Béarnais ===
On 10 July 2021 he signed with Élan Béarnais of the French LNB Pro A. They competed in the Coupe de France where they had 6 games in total. On the 26th of March 2022 they won against Fos Provence Basket in the quarterfinals with 93–72. They followed up with another win in semifinals the next day against BCM Gravelines-Dunkerque. Hrovat earned the MVP of semifinals title when in 20 minutes he obtained an impressive 19 points, 6 rebounds and 2 assists. On 23 April 2022 they won the Coupe de France finals against SIG Strasbourg in Accor Arena in Paris and became the French Cup winners of 2022.

=== JDA Dijon ===
On 11 July 2022, he signed with JDA Dijon of the French LNB Pro A and the Basketball Champions League. On 8 June 2023, he extended his contract for one more season. After briefly becoming a free agent following the 2023–24 season, he rejoined Dijon on 12 November 2024 on a one-year deal. On 5 June 2025, he re-signed for another season, which would be his last with the club.

=== Élan Béarnais ===
On 12 October 2026, he signed a two-year contract with Élan Béarnais of the LNB Élite.

== Slovenian national team ==
Hrovat made his debut for the Slovenian national team on 24 November 2017, at the 2019 FIBA Basketball World Cup qualification game against Belarus national team. Since then he played 6 more games in the FIBA World Cup qualifications and averaged 7.6 points, 3 rebounds, 1.4 assists and 2.1 steals per game.

In June 2021, he was part of the team that represented Slovenia in 2020 FIBA Men's Olympic Qualifying Tournaments in Kaunas, Lithuania. Slovenia played 4 games. Group phase against Angola (Hrovat put up 10 points, 4 rebounds, 1 assist) and Poland (Hrovat managed to get 16 points, 5 rebounds, 1 assist), semifinals against Venezuela and finals against Lithuania. They won the qualifying tournament and qualified to the 2020 Summer Olympics in Tokyo, Japan. He was later also part of the team at the 2020 Summer Olympics where Slovenia men's national basketball team finished in the 4th place.
