= Jakob Čebašek =

Slovenian basketball player

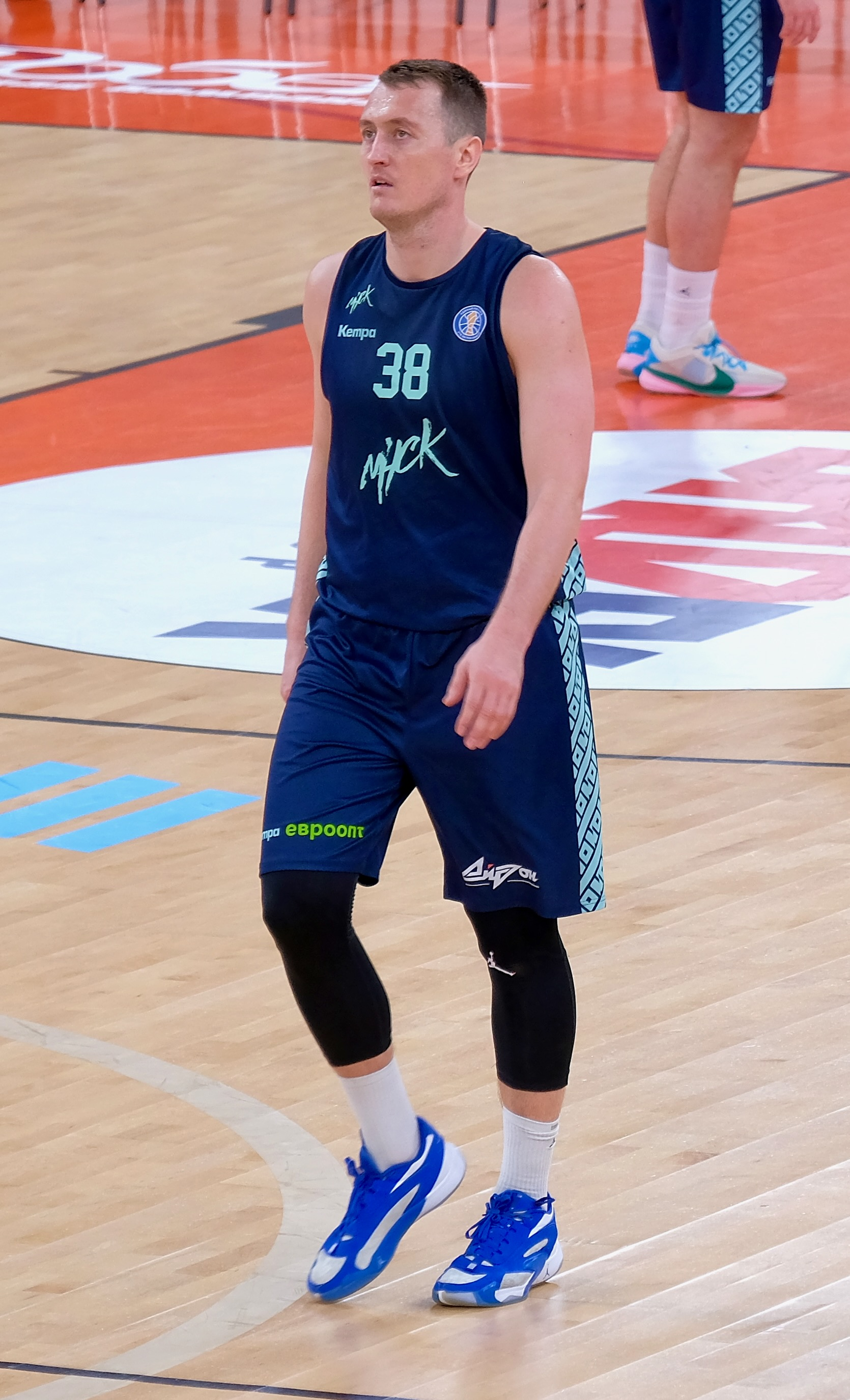

No. 55 – Rucker San Vendemiano
- Position: Small forward / power forward
- League: Serie B

Personal information
- Born: April 28, 1991 (age 35) Ljubljana, SR Slovenia, SFR Yugoslavia
- Listed height: 2.00 m (6 ft 7 in)
- Listed weight: 102 kg (225 lb)

Career information
- NBA draft: 2013: undrafted
- Playing career: 2007–present

Career history
- 2007–2012: Parklji Ljubljana
- 2014-2015: Maribor Nova KBM
- 2015: Elektra Šoštanj
- 2015–2016: Zlatorog Laško
- 2016–2017: Hopsi Polzela
- 2017–2018: Liège Basket
- 2018–2019: Kangoeroes Basket Mechelen
- 2019: Sixt Primorska
- 2019-2020: Šentjur
- 2020: Allianz Pallacanestro Trieste
- 2021: Dinamo București
- 2021–2022: Leuven Bears
- 2022–2023: Constanța
- 2023–2024: BC Minsk
- 2024–2025: Krka
- 2025–present: Rucker San Vendemiano

Career highlights
- Slovenian League champion (2019); ABA League 2 champion (2019); Slovenian Cup winner (2019); Slovenian League Regular Season MVP (2017)

Jakob Čebašek (born April 28, 1991) is a Slovenian professional basketball player who plays for Rucker San Vendemiano of the Italian Serie B. He is a 2.00 m tall Forward.

== Professional career ==
Čebašek started playing professional basketball for Parklji Ljubljana.

In August 2014, Čebašek signed with Maribor Nova KBM. In February 2015, he parted with Maribor Nova KBM and signed with Elektra Šoštanj for the rest of the season.

On July 23, 2015, he signed a one-year deal with Zlatorog Laško.

In August 2016, Čebašek signed with Hopsi Polzela.

On July 10, 2017, he signed a one-year deal with Belgium club Liège Basket.

On October 15, 2020, he signed a short-term contract with Allianz Pallacanestro Trieste of the Italian Serie A that was having many injuries. Čebašek parted ways with the team on November 9 after appearing in one game.

In March 2021 he moved to Dinamo București in the Romanian Liga Națională. Čebašek debuted in April 1 against CSO Voluntari where he scored 17 points.

On June 30, 2021, he signed a one-year deal with Belgium club Leuven Bears.

== International career ==
Čebašek made his debut for the Slovenian national team on 14 September 2018, at the 2019 FIBA Basketball World Cup qualification game against Latvia.
