= Dragiša Drobnjak =

Slovenian basketball player (born 1977)

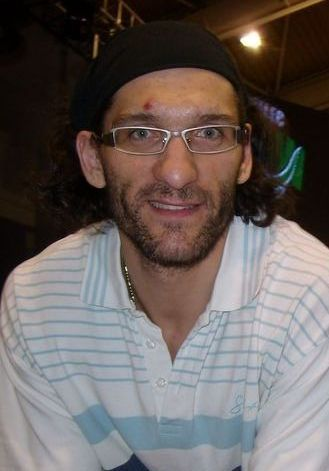

Personal information
- Born: 5 November 1977 (age 49) Kranj, SR Slovenia, SFR Yugoslavia
- Listed height: 2.00 m (6 ft 7 in)
- Listed weight: 102 kg (225 lb)

Career information
- NBA draft: 1999: undrafted
- Playing career: 1996–2018
- Position: Power forward
- Coaching career: 2019–present

Career history

Playing
- 1996–1999: Triglav Kranj
- 1999–2003: Krka
- 2003–2004: Geoplin Slovan
- 2004–2006: Union Olimpija
- 2006–2008: Turów Zgorzelec
- 2008: Krka
- 2008: Alba Berlin
- 2008–2009: Turów Zgorzelec
- 2009: NSB Napoli
- 2009–2010: BC Oostende
- 2010–2011: Krka
- 2011–2013: BC Oostende
- 2013–2014: Union Olimpija
- 2014–2016: Tajfun
- 2016: Krka
- 2016–2018: Rogaška

Coaching
- 2019: Petrol Olimpija (assistant)
- 2019–2020: Cedevita Olimpija (assistant)
- 2020–2023: Slovenia (assistant)
- 2023-present: Rogaška

Dragiša Drobnjak (born 5 November 1977) is a Slovenian professional basketball coach and former player.

== Honors and awards ==
=== Krka Novo Mesto ===
- 3x Slovenian League Champion: (2000, 2003, 2011)
- EuroChallenge Champion: (2011)
- Slovenian Supercup : (2010)

=== Olimpija ===
- 2x Slovenian League Champion: (2005, 2006)
- 2x Slovenian Cup Champion: (2005, 2006)
- Slovenian Supercup : (2013)

=== Oostende ===
- 2x Belgian League Champion: (2012, 2013)
- 2x Belgian Cup Champion: (2010, 2013)

=== Šentjur ===
- Slovenian League Champion: (2015)
- Slovenian Supercup : (2015)

=== Individual ===
- 4x Slovenian League All-Star: (2001, 2004, 2005, 2015, 2016)
- Slovenian League Finals MVP: (2015)
