= 2020 FIBA Men's Olympic Qualifying Tournaments =

2020 FIBA Olympic Qualifying Tournaments
For Men

Tournament details
- Host country: Canada; Croatia; Lithuania; Serbia
- Dates: 29 June – 4 July 2021
- Teams: 23 (from 4 federations)
- Venues: 4 (in 4 host cities)

The 2020 FIBA Men's Olympic Qualifying Tournaments involved four basketball tournaments contested by 23 national teams, and the top teams earned a place in the 2020 Summer Olympics basketball tournament. They were originally scheduled to take place from 23 to 28 June 2020 but were postponed due to the COVID-19 pandemic, to 29 June to 4 July 2021.

== Hosts selection ==
The cities of Victoria, Split, Kaunas and Belgrade hosted the tournaments.

== Format ==
There were four qualifying tournaments, each producing a team which was qualified for the 2020 Summer Olympics. The format consisted of 24 national teams divided into four tournaments of six teams each, with the winning team from each event qualifying for the Olympics.

== Teams ==
The FIBA Olympic Qualifying Tournaments included the 16 best-placed non-qualified teams from the 2019 FIBA Basketball World Cup and the two highest-ranked countries per region in the FIBA World Ranking. On 19 September 2019, FIBA announced those teams, which are Angola and Senegal (Africa), Mexico and Uruguay (Americas), China and Korea (Asia-Oceania), and Croatia and Slovenia (Europe).

New Zealand initially qualified for the Olympic Qualifying Tournament by virtue of the 2019 FIBA Basketball World Cup. On 26 February 2021, Basketball New Zealand announced that they would pull out of the tournament. On the same day, FIBA announced that they would be replaced by the Philippines as the next-best team from the Asia-Oceania region in the FIBA World Rankings.

Senegal had been initially included in the Belgrade Tournament, but it was forced to withdraw before the start due to several COVID-19 positive cases, and not being replaced by any team, lowering the number of participants to 23.

FIBA Africa	FIBA Americas	FIBA Europe	FIBA Asia and FIBA Oceania
Tunisia	Brazil	Serbia	~~New Zealand~~
Angola (WC)	Venezuela	Czech Republic	South Korea (WC)
~~Senegal~~ (WC)	Puerto Rico	Poland	China (WC)
	Dominican Republic	Lithuania	Philippines (WC)
	Canada	Italy	
	Mexico (WC)	Greece	
	Uruguay (WC)	Russia	
		Germany	
Turkey
Croatia (WC)
Slovenia (WC)

== Draw ==
The draw for the Olympic qualifiers took place at The House of Basketball in Mies, Switzerland on 27 November 2019.

=== Seeding ===
The latest ranking before the draw served as the basis to determine the pots for the draw (seeding in brackets). In each tournament, group A consists of one team each from pots 1, 4 and 5, while group B consists of one team each from pots 2, 3 and 6.

Pot 1	Pot 2	Pot 3	Pot 4	Pot 5	Pot 6
Serbia (6); Greece (7); Lithuania (8); Russia (9)	Czech Republic (10); Brazil (11); Italy (12); Poland (13)	Croatia (14); Turkey (15); Slovenia (16); Puerto Rico (17)	Germany (18); Dominican Republic (19); Venezuela (20); Canada (21)	Mexico (25); China (26); South Korea (30); Philippines (31)	Angola (32); Tunisia (33); Senegal (35); Uruguay (43)

== Qualifying tournaments ==
=== Victoria ===
The tournament was held in Victoria, Canada.

==== Preliminary round ====
===== Group A =====
Pos	Team	Pld	W	L	PF	PA	PD	Pts	Qualification
1	Canada (H)	2	2	0	206	170	+36	4	Semi-finals
2	Greece	2	1	1	196	177	+19	3	Semi-finals
3	China	2	0	2	159	214	−55	2	

Source: FIBA
Rules for classification: 1) points; 2) head-to-head points; 3) head-to-head points difference; 4) head-to-head number of points scored.
(H) Hosts

===== Group B =====
Pos	Team	Pld	W	L	PF	PA	PD	Pts	Qualification
1	Turkey	2	2	0	182	156	+26	4	Semi-finals
2	Czech Republic	2	1	1	150	166	−16	3	Semi-finals
3	Uruguay	2	0	2	165	175	−10	2	

Source: FIBA
Rules for classification: 1) points; 2) head-to-head points; 3) head-to-head points difference; 4) head-to-head number of points scored.

==== Final round ====
Semi-finals
3 July
Canada	101
Czech Republic (OT)	103
3 July
Turkey	63
Greece	81

Final
4 July
Czech Republic	97
Greece	72

==== Final ranking ====
#	Team	W–L	Qualification
1	Czech Republic	3–1	Qualified for the Olympics
2	Greece	2–2	
3	Canada	2–1	
4	Turkey	2–1	
5	Uruguay	0–2	
6	China	0–2	

=== Split ===
The tournament was held in Split, Croatia.

==== Preliminary round ====
===== Group A =====
Pos	Team	Pld	W	L	PF	PA	PD	Pts	Qualification
1	Germany	2	2	0	151	143	+8	4	Semi-finals
2	Mexico	2	1	1	148	146	+2	3	Semi-finals
3	Russia	2	0	2	131	141	−10	2	

Source: FIBA
Rules for classification: 1) points; 2) head-to-head points; 3) head-to-head points difference; 4) head-to-head number of points scored.

===== Group B =====
Pos	Team	Pld	W	L	PF	PA	PD	Pts	Qualification
1	Brazil	2	2	0	177	124	+53	4	Semi-finals
2	Croatia (H)	2	1	1	142	164	−22	3	Semi-finals
3	Tunisia	2	0	2	127	158	−31	2	

Source: FIBA
Rules for classification: 1) points; 2) head-to-head points; 3) head-to-head points difference; 4) head-to-head number of points scored.
(H) Hosts

==== Final round ====
Semi-finals
3 July
Germany	86
Croatia	76
3 July
Brazil	102
Mexico	74

Final
4 July
Germany	75
Brazil	64

==== Final ranking ====
#	Team	W–L	Qualification
1	Germany	4–0	Qualified for the Olympics
2	Brazil	3–1	
3	Mexico	1–2	
4	Croatia	1–2	
5	Russia	0–2	
6	Tunisia	0–2	

=== Kaunas ===
The tournament was held in Kaunas, Lithuania.

==== Preliminary round ====
===== Group A =====
Pos	Team	Pld	W	L	PF	PA	PD	Pts	Qualification
1	Lithuania (H)	2	2	0	172	122	+50	4	Semi-finals
2	Venezuela	2	1	1	159	156	+3	3	Semi-finals
3	South Korea	2	0	2	137	190	−53	2	

Source: FIBA
Rules for classification: 1) points; 2) head-to-head points; 3) head-to-head points difference; 4) head-to-head number of points scored.
(H) Hosts

===== Group B =====
Pos	Team	Pld	W	L	PF	PA	PD	Pts	Qualification
1	Slovenia	2	2	0	230	145	+85	4	Semi-finals
2	Poland	2	1	1	160	176	−16	3	Semi-finals
3	Angola	2	0	2	132	201	−69	2	

Source: FIBA
Rules for classification: 1) points; 2) head-to-head points; 3) head-to-head points difference; 4) head-to-head number of points scored.

==== Final round ====
Semi-finals
3 July
Lithuania	88
Poland	69
3 July
Slovenia	98
Venezuela	70

Final
4 July
Lithuania	85
Slovenia	96

==== Final ranking ====
#	Team	W–L	Qualification
1	Slovenia	4–0	Qualified for the Olympics
2	Lithuania	3–1	
3	Venezuela	1–2	
4	Poland	1–2	
5	South Korea	0–2	
6	Angola	0–2	

=== Belgrade ===
The tournament was held in Belgrade, Serbia.

==== Preliminary round ====
===== Group A =====
Pos	Team	Pld	W	L	PF	PA	PD	Pts	Qualification
1	Serbia (H)	2	2	0	177	152	+25	4	Semi-finals
2	Dominican Republic	2	1	1	170	161	+9	3	Semi-finals
3	Philippines	2	0	2	143	177	−34	2	

Source: FIBA
Rules for classification: 1) points; 2) head-to-head points; 3) head-to-head points difference; 4) head-to-head number of points scored.
(H) Hosts

===== Group B =====
- FIBA did not publish any standings. Both teams qualified to the final round, with the winner playing Group A's runner-up.

Team 1	Score	Team 2
Italy	90–83	Puerto Rico

==== Final round ====
Semi-finals
3 July
Serbia	102
Puerto Rico	84
3 July
Italy	79
Dominican Republic	59

Final
4 July
Serbia	95
Italy	102

==== Final ranking ====
#	Team	W–L	Qualification
1	Italy	3–0	Qualified for the Olympics
2	Serbia	3–1	
3	Puerto Rico	0–2	
4	Dominican Republic	1–2	
5	Philippines	0–2	

== See also ==
- Basketball at the 2020 Summer Olympics
- 2020 FIBA Women's Olympic Qualifying Tournaments
