= Vlatko Čančar =

Slovenian basketball player (born 1997)

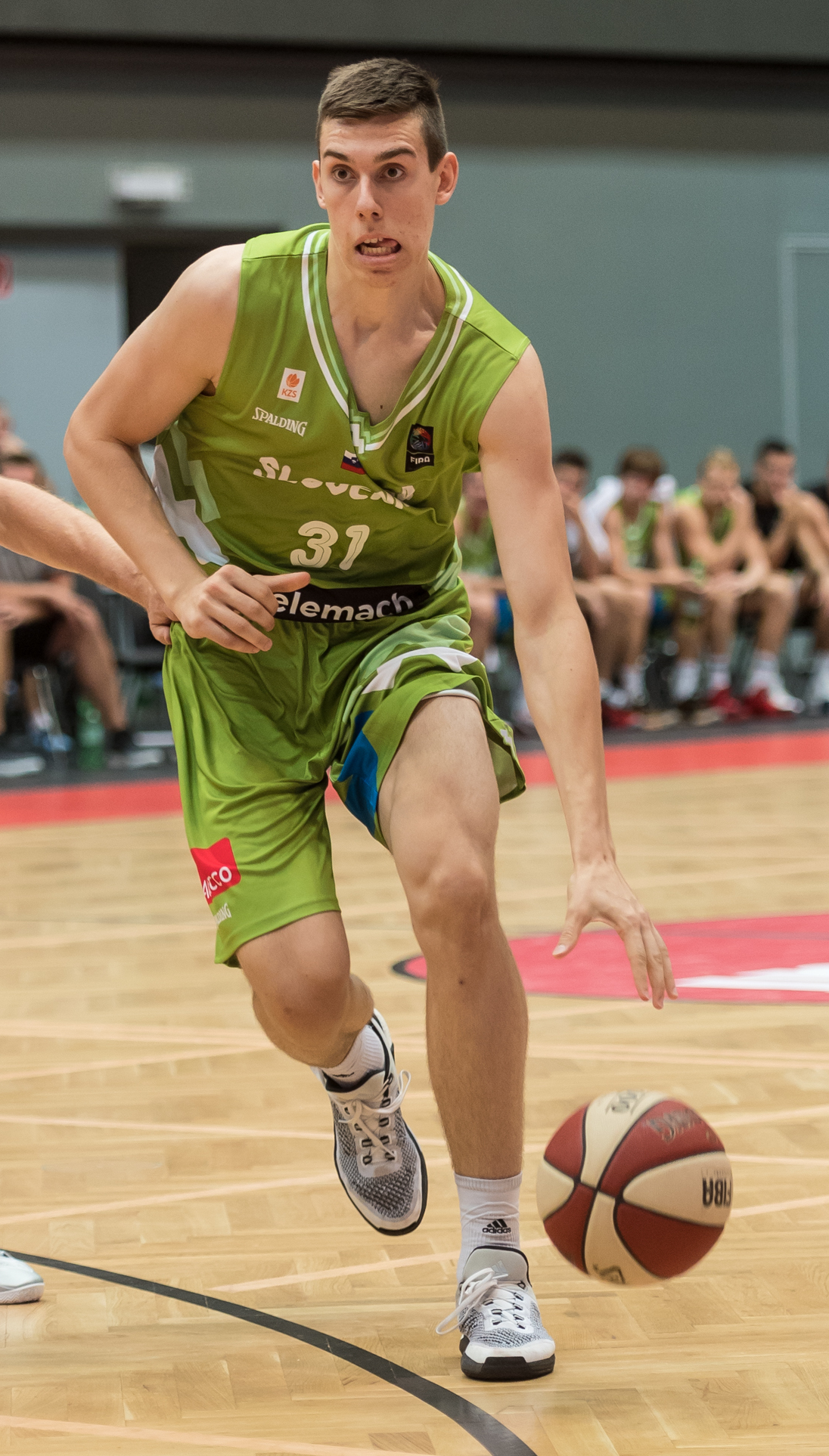
- Čančar with Slovenia in 2016

No. 31 – San Pablo Burgos
- Position: Small forward / power forward
- League: Liga ACB; EuroCup

Personal information
- Born: 10 April 1997 (age 29) Koper, Slovenia
- Listed height: 6 ft 8 in (2.03 m)
- Listed weight: 236 lb (107 kg)

Career information
- NBA draft: 2017: 2nd round, 49th overall pick
- Drafted by: Denver Nuggets
- Playing career: 2014–present

Career history
- 2014–2016: Union Olimpija
- 2014–2016: →LTH Castings
- 2016–2018: Mega Leks
- 2018: →San Pablo Burgos
- 2018–2019: San Pablo Burgos
- 2019–2025: Denver Nuggets
- 2019: →Erie BayHawks
- 2021: →Grand Rapids Gold
- 2025: Olimpia Milano
- 2026–present: San Pablo Burgos

Career highlights
- NBA champion (2023); ACB All-Young Players Team (2019); Italian Supercup winner (2025)
- Stats at NBA.com
- Stats at Basketball Reference
Medals
Men's basketball
Representing Slovenia
EuroBasket
Gold medal – first place	2017 Finland–Israel–Romania–Turkey

Vlatko Čančar (/ˈtʃɑːntʃɑːr/ CHAHN-char; born 10 April 1997) is a Slovenian professional basketball player for San Pablo Burgos of the Spanish Liga ACB and the EuroCup. Standing at 6 ft 8 in (2.03 m), he plays primarily as a small forward. He has previously played in the National Basketball Association (NBA) for the Denver Nuggets, winning the NBA Finals with them in 2023.

== Professional career ==
=== Union Olimpija (2015–2016) ===
On 16 April 2015, Čančar signed a five-year contract with Union Olimpija.

=== Mega Leks (2016–2018) ===
On 30 June 2016, Čančar left Olimpija and signed with Serbian team Mega Leks.

=== San Pablo Burgos (2018–2019) ===
On 13 March 2018, Čančar was loaned to the Spanish club San Pablo Burgos.

On 13 June 2018, Čančar renewed his contract with the club for an additional two seasons.

=== Denver Nuggets (2019–2025) ===
On 22 June 2017, Čančar was selected with the 49th overall pick in the 2017 NBA draft by the Denver Nuggets.

On 2 August 2019, Čančar signed his rookie contract with the Denver Nuggets.

On 13 May 2021, Čančar scored a career-high 14 points off the bench in a 114–103 win over the Minnesota Timberwolves.

On 3 January 2022, during a 89–103 loss to the Dallas Mavericks, Čančar suffered a right foot injury. Two days later, he was diagnosed with a fracture of his right fifth metatarsal. On 7 January, Čančar underwent surgery for the fracture and was ruled out for at least three months.

On 10 April, in the regular season finale, Čančar returned to the Nuggets and played a season high 24 minutes in an overtime loss to the Los Angeles Lakers. Čančar recorded 2 points, 8 rebounds, and 4 assists in his last regular season game.

On 7 July 2022, Čančar re-signed with the Nuggets on a three-year deal.

On 23 November 2022, Čančar scored a career high 20 points, along with 4 rebounds, 5 assists and 3 blocks in an overtime win against the Oklahoma City Thunder.

In June 2023, Čančar won his first NBA championship when the Nuggets defeated the Miami Heat in the 2023 NBA Finals. During the season, he played in 60 games, almost 15 minutes per game, and scored approximately five points per game. In the five-game NBA Finals, he played for 29 seconds.

On 9 July 2024, Čančar re-signed with the Nuggets.

=== Olimpia Milano (2025) ===
On July 17, 2025, Čančar signed with Olimpia Milano of the Italian Lega Basket Serie A (LBA) and the EuroLeague. On October 22, of the same year, Čančar and his team have a mutual agreement to terminate his contract. He only appeared in two EuroLeague games during the season, the result of a knee issue.

=== Return to San Pablo Burgos (2026–present) ===
On 21 July 2026, Čančar returned to San Pablo Burgos of the Liga ACB and the EuroCup. On 11 September, it was announced that Čančar had suffered a meniscus tear during a team practice that would require surgery.

== National team career ==
Čančar has been a member of the Slovenia national basketball team. He played with the team at EuroBasket 2017, where he won the gold medal with his country.

Čančar represented the Slovenian national basketball team at the 2020 Summer Olympics in Tokyo, Japan.

On 4 August 2023, during an exhibition game against Greece, Čančar suffered a torn ACL in his left knee. On 17 August 2023, he underwent surgery to reconstruct the ACL, and was ruled out indefinitely. He ultimately missed the entire 2023–24 NBA season.

== Career statistics ==
Legend
GP	Games played	GS	Games started	MPG	Minutes per game
FG%	Field goal percentage	3P%	3-point field goal percentage	FT%	Free throw percentage
RPG	Rebounds per game	APG	Assists per game	SPG	Steals per game
BPG	Blocks per game	PPG	Points per game	**Bold**	Career high
†	Won an NBA championship

=== NBA ===
==== Regular season ====
Year	Team	GP	GS	MPG	FG%	3P%	FT%	RPG	APG	SPG	BPG	PPG
2019–20	Denver	14	0	3.2	.400	.167	**1.000**	.7	.2	.1	.1	1.2
2020–21	Denver	41	1	6.9	.458	.273	.769	1.2	.3	.3	.0	2.1
2021–22	Denver	15	1	11.7	**.561**	**.583**	.643	2.1	1.1	.1	**.2**	4.1
2022–23^{†}	Denver	**60**	**9**	**14.8**	.476	.374	.927	2.1	**1.3**	**.4**	**.2**	**5.0**
2024–25	Denver	13	0	10.5	.385	.267	—	**2.5**	.7	.2	**.2**	1.8
Career		143	11	10.7	.472	.354	.847	1.8	.9	.3	.2	3.4

==== Playoffs ====
Year	Team	GP	GS	MPG	FG%	3P%	FT%	RPG	APG	SPG	BPG	PPG
2021	Denver	**5**	0	4.2	**1.000**	**1.000**	**.800**	.6	.2	**.2**	**.2**	2.2
2022	Denver	2	0	**4.5**	.667	.500	—	**1.0**	**.5**	.0	.0	**2.5**
2023^{†}	Denver	**5**	0	2.0	.000	.000	—	.6	.2	.0	.0	.0
2025	Denver	3	0	3.7	—	—	—	.7	.0	.0	.0	.0
Career		15	0	3.4	.455	.286	.800	.7	.2	.1	.1	1.1

== See also ==
- List of NBA drafted players from Serbia
- List of European basketball players in the United States
