= 2020 FIBA Men's Olympic Qualifying Tournaments – Kaunas =

2020 FIBA World Olympic Qualifying Tournament for Men
Kaunas, Lithuania

Tournament details
- Host country: Lithuania
- Dates: 29 June – 4 July
- Teams: 6
- Venue(s): 1 (in 1 host city)

Final positions
- Champions: Slovenia

Tournament statistics
- MVP: (Slovenia) Luka Dončić
- Top scorer: (South Korea) Ra Gun-ah (21.5)
- Top rebounds: (Lithuania) Jonas Valančiūnas (9.5)
- Top assists: (Slovenia) Luka Dončić (11.3)
- PPG (Team): Slovenia (106.0)
- RPG (Team): Slovenia (44.3)
- APG (Team): Slovenia (26.8)

Official website
- WOQT Lithuania

The 2020 FIBA Men's Olympic Qualifying Tournament in Kaunas was one of four 2020 FIBA Men's Olympic Qualifying Tournaments. The tournament was held in Kaunas, Lithuania. It was originally scheduled to take place from 23 to 28 June 2020 but was postponed due to the COVID-19 pandemic, to 29 June to 4 July 2021.

== Teams ==
Team	Qualification	Date of qualification	FIBA World Ranking
Lithuania	9th at the 2019 FIBA Basketball World Cup	15 September 2019	8th
Poland	8th at the 2019 FIBA Basketball World Cup	15 September 2019	13th
Slovenia	Wild card	19 September 2019	16th
Venezuela	14th at the 2019 FIBA Basketball World Cup	15 September 2019	20th
South Korea	Wild card	19 September 2019	30th
Angola	Wild card	19 September 2019	33rd

== Venue ==
Kaunas	2020 FIBA Men's Olympic Qualifying Tournaments – Kaunas (Lithuania)
Žalgiris Arena	2020 FIBA Men's Olympic Qualifying Tournaments – Kaunas (Lithuania)
Capacity: 15,415	2020 FIBA Men's Olympic Qualifying Tournaments – Kaunas (Lithuania)

== Preliminary round ==
All times are local (UTC+3).

=== Group A ===
Pos	Team	Pld	W	L	PF	PA	PD	Pts	Qualification
1	Lithuania (H)	2	2	0	172	122	+50	4	Semi-finals
2	Venezuela	2	1	1	159	156	+3	3	Semi-finals
3	South Korea	2	0	2	137	190	−53	2	

Source: FIBA
Rules for classification: 1) points; 2) head-to-head points; 3) head-to-head points difference; 4) head-to-head number of points scored.
(H) Hosts

29 June 2021
19:30

Boxscore

Lithuania	76–65	Venezuela
Scoring by quarter: 11–10, 25–18, 19–16, 21–21
Pts: Valančiūnas 20; Rebs: Valančiūnas 11; Asts: Jokubaitis 5		Pts: Cubillán 11; Rebs: Carrera 6 Asts: Vargas 4

Žalgiris Arena, Kaunas
Attendance: 2,892
Referees: Roberto Vázquez (PUR), Saverio Lanzarini (ITA), Yevgeniy Mikheyev (KAZ)

30 June 2021
19:30

Boxscore

Venezuela	94–80	South Korea
Scoring by quarter: 27–18, 29–20, 14–28, 24–14
Pts: Guillent 17; Rebs: Carrera 12; Asts: four players 4		Pts: Lee H. 18; Rebs: Ra 6 Asts: Lee D. 8

Žalgiris Arena, Kaunas
Attendance: 245
Referees: Juan Fernández (ARG), Yu Jung (TPE), Scott Beker (AUS)

1 July 2021
19:30

Boxscore

South Korea	57–96	Lithuania
Scoring by quarter: 16–28, 18–21, 9–27, 14–20
Pts: Ra 26; Rebs: Ra 8 Asts: Lee D., Lee H. 4		Pts: Valančiūnas 15; Rebs: Valančiūnas 13; Asts: Kalnietis 9

Žalgiris Arena, Kaunas
Attendance: 3,903
Referees: Roberto Vázquez (PUR), Saverio Lanzarini (ITA), Samir Abaakil (MAR)

=== Group B ===
Pos	Team	Pld	W	L	PF	PA	PD	Pts	Qualification
1	Slovenia	2	2	0	230	145	+85	4	Semi-finals
2	Poland	2	1	1	160	176	−16	3	Semi-finals
3	Angola	2	0	2	132	201	−69	2	

Source: FIBA
Rules for classification: 1) points; 2) head-to-head points; 3) head-to-head points difference; 4) head-to-head number of points scored.

29 June 2021
16:30

Boxscore

Poland	83–64	Angola
Scoring by quarter: 24–19, 19–12, 19–14, 21–19
Pts: Ponitka 22; Rebs: four players 4 Asts: Slaughter 6		Pts: Moreira 27; Rebs: Moreira 7 Asts: Bastos 4

Žalgiris Arena, Kaunas
Attendance: 311
Referees: Juan Fernández (ARG), Manuel Mazzoni (ITA), Scott Beker (AUS)

30 June 2021
16:30

Boxscore

Angola	68–118	Slovenia
Scoring by quarter: 9–33, 21–31, 14–26, 24–28
Pts: Moreira 15; Rebs: Gakou, Moreira 6 Asts: Ndoniema 3		Pts: Dragić 16; Rebs: Dimec, Dončić 6 Asts: Dončić 9

Žalgiris Arena, Kaunas
Attendance: 262
Referees: Roberto Vázquez (PUR), Manuel Mazzoni (ITA), Samir Abaakil (MAR)

1 July 2021
16:30

Boxscore

Slovenia	112–77	Poland
Scoring by quarter: 29–26, 34–20, 20–14, 29–17
Pts: Dončić 18; Rebs: Tobey 10; Asts: Dončić 10		Pts: Ponitka 16; Rebs: Ponitka 7 Asts: Slaughter 5

Žalgiris Arena, Kaunas
Attendance: 2,115
Referees: Juan Fernández (ARG), Yu Jung (TPE), Yevgeniy Mikheyev (KAZ)

== Final round ==
Semi-finals
3 July
Lithuania	88
Poland	69
3 July
Slovenia	98
Venezuela	70

Final
4 July
Lithuania	85
Slovenia	96

=== Semi-finals ===
3 July 2021
16:30

Boxscore

Slovenia	98–70	Venezuela
Scoring by quarter: 26–21, 22–20, 23–14, 27–15
Pts: Tobey 27; Rebs: Tobey 12; Asts: Dončić 13		Pts: Carrera, Chourio 16; Rebs: Carrera 6 Asts: Guillent, Vargas 3

Žalgiris Arena, Kaunas
Attendance: 3,128
Referees: Roberto Vázquez (PUR), Yu Jung (TPE), Saverio Lanzarini (ITA)

3 July 2021
19:30

Boxscore

Lithuania	88–69	Poland
Scoring by quarter: 23–19, 23–26, 16–6, 26–18
Pts: Sabonis 17; Rebs: Sabonis, Valančiūnas 8 Asts: Kalnietis 4		Pts: Slaughter 19; Rebs: Balcerowski, Hrycaniuk 3 Asts: four players 3

Žalgiris Arena, Kaunas
Attendance: 5,353
Referees: Juan Fernández (ARG), Manuel Mazzoni (ITA), Scott Beker (AUS)

=== Final ===
4 July 2021
19:30

Boxscore

Lithuania	85–96	Slovenia
Scoring by quarter: 24–28, 28–24, 17–28, 16–16
Pts: three players 14; Rebs: Sabonis, Valančiūnas 6 Asts: Grigonis 6		Pts: Dončić 31; Rebs: Dončić 11; Asts: Dončić 13

Žalgiris Arena, Kaunas
Attendance: 11,562
Referees: Roberto Vázquez (PUR), Juan Fernández (ARG), Manuel Mazzoni (ITA)

== Final ranking ==
#	Team	W–L	Qualification
1	Slovenia	4–0	Qualified for the Olympics
2	Lithuania	3–1	
3	Venezuela	1–2	
4	Poland	1–2	
5	South Korea	0–2	
6	Angola	0–2	
