= Papapetrou =

Papapetrou is a surname. Notable people with the surname include:

- Achilles Papapetrou (1907–1997), Greek theoretical physicist
- Argiris Papapetrou (born 1965), Greek basketball player and coach
- Georgios Papapetrou (born 1991), Greek basketball player
- Ioannis Papapetrou (born 1994), Greek basketball player
- Michalis Papapetrou (born 1947), Cypriot politician and diplomat
- Periklis Papapetrou (1947–2012), Greek architect and politician
- Polixeni Papapetrou (1960–2018), Australian photographer

== See also ==
- Majumdar–Papapetrou solution
- Mathisson–Papapetrou–Dixon equations
- Weyl–Lewis–Papapetrou coordinates
