= Józef Lubański =

Polish theoretical physicist

- Born: 1914
- Died: December 8, 1946 (aged 31–32)
- Education: Vilnius University
- Known for: Pauli–Lubanski pseudovector
- Scientific career
- Fields: Theoretical physics Relativistic quantum mechanics
- Workplaces: Leiden University; Delft University of Technology

Józef Kazimierz Lubański (1914 – 8 December 1946) was a Polish theoretical physicist. He developed the Pauli–Lubanski pseudovector in relativistic quantum mechanics.

== Life and works ==
Lubanski obtained the degree of magister philosophies at Wilna in 1937. He then worked for two years as an assistant in theoretical physics at Polish universities, and obtained a grant in order to travel to the Netherlands and to work under Hans Kramers at Leiden University. His original intention was to go to Copenhagen in the following year, although the Second World War prevented this.

Lubanski worked with Léon Rosenfeld at Utrecht, and dating from this period he wrote a number of papers on the properties of mesons mainly in the journal Physica, one in the Arkiv för matematik, astronomi och fysik.

Around 1937 in Kraków, he collaborated with Myron Mathisson and Jan Weyssenhoff's colleagues on the motion of spinning particles in linearized gravitational fields according to general relativity, and under Mathisson's lead, published a paper on the derivation of the Mathisson–Papapetrou–Dixon equations.

He also worked at the laboratory of Delft University of Technology in aerodynamics and hydrodynamics.

== See also ==
- Relativistic wave equations
