= 2018–19 Real Madrid Baloncesto season =

Real Madrid
2018–19 season
- Chairman: Florentino Pérez
- Head coach: Pablo Laso
- Arena: WiZink Center
- Liga ACB: Winners (defeated Barcelona Lassa)
- EuroLeague: 3rd
- Copa del Rey: Runners-up (lost to Barcelona Lassa)
- Supercopa: Winners (defeated Kirolbet Baskonia)
- Highest home attendance: 12,749 (vs CSKA Moscow 29 November 2018)
- Lowest home attendance: 7,804 (vs Herbalife Gran Canaria 9 December 2018)
- Average home attendance: 9,052
Home	Away

The 2018–19 season was Real Madrid's 88th season in existence, their 36th consecutive season in the top flight of Spanish basketball and 12th consecutive season in the top flight of European basketball.

== Players ==
=== Squad information ===
Note: Flags indicate national team eligibility at FIBA-sanctioned events. Players may hold other non-FIBA nationalities not displayed.

Real Madrid roster
Players
Coaches

Pos.	No.	Nat.	Name	Ht.	Age
C	14	(Mexico)	Ayón, Gustavo	2.07 m (6 ft 9 in)	34 – 1 April 1985
PG	7	(Argentina)	Campazzo, Facundo	1.81 m (5 ft 11 in)	28 – 23 March 1991
SG	20	(Azerbaijan)	Carroll, Jaycee	1.88 m (6 ft 2 in)	36 – 16 April 1983
G/F	1	(France)	Causeur, Fabien	1.95 m (6 ft 5 in)	32 – 16 June 1987
SF	24	(Argentina)	Deck, Gabriel	1.98 m (6 ft 6 in)	24 – 8 February 1995
G/F	5	(Spain)	Fernández, Rudy	1.96 m (6 ft 5 in)	34 – 4 April 1985
C	32	(Serbia)	Kuzmić, Ognjen	2.14 m (7 ft 0 in)	29 – 16 May 1990
G	23	(Spain)	Llull, Sergio	1.90 m (6 ft 3 in)	31 – 15 November 1987
PG	19	(Sweden)	Pantzar, Melwin	1.90 m (6 ft 3 in)	19 – 10 April 2000
SG	25	(Slovenia)	Prepelič, Klemen	1.91 m (6 ft 3 in)	26 – 20 October 1992
PF	3	(Slovenia)	Randolph, Anthony	2.11 m (6 ft 11 in)	29 – 15 July 1989
F/C	9	(Spain)	Reyes, Felipe (C)	2.04 m (6 ft 8 in)	39 – 16 March 1980
C	22	(Cape Verde)	Tavares, Edy	2.20 m (7 ft 3 in)	27 – 22 March 1992
G/F	44	(Sweden)	Taylor, Jeffery	2.01 m (6 ft 7 in)	30 – 23 May 1989
PF	33	(United States)	Thompkins, Trey	2.08 m (6 ft 10 in)	29 – 29 May 1990
SF	16	(Spain)	Yusta, Santiago	2.00 m (6 ft 7 in)	22 – 28 April 1997

Head coach

- (Spain) Pablo Laso

Legend

- (C) Team captain
- Injured

- Roster
Updated: August 8, 2018

=== Depth chart ===
Pos.	Starting 5	Bench 1	Bench 2	Bench 3
C	Edy Tavares	Gustavo Ayón	Ognjen Kuzmić
PF	Anthony Randolph	Trey Thompkins	Felipe Reyes
SF	Jeffery Taylor	Gabriel Deck	Fabien Causeur	Santiago Yusta
SG	Rudy Fernández	Jaycee Carroll	Klemen Prepelič
PG	Facundo Campazzo	Sergio Llull	Melwin Pantzar

Colours: Blue = homegrown player; Red = non–FIBA Europe player

=== Players in ===
No.	Pos.	Nat.	Name	Age	Moving from		Type	Ends	Transfer fee	Date	Source
	C	(Brazil)	Felipe dos Anjos	20	San Pablo Burgos	(Spain)	Loan return		Free		
	C	(Spain)	Sebas Saiz	23	San Pablo Burgos	(Spain)	Loan return		Free		
	PF	(Spain)	Álex Suárez	24	Tecnyconta Zaragoza	(Spain)	Loan return	2018	Free		
	C	(Brazil)	Augusto Lima	26	UCAM Murcia	(Spain)	Loan return	2018	Free		
25	SG	(Slovenia)	Klemen Prepelič	26	Levallois Metropolitans	(France)	End of contract	2020	Free	9 July 2018	
24	SF	(Argentina)	Gabriel Deck	23	San Lorenzo	(Argentina)	Transfer	2021	€250,000	19 July 2018	

=== Players out ===
No.	Pos.	Nat.	Name	Age	Moving to		Type	Transfer fee	Date	Source
7	PG	(Slovenia)	Luka Dončić	19	Dallas Mavericks	(United States)	Transfer	€2,000,000	29 June 2018	
2	PG	(United States)	Chasson Randle	25	Free agent		End of contract	Free		
	C	(Spain)	Sebas Saiz	23	Iberostar Tenerife	(Spain)	Loan	Free	13 July 2018	
	PF	(Spain)	Álex Suárez	24	Benfica	(Portugal)	End of contract	Free	31 July 2018	
	C	(Brazil)	Augusto Lima	26	Cedevita	(Croatia)	End of contract	Free	31 July 2018	
6	SF	(Montenegro)	Dino Radončić	19	UCAM Murcia	(Spain)	Loan	Free	8 August 2018	
	C	(Brazil)	Felipe dos Anjos	20	Club Melilla Baloncesto	(Spain)	Loan	Free	9 October 2018	

== Club ==
=== Technical staff ===
Position	Staff
Head coach	Pablo Laso
Assistant coach	Jesús Mateo; Francisco Redondo; Isidoro Calín
Fitness trainer	Juan Trapero

Source: Real Madrid

=== Kit ===
Supplier: Adidas / Sponsor: Universidad Europea

Home	Away

== Pre-season and friendlies ==
Win Loss

4 September 2018 Training	Real Madrid (Spain)	79–80	(France) ASVEL Basket	Valdebebas
		[Boxscore]		Arena: Ciudad Real Madrid

8 September 2018 Training	San Pablo Burgos	85–98	Real Madrid	Burgos
19:00 (CEST)	'Scoring by quarter: 20-24, 22-24, 29-22, 14-28
	Pts: Thompson 15; Rebs: Huskić, Čančar 8 Asts: Alex Barrera 4 PIR: Thompson 15	Boxscore	Pts: Ayón 21; Rebs: Randolph 8 Asts: Llull 4 PIR: Ayón 22	Arena: Coliseum Burgos; Attendance: 6,500; Referees: Carlos Peruga Embid, Martín Caballero Madrid, Andrés Fernández Sánchez

14 September 2018 Torneo Costa del Sol	Real Madrid (Spain)	80–69	(Greece) Olympiacos	Manilva
20:00 (CEST)	Scoring by quarter: 14-23, 24-20, 24-14, 18-12
	Pts: Thompkins 14		Pts: Toupane 17	Arena: Ciudad Deportiva de Sabinillas

15 September 2019 Torneo Costa del Sol	Unicaja	47–96	Real Madrid	Marbella
20:00 (CEST)	Scoring by quarter: 12-27, 13-27, 14-24, 8-18
	Pts: Wiltjer 17		Pts: Carroll 13	Arena: Pabellón municipal Carlos Cabeza

== Competitions ==
=== Overview ===
Competition	First match	Last match	Starting round	Final position	Record							
Competition	First match	Last match	Starting round	Final position	Pld	W	D	L	PF	PA	PD	Win %
Liga ACB	30 September 2018	21 June 2019	Matchday 1	Winner	42	35	0	7	3,789	3,337	+452	83.33
EuroLeague	11 October 2018	19 May 2019	Matchday 1	3rd	35	26	0	9	3,004	2,729	+275	74.29
Copa del Rey	15 February 2019	17 February 2019	Quarterfinals	Runner-up	3	2	0	1	280	238	+42	66.67
Supercopa de España	21 September 2018	22 September 2018	Semi-Final	Winners	2	2	0	0	161	134	+27	100.00
Total					82	65	0	17	7,234	6,438	+796	79.27

Last updated: 22 June 2019
Source: Competitions

=== Liga ACB ===
==== League table ====
Pos	Team	Pld	W	L	PF	PA	PD	Qualification or relegation
1	Real Madrid	34	28	6	3026	2679	+347	Qualification to playoffs
2	Barça Lassa	34	27	7	2948	2590	+358	Qualification to playoffs
3	Kirolbet Baskonia	34	26	8	2927	2549	+378	Qualification to playoffs
4	Valencia Basket	34	23	11	2793	2673	+120	Qualification to playoffs
5	Unicaja	34	21	13	2843	2773	+70	Qualification to playoffs

Source: ACB

==== Results summary ====
Overall						Home					Away				
Pld	W	L	PF	PA	PD	W	L	PF	PA	PD	W	L	PF	PA	PD
34	28	6	3026	2679	+347	16	2	1551	1334	+217	12	4	1475	1345	+130

Last updated: 27 May 2019.
Source: Competitive matches

==== Results by round ====
Round	1	2	3	4	5	6	7	8	9	10	11	12	13	14	15	16	17	18	19	20	21	22	23	24	25	26	27	28	29	30	31	32	33	34
Ground	H	A	H	H	A	H	H	A	H	A	H	A	H	A	A	H	A	H	A	H	A	A	H	H	A	A	H	A	H	A	H	A	H	A
Result	W	W	W	W	W	W	L	W	W	L	W	L	W	W	L	W	W	W	L	W	W	W	W	L	W	W	W	W	W	W	W	W	W	W
Position	4	1	1	2	2	1	2	2	1	3	3	3	3	2	3	3	2	2	3	2	2	2	2	2	2	2	2	2	2	2	1	1	1	1

Last updated: 11 May 2019.
Source: Competitive matches
Ground: A = Away; H = Home; R = Rest. Result: L = Loss; W = Win; R = Rest; P = Postponed.

==== Matches ====
Win Loss

30 September 2018 1	Real Madrid	88–73	Iberostar Tenerife	Madrid
19:15 (CEST)	Scoring by quarter: 23-14, 17-21, 25-20, 23-18
	Pts: Randolph 13; Rebs: Ayón 17; Asts: Sergio Llull 5 PIR: Reyes, Ayón 16	Boxscore	Pts: Staiger 11; Rebs: Saiz 7 Asts: Bassas 8 PIR: Saiz 13	Arena: WiZink Center; Attendance: 8,791; Referees: Jiménez Trujillo, Jordi Aliaga, Alfonso Olivares

5 October 2018 2	Valencia	70–88	Real Madrid	Valencia
21:30 (CEST)	Scoring by quarter: 26-28, 15-17, 5-21, 24-22
	Pts: Dubljević 15; Rebs: Dubljević 9 Asts: Van Rossom 3 PIR: Doornekamp 16	Boxscore	Pts: Llull 17; Rebs: Randolph 9 Asts: Campazzo 9 PIR: Llull, Randolph 21	Arena: Fuente de San Luis; Attendance: 7,782; Referees: Antonio Conde, Oscar Perea, Jacobo Rial

7 October 2018 3	Real Madrid	89–82	Unicaja	Madrid
19:15 (CEST)	Scoring by quarter: 21-15, 27-21, 14-28, 27-18
	Pts: Tavares 14; Rebs: Tavares 11; Asts: Llull 7 PIR: Tavares 27	Boxscore	Pts: Milosavljević 15; Rebs: Lessort 9 Asts: Díaz 6 PIR: Shermadini 15	Arena: WiZink Center; Attendance: 8,217; Referees: Miguel Angel Pérez Pérez, Luis Miguel Castillo, Martín Caballero

14 October 2018 4	Real Madrid	92–69	Divina Seguros Joventut	Madrid
12:30 (CEST)	Scoring by quarter: 22-23, 22-16, 21-21, 27-9
	Pts: Campazzo, Deck 15; Rebs: Tavares 13; Asts: Campazzo 5 PIR: Deck 22	Boxscore	Pts: Dimitrijević 15; Rebs: Birgander 13; Asts: Laprovíttola 5 PIR: Birgander 16	Arena: WiZink Center; Attendance: 8,279; Referees: Carlos Peruga, Francisco J. Araña, Carlos Merino

21 October 2018 5	Monbus Obradoiro	73–86	Real Madrid	Santiago de Compostela
17:00 (CEST)	Scoring by quarter: 19-26, 17-27, 16-18, 21-15
	Pts: Obst 17; Rebs: Brodziansky 6 Asts: Pepe Pozas 5 PIR: Obst, Brodziansky 19	Boxscore	Pts: Reyes 12; Rebs: Yusta 6 Asts: Campazzo 6 PIR: 3 Players 13	Arena: Multiusos Fontes do Sar; Referees: J.C García González, Jordi Aliaga, Javier Torres

28 October 2018 6	Real Madrid	90–77	San Pablo Burgos	Madrid
12:30 (CEST)	Scoring by quarter: 21-19, 21-17, 28-22, 20-19
	Pts: Llull 19; Rebs: Kuzmić 7 Asts: Llull 4 PIR: Llull 24	Boxscore	Pts: Čančar 24; Rebs: 3 Players 5 Asts: 6 Players 1 PIR: Čančar 23	Arena: WiZink Center; Attendance: 8,529; Referees: Pérez Pizarro, Jorge Martínez, Martín Caballero

4 November 2018 7	Real Madrid	105–107	MoraBanc Andorra	Madrid
17:00 (CEST)	Scoring by quarter: 26-33, 32-26, 26-33, 21-15
	Pts: Carroll 32; Rebs: Reyes 7 Asts: Campazzo 7 PIR: Carroll 26	Boxscore	Pts: Ennis, Vitali 17; Rebs: Stević 5 Asts: Albicy 9 PIR: Vitali 19	Arena: WiZink Center; Attendance: 8083; Referees: Carlos Cortés, J.R. García Ortiz, Rafael Serrano

11 November 2018 8	Montakit Fuenlabrada	80–95	Real Madrid	Fuenlabrada
19:15 (CEST)	Scoring by quarter: 21-26, 22-20, 20-31, 17-18
	Pts: Popović 16; Rebs: Clark 6 Asts: Popović 3 PIR: Popović 15	Boxscore	Pts: Llull 17; Rebs: Tavares 8 Asts: Campazzo 5 PIR: Tavares 23	Arena: Fernando Martín; Attendance: 4,940; Referees: J.C García González, Juan de Dios Oyón, Esperanza Mendoza

18 November 2018 9	Real Madrid	104–71	Delteco GBC	Madrid
12:30 (CEST)	Scoring by quarter: 28-18, 28-13, 23-16, 25-24
	Pts: Prepelič, Taylor 14; Rebs: Usman Garuba 6 Asts: Causeur, Campazzo 5 PIR: Campazzo 21	Boxscore	Pts: Bobrov, Sanadze 15; Rebs: Sanadze 7 Asts: Daniel Pérez 4 PIR: Sanadze 11	Arena: WiZink Center; Attendance: 8,167; Referees: Fernando Calatrava, Vicente Bultó, Sanchez Mohedas

25 November 2018 10	FC Barcelona Lassa	86–69	Real Madrid	Barcelona
19:30 (CEST)	Scoring by quarter: 20-19, 19-17, 24-23, 23-10
	Pts: Kuric 16; Rebs: Séraphin, Singleton 8 Asts: Pangos 4 PIR: Kuric 14	Boxscore	Pts: Carroll 12; Rebs: Tavares 7 Asts: Campazzo 7 PIR: Tavares 16	Arena: Palau Blaugrana; Attendance: 7,159; Referees: Daniel Hierrezuelo, Sergio Manuel, A. Sánchez Sixto

9 December 2018 11	Real Madrid	87–63	Herbalife Gran Canaria	Madrid
17:00 (CEST)	Scoring by quarter: 17-20, 23-11, 25-15, 22-17
	Pts: Thompkins 19; Rebs: Reyes 9 Asts: Campazzo, Taylor 5 PIR: Thompkins 17	Boxscore	Pts: Strawberry 11; Rebs: Pasečņiks 8 Asts: five players 2 PIR: Oliver, Pasečņiks 8	Arena: WiZink Center; Attendance: 7,601; Referees: E. Pérez Pizarro, Francisco J. Araña, Alberto Baena

16 December 2018 12	Cafés Candelas Breogán	84–71	Real Madrid	Lugo
17:00 (CEST)	Scoring by quarter: 20-21, -25-13, 25-13, 14-24
	Pts: Johan Löfberg, Arco 13; Rebs: Vidal 8 Asts: Cvetković 4 PIR: Vidal, Brown 13	Boxscore	Pts: Sergio Llull, Prepelič 14; Rebs: Tavares 10; Asts: Llull 5 PIR: Tavares 15	Arena: Pazo dos Deportes; Attendance: 5,130; Referees: Fernando Calatrava Cuevas, Vicente Bultó, Iyán González

23 December 2018 13	Real Madrid	80–74	UCAM Murcia	Madrid
17:00 (CEST)	Scoring by quarter: 18-8, 24-22, 16-26, 22-18
	Pts: Thompkins 22; Rebs: Tavares 6 Asts: Reyes, Llull 3 PIR: Thompkins 24	Boxscore	Pts: Booker 18; Rebs: Soko 6 Asts: Oleson 3 PIR: Booker 18	Arena: WiZink Center; Attendance: 8,702; Referees: Miguel Ángel Pérez Pérez, Luis Miguel Castillo Larroca, Raúl Zamorano

30 December 2018 14	Kirolbet Baskonia	74–91	Real Madrid	Vitoria-Gasteiz
19:30 (CEST)	Scoring by quarter: 12-26, 23-21, 13-27, 26-17
	Pts: Huertas 24; Rebs: Janning, Shengelia 5 Asts: Huertas 3 PIR: Huertas 21	Boxscore	Pts: Thompkins 19; Rebs: Tavares 10; Asts: Campazzo 10; PIR: Campazzo 26	Arena: Fernando Buesa Arena; Attendance: 15,544; Referees: Antonio Conde, Jordi Aliaga, Jorge Martínez

6 January 2019 15	Movistar Estudiantes	93–88	Real Madrid	Madrid
19:30 (CEST)	Scoring by quarter: 25-25, 21-24, 20-15, 27-24
	Pts: Gentile 25; Rebs: Whittington 6 Asts: Cook 9 PIR: Gentile 19		Pts: Llull 18; Rebs: Reyes 8 Asts: Ayón 6 PIR: Ayón 22	Arena: WiZink Center; Attendance: 12,089; Referees: Carlos Cortés, Oscar Perea, Sanchez Mohedas

13 January 2019 16	Real Madrid	98–96	Tecnyconta Zaragoza	Madrid
12:30 (CEST)	Scoring by quarter: 31-31, 22-21, 23-22, 22-22
	Pts: Ayón 20; Rebs: Ayón 12; Asts: Fernández 5 PIR: Ayón 31	Boxscore	Pts: Seibutis 19; Rebs: Martín, Radović 6 Asts: McCalebb 7 PIR: Okoye, Seibutis 18	Arena: WiZink Center; Attendance: 8,277; Referees: J.A. Martín Bertrán, Juan de Dios Oyón, Iyán González

20 January 2019 17	Baxi Manresa	78–83	Real Madrid	Manresa
17:00 (CEST)	Scoring by quarter: 22-22, 22-18, 15-23, 19-20
	Pts: Fisher, Toolson 14; Rebs: Fisher, Dragović 4 Asts: Gabriel Lundberg 6 PIR: Fisher 19	Boxscore	Pts: Causeur 17; Rebs: Tavares 6 Asts: Campazzo 6 PIR: Thompkins 20	Arena: Nou Congost; Attendance: 5,000; Referees: M.A. Pérez Pérez, Jordi Aliaga, Raúl Zamorano

27 January 2019 18	Real Madrid	89–79	Montakit Fuenlabrada	Madrid
12:30 (CEST)	Scoring by quarter: 12-27, 31-13, 25-19, 21-20
	Pts: Llull 21; Rebs: Ayón 7 Asts: Ayón 5 PIR: Llull 24	Boxscore	Pts: Eyenga 19; Rebs: Eyenga 7 Asts: Popović 5 PIR: Eyenga 21	Arena: WiZink Center; Attendance: 8,389; Referees: J.C García González, Oscar Perea, Carlos Merino

3 February 2019 19	Unicaja	103–102(OT)	Real Madrid	Málaga
19:30 (CEST)	Scoring by quarter: 19-27, 22-30, 28-19, 26-19, Overtime: 8-7
	Pts: J. Fernández 27; Rebs: Shermadini 10; Asts: J. Fernández 9 PIR: J. Fernández 34	Boxscore	Pts: R. Fernández 25; Rebs: Ayón 10; Asts: Campazzo 11; PIR: R. Fernández 30	Arena: Martín Carpena; Attendance: 10,028; Referees: Jiménez Trujillo, Sergio Manuel, Alberto Baena

10 February 2019 20	Real Madrid	82–76	Kirolbet Baskonia	Madrid
19:30 (CEST)	Scoring by quarter: 15-19, 22-18, 20-15, 25-24
	Pts: Randolph 18; Rebs: Ayón 7 Asts: Campazzo 6 PIR: Randolph 22	Boxscore	Pts: Poirier 12; Rebs: Shields 5 Asts: Vildoza 8 PIR: Vildoza 16	Arena: WiZink Center; Attendance: 9,701; Referees: Daniel Hierrezuelo, Vicente Bultó, Rafael Serrano

3 March 2019 21	MoraBanc Andorra	66–87	Real Madrid	Andorra la Vella
12:30 (CEST)	Scoring by quarter: 19-24, 12-26, 12-15, 23-22
	Pts: Ennis 13; Rebs: Diagne, Upshaw 7 Asts: Albicy 5 PIR: Diagne 19	Boxscore	Pts: Carroll 15; Rebs: Tavares 10; Asts: Ayón 4 PIR: Carroll 22	Arena: M.I. Govern Andorra; Attendance: 4,500; Referees: E. Pérez Pizarro, Jorge Martínez, Arnau Padrós

9 March 2019 22	Divina Seguros Joventut	74–83	Real Madrid	Badalona
18:15 (CEST)	Scoring by quarter: 17-22, 19-21, 12-17, 26-23
	Pts: Laprovíttola 23; Rebs: López-Arostegui, Todorović, Harangody 5 Asts: Laprovíttola 10; PIR: Laprovíttola 28	Boxscore	Pts: Fernández 14; Rebs: Tavares 10; Asts: Llull 6 PIR: Fernández, Tavares 16	Arena: Palau Municipal d'Esports; Attendance: 9,912; Referees: J.A. Martín Bertrán, Francisco J. Araña, Javier Torres

17 March 2019 23	Real Madrid	91–57	Baxi Manresa	Madrid
12:30 (CEST)	Scoring by quarter: 29-13, 17-25, 23-6, 22-13
	Pts: Yusta 17; Rebs: Thompkins 7 Asts: Campazzo 5 PIR: Yusta 18	Boxscore	Pts: Murphy 9 Rebs: Yankuba Sima 7 Asts: Álvaro Muñoz 3 PIR: Álvaro Muñoz 10	Arena: WiZink Center; Attendance: 8,572; Referees: Carlos Peruga, Martín Caballero, Esperanza Mendoza

24 March 2019 24	Real Madrid	76–82	FC Barcelona Lassa	Madrid
19:30 (CEST)	Scoring by quarter: 17-17, 23-28, 17-17, 19-20
	Pts: Carroll 15; Rebs: Randolph, Tavares 7 Asts: Randolph, Campazzo, Ayón 3 PIR: Randolph 17	Boxscore	Pts: Thomas Heurtel 15; Rebs: Pierre Oriola, Tomić 6 Asts: Tomić 7 PIR: Pierre Oriola, Claver 16	Arena: WiZink Center; Attendance: 12,120; Referees: Antonio Conde, Fernando Calatrava Cuevas, A. Sánchez Sixto

31 March 2019 25	Iberostar Tenerife	82–91	Real Madrid	San Cristóbal de La Laguna
19:30 (CEST)	Scoring by quarter: 22-22, 18-27, 19-26, 23-16
	Pts: Abromaitis 19; Rebs: Abromaitis, Jõesaar 5 Asts: Bassas 11; PIR: Abromaitis 25	Boxscore	Pts: Thompkins 14; Rebs: Tavares 8 Asts: Llull 5 PIR: Fernández 25	Arena: Santiago Martín; Attendance: 5,183; Referees: Daniel Hierrezuelo, Sergio Manuel, Raúl Zamorano

7 April 2019 26	Herbalife Gran Canaria	71–77	Real Madrid	Las Palmas
19:30 (CEST)	Scoring by quarter: 18-14, 17-13, 14-24, 22-26
	Pts: Hannah 19; Rebs: Tillie 5 Asts: Hannah 5 PIR: Wiley 16	Boxscore	Pts: Campazzo 18; Rebs: Tavares 12; Asts: Causeur 5 PIR: Campazzo 20	Arena: Gran Canaria Arena; Referees: E. Pérez Pizarro, J.R. García Ortiz, Alberto Baena

14 April 2019 27	Real Madrid	94–70	Monbus Obradoiro	Madrid
12:30 (CEST)	Scoring by quarter: 20-22, 25-21, 26-13, 23-14
	Pts: Campazzo 15; Rebs: Tavares 10; Asts: Campazzo 9 PIR: Campazzo 27	Boxscore	Pts: Singler 17; Rebs: Nick Spires 6 Asts: Pepe Pozas 5 PIR: Singler 18	Arena: WiZink Center; Attendance: 7,165; Referees: Carlos Cortés, Jorge Martínez, Esperanza Mendoza

2 May 2019 28	UCAM Murcia	80–82	Real Madrid	Murcia
21:00 (CEST)	Scoring by quarter: 18-19, 19-20, 19-24, 24-19
	Pts: Booker, Doyle 17; Rebs: Cățe 9 Asts: Lecomte, Booker 3 PIR: Kyle Hunt 16	Boxscore	Pts: Campazzo 20; Rebs: Tavares 6 Asts: Campazzo, Llull, Taylor 3 PIR: Campazzo 26	Arena: Palacio de Deportes; Attendance: 7,268; Referees: Daniel Hierrezuelo, Martín Caballero, Arnau Padrós

27 April 2019 29	Real Madrid	94–89	Cafés Candelas Breogán	Madrid
20:30 (CEST)	Scoring by quarter: 24-24, 15-22, 33-16, 22-27
	Pts: Fernández, Campazzo 17; Rebs: Ayón 9 Asts: Campazzo 5 PIR: Fernández, Campazzo 21	Boxscore	Pts: Redivo 19; Rebs: Sulejmanović 9 Asts: McCallum Jr. 5 PIR: Redivo 16	Arena: WiZink Center; Attendance: 7,193; Referees: Jordi Aliaga, Francisco J. Araña, Javier Torres

4 May 2019 30	San Pablo Burgos	84–102	Real Madrid	Burgos
19:30 (CEST)	Scoring by quarter: 16-25, 25-25, 21-29, 22-23
	Pts: Huskić 14; Rebs: Zipser 7 Asts: Álex López 4 PIR: Huskić 17	Boxscore	Pts: Causeur 20; Rebs: Ayón 10; Asts: Campazzo, Deck 5 PIR: Causeur 21	Arena: Coliseum Burgos; Attendance: 9,316; Referees: Carlos Cortés, Oscar Perea, Alberto Baena

9 May 2019 31	Real Madrid	109–92	Movistar Estudiantes	Madrid
21:30 (CEST)	Scoring by quarter: 30-18, 25-20, 29-23, 25-31
	Pts: Taylor 15; Rebs: Tavares, Thompkins 7 Asts: Llull 5 PIR: Campazzo 21	Boxscore	Pts: Gentile, Caner-Medley 18; Rebs: Caner-Medley 13; Asts: Cook 7 PIR: Caner-Medley 26	Arena: WiZink Center; Attendance: 7,139; Referees: Fernando Calatrava, Martín Caballero, Jacobo Rial

11 May 2019 32	Tecnyconta Zaragoza	70–85	Real Madrid	Zaragoza
18:00 (CEST)	Scoring by quarter: 10-20, 22-22, 24-16, 14-'27
	Pts: Williams 12; Rebs: Okoye 9 Asts: Okoye 5 PIR: Williams 16	Boxscore	Pts: Tavares 17; Rebs: Tavares 11; Asts: Llull 7 PIR: Tavares 27	Arena: Pabellón Príncipe Felipe; Attendance: 9,281; Referees: J.C García González, Luis Miguel Castillo, Iyán González

21 May 2019 33	Real Madrid	83–77	Valencia Basket	Madrid
19:30 (CEST)	Scoring by quarter: 14-25, 29-13, 24-21, 16-18
	Pts: Taylor 16; Rebs: Ayón 9 Asts: Campazzo 7 PIR: Ayón 20	Boxscore	Pts: Dubljević 13; Rebs: Dubljević 10; Asts: San Emeterio 4 PIR: Thomas, Vives 16	Arena: WiZink Center; Attendance: 7,376; Referees: J.A. Martín Bertrán, Oscar Perea, Alfonso Olivares

26 May 2019 34	Delteco GBC	76–95	Real Madrid	San Sebastián
12:30 (CEST)	Scoring by quarter: 21-24, 16-24, 26-25, 13-22
	Pts: Nick Zeisloft, Burjanadze 13; Rebs: Burjanadze 9 Asts: Daniel Pérez 6 PIR: Burjanadze 19	Boxscore	Pts: Campazzo 18; Rebs: Ayón 9 Asts: Llull 8 PIR: Ayón 28	Arena: Donostia Arena; Attendance: 6,486; Referees: Carlos Peruga, Vicente Bultó, Alberto Baena

==== Results overview ====
Win Loss

Opposition	Home score	Away score	Double
Baxi Manresa	91-57	78-83	174-135
Cafés Candelas Breogán	94-89	84-71	165-173
Divina Seguros Joventut	92-69	73-84	176-142
FC Barcelona Lassa	76-82	86-69	145-168
Delteco GBC	104-71	94-75	198-146
Herbalife Gran Canaria	87-63	71-77	164-134
Iberostar Tenerife	88-73	82-91	179-155
Kirolbet Baskonia	82-76	74-91	173-150
Monbus Obradoiro	94-70	73-86	180-143
Montakit Fuenlabrada	89-79	80-95	184-159
MoraBanc Andorra	105-107	66-87	192-173
Movistar Estudiantes	109-92	93-88	197-185
San Pablo Burgos	90-77	84-102	192-161
Tecnyconta Zaragoza	98-96	70-85	183-166
UCAM Murcia	80-74	80-82	164-154
Unicaja	89-82	103-102	191-185
Valencia Basket	83-77	70-88	171-147

=== ACB Playoffs ===
Win Loss

==== Quarterfinals ====
30 May 2019 1	Real Madrid	98–75	Baxi Manresa	Madrid
21:30 (CEST)	Scoring by quarter: 29-15, 24-22, 25-21, 20-17
	Pts: Randolph 15; Rebs: Campazzo 7 Asts: Campazzo 6 PIR: Campazzo 17	Boxscore	Pts: Lalanne 26; Rebs: Tomàs 7 Asts: Gabriel Lundberg 6 PIR: Lalanne 20	Arena: WiZink Center; Attendance: 7,465; Referees: Carlos Cortés, Luis Miguel Castillo, A. Sánchez Sixto

2 June 2019 2	Baxi Manresa	73–88	Real Madrid	Manresa
21:30 (CEST)	Scoring by quarter: 11-26, 17-21, 17-24, 28-17
	Pts: García 13; Rebs: Lalanne 6 Asts: Gabriel Lundberg 7 PIR: García 15	Boxscore	Pts: Campazzo 14; Rebs: Tavares 9 Asts: Campazzo 7 PIR: Campazzo 23	Arena: Nou Congost; Attendance: 4,950; Referees: Antonio Conde, Jorge Martínez, Jacobo Rial

Real Madrid win the series 2-0

==== Semifinals ====
6 June 2019 1	Real Madrid	94–72	Valencia	Madrid
21:00 (CEST)	Scoring by quarter: 26-18, 22-15, 26-13, 20-26
	Pts: Randolph 24; Rebs: Randolph 6 Asts: Campazzo 6 PIR: Randolph 30	Boxscore	Pts: Doornekamp 15; Rebs: Dubljević 7 Asts: Vives 4 PIR: Doornekamp 25	Arena: WiZink Center; Attendance: 8,733; Referees: Daniel Hierrezuelo, Carlos Cortés, Juan de Dios Oyón

8 June 2019 2	Real Madrid	79–66	Valencia	Madrid
21:00 (CEST)	Scoring by quarter: 14-22, 28-14, 26-16, 11-14
	Pts: Llull 13; Rebs: Ayón 8 Asts: Fernández 5 PIR: Ayón 18	Boxscore	Pts: Tobey, Dubljević 12; Rebs: Labeyrie 8 Asts: Van Rossom, Sastre 3 PIR: Thomas, Tobey 16	Arena: WiZink Center; Attendance: 9,373; Referees: J.A. Martín Bertrán, Fernando Calatrava, Rafael Serrano

10 June 2019 3	Valencia	78–85	Real Madrid	Valencia
21:00 (CEST)	Scoring by quarter: 19-20, 19-15, 22-28, 18-22
	Pts: Dubljević 19; Rebs: Tobey 9 Asts: Sastre 3 PIR: Dubljević 18	Boxscore	Pts: Fernández 16; Rebs: Randolph 9 Asts: Randolph, Fernández, Campazzo 4 PIR: Randolph 24	Arena: Font de San Lluís; Attendance: 7,809; Referees: Antonio Conde, Carlos Cortés, Vicente Bultó

Real Madrid win the series 3-0

==== Finals ====
15 June 2019 1	Real Madrid	87–67	FC Barcelona Lassa	Madrid
21:00 (CEST)	Scoring by quarter: 22-17, 25-15, 16-20, 24-15
	Pts: Campazzo 19; Rebs: Ayón 7 Asts: Campazzo, Llull 4 PIR: Campazzo 24	Boxscore	Pts: Heurtel 14; Rebs: Claver 12; Asts: Pangos, Heurtel 3 PIR: Claver 17	Arena: WiZink Center; Attendance: 11,876; Referees: Carlos Peruga, Fernando Calatrava, Luis Miguel Castillo

17 June 2019 2	Real Madrid	81–80	FC Barcelona Lassa	Madrid
21:00 (CEST)	Scoring by quarter: 11-17, 18-17, 24-25, 28-21
	Pts: Carroll 25; Rebs: Tavares 9 Asts: Llull 5 PIR: Carroll 28	Boxscore	Pts: Heurtel 30; Rebs: Tomić 7 Asts: Pangos, Heurtel, Oriola 2 PIR: Heurtel 28	Arena: WiZink Center; Attendance: 12,247; Referees: José A. Martín, Antonio Conde y Rafael Serrano.

19 June 2019 3	FC Barcelona Lassa	78–77	Real Madrid	Barcelona
21:00 (CEST)	Scoring by quarter: 19-18, 15-22, 22-18, 22-19
	Pts: Heurtel 21; Rebs: Claver 7 Asts: Hanga, Heurtel 4 PIR: Heurtel 19	Boxscore	Pts: Campazzo 18; Rebs: Randolph, Tavares 3 Asts: Campazzo 4 PIR: Campazzo 26	Arena: Palau Blaugrana; Attendance: 7,238; Referees: Daniel Hierrezuelo, Carlos Cortés, Vicente Bultó

21 June 2019 4	FC Barcelona Lassa	68–74	Real Madrid	Barcelona
21:00 (CEST)	Scoring by quarter: 21-24, 12-13, 14-18, 21-19
	Pts: Pangos 16; Rebs: Tomić 6 Asts: Pangos 4 PIR: Singleton 13	Boxscore	Pts: Campazzo 15; Rebs: Tavares 13; Asts: Campazzo 6 PIR: Campazzo 28	Arena: Palau Blaugrana; Attendance: 7,301; Referees: Antonio Conde, Carlos Peruga, Fernando Calatrava

Real Madrid win the series 3-1

=== EuroLeague ===
==== League table ====
Pos	Team	Pld	W	L	PF	PA	PD	Qualification
1	(Turkey) Fenerbahçe Beko	30	25	5	2504	2237	+267	Advance to playoffs
2	(Russia) CSKA Moscow	30	24	6	2590	2397	+193	Advance to playoffs
3	(Spain) Real Madrid	30	22	8	2578	2342	+236	Advance to playoffs
4	(Turkey) Anadolu Efes	30	20	10	2562	2406	+156	Advance to playoffs
5	(Spain) Barcelona Lassa	30	18	12	2358	2282	+76	Advance to playoffs

Source: EuroLeague
Rules for classification: All points scored in extra period(s) will not be counted in the standings, nor for any tie-break situation.

==== Results summary ====
Overall						Home					Away				
Pld	W	L	PF	PA	PD	W	L	PF	PA	PD	W	L	PF	PA	PD
30	22	8	2578	2342	+236	13	2	1379	1190	+189	9	6	1199	1152	+47

Last updated: 1 April 2019.
Source: Competitive matches All points scored in extra period(s) will not be counted in the standings, nor for any tie-break situation.

==== Results by round ====
Round	1	2	3	4	5	6	7	8	9	10	11	12	13	14	15	16	17	18	19	20	21	22	23	24	25	26	27	28	29	30
Ground	H	A	H	H	A	A	H	H	A	H	A	H	H	A	A	H	A	H	A	H	A	A	H	A	H	A	H	A	A	H
Result	W	W	W	W	W	W	W	W	L	L	W	W	W	W	L	W	W	W	L	W	W	L	W	L	W	W	W	L	W	L
Position	5	4	1	1	1	1	1	1	1	3	2	2	2	2	2	2	2	2	2	2	2	3	3	3	3	3	3	3	3	3

Last updated: 5 April 2019.
Source: Competitive matches
Ground: A = Away; H = Home; R = Rest. Result: L = Loss; W = Win; R = Rest; P = Postponed.

==== Matches ====
Win Loss

11 October 2018 1	Real Madrid (Spain)	109–93	(Turkey) Darüşşafaka	Madrid
21:00 (CEST)	Scoring by quarter: 25-18, 28-20, 38-31, 18-24
	Pts: Randolph 16; Rebs: Tavares 6 Asts: Llull 8 PIR: Llull 19	Boxscore	Pts: McCallum Jr. 18; Rebs: McCallum Jr., Eric 6 Asts: McCallum Jr. 6 PIR: McCallum Jr. 20	Arena: WiZink Center; Attendance: 8,168; Referees: (Italy) Luigi Lamonica, (Poland) Piotr Pastusiak, (Germany) Anne Panther

17 October 2018 2	AX Armani Exchange Olimpia Milan (Italy)	85–91	(Spain) Real Madrid	Milan
20:45 (CEST)	Scoring by quarter: 28-13, 22-28, 14-26, 21-24
	Pts: James 21; Rebs: Brooks 12; Asts: James 7 PIR: Micov 18	Boxscore	Pts: Randolph 25; Rebs: Campazzo 25; Asts: Campazzo 7 PIR: Randolph 33	Arena: Mediolanum Forum; Attendance: 9,559; Referees: (Slovenia) Sasa Pukl, (Serbia) Milivoje Jovcic, (Belgium) Renaud Geller

19 October 2018 3	Real Madrid (Spain)	97–79	(Spain) Kirolbet Baskonia	Madrid
21:00 (CEST)
	Pts: Llull 23; Rebs: Tavares 11; Asts: Campazzo 5 PIR: Llull 24	Boxscore	Pts: Huertas 14; Rebs: Diop, Garino 5 Asts: Vildoza 5 PIR: Garino 16	Arena: WiZink Center; Attendance: 10,390; Referees: (Ukraine) Borys Ryzhyk , (Turkey) Emin Mogulkoc, (Finland) Petri Mantyla

25 October 2018 4	Real Madrid (Spain)	89–55	(Montenegro) Budućnost VOLI	Madrid
21:00 (CEST)	Scoring by quarter: 21-15, 23-16, 21-13, 24-11
	Pts: Randolph, Carroll 11; Rebs: Tavares 14; Asts: Campazzo, Llull 7 PIR: Tavares 24	Boxscore	Pts: Gordić 13; Rebs: Omić 8 Asts: six players 1 PIR: Omić 12	Arena: WiZink Center; Attendance: 7,804; Referees: (Greece) Elias Koromilas, (Poland) Jakub Zamojski, (France) Joseph Bissang

2 November 2018 5	Žalgiris (Lithuania)	79–90	(Spain) Real Madrid	Kaunas
19:00 (CEST)	Scoring by quarter: 32-18, 12-25, 24-19, 11-28
	Pts: Jankūnas 18; Rebs: Jankūnas 7 Asts: Wolters 5 PIR: Jankūnas 27	Boxscore	Pts: Randolph 16; Rebs: Ayón 10; Asts: Fernández 7 PIR: Ayón 30	Arena: Žalgiris Arena; Attendance: 15,105; Referees: (Italy) Luigi Lamonica, (Croatia) Damir Javor, (Estonia) Aare Halliko

8 November 2018 6	Maccabi FOX Tel Aviv (Israel)	66–87	(Spain) Real Madrid	Tel Aviv
20:05 (CEST)	Scoring by quarter: 15-18, 8-23, 21-25, 22-21
	Pts: O'Bryant 17; Rebs: O'Bryant 7 Asts: O'Bryant, Kane 3 PIR: O'Bryant 18	Boxscore	Pts: Llull 17; Rebs: Ayón 12; Asts: Three players 3 PIR: Ayón 27	Arena: Menora Mivtachim Arena; Attendance: 10,300; Referees: (Slovenia) Sasa Pukl, (Poland) Piotr Pastusiak, (Croatia) Josip Radojkovic

15 November 2018 7	Real Madrid (Spain)	79–74	(Russia) Khimki	Madrid
21:00 (CEST)	Scoring by quarter: 19-12, 22-23, 15-20, 23-19
	Pts: Carroll 15; Rebs: Randolph 6 Asts: Causeur, Fernández 4 PIR: Causeur 19	Boxscore	Pts: Crocker, Gill 16; Rebs: Mickey 10; Asts: Bost 6 PIR: Gill 19	Arena: WiZink Center; Attendance: 8,517; Referees: (Germany) Robert Lottermoser, (Serbia) Milivoje Jovcic, (Slovenia) Milan Nedovic

20 November 2018 8	Real Madrid (Spain)	89–76	(Spain) Herbalife Gran Canaria	Madrid
21:00 (CEST)	Scoring by quarter: 22-28, 25-15, 15-14, 27-19
	Pts: Randolph 20; Rebs: Randolph 10; Asts: Causeur, Fernández, Campazzo, Klemen Prepelič, Taylor 3 PIR: Randolph 26	Boxscore	Pts: Strawberry 20; Rebs: Balvín, Báez 4 Asts: Radičević 6 PIR: Báez 14	Arena: WiZink Center; Attendance: 7,328; Referees: (Ukraine) Boris Ryzhyk, (Slovenia) Matej Boltauzer, (Turkey) Ersan Kartal

22 November 2018 9	Olympiacos (Greece)	88–83	(Spain) Real Madrid	Piraeus
19:15 (CEST)	Scoring by quarter: 29-22, 23-19, 13-24, 23-18
	Pts: Williams-Goss 23; Rebs: Milutinov 9 Asts: Williams-Goss 4 PIR: Williams-Goss 25	Boxscore	Pts: Carroll 16; Rebs: Tavares 10; Asts: Campazzo 13; PIR: Campazzo 24	Arena: Peace and Friendship Stadium; Attendance: 9,000; Referees: (Croatia) Sreten Radovic, (Latvia) Oļegs Latiševs, (Slovenia) Mario Majkic

29 November 2018 10	Real Madrid (Spain)	88–93	(Russia) CSKA Moscow	Madrid
21:00 (CEST)	Scoring by quarter: 20-24, 21-14, 20-29, 27-26
	Pts: Campazzo 23; Rebs: Ayón 7 Asts: Ayón 4 PIR: Campazzo 21	Boxscore	Pts: Higgins 24; Rebs: Clyburn, Hunter 6 Asts: de Colo 5 PIR: Clyburn 27	Arena: WiZink Center; Attendance: 12,749; Referees: (Slovenia) Sasa Pukl, (Portugal) Fernando Rocha, (Germany) Anne Panther

7 December 2018 11	Anadolu Efes (Turkey)	82–84	(Spain) Real Madrid	Istanbul
18:30 (CEST)	Scoring by quarter: 23-23, 29-22, 22-15, 8-24
	Pts: Moerman 19; Rebs: Moerman 10; Asts: Micić 8 PIR: Moerman 33	Boxscore	Pts: Ayón 20; Rebs: Ayón 11; Asts: Thompkins 8 PIR: Ayón 34	Arena: Sinan Erdem Dome; Attendance: 12,289; Referees: (Serbia) Milivoje Jovcic, (Poland) Piotr Pastusiak, (Greece) Ioannis Foufis

13 December 2018 12	Real Madrid (Spain)	92–65	(Spain) FC Barcelona Lassa	Madrid
21:00 (CEST)	Scoring by quarter: 22-17, 31-13, 16-20, 23-15
	Pts: Thompkins 17; Rebs: Thompkins 7 Asts: Campazzo 6 PIR: Thompkins 20	Boxscore	Pts: Heurtel 16; Rebs: three players 4 Asts: Heurtel 5 PIR: Heurtel 14	Arena: WiZink Center; Attendance: 11,953; Referees: (Serbia) Ilija Belosevic, (Germany) Robert Lottermoser, (Portugal) Sergio Silva

19 December 2018 13	Real Madrid (Spain)	89–68	(Greece) Panathinaikos	Madrid
21:00 (CEST)	Scoring by quarter: 23-10, 20-21, 20-24, 26-13
	Pts: Causeur 14; Rebs: Ayón 9 Asts: Campazzo, Ayón 5 PIR: Ayón 21	Boxscore	Pts: Langford 20; Rebs: Lojeski 6 Asts: Calathes 4 PIR: Langford 20	Arena: WiZink Center; Attendance: 9,749; Referees: (Ukraine) Boris Ryzhyk, (Croatia) Damir Javor, (Croatia) Tomislav Hordov

21 December 2018 14	Bayern Munich (Germany)	72–82	(Spain) Real Madrid	Munich
20:00 (CEST)	Scoring by quarter: 16-27, 15-19, 28-19, 13-17
	Pts: Jović 11; Rebs: Barthel 6 Asts: Jović 5 PIR: Jović 15	Boxscore	Pts: Randolph 22; Rebs: Thompkins 6 Asts: Ayón 5 PIR: Randolph 25	Arena: Audi Dome; Attendance: 6,500; Referees: (Italy) Luigi Lamonica, (Portugal) Fernando Rocha, (Ukraine) Mykola Ambrosov

28 December 2018 15	Fenerbahçe Beko (Turkey)	65–63	(Spain) Real Madrid	Istanbul
18:30 (CEST)	Scoring by quarter: 22-12, 10-20, 16-12, 17-19
	Pts: Datome 17; Rebs: Melli 8 Asts: Gudurić 4 PIR: Datome 20	Boxscore	Pts: Fernández 12; Rebs: Ayón 6 Asts: Campazzo 6 PIR: Randolph 12	Arena: Fenerbahçe Ülker Sports Arena; Attendance: 12,872; Referees: (Greece) Christos Christodoulou, (Italy) Carmelo Paternico, (Slovenia) Milan Nedovic

3 January 2019 16	Real Madrid (Spain)	91–79	(Israel) Maccabi FOX Tel Aviv	Madrid
20:45 (CEST)	Scoring by quarter: 21-19, 23-25, 25-18, 22-17
	Pts: Ayón 18; Rebs: Ayón 9 Asts: Llull 10; PIR: Ayón 31	Boxscore	Pts: Roll) 23; Rebs: Tyus 8 Asts: Roll) 5 PIR: Roll) 26	Arena: WiZink Center; Attendance: 9,915; Referees: (Slovenia) Matej Boltauzer, (Croatia) Sreten Radovic, (Serbia) Uros Obrknezevic

8 January 2019 17	Herbalife Gran Canaria (Spain)	67–75	(Spain) Real Madrid	Las Palmas
21:30 (CEST)	Scoring by quarter: 15-16, 19-11, 22-25, 11-23
	Pts: Oliver, Báez 12; Rebs: Balvín 8 Asts: Oliver, Magette 4 PIR: Oliver 16	Boxscore	Pts: Llull 16; Rebs: Ayón 6 Asts: Llull 4 PIR: Llull 18	Arena: Gran Canaria Arena; Attendance: 5,214; Referees: (Germany) Robert Lottermoser, (Slovenia) Saso Petek, (Lithuania) Saulius Racys

10 January 2019 18	Real Madrid (Spain)	94–78	(Greece) Olympiacos	Madrid
21:00 (CEST)	Scoring by quarter: 28-23, 26-23, 18-17, 22-15
	Pts: Randolph 16; Rebs: Randolph 8 Asts: Campazzo 5 PIR: Ayón 20	Boxscore	Pts: LeDay 15; Rebs: LeDay 8 Asts: Spanoulis 11; PIR: Spanoulis 18	Arena: WiZink Center; Attendance: 10,860; Referees: (Croatia) Damir Javor, (Poland) Piotr Pastusiak, (France) Mehdi Difallah

18 January 2019 19	Budućnost VOLI (Montenegro)	73–60	(Spain) Real Madrid	Podgorica
19:00 (CEST)	Scoring by quarter: 19-15, 17-13, 20-20, 17-12
	Pts: Cole 14; Rebs: Clarke 12; Asts: Cole 7 PIR: Clarke 25	Boxscore	Pts: Llull 10; Rebs: Llull 6 Asts: Campazzo 4 PIR: Campazzo 10	Arena: Morača Sports Center; Attendance: 5,262; Referees: (Greece) Christos Christodoulou, (Poland) Jakub Zamojski, (Latvia) Ingus Baumanis

24 January 2019 20	Real Madrid (Spain)	92–84	(Turkey) Anadolu Efes	Madrid
21:00 (CEST)	Scoring by quarter: 21-21, 21-21, 22-19, 28-23
	Pts: Randolph 24; Rebs: Llull 8 Asts: Campazzo, Ayón, Llull 5 PIR: Randolph 28	Boxscore	Pts: Micić 21; Rebs: Moerman 5 Asts: Larkin, Micić 5 PIR: Micić 21	Arena: WiZink Center; Attendance: 8,972; Referees: (Saar Protectorate) Ilija Belosevic, (Italy) Carmelo Paternico, (France) Joseph Bissang

1 February 2019 21	Darüşşafaka (Turkey)	82–86	(Spain) Real Madrid	Istanbul
18:15 (CEST)	Scoring by quarter: 16-23, 22-30, 21-19, 23-14
	Pts: Douglas 27; Rebs: Evans 12; Asts: Douglas 4 PIR: Evans 31	Boxscore	Pts: Randolph, Thompkins 15; Rebs: Tavares 7 Asts: Campazzo 5 PIR: Randolph 16	Arena: Volkswagen Arena Istanbul; Attendance: 3,051; Referees: (Croatia) Sreten Radovic, (Greece) Elias Koromilas, (Ukraine) Mykola Ambrosov

8 February 2019 22	CSKA Moscow (Russia)	82–78	(Spain) Real Madrid	Moscow
18:00 (CEST)	Scoring by quarter: 22-20, 12-20, 30-21, 18-17
	Pts: de Colo 21; Rebs: Peters 8 Asts: de Colo 4 PIR: de Colo 22	Boxscore	Pts: Randolph 20; Rebs: Ayón 6 Asts: Ayón 6 PIR: Ayón 21	Arena: Megasport Sport Palace; Attendance: 12,341; Referees: (Germany) Robert Lottermoser, (Croatia) Damir Javor, (Lithuania) Gytis Vilius

22 February 2019 23	Real Madrid (Spain)	91–78	(Germany) Bayern Munich	Madrid
21:00 (CEST)	'Scoring by quarter: 22-17, 20-22, 29-13, 20-26
	Pts: Llull 15; Rebs: Tavares 9 Asts: Llull 7 PIR: Deck 18	Boxscore	Pts: Barthel 14; Rebs: Lučić 6 Asts: Hobbs 7 PIR: Lučić 18	Arena: WiZink Center; Attendance: 10,256; Referees: (Italy) Luigi Lamonica, (Portugal) Fernando Rocha, (Israel) Amit Balak

1 March 2019 24	FC Barcelona Lassa (Spain)	77–70	(Spain) Real Madrid	Barcelona
21:00 (CEST)	Scoring by quarter: 16-17, 26-20, 14-14, 21-19
	Pts: Tomić 20; Rebs: Tomić 13; Asts: Heurtel 10; PIR: Tomić 28	Boxscore	Pts: Fernández 15; Rebs: Randolph 9 Asts: Fernández, Randolph 2 PIR: Randolph 16	Arena: Palau Blaugrana; Attendance: 7,311; Referees: (Slovenia) Matej Boltauzer, (Serbia) Ilija Belosevic, (Turkey) Emin Mogulkoc

7 March 2019 25	Real Madrid (Spain)	101–86	(Turkey) Fenerbahçe	Madrid
21:00 (CEST)	Scoring by quarter: 27-25, 25-20, 25-16, 24-25
	Pts: Randolph 21; Rebs: Tavares 5 Asts: Llull 10; PIR: Randolph, Llull 25	Boxscore	Pts: Sloukas 15; Rebs: Melli 6 Asts: Sloukas 7 PIR: Sloukas 18	Arena: WiZink Center; Attendance: 11,471; Referees: (Greece) Christos Christodoulou, (Italy) Carmelo Paternico, (Croatia) Tomislav Hordov

14 March 2019 26	Khimki (Russia)	75–100	(Spain) Real Madrid	Mytishchi
18:00 (CEST)	Scoring by quarter: 22-24, 16-27, 12-19, 25-30
	Pts: Shved 21; Rebs: Thomas 7 Asts: Marković 5 PIR: Shved 18	Boxscore	Pts: Causeur 22; Rebs: Tavares 11; Asts: Campazzo 9 PIR: Causeur 24	Arena: Mytishchi Arena; Attendance: 6,456; Referees: (Ukraine) Borys Ryzhyk, (Serbia) Milivoje Jovcic, (Lithuania) Jurgis Laurinavicius

20 March 2019 27	Real Madrid (Spain)	92–89	(Italy) AX Armani Exchange Olimpia Milan	Madrid
21:00 (CEST)	Scoring by quarter: 19-33, 31-23, 24-19, 18-14
	Pts: Llull 14; Rebs: Ayón 10; Asts: Campazzo 5 PIR: Tavares 21	Boxscore	Pts: James 35; Rebs: James 8 Asts: James 3 PIR: James 37	Arena: WiZink Center; Attendance: 8,978; Referees: (Slovenia) Sasa Pukl, (Greece) Elias Koromilas, (Finland) Petri Mantyla

22 March 2019 28	Kirolbet Baskonia (Spain)	86–76	(Spain) Real Madrid	Vitoria-Gasteiz
20:30 (CEST)	Scoring by quarter: 22-18, 17-18, 25-17, 22-23
	Pts: Vildoza 20; Rebs: Voigtmann 12; Asts: Huertas 4 PIR: Poirier 30	Boxscore	Pts: Thompkins 17; Rebs: Ayón 9 Asts: Llull 5 PIR: Thompkins 16	Arena: Fernando Buesa Arena; Attendance: 12,782; Referees: (Slovenia) Matej Boltauzer, (Turkey) Emin Mogulkoc, (Lithuania) Gytis Vilius

28 March 2019 29	Panathinaikos (Greece)	73–74	(Spain) Real Madrid	Athens
20:00 (CEST)	Scoring by quarter: 32-14, 13-19, 14-20, 14-21
	Pts: Langford, Calathes 14; Rebs: Calathes 9 Asts: Calathes 7 PIR: Langford 18	Boxscore	Pts: Tavares 14; Rebs: Tavares 16; Asts: Campazzo 5 PIR: Tavares 29	Arena: Olympic Sports Center Athens; Attendance: 1,8003; Referees: (Italy) Luigi Lamonica, (Croatia) Damir Javor, (Germany) Anne Panther

4 April 2019 30	Real Madrid (Spain)	86–93	(Lithuania) Žalgiris	Madrid
21:00 (CEST)	Scoring by quarter: 27-25, 10-21, 23-20, 26-27
	Pts: Tavares 22; Rebs: Tavares 7 Asts: Prepelič 5 PIR: Tavares 32	Boxscore	Pts: Davies 27; Rebs: Davies 10; Asts: Walkup 7 PIR: Davies 34	Arena: WiZink Center; Attendance: 8437; Referees: (Germany) Robert Lottermoser, (Slovenia) Saso Petek, (Serbia) Uros Nikolic

==== Results overview ====
Win Draw Loss

Opposition	Home score	Away score	Double
(Turkey) Anadolu Efes	92-82	82-84	176-164
(Italy) AX Armani Exchange Olimpia	92-89	85-91	183-174
(Germany) FC Bayern Munich	91-78	72-82	173-150
(Montenegro) Budućnost VOLI	89-55	60-73	149-128
(Russia) CSKA Moscow	88-93	82-78	166-175
(Turkey) Darüşşafaka S.K.	109-93	82-86	195-175
(Spain) FC Barcelona Lassa	92-65	77-70	162-142
(Turkey) Fenerbahçe Beko	101-86	65-63	166-151
(Spain) Herbalife Gran Canaria	89-76	67-75	164-143
(Russia) Khimki	79-74	75-100	179-149
(Spain) Kirolbet Baskonia	97-79	76-86	173-165
(Israel) Maccabi FOX Tel Aviv	91-79	66-87	178-145
(Greece) Olympiacos	94-78	88-83	177-166
(Greece) Panathinaikos Superfoods	89-68	73-74	163-141
(Lithuania) Žalgiris	86-93	79-90	176-172

=== Euroleague Playoffs ===
==== Quarterfinals ====
Win Loss

17 April 2019 1	Real Madrid (Spain)	75–72	(Greece) Panathinaikos	Madrid
21:15 (CEST)	Scoring by quarter: 21-17, 22-18, 15-17, 17-20
	Pts: Taylor 13; Rebs: Tavares 8 Asts: Campazzo 6 PIR: Tavares 19	Boxscore	Pts: Calathes 17; Rebs: Papapetrou 7 Asts: Calathes 4 PIR: Papapetrou, Vougioukas 11	Arena: WiZink Center; Attendance: 10,159; Referees: (Ukraine) Borys Ryzhyk, (Croatia) Sreten Radovic, (France) Mehdi Difallah

19 April 2019 2	Real Madrid (Spain)	78–63	(Greece) Panathinaikos	Madrid
21:15 (CEST)	Scoring by quarter: 21-8, 14-18, 26-15, 17-22
	Pts: Campazzo 13; Rebs: Campazzo 7 Asts: Campazzo 9 PIR: Campazzo 26	Boxscore	Pts: Thomas 13; Rebs: Papagiannis, Papapetrou, Calathes 4 Asts: Calathes 7 PIR: Thomas 12	Arena: WiZink Center; Attendance: 10,751; Referees: (Germany) Robert Lottermoser, (Slovenia) Sasa Pukl, (Lithuania) Gytis Vilius

23 April 2019 3	Panathinaikos (Greece)	82–89	(Spain) Real Madrid	Athens
20:00 (CEST)	Scoring by quarter: 18-23, 23-13, 17-22, 24-31
	Pts: Calathes 17; Rebs: Papapetrou, Vougioukas 5 Asts: Calathes 7 PIR: Vougioukas, Calathes 17	Boxscore	Pts: Fernández, Campazzo 17; Rebs: Tavares 7 Asts: Campazzo 10; PIR: Campazzo 29	Arena: Olympic Sports Center Athens; Attendance: 18,182; Referees: (Italy) Luigi Lamonica, (Slovenia) Matej Boltauzer, (Turkey) Emin Mogulkoc

Real Madrid win the series 3-0

=== Euroleague Final Four ===
Win Loss

==== Semi-final ====
17 May 2019 Semi-Final	CSKA Moscow (Russia)	95–90	(Spain) Real Madrid	Vitoria-Gasteiz
21:00 (CEST)	Scoring by quarter: 18-22, 25-23, 22-28, 30-17
	Pts: De Colo, Rodríguez 23; Rebs: Peters, Clyburn, Hunter 5 Asts: Rodríguez 4 PIR: De Colo 27	Boxscore	Pts: Causeur 18; Rebs: Tavares 9 Asts: Campazzo 6 PIR: Causeur 17	Arena: Fernando Buesa Arena; Attendance: 13,199; Referees: (Slovenia) Matej Boltauzer, (Ukraine) Matej Borys Ryzhyk, (Germany) Anne Panther

==== Third place game ====
19 May 2019 Third place game	(Turkey) Fenerbahçe Beko	75–94	(Spain) Real Madrid	Vitoria-Gasteiz
18:30 (CEST)	Scoring by quarter: 16-24, 24-14, 23-31, 12-25
	Pts: Sloukas 17; Rebs: Düverioğlu 9 Asts: Sloukas 6 PIR: Sloukas 18	Boxscore	Pts: Ayón 23; Rebs: Ayón 11; Asts: Campazzo 15; PIR: Ayón 36	Arena: Fernando Buesa Arena; Attendance: 12,866; Referees: (Slovenia) Matej Boltauzer, (Portugal) Fernando Rocha, (France) Mehdi Difallah

=== Copa del Rey ===
==== Quarterfinals ====
Win Loss

15 February 2019 Quarterfinals	Real Madrid	94–63	Movistar Estudiantes	Madrid
21:30 (CEST)	Scoring by quarter: 29-27, 21-7, 23-14, 21-15
	Pts: Ayón, Deck 16; Rebs: Tavares 14; Asts: Campazzo 8 PIR: Ayón 27	Boxscore	Pts: Arteaga 12; Rebs: Caner-Medley 4 Asts: Darío Brizuela, Cook 4 PIR: Cook 14	Arena: WiZink Center; Attendance: 1,3280; Referees: M.A. Pérez Pérez, Antonio Conde, Rafael Serrano

==== Semifinals ====
16 February 2019 Semifinals	Real Madrid	93–81	Divina Seguros Joventut	Madrid
21:30 (CEST)	Scoring by quarter: 26-18, 22-20, 23-14, 22-29
	Pts: Campazzo, Ayón 16; Rebs: Ayón 9 Asts: Fernández, Llull 3 PIR: Ayón 23	Boxscore	Pts: Conor Morgan 20; Rebs: Harangody 6 Asts: Dimitrijević 6 PIR: Conor Morgan 21	Arena: WiZink Center; Attendance: 13,310; Referees: Daniel Hierrezuelo, Jiménez Trujillo, Fernando Calatrava

==== Final ====
17 February 2019 Final	Real Madrid	93–94(OT)	FC Barcelona Lassa	Madrid
19:30 (CEST)	Scoring by quarter: 16-20, 19-15, 25-11, 17-31, Overtime: 16-17
	Pts: Campazzo 19; Rebs: Randolph 7 Asts: Campazzo, Ayón 5 PIR: Ayón 24	Boxscore	Pts: Heurtel 22; Rebs: Singleton 9 Asts: Heurtel 6 PIR: Heurtel 22	Arena: WiZink Center; Attendance: 13,468; Referees: Juan Carlos García González, Miguel Ángel Pérez Pérez, Jiménez Trujillo

=== Supercopa de España ===
==== Semifinals ====
Win Loss

==== Semifinals ====
21 September 2018 Semifinals	Monbus Obradoiro	61–81	Real Madrid	Santiago de Compostela
21:30 (CEST)	Scoring by quarter: 12-20, 22-20, 8-28, 19-13
	Pts: Vasileiadis 15; Rebs: Nacho Llovet 5 Asts: Navarro 5 PIR: Navarro 17	Boxscore	Pts: Llull 17; Rebs: Ayón, Carroll 6 Asts: Llull 6 PIR: Llull 19	Arena: Multiusos Fontes do Sar; Attendance: 5,471; Referees: J.C García González, M.A. Pérez Pérez, Rafael Serrano

==== Final ====
22 September 2018 Semifinals	Real Madrid	80–73	Kirolbet Baskonia	Santiago de Compostela
20:30 (CEST)	Scoring by quarter: 20-21, 22-23, 19-18, 19-11
	Pts: Llull 15; Rebs: Fernández 7 Asts: Llull, Taylor 3 PIR: Llull 15	Boxscore	Pts: Shields 14; Rebs: Poirier 7 Asts: Hilliard 4 PIR: Diop 14	Arena: Multiusos Fontes do Sar; Attendance: 5,314; Referees: Daniel Hierrezuelo, E. Pérez Pizarro, M.A. Pérez Pérez
