= Myron Mathisson =

Polish physicist

- Born: Myron Mathisson; 4 December 1897; Warsaw, Poland
- Died: 13 September 1940 (aged 42); Cambridge, United Kingdom
- Known for: Mathisson–Papapetrou–Dixon equations
- Scientific career
- Fields: Theoretical Physics; General relativity Hebrew translator Engineer
- Institutions: University of Kazan; University of Warsaw; Jagiellonian University

Myron Mathisson (4 December 1897 – 13 September 1940) was a Polish theoretical physicist who made early contributions to the theory of general relativity, particularly in the motion of spinning bodies and the analysis of hyperbolic partial differential equations. His work on the equations of motion for extended bodies influenced later formulations such as the Mathisson–Papapetrou–Dixon equations, and he made progress on aspects of the Hadamard conjecture in specific cases.

== Life and work ==
=== Education ===
Mathisson was born in Warsaw, 4 December 1897. In 1915, Mathisson completed his secondary education at a philological gymnasium in Warsaw, graduating with a gold medal, a distinction awarded for academic excellence. He began his studies at the Faculty of Civil Engineering of the Warsaw University of Technology. Then, from 1917 he studied at the University of Warsaw where he graduated in 1924 under the guidance of Czesław Białobrzeski.

=== Military service ===
Between the years 1918–1919 he served in the military.

=== Physics research ===
In 1930, earned his doctorate at the University of Warsaw on the work of Sur le movement tournant d'un corps dans un champ de gravitation, and began to live there in 1932. He became a professor at the University of Kazan in 1936. The following year, he returned to Warsaw. In the years 1937–1939, he worked at the Jagiellonian University, under Jan Weyssenhoff.

Mathisson corresponded with Albert Einstein on theoretical aspects of relativity, as documented in archival correspondence. Niels Bohr invited him to Copenhagen. During his career he also interacted with Jacques Hadamard in Paris in 1939 and with Paul Dirac in Cambridge, England. Later, Dirac arranged for the posthumous publication of some of his work and wrote an obituary in Nature.

In chronological order; M. Mathisson, A. Papapetrou, and W. G. Dixon contributed to the derivation of the equations for a spinning body moving in a gravitational field, now known as the Mathisson–Papapetrou–Dixon equations.

=== Other work ===
Due to financial difficulties, Mathisson had to work as a Hebrew translator, as a draftsman producing technical drawings, and engineering calculations of the statics of reinforced concrete structures.

Mathisson died of tuberculosis in Cambridge, on 13 September 1940.

== Publications ==
During his short lifetime, he published the following 12 scientific papers:

- — (1931). "Die Beharrungsgesetze in der allgemeinen Relativitätstheorie". Zeitschrift für Physik (in German). 67 (3–4): 270–277. Bibcode:1931ZPhy...67..270M. doi:10.1007/BF01394605. S2CID 121043524.
- — (1931). "Die Mechanik des Materieteilchens in der allgemeinen Relativitätstheorie". Zeitschrift für Physik (in German). 67 (11–12): 826–844. Bibcode:1931ZPhy...67..826M. doi:10.1007/BF01390764. S2CID 120479236.
- — (1931). "Bewegungsproblem in der Physik und Elektronenkonstanten". Zeitschrift für Physik (in German). 69 (5–6): 389–408. Bibcode:1931ZPhy...69..389M. doi:10.1007/BF01391361. S2CID 121158482.
- — (1933). "Eine Lösungsmethode für Differentialgleichungen vom normalen hyperbolischen Typus". Mathematische Annalen (in German). 107 (1): 400–419. doi:10.1007/BF01448901. S2CID 122168307.
- — (1933). "Eine neue Integrationsmethode für Differentialgleichungen von normalem hyperbolischem Typus". Mathematische Annalen (in German). 107 (1): 648. doi:10.1007/BF01448913.
- — (1934). "Die Parametrixmethode in Anwendung auf hyperbolische Gleichungssysteme" (PDF). Prace Matematyczno-Fizyczne (in German). 41 (1): 177–185.
- — (1937). "Neue Mechanik materieller Systeme". Acta Physica Polonica (in German). 6: 163–209.
- — (1937). "Das zitternde Elektron und seine Dynamik". Acta Physica Polonica (in German). 6: 218–224.
- — (1939). "Le problème de M. Hadamard relatif à la diffusion des ondes". Comptes Rendus de l'Académie des Sciences de Paris (in French). 208: 1776–1778.
- — (1939). "Le problème de M. Hadamard relatif à la diffusion des ondes". Acta Mathematica (in French). 71 (1): 249–282. doi:10.1007/BF02547756.
- With Bielecki, A. & Weyssenhoff, J. W. (1939). "Sur un théorème concernant une transformation d'intégrales quadruples en intégrales curvilignes dans l'espace de Riemann". Bulletin International de l'Académie Polonaise des Sciences et Lettres de Cracovie, Classe des Sciences Mathématiques et Naturelles, Section A (in French): 22–28. JFM 65.1415.01.
- — (1940). "The variational equation of relativistic dynamics". Mathematical Proceedings of the Cambridge Philosophical Society. 36 (3): 331–350. Bibcode:1940PCPS...36..331M. doi:10.1017/S0305004100017370. S2CID 122742158.
- — (1942). "Relativistic dynamics of a spinning magnetic particle". Mathematical Proceedings of the Cambridge Philosophical Society. 38 (1): 40–60. Bibcode:1942PCPS...38...40M. doi:10.1017/S0305004100022210. S2CID 122107717.

== See also ==
- Józef Lubański
