= Anthony Randolph =

American-Slovenian basketball player (born 1989)

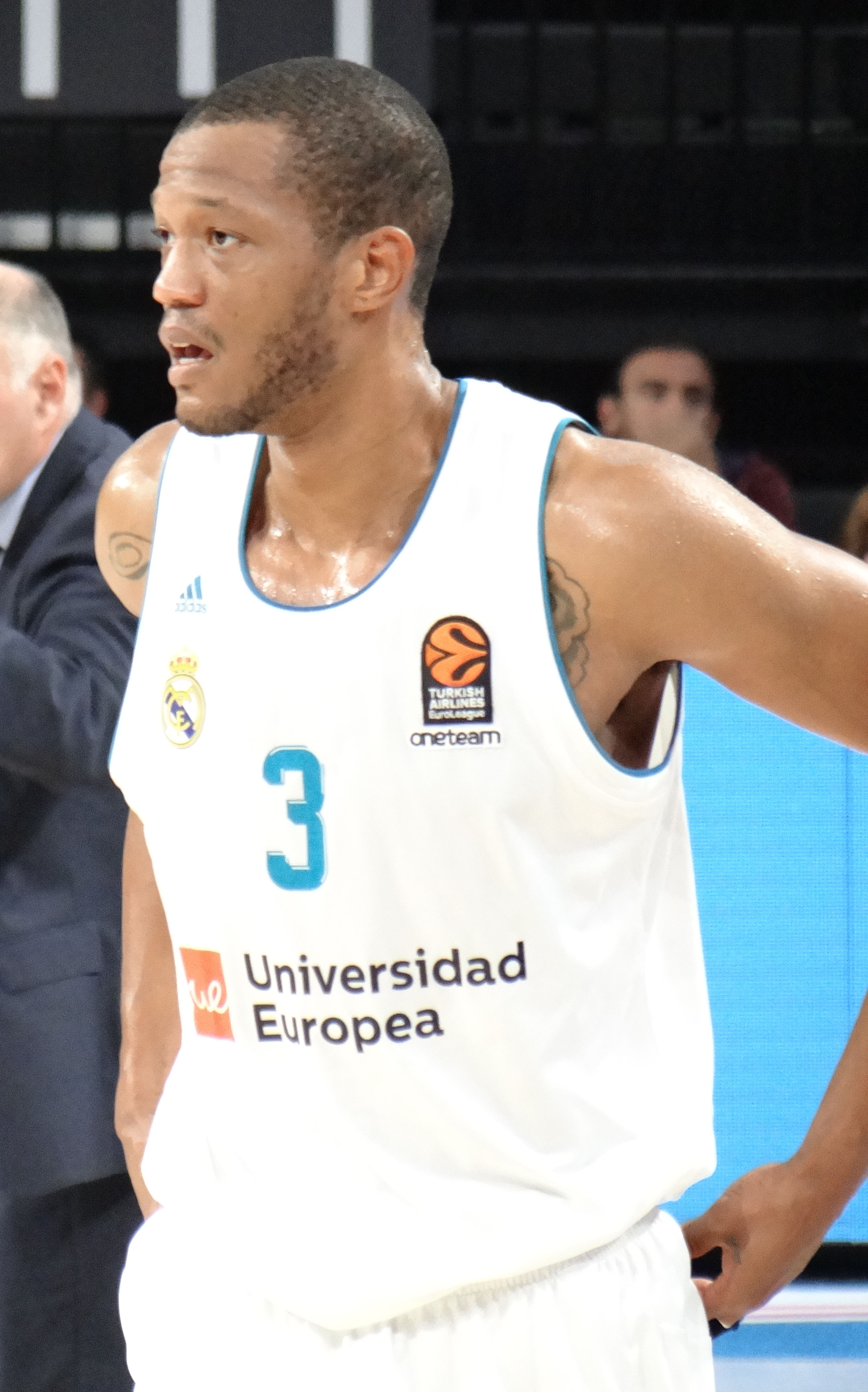
- Randolph with Real Madrid in 2017

Personal information
- Born: July 15, 1989 (age 37) Würzburg, West Germany
- Listed height: 6 ft 11 in (2.11 m)
- Listed weight: 230 lb (104 kg)

Career information
- High school: Woodrow Wilson (Dallas, Texas)
- College: LSU (2007–2008)
- NBA draft: 2008: 1st round, 14th overall pick
- Drafted by: Golden State Warriors
- Playing career: 2008–2023
- Position: Power forward / center
- Number: 4, 15, 3, 0

Career history
- 2008–2010: Golden State Warriors
- 2010–2011: New York Knicks
- 2011–2012: Minnesota Timberwolves
- 2012–2014: Denver Nuggets
- 2014–2016: Lokomotiv Kuban
- 2016–2023: Real Madrid

Career highlights
- 2x EuroLeague champion (2018, 2023); All-EuroLeague Second Team (2016); All-EuroCup Second Team (2015); 3× Liga ACB champion (2018, 2019, 2022); 2x Spanish Cup winner (2017, 2020); 5× Spanish Supercup winner (2018–2022); All-Liga ACB Second Team (2017); All-VTB United League First Team (2016); VTB United League blocks leader (2015); SEC All-Freshman Team (2008); Fourth-team Parade All-American (2007)

Career NBA statistics
- Points: 1,789 (7.1 ppg)
- Rebounds: 1,078 (4.3 rpg)
- Blocks: 224 (0.9 bpg)
- Stats at NBA.com
- Stats at Basketball Reference
Medals
Men's basketball
Representing Slovenia
EuroBasket
Gold medal – first place	2017 Finland–Israel–Romania–Turkey
Representing the United States
Pan American Games
Bronze medal – third place	2015 Toronto

Anthony Erwin Randolph Jr. (born July 15, 1989) is an American and naturalized Slovenian former professional basketball player. He represented the senior Slovenian national basketball team, winning the 2017 EuroBasket with them. Born in Germany to two American parents who served in the US military there, Randolph's family eventually relocated to the United States, where he grew up in Pasadena, California. The family later moved to Dallas, Texas, where Randolph soon became a standout at Woodrow Wilson High School, eventually being recruited by the LSU Tigers. After one year, Randolph left college, and entered the 2008 NBA draft, where he was chosen as the fourteenth pick overall by the Golden State Warriors. In 2016, he earned an All-EuroLeague Second Team selection.

== Early life ==
Anthony Erwin Randolph Jr. was born to Anthony and Crystal Randolph in Würzburg, West Germany, where both of his parents served in the US military. Randolph spent the first year of his life in Germany, before his family moved to Pasadena, California, where he spent the majority of his childhood. Randolph attended schools in Pasadena, as well as North Little Rock High School, in North Little Rock, Arkansas, before heading to Woodrow Wilson High School, in Dallas, Texas, for his junior year.

Randolph's mother decided the school he was attending in Arkansas, was not right for him because of the differences he had with the team's head coach and in school. At the time, he was a virtually unknown player. Pat Washington, Randolph's high school head coach, stated that while Randolph was athletically gifted, he needed a lot of work on skills, such as ball handling, shooting, etc. Washington also spoke of a technique the team had in workouts called the "LAB", where the basic rules were that all players in play were required to never stop running, under any circumstances, and if the ball was turned over at any point, the player was to run back on defense immediately. The technique might have contributed to Randolph's later defensive prowess, as he has been known to hustle back after turnovers, for defensive stops, in his professional career.

In high school, Randolph played all five positions on the floor. During his senior season, Randolph's team did not qualify for a playoff position, which coach Washington attributed to bad chemistry. Washington called the team very talented, and referred to Randolph as the best player on the roster, but stated that, "as time went by, jealousy and agendas set in and took over." Randolph averaged 25.8 points and 12.6 rebounds per game, as a senior. Although Randolph was named to the first team All-Area The Dallas Morning News boys basketball team, played in the Reebok Round Ball Classic, in Chicago, and the Adidas Derby Festival Classic in Kentucky (leading all scorers in both games), he was not chosen to play in the McDonald's All-American Game his senior year. Considered a five-star recruit by Rivals.com, Randolph was listed as the No. 4 small forward and the No. 12 player in the nation in 2007.

== College career ==
Glen Davis had just left Louisiana State University's basketball team as well as seven-foot center Magnum Rolle, who transferred to Louisiana Tech, leaving the team with only two bigs, one being a junior college transfer. Due to this fact, LSU told Randolph that if he joined their team, he could possibly play right away as a freshman. Washington said that Baylor, Georgetown, Kansas, Memphis, and Texas were also interested in recruiting Randolph. Though Memphis was Randolph's early choice in the recruitment process, he wanted to attend a school where he could play big minutes, which he figured he probably would not get to do at Memphis since the team's roster was so deep at the time. Randolph made an impact in college right away, as he had six blocks in just his third game during his freshman season. During his lone season at LSU, Randolph earned Honorable Mention All-SEC and First Team All-Freshman Team honors. Randolph was the only LSU Tiger to start all thirty-one games in his freshman season, and averaged 15.6 points, 8.5 rebounds, 1.2 assists, 1.13 steals, and 2.26 blocks per contest. Although the team only ended the season with a 13–18 record, Randolph finished strong by averaging 20.1 points during the last nine games of the year. Randolph also ranked third in the Southeastern Conference in rebounding and blocked shots, twelfth in scoring, and posted nine double-doubles his freshman season.

== Professional career ==
=== Golden State Warriors (2008–2010) ===
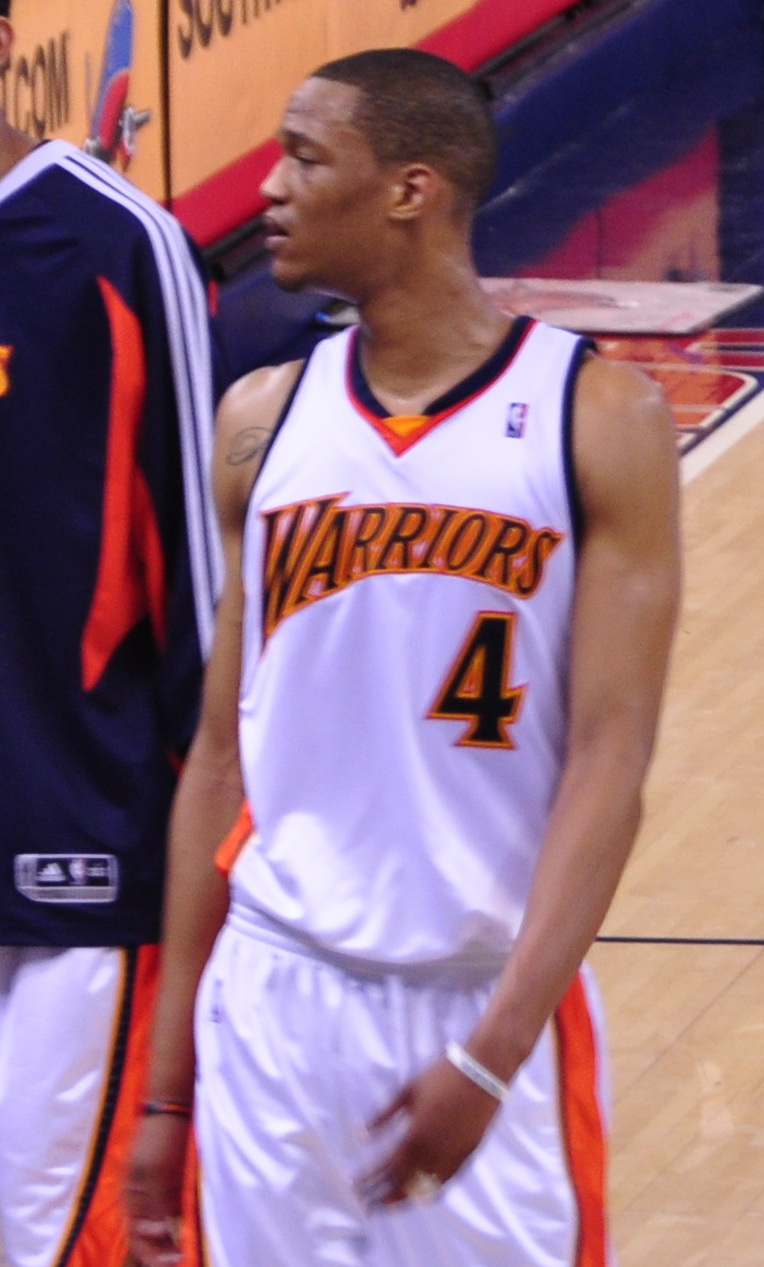
Randolph with the Golden State Warriors in 2009

Knowing there was a good chance he would be chosen in the first round, Randolph declared himself eligible for the 2008 NBA draft at the end of his freshman year at LSU. Some projected Randolph to go high in the year's draft because of his versatility and potential, while his detractors thought he might drop because of his thin frame and raw overall game. In either case, many believed Randolph could be the steal of the draft with his talent and tremendous potential.

In the draft, the Golden State Warriors selected Randolph with the fourteenth overall pick. The Warriors were coming off a disappointing 2007-08 season where the team was unable to qualify for the playoffs despite finishing the year with a 48–34 win–loss record. Early in his rookie season, Randolph received minimal playing time, causing some to question his attitude and work ethic, or if a possible rift might be developing between him and head coach Don Nelson. Many of the Warriors' main rotation players suffered injuries throughout Randolph's rookie campaign, and the team ended the season with only a 29–53 record. Nonetheless, the Warriors did play a fairly strong second half of the season, including Randolph, who averaged 13.5 points, 10.5 rebounds, 1.6 blocks, and 1.4 steals over the last twelve games of the year.

After attending a Dallas Mavericks-San Antonio Spurs playoff game during the Warriors' offseason, Randolph became motivated to improve his play, hitting the gym hard to prepare for the following season. Randolph's efforts first began to reward him in that year's Summer League being held in Las Vegas, Nevada, where he not only began to dominate consistently but was also referred to by various sportswriters as being the best talent in the entire Summer League. Among other highlights, including a then-Summer League record-tying 42-point explosion in game four against the Chicago Bulls' Summer League team, Randolph was invited to attend the USA Basketball Men's National Team mini-camp following his dominant Summer League performance. Though many believed Randolph was a lock to win Summer League MVP, the honor was given to 2009 first overall pick Blake Griffin. On October 14, 2009, the Warriors extended Randolph's contract through the 2010–11 NBA season.

=== New York Knicks (2010–2011) ===
On July 9, 2010, Randolph was traded to the New York Knicks along with Kelenna Azubuike, Ronny Turiaf and a future second-round pick in a sign and trade deal for David Lee.

=== Minnesota Timberwolves (2011–2012) ===
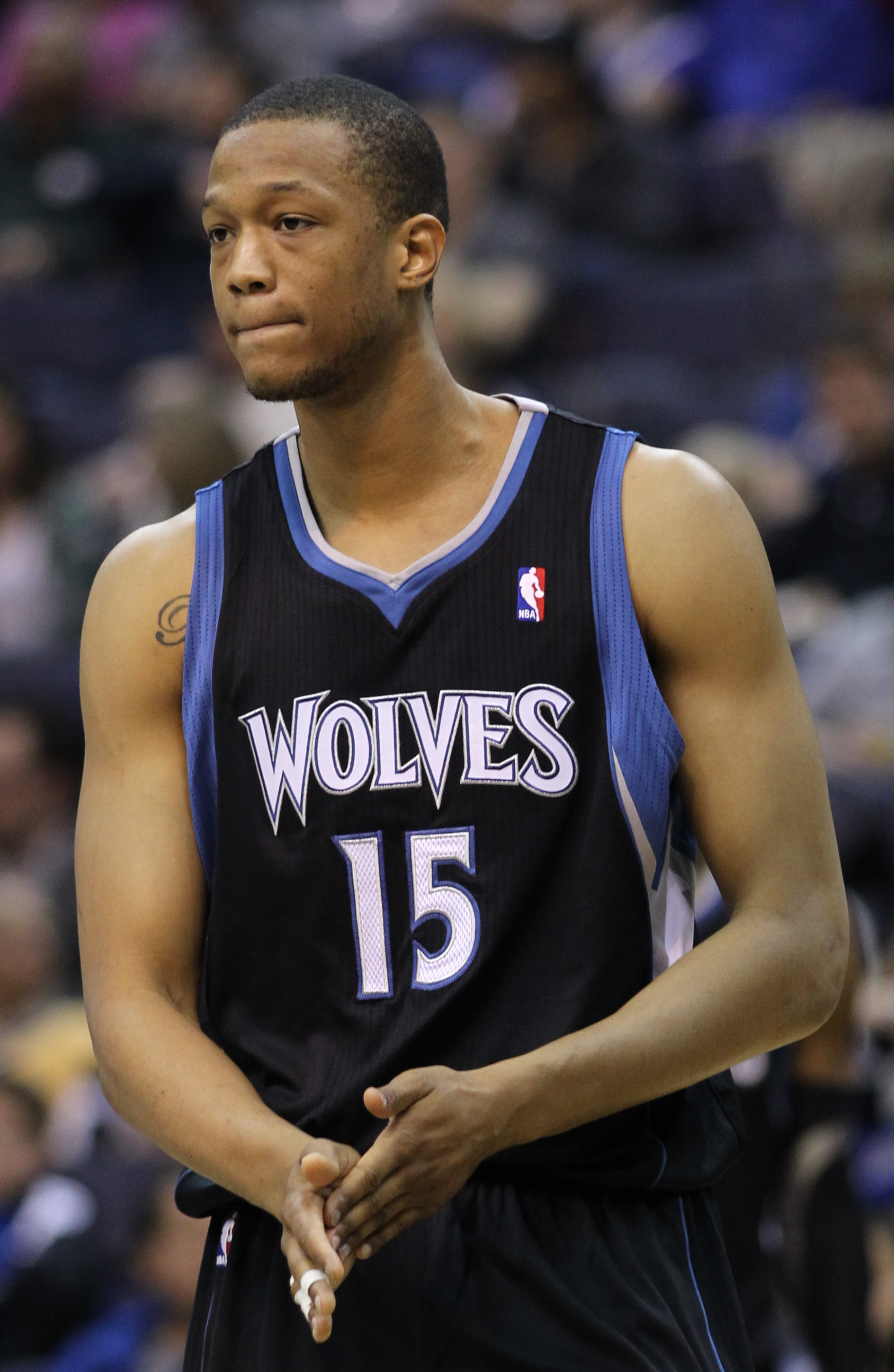
Randolph with the Minnesota Timberwolves in 2011

On February 22, 2011, Randolph was traded to the Minnesota Timberwolves in a three-way blockbuster deal which also involved the Denver Nuggets that brought Carmelo Anthony to New York. In his first start of the year on March 24, filling in for the injured Kevin Love, Randolph recorded a career high 31 points and 11 rebounds. He followed that up with 24 points and 15 rebounds.

=== Denver Nuggets (2012–2014) ===
On July 20, 2012, Randolph signed a multi-year contract with the Denver Nuggets.

On June 26, 2014, Randolph was traded, along with Doug McDermott, to the Chicago Bulls for Gary Harris, Jusuf Nurkić and a 2015 second-round pick.

On July 14, 2014, he was traded, along with two future second round draft picks and cash considerations, to the Orlando Magic in exchange for the draft rights to forward Milovan Raković. The next day, he was waived by the Magic.

=== Lokomotiv Kuban (2014–2016) ===
On August 18, 2014, Randolph signed a one-year deal with Lokomotiv Kuban of Russia. On April 16, 2015, he was named to the All-EuroCup Second Team. In July 2015, he re-signed with Lokomotiv. In his second season with Lokomotiv, he reached the 2016 EuroLeague Final Four, where his team lost in the semi-finals, but managed to win the third place game.

=== Real Madrid (2016–2023) ===
On July 15, 2016, Randolph signed a one-year deal with Real Madrid.

On June 22, 2017, he re-signed with Real Madrid. In May 2018, Real Madrid won the 2017–18 EuroLeague championship, after defeating Fenerbahçe Doğuş in the final game 85–80. Over 20 EuroLeague games, Randolph averaged 8.5 points, 3.9 rebounds and 1.3 assists per game.

In February 2020, Randolph was sidelined with a fractured finger.

On June 29, 2023, Randolph parted ways with the club after seven years and on December 13, 2024, he announced his retirement from basketball.

== National team career ==
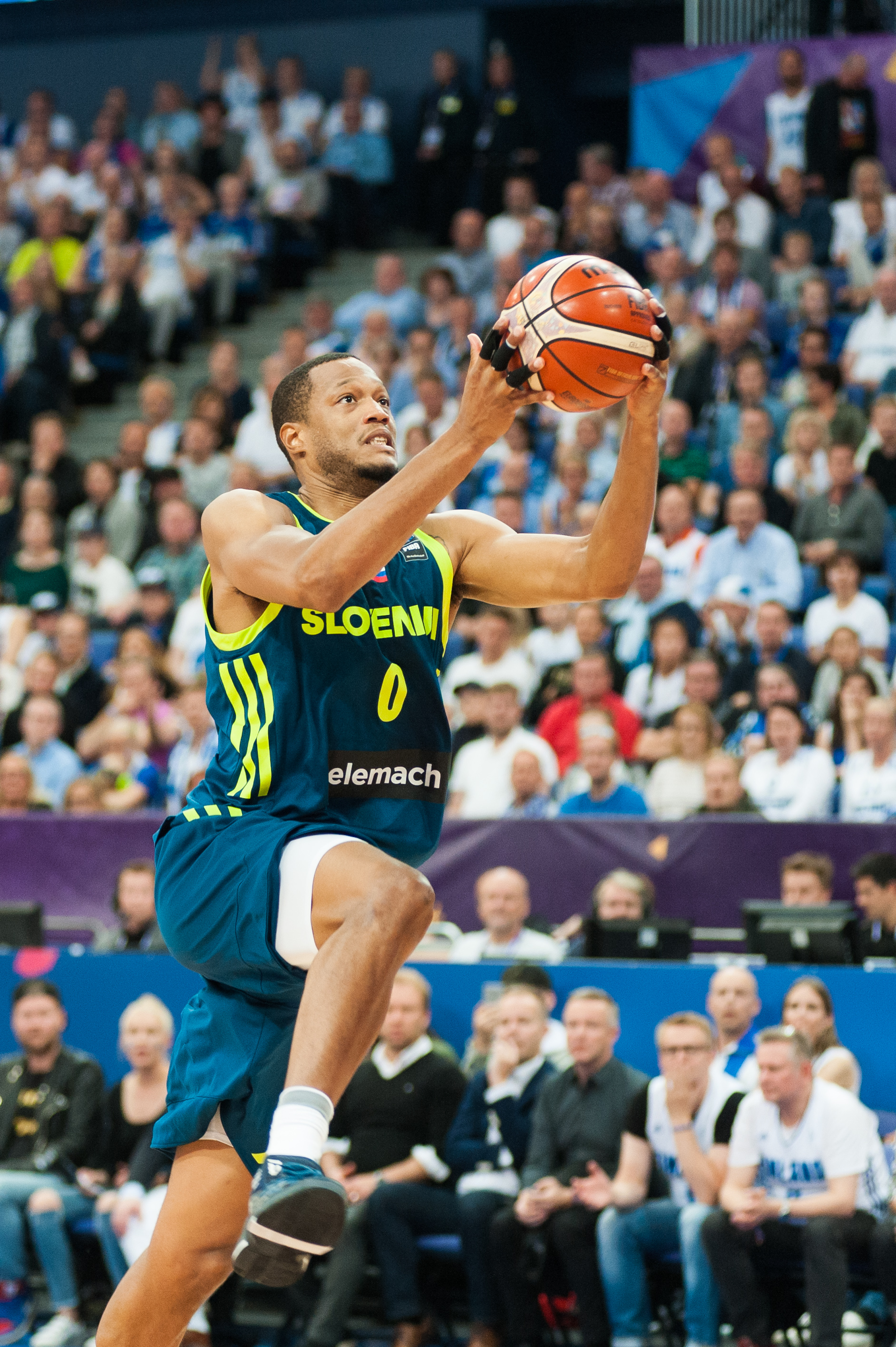
Randolph with Slovenia during EuroBasket 2017, where he won the gold medal

=== United States national team ===
Randolph represented the United States national team at the 2015 Pan American Games, where he won a bronze medal.

=== Slovenian national team ===
On June 23, 2017, it was announced that Randolph would play for the senior Slovenian national team, after acquiring a Slovenian passport. On September 17, 2017, Slovenia defeated Serbia, in the 2017 EuroBasket finals, by a score of 93–85, and thereby claimed the title of EuroBasket champions. Randolph was an important member of the team, as he averaged 11.7 points and 5.2 rebounds in 24.3 minutes of play.

== Career statistics ==
Legend
GP	Games played	GS	Games started	MPG	Minutes per game
FG%	Field-goal percentage	3P%	3-point field-goal percentage	FT%	Free-throw percentage
RPG	Rebounds per game	APG	Assists per game	SPG	Steals per game
BPG	Blocks per game	PPG	Points per game	PIR	Performance index rating
**Bold**	Career high

=== NBA ===
==== Regular season ====
Year	Team	GP	GS	MPG	FG%	3P%	FT%	RPG	APG	SPG	BPG	PPG
2008–09	Golden State	**63**	**22**	17.9	.462	.000	.716	5.8	0.8	0.7	1.2	7.9
2009–10	Golden State	33	8	**22.7**	.443	.200	**.801**	**6.5**	**1.3**	**0.8**	**1.5**	11.6
2010–11	New York	17	0	7.5	.311	.250	.500	2.4	0.4	0.2	0.5	2.1
2010–11	Minnesota	23	3	20.1	**.498**	.000	.703	5.2	1.1	**0.8**	0.7	**11.7**
2011–12	Minnesota	34	5	15.2	.470	.000	.762	3.6	0.6	0.4	1.0	7.4
2012–13	Denver	39	0	8.4	.491	.000	.689	2.4	0.3	0.5	0.5	3.7
2013–14	Denver	43	5	12.3	.386	**.295**	.754	2.8	0.7	0.6	0.4	4.8
Career		252	43	15.2	.453	.241	.740	4.3	0.7	0.6	0.9	7.1

==== Playoffs ====
Year	Team	GP	GS	MPG	FG%	3P%	FT%	RPG	APG	SPG	BPG	PPG
2013	Denver	**5**	0	**6.0**	**.818**	.000	**.727**	**1.2**	0.0	**0.4**	0.0	**5.2**
Career		5	0	6.0	.818	.000	.727	1.2	0.0	0.4	0.0	5.2

=== EuroLeague ===
†	Denotes season in which Randolph won the EuroLeague

Year	Team	GP	GS	MPG	FG%	3P%	FT%	RPG	APG	SPG	BPG	PPG	PIR
2015–16	Lokomotiv	23	20	**25.2**	.431	.253	.767	**6.0**	**1.2**	**1.3**	.9	**14.5**	14.9
2016–17	Real Madrid	**34**	15	21.2	.500	.367	.778	5.1	1.1	.4	**1.1**	10.2	12.6
2017–18†	Real Madrid	21	11	17.9	.472	.311	.657	3.8	**1.2**	.7	.3	8.2	9.6
2018–19	Real Madrid	33	**33**	22.6	.485	.414	.756	4.3	.9	.5	.3	12.5	13.8
2019–20	Real Madrid	19	19	23.9	.506	.491	.766	4.3	.4	.8	.2	13.7	**15.1**
2020-21	Real Madrid	13	11	18.9	.443	.373	**.889**	3.6	.8	.6	.3	9.3	9.7
2021-22	Real Madrid	17	1	9.0	.420	.323	.833	2.2	.2	.1	.2	3.6	4.1
2022-23†	Real Madrid	8	1	6.1	**.643**	**.600**	.600	1.2	—	.4	.1	3.0	2.8
Career		168	111	19.8	.489	.384	.762	4.2	.8	.6	.5	10.3	11.5

=== Liga ACB ===
†	Denotes season in which Randolph's team won the Liga ACB
	Led the league

Year	Team	GP	GS	MPG	FG%	3P%	FT%	RPG	APG	SPG	BPG	PPG	PIR
2016–17	Real Madrid	**37**	25	19.5	.440	.304	.651	3.9	**.8**	**.8**	**1.1**	7.9	9.3
2017-18†	Real Madrid	25	14	19.0	.444	.328	.771	**4.6**	.6	.6	.4	8.7	9.2
2018-19†	Real Madrid	35	**31**	**19.8**	**.487**	**.435**	.683	3.8	.6	.6	.3	**9.7**	**10.2**
2019-20	Real Madrid	20	14	18.2	.410	.413	.821	3.0	.5	.6	.3	8.3	7.6
2020-21	Real Madrid	5	4	17.2	.321	.333	**1.000**	3.6	**.8**	.6	.2	5.2	4.6
2021-22†	Real Madrid	25	2	11.5	.417	.349	.882	2.2	.2	.3	.4	4.9	4.7
2022-23	Real Madrid	11	1	11.5	.357	.304	.818	3.5	.4	.2	.1	4.2	5.0
Career		158	91	18.3	.463	.310	.754	4.1	3.0	.7	.3	7.8	11.6

=== College ===
Year	Team	GP	GS	MPG	FG%	3P%	FT%	RPG	APG	SPG	BPG	PPG
2007–08	LSU	31	31	32.8	.464	.105	.693	8.5	1.2	1.1	2.3	15.6
Career		31	31	32.8	.464	.105	.693	8.5	1.2	1.1	2.3	15.6

== Personal life ==
Randolph has a younger sister, Ashley, as well as a younger brother, Robert. Randolph has said that he enjoys fishing and is a fan of the Dallas Cowboys.
