= Achilles Papapetrou =

Greek theoretical physicist (1907–1997)

- Αχιλλέας Παπαπέτρου
- Born: February 2, 1907; Dolna Dzhumaya, Salonica Vilayet, Ottoman Empire (present-day Irakleia, Serres, Greece)
- Died: August 12, 1997 (aged 90); Paris, France
- Citizenship: Greece, France
- Education: National Technical University of Athens; University of Stuttgart
- Known for: Mathisson–Papapetrou–Dixon equations Majumdar–Papapetrou solution Weyl−Lewis−Papapetrou coordinates
- Spouse: Koula
- Scientific career
- Fields: Theoretical Physics; General relativity
- Workplaces: National Technical University of Athens, Dublin Institute for Advanced Studies, University of Manchester, Humboldt University of Berlin
- Thesis: Untersuchungen über dendritisches Wachstum von Kristallen
- Doctoral advisor: Paul Peter Ewald
- Other academic advisors: Helmut Hönl
- Doctoral students: Hans-Jürgen Treder; Rodolfo Gambini

Achilles Papapetrou (Greek: Αχιλλέας Νικολάου Παπαπέτρου; February 2, 1907 – August 12, 1997) was a Greek theoretical physicist who contributed to the general theory of relativity. He is known for the Mathisson–Papapetrou–Dixon equations, the Majumdar–Papapetrou solution, and the Weyl−Lewis−Papapetrou coordinates of gravity theory.

He worked on exact solutions of Einstein's field equations and long sought a solution for rotating masses, which, however, were only found by Roy Kerr. Papapetrou was then the first who recognized and welcomed Kerr's breakthrough announced at the Texas Symposium on Relativistic Astrophysics, Dallas, December 1963.

== Early life and education ==
Papapetrou was born in Irakleia Serres in Northern Greece (Macedonia province), on February 2, 1907. His father was a schoolteacher. During World War I, his family was deported from Serres, but returned at the end of the war.

From 1925, Papapetrou studied mechanical and electrical engineering at the National Technical University of Athens, graduating in 1930. While a student, he was an assistant in the mathematics department, and he started work as an engineer.

== Research ==
His start in physics, in 1934, was through graduate studies on solid state physics under Paul Peter Ewald enabled through a scholarship, at the Technical University of Stuttgart. While there, he started working with Helmut Hönl, who was instrumental in the development of his interest in theory of relativity. In 1935, he earned his PhD there, with a dissertation on Investigations on the dendrite growth of crystals, and subsequently returned to the Technical University in Athens as an assistant in electrical engineering.

In 1940−1946, he was professor of physics at the National Technical University of Athens, where he gave seminars on the theory of relativity, and worked in relative isolation during the German occupation of that country. After the end of the war, and in the preamble to the civil war that followed, he was fired from that post for his sympathies with the left-leaning resistance movement. As a result, in 1946, he moved to the Dublin Institute for Advanced Studies at the invitation of Erwin Schrödinger, with whom he worked on unified field theories.

From 1948 on, he worked at the University of Manchester where he was a colleague of Leon Rosenfeld and worked on the equations of motion of GR, as well as the equations of motion of particles with spin in GR.

In 1952–1961 he was a researcher at the Research Institute of Mathematics of the National Academy of Sciences in East Berlin, and from 1957 professor at the Humboldt University of Berlin where, among others, Georg Dautcourt and Hans-Jürgen Treder were his pupils.

During 1960–61, he was visiting a group of relativity theorists, including André Lichnerowicz and Yvonne Choquet-Bruhat. From 1962 he was at the Institute Henri Poincaré (IHP) in Paris. At the same time, he was research director of CNRS. Among others, he worked on elastic waves in gravitational radiation detectors, shells of matter and their gravitational collapse, the Newman−Penrose formalism and its identities, stationary axially symmetric gravitational fields, and gravitational and electromagnetic radiation fields.

In 1975, he became Director of the IHP Laboratory of Theoretical Physics, and in 1977 he retired, remaining scientifically active. He was a visiting scientist at Princeton (1964–65), the University of Vienna (1970–71), and Boston University (1972). He later took French citizenship. From 1971 on, he was one of the organizing committee members of the international conferences on general relativity and gravitation (GRG).

He died in Paris, on August 12, 1997.

== Selected works ==
Papapetrou has published two books,

- A. Papapetrou, Spezielle Relativitatstheorie, VEB Deutscher Verlag der Wissenschaften, 1967
- A. Papapetrou, Lectures on General Relativity, D. Reidel, Dordrecht, 1974. ISBN 9027705402

and over a hundred papers, including:

- H. Hönl and A. Papapetrou, Über die Selbstenergie und das Gravitationsfeld einer elektrischen Punktladung, Z f Phys 112 (1939) 65; doi:10.1007/BF01325637
- H. Hönl and A. Papapetrou, Über die innere Bewegung des Elektrons. I., Z f Phys 112 (1939) 512; doi:10.1007/BF01341246
- A. Papapetrou and H. Hönl, Über die innere Bewegung des Elektrons. II, Z f Phys 114 (1939) 478; doi:10.1007/BF01329528
- H. Hönl and A. Papapetrou, Über die innere Bewegung des Elektrons. III., Z f Phys 116 (1940) 153; doi:10.1007/BF01337382
- A. Papapetrou, Gravitationswirkungen zwischen Pol-Dipol-Teilchen, Z f Phys 116 (1940) 298; doi:10.1007/BF01341450
- Α. Papapetrou, E. Schrödinger, The Point-Charge in the Non-symmetric Field Theory, Nature 168 (1951) 40; doi:10.1038/168040a0
- Α. Papapetrou, A static solution of the equations of the gravitational field for an arbitrary charge distribution., Proc. Roy. Irish Acad. A 51 (1948) 191
- A. Papapetrou, Spinning test particles in general relativity., I. Proc. R. Soc. A 64, 248–258 (1952)
- A. Papapetrou, Eine rotationssymmetrische Lösung in der allgemeinen Relativitätstheorie, Ann. Phys. (Leipzig) 12, 309–315 (1953)
- A. Papapetrou, Quelques remarques sur les champs gravitationnels stationnaires. C. R. Acad. Sci. Paris 257, 2797–2800 (1963)
- A. Papapetrou, Champs gravitationnels stationnaires à symétrie axiale. C. R. Acad. Sci. Paris 285, 90–93 (1964)
- A. Papapetrou, Champs gravitationnels stationnaires à symétrie axiale. Ann. Inst. Henri Poincare IV, 83–105 (1966)
- A. Papapetrou, Eine rotationssymmetrische Lösung in der allgemeinen Relativitätstheorie, Ann. Phys. (Leipzig) 12, 309–315 (1953)
- A. Papapetrou, Eine Theorie des Gravitationsfeldes mit einer Feldfunktion, Z f Phys 139 (1954) 518; doi:10.1007/BF01374560

== See also ==
- Sudhansu Datta Majumdar
- Contributors to general relativity
