= Weyl–Lewis–Papapetrou coordinates =

Exact solution to Einstein's field equations

In general relativity, the Weyl–Lewis–Papapetrou coordinates are used in solutions to the vacuum region surrounding an axisymmetric distribution of mass–energy. They are named for Hermann Weyl, Thomas Lewis, and Achilles Papapetrou.

== Details ==
The square of the line element is of the form:

$$ds^2 = -e^{2\nu}dt^2 + \rho^2 B^2 e^{-2\nu}(d\phi - \omega dt)^2 + e^{2(\lambda - \nu)}(d\rho^2 + dz^2)$$

where $(t, \rho, \phi, z)$ are the cylindrical Weyl–Lewis–Papapetrou coordinates in $3+1$-dimensional spacetime, and $\lambda$, $\nu$, $\omega$, and $B$, are unknown functions of the spatial non-angular coordinates $\rho$ and $z$ only. Different authors define the functions of the coordinates differently.

== See also ==
- Introduction to the mathematics of general relativity
- Stress–energy tensor
- Metric tensor (general relativity)
- Relativistic angular momentum
- Weyl metrics
