= Argiris Papapetrou =

Greek basketball player

Argiris Papapetrou Αργύρης Παπαπέτρου
Personal information
- Born: February 21, 1965 (age 61) Aiginio, Greece
- Listed height: 6 ft 9 in (2.06 m)
- Listed weight: 245 lb (111 kg)

Career information
- Playing career: 1983–1997
- Position: Power forward / center
- Number: 10

Career history

Playing
- 1983–1985: Pierikos
- 1985–1994: Panathinaikos
- 1994–1996: Apollon Patras
- 1996–1997: Irakleio

Coaching
- 2005–2006: Panathinaikos Women

Career highlights
- As player: 2× Greek Cup winner (1986, 1993); 2× Greek League All-Star (1991, 1994 I)
Medals
Representing Greece
Men's basketball
Balkan Championship
Bronze medal – third place	1985 Romania

Argiris Papapetrou (alternate spellings: Argirios, Argyris, Argyrios) (Greek: Αργύρης Παπαπέτρου; born February 21, 1965) is a retired Greek professional basketball player and coach. At 6 ft 9 in (2.06 m) in height, he played at the power forward and center positions.

== Professional career ==
Papapetrou started his playing career with Pierikos. In 1985, he moved to Panathinaikos, and with them, he won the Greek Cup title in 1986 and 1993. In 1994, he moved to Apollon Patras, and in 1996, he joined Irakleio.

== National team career ==
Papapetrou was a member of the senior men's Greek national team. He played with Greece at the 1984 FIBA European Olympic Qualifying Tournament and the 1994 FIBA World Championship. He also played with Greece at the Balkan Championship in 1985 and 1990.

== Coaching career ==
After the end of his playing career, Papapetrou worked as a basketball coach. He was the head coach of Panathinaikos Women, during the 2005–06 season.

== Personal life ==
Papapetrou's sons, Ioannis Papapetrou and Georgios Papapetrou, are also professional basketball players.
