= Georgios Papapetrou =

Greek basketball player

Georgios Papapetrou Γιώργος Παπαπέτρου
Papagou
- Position: Point guard
- League: Greek A2 League

Personal information
- Born: November 23, 1991 (age 34) Athens, Greece
- Listed height: 6 ft 5 in (1.96 m)
- Listed weight: 200 lb (91 kg)

Career information
- College: Ranger (2010–2012); Franklin Pierce (2012–2014)
- NBA draft: 2014: undrafted
- Playing career: 2014–present

Career history
- 2014–2015: Koroivos Amaliadas
- 2015: Promitheas Patras
- 2015–2016: Ikaros Kallitheas
- 2016–2017: Ethnikos Piraeus
- 2017–present: Papagou

Georgios Papapetrou (alternate spelling: Giorgos) (Greek: Γιώργος Παπαπέτρου; born November 23, 1991, in Athens, Greece) is a Greek professional basketball player. He is 6 ft 5 in (1.96 m) tall, and he plays at the point guard position.

== College career ==
Papapetrou played college basketball at Ranger College, and at Franklin Pierce University.

== Professional career ==
In 2014, Papapetrou began his professional career with the Greek League club Koroivos Amaliadas. In 2015, he moved to Promitheas Patras. He then played with Ikaros Kallitheas, Ethnikos Piraeus and Papagou.

== Personal ==
Papapetrou's father, Argyris Papapetrou, was also a professional basketball player in Greece. His mother, Anastasia, played football in Greece. While his younger brother, Ioannis Papapetrou, is also a professional basketball player.
