= Hans-Jürgen Treder =

German theoretical physicist

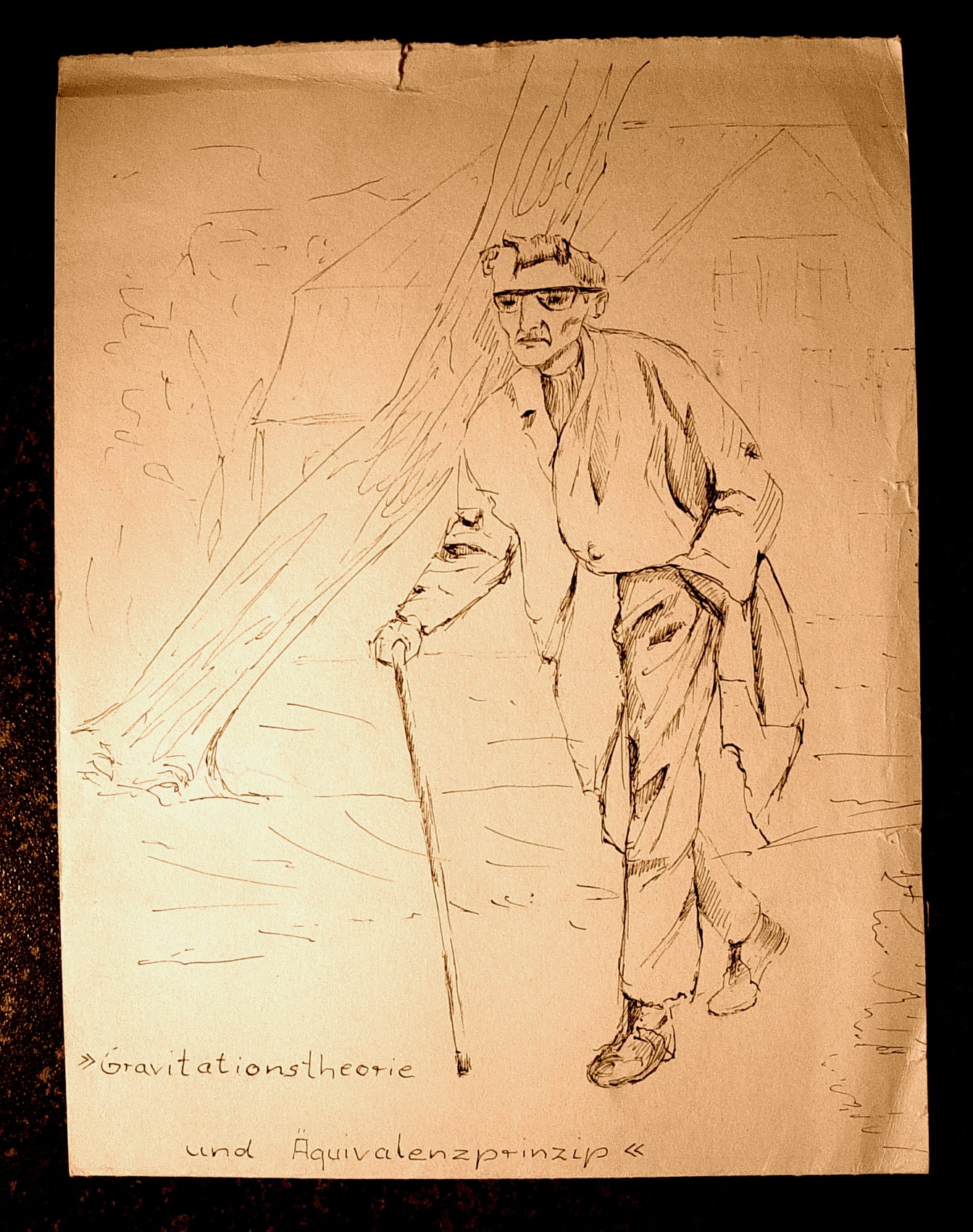
Hans-Jürgen Treder

Hans-Jürgen Treder (born 4 September 1928 in Berlin; died 18 November 2006 in Potsdam) was a German theoretical physicist and in the GDR, specializing in general relativity (and its extensions), astrophysics, and cosmology. He also had an interest in the history of science and philosophy.

== Life ==
=== Education ===
Treder took an early interest in physics, displaying talent in the subject. As a student in 1944, he sought contact with Werner Heisenberg in Berlin, later to meet and communicate with him. After the Second World War he studied at the Humboldt University of Berlin in physics and philosophy.

=== PhD and research ===
In 1956 he was awarded his doctorate from the Humboldt University of Berlin. In 1957, he became a research assistant at the Research Institute of Mathematics of the German Academy of Sciences at Berlin. Immediately after earning a Habilitation in 1962, in 1963 he became professor of theoretical physics at Humboldt University of Berlin and director of the Academy Institute of Pure Mathematics. With work on gravitational radiation at that time he earned international recognition. In 1965, he was instrumental in organizing the conference for the 50th anniversary of the publication of Einstein's field equations.

=== Positions and affiliations ===
In 1966 he became a full member of the German Academy of Sciences and was Director of the Berlin-Babelsberg Observatory of the Academy of Sciences. Following reorganization in 1969, he headed the newly established Central Institute for Astrophysics (ZIAP), in which the previously independent observatories in Potsdam, the Babelsberg Observatory, the Sonneberg Observatory and the Karl Schwarzschild Observatory, Tautenburg were summarized. Until 1973, he also led the research field of cosmic physics at the Academy of Sciences, in astrophysics and geophysics. Then he gave to health reasons and focused on the management of the ZIAP. He not only made it a center of theoretical gravitational physics, but also included magnetohydrodynamics (MHD, in collaboration with Max Steenbeck) - which played an important role in astrophysics on a par with the gravitational theory in the model training - and geophysics (in collaboration with Hans Ertel), which was formative in Potsdam later.

On Albert Einstein's 100th Birthday, 1979, he managed to secure Einstein's summer house in Caputh, Brandenburg as a guest of the Academy in consultation with the administrators of the estate of Otto Nathan and Einstein. In 1982 he handed over the ZIAP to his successor, Karl-Heinz Schmidt. Treder was director and founder of the Laboratory of Einstein Academy in Potsdam Caputh he remained until 1992. He has published in the last years of his life with his friend, the geophysicist Wilfried Schröder, many works in the Earth and space physics, including solar variability. In addition, the edition of the book Einstein and geophysics, as well as some volumes of the works of Hans Ertel. Focus of their work was the solar minima (Sporer, Maunder and Dalton minima) and the physical consequences of solar activity. Treder was chairman of the International Society "History of Geophysics and Cosmical Physics".

Treder enjoyed high reputation in the GDR (he received include the National Prize of the GDR) and the full confidence of the political leadership, enjoying privileges such as full freedom to travel and own chauffeur driven car. He dclined invitations to visit the West: he was not only an avowed Marxist, but also felt an affinity with the history of science in Berlin, about which he later wrote some books.

He lived later on the grounds of the Babelsberg Observatory, but was increasingly maverick and did not retain his leading role in the scientific organization in post-reunification Germany, from which he had anyway retired early as the 1980s, when he turned increasingly to the History of Science and the philosophy of science (conducting a correspondence with Karl Popper).

Treder was a member of the Leibniz-Sozietät.

== Works ==
He was very productive, publishing nearly 500 individual contributions and more than 20 monographs.

=== Monographs on gravitational physics ===
- Gravitational shock waves. Non-analytic wave solutions of Einstein's field equations, Akademie-Verlag, Berlin 1962
- H. J. Treder, H. H. V. Borzeszkowski, A. V. D. Merwe, Wolfgang Your Gray (1980). fundamental principles of general relativity theories: local and global aspects of gravitation and cosmology. Plenum Press, New York. Bibcode:1980fpgr.book.....T.
- H. J. Treder (1972). The relativity of inertia. Berlin.
- H. J. Treder (1971). Theory of gravitation and the principle of equivalence. Berlin: Akademie-Verlag.
- H. J. Treder, E. roundabout, D. E. Liebscher (1967). For Quantengeometrodynamik - Collected Works. Series of the Institute of Mathematics of the Academy of Sciences. Berlin: Akademie-Verlag.
- H. J. Treder; H.H. of Borzeszkowski (1988). The meaning of quantum gravity. Dordrecht, Reidel. Bibcode:1988mqg..book.....V.
- H. J. Treder; Jan Peter Mücket (1981). Greater Cosmic systems - the telescopic aspects of gravitation and inertia-free Gravidynamik. Publications of the Research Field Earth and Space Sciences. Akademie Verlag.
- H. J. Treder, M. Steenbeck (1984). possibilities of experimental gravity research. Berlin: Akademie-Verlag.

=== The history of science, philosophy of science ===
Some popular writings of Treder:

- H. J. Treder (1983). Great physicists and their problems - Studies in the History of Physics. Akademie Verlag.
- H. J. Treder (1982). Relativity and the Cosmos. Space and Time in physics, astronomy and cosmology. Vieweg, Wiesbaden.
- H. J. Treder (1974). Over principles of the dynamics of Einstein, Hertz, Mach and Poincare. WTB, Akademie Verlag. Berlin.
- H. J. Treder (1974). Philosophical problems of physical space: gravity, geometry, cosmology and relativity. Akademie Verlag.
- H. J. Treder (1968). Relativity and the Cosmos - Space and Time in physics, astronomy and cosmology. WTB, Akademie Verlag.
- W. Schröder (2005). Einstein and Geophysics. Bremen, Science Edition.

=== Books ===
- H. J. Treder (1980). Fundamental questions of physics - past, present and future of fundamental physics. WTB, Akademie Verlag.
- H. J. Treder (1975). Elemental cosmology. Akademie Verlag.
- H. J. Treder (1988). Elementary constants and what they mean. WTB, Akademie Verlag.
- H. J. Treder (1985). Counting and measuring. WTB, Akademie Verlag.
- H. J. Treder (1982). On the Unity of the exact sciences. WTB.
- H. J. Treder (1979). Over the physics. Akademie Verlag.
- H. J. Treder, with R. Rompe, W. Ebeling (1987). To the great Berlin Physics (lectures at the Annual Meeting 1987 of the Physical Society of the GDR in the jubilee year 750 Jahre Berlin), Leipzig, Teubner.

=== Essays ===
- V. W. Schroeder; H. J. Treder. "Zu Einsteins letzter Vorlesung - Beobachtbarkeit, Realitaet und Vollstaendigkeit in Quanten- und Relativitaetstheorie" [to Einstein's last lecture - observability, reality and completeness in quantum and relativity].
- V. W. Schroeder; H. J. Treder. "Naturwissenschaft und Religion" [Science and Religion].
- V. W. Schroeder; H. J. Treder. "The "Einstein-Laue" discussion".
- V. W. Schroeder; H. J.Treder. "Abschied von der Weltformel - Vor 100 Jahren wurde der deutsche Physiker Werner Heisenberg geboren" [Farewell to the World Formula - 100 years ago, the German physicist Werner Heisenberg was born].
- V. W. Schroeder; H. J. Treder. "Hans Ertel and Cosmology".
