= Sudhansu Datta Majumdar =

Indian physicist (1915–1997)

- Born: 1915; Sylhet, Assam Province, British India
- Died: 1997 (aged 81–82); Calcutta, India
- Education: Presidency College, Calcutta; Rajabazar Science College
- Known for: General relativity, Electrodynamics, Spectroscopy, Group Theory
- Scientific career
- Fields: Physics
- Workplaces: Calcutta University, IIT, Kharagpur, Visva Bharati

Sudhansu Datta Majumdar (1915 – 1997) was an Indian physicist, and faculty member of the Indian Institute of Technology, Kharagpur.

== Biography ==
Born in 1915 in Sylhet (now in Bangladesh), Sudhansu Datta Majumdar had his education in Sylhet; Presidency College, Calcutta, and University College of Science also called Rajabazar Science College, Calcutta University. In an academic career spanning several decades, he served in different capacities in various institutions. Beginning with a stint in the Palit Laboratory of Physics, Rajabazar Science College, Calcutta University, from where he wrote the now famous Majumdar–Papapetrou paper, he was appointed Lecturer in Physics in Calcutta University in 1951. Subsequently, he became a reader there in 1960. During 1956–57, he went to Cambridge University, United Kingdom, on an educational tour to interact with P. A. M. Dirac. In 1962, Majumdar obtained the rare honour of the degree of D.Sc. in Physics from Sc. College, Calcutta University, one of his thesis examiners being J.A. Wheeler. Three years later, in 1965, he joined IIT, Kharagpur, as a Professor of Physics where he served till 1975. His last academic appointment was, as a Professor of Mathematics in Visva Bharati, Shantiniketan. In 1974, he was invited by Yeshiva University, New York, to deliver a course of lectures. He visited the Mathematics Department, Monash University, Australia, between July and December 1976. Calcutta Mathematical Society elected him as their president in 1980. The diverse areas in which he contributed substantially include --- general relativity, electrodynamics, group theory and spectroscopy. He died in Calcutta in 1997.

== Majumdar–Papapetrou solution ==
The phenomenon of static equilibrium for a system of point charges is well known in Newtonian theory, where the mutual gravitational and electrostatic forces can be balanced by fine-tuning the charge suitably with the particle masses. The corresponding generalisation, in the form of static solutions of the coupled, source-free Einstein-Maxwell equations, was discovered by Majumdar and Papapetrou independently in 1947. These gravitational fields assume no spatial symmetry and also contain geodesics which are incomplete. While work continued on understanding these solutions better, a renewed interest in this metric was generated by the important observation of Israel and Wilson in 1972 that static black-hole spacetimes with the mass being equal to the magnitude of the charge are of Majumdar–Papapetrou form. In the same year, it was shown by Hartle and Hawking that these spacetimes can be analytically extended to electrovacuum black hole spacetimes with a regular domain of outer communication. They interpreted this as a system of charged black holes in equilibrium under their gravitational and electrical forces. Each one of these many black holes or the multi-black holes system has a spherical topology and hence is a fairly regular object. In a more recent development, the uniqueness of the metric was discussed by Heusler, Chrusciel and others. These and other aspects of the Majumdar–Papapetrou metric have attracted considerable attention on the classical side, as well as in the work and applications from the perspective of string theory. In particular, the mass equal to charge aspect of these models was used extensively in certain string theoretic considerations connected to black hole entropy and related issues.

Moreover, the geodesics of this spacetime was analysed by Contopoulos, and was found to exhibit chaotic behaviour, where the set of initial conditions of all classes of orbits formed a Cantor set.

A more mathematically rigorous analysis of the geometry of chaos in this spacetime was later studied by Yurtsever.

== Majumdar–Papapetrou geometries ==
Majumdar–Papapetrou geometries generalise axially symmetric solutions to Einstein-Maxwell equations found by Hermann Weyl to a completely nonsymmetric and general case. The line element is given by:

$$ds^2 = -U(x,y,z)^{-2}dt^2 + U(x,y,z)^2 (dx^2 + dy^2 + dz^2),$$

where the only nonvanishing component of the vector potential $A_{\mu}\$ is the scalar potential $\Phi (x)\$. The relation between the metric and the scalar potential is given by

$$\Phi(x) = A_{t}(x) = U^{-1}(x),$$

where the electrostatic field is normalised to unity at infinity. The source-free Einstein-Maxwell equations then reduce to the Laplace equation given by:

$$\Delta U(x,y,z) = \frac{\partial^2 U}{\partial x^2} + \frac{\partial^2 U}{\partial y^2} + \frac{\partial^2 U}{\partial z^2} = 0,$$

where U(x,y,z) can be extended in spatial directions until one encounters a singularity or U(x,y,z) vanishes.

It was later shown by Hartle and Hawking that these solutions can be "glued" together to construct multi-black-hole solutions of charged black holes. These charged black holes are in static equilibrium with each other with the gravitational and the electrostatic forces cancelling each other out. The Majumdar–Papapetrou solution, thus, can be seen as early example of BPS configuration where static equilibrium results due to the cancellation of opposing forces. Examples of such BPS configurations include cosmic strings (attractive gravitational force balances with the repulsive scalar force), monopoles, BPS configurations of D-branes (cancellation of NS-NS and RR forces, NS-NS being the gravitational force and RR being the generalisation of the electrostatic force), etc.

== Electrodynamics of crystalline media and the Cherenkov effect ==
During the fifties, there was a resurgence of interest in the Cherenkov effect both in its experimental and theoretical aspects. Professor Majumdar was fascinated by the problem, because it was perhaps the only classical electrodynamical derivation that fetched Nobel prizes in a world dominated by the Quantum. As was usual with him, he approached the problem in an absolutely novel way. Instead of studying the Cherenkov radiation field in the rest frame of the medium through which the charged particle whizzes by, he decided to jump to the rest frame of the charge. The great advantage of this approach is that the electromagnetic field becomes static and can be described by just two scalar potentials, which was a totally new formulation of the problem. However, the flowing medium now acquires a complicated magneto-electric character. This however came as a blessing in disguise, because it led to a discovery in the electrodynamics of crystalline media. Majumdar found that a most general doubly anisotropic medium with tensor permittivity and tensor permeability with non-parallel principal axes could sometimes behave like an 'isotropic' or 'uniaxial' medium as far as the structure of the Fresnel wave surface is concerned. Armed with this insight and his new formulation of the problem, he derived, for the first time, a closed expression for the Cherenkov output in a biaxial crystal in terms of elliptic functions.

His students and collaborators followed up his studies. A major contribution that resulted was the prediction of a new phenomenon called The Cherenkov analogue of conical refraction. A surprising system of intersecting Cherenkov rings in a biaxial crystal at precisely defined particle energies was predicted. These rings were later found in the photographs taken by V.P. Zrelov at the Proton Synchrotron facility at Dubna, Moscow.

== Theory of group representations ==
Professor Majumdar's work on group theory has its origins in one of his early papers on molecular spectroscopy where a novel method for deriving the Clebsch-Gordan series and coefficients of SU(2) was discussed. The new approach made it possible to establish a connection between the Clebsch-Gordan Coefficients (CGC) and the Gauss hypergeometric function which was eventually identified as the generating function of the CGC. The Majumdar form of the CGC of SU(2) has appeared in acclaimed textbooks. Barut and Wilson have extensively investigated the symmetry properties of the three non-trivial forms of the CGC, namely, the Wigner-Racah, the van der Waerden and the Majumdar form. The success of the above approach for SU(2) inspired Majumdar to extend his method and obtain a similar reduction for SU(3). The SU(3) generators were expressed as differential operators in four independent variables. In terms of these, the eigenvalue equation of the quadratic Casimir operator became a partial differential equation in four independent variables, the polynomial solutions of which, form the bases of an irreducible representation of SU(3).

The forms of the new operators made apparent the fact that the basis states of an irreducible representation of SU(3)are linear combinations of the CG series of SU(2) with the same value of j, m and j1 – j2. Obtaining the SU(2) basis for SU(3) was thereby shown to be closely related to the theory of coupling of two angular momenta. The basic states of SU(3) were later used in deriving the matrix elements of finite transformations of SU(3). Simple analytic continuation of Majumdar's generating function of the SU(2) CGC was later understood to be the 'master function' for the solution of several problems of non-compact groups such as SU(1,1) and SL(2,C). The interpretation and domain of the complex variables, however, change from case to case. For example, in the representation theory of SL(2,C) these represent a pair of complex numbers i.e. spinors transforming according to the fundamental representation of SL(2,C) and the complex conjugate respectively. On the other hand, for the CG problem of SU(1,1), they transform according to two distinct SU(1,1) groups.
