= Mathisson–Papapetrou–Dixon equations =

General relativity equation

In physics, specifically general relativity, the Mathisson–Papapetrou–Dixon equations describe the motion of a massive spinning body moving in a gravitational field. Other equations with similar names and mathematical forms are the Mathisson–Papapetrou equations and Papapetrou–Dixon equations. All three sets of equations describe the same physics.

These equations are named after Myron Mathisson, William Graham Dixon, and Achilles Papapetrou, who worked on them.

Throughout, this article uses the natural units c = G = 1, and tensor index notation.

== Mathisson–Papapetrou–Dixon equations ==
The Mathisson–Papapetrou–Dixon (MPD) equations for a mass $m$ spinning body are

$$\begin{align}
\frac{D k_\nu}{D\tau} + \frac 12 S^{\lambda\mu } R_{\lambda \mu\nu \rho}V^\rho &= 0, \\
\frac{D S^{\lambda\mu}}{D\tau} + V^\lambda k^\mu - V^\mu k^\lambda &= 0.
\end{align}$$

Here $\tau$ is the proper time along the trajectory, $k_\nu$ is the body's four-momentum

$$k_\nu= \int_{t=\text{const}} {T^0}_\nu \sqrt{g} d^3 x,$$

the vector $V^\mu$ is the four-velocity of some reference point $X^\mu$ in the body, and the skew-symmetric tensor $S^{\mu\nu}$ is the angular momentum

$$S^{\mu\nu} = \int_{t=\text{const}}\left\{\left(x^\mu - X^\mu\right)T^{0\nu} - \left(x^\nu - X^\nu\right)T^{0\mu}\right\} \sqrt{g}d^3 x$$

of the body about this point. In the time-slice integrals we are assuming that the body is compact enough that we can use flat coordinates within the body where the energy-momentum tensor $T^{\mu\nu}$ is non-zero.

As they stand, there are only ten equations to determine thirteen quantities. These quantities are the six components of $S^{\lambda\mu}$, the four components of $k_\nu$ and the three independent components of $V^\mu$. The equations must therefore be supplemented by three additional constraints which serve to determine which point in the body has velocity $V^\mu$. Mathison and Pirani originally chose to impose the condition $V^\mu S_{\mu\nu} = 0$ which, although involving four components, contains only three constraints because $V^\mu S_{\mu\nu}V^\nu$ is identically zero. This condition, however, does not lead to a unique solution and can give rise to the mysterious "helical motions". The Tulczyjew–Dixon condition $k_\mu S^{\mu\nu} = 0$ does lead to a unique solution as it selects the reference point $X^\mu$ to be the body's center of mass in the frame in which its momentum is $(k_0, k_1, k_2, k_3) = (m, 0, 0, 0)$.

Accepting the Tulczyjew–Dixon condition $k_\mu S^{\mu\nu}=0$, we can manipulate the second of the MPD equations into the form

$$\frac{D S_{\lambda\mu }}{D\tau} + \frac 1{m^2}\left(S_{\lambda\rho} k_\mu \frac{D k^\rho}{D\tau} + S_{\rho \mu} k_\lambda \frac{D k^\rho }{D\tau}\right) = 0,$$

This is a form of Fermi–Walker transport of the spin tensor along the trajectory – but one preserving orthogonality to the momentum vector $k^\mu$ rather than to the tangent vector $V^\mu = dX^\mu/d\tau$. Dixon calls this M-transport.

== See also ==
- Introduction to the mathematics of general relativity
- Geodesic equation
- Pauli–Lubanski pseudovector
- Test particle
- Relativistic angular momentum
- Center of mass (relativistic)
