= Ioannis Papapetrou =

Greek basketball player (born 1994)

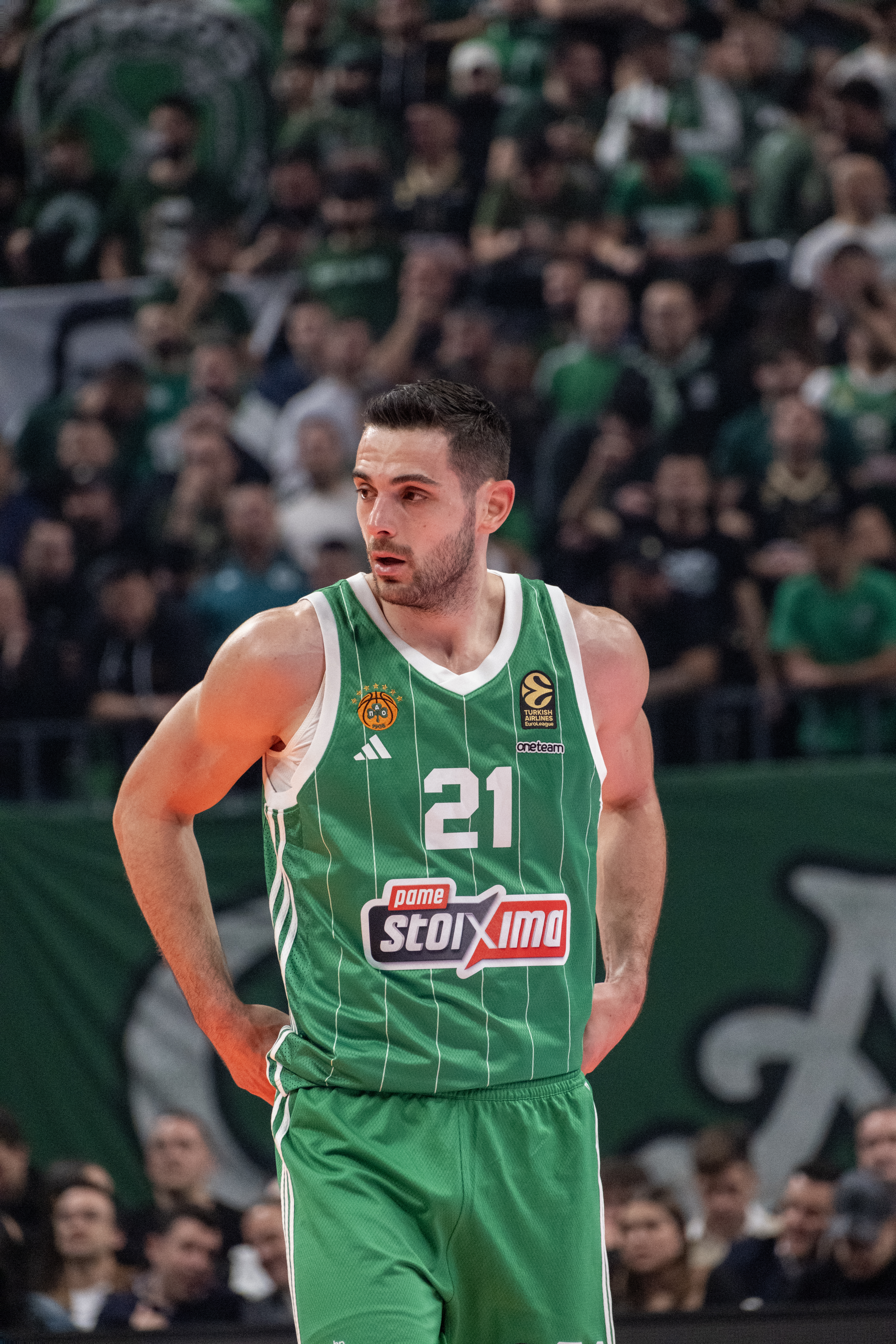
- Papapetrou with Panathinaikos in 2025

Personal information
- Born: March 30, 1994 (age 32) Patras, Greece
- Listed height: 6 ft 9 in (2.06 m)
- Listed weight: 233 lb (106 kg)

Career information
- High school: Florida Air Academy (Melbourne, Florida)
- College: Texas (2012–2013)
- NBA draft: 2014: undrafted
- Playing career: 2013–2025
- Position: Small forward / power forward
- Number: 9, 6, 10, 21

Career history
- 2013–2018: Olympiacos
- 2018–2022: Panathinaikos
- 2022–2023: Partizan
- 2023–2025: Panathinaikos

Career highlights
- EuroLeague champion (2024); ABA League champion (2023); 6× Greek League champion (2015, 2016, 2019–2021, 2024); 3× Greek Cup winner (2019, 2021, 2025); Greek Supercup winner (2021); Greek League MVP (2021); Greek League Finals MVP (2021); 2× All-Greek League Team (2019, 2021); Greek Cup Finals MVP (2021); Greek League Best Young Player (2016)

Ioannis Papapetrou (Greek: Ιωάννης Παπαπέτρου; born March 30, 1994) is a Greek former professional basketball player. Standing at 206 cm (6’9’’) tall, he played at both the small forward and power forward positions.

== Early career ==
Papapetrou, who is considered to be one of the most talented Greek players that was born in the 1994 age class, along with players like Giannis Antetokounmpo and Lefteris Bochoridis, began his basketball playing career with the youth teams of the Ilysiakos club in Athens, Greece. He played for 5 seasons in Greek junior competitions with Ilysiakos. He then spent his junior and senior years of high school, playing basketball at the Florida Air Academy, in Melbourne, Florida.

== College career ==
In 2012, Papapetrou joined the Texas Longhorns men's basketball team of the University of Texas. He played one season of college basketball with the Longhorns and averaged 8.3 points, 4.4 rebounds, and 1.2 assists per game, in 24.3 minutes per game. He played in a total of 34 games in the NCAA.

== Professional career ==
=== Olympiacos ===
Papapetrou's professional career began with the Greek League team Olympiacos in 2013, when he signed a 5-year deal with Olympiacos, in late August 2013, which was his first pro deal. The contract was said to be worth $2 million net income. The contract included an NBA buyout option after the contract's third season.

With Olympiacos, he won the Greek League championship in 2015 and 2016. In 2016, he was named the Greek League Best Young Player.

=== Panathinaikos ===
On July 8, 2018, Papapetrou declined Olympiacos's renewal proposal and became a free agent. Two days later, he signed with Olympiacos' arch-rivals, Panathinaikos, on a three-year deal.

On February 17, 2019, he won his first title with Panathinaikos, after beating PAOK in the 2019 Greek Cup Final, which was held at Heraklion Indoor Sports Arena. Papapetrou had 10 points, 6 rebounds, 2 assists, 2 steals, and 2 blocks in that game. Four months later, Papapetrou was crowned Greek Basket League champion, after Panathinaikos swept Promitheas Patras in the league's finals.

Prior to the 2020–21 season, Papapetrou became the team's captain after the departure of Nick Calathes. He averaged 12.1 points and 4.1 rebounds per game. On July 11, 2021, Papapetrou officially renewed his contract with the Greek club for an additional two years.

On July 15, 2022, Papapetrou parted ways with Panathinaikos after four seasons together.

=== Partizan ===
On July 19, 2022, Papapetrou signed a two-year contract with Serbian powerhouse Partizan, under coach Željko Obradović. During the 2022–23 season, Partizan was eliminated from Real Madrid in a tight 3-2 playoffs series. In 38 EuroLeague games, Papapetrou averaged 5.4 points and 2.3 rebounds in 20 minutes per contest.

Partizan ended the 2022–23 season by lifting the ABA League championship trophy, after a victorious 3–2 series against Crvena zvezda in the finals.

On July 12, 2023, Papapetrou amicably parted ways with the Serbian powerhouse.

=== Return to Panathinaikos ===
On July 12, 2023, Papapetrou made his return to Panathinaikos, signing a two-year contract.

On June 22, 2025, Papapetrou announced his retirement from basketball with a message on his Instagram account, due to his injuries the past few years, which lead him to end his career early, at the age of 31.

== National team career ==
=== Greek junior national team ===
As a member of the Greek junior national teams, Papapetrou played at the 2009 FIBA Europe Under-16 Championship. He also played at the 2010 FIBA Europe Under-16 Championship, where he averaged 11.4 points, 4.6 rebounds, and 2.3 assists, in 32.1 minutes per game. He also played at the 2013 FIBA Europe Under-20 Championship, where he averaged 15.9 points, 5.3 rebounds, and 1.6 assists, in 33.0 minutes per game.

=== Greek senior national team ===
Papapetrou is also a member of the senior men's Greek national basketball team. He was selected to Greece's 12 man roster for the 2016 Turin FIBA World Olympic Qualifying Tournament. He also played at the EuroBasket 2017, and the 2019 FIBA World Cup qualification.

== Personal life ==
Papapetrou's nickname is "Papi". His father, Argiris Papapetrou, was also a professional basketball player, who played a decade for Panathinaikos and the Greece national basketball team. His mother, Anastasia, played football in Greece. While his older brother, Georgios Papapetrou, is also a professional basketball player.

== Career statistics ==
Legend
GP	Games played	GS	Games started	MPG	Minutes per game
FG%	Field-goal percentage	3P%	3-point field-goal percentage	FT%	Free-throw percentage
RPG	Rebounds per game	APG	Assists per game	SPG	Steals per game
BPG	Blocks per game	PPG	Points per game	PIR	Performance index rating
**Bold**	Career high

=== EuroLeague ===
†	Denotes seasons in which Papapetrou won the EuroLeague

Year	Team	GP	GS	MPG	FG%	3P%	FT%	RPG	APG	SPG	BPG	PPG	PIR
2013–14	Olympiacos	12	6	10.3	**.568**	.478	.400	1.4	.3	.3	.2	4.6	3.7
2014–15	Olympiacos	11	0	10.4	.485	.400	.500	1.3	.4	.4	—	3.6	2.1
2015–16	Olympiacos	24	11	19.0	.432	.400	.692	2.7	.7	.7	.3	5.7	4.8
2016–17	Olympiacos	36	6	15.9	.396	.333	.688	2.6	.5	.5	.3	4.4	3.8
2017–18	Olympiacos	31	12	22.0	.413	.286	.667	3.6	.7	.4	.3	6.8	6.1
2018–19	Panathinaikos	28	22	25.5	.503	.333	.673	**4.2**	1.1	**.8**	**.5**	9.0	10.4
2019–20	Panathinaikos	27	24	27.9	.556	.367	.606	4.1	.8	.7	**.5**	10.9	**11.2**
2020–21	Panathinaikos	27	**26**	**30.6**	.403	.366	.730	4.1	2.4	.6	.1	**12.1**	10.6
2021–22	Panathinaikos	23	20	29.0	.411	.252	**.800**	3.2	**2.5**	.4	.1	12.0	11.0
2022–23	Partizan	**38**	24	20.6	.410	.368	.722	2.3	.9	.4	.2	5.4	5.1
2023–24†	Panathinaikos	16	4	17.1	.492	**.516**	**.800**	2.0	.7	.2	.2	5.6	5.4
Career		273	155	21.5	.522	.346	.704	3.1	1.0	.5	.2	7.5	7.0

=== Domestic leagues ===
Year	Team	League	GP	MPG	FG%	3P%	FT%	RPG	APG	SPG	BPG	PPG
2013–14	(Greece) Olympiacos	GBL	25	13.3	.411	.267	.696	2.4	.7	.3	.2	4.8
2014–15	(Greece) Olympiacos	GBL	10	12.8	.459	.214	.300	2.6	.7	.3	—	4.0
2015–16	(Greece) Olympiacos	GBL	34	20.5	.474	.350	.569	3.4	1.1	.7	.4	7.3
2016–17	(Greece) Olympiacos	GBL	33	18.2	.464	.318	.594	3.5	.6	.4	.5	6.9
2017–18	(Greece) Olympiacos	GBL	32	20.4	.549	.444	.706	4.5	1.3	.4	.2	8.9
2018–19	(Greece) Panathinaikos	GBL	26	21.1	.503	.361	.711	3.9	1.8	.8	.3	8.1
2019–20	(Greece) Panathinaikos	GBL	18	20.3	.575	.400	.656	3.1	2.1	.6	.3	9.7
2020–21	(Greece) Panathinaikos	GBL	28	25.1	.523	.416	.864	4.1	3.2	.6	.2	13.9
2021–22	(Greece) Panathinaikos	GBL	25	26.0	.457	.413	.776	3.9	2.6	.5	.3	13.4
2022–23	(Serbia) Partizan	ABA	34	18.6	.491	.422	.755	2.3	1.4	.3	.1	6.5
2023–24	(Greece) Panathinaikos	GBL	23	16.9	.453	.429	.643	2.2	.8	.2	.0	5.3

=== College ===
Year	Team	GP	GS	MPG	FG%	3P%	FT%	RPG	APG	SPG	BPG	PPG
2012–13	Texas	34	25	24.3	.432	.359	.583	4.4	1.2	.6	.7	8.3
Career		34	25	24.3	.432	.359	.583	4.4	1.2	.6	.7	8.3
