= Luka Dončić =

Slovenian basketball player (born 1999)

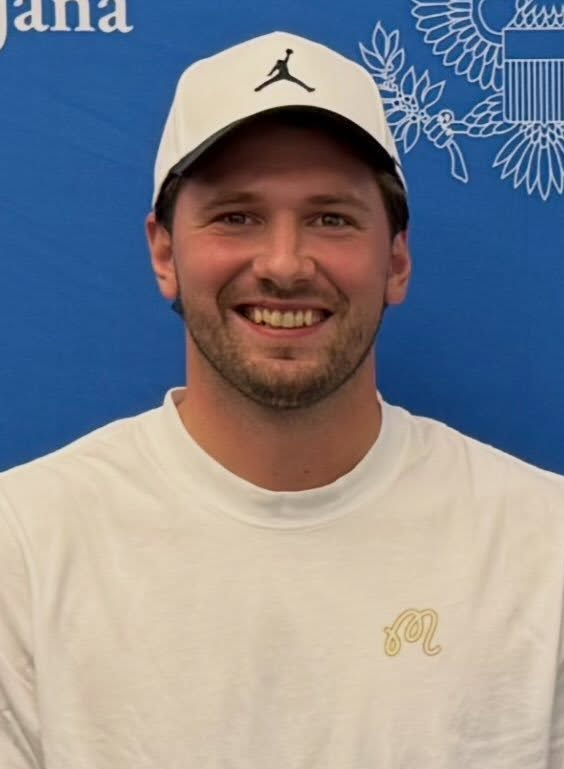
- Dončić in 2026

No. 77 – Los Angeles Lakers
- Position: Point guard / small forward
- League: NBA

Personal information
- Born: February 28, 1999 (age 27) Ljubljana, Slovenia
- Listed height: 6 ft 8 in (2.03 m)
- Listed weight: 230 lb (104 kg)

Career information
- NBA draft: 2018: 1st round, 3rd overall pick
- Drafted by: Atlanta Hawks
- Playing career: 2015–present

Career history
- 2015–2018: Real Madrid
- 2018–2025: Dallas Mavericks
- 2025–present: Los Angeles Lakers

Career highlights
- 6× NBA All-Star (2020–2024, 2026); 6× All-NBA First Team (2020–2024, 2026); NBA Rookie of the Year (2019); NBA All-Rookie First Team (2019); 2× NBA scoring champion (2024, 2026); NBA Western Conference finals MVP (2024); EuroLeague champion (2018); EuroLeague MVP (2018); EuroLeague Final Four MVP (2018); All-EuroLeague First Team (2018); 2× EuroLeague Rising Star (2017, 2018); EuroLeague 2010–2020 All-Decade Team (2020); EuroLeague 25th Anniversary Team (2025); Euroscar Player of the Year (2019); 3× Liga ACB champion (2015, 2016, 2018); Liga ACB MVP (2018); All-Liga ACB First Team (2018); 2× ACB Best Young Player (2017, 2018); 3× ACB All-Young Players Team (2016–2018); 2× Spanish King's Cup winner (2016, 2017); FIBA Intercontinental Cup champion (2015); Slovenian Sportsman of the Year (2018)
- Stats at NBA.com
- Stats at Basketball Reference
Medals
Men's basketball
Representing Slovenia
EuroBasket
Gold medal – first place	2017 Finland–Israel–Romania–Turkey

Luka Dončić (/ˈluːkə ˈdɒntʃɪtʃ/ LOO-kə DON-chitch; Slovene: [ˈlùːka ˈdòːntʃitʃ]; born February 28, 1999) is a Slovenian professional basketball player for the Los Angeles Lakers of the National Basketball Association (NBA). He is a six-time NBA All-Star and six-time All-NBA First Team member. He also represents the Slovenian national team. Nicknamed “Luka Magic,” he is regarded as one of the greatest European players of all time.

Dončić was drafted third overall by the Atlanta Hawks in the 2018 NBA draft and then traded to the Dallas Mavericks. Dončić was unanimously selected to the NBA All-Rookie First Team and won Rookie of the Year for the 2018–19 season. In the 2023–24 season he led the NBA in scoring averaging 33.9 points per game and led the Mavericks to the NBA Finals, where they fell to the Boston Celtics in five games. Dončić was then traded to the Los Angeles Lakers in the middle of the 2024–25 season in a controversial blockbuster trade that is regarded as one of the most shocking and unexpected trades in American sports history. In the 2025–26 season he led the NBA in scoring for a second time averaging 33.5 points per game. Doncic ranks seventh in NBA career triple-doubles.

Dončić was a youth player for Union Olimpija before joining the youth academy of Real Madrid. In 2015, he made his debut for the academy's senior team at age 16, becoming the youngest in club history. He made his senior debut for Slovenia in 2016 at only 17 years of age. He later helped his country win its first EuroBasket title, in 2017, while also being named to the All-Tournament Team. Dončić led Madrid to the 2018 EuroLeague title, winning the EuroLeague MVP and the Final Four MVP. He was named the ACB Most Valuable Player and won back-to-back EuroLeague Rising Star and ACB Best Young Player awards. Dončić was also selected to the EuroLeague 2010–20 All-Decade Team.

== Early life ==
Dončić was born in Ljubljana to Mirjam Poterbin, an owner of beauty salons, and Saša Dončić, a basketball coach and former player. His mother is Slovenian, and his father is a Slovenian of Serbian descent from Kosovo. His parents filed for divorce in 2008, with custody and legal guardianship granted to his mother.

According to his family, Dončić first touched a basketball when he was seven months old and frequently played with a miniature hoop in his room by age one. Dončić played various sports in his childhood, including football, which he later quit after growing too tall. At age seven, Dončić began playing organized basketball at a primary school in Ljubljana. His opponents at the time were up to 10 years old, as Dončić reflected: "I was always training and playing with older kids who had much more experience than me. Many of them were bigger and faster than me too, so I had to beat them with my brain." Dončić admired Greek basketball player Vassilis Spanoulis from his early teenage years, stating that he was "enchanted" by him. Dončić wore the number 7 at Real Madrid in honor of Spanoulis. Dončić also grew up admiring the American basketball player LeBron James.

== Youth career ==
=== Union Olimpija ===
When Dončić was eight, his father started playing for his hometown club Union Olimpija. Olimpija Basketball School coach Grega Brezovec invited Dončić to practice with players his age. Only 16 minutes into his first training session, the coaching staff moved Dončić to the 11-year-old group. Starting in the next session, he primarily practiced with Olimpija's under-14 team. Still, due to league rules, Dončić only played for the club's under-12 selection team, coming off the bench against opponents three or four years older than him. Despite his exclusion from under-14 games at the time, Dončić often asked to attend practice, even when his coach asked him to stay home.

Representing Olimpija at the under-14 Vasas Intesa Sanpaolo Cup in Budapest in September 2011, Dončić was named the most valuable player (MVP) despite finishing as runners-up to FC Barcelona. In February 2012, he was loaned to Spanish club Real Madrid for the Minicopa Endesa, an under-14 Spanish club competition. Dončić averaged 13.0 points, 4.0 rebounds, 2.8 assists and 3.3 steals per game to win tournament MVP honors, leading Real Madrid to a second-place finish. In April 2012, he participated in the under-13 Lido di Roma Tournament for Olimpija, finishing as MVP and leading scorer with 34.5 points per game. In the semifinal round of the event against Victoria Fermo, Dončić posted 29 points and 15 rebounds. In a title-clinching win over Lazio, he erupted for 54 points, 11 rebounds and 10 assists.

=== Real Madrid ===
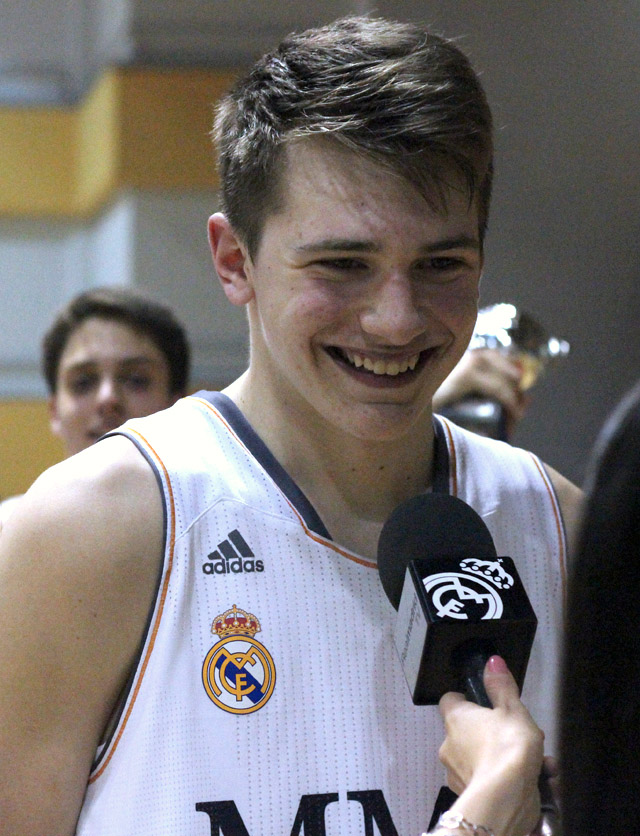
Dončić after a youth game with Real Madrid in May 2014

In September 2012, at 13 years of age, Dončić signed a five-year contract with Real Madrid, immediately standing out on the under-16 team with coach Paco Redondo. Dončić moved to Madrid, living with football and basketball prospects. In February 2013, he led Real Madrid to a Minicopa Endesa win, averaging 24.5 points, 13 rebounds, four assists and six steals per game. In the tournament's final game, Dončić had 25 points, 16 rebounds and five steals to defeat FC Barcelona and win MVP honors. In March, he earned MVP accolades of the under-16 Spain Championship, scoring 25 points in a championship game win over the Gran Canaria youth team.

In the 2014–15 season, Dončić mainly played with Real Madrid's under-18 and reserve teams. He averaged 13.5 points, 5.9 rebounds and 3.1 assists with the reserve team, helping them win Group B of the Liga EBA, the amateur fourth-division of Spanish basketball. By the end of the season, Dončić earned all-league honorable mention accolades from the basketball website Eurobasket.com. In January 2015, Dončić won the under-18 Ciutat de L'Hospitalet Tournament and was selected to the All-Tournament Team, despite being two years younger than the rest of the team. On January 6, against the youth team of his former club Union Olimpija, he posted a double-double of 13 points, 13 rebounds, four assists and four steals. In May 2015, Dončić won the under-18 Next Generation Tournament, for which he was selected MVP after helping defeat defending champions Crvena zvezda Belgrade in the final.

== Professional career ==
=== Real Madrid (2015–2018) ===
==== 2015–16 season: Early years ====
On April 30, 2015, Dončić made his professional debut for Real Madrid in the Liga ACB against Unicaja, making his only three-point attempt in under two minutes of playing time. At 16 years, two months and two days of age, Dončić became the youngest player to ever play for Real Madrid in the ACB and the third-youngest debutant in league history, behind only Ricky Rubio and Ángel Rebolo. Dončić played five games in the 2014–15 ACB season, averaging 1.6 points and 1.2 rebounds in 4.8 minutes per game.

In the 2015–16 season, Dončić became a regular member of Real Madrid's senior team. He played against the Boston Celtics in an NBA preseason game on October 8, 2015, collecting four rebounds, an assist and a block. On October 16, at age 16, Dončić debuted in the EuroLeague, scoring two points in a loss to Khimki. He became the 21st player ever to debut in the EuroLeague before turning 17. On October 18, Dončić recorded 10 points and four rebounds in a 94–61 victory over Gipuzkoa. On November 29, he posted a season-high 15 points, six rebounds and four assists against Bilbao. With the performance, Dončić set a new ACB record for most points and the highest Performance Index Rating (PIR) in a game for players under age 17. He scored 12 points and grabbed five rebounds on January 7, 2016, against CSKA Moscow in the EuroLeague. After a Real Madrid time-out in the second quarter of the game, Dončić made three consecutive three-pointers, recording nine points in two minutes. Through 39 games in the 2015–16 ACB season, he averaged 4.5 points, 2.6 rebounds and 1.7 assists. In 12 EuroLeague games, Dončić recorded 3.5 points, 2.3 rebounds and 2.0 assists per game.

==== 2016–17 season: Rise to prominence ====
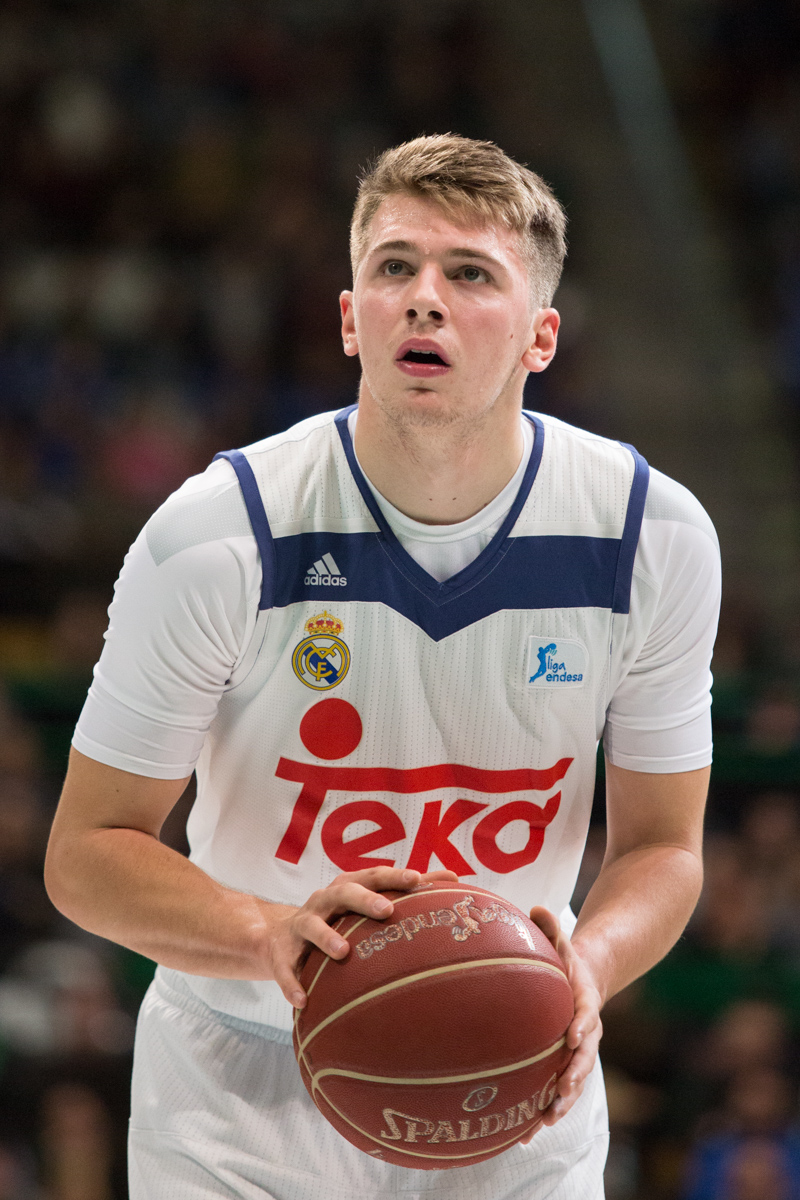
Dončić with Real Madrid in 2017

Dončić made his 2016–17 season debut on September 30, 2016, against Unicaja, recording six points and four assists in 19 minutes. He collected three points, five rebounds and four assists in an NBA preseason win on October 3, 2016, over the Oklahoma City Thunder. On December 4, Dončić posted a double-double of 23 points and 11 assists, both season highs, in a 92–76 victory over Montakit Fuenlabrada. The game earned him his first ACB player of the week honor. Dončić scored a team-high 17 points in a EuroLeague victory over Žalgiris Kaunas on December 8, 2016. After recording 16 points, six rebounds, five assists and three steals in a 95–72 victory over Brose Bamberg on December 22, he was named MVP of the Round in the EuroLeague, becoming the youngest player ever to do so. Dončić earned the same honor on January 14, 2017, after posting 10 points, 11 rebounds and eight assists to help beat Maccabi Tel Aviv. On February 9, Dončić recorded five points, seven rebounds and 11 assists to defeat UNICS Kazan. He scored a season-high 23 points on February 18, in the Spanish King's Cup against Baskonia. After scoring 13 points and grabbing eight rebounds in the 2017 EuroLeague Playoffs against Darüşşafaka on April 26, Dončić shared MVP of the Round accolades with two other players. Two days later, he won the award outright, posting 11 points, five rebounds and seven assists to lead Real Madrid to a EuroLeague Final Four berth. Through 42 ACB games in the season, Dončić averaged 7.5 points, 4.4 rebounds and 3.0 assists. Through 35 EuroLeague contests, he averaged 7.8 points, 4.5 rebounds and 4.2 assists per game. Dončić was named EuroLeague Rising Star by a unanimous vote and claimed the ACB Best Young Player award.

==== 2017–18 season: MVP season ====
Dončić assumed a more significant role for Real Madrid entering the 2017–18 season after the team's star player Sergio Llull suffered a torn ACL during EuroBasket 2017. In his season debut on October 1, 2017, he recorded eight points, six rebounds and four assists in a 94–88 victory over MoraBanc Andorra. On October 12, Dončić scored a career-high 27 points in his first EuroLeague game of the season to help defeat Anadolu Efes. Dončić nearly recorded a triple-double against Valencia in his next game, with 16 points, 10 assists and seven rebounds. On October 24, he was named EuroLeague MVP of the Round after erupting for 27 points, eight rebounds, five assists and three steals. Dončić was named MVP of the Round again two days later, eclipsing his career-best score with 28 points in an 87–66 win over Žalgiris Kaunas, also grabbing nine rebounds and four assists in the game. At the end of October, he earned EuroLeague MVP of the Month honors, becoming the youngest player to win the award. On December 8, Dončić set a career high in scoring with 33 points, six rebounds and four assists against Olympiacos Piraeus. He led Real Madrid to a 79–77 victory over defending EuroLeague champion Fenerbahçe Doğuş on December 28, contributing 20 points, 10 assists and eight rebounds. Following a 24-point outburst versus Movistar Estudiantes on December 31, Dončić was selected as Player of the Round in the ACB. He was later named ACB Player of the Month for December, becoming the award's youngest recipient.

Dončić versus Anadolu Efes in 2017
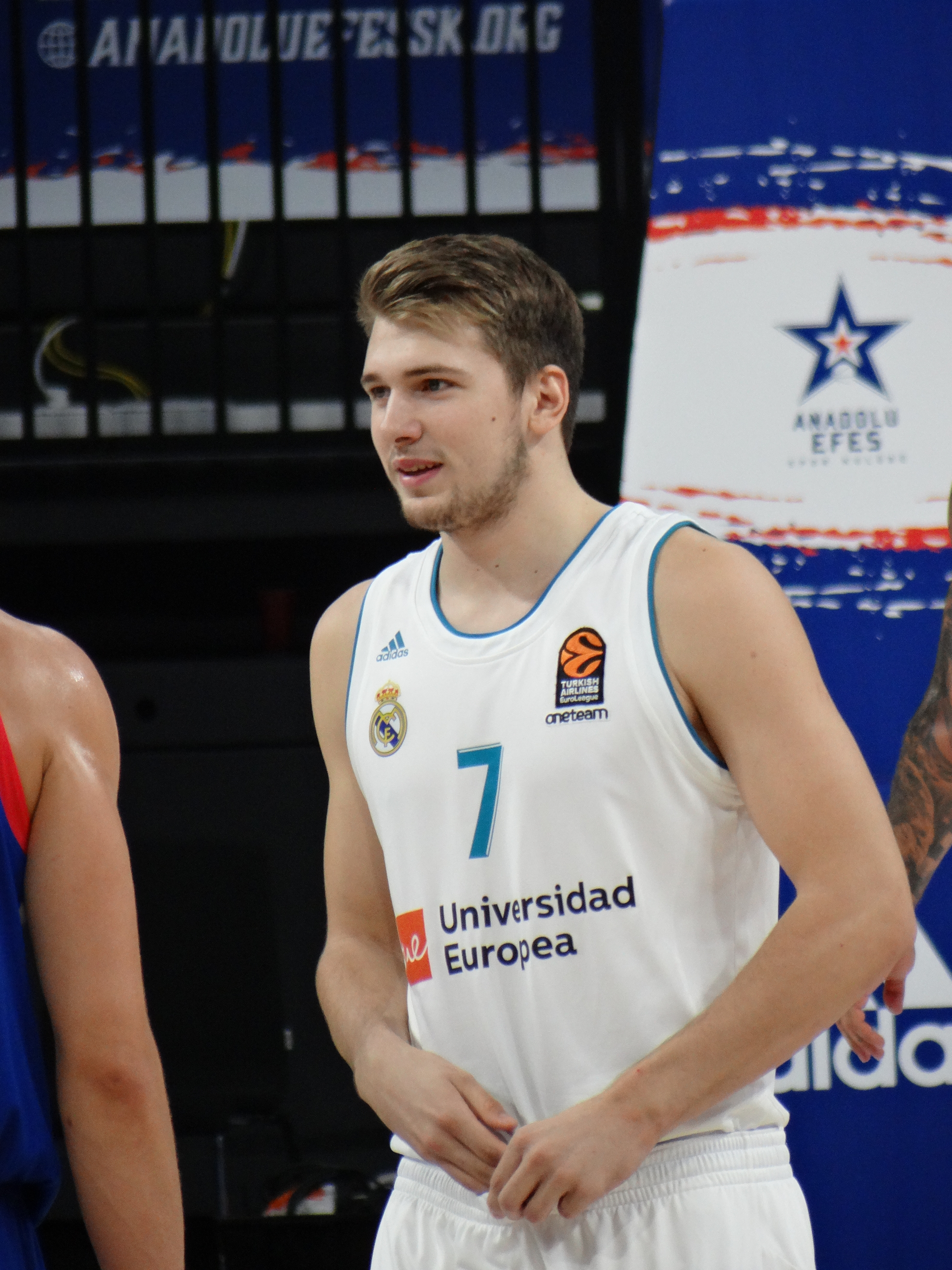
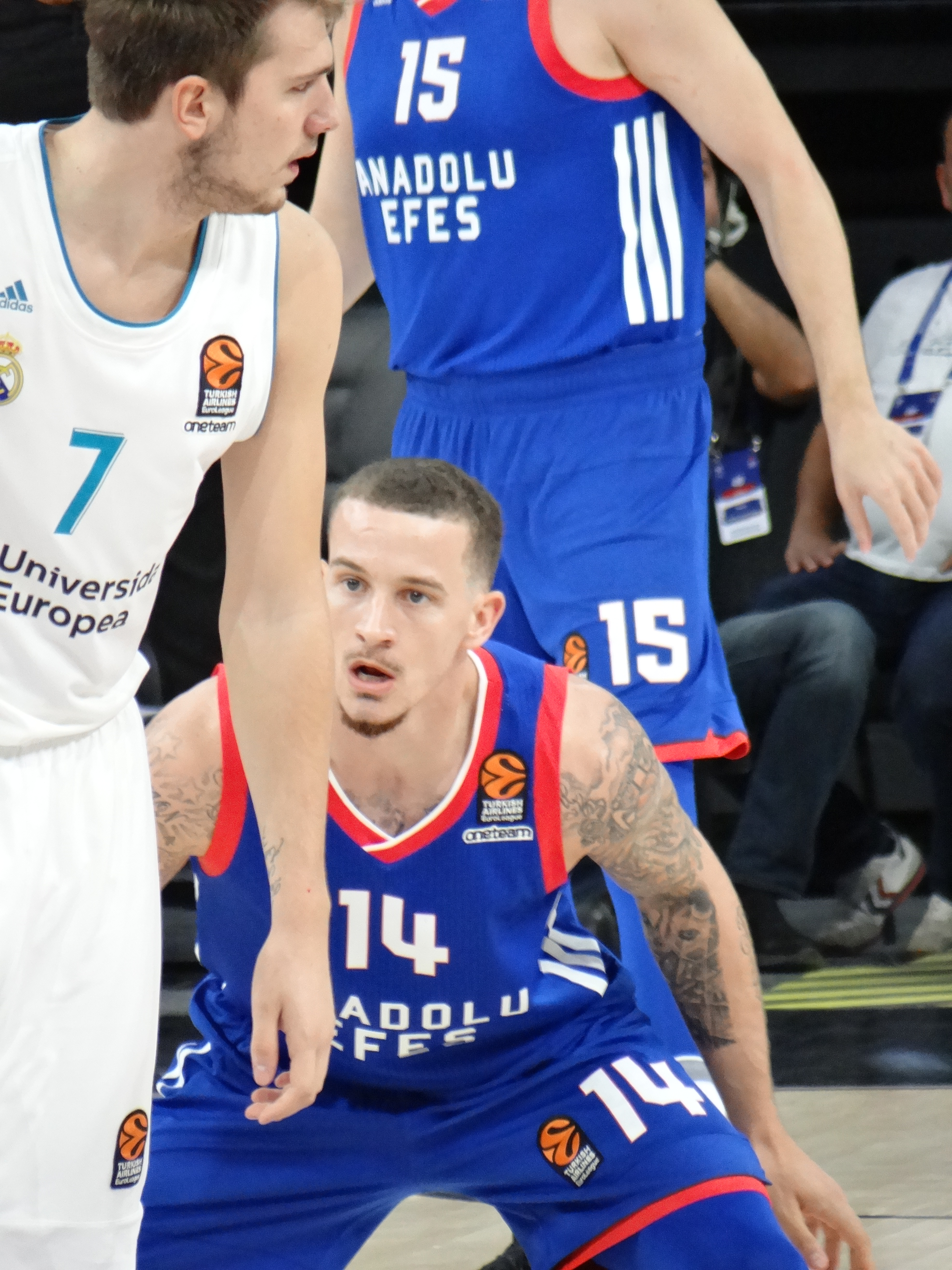
Dončić (left) with Real Madrid; (right) guarded by Josh Adams

On February 9, 2018, Dončić led his team with 27 points in a losing effort to Olympiacos, 80–79. Dončić had another strong performance on February 17 against Iberostar Tenerife in the 2018 Spanish King's Cup, posting 17 points, seven rebounds, five assists and four steals. On March 30, 2018, Dončić scored 24 points, grabbed nine rebounds, and made a game-winning three-pointer under a second left in regulation to beat Crvena zvezda Belgrade, 82–79. On May 9, he recorded 17 points, 10 rebounds and 10 assists in 22 minutes against Real Betis Energía Plus, for the first triple-double in the ACB since the 2006–07 season, seventh in league history. Dončić finished with 16 points, seven rebounds and two assists on May 18, in a 92–83 victory over CSKA Moscow in the EuroLeague semifinals. On May 20, he guided Real Madrid to a EuroLeague finals victory over Fenerbahçe Doğuş. Dončić was subsequently named EuroLeague Final Four MVP after scoring 15 points. He won the EuroLeague MVP award, being its youngest winner, after averaging 16 points, 4.9 rebounds and 4.3 assists per game over 33 EuroLeague games and leading the league in PIR. Dončić also repeated as the EuroLeague Rising Star, becoming the third back-to-back winner. Not only that, but he earned the ACB Best Young Player and MVP accolades after helping his team defeat Kirolbet Baskonia in the league finals. On June 29, 2018, Dončić parted ways with Real Madrid.

==== Accolades ====
In November 2019, Dončić was nominated to the EuroLeague 2010–20 All-Decade Team. In March 2020, he was selected for the 2010–20 All-Decade Team.

On March 23, 2021, the Real Madrid Football Club named Dončić and Spanish rally driver Carlos Sainz Sr. as honorary members, which is the highest distinction award of the club. The decision was made by the Real Madrid board of directors chaired by Florentino Pérez.

=== Dallas Mavericks (2018–2025) ===
==== 2018–19 season: Rookie of the Year ====
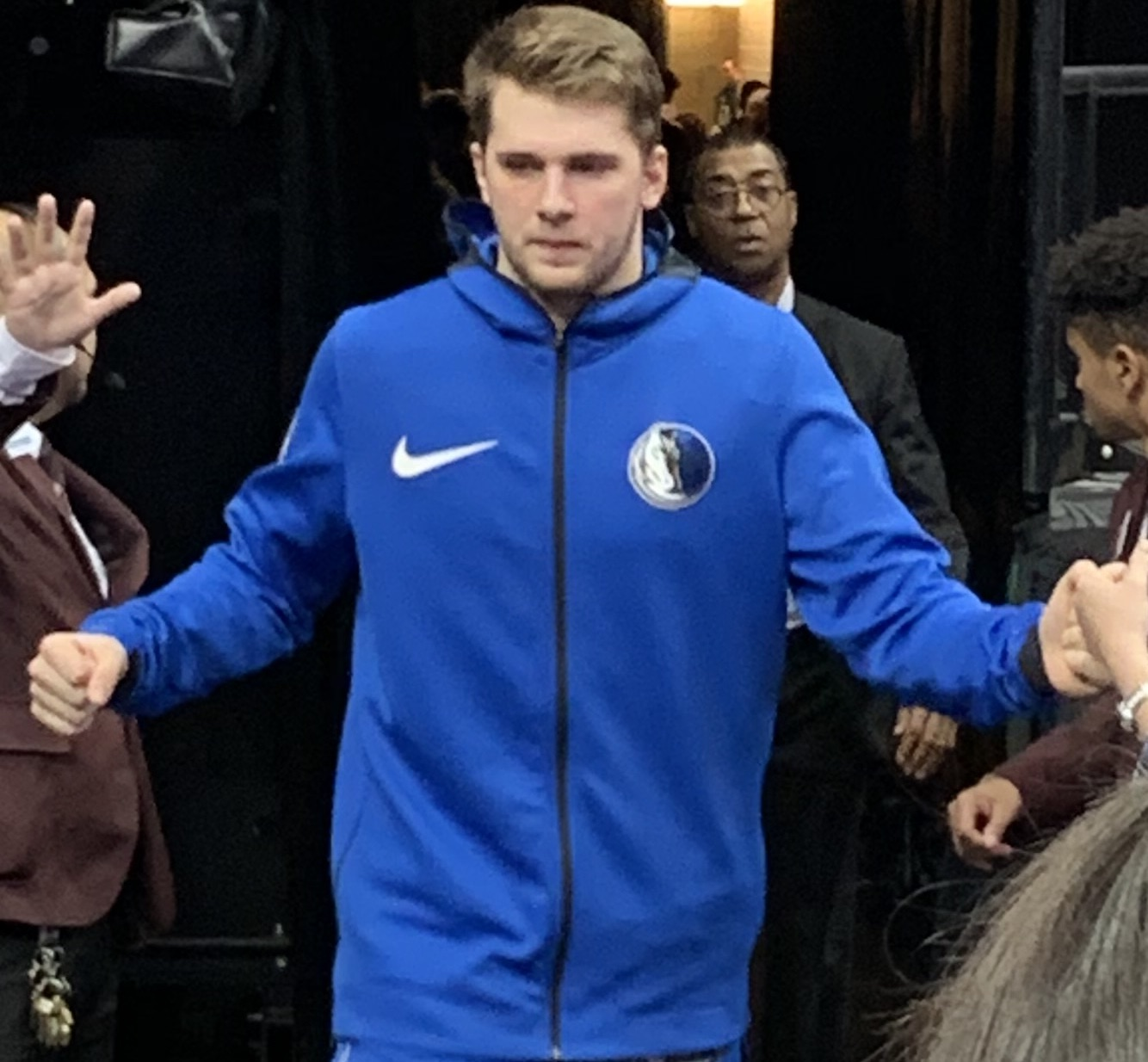
Dončić in 2018

On June 21, 2018, Dončić was selected with the third overall pick by the Atlanta Hawks in the 2018 NBA draft. He was then traded to the Dallas Mavericks in exchange for the draft rights to Trae Young and a protected future first-round pick in 2019. After the draft, Mavericks head coach Rick Carlisle said, "At one point, we thought there might be a slight chance Dončić could fall to us, but a couple of days ago it was pretty clear that there was no way that was going to happen. He's just too good. We get a guy we think is franchise foundation piece." Dončić signed his rookie contract with the Mavericks on July 9, 2018. He did not play at the 2018 NBA Summer League due to his late buyout from Real Madrid. Before the 2018–19 season, ESPN considered Dončić the favorite to win the NBA Rookie of the Year award.

Dončić made his regular-season debut on October 17, 2018, recording 10 points, eight rebounds and four assists in a 121–100 loss to the Phoenix Suns. On October 20, Dončić recorded 26 points and 6 rebounds in a 140–136 victory over the Minnesota Timberwolves. He became the youngest 20-point scorer in franchise history. On October 29, Dončić posted 31 points and eight rebounds in a 113–108 loss to the San Antonio Spurs for his first 30-point game in the NBA. Three weeks later, Dončić recorded his first NBA double-double, with 15 points and 10 rebounds in a 98–88 loss to the Memphis Grizzlies. He was named NBA Rookie of the Month in the Western Conference for November 2018. On December 8, Dončić scored 21 points in a 107–104 victory over the Houston Rockets. After initial struggles, he produced a personal 11–0 run in the game's final minutes. On December 28, Dončić scored 34 points and became the youngest NBA player to make seven three-pointers in a game. He was named Western Conference Rookie of the Month for December 2018. On January 21, Dončić recorded his first NBA triple-double with 18 points, 11 rebounds and 10 assists in a 116–106 loss to the Milwaukee Bucks. The performance made Dončić the third-youngest player in NBA history to accomplish the feat at 19 years and 327 days old, behind LaMelo Ball and Markelle Fultz. On January 27, Dončić scored a season-high 35 points and recorded his second NBA triple-double, adding 12 rebounds and 10 assists in a 123–120 loss to the Toronto Raptors. He became the first teenager in NBA history with a 30-point triple-double and multiple triple-doubles. Two days later, Dončić was named a confirmed participant for the World Team representing Slovenia in the 2019 Rising Stars Challenge. Despite being second in fan voting, behind only LeBron James, and ranked eighth in the total voting score, Dončić wasn't selected for the Western Conference All-Stars in the 2019 NBA All-Star Game.

On February 6, Dončić recorded his third triple-double with 19 points, 10 rebounds and 11 assists in a 99–93 victory over the Charlotte Hornets, which made Dončić the youngest player in NBA history to record three triple-doubles. He edged Hall of Famer Magic Johnson by 117 days. On February 25, Dončić recorded his fourth triple-double with 28 points, 10 rebounds and 10 assists in a 121–112 loss to the Los Angeles Clippers. Dončić was named Western Conference Rookie of the Month for January 2019. His eight triple-doubles ranked fourth on the season behind Russell Westbrook (34), Nikola Jokić (12) and Ben Simmons (10), as well as tied with LeBron James. Dončić became just the fifth player in NBA history to average at least 20 points, 5 rebounds and 5 assists in his rookie year, joining Oscar Robertson (1960–61), Michael Jordan (1984–85), LeBron James (2003–04) and Tyreke Evans (2009–10). In May, Dončić was selected unanimously to the All-Rookie First Team. In June, he received the NBA Rookie of the Year award. Dončić became the second European player, after Pau Gasol, to win the award and the sixth overall winner not born in the United States.

==== 2019–20 season: First All-Star and playoff appearance ====
Dončić made his first triple-double of the season on October 25, 2019, posting 25 points, 10 rebounds and 10 assists to help the Mavericks defeat the New Orleans Pelicans 123–116. In two consecutive games, on November 1 and 3, he recorded two triple-doubles and matched a career-high 15 assists in both games. On November 8, Dončić scored a career-high 38 points and recorded his twelfth NBA triple-double by adding 14 rebounds and 10 assists in a 106–102 loss to the New York Knicks. Ten days later, in a 117–110 victory over the San Antonio Spurs, Dončić recorded a then-career-high 42 points and his sixth triple-double of the season by adding 11 rebounds and 12 assists. He made NBA history in a 142–94 victory over the Golden State Warriors on November 20, posting 35 points, 10 rebounds and 11 assists. Dončić became the youngest player to have 35-point triple-doubles in succession, breaking Oscar Robertson's record. Dončić was the fourth player to do so since the 1983–84 season, joining Michael Jordan, James Harden and Russell Westbrook. In November, Dončić was named the NBA Western Conference Player of the Week for Week 5 (November 18–24), his first NBA Player of the Week award. On December 3, he won his first NBA Player of the Month award when he was named the NBA Western Conference Player of the Month for October and November. Dončić became the youngest Western Conference Player of the Month winner since the league began issuing the award by conferences in the 2001–02 season. In December, he was named Sports Illustrated 2019 Breakout of the Year. On December 8, 2019, Dončić surpassed the record for the most consecutive games with at least 20 points, five rebounds and five assists since the ABA-NBA merger in 1976. Michael Jordan previously held the record with 18 straight games in 1989. Dončić recorded his tenth triple-double of the season on January 4, 2020, posting 39 points, 12 rebounds and 10 assists in a 123–120 loss to the Charlotte Hornets.

During the 2019–20 season, Dončić was selected to his first NBA All-Star Game as a Western Conference starter. Dončić became the youngest European player to start in an All-Star game. On March 4, he recorded his 22nd career triple-double, passing Jason Kidd for the most in Mavericks history. Dončić registered 30 points, 17 rebounds and 10 assists in a 127–123 overtime victory over the New Orleans Pelicans. He recorded his 15th triple-double of the season on July 31, 2020, posting 28 points, 13 rebounds and 10 assists in a 153–149 overtime loss to the Houston Rockets. On August 4, Dončić recorded another triple-double with 34 points, 12 assists and a career-high 20 rebounds in a 114–110 overtime win over the Sacramento Kings. With that, he became the youngest player to record 30-plus points, 20-plus rebounds and 10 or more assists. On August 8, Dončić had a then-career-high 19 assists, which tied LeBron James for an NBA season high, 36 points, 14 rebounds and two turnovers in a 136–132 win against the Milwaukee Bucks. The game marked Dončić's 17th triple-double of the season and clinched his spot as the youngest player to lead the NBA in triple-doubles. On August 15, he was selected to the NBA's All-Seeding Games First Team for his play in the eight seeding games, where he averaged 30.0 points, 10.1 rebounds and 9.7 assists per game. Dončić finished as one of the three finalists for the NBA Most Improved Player award. He finished third behind eventual winner Brandon Ingram and second place Bam Adebayo. On August 17, Dončić made his NBA playoffs debut, scoring 42 points (most ever in an NBA playoffs debut) in a 118–110 loss to the Los Angeles Clippers. On August 23, he became the youngest player in NBA postseason history with a 40-point triple-double, scoring 43 points, including a game-winning, buzzer-beating three-pointer, in a 135–133 overtime victory over the Los Angeles Clippers. With that performance, Dončić became just the second player in NBA history to record at least 43 points, 17 rebounds and 13 assists in any game, joining Wilt Chamberlain as the other. On September 16, Dončić was named to the All-NBA First Team. He became the first player since Tim Duncan in the 1998–99 season to be selected to an All-NBA First Team in a first or second season. Dončić finished fourth overall in the season's final MVP results. He also became the second-youngest player ever to finish in the top five of MVP voting.

==== 2020–21 season: First division title and second All-NBA First Team ====
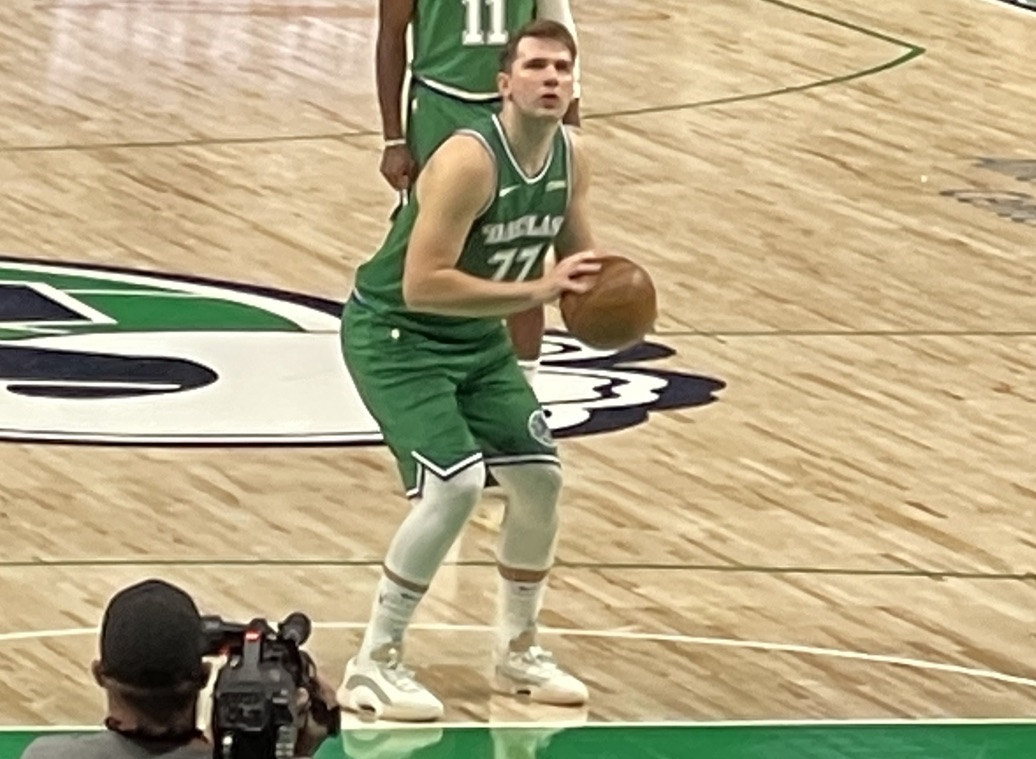
Dončić shooting a free throw in 2021

On February 6, 2021, Dončić matched his then-career-high 42 points while putting up 11 assists and seven rebounds in a 134–132 win over the Golden State Warriors. On February 12, Dončić logged a career-high 46 points with 12 assists, eight rebounds, a block and a steal in a 143–130 win over the New Orleans Pelicans. On May 1, he recorded 31 points, 12 rebounds and a career-high 20 assists in a 125–124 victory over the Washington Wizards. With that performance, Dončić became just the fourth player in NBA history to record a 30-point triple-double with at least 20 assists, joining Oscar Robertson, Magic Johnson and Russell Westbrook. On May 7, Dončić reached 5,000 points for his career. At the age of 22 years and 68 days, he became the fourth-youngest player to achieve the feat, trailing only LeBron James, Kevin Durant and Carmelo Anthony. On May 22, he recorded 31 points, 10 rebounds and 11 assists in a 113–103 victory over the Los Angeles Clippers in Game 1 of the 2021 NBA Playoffs. Dončić became the first player in NBA history to have three triple-doubles in their first seven career postseason games. He also passed Kareem Abdul-Jabbar as the youngest player in NBA history to record a playoff triple-double on the road. On May 28, Dončić scored a then playoff career-high 44 points in a 118–108 loss in Game 3 of the Western Conference first round to the Los Angeles Clippers. On June 6, in his first Game 7, Dončić surpassed his playoff career high with 46 points and 14 assists. The Mavericks fell short 126–111 and were eliminated in the first round for the second consecutive season, despite leading the series 2–0. On June 15, Dončić was selected to his second consecutive All-NBA First Team. Like the previous year, Dončić became the first player since Tim Duncan to be selected twice to the All-NBA First Team in their first three seasons and just the sixth to do so since the ABA–NBA merger, joining David Thompson, Larry Bird, David Robinson and Anfernee Hardaway.

==== 2021–22 season: First Western Conference Finals appearance ====
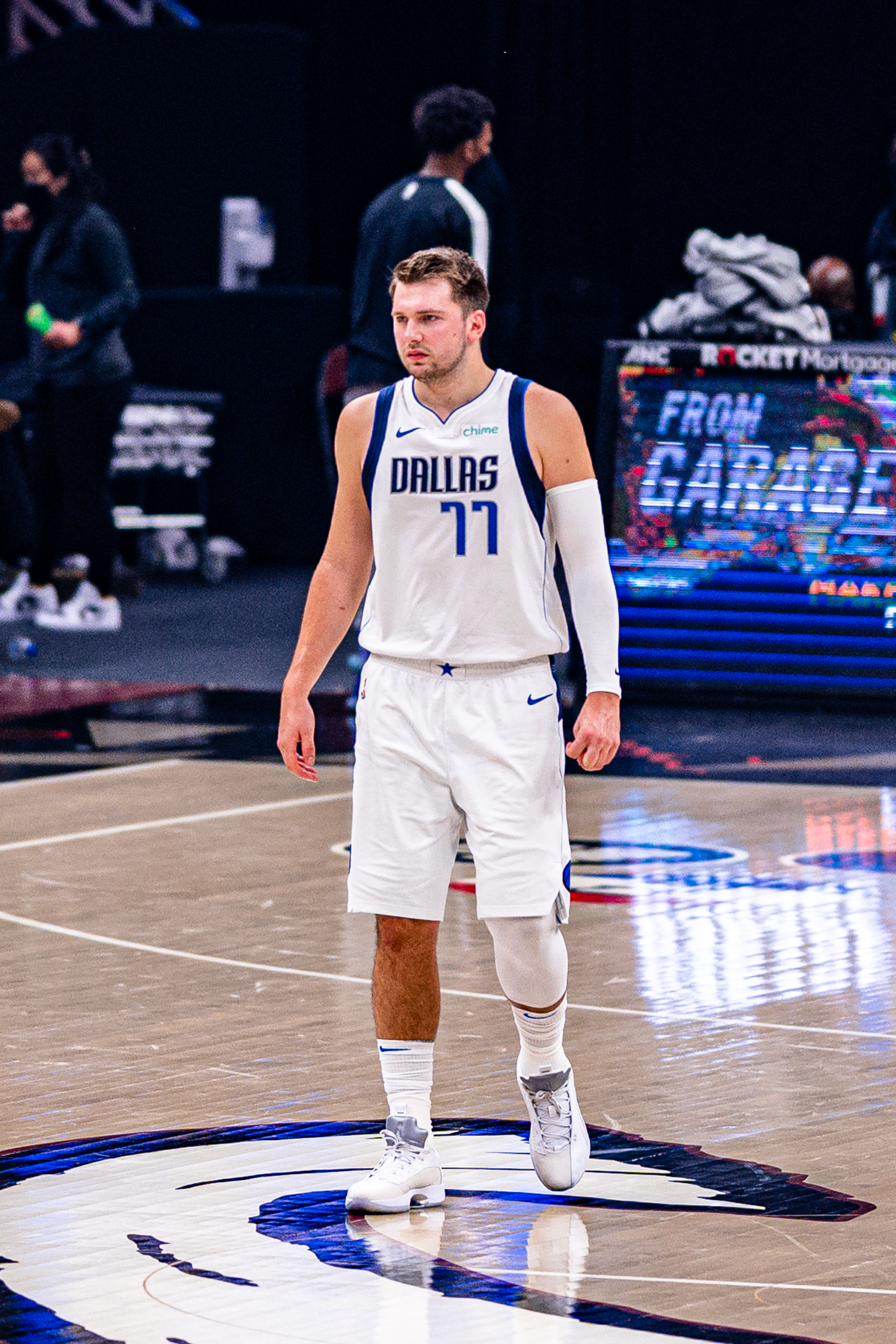
Dončić in 2021

On August 10, 2021, Dončić signed a five-year $207 million rookie extension, the largest in NBA history. On February 3, 2022, Dončić was named as a reserve for the 2022 NBA All-Star Game. Two days later, Dončić logged his 44th career triple-double with 33 points, 13 rebounds, 15 assists and two steals in a 107–98 victory over the Philadelphia 76ers, overtaking Fat Lever for tenth on the all-time career triple-double list. On February 10, Dončić scored 28 of his career-high 51 points in the first quarter, grabbed nine rebounds, and dished out six assists on 17-of-26 shooting from the field, including seven three-pointers, in a 112–105 victory over the Los Angeles Clippers. Three days later against the Clippers, Dončić scored 23 of his 45 points in the fourth quarter, grabbed 15 rebounds, and dished out eight assists in a 99–97 loss. With 96 points in the two games, Dončić had the most in a two-game span against the same opponent since Wilt Chamberlain scored 100 for Philadelphia against Seattle in December 1967. For his performances against the Clippers, Dončić was named Western Conference Player of the Week. On February 18, he scored 49 points, including seven three-pointers, to go along with 15 rebounds and 8 assists in a 125–118 victory over the New Orleans Pelicans. Dončić became the fourth player in NBA history to record multiple 45-point, 15-rebound and five-assist games in a calendar month, as well as the first player to record at least 40 points, fifteen rebounds, five assists, five three-pointers and a plus/minus of +20 in the same game.

On February 27, Dončić recorded 34 points and 11 rebounds, leading the Mavericks back from 21 down in the third quarter against the Golden State Warriors in a 107–101 victory. Dončić became the first player in NBA history to average 30 points, 10 rebounds and eight assists per game while shooting at least 40 percent from three-point range in a calendar month in the three-point era since 1980. On March 3, Dončić won his second career NBA Player of the Month award when he was named the NBA Western Conference Player of the Month for February; Dončić is the second Maverick to win this award multiple times, after Dirk Nowitzki, who won it six times in his career. On March 29, Dončić logged his 46th career triple-double with 34 points (25 points in the first half), 12 rebounds and 12 assists in a 128–110 victory over the Los Angeles Lakers.

Dončić missed the first three games of the playoffs because of an injury in the final regular season game. On April 28, Dončić led the Mavericks to a 98–96 Game 6 win over the Utah Jazz to close the first-round series. It was the first time Dallas had advanced to the postseason's second round in Dončić's four-year NBA career. It was also the first time Mavericks won in the first round since winning the 2011 NBA Finals. On May 2, in Game 1 of the Western Conference semifinals, Dončić posted 45 points, 12 rebounds and eight assists in a 121–114 loss to the #1 seed Phoenix Suns. On May 15, Dončić recorded 35 points, 10 rebounds, four assists and two steals in three quarters of play in a 123–90 Game 7 victory, securing the Mavericks a place in the Western Conference Finals. On May 20, during Game 2 of the Western Conference Finals, Dončić posted 42 points, five rebounds, eight assists and three steals in a 126–117 loss to the Golden State Warriors. He joined Michael Jordan (917) and Wilt Chamberlain (867) as the only players in NBA history with 800 points through their first 25 career playoff games. Dončić also tied Dirk Nowitzki for the most 40-plus-point games in Mavericks playoff history with seven. Two days later, Dončić surpassed Nowitzki in 40-point playoff games with a double-double of 40 points (including 21 in the fourth quarter) and 11 rebounds in a 109–100 Game 3 loss. According to Elias Sports Bureau, he led Dallas in points, rebounds and assists ten times during the playoffs—the most ever in a single postseason. On May 24, Dončić was selected to his third All-NBA First Team, becoming the third player since the merger to do so in their first four years, joining Tim Duncan and Larry Bird.

==== 2022–23 season: Record-setting performances and playoff miss ====
On October 22, 2022, Dončić recorded 32 points, seven rebounds and 10 assists in a 137–96 victory over the Memphis Grizzlies. In the game, he became the fourth player since the merger to record 7,000 career points in less than 270 games, joining Michael Jordan, Shaquille O'Neal and LeBron James. On October 27, Dončić recorded a triple-double with 41 points, 11 rebounds and 14 assists in a 129–125 overtime victory over the Brooklyn Nets. The game marked his 22nd career 30-point triple-double, passing Wilt Chamberlain for fifth most in NBA history. On October 30, Dončić scored a game-high 44 points in a 114–105 victory over the Orlando Magic, becoming the first player in NBA history to record 200-plus points, 50-plus rebounds and 50-plus assists through the first six games of a season. He also became the sixth player in NBA history to score at least 30 points in each of the first six games of a season and the first to do so since Michael Jordan in the 1986–87 season. On November 2, in a 103–100 victory against the Utah Jazz, Dončić scored 33 points and became the first player since Wilt Chamberlain in 1962–63 to score at least 30 points in each of the first seven games of a season. In the next game, Dončić recorded 35 points, eight rebounds, six assists and three steals in a 111–110 victory over the Toronto Raptors. He became the only other NBA player to score 30 or more points in the first eight games of a season beside Wilt Chamberlain, who did it in the first eight of the 1959–60 season and the first 23 of the 1962–63 season.

On November 18, Dončić recorded his 50th career triple-double with 33 points, 12 rebounds and 11 assists in a 127–99 victory over the Denver Nuggets. In doing so, Dončić became the second-fastest player to record 50 triple-doubles, needing 278 career games, only trailing Oscar Robertson (111) and one fewer game than Magic Johnson (279). On November 23, Dončić scored a game-high 42 points along with eight rebounds and nine assists in a 125–112 loss to the Boston Celtics. He became the second-fastest player in NBA history (in terms of games played) to reach 7,500-plus points, 2,000-plus rebounds and 2,000-plus assists, trailing only Oscar Robertson, who accomplished the feat in 254 games compared to the Dončić's 280 outings. On November 29, Dončić recorded his 51st career triple-double with 41 points, 12 rebounds and 12 assists in a 116–113 victory over the reigning champion Golden State Warriors. It was the fifth 40-point triple-double of his career, ranking behind only Oscar Robertson (22), James Harden (16), Russell Westbrook (13), Wilt Chamberlain (7) and LeBron James (6) in NBA history. Dončić also tied Dirk Nowitzki for the second-most 40-point outings in Mavericks history (20), trailing only Mark Aguirre (22).

On December 23, Dončić put up 50 points, eight rebounds and 10 assists in a 112–106 victory over the Houston Rockets. He joined Dirk Nowitzki as the only player to record multiple 50-point games in Mavericks history. On December 27, Dončić set a career high in points (60) and rebounds (21) and became the first player in NBA history to record a 60-point, 20-rebound triple-double in a 126–121 victory over the New York Knicks and the first player since James Harden to record a 60-point triple-double, the second in NBA history. Dončić also became just the third player in NBA history to record a 50-point, 20-rebound triple-double, joining Elgin Baylor and Chamberlain. Dončić's 60 points were also the most scored in Mavericks history, previously held by Nowitzki (53), and surpassed Nowitzki for the most 50-point games in Mavericks history. On December 31, Dončić recorded 51 points, six rebounds, nine assists and four steals in a 126–125 win over the San Antonio Spurs. He became the first player in NBA history to record 250-plus points, 50-plus rebounds and 50-plus assists over a five-game span. Dončić also surpassed Mark Aguirre for the most 40-point games in Mavericks history with 23.

On January 3, 2023, Dončić was awarded the Western Conference Player of the Month award for his play during the month of December, the third of his career. On January 12, Dončić recorded his 10th triple-double of the season with 35 points, 14 rebounds and 13 assists playing a career-high 53 minutes in a 119–115 double overtime victory over the Los Angeles Lakers. Dončić hit tying three-pointers in the final seconds of regulation and the first overtime. On January 26, he was named a Western Conference starter for the 2023 NBA All-Star Game, marking his fourth consecutive selection. On January 30, Dončić scored 53 points on 17-of-24 shooting from the field in a 111–105 victory over the Detroit Pistons, marking his fifth career 50-point game. Dončić tied LeBron James for the second-most 50-point games in a player's first five seasons in the NBA with five, trailing Michael Jordan's record of 17 since the ABA–NBA merger. On March 2, Dončić had 42 points and 12 assists in a 133–126 victory over the Philadelphia 76ers. In the same game, his teammate Kyrie Irving scored 40 points and it was the first time in franchise history that two players scored 40 points in the same game. On March 22, Dončić recorded 30 points, seven rebounds and a season-high 17 assists in a 127–125 loss to the Golden State Warriors. It was his 41st 30-point game of the season, surpassing Mark Aguirre's previous record for the most 30-point games in a season in Mavericks history. On May 10, Dončić was selected to his fourth consecutive All-NBA First Team.

==== 2023–24 season: First scoring title and finals appearance ====
On October 25, 2023, Dončić put up a triple-double with 33 points, 14 rebounds and 10 assists in a 126–119 win over the San Antonio Spurs. He also became the first player in Mavericks history to put up a 30-point triple-double in a season-opening game. Two days later, Dončić scored 49 points, including a career-high nine three-pointers, to go along with 10 rebounds and seven assists in a 125–120 victory over the Brooklyn Nets. On November 10, Dončić scored 44 points on 17-of-21 shooting from the field in a 144–126 victory over the Los Angeles Clippers. On December 2, he recorded his 59th career regular-season triple-double with 36 points, 15 rebounds and 18 assists in a 126–120 loss against the Oklahoma City Thunder, tying Larry Bird for ninth on the all-time career triple-double list. Four days later, Dončić recorded the 60th triple-double of his career with 40 points, 10 rebounds and 11 assists in a 147–97 victory over the Utah Jazz. During the first half, Dončić scored 29 points, 10 rebounds and 10 assists, marking the first 25-point triple-double in NBA history entering halftime. This mark also broke a tie with Bird for ninth place on the all-time career triple-doubles list. On December 11, Dončić put up 35 points in a 120–113 victory over the Memphis Grizzlies. He became the second-fastest player in NBA history to achieve 1,000 made career three-pointers, trailing Buddy Hield and doing so in 351 games. Dončić also became the youngest player in NBA history to achieve 1,000 career three-pointers, doing so at 24 years and 287 days old. On December 16, Dončić had a triple-double with 40 points, 12 rebounds and 10 assists in a 131–120 victory over Portland Trail Blazers. He passed Wilt Chamberlain for fourth on the all-time 40-point triple-doubles list. Chamberlain had seven career games where he posted a 40-point triple-double, and now Dončić has eight such games. On December 25, Dončić put up 50 points, 15 assists, six rebounds and four steals in a 128–114 victory over the Phoenix Suns. He reached 10,000 career points in the same game. Dončić became the sixth player to reach 10,000 career regular-season points before turning 25, joining LeBron James, Kevin Durant, Kobe Bryant, Carmelo Anthony and Tracy McGrady. Dončić tied Bob McAdoo for reaching 10,000 points in the seventh-fewest games in NBA history. He is the quickest player to reach 10,000 points among active players as of 2023 with 358 games. This is the fastest since Michael Jordan. Dončić is also tied for the third-most points for Christmas Day games, behind Bernard King and Wilt Chamberlain.

On January 25, 2024, Dončić was named a Western Conference starter for the 2024 NBA All-Star Game, marking his fifth consecutive selection and his fourth selection as a starter. The next day, Dončić became the fourth player in league history to put up 72 or more points in a game and became the first player ever to score at least 70 points while shooting 75% or better from the field in a 148–143 victory over the Atlanta Hawks, finishing with a career-high 73 points (shooting 25-of-33 overall, with eight three-pointers made), setting a new franchise record, and with it being the most efficient 70-plus-point game in history. This marked the most points scored in a single game by any player since Kobe Bryant scored 81 points on January 22, 2006. Dončić's 33 field goal attempts were fewest field goal attempts needed to reach 70 points. His 41 points in the first half also set a Mavericks franchise record for the most points in any half, surpassing the previous record set by Dirk Nowitzki in December 2009. On January 27, Dončić recorded a triple-double with 28 points, 17 assists and 10 rebounds to become the first player in NBA history to average a 50-point triple-double over a two-game span. Two days later in a 131–129 victory over the Orlando Magic, Dončić became the seventh youngest player to record 3,000 assists, and joined LeBron James as the only two players in NBA history to reach 10,000 points, 3,000 rebounds and 3,000 assists before turning 25 years old.

On March 4, Dončić was awarded the Western Conference Player of the Month award for his play during the month of February, the fourth of his career. On March 9, Dončić recorded 39 points, 10 rebounds and 10 assists in a 142–124 victory over the Detroit Pistons. He became the first player to record six consecutive 30-point triple-doubles in NBA history. On April 2, Dončić was awarded the Western Conference Player of the Month award for his play during the month of March, the fifth of his career. It marked the second time in Dončić's career that he averaged a 30-point triple-double during any calendar month. The only other players in NBA history to average a 30-point triple-double in a month are Oscar Robertson (5 times) and Russell Westbrook (twice). Dončić also became the first player in franchise history to earn the monthly award in consecutive months and joined Dirk Nowitzki as the only Mavericks to receive the honor twice in the same season. On April 9, Dončić put up a triple-double with 39 points, 12 rebounds and 10 assists in a 130–104 win over the Charlotte Hornets, tying James Harden for eighth on the all-time career triple-double list. Dončić also surpassed Mark Aguirre's previous record of 2,330 points, for the most points scored in a season by a player in franchise history. Dončić finished the regular season as the first European to lead the NBA in scoring and the second international player to achieve the feat. Dončić finished the season's MVP race in third place. He was selected to his fifth All-NBA First Team, joining Kevin Durant and Tim Duncan as the only players with five All-NBA First Team selections before their 26th birthday, and also joined Larry Bird, George Gervin and Duncan as the only players to earn five-or-more All-NBA First Team selections within their first six seasons since the ABA–NBA merger. Dončić finished third in MVP voting behind Nikola Jokić and Shai Gilgeous-Alexander.

On May 15, 2024, in Game 5 of the Western Conference Semifinals against the Oklahoma City Thunder, Dončić delivered his sixth career playoff triple-double of 31 points, 10 rebounds and 11 assists in a 104–92 victory. In Game 6, Dončić logged his fourth triple-double of the 2024 playoffs with 29 points, 10 rebounds and 10 assists in a 117–116 victory, thus sending the Mavericks to the Western Conference Finals. In Game 2 of the Western Conference Finals against the Minnesota Timberwolves on May 24, Dončić recorded a triple-double of 32 points, 10 rebounds, 13 assists and a game-winning three-pointer with three seconds remaining in the fourth quarter, in a 109–108 victory. In Game 5, Dončić put up 36 points and 10 rebounds to lead the Mavericks to defeat the Timberwolves, 124–103, and secure the Mavericks' third NBA Finals appearance in franchise history. He would also win the Western Conference finals MVP. Dončić became the sixth player in NBA history after Tim Duncan, Jason Kidd, LeBron James, Nikola Jokić and Jayson Tatum to lead their team in points, rebounds and assists while reaching the NBA Finals.

In Game 1 of the 2024 NBA Finals against the Boston Celtics, Dončić scored 30 points and grabbed 10 rebounds in a 107–89 loss. He became just the first player since Tim Duncan in 1999 to record a 30-point double-double in his first Finals game. In Game 2, Dončić became the first player in Dallas franchise history to record a triple-double in a Finals game. He finished with 32 points, 11 rebounds, 11 assists and four steals in a 105–98 loss. It was his 10th career playoff triple-double. In Game 3, he fouled out in the game with over four minutes remaining in the game. Dallas would go on to lose the Finals to Boston in five games despite Dončić's 28-point, 12-rebound, 5-assist and 3-steal outing in the 106–88 close-out loss in Game 5. He also finished the postseason as the leader in total points (635), rebounds (208) and assists (178), becoming the second player in NBA history to finish as the playoff leader in all three of those categories since Nikola Jokić pulled off the feat in the 2023 NBA playoffs.

==== 2024–25 season: Final games with the Mavericks ====
On December 7, 2024, Dončić put up a triple-double with 30 points, 13 rebounds and 11 assists in a 125–118 win over the Toronto Raptors. He also surpassed Wilt Chamberlain and James Harden for seventh on the all-time career triple-double list. On December 16, Dončić posted his 80th career triple-double with a season-high 45 points (28 points in the first half), along with 11 rebounds and 13 assists in a 145–133 win over the Golden State Warriors. In a loss against Minnesota on December 25, he left the game with a strained calf, which was expected to sideline him for at least a month.

=== Los Angeles Lakers (2025–present) ===
==== 2024–25 season: Unexpected midseason trade ====
On February 2, 2025, Dončić was traded, alongside Maxi Kleber and Markieff Morris, to the Los Angeles Lakers in exchange for Max Christie, Anthony Davis and a 2029 first-round pick. The Lakers also traded Jalen Hood-Schifino and a 2025 second-round pick to the Utah Jazz, who also acquired a 2025 second-round pick from the Mavericks. The trade was regarded as one of the most significant and unexpected in NBA history, marking the first time two reigning All-NBA players were traded for each other midseason. The trade also put Dončić with his childhood idol, LeBron James. The Mavericks, who initiated the deal, drew heavy criticism for trading their franchise player, while Mavericks general manager Nico Harrison defended the trade, stating, "I believe that defense wins championships". Dončić on the other hand was blindsided by the trade; he was not told of it until the deal was done, according to Harrison.

At the time of the trade, Dončić had not played since Christmas Day as he had been sidelined with a calf strain. He recovered from his injury and made his Laker debut on February 10 against the Utah Jazz, scoring 14 points in 24 minutes as the Lakers won 132–113. On February 25, Dončić put up his first triple-double as a Laker with 19 points, 15 rebounds and 12 assists in a 107–99 win over his former team, the Dallas Mavericks. On March 4, Dončić recorded 30 points and 15 assists in a 136–115 win over the New Orleans Pelicans. He became only the fourth player in Lakers history to post those totals in a single game after LeBron James, Magic Johnson and Jerry West. Dončić made his emotional return to Dallas on April 9, where he was honored with a pregame video tribute and was met with cheers from the crowd throughout the game. He matched his season high with 45 points in a 112–97 win over the Mavericks, joining Wilt Chamberlain as the second player in NBA history to score at least 45 points both for and against the same team in the same season.

Dončić made his playoff debut as a Laker on April 19, in Game 1 of the first round against the Minnesota Timberwolves, scoring 37 points, along with eight rebounds, in a losing effort. Dončić would then record 31 points, 12 rebounds and 9 assists in a 94–85 Game 2 win, the lone Los Angeles victory. Following a 38-point outing in a Game 4 loss on April 27, his 28-point, 7-rebound, 9-assist performance in Game 5 three days later, despite suffering a lower back injury in the second quarter and proceeding to play through the ailment, was not enough as the Lakers fell 103–96 and Minnesota closed out the series 4–1, eliminating the Lakers.

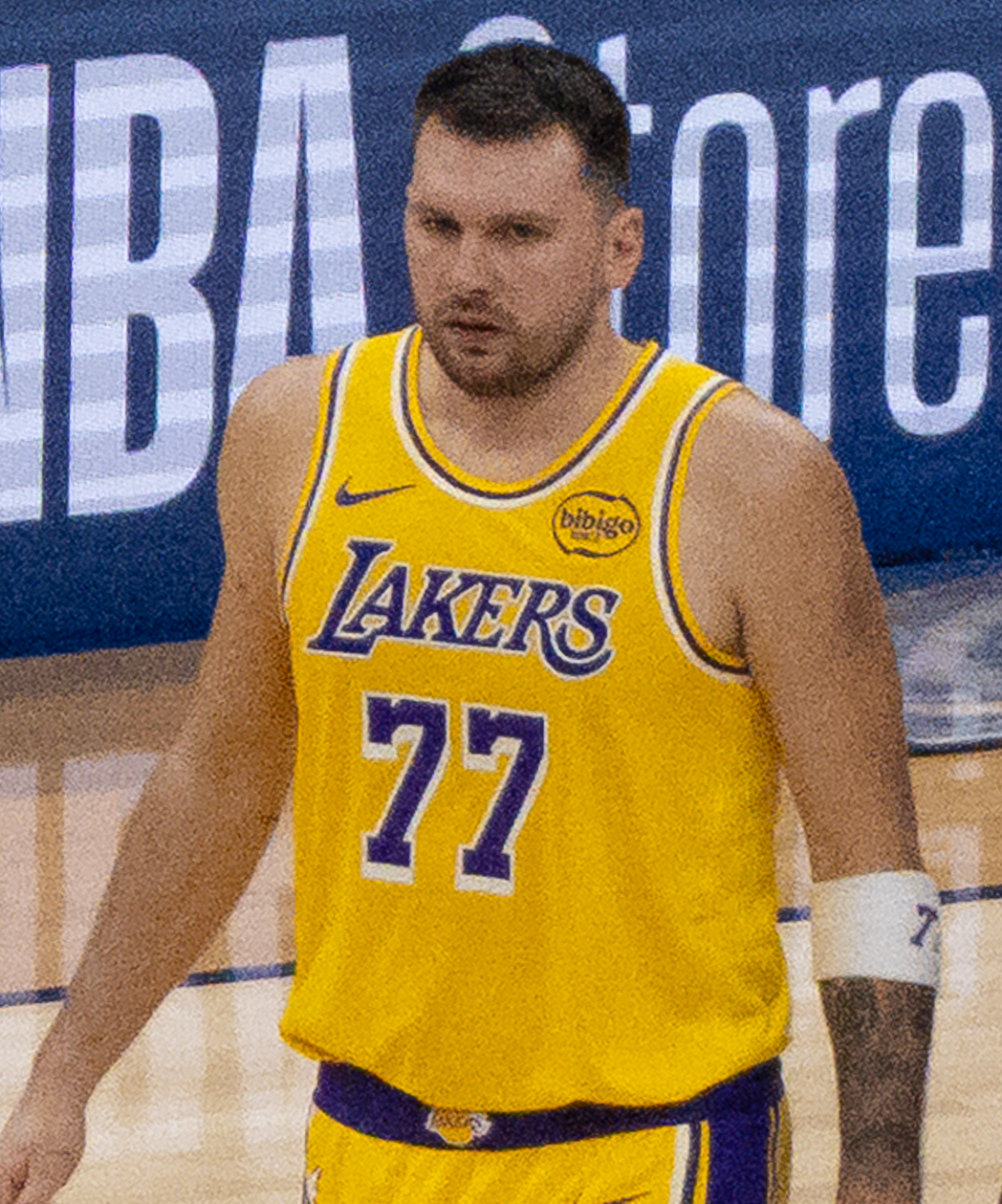
Dončić with the Los Angeles Lakers in 2026

==== 2025–26 season: Second scoring title ====
On August 2, 2025, Dončić and the Lakers agreed to a three-year, $165 million contract extension. On October 21, in his first game of the 2025–26 season, Dončić logged a near triple-double with 43 points, 12 rebounds and nine assists in a 119–109 loss to the Golden State Warriors. Three days later, he recorded 49 points, 11 rebounds, and eight assists in a 128–110 win over the Minnesota Timberwolves. He became the first Lakers player to record consecutive 40-point games to start a season. With 92 points, Dončić also set a new record for the most consecutive point totals in a season's first two games, surpassing Jerry West (81 points). On October 31, Dončić posted 44 points, 12 rebounds and six assists for the Lakers in a 117–112 win over the Memphis Grizzlies. With that performance, he became the second player in NBA history to start a season with three consecutive games of at least 40 points, joining Wilt Chamberlain. On December 18, Dončić put up his 85th career triple-double with 45 points, 11 rebounds and 14 assists, alongside five steals in a 143–135 win over the Utah Jazz. He also joined Magic Johnson, Elgin Baylor and Jerry West as the only players to put up a 40-point triple-double in Lakers franchise history.

On January 20, 2026, Dončić recorded his 87th career triple-double with 38 points, 13 rebounds and 10 assists in a 115–107 win over the Denver Nuggets. On January 26, Dončić put up 46 points, seven rebounds, and 11 assists in a 129–118 win over the Chicago Bulls. He joined Elgin Baylor as the only players to have multiple games with at least 45 points and at least 10 assists in Lakers franchise history. On March 12, Dončić scored a then season-high 51 points, adding 10 rebounds and nine assists to lead the Lakers to a 142–130 win over the Bulls. On March 19, Dončić scored a season-high 60 points, while adding seven rebounds, three assists, five steals, and nine three-pointers in a 134–126 win over the Miami Heat. He became the first player to score 60 points with the Lakers since Kobe Bryant's final game in 2016. Dončić also became the first player in NBA history to record at least 60 points, at least five steals, and at least nine three-pointers in a game. On March 25, Dončić posted 43 points, six rebounds, and seven assists in a 137–130 win over the Indiana Pacers. He recorded his 11th consecutive 30-point game, joining Kobe Bryant, Shaquille O'Neal, Jerry West, and Elgin Baylor as the only players in franchise history to achieve the feat. During this eleven-game span, he totaled 435 points, 89 rebounds, and 80 assists, becoming only the second player after James Harden to reach those figures over such a stretch. Over the course of the Lakers' road trip, Dončić averaged 40.7 points per game, becoming the first player since Michael Jordan in 1986 to average at least 40 points over six consecutive road games. On March 31, Dončić put up 42 points and 12 assists in a 127–113 win over the Cleveland Cavaliers. He became the third-youngest player to reach 15,000 career points, trailing only LeBron James and Kevin Durant.

On April 2, Dončić suffered a Grade 2 hamstring strain in a 139–96 loss to the Oklahoma City Thunder, ruling him out for the remainder of the regular season. Dončić revealed that he was given an initial eight-week recovery timeline and he had traveled to Europe to receive specialized medical treatment. Dončić did not recover in time as the Lakers' postseason run ended on May 11 after they were swept in the West semifinals by the Thunder. On May 24, Dončić was named to the All-NBA First Team, marking his sixth career selection by age 27, a feat achieved by only four other players in NBA history: Tim Duncan (seven), LeBron James (six), Oscar Robertson (six), and Bob Pettit (six).

==== 2026–27 season: Franchise player ====
On July 24, 2026, LeBron James departed for the Philadelphia 76ers, leaving Dončić as the Lakers' undisputed leader. On October 25, Dončić put up a then season-high 52 points along with 10 assists in a 132–123 victory over the Utah Jazz. On November 1, Dončić scored 45 points that included eight-made three-pointers while adding 15 rebounds, six assists, and five steals in a 131–125 victory over the Toronto Raptors. He became the first player in NBA history to record at least four steals and four three-pointers in the first quarter of a game, while also becoming the first point guard to record at least five steals and five three-pointers in a half. On November 6, in a 124–118 win over the Portland Trail Blazers, Dončić scored a season-high 53 points while adding five rebounds and five assists. He became the fourth player in Lakers franchise history (after George Mikan, Kobe Bryant, and Elgin Baylor) to score over 40 points in four consecutive games. On November 15, Dončić recorded 43 points and nine assists in the Lakers' 131–123 victory over the Phoenix Suns. He made five three-pointers and extended his streak to ten consecutive games with at least 30 points. The Lakers secured their eighth consecutive win, improving their record to 12–2. Dončić also reached 468 points through his first 12 games of the season, surpassing James Harden's previous mark of 464 points for the most points scored in the first 12 games of a season over the past 50 years.

== National team career ==
=== Junior national team ===
Dončić was set to play at the Division B tournament of the 2014 FIBA Europe Under-16 Championship but was forced to withdraw from the tournament with a knee injury. In December 2014, he participated in a friendly tournament in Székesfehérvár, Hungary, averaging 35.3 points and 7.6 rebounds per game while shooting 81 percent on two-pointers and 57 percent on three-pointers.

=== Senior national team ===
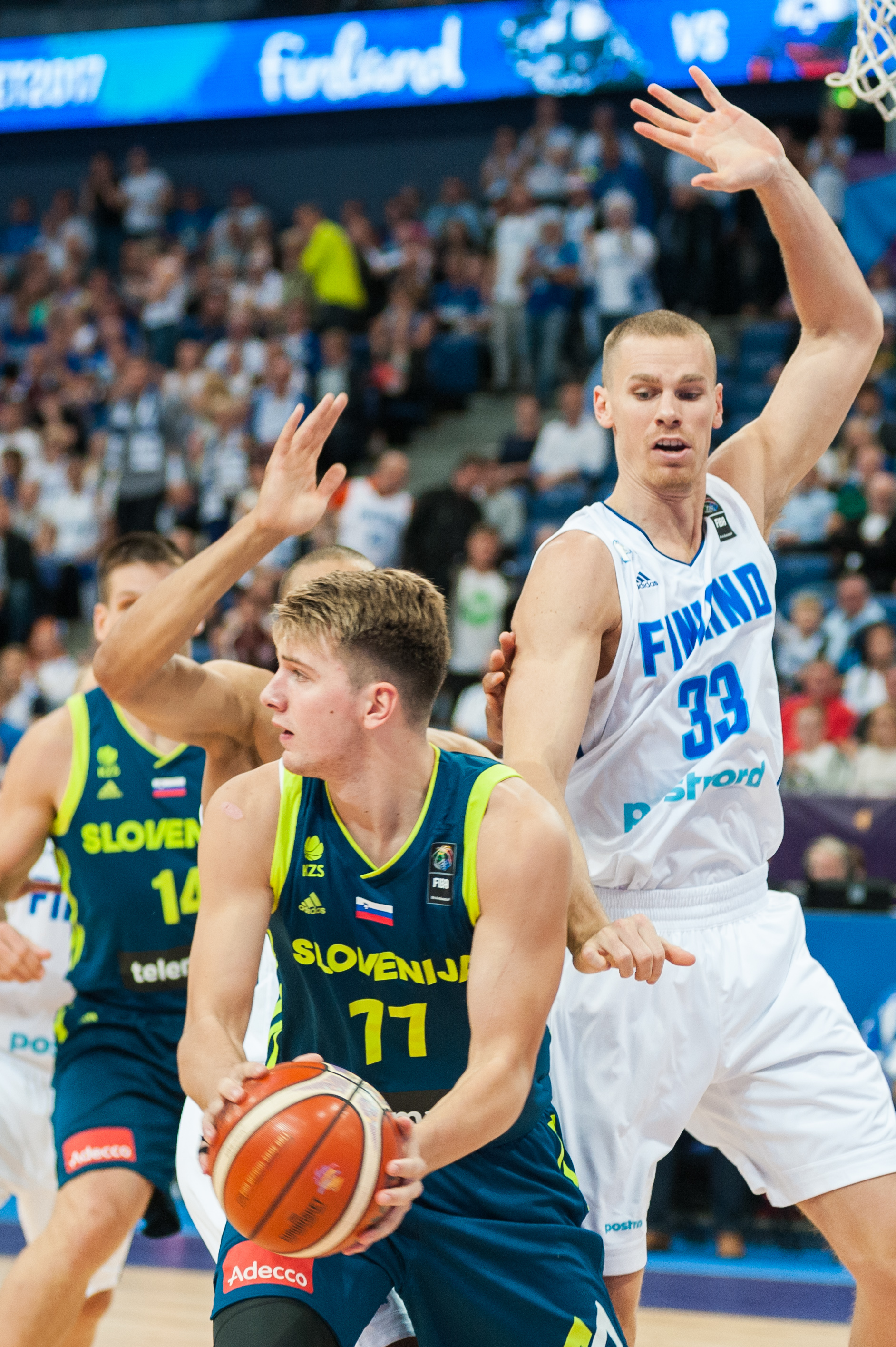
Dončić (front) during EuroBasket 2017

==== EuroBasket 2017 ====
On September 22, 2016, Dončić announced that he would represent the senior men's Slovenian national team for the rest of his career. Dončić was previously linked with several other national teams, including Serbia and Spain. His national team roommate became Goran Dragić, whom he met at age seven and has been cited as his mentor and friend.

Dončić was a Slovenian squad member for EuroBasket 2017, where his country won its first gold medal after going undefeated (9–0) in the tournament. In Slovenia's 103–97 victory over Latvia in the quarterfinals, he scored 27 points and grabbed nine rebounds. Dončić recorded 11 points, 12 rebounds and eight assists, in the 92–72 semifinal win over Spain. In the final, Slovenia won by a score of 93–85 over Serbia. He had eight points and seven rebounds, before falling out of the game, due to an injury, in the game's third quarter. Dončić was also named to the competition's All-Tournament Team, joining teammate Goran Dragić, who was voted the EuroBasket MVP.

==== 2020 Summer Olympics ====
During the 2020 FIBA Men's Olympic Qualifying Tournament in Kaunas, Lithuania, Dončić led Slovenia to its first-ever Olympic berth. He won MVP of the tournament by leading Slovenia to a 96–85 victory over Lithuania while recording 31 points, 11 rebounds and 13 assists in the final round.

In his Olympic debut on July 26, 2021, Dončić scored 48 points in a 118–100 victory over Argentina. His 48-point performance tied for the second-highest men's point total in a single game in Summer Olympics history and marked the most in a men's basketball debut. In the semifinal matchup versus France, Dončić posted the third triple-double in Olympic men's basketball history with 16 points, 10 rebounds and 18 assists in a 90–89 loss. It also ended his 17-match winning streak from the senior national team debut back in 2017. Slovenia ended up losing the bronze medal match versus Australia 107–93. For his play during the tournament, Dončić was selected to the FIBA All-Star Five team, joining Patty Mills, Ricky Rubio, Kevin Durant and Rudy Gobert as the five best players at the games.

==== EuroBasket 2022 ====
During the tournament's group stage, Dončić scored 47 points as he led Slovenia to the Round of 16 with an 88–82 victory over France, claiming the top spot in Group B. His 47-point performance was the second-highest scoring total in EuroBasket history. It was the most points scored by any player in EuroBasket history in the last 65 years. On September 10, Dončić scored 35 points while beating Belgium 88–72 to advance to the quarterfinals. The game marked his third consecutive game scoring 30-plus points, becoming the first player in tournament history in 30 years to do so. Slovenia was eventually upset by Poland 90–87 in the quarterfinals.

==== 2023 FIBA Basketball World Cup ====
During the 2023 FIBA Basketball World Cup Dončić joined the exclusive 200-point club. He became one of only 11 players to do so in a single World Cup campaign, as Dončić led all scorers with 27.0 points to go along with 7.1 rebounds, 6.1 assists and 2.5 steals per game. Slovenia finished the tournament at seventh place beating Italy 89–85 with Dončić leading both sides in points, rebounds and assists. In recognition of his individual play, Dončić was named to the World Cup All-Tournament Team.

==== 2024 Summer Olympics, qualification loss ====
In the qualifying rounds for the Paris 2024 Olympic Games, Dončić led Slovenia once again. On July 4, had a triple-double of 36 points, 11 rebounds and 10 assists in a 104–78 win over New Zealand. Slovenia, however, did not qualify for the Olympics, after losing to Greece 96–68, and therefore missing out on the final phase. He led the qualifying tournament in scoring with 27.7 points per game, was second in rebounds with 9.7 rebounds per game, and second in assists with an average of 8.3.

==== 2025 EuroBasket ====
Dončić captained Slovenia at EuroBasket 2025. In the opening game of the group phase, he had 34 points, 9 assists and 5 steals in a 95–105 loss to Poland, becoming the first player in EuroBasket history to record 30-plus points, 5-plus assists and 5-plus steals in a game. In the second game, Dončić's had a triple-double to lead his team to a 86–69 victory over Belgium, as he scored 26 points, grabbed 10 rebounds and delivered 11 assists. It was only the fourth triple-double at EuroBasket since 1995. With the game, he also became the youngest player (26 years and 184 days) to reach 400 EuroBasket points, surpassing Tony Parker's feat in 2007 (25 years, 122 days). On 4 September, he scored 37 points, grabbed 11 rebounds and had 9 assists in a 106–96 win over Iceland to finish the group phase. By doing so, he surpassed Goran Dragić as Slovenia's all-time leading scorer in international competitions, finishing the game with 1,100 total points. In the round of 16, Slovenia beat Italy 84–77 behind Dončić's 42 points. On 11 September, Dončić scored 39 points, grabbed 10 rebounds and gave 9 assists in the 91–99 quarterfinal loss to Germany, in which Slovenia was eliminated. He set a new all-time record for most points in a EuroBasket quarterfinal. Dončić was named to the All-Star Five of the tournament after leading all players in scoring with an average of 34.7 points per game, along with 8.6 rebounds and 7.1 assists.

== Player profile ==
"[Dončić is] incredible with the ball for a big guy. He's unbelievable in pick and roll play. His court vision is already unbelievable. I couldn't believe what I saw from a 19/20-year-old. He's a good shooter when he has time and I think he's going to be great for [the Dallas Mavericks] for a long, long time... I could shoot a little bit but I never had the court vision... the savviness that he brings to the game... He's going to pick defenses apart and it's going to be fun to watch."

— Mavericks all-time great and teammate Dirk Nowitzki on Dončić before the 2018–19 NBA season.

Dončić has frequently been described as a "position-less guard" with attributes of a point guard, shooting guard and small forward. Standing 6 feet 8 inches (2.03 m) and weighing 230 pounds (104.3 kg), he has been praised for his exceptional size and strength for the guard position. Dallas Mavericks executive Donnie Nelson lauded Dončić's "point forward ability" and sports website The Ringer labeled him a "legitimate point guard with the size of a small-ball power forward."

Since his early years with Real Madrid, Dončić was tabbed as one of Europe's premier talents, with Spanish newspaper Marca giving him the nickname "El Niño Maravilla" (The Wonder Boy). Entering the 2018 NBA draft, Dončić was widely seen as one of the best and most accomplished European prospects of his generation. Slam magazine considered Dončić the "best international prospect ever," and sports website SB Nation called him the "most accomplished NBA prospect in decades." An anonymous NBA veteran scouting executive said that Dončić's game was "leap years above anyone" in his draft class.

Dončić is versatile on the offensive end, displaying proficiency in shooting three-pointers, mid-range jump shots, floaters and shots in the post. His basketball IQ, intangibles and skills have been considered his primary assets, and Dončić is seen as an elite facilitator, especially on the pick and roll. NBA and EuroLeague coach Ettore Messina called Dončić "phenomenal, especially mentally" for his age. His lack of lateral quickness to stay in front of most NBA point guards and wings has been labeled one of his main flaws. Dallas Mavericks head coach Rick Carlisle refuted some of the worries regarding Dončić's athleticism, stating that "for a 19-year-old, he's got a really unusual combination of size, speed and deceptive quickness." By his second year, Dončić's ability to accelerate off a pick and blow by defenders to get to the basket was seen as one of his strengths. Given the false characterisation of Dončić's abilities and his subsequent success in the NBA, some speculate that prejudiced stereotyping had a role in his negative pre-draft evaluation.

Before his draft, basketball journalist and scout Austin Green compared Dončić to NBA players Paul Pierce and Joe Johnson. Dončić compared himself to Ben Simmons due to his versatility. In his second season, Los Angeles Clippers coach Doc Rivers, when asked about Dončić, stated that "there's a lot of people in him." He likened Dončić's stepback three-pointers to James Harden, his passing ability to Larry Bird, and his court vision to LeBron James. NBA analyst Kendrick Perkins called Dončić "baby LeBron" due to his overall skill and dominance on the court.

In December 2019, San Antonio Spurs coach Gregg Popovich called Dončić's playing style "Magic Johnson-like" because "he sees the floor in that same way." In August 2020, head coach Rick Carlisle compared Dončić's playmaking and court vision to Larry Bird and Jason Kidd. Milwaukee Bucks forward Giannis Antetokounmpo called Dončić "one of the most talented guys I've ever played against." During his first career playoff game against the Los Angeles Clippers, TV analyst and former point guard Mark Jackson, reiterated his view of Dončić, calling him "an absolute combination of Magic Johnson and Larry Bird."

In January 2024, former basketball player and Dallas Mavericks head coach Jason Kidd stated about Dončić that "he's better than Dirk [Nowitzki]" and that "he's in the atmosphere of [Michael Jordan], the best to ever do it, LeBron [James], Kobe [Bryant]".

== Awards and honors ==
NBA

- 6× NBA All-Star: 2020–2024, 2026
- 6× All-NBA First Team: 2020–2024, 2026
- NBA Cup All-Tournament Team: 2025
- NBA Rookie of the Year: 2019
- NBA All-Rookie First Team: 2019
- 2× NBA scoring champion: 2024, 2026
- NBA Western Conference finals MVP: 2024
- NBA Bubble All-Seeding Games First Team: 2020
- All-Time NBA European First Team

EuroLeague

- EuroLeague champion: 2018
- EuroLeague MVP: 2018
- EuroLeague Final Four MVP: 2018
- All-EuroLeague First Team: 2018
- 2× EuroLeague Rising Star: 2017, 2018
- EuroLeague MVP of the Month: October 2017
- Euroleague Basketball Next Generation Tournament champion: 2015
- Euroleague Basketball Next Generation Tournament MVP: 2015
- EuroLeague 2010–2020 All-Decade Team: 2020
- EuroLeague 25th Anniversary Team: 2025

Liga ACB

- 3× Liga ACB champion: 2015, 2016, 2018
- Liga ACB MVP: 2018
- All-Liga ACB First Team: 2018
- 2× ACB Best Young Player: 2017, 2018
- 3× ACB All-Young Players Team: 2016–2018
- 2× Spanish King's Cup winner: 2016, 2017
- ACB Player of the Month Award: December 2017

Slovenia Basketball

- Olympics All-Star Five: 2020
- FIBA Basketball World Cup Top Scorer: 2023
- FIBA Basketball World Cup All-Tournament Team: 2023
- EuroBasket gold medalist: 2017
- EuroBasket Top Scorer: 2025
- 2x EuroBasket All-Tournament Team: 2017, 2025
- Slovenian Sportsman of the Year: 2018

Other

- Best NBA Player ESPY Award: 2024
- Euroscar Player of the Year: 2019
- FIBA Intercontinental Cup champion: 2015

== Career statistics ==
Legend
GP	Games played	GS	Games started	MPG	Minutes per game
FG%	Field-goal percentage	3P%	3-point field-goal percentage	FT%	Free-throw percentage
RPG	Rebounds per game	APG	Assists per game	SPG	Steals per game
BPG	Blocks per game	PPG	Points per game	PIR	Performance index rating
**Bold**	Career high

=== NBA ===
*	Led the league

==== Regular season ====
Year	Team	GP	GS	MPG	FG%	3P%	FT%	RPG	APG	SPG	BPG	PPG
2018–19	Dallas	**72**	**72**	32.2	.427	.327	.713	7.8	6.0	1.1	.3	21.2
2019–20	Dallas	61	61	33.6	.463	.316	.758	**9.4**	8.8	1.0	.2	28.8
2020–21	Dallas	66	66	34.3	.479	.350	.730	8.0	8.6	1.0	.5	27.7
2021–22	Dallas	65	65	35.4	.457	.353	.744	9.1	8.7	1.2	**.6**	28.4
2022–23	Dallas	66	66	36.2	**.496**	.342	.742	8.6	8.0	1.4	.5	32.4
2023–24	Dallas	70	70	**37.5**	.487	**.382**	.786	9.2	**9.8**	1.4	.5	**33.9***
2024–25	Dallas	22	22	35.7	.464	.354	.767	8.3	7.8	**2.0**	.4	28.1
2024–25	L.A. Lakers	28	28	35.1	.438	.379	**.791**	8.1	7.5	1.6	.4	28.2
2025–26	L.A. Lakers	64	64	35.8	.476	.366	.780	7.7	8.3	1.6	.5	33.5*
Career		514	514	35.0	.469	.352	.755	8.5	8.2	1.3	.5	29.2
All-Star		6	5	20.2	.405	.269	—	2.2	4.8	.2	.0	6.2

==== Playoffs ====
Year	Team	GP	GS	MPG	FG%	3P%	FT%	RPG	APG	SPG	BPG	PPG
2020	Dallas	6	6	35.8	**.500**	.364	.656	**9.8**	8.7	1.2	.5	31.0
2021	Dallas	7	7	40.1	.490	**.408**	.529	7.9	**10.3**	1.3	.4	**35.7**
2022	Dallas	15	15	36.8	.455	.345	.770	**9.8**	6.4	1.8	**.6**	31.7
2024	Dallas	**22***	**22***	40.9	.446	.322	.765	9.5	8.1	**1.9**	.4	28.9
2025	L.A. Lakers	5	5	**41.6**	.452	.348	**.891**	7.0	5.8	1.0	**.6**	30.2
Career		55	55	39.2	.461	.347	.737	9.2	7.8	1.6	.5	30.9

=== EuroLeague ===
†	Denotes season in which Dončić won the EuroLeague
*	Led the league

Year	Team	GP	GS	MPG	FG%	3P%	FT%	RPG	APG	SPG	BPG	PPG	PIR
2015–16	Real Madrid	12	0	11.1	.407	.313	**.882**	2.3	2.0	.2	**.3**	3.5	6.2
2016–17	Real Madrid	**35**	15	19.9	.433	**.371**	.844	4.5	4.2	.9	.2	7.8	13.3
2017–18†	Real Madrid	33	**17**	**25.9**	**.451**	.329	.816	**4.8**	**4.3**	**1.1**	**.3**	**16.0**	**21.5***
Career		80	32	21.0	.443	.344	.828	4.3	3.9	.9	.3	10.6	15.6

=== Liga ACB ===
Cited from ACB.com

Denotes season in which Dončić won the Liga ACB

Year	Team	GP	GS	MPG	FG%	3P%	FT%	RPG	APG	SPG	BPG	PPG	PIR
2014–15	Real Madrid	5	0	4.8	.427	.333	.750	1.2	.0	.0	.0	1.6	1.8
2015–16	Real Madrid	39	0	12.9	**.526**	**.392**	.708	2.6	1.7	.4	.3	4.5	5.9
2016–17	Real Madrid	**42**	11	19.8	.441	.295	**.785**	4.4	3.0	.6	.3	7.5	11.9
2017–18	Real Madrid	37	**21**	**24.3**	.462	.293	.752	**5.7**	**4.7**	**1.1**	**.4**	**12.5**	**18.4**
Career		123	32	18.3	.463	.310	.754	4.1	3.0	.7	.3	7.8	11.6

=== Slovenia ===
Year	Team	GP	GS	MPG	FG%	3P%	FT%	RPG	APG	SPG	BPG	PPG	PIR
FIBA Basketball World Cup
2023	Slovenia	8	8	32.2	.427	.324	.772	7.1	6.1	2.5	.4	27.0	26.0
Olympics
2020	Slovenia	6	6	32.7	.449	.304	.714	9.7	9.5	1.2	1.0	23.8	29.2
EuroBasket
2017 (gold)	Slovenia	9	9	29.1	.406	.311	.848	8.1	3.6	.9	.3	14.3	18.7
2022	Slovenia	7	7	33.2	.496	.322	.702	7.7	6.6	2.0	.6	26.0	27.1
2025	Slovenia	7	7	33.3	.458	.321	.878	8.6	7.1	2.7	.6	34.7	36.6

== NBA achievements ==
=== Regular season ===
- Broke Jason Kidd's Mavericks franchise record (21) of most triple-doubles with 22 in just 122 NBA games
- Youngest player in NBA history to lead the league outright in triple-doubles (21 years, 168 days old). Previously held by Magic Johnson
- Twenty straight games with at least 20 points, 5 rebounds and 5 assists, the most since the 1976–77 ABA–NBA merger. Previously held by Michael Jordan with 18 consecutive games
- First player since Tim Duncan to be selected to All-NBA First Team in a player's first or second season
- First player to lead his team outright in points, rebounds and assists in each of first three games of season
- Second-fewest games played to record 35 career triple-doubles (190). Previously held by Magic Johnson (204)
- Third-fewest games played to reach 4,000 career points since the ABA–NBA merger (Michael Jordan, Shaquille O'Neal)
- First player in NBA history to record:
  - a 60-point, 20-rebound triple-double (60 points, 21 rebounds, 10 assists)
  - 225 points, 50 rebounds and 50 assists in a five-game span
  - a 50-point triple-double average over a two-game span
  - a 30-point triple-double (35 points, 12 rebounds, 10 assists) as a teenager
  - two triple-doubles before the age of 20
  - a 35-point triple-double in a game with 26 minutes or fewer played (35 points, 10 rebounds and 11 assists in 25:30)
  - 30+ points, 10+ rebounds and 15+ assists in a game with 30 minutes or fewer played (31 points, 12 rebounds and 15 assists in 30:05)
  - multiple 30-point triple-doubles in games with 30 minutes or fewer played
  - multiple 40-point triple-doubles before turning 21 years old
  - 200+ points, 50+ rebounds and 50+ assists through the first six games of a season
  - a 25-point triple-double entering halftime (29 points, 10 rebounds, 10 assists)
  - six consecutive 30-point triple-doubles
  - five consecutive 35-point triple-doubles
- Second player in NBA history to:
  - score 30 or more points in the first eight games of a season (Wilt Chamberlain)
- Third player in NBA history to:
  - record multiple 30-point triple-doubles through first three games of a season (Oscar Robertson, Russell Westbrook)
- Fifth player in NBA history to average:
  - a 30-point triple-double in a ten-game span (Oscar Robertson, Michael Jordan, Russell Westbrook, LeBron James)
- Youngest player in NBA history to record:
  - three triple-doubles
  - 35-point triple-doubles in succession, breaking Oscar Robertson's record
  - 1,000 career 3-pointers (24 years, 286 days old)

=== Playoffs ===
- NBA record 42 points in an NBA playoff debut
- First player in NBA history to:
  - record multiple 30-point triple-doubles at the age of 22 or younger
  - record 250+ points, 70+ rebounds and 70+ assists through their first eight career playoff games
  - record two triple-doubles with a game-winning three-pointer in the final five seconds in an NBA playoff game
  - record at least 150 rebounds, 150 assists and 50 3-point field goals in a single postseason
  - lead the playoffs in points, rebounds and assists entering the NBA Finals
  - lead the playoffs in points, rebounds, assists and steals
- Second player in NBA history to record:
  - 70 total points in their first two career playoff games (George Mikan, 75 points in 1949)
  - two triple-doubles in their first four career playoff games (Magic Johnson)
  - 40+ points and 14+ assists in a playoff game (LeBron James)
- Third player in NBA history to record:
  - 300+ points through their first nine career playoff games (Kareem Abdul-Jabbar, Michael Jordan)
- Fourth player in NBA history to record:
  - 600+ points, 150+ rebounds and 150+ assists in a single postseason (Nikola Jokić, LeBron James, Larry Bird)
- Fifth player in NBA history to:
  - have 40+ points and hit a buzzer-beater in a playoff game (Michael Jordan, LeBron James, Kawhi Leonard, Damian Lillard)
  - average at least 30 points, 8 rebounds and 8 assists in a playoff series (Oscar Robertson, Michael Jordan, Russell Westbrook, LeBron James)
- Sixth player in NBA history to:
  - lead their team in points, rebounds and assists while reaching the NBA Finals (Tim Duncan, Jason Kidd, LeBron James, Nikola Jokić, Jayson Tatum)
- Youngest player in NBA history to:
  - hit a playoff buzzer-beater at 21 years and 177 days old

=== Combined (regular season and playoffs) ===
- Most games with 30+ points, 5+ rebounds and 5+ assists in a single season (regular season and playoffs), with 55

== Personal life ==
In July 2023, Dončić got engaged to his longtime girlfriend Anamaria Goltes. On December 1, 2023, their daughter, Gabriela, was born. Their second daughter, Olivia, was born on December 4, 2025. By March 2026, Dončić and Goltes ended their engagement over custody disputes regarding the residency of their daughters.

Dončić speaks four languages: Slovenian, Serbian, English, and Spanish.

In 2017, while playing at Real Madrid, Dončić signed a two-year deal with Nike. In December 2019, it was announced that he had signed a multi-year endorsement deal with Air Jordan including a signature shoe, the Jordan Luka 1. On July 14, 2021, it was announced that Dončić would be the cover athlete for NBA 2K22, the 23rd installment in the NBA 2K video game series. In 2023, Dončić inked a six-year deal with Jordan, solidifying the continuation of his Jordan Luka line.

Dončić's 2018–19 Panini National Treasures basketball card sold for $4.6 million dollars in 2021.

Sports journalist Mina Kimes profiled Dončić in April 2018, writing that he is a gamer and enjoys playing video game franchises, such as Call of Duty, FIFA and Overwatch. Dončić's skill in the latter has been particularly noted, having reached the "Grandmaster" tier in competitive play in March 2023, and later becoming a top 500 player in the tank role in Overwatch 2. In 2018, he was noted as playing Genji and Hanzo, and as a tank player, Dončić plays as Zarya. In 2025, he collaborated with Overwatch ahead of their second season with an advertising campaign featuring Dončić as the hero Cassidy, as well as exclusive in-game rewards.

Dončić's house in the Preston Hollow neighborhood of Dallas was burglarized on December 29, 2024.

== See also ==
- List of NBA career triple-double leaders
- List of NBA career playoff triple-double leaders
- List of NBA single-game scoring leaders
- List of NBA single-season scoring leaders
- List of NBA single-season 3-point scoring leaders
- List of youngest EuroLeague players since the 2000–01 season
- List of European basketball players in the United States
