= Four pointer =

Four-pointer may refer to:

- Four-point play, a rare play in basketball
- Four-pointer, a sporting cliché variant of six-pointer
