= Four-pointer =

Four-pointer may refer to:

- Four-point play, a rare play in basketball
- Four-point field goal, a long shot in games featuring the Harlem Globetrotters or in the BIG3 basketball league
- Six-pointer, an association football cliché that is used in leagues that employ a "three points for a win" system to describe a game between two teams with similar league positions
