= EuroLeague Rising Star =

Annual European basketball award

The EuroLeague Rising Star in an annual award of the EuroLeague, which is the top-tier level European-wide professional club basketball league, that is given to the player the EuroLeague deems its "top rising star". The award began in the 2004–05 season, and the winner is selected by the EuroLeague's head coaches.

Only players who were younger than age 22, on July 1 of the summer before the season started, are eligible for the award.

== Winners ==
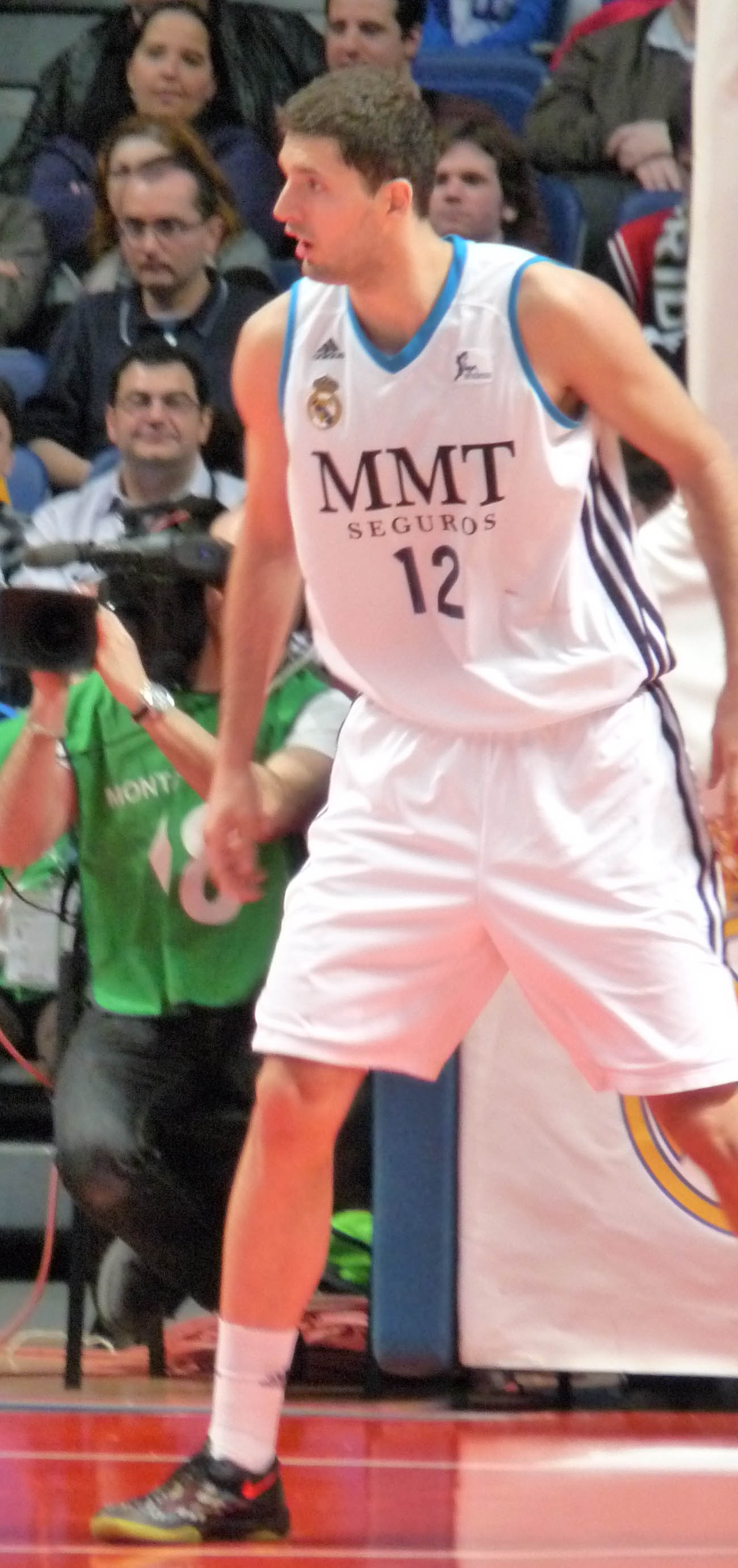
Nikola Mirotić was the first repeat winner, doing so in 2011 & 2012.

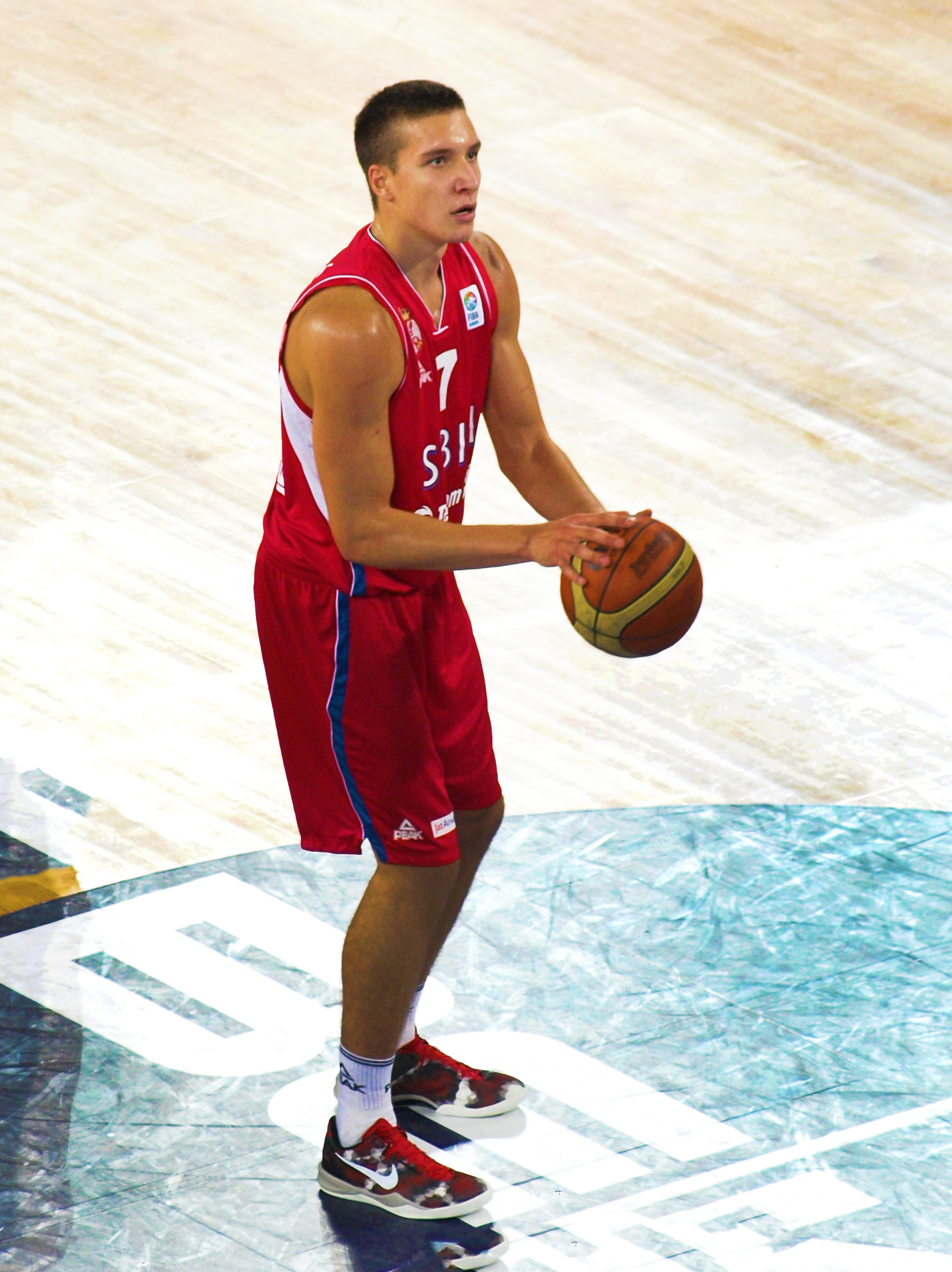
Bogdan Bogdanović was a two-time EuroLeague Rising Star (2014, 2015).

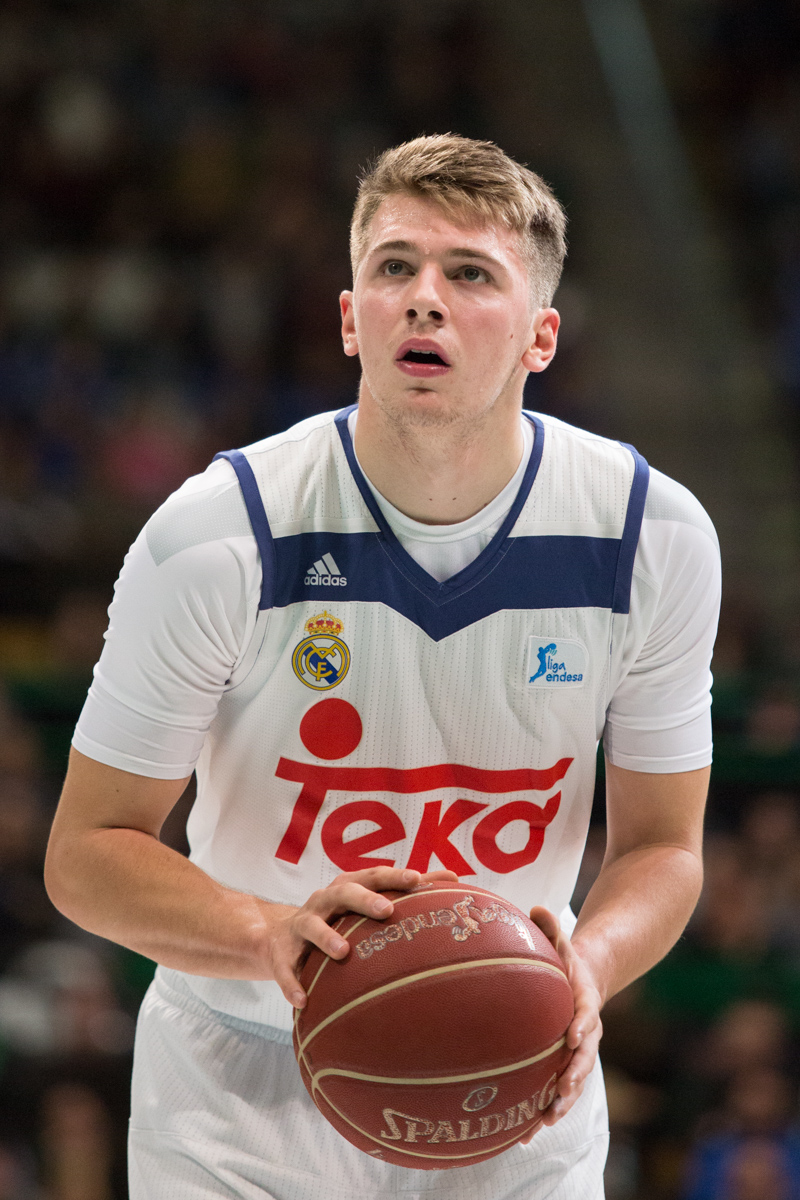
Luka Dončić was a repeat EuroLeague Rising Star in 2017 & 2018.

Season	Rising Star	Team	Ref.
2004–05	(Slovenia) Erazem Lorbek	(Italy) Climamio Bologna	
2005–06	(Italy) Andrea Bargnani	(Italy) Benetton Treviso	
2006–07	(Spain) Rudy Fernández	(Spain) DKV Joventut	
2007–08	(Italy) Danilo Gallinari	(Italy) Armani Jeans Milano	
2008–09	(Serbia) Novica Veličković	(Serbia) Partizan Igokea	
2009–10	(Spain) Ricky Rubio	(Spain) Regal FC Barcelona	
2010–11	(Spain) Nikola Mirotić	(Spain) Real Madrid	
2011–12	(Spain) Nikola Mirotić (2×)	(Spain) Real Madrid	
2012–13	(Greece) Kostas Papanikolaou	(Greece) Olympiacos	
2013–14	(Serbia) Bogdan Bogdanović	(Serbia) Partizan NIS	
2014–15	(Serbia) Bogdan Bogdanović (2×)	(Turkey) Fenerbahçe Ülker	
2015–16	(Spain) Álex Abrines	(Spain) FC Barcelona Lassa	
2016–17	(Slovenia) Luka Dončić	(Spain) Real Madrid	
2017–18	(Slovenia) Luka Dončić (Note: Also won EuroLeague MVP award.) (2×)	(Spain) Real Madrid	
2018–19	(Georgia (country)) Goga Bitadze	(Montenegro) Budućnost VOLI	
2019–20	Not awarded ^{1}		
2020–21	(Spain) Usman Garuba	(Spain) Real Madrid	
2021–22	(Lithuania) Rokas Jokubaitis	(Spain) Barcelona	
2022–23	(Israel) Yam Madar	(Serbia) Partizan Mozzart Bet	
2023–24	(Italy) Gabriele Procida	(Germany) Alba Berlin	
2024–25	(France) Nadir Hifi	(France) Paris Basketball	
2025–26	(Dominican Republic) Jean Montero	(Spain) Valencia Basket	

Notes:

^1 There was no awarding in the 2019–20, because the season was cancelled due to the coronavirus pandemic in Europe.

== Honours ==
=== Players ===
Number	Player
2	(Serbia) Bogdan Bogdanović
2	(Spain) Nikola Mirotić
2	(Slovenia) Luka Dončić

=== Player nationality ===
Number	Country
6	Spain
3	Serbia
3	Slovenia
3	Italy
1	Dominican Republic
1	(Georgia (country)) Georgia
1	Greece
1	Israel
1	Lithuania
1	France

=== Teams ===
Number	Team
5	(Spain) Real Madrid
3	(Spain) Barcelona
3	(Serbia) Partizan
1	(Montenegro) Budućnost
1	(Turkey) Fenerbahçe
1	(Italy) Fortitudo Bologna
1	(Spain) Joventut Badalona
1	(Italy) Olimpia Milano
1	(Greece) Olympiacos
1	(Italy) Treviso
1	(Germany) Alba Berlin
1	(France) Paris Basketball
1	(Spain) Valencia Basket
