= Defense wins championships =

Sports cliché

"Defense wins championships" is a sports cliché and aphorism used, particularly in team sports, to explain that although a team's offense may be captivating or flashy, a championship is captured through effort on defense. The phrase is often credited to American football head coach Bear Bryant, who led the Alabama Crimson Tide to six championships during his tenure with the team.

The term has been commonly used by sports personnel including executives, coaches, and players, as well as media writers. Research on validity to the claim indicates that strong defensive performance does indeed have overlap with championship success, though there exists a roughly equivalent correlation between strong offensive performance and championship success.

== History and usage ==
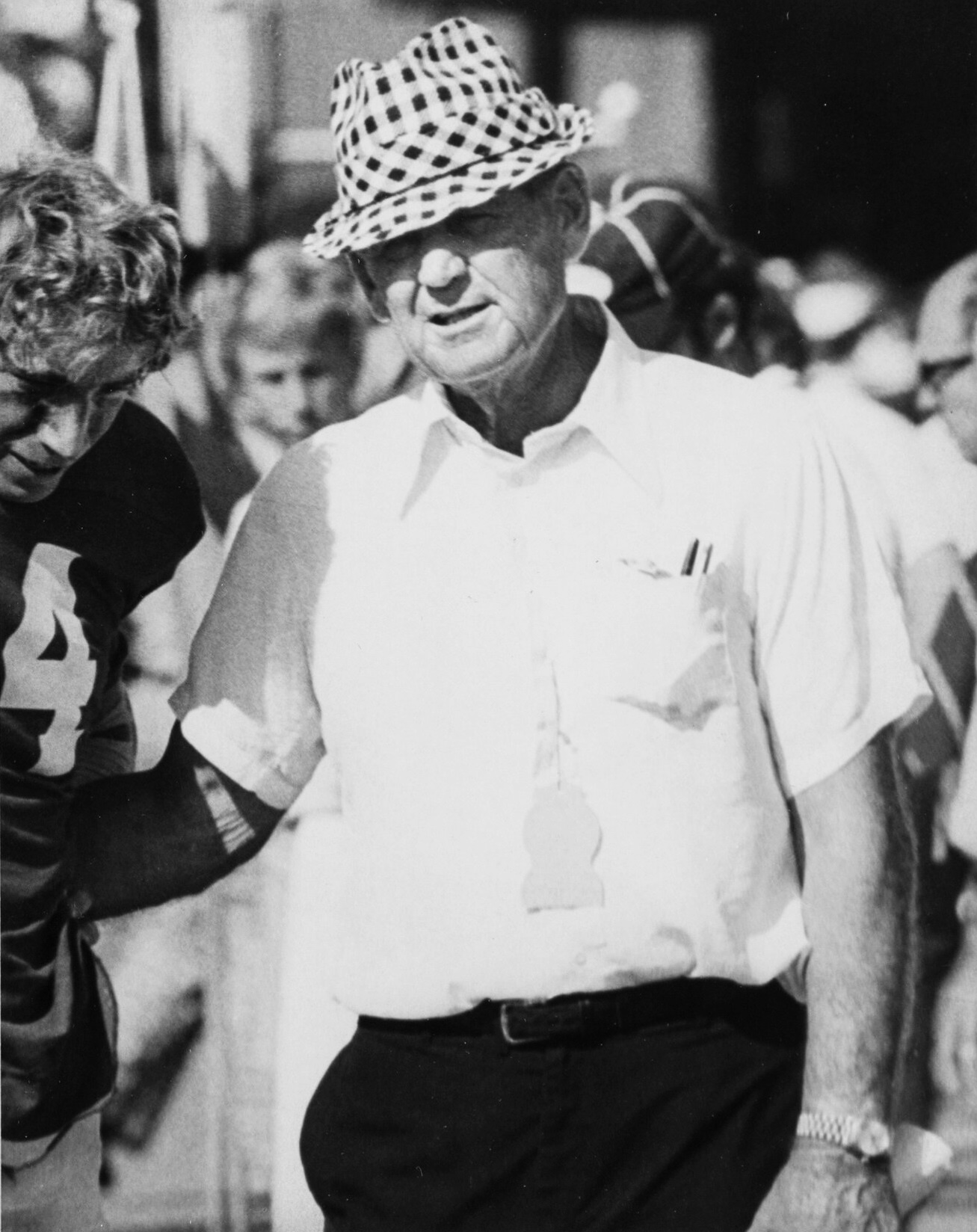
Bear Bryant (pictured in 1977) is credited with coining the phrase

Paul "Bear" Bryant is often credited with coining the phrase, which stems from a longer quote attributed to him: "Offense sells tickets. Defense wins championships". The quote has also been alternatively attributed to Bryant, or re-quoted as "Offense wins games. Defense wins championships". Bryant was the head coach of the Alabama Crimson Tide football team from 1958 to 1982. During his tenure, Alabama won six national championships. Crimson Tide teams during the 1960s and 1970s were notably dominant on the defensive side of the ball.

Other coaches, team executives, and players themselves have also been quoted invoking the phrase. Seattle Sounders FC head coach Brian Schmetzer has stated "Defense wins championships. It's true in many different sports, certainly in ours [soccer]". Dallas Mavericks general manager Nico Harrison used the phrase when defending his trade of Luka Dončić to the Los Angeles Lakers in February 2025. Philadelphia Eagles quarterback Jalen Hurts used the phrase when complimenting his defensive teammates following the team's win in Super Bowl LIX.

The phrase has also become commonly used by sportswriters, (Note: Examples of sportswriters using the phrase in prose or in article headlines posing the question "does defense win championships?" include:) to the point of cliché. Though the phrase remains commonly used in American football–both at the collegiate level and professionally in the National Football League (NFL)–the term has become ubiquitous in sports media, being applied to other team sports. Former NFL player Domonique Foxworth has criticized the cliché nature of the phrase, writing "Like any catchy phrase, the cliché once meant something very specific, but after years of overuse, the meaning of these weathered words has eroded to a dull platitude".

== Research and analysis ==
Some statistical analysis by academic researchers and sports media members alike have provided moderate pushback on the adage's assertion. Research on the concept has shown that good offensive play in addition to good defensive play leads to championships, rather than just the latter, and that the correlation between defensive performance and playoff success is similar to the correlation between offensive performance and playoff success. Jared Mueller of USA Today has gone a step further, giving a firm edge to offensive performance. Ahead of Super Bowl LVI, Mueller wrote that "A look at Super Bowl participants since 2011 shows very clearly that almost always only great offenses make the big game".

Mark Otten, an associate professor of psychology at California State University, Northridge (CSUN) wrote about a study he contributed to; writing on the study's analysis of NFL champions, Otten stated "After running some regression analyses, we found that defense, indeed, does win championships. The fewer [...] yards a team allowed in the regular season, the more playoff wins they tended to have", but added that "the same analysis revealed that yards gained offensively during the season correlated similarly – nearly identically, in fact – with subsequent playoff success". Gary Sutton, author of Statistics Slam Dunk: Statistical Analysis with R on Real NBA Data, wrote that tests conducted by him and his collaborators "all strongly suggest that defense might be slightly more important than offense" and "there's no evidence that defense clearly and unmistakably matters more than offense". Sutton and his collaborators applied three different statistical techniques in their research on the topic: correlation tests, ANOVAs, and logistic regressions.

== See also ==
- List of sports clichés
- The best defense is a good offense
- Winning isn't everything; it's the only thing
