= Gabriele Procida =

Italian basketball player (born 2002)

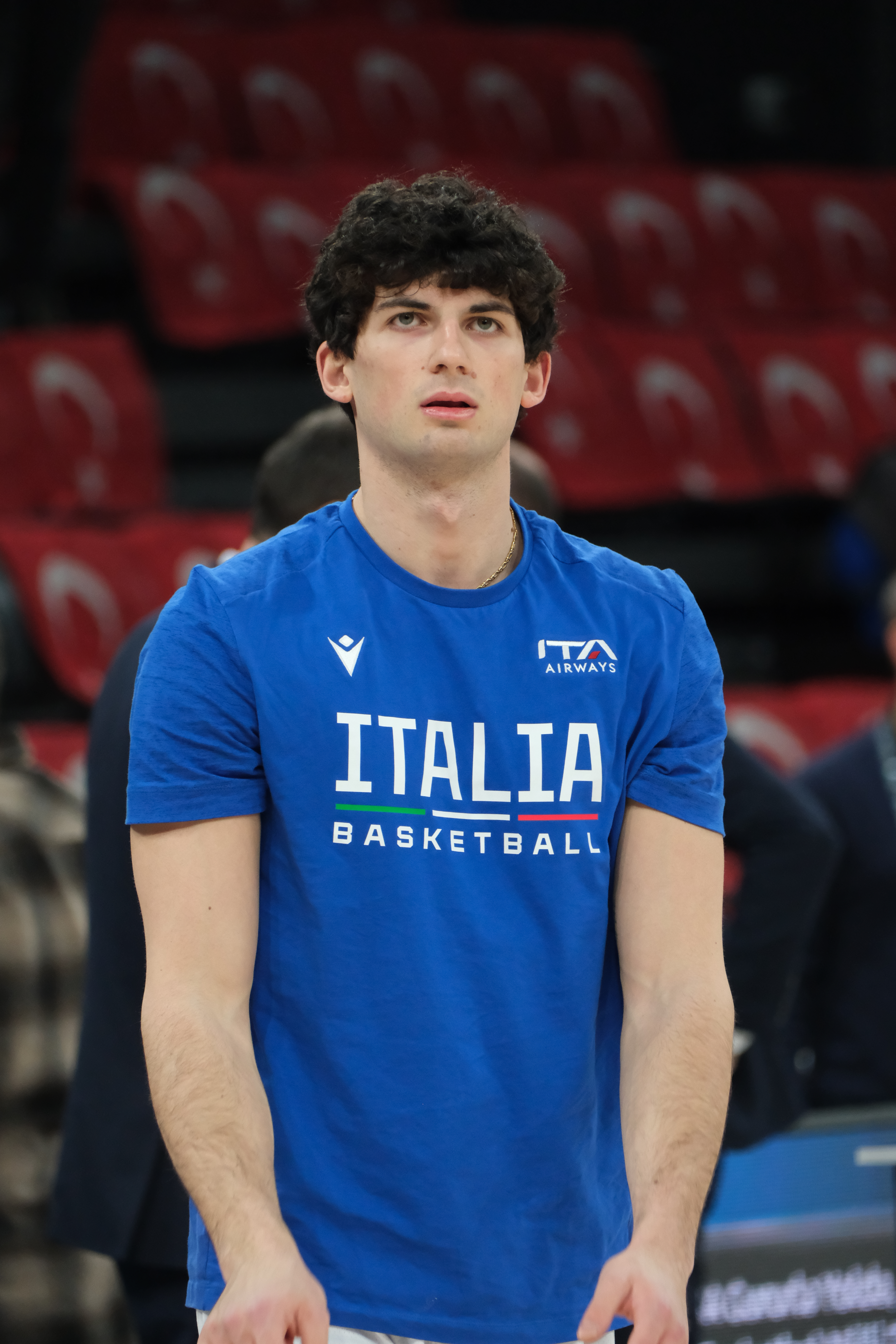
- Procida with the Italian national team in 2025

No. 9 – Real Madrid
- Position: Small forward / shooting guard
- League: Liga ACB; EuroLeague

Personal information
- Born: 1 June 2002 (age 24) Como, Italy
- Listed height: 6 ft 7 in (2.01 m)
- Listed weight: 88 kg (194 lb)

Career information
- NBA draft: 2022: 2nd round, 36th overall pick
- Drafted by: Portland Trail Blazers
- Playing career: 2019–present

Career history
- 2019–2021: Pallacanestro Cantù
- 2021–2022: Fortitudo Bologna
- 2022–2025: Alba Berlin
- 2025–present: Real Madrid

Career highlights
- EuroLeague Rising Star (2024)
- Stats at Basketball Reference

Gabriele Procida (born 1 June 2002) is an Italian professional basketball player for Real Madrid of the Liga ACB and the EuroLeague. He was selected in the second round of the 2022 NBA draft by the Portland Trail Blazers with the 36th overall pick.

== Early life and youth career ==
Procida grew up playing basketball for Pallacanestro Cantù at the youth level. He competed for the youth teams of Stella Azzurra and Virtus Bologna at the Next Generation Tournament.

== Professional career ==
On 13 October 2019, at age 17, Procida made his professional debut for Pallacanestro Cantù in a Lega Basket Serie A (LBA) game against Reyer Venezia. On 19 June 2020, he signed a four-year contract with Cantù. On 24 January 2021, Procida scored 24 points in a 107–83 loss to VL Pesaro. At 18 years, seven months and 23 days of age, he became the third-youngest player in league history to score at least 24 points in a game, behind Luigi Datome and Carlos Delfino.

On 30 May 2021, Procida declared for the 2021 NBA draft. On 7 July he left Cantù, after the club was relegated to Serie A2, and signed a multi-year contract with Fortitudo Bologna.

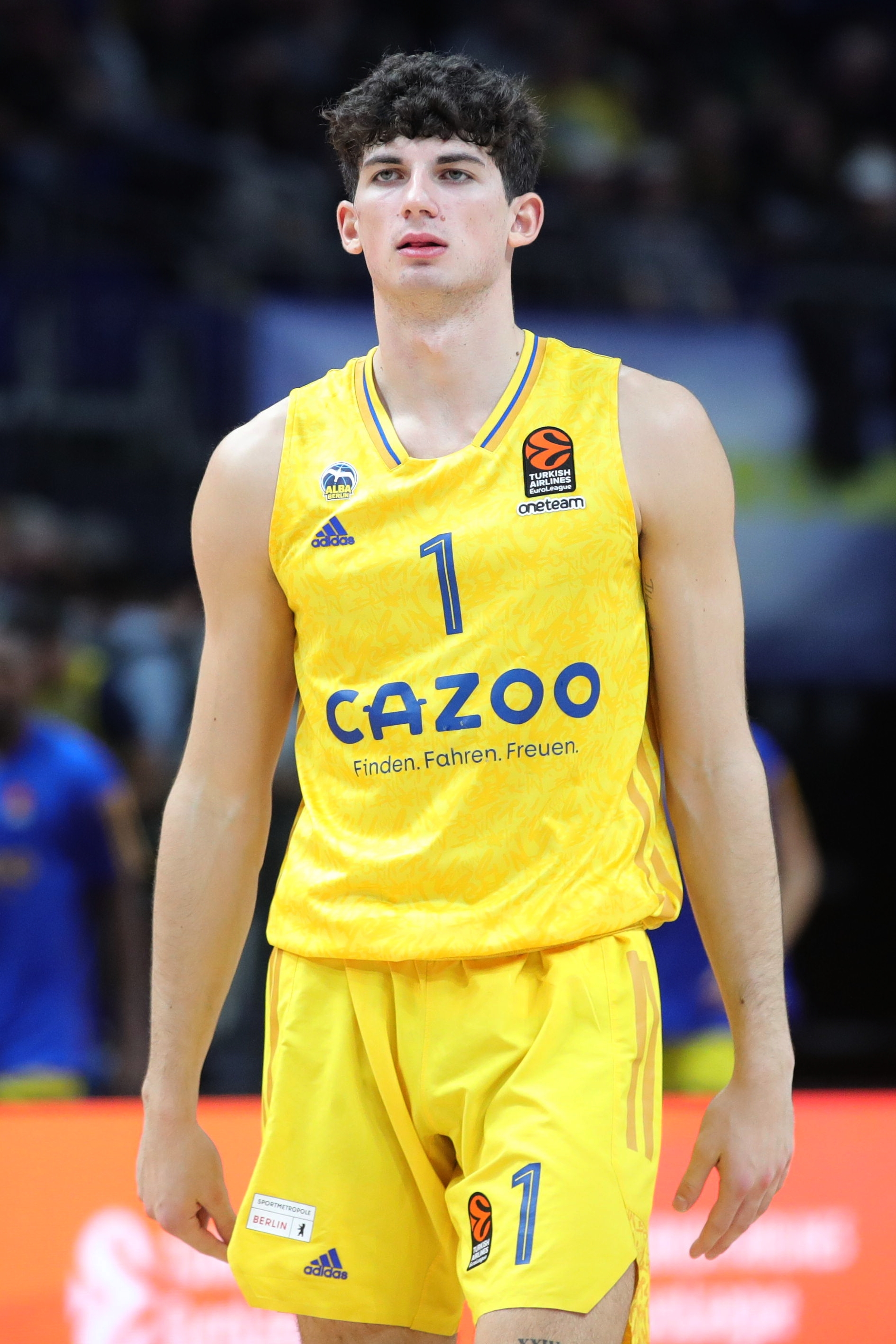
Procida with Alba Berlin in 2022

On 8 July 2022, Procida signed with Alba Berlin of the Basketball Bundesliga.

On 16 February 2023, Procida was announced as one of the candidates for the EuroLeague Rising Star award, which was ultimately won by Yam Madar. Procida won the award the following year after averaging 8.3 points and 1.4 steals in the 2023–24 EuroLeague season.

On 25 July 2025, Procida signed with Real Madrid of the Spanish Liga ACB and the EuroLeague.

=== NBA rights ===
In May 2022, Procida declared for the NBA draft for the second year in a row. During the event itself, on 23 June 2022, he was subsequently selected by Portland Trail Blazers as their second-round pick and the 36th pick of the night overall, before being immediately traded to Detroit Pistons.

On 8 February 2024, the draft rights to Procida were traded to the Utah Jazz alongside Kevin Knox and a future second round pick for Simone Fontecchio.

== National team career ==
Procida represented Italy at the 2018 FIBA U16 European Championship in Serbia, averaging 10.1 points and 2.9 rebounds per game. He averaged 13.1 points, 4.6 rebounds and 2.3 assists per game for Italy at the 2019 FIBA U18 European Championship in Greece.

On 19 February 2021, Procida made his Italian senior national team debut, playing five minutes against Estonia during EuroBasket 2022 qualification.

== Career statistics ==
Legend
GP	Games played	GS	Games started	MPG	Minutes per game
FG%	Field-goal percentage	3P%	3-point field-goal percentage	FT%	Free-throw percentage
RPG	Rebounds per game	APG	Assists per game	SPG	Steals per game
BPG	Blocks per game	PPG	Points per game	PIR	Performance index rating
**Bold**	Career high

=== EuroLeague ===
Year	Team	GP	GS	MPG	FG%	3P%	FT%	RPG	APG	SPG	BPG	PPG	PIR
2022–23	Alba Berlin	**27**	4	14.6	.399	.241	.758	1.8	.5	.5	.3	5.7	4.0
2023–24	Alba Berlin	25	3	17.4	.424	**.290**	.756	1.6	**.9**	**1.4**	**.4**	8.3	**8.0**
2024–25	Alba Berlin	26	**17**	**20.5**	**.439**	.219	**.786**	**2.2**	.8	.7	.3	**9.7**	7.7
Career		78	24	17.5	.420	.250	.767	1.8	.7	.8	.3	7.9	6.6

=== Domestic leagues ===
Year	Team	League	GP	MPG	FG%	3P%	FT%	RPG	APG	SPG	BPG	PPG
2019–20	(Italy) Cantù	LBA	7	4.0	.429	.500	—	.4	—	—	—	1.3
2020–21	(Italy) Cantù	LBA	28	15.5	.445	.388	.630	2.5	.6	.4	.1	6.3
2021–22	(Italy) Fortitudo Bologna	LBA	26	18.5	.522	.383	.784	3.0	.7	.8	.3	7.0
2022–23	(Germany) Alba Berlin	BBL	26	16.9	.417	.303	.800	2.6	.7	.9	.1	6.8
2023–24	(Germany) Alba Berlin	BBL	13	17.1	.475	.405	.791	1.5	1.5	1.2	.1	9.6
