= List of sports clichés =

This is a list of clichés related to sports.

== Clichés ==
=== Sports clichés used in business ===
According to Don R. Powell, licensed psychologist and president of the American Institute for Preventive Medicine, sports clichés are used in about 50 percent of corporate boardrooms. They provide a shorthand to quickly communicate ideas. According to Powell, "We have a love/hate relationship with cliches. Although we complain about them, we are enamored with them. That's because they always seem to fit."

- "It was a slam dunk."
- "It's gut-check time."
- "Keep your eye on the ball."
- "Monday-Morning Quarterback"
- "That was a hole in one."
- "They don't pull any punches."
- "They dropped the ball."
- "They always step up to the plate."
- "They talk a good game."
- "They're a team player."
- "They're in a league of their own."
- "They want to play hardball."
- "The ball's in your court."
- "They answered the bell."
- "We knocked it out of the park."
- "Take one for the team."
- "Offense sells tickets, defense wins championships."
- "You gotta want it."

=== Sports clichés used in sports announcing ===
- "A 2–0 lead is the worst lead"
- "Alligator arms"
- "They have to have a great game for their team to win."
- "They have to get on the same page."
- "The media are blowing this out of proportion."
- "That will come back to haunt them."
- "I'd like to thank my Lord and savior."
- "Throw under the bus."
- "D-Line or O-Line."
- "A lot of open looks at the basket."
- "It doesn't get any better than this."
- "He's a warrior."
- "Defense wins championships."
- "The best defense is a good offense."
- "Midfield maestro" is a term used in association football to describe a midfield player who excels in the technical and creative aspects of midfield play and who often create goalscoring opportunities for the attackers, while at the same time controlling the tempo of the match and raising the game of the other members of the team.
- "Charity Stripe"
- "Goals are not deserved, goals are made"
- "On any given Sunday . . ."
- "Play one game at a time"
- "There is no 'I' in 'team'"
- "There ain't no 'U' either'" - as a retort to "There is no 'I' in 'team'"

=== Sports film clichés ===
- A down and out coach is offered one last shot.
- The coach can't get along with his star player.
- Someone doubts the protagonist's abilities, and is made to believe in them.
- The players overcome race relations or gang violence, and are brought together by being a team.
- The opposing team is larger, better dressed, better equipped yet end up defeated by the protagonist's team.
- A death or injury provides the main character with the extra incentive to win.
- The main character is considered too old to win, yet does.
- An emotional speech inspires the protagonists.
- Near the end of the movie it will seem that the protagonist's team has no chance of winning, but they quickly bounce back with little time left.
- The protagonist's team makes a valiant comeback effort only to fall just short at the last second (Puck hits the post, shot rims out, etc.). This is immediately followed by a dramatic montage with tear soaked hugs of players and coaches who are genuinely better off for the experience.
- After a supreme achievement on the sports field/court/diamond, the achiever will, for no apparent reason, extend his arm and use his forefinger to point, for an extended period of time, to a team-mate, coach or even someone in the crowd. In many cases, the person being pointed to will, inexplicably, return the gesture.

== Criticism ==
According to Michael McCarthy, a USA Today sports television writer, sports announcers overuse clichés during their broadcasts. Sports critic Bill Mayo disagrees, saying that sports clichés are used "just the right amount," and "it is what it is."

Former New York Giants quarterback-turned CBS broadcaster Phil Simms devotes a large portion of his 2004 book Sunday Morning Quarterback to examining football clichés such as "winning the turnover battle", "halftime adjustments", and "managing the game."
