= Six-pointer =

Association football cliche

"Six-pointer" is a sporting cliché, particularly used in association football, used to describe a game between two teams with similar league positions, in leagues that employ a "three points for a win" system. In a "two points for a win" league, the corresponding term is "four-pointer". In a six-pointer game, the result is particularly crucial since the winning team denies three points to the close rival in addition to securing three points for itself.

The term is normally reserved for the latter part of the season, when the league standings approach the ranking they will have at the end of the season. Therefore, the result of the game is likely to have a significant bearing on which of the two teams will eventually finish in the higher position. The term may be applied to a match either between two teams both chasing the championship or promotion, or else between two teams both near the bottom of the table — a "relegation six pointer". The term may also be applied for teams chasing a playoff tournament position, as seen with teams in North America's Major League Soccer.

For example, suppose the standings before a match between Team A and Team B are as follows:

Team	Points
Team A	40
Team B	38

If Team A wins the match, they will be five points ahead:

Team	Points
Team A	43
Team B	38

If Team A loses the match, they will be one point behind:

Team	Points
Team B	41
Team A	40

Thus, for Team A, the difference between winning and losing represents a six-point differential with respect to their rivals, Team B (five ahead versus one behind); even though it only represents a three-point differential with respect to all other teams in the league (43 points versus 40 points). A similar analysis to this match applies for Team B.

In Australia the term six pointer can also be used in association football to describe a poor shot at goal, where the ball goes between the posts but very high over the bar. It alludes to Australian rules football, where a goal (worth 6 points) is scored at any height between goalposts which have no crossbar.

== See also ==
- List of sports clichés
