= The best defense is a good offense =

Adage that proactivity is stronger than passivity

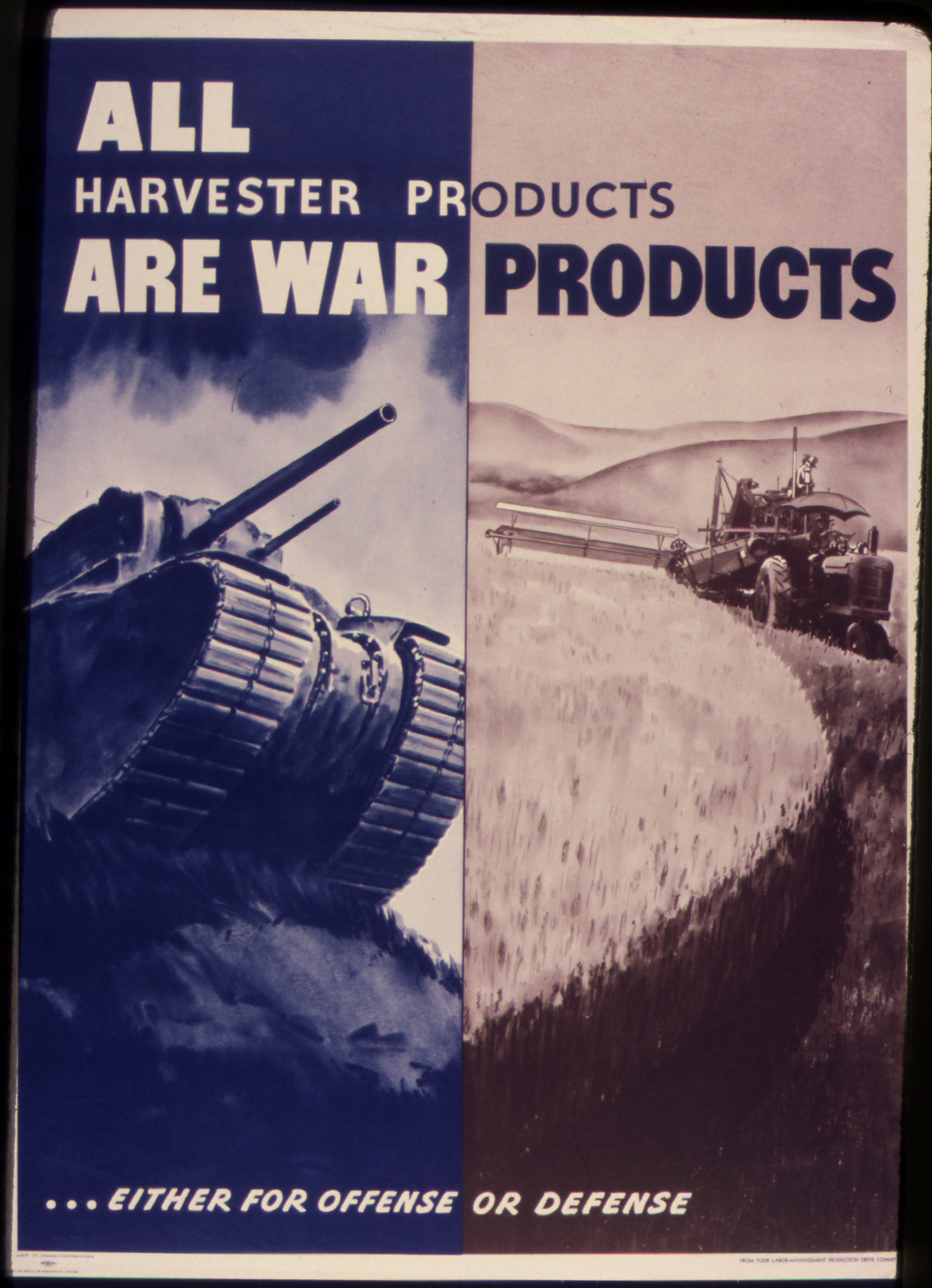
All Harvester Products are war products... either for offense or defense. – United States Office for Emergency Management. War Production Board (c. 1942 – 1943).

"The best defense is a good offense" is an adage that has been applied to many fields of endeavor, including games and military combat. It is also known as the strategic offensive principle of war. Generally, the idea is that proactivity (a strong offensive action) instead of a passive attitude will preoccupy the opposition and ultimately hinder its ability to mount an opposing counterattack, leading to a strategic advantage.

== Military ==
George Washington wrote in 1799: "...make them believe, that offensive operations, often times, is the surest, if not the only (in some cases) means of defence".

Mao Zedong opined that "the only real defense is active defense", meaning defense for the purpose of counter-attacking and taking the offensive. Often success rests on destroying the enemy's ability to attack.

Some martial arts emphasize attack over defense. Wing chun, for example, is a style of kung fu which uses the maxim: "The hand which strikes also blocks."

During World War I, Germany planned to attack France so as to quickly knock it out of the war, thereby reducing the Entente's numerical superiority and to free up German troops to head east and defeat Russia.

== Games ==
In some board games, such as Risk, one's ability to build up armies depends on aggressively attacking so as to acquire territory; however, in Risk, luck in rolling the dice is the ultimate determining factor. Players who fail to do so, and concentrate instead on holding the line against enemy attack, will likely end up in a weak position. In-depth info argues that this adage does not always apply: "When the battle rages between two players one should put every ounce of power in the offense, but when several players are involved, the political element changes this dynamic."

In chess, one's ability to prevent enemy attacks often depends on maintaining the initiative – i.e., making a series of threats that the opponent must use his turns to parry, rather than launching his own attacks; thus, common tips used in conjunction with this adage are that the best way to upset an opponent's plans is to become menacing and that the best way to stop an enemy threat to one's own king is to attack the opponent's.

In sports such as football and basketball, the adage is used to note that success can hinge on an effective offense that keeps the ball on the other team's side of the field, thus not only creating scoring opportunities but preventing the opposing team from scoring.

== Business ==
The adage has also been applied in the intellectual property realm, in reference to patent trolls.

== Law ==
The adage has also been applied in court where the defense counsel attacks and breaks the prosecutor's case. It is the prosecution's burden to prove its case beyond reasonable doubt.

There are strict rules of criminal procedure code which require the prosecution to first prove a prima facie case, before the defense could be called or even invited to set out material aspects of its position, and the prosecution's task to present its case at the trial.

== Film ==
In the Star Trek: The Original Series episode "The Empath", Captain Kirk says, "The best defense is a good offense, and I intend to start offending right now."

== See also ==
- Deterrence theory
- Preemptive war
- Shock and awe
