= 2017–18 Real Madrid Baloncesto season =

Real Madrid
2017–18 season
- Chairman: Florentino Pérez
- Head coach: Pablo Laso
- Arena: WiZink Center
- Liga ACB: Winners (defeated Kirolbet Baskonia)
- EuroLeague: Winners (defeated Fenerbahçe Doğuş)
- Copa del Rey: Runners-up (lost to Barcelona)
- Supercopa: Semi-finals (knocked out by Gran Canaria)
- Highest home attendance: 12,144 (vs Panathinaikos Superfoods, 27 April 2018)
- Lowest home attendance: 4,108 (vs Real Betis Energía Plus, 9 May 2018)
- Average home attendance: 9,238
| Home | Away |

The 2017–18 season was Real Madrid's 87th in existence, their 35th consecutive season in the top flight of Spanish basketball and 11th consecutive season in the top flight of European basketball.

The season was an extremely successful one, as Real Madrid won a record tenth EuroLeague title after defeating Fenerbahçe in the final. In the domestic Liga ACB, Madrid clinched the title after defeating Saski Baskonia in the playoff finals. The star player of this season was Slovenian Luka Dončić, who was named EuroLeague MVP, EuroLeague Final Four MVP and Liga ACB MVP.

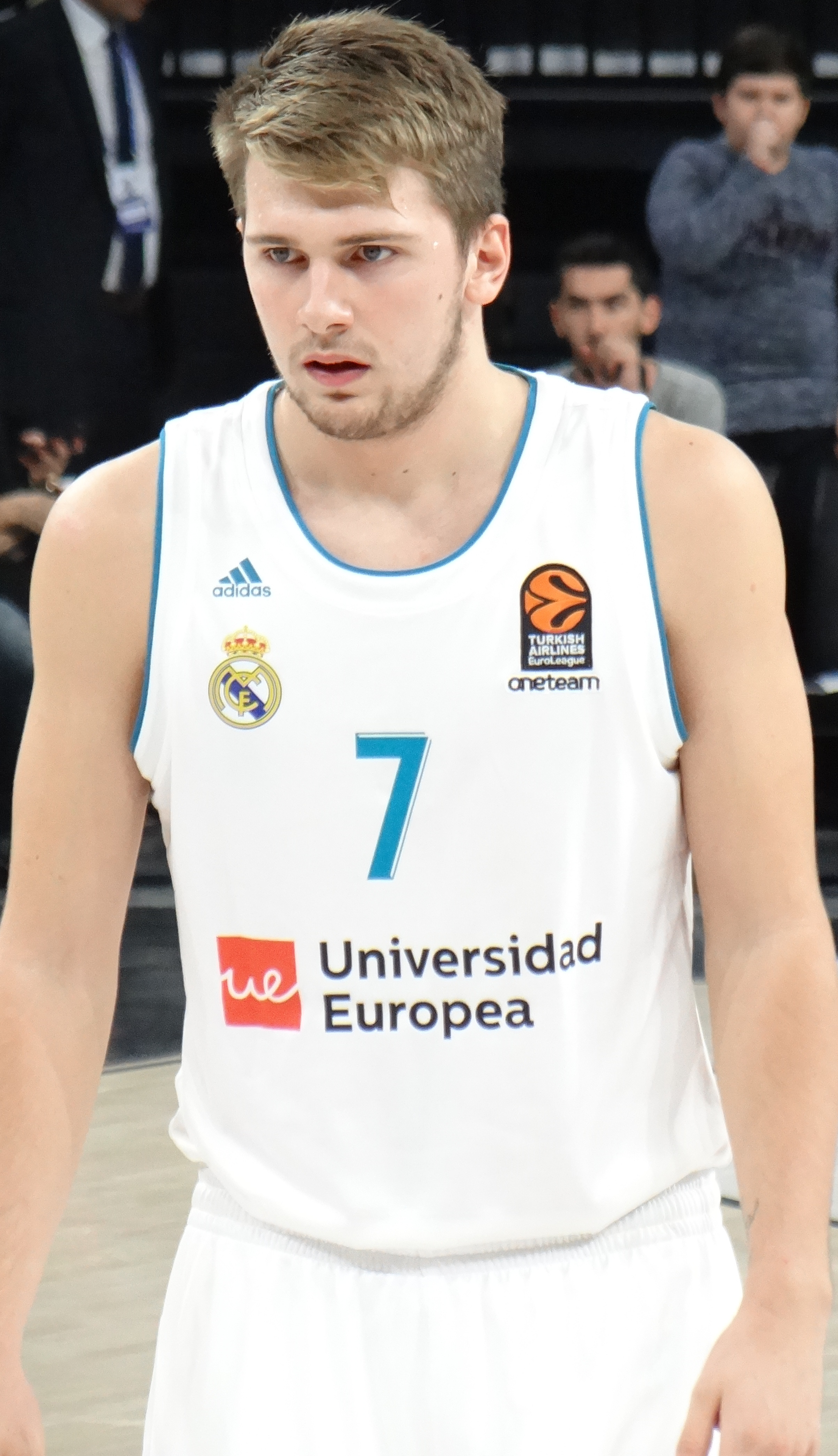
Luka Dončić won EuroLeague MVP, EuroLeague Final Four MVP and Liga ACB MVP honors.

== Players ==
=== Squad information ===
Note: Flags indicate national team eligibility at FIBA-sanctioned events. Players may hold other non-FIBA nationalities not displayed.

Real Madrid roster
Players
Coaches

| Pos. | No. | Nat. | Name | Ht. | Wt. | Age |
|---|---|---|---|---|---|---|
| C | 14 | (Mexico) | Ayón, Gustavo | 2.08 m (6 ft 10 in) | 113 kg (249 lb) | 33 – 1 April 1985 |
| PG | 11 | (Argentina) | Campazzo, Facundo | 1.81 m (5 ft 11 in) | 88 kg (194 lb) | 27 – 23 March 1991 |
| SG | 20 | (Azerbaijan) | Carroll, Jaycee | 1.88 m (6 ft 2 in) | 84 kg (185 lb) | 35 – 16 April 1983 |
| G/F | 1 | (France) | Causeur, Fabien | 1.96 m (6 ft 5 in) | 91 kg (201 lb) | 31 – 16 June 1987 |
| G/F | 7 | (Slovenia) | Dončić, Luka | 2.01 m (6 ft 7 in) | 99 kg (218 lb) | 19 – 28 February 1999 |
| G/F | 5 | (Spain) | Fernández, Rudy | 1.98 m (6 ft 6 in) | 84 kg (185 lb) | 33 – 4 April 1985 |
| C | 32 | (Serbia) | Kuzmić, Ognjen | 2.13 m (7 ft 0 in) | 114 kg (251 lb) | 28 – 16 May 1990 |
| G | 23 | (Spain) | Llull, Sergio | 1.92 m (6 ft 4 in) | 95.4 kg (210 lb) | 30 – 15 November 1987 |
| F | 6 | (Montenegro) | Radončić, Dino | 2.02 m (6 ft 8 in) | 102 kg (225 lb) | 19 – 8 January 1999 |
| PG | 2 | (United States) | Randle, Chasson | 1.88 m (6 ft 2 in) | 84 kg (185 lb) | 25 – 5 March 1993 |
| PF | 3 | (Slovenia) | Randolph, Anthony | 2.11 m (6 ft 11 in) | 104 kg (229 lb) | 28 – 15 July 1989 |
| F/C | 9 | (Spain) | Reyes, Felipe (C) | 2.06 m (6 ft 9 in) | 118 kg (260 lb) | 38 – 16 March 1980 |
| G/F | 44 | (Sweden) | Taylor, Jeffery | 2.01 m (6 ft 7 in) | 102 kg (225 lb) | 29 – 23 May 1989 |
| PF | 33 | (United States) | Thompkins, Trey | 2.08 m (6 ft 10 in) | 111 kg (245 lb) | 28 – 29 May 1990 |
| C | 22 | (Cape Verde) | Tavares, Walter | 2.21 m (7 ft 3 in) | 120 kg (265 lb) | 26 – 22 March 1992 |
| G/F | 16 | (Spain) | Yusta, Santiago | 2.00 m (6 ft 7 in) | 83 kg (183 lb) | 21 – 28 April 1997 |

Head coach

- (Spain) Pablo Laso

Assistant coach(es)

- (Spain) Jesús Mateo
- (Spain) Francisco Redondo
- (Spain) Isidoro Calín

Fitness trainer(s)

- (Spain) Juan Trapero

Legend

- (C) Team captain
- (EBA) On assignment to Liga EBA affiliate
- Injured

- Roster
- Transactions
Updated: November 17, 2017

=== Depth chart ===
| Pos. | Starting 5 | Bench 1 | Bench 2 | Bench 3 |
|---|---|---|---|---|
| C | Gustavo Ayón | Edy Tavares | Ognjen Kuzmić |
| PF | Anthony Randolph | Felipe Reyes | Trey Thompkins |
| SF | Jeffery Taylor | Rudy Fernández | Santiago Yusta | Dino Radončić |
| SG | Luka Dončić | Jaycee Carroll | Fabien Causeur |
| PG | Sergio Llull | Facundo Campazzo | Chasson Randle |

Colours: Blue = homegrown player; Red = non–FIBA Europe player

=== Players in ===
| No. | Pos. | Nat. | Name | Age | Moving from | | Type | Ends | Transfer fee | Date | Source |
|---|---|---|---|---|---|---|---|---|---|---|---|
| 16 | SF | (Spain) | Santiago Yusta | 20 | Obradoiro | (Spain) | Transfer | 2019 | | 3 July 2017 | |
| 1 | G | (France) | Fabien Causeur | 30 | Brose Bamberg | (Germany) | Transfer | 2019 | | 25 July 2017 | |
| 32 | C | (Serbia) | Ognjen Kuzmić | 27 | Crvena zvezda | (Serbia) | Transfer | 2019 | | 26 July 2017 | |
| 11 | PG | (Argentina) | Facundo Campazzo | 26 | UCAM Murcia | (Spain) | Loan returns | 2019 | | 24 August 2017 | |
| 2 | PG | (United States) | Chasson Randle | 24 | New York Knicks | (United States) | Transfer | 2019 | | 7 October 2017 | |
| 22 | C | (Cape Verde) | Edy Tavares | 25 | Raptors 905 | (Canada) | Transfer | 2020 | | 10 November 2017 | |

=== Players out ===
| No. | Pos. | Nat. | Name | Age | Moving to | | Type | Transfer fee | Date | Source |
|---|---|---|---|---|---|---|---|---|---|---|
| 6 | F | (Argentina) | Andrés Nocioni | 37 | | | Retirement | | 3 April 2017 | |
| 4 | PG | (Croatia) | Dontaye Draper | 33 | Real Betis Energía Plus | (Spain) | End of contract | | 1 July 2017 | |
| 21 | C | (United States) | Othello Hunter | 30 | CSKA Moscow | (Russia) | End of contract | | 10 July 2017 | |
| 36 | PF | (Spain) | Álex Suárez | 29 | Basket Zaragoza | (Spain) | loan Out | | 17 August 2017 | |
| 8 | SF | (Lithuania) | Jonas Mačiulis | 33 | Lokomotiv Kuban | (Russia) | Release | | 2 March 2018 | |

== Club ==
=== Technical staff ===
| Position | Staff |
|---|---|
| Head coach | Pablo Laso |
| Assistant coach | Jesús Mateo; Francisco Redondo; Isidoro Calín |
| Fitness trainer | Juan Trapero |

Source: Real Madrid

=== Kit ===
Supplier: Adidas / Sponsor: Universidad Europea

| Home | Away |

== Pre-season and friendlies ==
Win Loss

| 8 September 2017 | Real Madrid (Spain) | 79–51 | (Germany) Alba Berlin | Madrid, Spain |
| | Scoring by quarter: 12-15, 26-7, 19-18, 22-11 |
| | | | | Arena: WiZink Center |

| 12 September 2017 | Real Madrid (Spain) | 81–84 | (Argentina) San Lorenzo | Madrid, Spain |
| | Scoring by quarter: 19-26, 23-15, 26-18, 13-25 |
| | | | | Arena: WiZink Center |

| 16 September 2017 | Bayern Munich (Germany) | 80–72 | (Spain) Real Madrid | Munich, Germany |
| | Scoring by quarter: 19-11, 21-18, 18-23, 22-20 |
| | | | | Arena: Audi Dome |

== Competitions ==
=== Overall ===
| Competition | Started round | Final position / round | First match | Last match |
|---|---|---|---|---|
| Liga ACB | Matchday 1 | Winner | 1 October 2017 | 20 June 2018 |
| Euroleague | Regular season | Winner | 12 October 2017 | 20 May 2018 |
| Copa del Rey | Quarterfinals | Runners-up | 15 February 2018 | 18 February 2018 |
| Supercopa de España | Semifinals | Semifinalists | 22 September 2017 | |

Updated to match played June 20, 2018
Source: Competitions

=== Overview ===
| Competition | Record | | | | | | | |
| Competition | Pld | W | D | L | PF | PA | PD | Win % |
|---|---|---|---|---|---|---|---|---|
| Liga ACB | 43 | 38 | 0 | 5 | 3,896 | 3,418 | +478 | 88.37 |
| EuroLeague | 36 | 24 | 0 | 12 | 3,079 | 2,871 | +208 | 66.67 |
| Copa del Rey | 3 | 2 | 0 | 1 | 256 | 235 | +21 | 66.67 |
| Supercopa de España | 1 | 0 | 0 | 1 | 64 | 73 | −9 | 0.00 |
| Total | 83 | 64 | 0 | 19 | 7,295 | 6,597 | +698 | 77.11 |

Last updated: June 20, 2018
Source: Competitions

=== Liga ACB ===
==== League table ====
| Pos | Team | Pld | W | L | PF | PA | PD | Qualification or relegation |
|---|---|---|---|---|---|---|---|---|
| 1 | Real Madrid | 34 | 30 | 4 | 3052 | 2678 | +374 | Qualification to playoffs |
| 2 | Kirolbet Baskonia | 34 | 25 | 9 | 2946 | 2668 | +278 | Qualification to playoffs |
| 3 | FC Barcelona Lassa | 34 | 24 | 10 | 3030 | 2691 | +339 | Qualification to playoffs |
| 4 | Valencia Basket | 34 | 22 | 12 | 2809 | 2582 | +227 | Qualification to playoffs |
| 5 | Herbalife Gran Canaria | 34 | 20 | 14 | 2851 | 2780 | +71 | Qualification to playoffs |

Source: ACB

==== Results summary ====
| Overall | | | | | | Home | | | | | Away | | | | |
| Pld | W | L | PF | PA | PD | W | L | PF | PA | PD | W | L | PF | PA | PD |
|---|---|---|---|---|---|---|---|---|---|---|---|---|---|---|---|
| 34 | 30 | 4 | 3052 | 2678 | +374 | 16 | 1 | 1565 | 1321 | +244 | 14 | 3 | 1487 | 1357 | +130 |

Last updated: May 25, 2018.
Source: Competitive matches

==== Results by round ====
| Round | 1 | 2 | 3 | 4 | 5 | 6 | 7 | 8 | 9 | 10 | 11 | 12 | 13 | 14 | 15 | 16 | 17 | 18 | 19 | 20 | 21 | 22 | 23 | 24 | 25 | 26 | 27 | 28 | 29 | 30 | 31 | 32 | 33 | 34 |
|---|---|---|---|---|---|---|---|---|---|---|---|---|---|---|---|---|---|---|---|---|---|---|---|---|---|---|---|---|---|---|---|---|---|---|
| Ground | H | A | H | A | H | A | A | H | A | H | H | A | A | H | A | H | A | H | A | H | H | A | A | H | A | H | H | A | H | A | H | A | H | A |
| Result | W | W | W | W | W | W | W | L | W | W | W | W | W | W | W | W | W | W | L | W | W | L | W | W | W | W | W | W | W | W | W | W | W | L |
| Position | 6 | 5 | 1 | 2 | 1 | 1 | 1 | 1 | 1 | 1 | 1 | 1 | 1 | 1 | 1 | 1 | 1 | 1 | 1 | 1 | 1 | 1 | 1 | 1 | 1 | 1 | 1 | 1 | 1 | 1 | 1 | 1 | 1 | 1 |

Last updated: May 25, 2018.
Source: Competitive matches
Ground: A = Away; H = Home; R = Rest. Result: L = Loss; W = Win; R = Rest; P = Postponed.

==== Matches ====
Win Loss

| 1 October 2017 1 | Real Madrid | 94–88 | MoraBanc Andorra | Madrid |
| 18:30 (CEST) | Scoring by quarter: 26–18, 24–17, 13–25, 31–28 |
| | Pts: Causeur 19; Rebs: Ayón 7 Asts: Campazzo, Dončić 4 PIR: Causeur 28 | Boxscore | Pts: Blažič 20; Rebs: Janković 5 Asts: Jaime Fernández 6 PIR: Walker 16 | Arena: WiZink Center; Attendance: 7,853; Referees: Jiménez Trujillo, Castillo, Mas Cagide |

| 5 October 2017 2 | RETAbet Bilbao Basket | 80–87 | Real Madrid | Bilbao |
| 19:30 (CEST) | Scoring by quarter: 28-20, 17-23, 17-17, 18-27 |
| | Pts: Todorović 15; Rebs: Hervelle, Gladness 6 Asts: Tabu 11; PIR: Hervelle 17 | Boxscore | Pts: Randolph 26; Rebs: Randolph 9 Asts: Campazzo 5 PIR: Randolph 30 | Arena: Bilbao Arena; Attendance: 8,511; Referees: Juan de Dios Oyón, Pedro Munar |

| 8 October 2017 3 | Real Madrid | 93–65 | Tecnyconta Zaragoza | Madrid |
| 12:30 (CEST) | Scoring by quarter: 26–13, 20–20, 15-16, 32-16 |
| | Pts: Causeur 15; Rebs: Ayón 9 Asts: Dončić 6 PIR: Causeur 19 | Boxscore | Pts: Suárez, Neal 12; Rebs: Suárez 6 Asts: García 5 PIR: Suárez 13 | Arena: WiZink Center; Attendance: 9,028; Referees: Calatrava, Francisco J. Araña, Esperanza Mendoza |

| 15 October 2017 4 | Valencia | 82–86 | Real Madrid | Valencia |
| 18:30 (CEST) | Scoring by quarter: 18-17, 21-26, 23-18, 20-25 |
| | Pts: Thomas, Pleiß 15; Rebs: Pleiß 8 Asts: Vives 5 PIR: Pleiß 22 | Boxscore | Pts: Randolph 18; Rebs: Dončić 7 Asts: Dončić 10; PIR: Dončić 25 | Arena: Font de San Lluís; Attendance: 8,500; Referees: J.C García González, Sergio Manuel, Sanchez Mohedas |

| 22 October 2017 5 | Real Madrid | 99–85 | Unicaja | Madrid |
| 18:00 (CEST) | Scoring by quarter: 26-20, 19-20, 31-16, 23-29 |
| | Pts: Carroll 29; Rebs: Dončić, Reyes, Ayón 6 Asts: Dončić, Campazzo, Ayón 5 PIR: Carroll 27 | Boxscore | Pts: McCallum Jr. 15; Rebs: Shermadini, Brooks 5 Asts: McCallum Jr., Nedović 4 PIR: McCallum Jr. 20 | Arena: WiZink Center; Attendance: 8,540; Referees: Antonio Conde, Vicente Bultó, Raúl Zamorano |

| 28 October 2017 6 | San Pablo Burgos | 95–100 | Real Madrid | Burgos |
| 20:00 (CEST) | Scoring by quarter: 17-18, 28-21, 28-29, 22-32 |
| | Pts: Thompson 20; Rebs: Gailius 6 Asts: Schreiner 7 PIR: Thompson 19 | Boxscore | Pts: Campazzo 17; Rebs: Mačiulis, Ayón 6 Asts: Campazzo 4 PIR: Campazzo 24 | Arena: Coliseum Burgos; Attendance: 9,234; Referees: J.A. Martín Bertrán, Rafael Serrano, A. Sánchez Sixto |

| 4 November 2017 7 | Iberostar Tenerife | 74–84 | Real Madrid | San Cristóbal de La Laguna |
| 20:00 (CEST) | Scoring by quarter: 23-18, 19-24, 14-18, 18-24 |
| | Pts: Tobey, Abromaitis 12; Rebs: Tobey, Allen 6 Asts: Tobey 3 PIR: Tobey 14 | Boxscore | Pts: Reyes 18; Rebs: Reyes 7 Asts: Campazzo 8 PIR: Reyes 26 | Arena: Santiago Martín; Attendance: 5,159; Referees: Miguel Angel Pérez Pérez, Calatrava, Arnau Padrós |

| 12 November 2017 8 | Real Madrid | 80–84 | FC Barcelona Lassa | Madrid |
| 19:30 (CEST) | Scoring by quarter: 19-18, 26-27, 16-16, 19-23 |
| | Pts: Dončić 20; Rebs: Dončić 10; Asts: Campazzo 3 PIR: Dončić, Reyes 19 | Boxscore | Pts: Moerman 19; Rebs: Tomić 6 Asts: Heurtel 4 PIR: Moerman 22 | Arena: WiZink Center; Attendance: 12,114; Referees: E. Pérez Pizarro, Oscar Perea, Martín Caballero |

| 18 November 2017 9 | Real Betis Energía Plus | 63–98 | Real Madrid | Seville |
| 20:00 (CEST) | Scoring by quarter: 18-29, 18-24, 14-25, 13-20 |
| | Pts: Kelly 14; Rebs: Anosike 10; Asts: Draper 4 PIR: Anosike 21 | Boxscore | Pts: Dončić, Thompkins 13; Rebs: Tavares 15; Asts: Dončić 8 PIR: Dončić 24 | Arena: Palacio Municipal de Deportes San Pablo; Attendance: 5,200; Referees: Carlos Peruga, Francisco J. Araña, Antonio Sacristán |

| 3 December 2017 10 | Real Madrid | 96–72 | Herbalife Gran Canaria | Madrid |
| 18:30 (CEST) | Scoring by quarter: 23-17, 30-19, 18-17, 25-19 |
| | Pts: Dončić 16; Rebs: Thompkins 6 Asts: Causeur 6 PIR: Dončić 21 | Boxscore | Pts: Eriksson 12; Rebs: Balvín 10; Asts: McKissic 5 PIR: Eriksson 12 | Arena: WiZink Center; Attendance: 8,727; Referees: M.A. Pérez Pérez, Sergio Manuel, C Sánchez Monserrat |

| 10 December 2017 11 | Real Madrid | 87–85(OT) | UCAM Murcia | Madrid |
| 12:30 (CEST) | Scoring by quarter: 16-22, 21-19, 12-13, 25-20, Overtime: 13-11 |
| | Pts: Carroll 17; Rebs: Reyes 8 Asts: Dončić 4 PIR: Dončić 22 | Boxscore | Pts: Kloof 19; Rebs: Rojas 9 Asts: Hannah 5 PIR: Hannah 17 | Arena: WiZink Center; Attendance: 8,016; Referees: J.C García González, Juan de Dios Oyón, Javier Torres |

| 17 December 2017 12 | Monbus Obradoiro | 93–102 | Real Madrid | Santiago de Compostela |
| 18:30 (CEST) | Scoring by quarter: 21-18, 16-34, 30-24, 26-26 |
| | Pts: Benjamin Simons 21; Rebs: Bendžius 8 Asts: Pepe Pozas 8 PIR: Bendžius 20 | Boxscore | Pts: Carroll 18; Rebs: Reyes 9 Asts: Campazzo 6 PIR: Reyes 24 | Arena: Pavillón Multiusos Fontes do Sar; Attendance: 5,705; Referees: Antonio Conde, Calatrava, Jorge Martínez |

| 31 December 2017 14 | Real Madrid | 96–89 | Movistar Estudiantes | Madrid |
| 12:30 (CEST) | Scoring by quarter: 19-16, 27-23, 22-24, 28-26 |
| | Pts: Dončić 24; Rebs: Reyes 10; Asts: Dončić, Campazzo 5 PIR: Dončić 33 | Boxscore | Pts: Landesberg 29; Rebs: Vicedo, Brown 6 Asts: Cook 8 PIR: Landesberg | Arena: WiZink Center; Attendance: 10,387; Referees: Jiménez Trujillo, Jordi Aliaga, Alfonso Olivares |

| 3 January 2018 13 | Kirolbet Baskonia | 69–81 | Real Madrid | Vitoria-Gasteiz |
| 20:00 (CEST) | Scoring by quarter: 18-18, 18-15, 19-24, 14-24 |
| | Pts: Huertas, Shengelia 15; Rebs: Shengelia 10; Asts: Granger 5 PIR: Shengelia 17 | Boxscore | Pts: Causeur 15; Rebs: Thompkins 7 Asts: Dončić 7 PIR: Dončić 20 | Arena: Fernando Buesa Arena; Attendance: 14,178; Referees: Carlos Peruga, Vicente Bultó, Martín Caballero |

| 7 January 2018 15 | Divina Seguros Joventut | 66–84 | Real Madrid | Badalona |
| 18:30 (CEST) | Scoring by quarter: 6-26, 20-13, 17-29, 23-16 |
| | Pts: Wayns 22; Rebs: Jordan 6 Asts: Vidal 3 PIR: Wayns 25 | Boxscore | Pts: Yusta 18; Rebs: Thompkins 9 Asts: Campazzo 5 PIR: Yusta 21 | Arena: Palau Municipal d'Esports de Badalona; Attendance: 8,597; Referees: Daniel Hierrezuelo, Francisco J. Araña, Raúl Zamorano |

| 14 January 2018 16 | Real Madrid | 100–72 | Montakit Fuenlabrada | Madrid |
| 18:30 (CEST) | Scoring by quarter: 24-17, 21-19, 25-20, 30-16 |
| | Pts: Tavares 15; Rebs: Tavares 13; Asts: Dončić 6 PIR: Tavares 27 | Boxscore | Pts: Popović 18; Rebs: four players 5 Asts: Popović, Eyenga 5 PIR: Popović, Eyenga 13 | Arena: WiZink Center; Attendance: 9,773; Referees: Antonio Conde, J.R. García Ortiz, Arnau Padrós |

| 21 January 2018 17 | Gipuzkoa Basket | 84–98 | Real Madrid | San Sebastián |
| 18:00 (CEST) | Scoring by quarter: 24-21, 15-26, 25-32, 20-19 |
| | Pts: Norel 22; Rebs: Norel 10; Asts: Kenny Chery 5 PIR: Norel 22 | Boxscore | Pts: Carroll 28; Rebs: Tavares 7 Asts: Campazzo 5 PIR: Carroll 26 | Arena: Plaza de Toros de Illumbe; Attendance: 5,118; Referees: Oscar Perea, Juan de Dios Oyón, A. Sánchez Sixto |

| 28 January 2018 18 | Real Madrid | 95–65 | RETAbet Bilbao Basket | Madrid |
| 12:30 (CEST) | Scoring by quarter: 19-21, 29-13, 25-13, 22-18 |
| | Pts: Carroll 16; Rebs: Tavares 11; Asts: Campazzo 4 PIR: Tavares 26 | Boxscore | Pts: Mumbrú, Todorović 17; Rebs: Pere Tomàs, Todorović 4 Asts: Mumbrú 3 PIR: Todorović 22 | Arena: WiZink Center; Attendance: 9,168; Referees: J.A. Martín Bertrán, Martín Caballero, Antonio Sacristán |

| 3 February 2018 19 | MoraBanc Andorra | 89–87 | Real Madrid | Andorra la Vella |
| 19:00 (CEST) | Scoring by quarter: 19-28, 32-27, 16-17, 22-15 |
| | Pts: Sané 24; Rebs: Diagne 7 Asts: Albicy 10; PIR: Sané 30 | Boxscore | Pts: Campazzo 19; Rebs: Thompkins 7 Asts: Campazzo 8 PIR: Campazzo 32 | Arena: Poliesportiu d'Andorra; Attendance: 5,000; Referees: J.C García González, Rafael Serrano, Esperanza Mendoza |

| 11 February 2018 20 | Real Madrid | 89–76 | Iberostar Tenerife | Madrid |
| 18:30 (CEST) | Scoring by quarter: 18-21, 25-13, 25-19, 21-23 |
| | Pts: Campazzo 15; Rebs: Randolph 11; Asts: Campazzo 8 PIR: Campazzo 24 | Boxscore | Pts: Abromaitis 21; Rebs: Beirán 7 Asts: Beirán 6 PIR: Abromaitis 34 | Arena: WiZink Center; Attendance: 8,794; Referees: E. Pérez Pizarro, Jordi Aliaga, Sanchez Mohedas |

| 4 March 2018 21 | Real Madrid | 96–81 | San Pablo Burgos | Madrid |
| 12:30 (CEST) | Scoring by quarter: 28-13, 25-18, 21-28, 28-28 |
| | Pts: Carroll 18; Rebs: Tavares 13; Asts: Dončić 5 PIR: Tavares 26 | Boxscore | Pts: Álex López 16; Rebs: Huskić 9 Asts: Álex López 5 PIR: Álex López 25 | Arena: WiZink Center; Attendance: 8,604; Referees: J.A. Martín Bertrán, Martín Caballero, Pedro Munar |

| 11 March 2018 22 | FC Barcelona Lassa | 94–72 | Real Madrid | Barcelona |
| 18:30 (CEST) | Scoring by quarter: 21-14, 24-15, 27-17, 22-26 |
| | Pts: Heurtel 21; Rebs: Moerman 7 Asts: Ribas, Claver 5 PIR: Heurtel 22 | Boxscore | Pts: Fernández 11; Rebs: Randolph 6 Asts: Randle 4 PIR: Fernández 14 | Arena: Palau Blaugrana; Attendance: 5,687; Referees: Jiménez Trujillo, Sergio Manuel, Jacobo Rial Barreiro |

| 17 March 2018 23 | Tecnyconta Zaragoza | 81–96 | Real Madrid | Zaragoza |
| 20:30 (CEST) | Scoring by quarter: 12-22, 15-31, 27-19, 27-24 |
| | Pts: Dragović 21; Rebs: Juan Triguero, Dragović 7 Asts: Three players 3 PIR: Dragović 27 | Boxscore | Pts: Campazzo 19; Rebs: Tavares 7 Asts: Campazzo 7 PIR: Campazzo 27 | Arena: Príncipe Felipe; Attendance: 9,489; Referees: Oscar Perea, Juan de Dios Oyón, Jorge Martínez |

| 25 March 2018 24 | Real Madrid | 83–71 | Valencia | Madrid |
| 18:30 (CEST) | Scoring by quarter: 17-18, 21-27, 27-12, 18-14 |
| | Pts: Randolph, Tavares 13; Rebs: Randolph 7 Asts: Campazzo 7 PIR: Tavares 23 | Boxscore | Pts: Thomas 12; Rebs: Pleiß 6 Asts: Vives 5 PIR: Thomas 13 | Arena: WiZink Center; Attendance: 9,812; Referees: M.A. Pérez Pérez, Jordi Aliaga, Andrés Fernández |

| 1 April 2018 25 | Unicaja | 88–89 | Real Madrid | Málaga |
| 18:30 (CEST) | Scoring by quarter: 17-21, 31-26, 17-22, 23-20 |
| | Pts: Nedović 25; Rebs: Augustine 6 Asts: McCallum Jr. 4 PIR: Nedović 24 | Boxscore | Pts: Causeur 21; Rebs: Tavares 8 Asts: Dončić 9 PIR: Causeur 22 | Arena: José María Martín Carpena; Attendance: 9,863; Referees: Antonio Conde, Francisco J. Araña, Arnau Padrós |

| 8 April 2018 26 | Real Madrid | 78–65 | Monbus Obradoiro | Madrid |
| 12:30 (CEST) | Scoring by quarter: 19–18, 21–14, 21–10, 16–23 |
| | Pts: Dončić 23; Rebs: Ayón 7 Asts: Dončić 7 PIR: Carroll 5 | Boxscore | Pts: Bendzius 14; Rebs: Llovet 7 Asts: Thomas 4 PIR: Pustovyi 4 | Arena: WiZink Center; Attendance: 7,228; Referees: Daniel Hierrezuelo, Rial, Esperanza Mendoza |

| 12 April 2018 27 | Real Madrid | 87–70 | Divina Seguros Joventut | Madrid |
| 20:45 (CEST) | Scoring by quarter: 22-18, 24-14, 24-19, 17-19 |
| | Pts: Carroll 16; Rebs: Dončić 8 Asts: Dončić 10; PIR: Carroll 18 | Boxscore | Pts: Richard 13; Rebs: Birgander 10; Asts: three players 2 PIR: Birgander 11 | Arena: WiZink Center; Attendance: 5,879; Referees: M.A. Pérez Pérez, Jorge Martínez, Pedro Munar |

| 14 April 2018 28 | Montakit Fuenlabrada | 75–90 | Real Madrid | Fuenlabrada |
| 20:30 (CEST) | Scoring by quarter: 22-23, 13-17, 13-30, 27-20 |
| | Pts: Eyenga 17; Rebs: O'Leary 9 Asts: Cruz 5 PIR: Eyenga 12 | Boxscore | Pts: Dončić 17; Rebs: Ayón 9 Asts: Dončić 5 PIR: Dončić 26 | Arena: Fernando Martín; Attendance: 5,356; Referees: Jiménez Trujillo, Fernando Calatrava, Sánchez Monserrat |

| 29 April 2018 30 | Movistar Estudiantes | 75–92 | Real Madrid | Madrid |
| 18:30 (CEST) | Scoring by quarter: 16-21, 15-23, 20-30, 24-18 |
| | Pts: Landesberg 13; Rebs: Suton 9 Asts: Landesberg 4 PIR: Landesberg 13 | Boxscore | Pts: Three players 14; Rebs: Tavares 13; Asts: Thompkins 5 PIR: Tavares 29 | Arena: WiZink Center; Attendance: 13,513; Referees: J.A. Martín Bertrán, J.R. García Ortiz, Alfonso Olivares |

| 3 May 2018 29 | Real Madrid | 101–89 | Kirolbet Baskonia | Madrid |
| 18:00 (CEST) | Scoring by quarter: 25-24, 27-20, 23-18, 26-27 |
| | Pts: Thompkins 17; Rebs: Reyes, Tavares 5 Asts: Fernández 6 PIR: Fernández 28 | Boxscore | Pts: Vildoza 22; Rebs: Poirier 6 Asts: Vildoza, Huertas 4 PIR: Vildoza 29 | Arena: WiZink Center; Attendance: 5,781; Referees: Antonio Conde, Oscar Perea, Martín Caballero |

| 6 May 2018 31 | Real Madrid | 87–75 | Gipuzkoa Basket | Madrid |
| 12:30 (CEST) | Scoring by quarter: 12-22, 31-11, 31-20, 13-22 |
| | Pts: Tavares 19; Rebs: Yusta 6 Asts: Sergio Llull 4 PIR: Tavares 24 | Boxscore | Pts: Kenny Chery 24; Rebs: Clark 8 Asts: Dani Pérez 5 PIR: Kenny Chery, Clark 13 | Arena: WiZink Center; Attendance: 6,327; Referees: Daniel Hierrezuelo, Vicente Bultó, Antonio Sacristán |

| 9 May 2018 33 | Real Madrid | 104–89 | Real Betis Energía Plus | Madrid |
| 20:45 (CEST) | Scoring by quarter: 21-22, 28-23, 29-21, 26-23 |
| | Pts: Dončić 17; Rebs: Dončić 10; Asts: Dončić 10; PIR: Dončić 42 | Boxscore | Pts: Booker 15; Rebs: Anosike 14; Asts: Three players 4 PIR: Anosike 23 | Arena: WiZink Center; Attendance: 4,108; Referees: Carlos Cortés, Juan de Dios Oyón, Mas Cagide |

| 12 May 2018 32 | UCAM Murcia | 61–63 | Real Madrid | Murcia |
| 19:00 (CEST) | Scoring by quarter: 12-18, 13-13, 18-16, 18-16 |
| | Pts: Benite 20; Rebs: Benite 6 Asts: Oleson 4 PIR: Rojas 17 | Boxscore | Pts: Tavares 12; Rebs: Tavares 6 Asts: Dončić 4 PIR: Tavares 24 | Arena: Palacio de Deportes; Attendance: 7,098; Referees: Carlos Peruga, Sergio Manuel, Raúl Zamorano |

| 24 May 2018 34 | Herbalife Gran Canaria | 88–78 | Real Madrid | Las Palmas |
| 20:30 (CEST) | Scoring by quarter: 27-25, 14-22, 26-15, 21-16 |
| | Pts: Eriksson 18; Rebs: Balvín 10; Asts: Mekel, Radičević 6 PIR: Aguilar 22 | Boxscore | Pts: Carroll 18; Rebs: Three players 4 Asts: Randle 4 PIR: Carroll 14 | Arena: Gran Canaria Arena; Attendance: 6,498; Referees: Miguel Angel Pérez Pérez, Luis Miguel Castillo, Martín Caballero |

==== Results overview ====
Win Loss

| Opposition | Home score | Away score | Double |
|---|---|---|---|
| Divina Seguros Joventut | 87-70 | 66-84 | 171-136 |
| FC Barcelona Lassa | 80-84 | 94-72 | 152-178 |
| Gipuzkoa Basket | 87-75 | 84-98 | 185-159 |
| Herbalife Gran Canaria | 96-72 | 88-78 | 174-160 |
| Iberostar Tenerife | 89-76 | 74-84 | 173-150 |
| Rio Natura Monbus Obradoiro | 78-65 | 93-102 | 180-158 |
| Montakit Fuenlabrada | 100-72 | 75-90 | 190-147 |
| MoraBanc Andorra | 94-88 | 89-87 | 181-177 |
| Movistar Estudiantes | 96-89 | 75-92 | 188-164 |
| Kirolbet Baskonia | 101-89 | 69-81 | 170-158 |
| Real Betis Energía Plus | 104-89 | 63-98 | 202-152 |
| RETAbet Bilbao Basket | 95-65 | 80-87 | 175-152 |
| San Pablo Burgos | 96-81 | 95-100 | 196-176 |
| Tecnyconta Zaragoza | 93-65 | 81-96 | 189-146 |
| UCAM Murcia | 87-85 | 61-63 | 150-146 |
| Unicaja | 99-85 | 88-89 | 188-173 |
| Valencia Basket | 83-71 | 82-86 | 169-153 |

=== ACB Playoffs ===
Win Loss

==== Quarterfinals ====
| 27 May 2018 1 | Real Madrid | 83–73 | Iberostar Tenerife | Madrid |
| 12:30 (CEST) | Scoring by quarter: 21-15, 21-18, 16-15, 25-25 |
| | Pts: Carroll 15; Rebs: Randolph 11; Asts: Llull 4 PIR: Reyes 18 | Boxscore | Pts: Tobey 21; Rebs: Tobey 8 Asts: Bassas 6 PIR: Tobey 18 | Arena: WiZink Center; Attendance: 8,449; Referees: Daniel Hierrezuelo, Jordi Aliaga, Jorge Martínez |

| 29 May 2018 2 | Iberostar Tenerife | 75–84 | Real Madrid | San Cristóbal de La Laguna |
| 22:00 (CEST) | Scoring by quarter: 14-14, 18-30, 23-19, 20-21 |
| | Pts: Tobey 18; Rebs: Tobey 16; Asts: Three Players 4 PIR: Tobey 24 | Boxscore | Pts: Fernández 19; Rebs: Tavares 11; Asts: Llull 7 PIR: Tavares 26 | Arena: Santiago Martín; Attendance: 5,176; Referees: Antonio Conde, Vicente Bultó, Jacobo Rial |

==== Semifinals ====
| 3 June 2018 1 | Real Madrid | 88–70 | Herbalife Gran Canaria | Madrid |
| 18:30 (CEST) | Scoring by quarter: 14-22, 28-10, 20-17, 26-21 |
| | Pts: Tavares 17; Rebs: Reyes, Tavares 7 Asts: Dončić 7 PIR: Tavares 25 | Boxscore | Pts: Four players 10; Rebs: Aguilar 6 Asts: Oliver 7 PIR: Nikola Radičević, Aguilar 13 | Arena: WiZink Center; Attendance: 9,710; Referees: J.A. Martín Bertrán, E. Pérez Pizarro, Luis Miguel Castillo |

| 5 June 2018 2 | Real Madrid | 92–83 | Herbalife Gran Canaria | Madrid |
| 21:00 (CEST) | Scoring by quarter: 19-21, 33-29, 18-20, 22-13 |
| | Pts: Dončić 14; Rebs: Dončić, Ayón 7 Asts: Dončić 7 PIR: Dončić, Ayón 20 | Boxscore | Pts: Balvín 13; Rebs: Balvín 8 Asts: Mekel 7 PIR: Balvín 26 | Arena: WiZink Center; Attendance: 9,256; Referees: J.C García González, Carlos Peruga, Oscar Perea |

| 7 June 2018 3 | Herbalife Gran Canaria | 92–99 | Real Madrid | Las Palmas |
| 21:00 (CEST) | Scoring by quarter: 27-25, 23-25, 21-29, 21-20 |
| | Pts: Báez 17; Rebs: Aguilar 6 Asts: Mekel 7 PIR: Aguilar 23 | Boxscore | Pts: Fernández 21; Rebs: Fernández 5 Asts: Dončić 5 PIR: Fernández 24 | Arena: Gran Canaria Arena; Attendance: 6,419; Referees: Daniel Hierrezuelo, Carlos Cortés, Sergio Manuel |

==== Final ====
| 13 June 2018 1 | Real Madrid | 90–94 | Kirolbet Baskonia | Madrid |
| 21:00 (CEST) | Scoring by quarter: 17-19, 22-20, 19-28, 32-27 |
| | Pts: Carroll 20; Rebs: Ayón 7 Asts: Campazzo 5 PIR: Tavares 17 | Boxscore | Pts: Vildoza 16; Rebs: Johannes Voigtmann, Shengelia 7 Asts: Janning 6 PIR: Vildoza 18 | Arena: WiZink Center; Attendance: 11,067; Referees: E. Pérez Pizarro, Antonio Conde, Carlos Peruga |

| 15 June 2018 2 | Real Madrid | 98–91 | Kirolbet Baskonia | Madrid |
| 22:15 (CEST) | Scoring by quarter: 28-33, 24-19, 31-13, 15-26 |
| | Pts: Carroll, Thompkins 16; Rebs: Ayón 10; Asts: Campazzo 4 PIR: Ayón 21 | Boxscore | Pts: Janning 18; Rebs: Poirier 6 Asts: Granger 5 PIR: Diop 19 | Arena: WiZink Center; Attendance: 11,208; Referees: Daniel Hierrezuelo, Jiménez Trujillo, Oscar Perea |

| 17 June 2018 3 | Kirolbet Baskonia | 78–83 | Real Madrid | Vitoria-Gasteiz |
| 18:30 (CEST) | Scoring by quarter: 24-20, 18-20, 21-25, 15-18 |
| | Pts: Beaubois 17; Rebs: Poirier, Shengelia 7 Asts: Vildoza 6 PIR: Vildoza, Poirier 14 | Boxscore | Pts: Dončić 20; Rebs: Dončić 9 Asts: Llull 5 PIR: Dončić 29 | Arena: Fernando Buesa Arena; Attendance: 15,512; Referees: J.A. Martín Bertrán, M.A. Pérez Pérez, Carlos Cortés |

| 19 June 2018 4 | Kirolbet Baskonia | 85–96 | Real Madrid | Vitoria-Gasteiz |
| 21:00 (CEST) | Scoring by quarter: 21-18, 17-24, 19-23, 28-31 |
| | Pts: Beaubois 19; Rebs: Poirier 4 Asts: Huertas 5 PIR: Beaubois 20 | Boxscore | Pts: Fernández 27; Rebs: Dončić 8 Asts: Campazzo 7 PIR: Fernández 33 | Arena: Fernando Buesa Arena; Attendance: 14,488; Referees: E. Pérez Pizarro, Antonio Conde, Jiménez Trujillo |

=== EuroLeague ===
==== League table ====
| Pos | Team | Pld | W | L | PF | PA | PD | Qualification |
|---|---|---|---|---|---|---|---|---|
| 3 | (Greece) Olympiacos | 30 | 19 | 11 | 2268 | 2250 | +18 | Advance to Playoffs |
| 4 | (Greece) Panathinaikos Superfoods | 30 | 19 | 11 | 2334 | 2291 | +43 | Advance to Playoffs |
| 5 | (Spain) Real Madrid | 30 | 19 | 11 | 2576 | 2375 | +201 | Advance to Playoffs |
| 6 | (Lithuania) Žalgiris | 30 | 18 | 12 | 2417 | 2389 | +28 | Advance to Playoffs |
| 7 | (Spain) Kirolbet Baskonia | 30 | 16 | 14 | 2487 | 2373 | +114 | Advance to Playoffs |

Source: EuroLeague
Rules for classification: All points scored in extra period(s) will not be counted in the standings, nor for any tie-break situation.

==== Results summary ====
| Overall | | | | | | Home | | | | | Away | | | | |
| Pld | W | L | PF | PA | PD | W | L | PF | PA | PD | W | L | PF | PA | PD |
|---|---|---|---|---|---|---|---|---|---|---|---|---|---|---|---|
| 30 | 19 | 11 | 2576 | 2385 | +191 | 11 | 4 | 1315 | 1176 | +139 | 8 | 7 | 1261 | 1209 | +52 |

Last updated: April 7, 2018.
Source: Competitive matches All points scored in extra period(s) will not be counted in the standings, nor for any tie-break situation.

==== Results by round ====
| Round | 1 | 2 | 3 | 4 | 5 | 6 | 7 | 8 | 9 | 10 | 11 | 12 | 13 | 14 | 15 | 16 | 17 | 18 | 19 | 20 | 21 | 22 | 23 | 24 | 25 | 26 | 27 | 28 | 29 | 30 |
|---|---|---|---|---|---|---|---|---|---|---|---|---|---|---|---|---|---|---|---|---|---|---|---|---|---|---|---|---|---|---|
| Ground | A | H | H | A | H | A | A | H | A | H | A | H | H | A | A | H | A | H | A | H | A | H | A | H | H | A | A | H | A | H |
| Result | W | W | W | W | L | L | L | W | L | L | L | W | W | W | W | W | W | W | L | W | L | L | W | L | W | W | L | W | W | W |
| Position | 3 | 1 | 1 | 1 | 1 | 3 | 6 | 3 | 5 | 7 | 8 | 8 | 7 | 6 | 6 | 4 | 4 | 3 | 4 | 3 | 4 | 5 | 4 | 5 | 4 | 4 | 4 | 4 | 4 | 5 |

Last updated: April 7, 2018.
Source: Competitive matches
Ground: A = Away; H = Home; R = Rest. Result: L = Loss; W = Win; R = Rest; P = Postponed.

==== Matches ====
Win Loss

| 12 October 2017 1 | Anadolu Efes (Turkey) | 74–88 | (Spain) Real Madrid | Istanbul |
| 19:00 (CEST) | Scoring by quarter: 19–28, 17-17, 20-17, 18-26 |
| | Pts: McCollum 26; Rebs: Ledo 9 Asts: Simon 3 PIR: McCollum 30 | Boxscore | Pts: Dončić 27; Rebs: Ayón 10; Asts: Dončić, Ayón 6 PIR: Dončić 30 | Arena: Sinan Erdem Dome; Attendance: 6,788; Referees: Robert Lottermosser (GER), Carmelo Paternicò (ITA), Ioannis Foufis (GRE) |

| 19 October 2017 2 | Real Madrid (Spain) | 82–69 | (Russia) CSKA Moscow | Madrid |
| 20:45 (CEST) | Scoring by quarter: 20-15, 25-18, 11-20, 26-16 |
| | Pts: Dončić 14; Rebs: Ayón 11; Asts: Taylor 4 PIR: Dončić 21 | Boxscore | Pts: Clyburn 15; Rebs: Clyburn 9 Asts: de Colo 3 PIR: Clyburn 19 | Arena: WiZink Center; Attendance: 11,077; Referees: Luigi Lamonica (ITA), Borys Ryzhyk (UKR), Emin Mogulkoc (TUR) |

| 24 October 2017 3 | Real Madrid (Spain) | 100–90 | (Italy) AX Armani Exchange Olimpia Milan | Madrid |
| 21:00 (CEST) | Scoring by quarter: 30-28, 24-26, 27-20, 19-16 |
| | Pts: Dončić 27; Rebs: Dončić 8 Asts: Campazzo, Ayón 6 PIR: Dončić 41 | Boxscore | Pts: Goudelock, Gudaitis 20; Rebs: Gudaitis 7 Asts: Theodore 5 PIR: Gudaitis 28 | Arena: WiZink Center; Attendance: 8,067; Referees: Damir Javor (SLO), Petri Mantyla (FIN), Marcin Kowalski (POL) |

| 26 October 2017 4 | Žalgiris (Lithuania) | 66–87 | (Spain) Real Madrid | Kaunas |
| 20:00 (CEST) | Scoring by quarter: 16-28, 15-22, 19-23, 16-24 |
| | Pts: Pangos 20; Rebs: Jankūnas, Ulanovas 4 Asts: Pangos 5 PIR: Pangos 25 | Boxscore | Pts: Dončić 28; Rebs: Dončić 9 Asts: Campazzo 6 PIR: Dončić 35 | Arena: Žalgiris Arena; Attendance: 13,148; Referees: Matej Boltauzer (SLO), Jakub Zamojski (POL), Spiros Gkontas (GRE) |

| 2 November 2017 5 | Real Madrid (Spain) | 80–86 | (Russia) Khimki | Madrid |
| 22:00 (CEST) | Scoring by quarter: 23-25, 16-20, 20-21, 21-20 |
| | Pts: Dončić 12; Rebs: Ayón 10; Asts: Causeur 5 PIR: Dončić 18 | Boxscore | Pts: Shved 20; Rebs: Thomas 6 Asts: Marković 8 PIR: Shved 21 | Arena: WiZink Center; Attendance: 9,482; Referees: Christos Christodoulou (GRE), Robert Lottermoser (GER), Piotr Pastusiak (POL) |

| 9 November 2017 6 | Maccabi FOX Tel Aviv (Israel) | 90–83 | (Spain) Real Madrid | Tel Aviv |
| 20:05 (CEST) | Scoring by quarter: 22-30, 25-12, 17-24, 26-17 |
| | Pts: Thomas 21; Rebs: Tyus, Bolden 7 Asts: Cole 5 PIR: Tyus 21 | [ Boxscore] | Pts: Dončić 19; Rebs: Randolph 9 Asts: Dončić 6 PIR: Dončić 30 | Arena: Menora Mivtachim Arena; Attendance: 11,060; Referees: Sasa Pukl (SLO), Elias Kormilas (GRE), Carmelo Paternico |

| 14 November 2017 7 | Baskonia (Spain) | 105–75 | (Spain) Real Madrid | Vitoria-Gasteiz |
| 21:30 (CET) | Scoring by quarter: 36-17, 28-27, 24-19, 17-12 |
| | Pts: Beaubois 15; Rebs: Poirier 8 Asts: Huertas 6 PIR: Huertas 20 | Boxscore | Pts: Dončić 18; Rebs: Tavares 7 Asts: Randolph 4 PIR: Dončić 19 | Arena: Fernando Buesa Arena; Attendance: 10,639; Referees: Fernando Rocha (POR), Spiros Gkontas (GRE), Josip Radojkvic (CRO) |

| 16 November 2017 8 | Real Madrid (Spain) | 89–57 | (Spain) Unicaja | Madrid |
| 21:00 (CEST) | Scoring by quarter: 19-12, 21-15, 22-11, 27-19 |
| | Pts: Carroll 17; Rebs: Dončić 10; Asts: Dončić 6 PIR: Dončić 28 | Boxscore | Pts: A. Díaz, Milosavljević 10; Rebs: D. Díez, Milosavljević 6 Asts: Morayo Soluade 4 PIR: Milosavljević 13 | Arena: WiZink Center; Attendance: 8,260; Referees: Sreten Radovic (CRO), Sergio Silva (POR), Moritz Reiter (GER) |

| 24 November 2017 9 | Panathinaikos Superfoods (Greece) | 82–80 | (Spain) Real Madrid | Athens |
| 20:00 (CET) | Scoring by quarter: 23-28, 17-26, 24-15, 18-11 |
| | Pts: Rivers 20; Rebs: Gist 7 Asts: Calathes 8 PIR: Gist 18 | Boxscore | Pts: Dončić 19; Rebs: Reyes 8 Asts: Fernández 4 PIR: Fernández 19 | Arena: Olympic Sports Center Athens; Attendance: 18,310; Referees: Luigi Lamonica (ITA), Olegs Latisevs (LAT), Milan Nedovic (SLO) |

| 1 December 2017 10 | Real Madrid (Spain) | 83–87 | (Serbia) Crvena zvezda mts | Madrid |
| 21:00 (CET) | Scoring by quarter: 24-19, 15-27, 19-21, 25-20 |
| | Pts: Dončić 20; Rebs: Reyes 8 Asts: Fernández, Dončić 5 PIR: Dončić 32 | Boxscore | Pts: Rochestie 18; Rebs: Bjelica 6 Asts: Rochestie 7 PIR: Rochestie 18 | Arena: WiZink Center; Attendance: 9,239; Referees: Christos Christodoulou (GRE), Robert Lottemoser (GER), Piotr Pastusiak (POL) |

| 8 December 2017 11 | Olympiacos (Greece) | 92–83(OT) | (Spain) Real Madrid | Piraeus |
| 20:00 (CET) | Scoring by quarter: 18-8, 16-22, 22-17, 16-25, Overtime: 20-11 |
| | Pts: Printezis 21; Rebs: Papanikolaou 8 Asts: Spanoulis 4 PIR: Printezis 27 | Boxscore | Pts: Dončić 33; Rebs: Thompkins 10; Asts: Dončić 4 PIR: Dončić 36 | Arena: Peace and Friendship Stadium; Attendance: 10,500; Referees: Sasa Pukl (SLO), Ilija Belosevic (SRB), Emin Mogulkoc (TUR) |

| 14 December 2017 12 | Real Madrid (Spain) | 87–75 | (Spain) FC Barcelona Lassa | Madrid |
| 20:45 (CET) | Scoring by quarter: 15-15, 25-23, 28-14, 19-23 |
| | Pts: Dončić 16; Rebs: Reyes 8 Asts: Thompkins 4 PIR: Dončić 26 | Boxscore | Pts: Tomić 12; Rebs: Hanga 7 Asts: Navarro, Heurtel 3 PIR: Tomić 17 | Arena: WiZink Center; Attendance: 10,516; Referees: Sreten Radovic (CRO), Carmelo Paternico (ITA), Sergio Silva (POR) |

| 19 December 2017 13 | Real Madrid (Spain) | 91–72 | (Spain) Valencia Basket | Madrid |
| 20:45 (CET) | Scoring by quarter: 24-18, 19-23, 21-17, 27-14 |
| | Pts: Campazzo 14; Rebs: Thompkins 11; Asts: Campazzo 8 PIR: Campazzo 23 | Boxscore | Pts: Dubljević 18; Rebs: San Emeterio, Doornekamp 4 Asts: Van Rossom 4 PIR: Dubljević 18 | Arena: WiZink Center; Attendance: 9,098; Referees: Damir Javor (SLO), Tomislav Hordox (CRO), Renaud Geller (BEK) |

| 21 December 2017 14 | Brose Bamberg (Germany) | 66–81 | (Spain) Real Madrid | Nuremberg |
| 20:00 (CET) | Scoring by quarter: 13-29, 22-21, 16-18, 15-13 |
| | Pts: Hackett 13; Rebs: Wright 8 Asts: Lô 4 PIR: Lô 14 | Boxscore | Pts: Thompkins 20; Rebs: Tavares 10; Asts: Dončić 8 PIR: Thompkins 22 | Arena: Arena Nürnberger Versicherung; Attendance: 6,150; Referees: Christos Christodoulou (GRE), Borys Ryzhyk (UKR), Rain Peerandi (EST) |

| 28 December 2017 15 | Fenerbahçe Doğuş (Turkey) | 77–79 | (Spain) Real Madrid | Istanbul |
| 18:45 (CET) | Scoring by quarter: 17-10, 19-27, 25-25, 16-17 |
| | Pts: Wanamaker 20; Rebs: Melli 7 Asts: Sloukas, Nunnally 3 PIR: Wanamaker 23 | [ Boxscore] | Pts: Dončić 20; Rebs: Dončić 8 Asts: Dončić 10; PIR: Dončić 37 | Arena: Fenerbahçe Ülker Sports Arena; Attendance: 12,918; Referees: Robert Lottermosr (GER), Elias Koromils (GRE), Carmelo Paternico (ITA) |

| 5 January 2018 16 | Real Madrid (Spain) | 93–81 | (Israel) Maccabi FOX Tel Aviv | Madrid |
| 20:45 (CET) | Scoring by quarter: 25-26, 23-24, 21-10, 24-21 |
| | Pts: Reyes 14; Rebs: Tavares 12; Asts: Causeur 6 PIR: Campazzo 21 | Boxscore | Pts: Jackson 29; Rebs: Parakhouski 8 Asts: Roll, Jackson 5 PIR: Jackson 32 | Arena: WiZink Center; Attendance: 9,462; Referees: Ilija Belosevic (SRB), Piotr Pastusiak (POL), Spiros Gkontas (GRE) |

| 12 January 2018 17 | Khimki (Russia) | 78–95 | (Spain) Real Madrid | Mytishchi |
| 18:00 (CET) | Scoring by quarter: 17-26, 14-25, 18-16, 29-28 |
| | Pts: Shved 23; Rebs: Thomas 9 Asts: Jenkins 5 PIR: Honeycutt 20 | Boxscore | Pts: Causeur, Tavares 11; Rebs: Tavares 8 Asts: Campazzo 7 PIR: Tavares 22 | Arena: Mytishchi Arena; Attendance: 6,314; Referees: Sreten Radovic (CRO), Emin Mogulkoc (TUR), Mehdi Difallah (FRA) |

| 17 January 2018 18 | Real Madrid (Spain) | 75–73 | (Spain) Saski Baskonia | Madrid |
| 20:45 (CET) | Scoring by quarter: 18-17, 16-17, 25-27, 16-12 |
| | Pts: Causeur, Thompkins 13; Rebs: Thompkins 7 Asts: Campazzo 4 PIR: Tavares, Thompkins 20 | Boxscore | Pts: Beaubois 18; Rebs: Shengelia 8 Asts: Granger 4 PIR: Three players 12 | Arena: WiZink Center; Attendance: 10,071; Referees: Robert Lottermoser (GER), Elias Koromilas (GRE), Arturas Sukys (LTU) |

| 19 January 2018 19 | Unicaja (Spain) | 80–75 | (Spain) Real Madrid | Málaga |
| 20:45 (CET) | Scoring by quarter: 20-15, 18-12, 19-25, 23-23 |
| | Pts: McCallum Jr., Waczyński 15; Rebs: Shermadini 7 Asts: Nedović 7 PIR: Waczyński 22 | Boxscore | Pts: Dončić 16; Rebs: Three players 5 Asts: Campazzo 5 PIR: Dončić 24 | Arena: Palacio de Deportes José María Martín Carpena; Attendance: 10,292; Referees: Luigi Lamonica (ITA), Olegs Latisevs (LTA), Seggi Shmmesh (ISR) |

| 25 January 2018 20 | Real Madrid (Spain) | 87–68 | (Turkey) Anadolu Efes | Madrid |
| 20:45 (CET) | Scoring by quarter: 20-14, 19-16, 21- 17, 27-21 |
| | Pts: Dončić 17; Rebs: Tavares 9 Asts: Fernández 8 PIR: Tavares 25 | Boxscore | Pts: Dragić 18; Rebs: Dragić 5 Asts: Simon 5 PIR: Dragić 21 | Arena: WiZink Center; Attendance: 8,417; Referees: Christos Christodoulou (GRE), Borys Ryzhyk (UKR), Aare Halliko (EST) |

| 1 February 2018 21 | CSKA Moscow (Russia) | 93–87 | (Spain) Real Madrid | Moscow |
| 18:00 (CET) | Scoring by quarter: 33-11, 21-20, 24-29, 15-27 |
| | Pts: Rodríguez 18; Rebs: Clyburn 10; Asts: de Colo, Rodríguez 5 PIR: Higgins 16 | Boxscore | Pts: Dončić 21; Rebs: Tavares 9 Asts: Dončić 5 PIR: Dončić 23 | Arena: Megasport Sport Palace; Attendance: 12,322; Referees: Sasa Pukl (SLO), Milivoje Jovcic (SRB), Carmelo Parernico |

| 9 February 2018 22 | Real Madrid (Spain) | 79–80 | (Greece) Olympiacos | Madrid |
| 20:45 (CEST) | Scoring by quarter: 20-21, 19-24, 23-20, 17-15 |
| | Pts: Dončić 27; Rebs: Thompkins, Taylor 5 Asts: Dončić, Campazzo 3 PIR: Dončić 33 | Boxscore | Pts: Printezis 21; Rebs: Milutinov 12; Asts: Strēlnieks 7 PIR: Printezis 29 | Arena: WiZink Center; Attendance: 11,594; Referees: Ilija Belosevic (SRB), Olegs Latisves (LAT), Anne Panther |

| 23 February 2018 23 | FC Barcelona Lassa (Spain) | 74–101 | (Spain) Real Madrid | Barcelona |
| 21:00 (CET) | Scoring by quarter: 13-30, 22-22, 22-31, 17-18 |
| | Pts: Heurtel, Vezenkov 11; Rebs: Moerman 5 Asts: Heurtel 6 PIR: Heurtel 16 | Boxscore | Pts: Carroll 18; Rebs: Ayón 8 Asts: Campazzo 9 PIR: Campazzo 24 | Arena: Palau Blaugrana; Attendance: 6,829; Referees: Robert Lottermoser (GER), Sreten Radovic (CRO), Milan Nedovic (SLO) |

| 2 March 2018 24 | Real Madrid (Spain) | 83–86 | (Turkey) Fenerbahçe Doğuş | Madrid |
| 21:00 (CEST) | Scoring by quarter: 20-20, 25-20, 20-28, 18-18 |
| | Pts: Carroll 15; Rebs: Ayón, Tavares 6 Asts: Campazzo 5 PIR: Dončić 17 | Boxscore | Pts: Sloukas 20; Rebs: Thompson 6 Asts: Sloukas 4 PIR: Sloukas 24 | Arena: WiZink Center; Attendance: 11,385; Referees: Luigi Lamonica (ITA), Matej Boltauzer (SLO), Tomislav Hordov |

| 8 March 2018 25 | Real Madrid (Spain) | 92–75 | (Greece) Panathinaikos Superfoods | Madrid |
| 21:00 (CET) | Scoring by quarter: 19-20, 19-17, 26-18, 28-20 |
| | Pts: Causeur 26; Rebs: Tavares 8 Asts: Campazzo 5 PIR: Causeur 29 | Boxscore | Pts: James 23; Rebs: Antetokounmpo 7 Asts: James 4 PIR: James 24 | Arena: WiZink Center; Attendance: 10,081; Referees: Ilija Belosevic (SRB), Borys Ryzhyk (UKR), Emin Mogulkoc (TUR) |

| 13 March 2018 26 | AX Armani Exchange Olimpia Milan (Italy) | 77–88 | (Spain) Real Madrid | Milan |
| 20:45 (CET) | Scoring by quarter: 17-25, 19-24, 18-19, 23-20 |
| | Pts: Jerrells 18; Rebs: Goudelock 7 Asts: Jerrells 6 PIR: Jerrells 22 | Boxscore | Pts: Ayón 15; Rebs: Thompkins 8 Asts: Campazzo 11; PIR: Campazzo 27 | Arena: Mediolanum Forum; Attendance: 10,250; Referees: Christos Christodoulou (GRE), Olegs Latisevs (LAT), Robert Vyklicky (CZE) |

| 20 March 2018 27 | Valencia Basket (Spain) | 96–88 | (Spain) Real Madrid | Valencia |
| 20:30 (CET) | Scoring by quarter: 22-21, 24-19, 24-20, 26-28 |
| | Pts: Dubljević 17; Rebs: Dubljević 7 Asts: Van Rossom 5 PIR: Dubljević 18 | Boxscore | Pts: Campazzo 17; Rebs: Randolph 9 Asts: Campazzo 12; PIR: Campazzo 29 | Arena: Pavelló Municipal Font de San Lluís; Attendance: 7,020; Referees: Sasa Pukl (SLO), Spiros Gkontas (GRE), Uros Obknezevic |

| 22 March 2018 28 | Real Madrid (Spain) | 88–81 | (Lithuania) Žalgiris | Madrid |
| 21:00 (CET) | Scoring by quarter: 19-16, 22-28, 24-18, 23-19 |
| | Pts: Reyes 16; Rebs: Tavares 9 Asts: Campazzo 8 PIR: Reyes 21 | Boxscore | Pts: Jankūnas 21; Rebs: Jankūnas, Milaknis 4 Asts: Micić 7 PIR: Jankūnas 19 | Arena: WiZink Center; Attendance: 10,496; Referees: Ilija Belosevic (SRB), Piotr Pastusiak (POL), Mario Majkis (SLO) |

| 30 March 2018 29 | Crvena zvezda mts (Serbia) | 79–82 | (Spain) Real Madrid | Belgrade |
| 19:00 (CET) | Scoring by quarter: 20-27, 19-16, 18-21, 22-18 |
| | Pts: Omić 30; Rebs: Omić 10; Asts: Feldeine 9 PIR: Omić 30 | [ Boxscore] | Pts: Dončić 24; Rebs: Dončić, Reyes 9 Asts: Fernández 5 PIR: Dončić 35 | Arena: Aleksandar Nikolić Hall; Attendance: 5,745; Referees: Christos Christodoulou (GRE), Jakub Zamojski (POL), Emin Mogulkoc (TUR) |

| 6 April 2018 30 | Real Madrid (Spain) | 106–86 | (Germany) Brose Bamberg | Madrid |
| 21:00 (CET) | Scoring by quarter: 27-28, 26-22, 29-19, 24-17 |
| | Pts: Randolph 23; Rebs: Ayón 8 Asts: Fernández 8 PIR: Randolph 38 | Boxscore | Pts: Hackett 17; Rebs: Musli 8 Asts: Zisis 6 PIR: Hackett 19 | Arena: WiZink Center; Attendance: 9,468; Referees: Milivoje Jovcic (SRB), Ioannis Foufis (GRE), Amit Balak (ISR) |

==== Results overview ====
Win Draw Loss

| Opposition | Home score | Away score | Double |
|---|---|---|---|
| (Turkey) Anadolu Efes | 87-68 | 74-88 | 175-142 |
| (Italy) AX Armani Exchange Olimpia | 100-90 | 77-88 | 188-167 |
| (Spain) Baskonia | 75-73 | 75-105 | 150-178 |
| (Germany) Brose Bamberg | 106-86 | 66-81 | 187-152 |
| (Serbia) Crvena zvezda mts | 83-87 | 79-82 | 165-166 |
| (Russia) CSKA Moscow | 82-69 | 87-93 | 169-162 |
| (Spain) FC Barcelona Lassa | 87-75 | 74-101 | 188-149 |
| (Turkey) Fenerbahçe Doğuş | 83-86 | 77-79 | 160-162 |
| (Russia) Khimki | 80-86 | 78-95 | 181-158 |
| (Israel) Maccabi FOX Tel Aviv | 93-81 | 83-90 | 176-171 |
| (Greece) Olympiacos | 79-80 | 92-83 | 162-173 |
| (Greece) Panathinaikos Superfoods | 92-75 | 80-82 | 170-157 |
| (Spain) Valencia Basket | 91-72 | 96-88 | 179-160 |
| (Spain) Unicaja | 89-57 | 75-80 | 164-137 |
| (Lithuania) Žalgiris | 88-81 | 66-87 | 175-148 |

=== Euroleague Playoffs ===
==== Quarterfinals ====
Win Loss

| 17 April 2018 1 | Panathinaikos Superfoods (Greece) | 95–67 | (Spain) Real Madrid | Athens |
| 19:00 (CET) | Scoring by quarter: 26–13, 20–17, 31–14, 18–23 |
| | Pts: James 24; Rebs: James 8 Asts: Calathes 16; PIR: Calathes 29 | Boxscore | Pts: Thompkins 12; Rebs: Thompkins 7 Asts: Causeur 4 PIR: Thompkins 12 | Arena: Olympic Indoor Hall; Attendance: 18,310; Referees: Luigi Lamonica (ITA), Oļegs Latiševs (LAT), Damir Javor (SLO) |

| 19 April 2018 2 | Panathinaikos Superfoods (Greece) | 82–89 | (Spain) Real Madrid | Athens |
| 19:00 (CET) | Scoring by quarter: 21–16, 19–20, 21–32, 21–21 |
| | Pts: James 20; Rebs: Singleton 5 Asts: James 6 PIR: James 18 | Boxscore | Pts: Reyes 18; Rebs: Ayón 6 Asts: Ayón 5 PIR: Reyes 25 | Arena: Olympic Indoor Hall; Attendance: 18,310; Referees: Sreten RAdovic (CRO), Ilija Belosevic (SRB), Matej Boltauzer |

| 25 April 2018 3 | Real Madrid (Spain) | 81–74 | (Greece) Panathinaikos Superfoods | Madrid |
| 18:45 (CET) | Scoring by quarter: 17–17, 23–17, 17–19, 24–21 |
| | Pts: Carroll 17; Rebs: Dončić 10; Asts: Fernández, Llull 4 PIR: Reyes 14 | Boxscore | Pts: Calathes 26; Rebs: Singleton 9 Asts: Calathes 4 PIR: Calathes 18 | Arena: WiZink Center; Attendance: 11,246; Referees: Robert Lottermoser (GER), Milivoje Jovčić (SRB), Carmelo Paternicò (ITA) |

| 27 April 2018 4 | Real Madrid (Spain) | 89–82 | (Greece) Panathinaikos Superfoods | Madrid |
| 21:00 (CET) | Scoring by quarter: 19-14, 32-21, 27-25, 11-22 |
| | Pts: Dončić 17; Rebs: Ayón 6 Asts: Llull 7 PIR: Dončić 24 | Boxscore | Pts: Singleton 21; Rebs: Gabriel 6 Asts: James 6 PIR: Singleton 20 | Arena: WiZink Center; Attendance: 12,557; Referees: Sreten Radovic (CRO), Fernando Rocha (POR), Olegs Latisevs (LAT) |

Ral Madrid win the series 3-1

=== Euroleague Final Four ===
Win Loss

==== Semi-final ====
| 18 May 2018 Semi-final | CSKA Moscow (Russia) | 83–92 | (Spain) Real Madrid | Belgrade |
| 21:00 (CET) | Scoring by quarter: 30-20, 16-27, 10-16, 27-29 |
| | Pts: de Colo 20; Rebs: Hines 9 Asts: Rodríguez 6 PIR: Hines 23 | Boxscore | Pts: Dončić, Llull 16; Rebs: Ayón 11; Asts: Llull 5 PIR: Dončić, Llull 18 | Arena: Štark Arena; Attendance: 15,232; Referees: Luigi Lamonica (ITA), Robert Lottermose (GER), Matej Boltauzer (SLO) |

==== Final ====
| 20 May 2018 Final | Real Madrid (Spain) | 85–80 | (Turkey) Fenerbahçe Doğuş | Belgrade |
| 20:00 (CET) | Scoring by quarter: 21-17, 17-23, 25-15, 22-25 |
| | Pts: Causeur 17; Rebs: Three Players 5 Asts: Dončić 4 PIR: Causeur 21 | Boxscore | Pts: Melli 28; Rebs: Melli 6 Asts: Wanamaker 5 PIR: Melli 27 | Arena: Štark Arena; Attendance: 16,967; Referees: Luigi Lamonica (ITA), Borys Ryzhyk (UKR), Olegs Latisevs (LAT) |

=== Copa del Rey ===
==== Quarterfinals ====
Win Loss

| 15 February 2018 Quarterfinals | Real Madrid | 89–84 | Unicaja | Las Palmas |
| 21:30 (CEST) | Scoring by quarter: 26-23, 20-22, 18-21, 25-18 |
| | Pts: Campazzo 18; Rebs: Tavares 9 Asts: Campazzo 7 PIR: Campazzo 33 | Boxscore | Pts: Suárez 17; Rebs: Shermadini 7 Asts: Nedović, Suárez 3 PIR: Suárez 23 | Arena: Gran Canaria Arena; Attendance: 9,327; Referees: J.A. Martín Bertrán, Carlos Peruga, Castillo |

==== Semifinals ====
| 17 February 2018 Semifinals | Real Madrid | 77–59 | Iberostar Tenerife | Las Palmas |
| 19:00 (CEST) | Scoring by quarter: 11-19, 26-19, 19-11, 21-10 |
| | Pts: Dončić 17; Rebs: Dončić, Tavares 7 Asts: Dončić 5 PIR: Dončić 28 | Boxscore | Pts: Vázquez 16; Rebs: Abromaitis 8 Asts: San Miguel, Bassas 4 PIR: Vázquez 15 | Arena: Gran Canaria Arena; Attendance: 9,346; Referees: M.A. Pérez Pérez, Jiménez Trujillo, Carlos Cortés |

==== Final ====
| 18 February 2018 Final | Real Madrid | 90–92 | FC Barcelona Bàsquet | Las Palmas |
| 18:30 (CEST) | Scoring by quarter: 21-15, 13-25, 18-27, 38-25 |
| | Pts: Thompkins 17; Rebs: Dončić 5 Asts: Dončić, Campazzo 3 PIR: Thompkins 18 | Boxscore | Pts: Ribas 21; Rebs: Moerman 7 Asts: THeurtel 5 PIR: Ribas 24 | Arena: Gran Canaria Arena; Attendance: 9,912; Referees: Daniel Hierrezuelo, E. Pérez Pizarro, Carlos Peruga |

=== Supercopa de España ===
Win Loss

| 22 September 2017 Semifinals | Gran Canaria | 73–64 | Real Madrid | Las Palmas |
| 21:30 (CEST) | Scoring by quarter: 24-17, 13-11, 14-11, 22-25 |
| | Pts: Pasečņiks 11; Rebs: McKissic 7 Asts: Oliver 6 PIR: Báez 19 | Boxscore | Pts: Ayón 17; Rebs: Campazzo 5 Asts: Campazzo 3 PIR: Ayón 21 | Arena: Gran Canaria Arena; Attendance: 9,386; Referees: Miguel Ángel Pérez Pérez, Carlos Cortés Rey, Jordi Aliaga Solé |

== Statistics ==
Legend
| GP | Games played | GS | Games started | MPG | Minutes per game |
| FG% | Field-goal percentage | 3FG% | 3-point field-goal percentage | FT% | Free-throw percentage |
| RPG | Rebounds per game | APG | Assists per game | SPG | Steals per game |
| BPG | Blocks per game | PPG | Points per game | PIR | PIR per game |

=== Liga ACB ===
| Player | GP | GS | MPG | PPG | FG% | 3FG% | FT% | RPG | APG | SPG | BPG | PIR |
|---|---|---|---|---|---|---|---|---|---|---|---|---|
| Gustavo Ayón | 25 | 12 | 20:08 | 6.8 | 56% | - | 60% | 5.6 | 2.1 | 0.4 | 0.4 | 10.6 |
| Facundo Campazzo | 33 | 32 | 22:37 | 9.1 | 57% | 36% | 74% | 1.8 | 4 | 1.5 | 0.1 | 11.9 |
| Jaycee Carroll | 42 | 14 | 18:25 | 12.1 | 57% | 49% | 85% | 1.8 | 0.6 | 0.5 | 0.1 | 11 |
| Fabien Causeur | 38 | 24 | 18:31 | 7.3 | 60% | 45% | 77% | 1.9 | 1.5 | 0.6 | 0.4 | 7.6 |
| Luka Dončić | 37 | 21 | 24:34 | 12.5 | 60% | 29% | 75% | 5.7 | 4.8 | 1.1 | 0.4 | 18.4 |
| Rudy Fernández | 34 | 2 | 17:29 | 9.7 | 52% | 44% | 85% | 2.5 | 1.9 | 0.9 | 0.3 | 11.1 |
| Ognjen Kuzmić | 4 | 0 | 16:25 | 6.5 | 78% | - | 44% | 3.2 | 2 | 0 | 0.3 | 7.8 |
| Sergio Llull | 14 | 0 | 20:25 | 9.3 | 40% | 30% | 87% | 1.8 | 3.6 | 0.6 | 0.1 | 9.3 |
| Jonas Mačiulis | 13 | 0 | 16:24 | 4.2 | 66% | 37% | 70% | 2.9 | 0.8 | 0.9 | 0 | 5.3 |
| Mario Nakić | 1 | 0 | 6:00 | 1 | 50% | - | - | 1 | 0 | 0 | 0 | 1 |
| Melwin Pantzar | 4 | 1 | 9:25 | 1 | 40% | 0% | - | 0.7 | 0.3 | 0.5 | 0 | -0.5 |
| Dino Radončić | 24 | 5 | 12:35 | 3 | 53% | 26% | 83% | 1.6 | 1.7 | 0.2 | 0.1 | 2.7 |
| Chasson Randle | 23 | 2 | 12:35 | 4.7 | 52% | 30% | 78% | 0.7 | 1.3 | 0.3 | 0 | 3.1 |
| Anthony Randolph | 25 | 14 | 19:00 | 8.7 | 42% | 32% | 77% | 4.6 | 0.6 | 0.6 | 0.4 | 9.2 |
| Felipe Reyes | 39 | 12 | 15:20 | 8 | 58% | 10% | 72% | 4.2 | 1 | 0.3 | 0.1 | 9.8 |
| Walter Tavares | 36 | 28 | 21:03 | 7.9 | 68% | 0% | 58% | 6.3 | 0.5 | 0.4 | 2.2 | 14.4 |
| Jeffery Taylor | 36 | 20 | 16:37 | 6 | 58% | 46% | 73% | 1.3 | 1.1 | 0.3 | 0.1 | 12.2 |
| Trey Thompkins | 27 | 15 | 20:18 | 9.1 | 63% | 35% | 81% | 3.1 | 0.9 | 0.3 | 0.2 | 8.5 |
| Santiago Yusta | 33 | 13 | 13:03 | 4.5 | 52% | 31% | 86% | 1.4 | 0.8 | 0.3 | 0.2 | 4.1 |
| TOTAL | | | | 90.6 | 60% | 38% | 75% | 37.6 | 18 | 6.8 | 3.7 | 83.6 |

Last updated: June 23, 2018.
Source: ACB

=== EuroLeague ===
| Player | GP | GS | MPG | PPG | FG% | 3FG% | FT% | RPG | APG | SPG | BPG | PIR |
|---|---|---|---|---|---|---|---|---|---|---|---|---|
| Gustavo Ayón | 18 | 11 | 23:00 | 9.3 | 58% | - | 58% | 5.8 | 2.8 | 1.4 | 0.8 | 14.2 |
| Facundo Campazzo | 30 | 28 | 23:06 | 7.9 | 42% | 38% | 53% | 2.4 | 4.5 | 1.4 | 0.1 | 10.3 |
| Jaycee Carroll | 36 | 5 | 15:57 | 9.4 | 57% | 46% | 96% | 0.9 | 0.5 | 0.3 | 0.2 | 7.1 |
| Fabien Causeur | 36 | 24 | 18:07 | 6.9 | 59% | 44% | 71% | 1.6 | 1.9 | 0.4 | 0.1 | 7.2 |
| Luka Dončić | 33 | 17 | 25:56 | 16 | 57% | 33% | 82% | 4.8 | 4.3 | 1.1 | 0.3 | 21.5 |
| Rudy Fernández | 31 | 2 | 19:21 | 7.4 | 41% | 37% | 88% | 2.5 | 2.6 | 0.7 | 0.2 | 9 |
| Ognjen Kuzmić | 2 | 0 | 4:46 | 1 | 33% | - | - | 2 | 0 | 0 | 0 | 0.5 |
| Sergio Llull | 4 | 0 | 17:59 | 10 | 33% | 38% | 50% | 0.5 | 4.5 | 0.5 | 0 | 6.5 |
| Jonas Mačiulis | 22 | 1 | 12:55 | 3 | 56% | 30% | 88% | 1.8 | 0.4 | 0.5 | 0.1 | 2.7 |
| Dino Radončić | 7 | 2 | 6:29 | 1 | 67% | 17% | - | 0.4 | 0.1 | 0.1 | 0 | -0.1 |
| Chasson Randle | 23 | 0 | 7:35 | 2.6 | 43% | 45% | 75% | 0.5 | 1 | 0.2 | 0 | 1.7 |
| Anthony Randolph | 21 | 11 | 17:56 | 8.2 | 55% | 31% | 66% | 3.8 | 1.2 | 0.7 | 0.3 | 9.6 |
| Felipe Reyes | 35 | 7 | 15:31 | 8.4 | 59% | 43% | 79% | 4.3 | 0.8 | 0.2 | 0.2 | 10.9 |
| Walter Tavares | 29 | 23 | 17:26 | 6.5 | 68% | - | 62% | 5.3 | 0.5 | 0.4 | 1.5 | 10.6 |
| Jeffery Taylor | 34 | 23 | 20:33 | 5.9 | 47% | 35% | 70% | 1.9 | 1.2 | 0.5 | 0.1 | 4.7 |
| Trey Thompkins | 29 | 16 | 21:11 | 9.5 | 54% | 42% | 86% | 5.1 | 1.1 | 0.7 | 0.3 | 11.1 |
| Santiago Yusta | 16 | 10 | 6:44 | 2.4 | 60% | 27% | 71% | 0.9 | 0.8 | 0.1 | 0.1 | 2.3 |
| TOTAL | | | | 85.8 | 55% | 35% | 77% | 35.7 | 19.3 | 6.8 | 3.3 | 102.7 |

Last updated: 23 June 2018.
Source: euroleague.net

=== Copa del Rey ===
| Player | GP | GS | MPG | PPG | FG% | 3FG% | FT% | RPG | APG | SPG | BPG | PIR |
|---|---|---|---|---|---|---|---|---|---|---|---|---|
| Gustavo Ayón | 1 | 0 | 3:00 | 3 | 50% | - | 50% | 1 | 0 | 0 | 0 | 0 |
| Facundo Campazzo | 3 | 3 | 22 | 12.6 | 59% | 37% | 93% | 2.6 | 3.3 | 1.3 | 0 | 18 |
| Jaycee Carroll | 3 | 0 | 17 | 11.6 | 87% | 43% | - | 1 | 0.3 | 0.3 | 0.3 | 8 |
| Fabien Causeur | 3 | 3 | 16 | 11.6 | 33% | 33% | 100% | 1.6 | 0.3 | 0 | 0 | 4 |
| Luka Dončić | 3 | 2 | 25 | 14 | 40% | 28% | 80% | 5.6 | 4.3 | 1.6 | 0 | 21.6 |
| Rudy Fernández | 3 | 0 | 24 | 12.6 | 40% | 44% | 75% | 3 | 0.3 | 2.6 | 0 | 10.6 |
| Jonas Mačiulis | 1 | 0 | 2:00 | 0 | - | - | - | 1 | 0 | 0 | 0 | -1 |
| Anthony Randolph | 3 | 0 | 15 | 3.6 | 44% | 25% | - | 2.3 | 0 | 0 | 0.6 | 2 |
| Felipe Reyes | 3 | 0 | 11 | 1.3 | 50% | - | - | 1.6 | 0 | 0.3 | 0.3 | 2 |
| Walter Tavares | 3 | 2 | 20 | 4.6 | 55% | 0% | 100% | 6.6 | 0.3 | 1.3 | 2.3 | 12.3 |
| Jeffery Taylor | 3 | 2 | 18 | 2 | 25% | 20% | 50% | 1 | 0.3 | 0.3 | 0 | 0.3 |
| Trey Thompkins | 3 | 3 | 25 | 14.6 | 64% | 43% | 100% | 3.3 | 0 | 0.3 | 0 | 12.6 |
| TOTAL | | | | 86.9 | 51% | 37% | 87% | 30.6 | 9.4 | 6.7 | 3.5 | 90.4 |

Last updated: February 19, 2018.
Source: ACB

=== Supercopa de España ===
| Player | GP | GS | MPG | PPG | FG% | 3FG% | FT% | RPG | APG | SPG | BPG | PIR |
|---|---|---|---|---|---|---|---|---|---|---|---|---|
| Gustavo Ayón | 1 | 1 | 23:26 | 17 | 80% | - | 100% | 5 | 2 | 1 | 1 | 21 |
| Facundo Campazzo | 1 | 1 | 34:08 | 3 | 33% | 0% | 50% | 5 | 3 | 0 | 0 | 4 |
| Jaycee Carroll | 1 | 0 | 20:50 | 14 | 44% | 33% | - | 2 | 1 | 0 | 0 | 6 |
| Fabien Causeur | 1 | 0 | 13:18 | 4 | 0% | 100% | 50% | 2 | 0 | 0 | 0 | 3 |
| Luka Dončić | 1 | 0 | 23:15 | 6 | 100% | 20% | 50% | 4 | 1 | 1 | 0 | 8 |
| Rudy Fernández | 1 | 1 | 15:25 | 0 | 0% | 0% | - | 3 | 0 | 0 | 0 | -3 |
| Ognjen Kuzmić | 1 | 0 | 14:22 | 4 | 67% | - | - | 1 | 0 | 1 | 0 | 2 |
| Anthony Randolph | 1 | 0 | 16:15 | 2 | 0% | 100% | 25% | 2 | 0 | 3 | 1 | 3 |
| Felipe Reyes | 1 | 1 | 6:15 | 0 | 0% | - | - | 4 | 1 | 0 | 0 | -2 |
| Jeffery Taylor | 1 | 1 | 13:34 | 4 | 50% | 0% | - | 4 | 0 | 1 | 0 | 3 |
| Trey Thompkins | 1 | 0 | 19:12 | 10 | 67% | 67% | - | 5 | 1 | 0 | 0 | 9 |
| TOTAL | | | | 64 | 49% | 26% | 36% | 36 | 8 | 8 | 2 | 55 |

Last updated: November, 2017.
Source: ACB
