= Vincent Poirier =

French basketball player (born 1993)

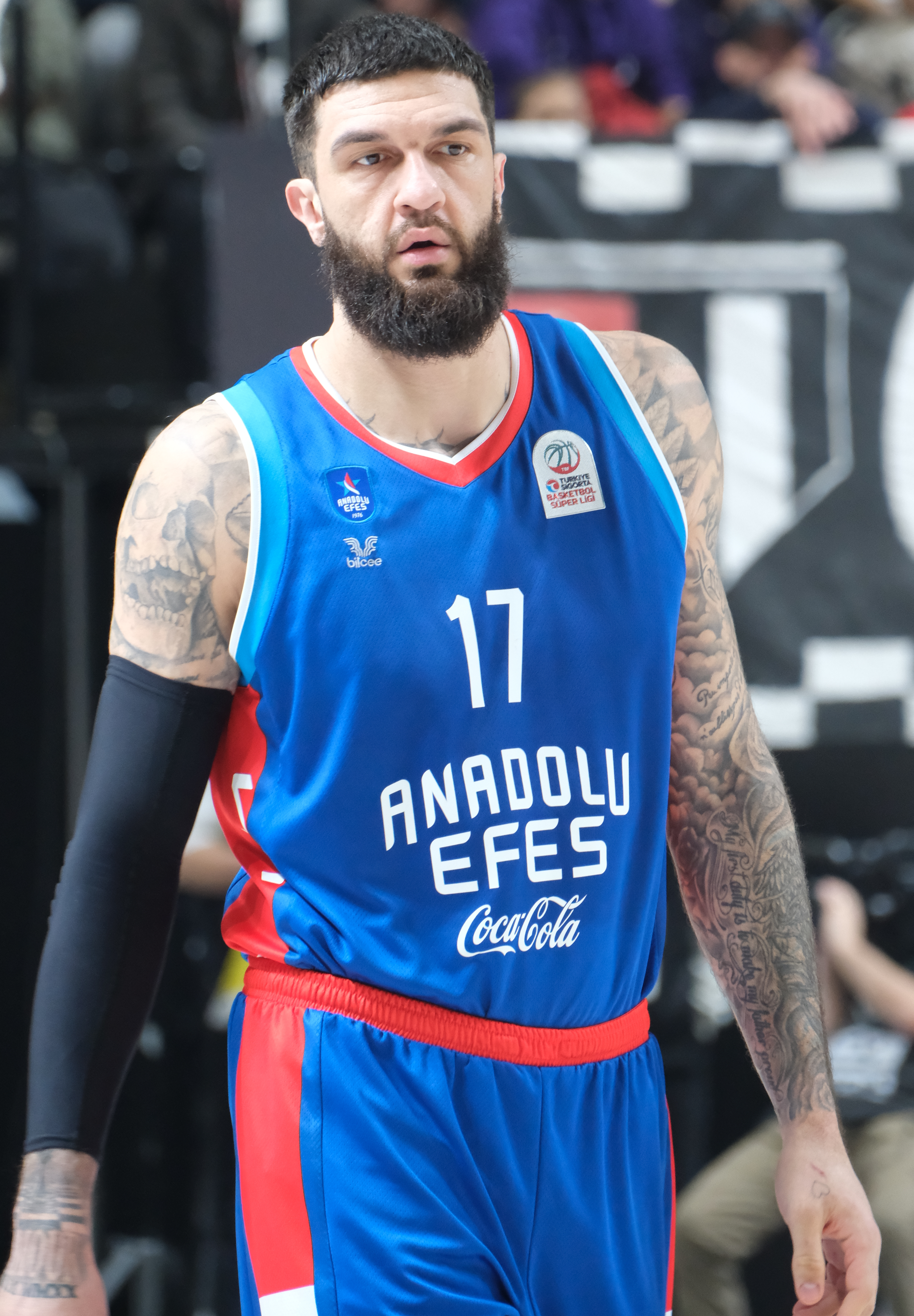
- Poirier with Anadolu Efes in 2025

Free agent
- Position: Center

Personal information
- Born: 17 October 1993 (age 33) Clamart, France
- Listed height: 7 ft 0 in (2.13 m)
- Listed weight: 242 lb (110 kg)

Career information
- NBA draft: 2015: undrafted
- Playing career: 2012–present

Career history
- 2012–2017: Paris-Levallois
- 2014–2015: →Hyères-Toulon
- 2015–2016: →Centre Fédéral
- 2017–2019: Baskonia
- 2019–2020: Boston Celtics
- 2019: →Maine Red Claws
- 2020–2021: Philadelphia 76ers
- 2021–2024: Real Madrid
- 2024–2026: Anadolu Efes

Career highlights
- EuroLeague champion (2023); All-EuroLeague Second Team (2019); EuroLeague rebounding leader (2019); 2× EuroLeague blocks leader (2024, 2025); 2× Liga ACB champion (2022, 2024); Spanish Cup winner (2024); French Cup winner (2013); Turkish Super Cup winner (2024); 3× Spanish Supercup winner (2021–2023); French Supercup winner (2013)
- Stats at NBA.com
- Stats at Basketball Reference
Medals
Men's basketball
Representing France
Summer Olympics
Silver medal – second place	2020 Tokyo	Team
FIBA World Cup
Bronze medal – third place	2019 China
EuroBasket
Silver medal – second place	2022 Czech Republic–Georgia–Italy–Germany

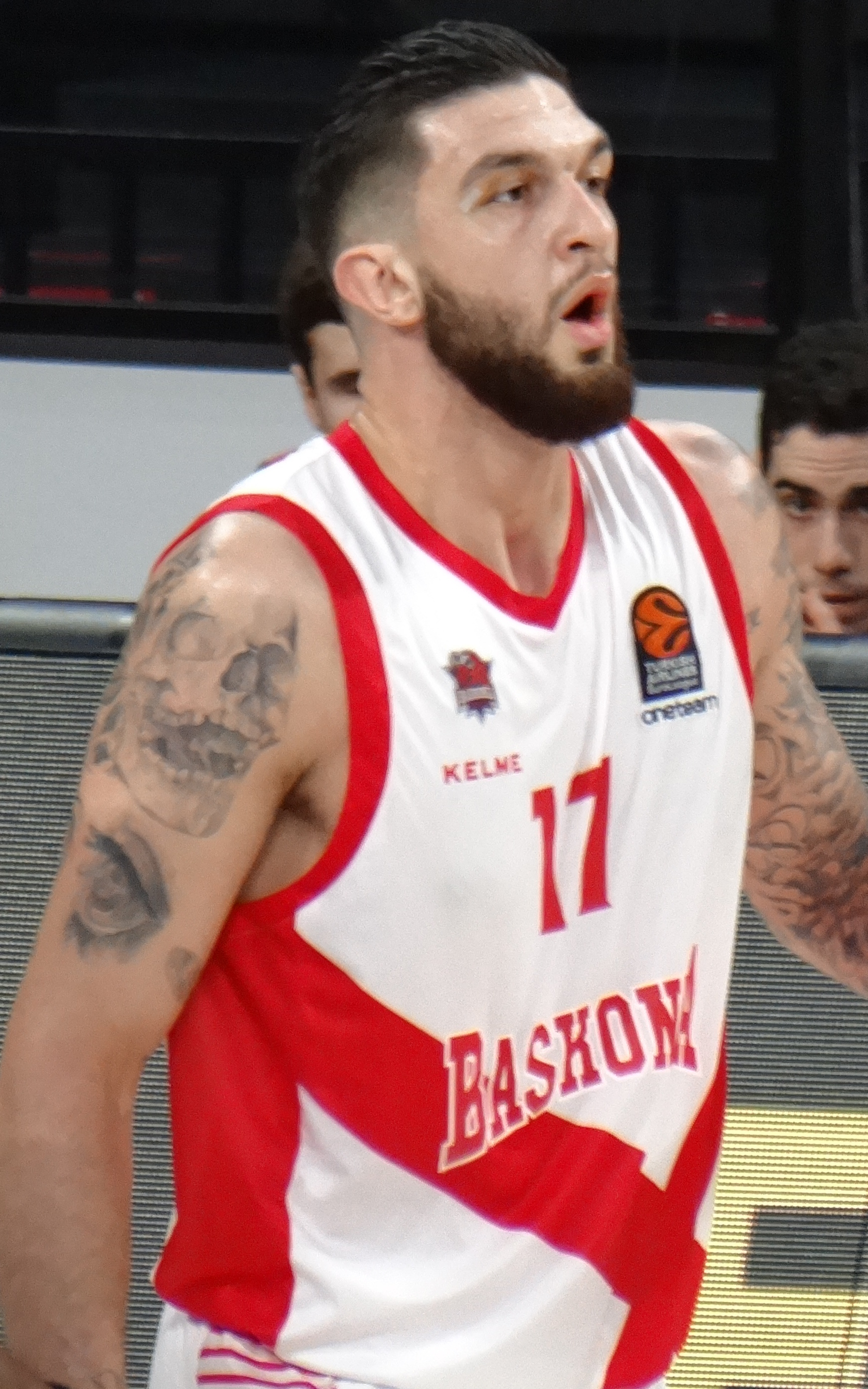
Poirier with Baskonia in 2017

Vincent Yann Poirier (born 17 October 1993) is a French professional basketball player who last played for Anadolu Efes of the Turkish Basketbol Süper Ligi and the EuroLeague. He also represents the French national team in international competition.

== Professional career ==
=== Europe ===
Poirier started to play basketball in May 2010 at the Bussy Basket Club. In the 2013–14 season, he finished as the top rebounder of the Espoirs championship, averaging 12 points and 10.8 rebounds in 27 minutes over 30 games.

On 24 April 2014, he signed a three-year deal with Paris-Levallois, but was loaned to Hyères-Toulon of the Pro B. He started the season being a solid rotation player with Davante Gardner. On 14 February 2015, he contributed against Angers by finishing the game with 10 points and 4 rebounds in just 10 minutes.

For the 2015–16 season, he returned to Paris-Levallois. From December onward, he was subject to a special designation allowing him to be able to play both with Paris-Levallois, and with CFBB in National 1. In December 2015, Frédéric Fauthoux replaced Antoine Rigaudeau as coach, which allowed Poirier a greater chance to show his potential. In April 2016, he was named MVP of the Round after finishing the match against BCM Gravelines-Dunkerque with 23 points, 12 rebounds and 2 assists in 25 minutes, when he started the game as a backup.

In July 2016, he participated in the NBA Summer League with Orlando Magic. In his first game, he finished with 6 points, 5 rebounds and 1 assist in 15 minutes. Over five games, he averaged 4.2 points, 4.4 rebounds, 0.6 assists and 0.4 blocks in 11.5 minutes per game. On 11 September 2016, as part of the pre-season, he and his team won the Sarthe/Pays de la Loire trophy in a three-team tournament by beating Le Mans and Antwerp.

On 14 June 2017, Poirier signed a three-year deal with Baskonia of the Spanish Liga ACB and the EuroLeague. In the 2018–19 season, Poirier led the EuroLeague in rebounding, averaging 8.3 per game. On 10 May 2019 Poirier earned a spot in the All-EuroLeague Second Team.

=== NBA ===
On 15 July 2019, Poirier parted ways with Baskonia to sign a contract with the Boston Celtics.

On 19 November 2020, Poirier was traded to the Oklahoma City Thunder for a conditional future second-round pick. On 8 December, Poirier along with Danny Green and Terrance Ferguson, were traded to the Philadelphia 76ers.

On 25 March 2021, Poirier was traded to the New York Knicks in a three-team trade involving the Oklahoma City Thunder and was waived four days later.

=== Real Madrid ===
On 12 April 2021, Poirier signed a deal with Real Madrid until the end of the 2023–24 season.

=== Anadolu Efes ===
On 25 June 2024, Poirier signed a three-year contract with Turkish powerhouse Anadolu Efes.

== Career statistics ==
Legend
GP	Games played	GS	Games started	MPG	Minutes per game
FG%	Field-goal percentage	3P%	3-point field-goal percentage	FT%	Free-throw percentage
RPG	Rebounds per game	APG	Assists per game	SPG	Steals per game
BPG	Blocks per game	PPG	Points per game	PIR	Performance index rating
**Bold**	Career high

=== NBA ===
==== Regular season ====
Year	Team	GP	GS	MPG	FG%	3P%	FT%	RPG	APG	SPG	BPG	PPG
2019–20	Boston	**22**	0	**5.9**	**.472**	**.500**	**.857**	**2.0**	**.4**	**.1**	**.4**	**1.9**
2020–21	Philadelphia	10	0	3.9	.250	.000	.333	1.4	.2	.0	.3	0.8
Career		32	0	5.3	.417	.333	.615	1.8	.3	.1	.4	1.5

==== Playoffs ====
Year	Team	GP	GS	MPG	FG%	3P%	FT%	RPG	APG	SPG	BPG	PPG
2020	Boston	1	0	2.0	—	—	—	.0	1.0	1.0	.0	.0
Career		1	0	2.0	—	—	—	.0	1.0	1.0	.0	.0

=== EuroLeague ===
†	Denotes season in which Poirier won the EuroLeague
*	Led the league

Year	Team	GP	GS	MPG	FG%	3P%	FT%	RPG	APG	SPG	BPG	PPG	PIR
2017–18	Baskonia	34	23	17.9	.573	—	.725	5.2	1.0	.6	.9	8.2	10.9
2018–19	Baskonia	34	**26**	**25.6**	.617	—	.731	**8.3***	**1.1**	**.8**	.8	**11.9**	**17.7**
2021–22	Real Madrid	**37**	5	18.0	.571	.167	**.768**	5.5	.9	.8	.9	7.4	11.7
2022–23†	Real Madrid	32	1	14.6	.603	**.400**	.727	4.0	.6	.3	.9	6.1	8.2
2023–24	Real Madrid	37	5	18.4	**.668**	**.400**	.706	5.3	.6	.4	**1.5***	9.0	13.4
Career		174	60	18.9	.609	.313	.732	5.7	.9	.6	1.0	8.5	12.4

== Awards and accomplishments ==
=== Professional career ===
- French Cup champion: 2013
- Match des Champions champion: 2013

=== Individual awards ===
- Best rebounder of the Espoirs championship: 2013–14
- EuroLeague rebounding leader: 2018–19
