= Match des Champions (basketball) =

Super cup basketball game in France

- Current season, competition or edition: 2026 Match des Champions
- Sport: Basketball
- Founded: 2005; 21 years ago
- No. of teams: 2
- Country: France
- Continent: Europe
- Most recent champion: Paris Basketball (1st title)
- Most titles: Nancy, ASVEL, Nanterre 92 (2 titles each)
- Related competitions: LNB Élite; French Cup (Federation Cup); Leaders Cup (League Cup); Élite 2 (2nd-tier)

The Match des Champions (English: Match of champions) or French Basketball Supercup, is an annual super cup basketball game in France. It was held from 2005 to 2017 as a single match between the champions of the top-tier level league in France, the LNB Élite , and the French Federation Cup winner. The competition was revived in 2025 as a final four tournament format, with the Leaders Cup and Élite 2 winners also invited.

== Title holders ==
- 2005 BCM Gravelines-Dunkerque
- 2006 JDA Dijon
- 2007 Pau-Orthez
- 2008 SLUC Nancy
- 2009 ASVEL
- 2010 Cholet
- 2011 SLUC Nancy
- 2012 Limoges CSP
- 2013 Paris-Levallois
- 2014 JSF Nanterre
- 2015 SIG
- 2016 ASVEL
- 2017 Nanterre 92
- 2025 AS Monaco
- 2026 Paris Basketball

== Finals ==
Season	Winners	Score	Runners-up	Location	MVP	Ref
2005	BCM Gravelines-Dunkerque	88–71	SIG	Gravelines	—N/a	
2006	JDA Dijon	70–69	Le Mans Sarthe	Dijon	—N/a	
2007	Pau-Orthez	79–74	Chorale Roanne	Pau	(United States) David Young	
2008	SLUC Nancy	76–73	ASVEL	Nancy	(France) Victor Samnick	
2009	ASVEL	76–54	Le Mans Sarthe	Angers	(United States) Bobby Dixon	
2010	Cholet	85–79 (OT)	Orléans Loiret	Cholet	(France) Fabien Causeur	
2011	SLUC Nancy	89–83	Élan Chalon	Nancy	(France) Nicolas Batum	
2012	Limoges CSP	78–76	Élan Chalon	Paris	(France) Jean-Michel Mipoka	
2013	Paris-Levallois	81–72	JSF Nanterre	Mouilleron-le-Captif	(France) Nicolas Lang	
2014	JSF Nanterre	70–54	Limoges CSP	Rouen	(United States) Kyle Weems	
2015	SIG	86–59	Limoges CSP	Lyon	(France) Rodrigue Beaubois	
2016	ASVEL	75–71	Le Mans Sarthe	Mouilleron-le-Captif	(Jamaica) Adrian Uter	
2017	Nanterre 92	95–69	Élan Chalon	Mouilleron-le-Captif	(United States) Terran Petteway	
2025	AS Monaco	104–79	Le Mans Sarthe	Paris	(United States) Mike James	
2026	Paris Basketball	81–59	Chorale Roanne	Paris	(France) Nadir Hifi	

== Performance by club ==
Club	Winners	Winning years
SLUC Nancy	2	2008, 2011
Nanterre 92	2	2014, 2017
ASVEL	2	2009, 2016
BCM Gravelines-Dunkerque	1	2005
JDA Dijon	1	2006
Pau-Lacq-Orthez	1	2007
Cholet	1	2010
Limoges CSP	1	2012
Levallois Metropolitans	1	2013
SIG	1	2015
AS Monaco	1	2025
Paris Basketball	1	2026
