= 2016 Match des Champions =

Le Mans	ASVEL
71	75
- Date: 20 September 2016
- Venue: Vendespace, Mouilleron-le-Captif
- MVP: (Jamaica) Adrian Uter

The 2016 Match des Champions was the 11th edition of the annual super cup game in French basketball. This year the reigning LNB Pro A champions ASVEL faced off against French Cup champions Le Mans.

ASVEL beat Le Mans 75–81. Adrian Uter was named the games Most Valuable Player.

== Match ==
20 September 2016	Le Mans	71–75	ASVEL	Vendespace, Mouilleron-le-Captif
20:30 (CET)	Scoring by quarter: 17–17, 11–22, 30–13, 13–23
	Pts: Hanlan 18; Rebs: Yeguete 11; Asts: Pearson, Watson, Yeguete 2	Boxscore	Pts: Uter 17; Rebs: Watkins, Sy 7 Asts: Hodge 8	Referees: Joseph Bissang, Mehdi Difallah, Johan Jeanneau
