= 2013 Match des Champions =

Paris-Levallois Basket	JSF Nanterre
72	81
- Date: September 25, 2013
- Venue: Vendéspace, Mouilleron-le-Captif
- MVP: (France) Nicolas Lang

The 2013 Match des Champions was the 8th edition of the annual super cup game in French basketball. This year the reigning LNB Pro A champions JSF Nanterre faced off against French Cup champions Paris-Levallois Basket. The game was played in the Vendéspace in Mouilleron-le-Captif.

== Match ==
September 25, 2013
21:00

Boxscore

JSF Nanterre	72–81	Paris-Levallois Basket
Pts: Leslie, Daniels 17; Rebs: Leslie 8 Asts: Meacham 4		Pts: Lang 21; Rebs: Lang 10; Asts: Ewing 3

Vendéspace, Mouilleron-le-Captif

Nanterre	Paris-Levallois

MVP
(France) Nicolas Lang
Game rules
Game was played under FIBA rules.

2013 Match des Champions Winners
Paris-Levallois Basket
(1st title)
