= Chasson Randle =

American basketball player (born 1993)

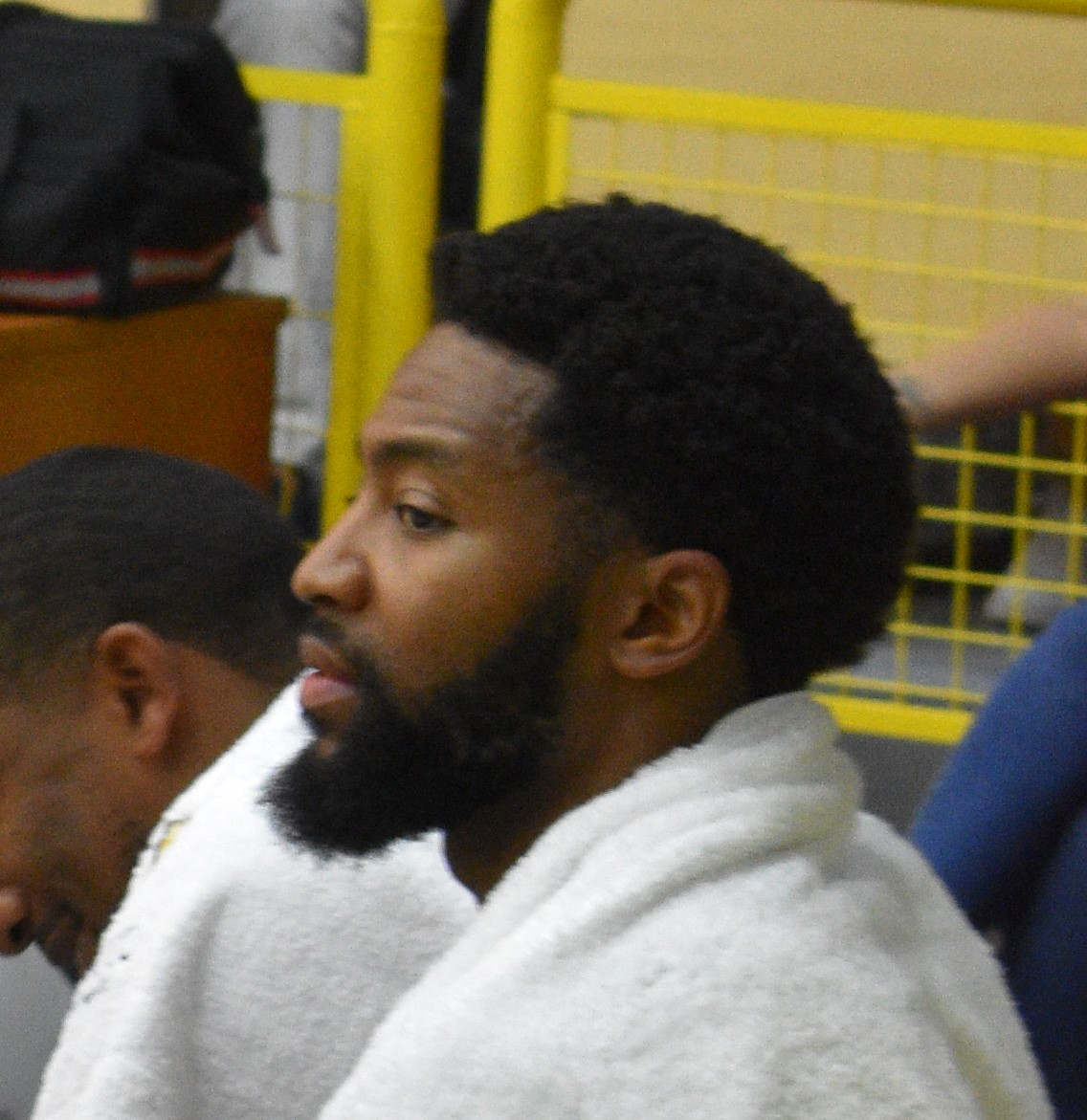
- Randle in 2023

Free agent
- Position: Point guard / shooting guard

Personal information
- Born: February 5, 1993 (age 33) Rock Island, Illinois, U.S.
- Listed height: 6 ft 1 in (1.85 m)
- Listed weight: 192 lb (87 kg)

Career information
- High school: Rock Island (Rock Island, Illinois)
- College: Stanford (2011–2015)
- NBA draft: 2015: undrafted
- Playing career: 2015–present

Career history
- 2015–2016: ČEZ Nymburk
- 2016–2017: Westchester Knicks
- 2017: Philadelphia 76ers
- 2017: →Delaware 87ers
- 2017: New York Knicks
- 2017–2018: Real Madrid
- 2018: Capital City Go-Go
- 2018–2019: Washington Wizards
- 2019–2020: Tianjin Pioneers
- 2020: Golden State Warriors
- 2021: Oklahoma City Blue
- 2021: Orlando Magic
- 2021: →Lakeland Magic
- 2021–2022: New Zealand Breakers
- 2022–2023: Grand Rapids Gold
- 2023: Oklahoma City Blue
- 2023: Leones de Ponce
- 2023–2024: AEK Athens
- 2024: Iowa Wolves
- 2025: Stockton Kings
- 2025: APR
- 2025: NBA G League United
- 2025–2026: London Lions
- 2026: Kolossos Rodou

Career highlights
- 2× NBA G League champion (2021, 2025); EuroLeague champion (2018); Liga ACB champion (2018); NBL champion (2016); 2× First-team All-Pac-12 (2014, 2015); First-team Academic All-American (2015); NIT Most Outstanding Player (2015); Illinois Co-Mr. Basketball (2011)
- Stats at NBA.com
- Stats at Basketball Reference
Medals
Men’s basketball
Representing United States
FIBA World U17 Championship
Gold medal – first place	2010 Hamburg	National team
FIBA Americas U16 World Championship
Gold medal – first place	2009 Argentina

Chasson Randle (born February 5, 1993) is an American professional basketball player. He played college basketball for the Stanford Cardinal. As a senior in 2014–15, he was considered one of the top point guards in the country. Born in Rock Island, Illinois, Randle played basketball for Rock Island High School.

== High school career ==
Randle was a highly recruited player out of Rock Island High School. He had led his school to its first Illinois state title, and shared Illinois Mr. Basketball honors with East Aurora's Ryan Boatright in 2011. He had his best season as a senior recording 22.3 points per game and 7.7 rebounds per game. Randle is Rock Island's all-time leader in scoring with 2,159 points and rebounding with 773 boards. He was named in ESPN 100 top recruits for 2011 receiving a grading of 94, while ranking 60th nationally and 10th in the point guard position. Scout.com ranked him 61st nationally and 12th in the point guard position, while Rivals.com ranked him 78th nationally and 20th at shooting guard. He was also selected to the 2008, 2009 and 2010 All-Tournament teams at the prestigious State Farm Holiday Classic held in Bloomington-Normal, IL.

College recruiting
Name	Hometown	School	Height	Weight	Commit date
Chasson Randle; PG/SG	Rock Island, IL	Rock Island	6 ft 2 in (1.88 m)	172 lb (78 kg)	Oct 27, 2010
Chasson Randle; PG/SG	Recruit ratings: Scout: Rivals: 247Sports: (94)				
Overall recruit ranking: Scout: 61, 12 (PG) Rivals: 78, 20 (SG) ESPN: 60, 10 (PG)
Note: In many cases, Scout, Rivals, 247Sports, On3, and ESPN may conflict in their listings of height and weight.; In these cases, the average was taken. ESPN grades are on a 100-point scale.; Sources: "2011 Stanford Basketball Commitment List". Rivals.; "2011 Stanford Basketball Recruiting Commits". Scout.; "2011 Stanford Basketball Commits". ESPN.; "Scout.com Team Recruiting Rankings". Scout.; "2011 Team Ranking". Rivals.

== College career ==
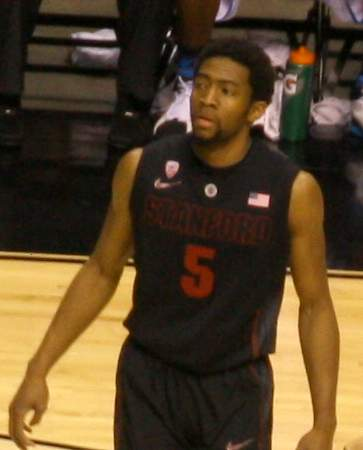
Randle with Stanford in 2014

Randle ultimately chose to play college basketball with Stanford over Illinois and Purdue due to head coach Johnny Dawkins' personal attention during the recruiting process. In his freshman season, Randle averaged 13.8 points per game, was named to the Pac-12 All-Freshman team, and helped lead Stanford to the 2012 National Invitation Tournament title. As a sophomore, Randle averaged 13.6 points and 2.7 assists per game.

Prior to his junior season, Randle was moved to the point guard position, in large part due to an injury to former starter Aaron Bright. He responded well to the move, averaging 18.8 points per game, earning first-team All-Pac-12 Conference and leading Stanford to the Sweet 16 of the 2014 NCAA tournament.

Prior to his senior season, Randle was named to the watch lists for the John R. Wooden and Naismith College Player of the Year awards for national player of the year and the Bob Cousy Award for top college point guard in the country. Randle is also on the mid-season list for 25 Wooden Award finalists. On January 22, 2015, Randle scored his 2,000th career point in a home loss to Arizona. With the mark he became the third player in program history to reach this milestone. At season's end, he was voted first-team All-Pac-12 for the second straight season. Randle was the Pac-12 scholar-athlete of the year in the 2014–15 season. He posted a game-high 25 points in the 2015 NIT Final versus Miami (FL) and earned the tournament's Most Outstanding Player award. Randle, at the time of his graduation, was Stanford's all-time leading scorer with 2,375 points.

== Professional career ==
=== Nymburk (2015–2016) ===
After going undrafted in the 2015 NBA draft, Randle joined the Golden State Warriors for the 2015 NBA Summer League. On July 23, 2015, Randle signed with ČEZ Nymburk of the Czech Republic's National Basketball League (NBL). In 20 NBL games, he averaged 15.3 points, 2.4 rebounds, 2.3 assists and 1.6 steals per game. He helped Nymburk win the 2015–16 NBL championship.

=== Westchester Knicks (2016–2017) ===
In July 2016, Randle joined the New York Knicks for the 2016 NBA Summer League. On August 4, 2016, he signed with the Knicks, but was later waived on October 21, 2016, after appearing in three preseason games. On October 31, 2016, he was acquired by the Westchester Knicks of the NBA Development League as an affiliate player of New York. In 19 games with the Knicks, he averaged 21 points, four rebounds, three assists and one steal in 32 minutes while shooting 40% from three-point range.

=== Philadelphia 76ers / Delaware 87ers (2017) ===
On January 10, 2017, Randle signed a 10-day contract with the Philadelphia 76ers. Four days later, he made his NBA debut in a 109–93 loss to the Washington Wizards, recording three points and one steal in six minutes off the bench. In his second game for the 76ers on January 16, he scored 10 points in a 113–104 win over the Milwaukee Bucks. He signed a second 10-day contract with the 76ers on January 20, and then a three-year deal on January 30. On February 10, he was assigned to the Delaware 87ers for a stint in the D-League. He was recalled by the 76ers the following day. On February 23, he was waived by the 76ers; the team had to clear up a spot on their 15-man roster in order for them to make a trade. Randle averaged 5.3 points in 9.3 minutes in eight appearances for the 76ers.

=== Real Madrid (2017–2018) ===
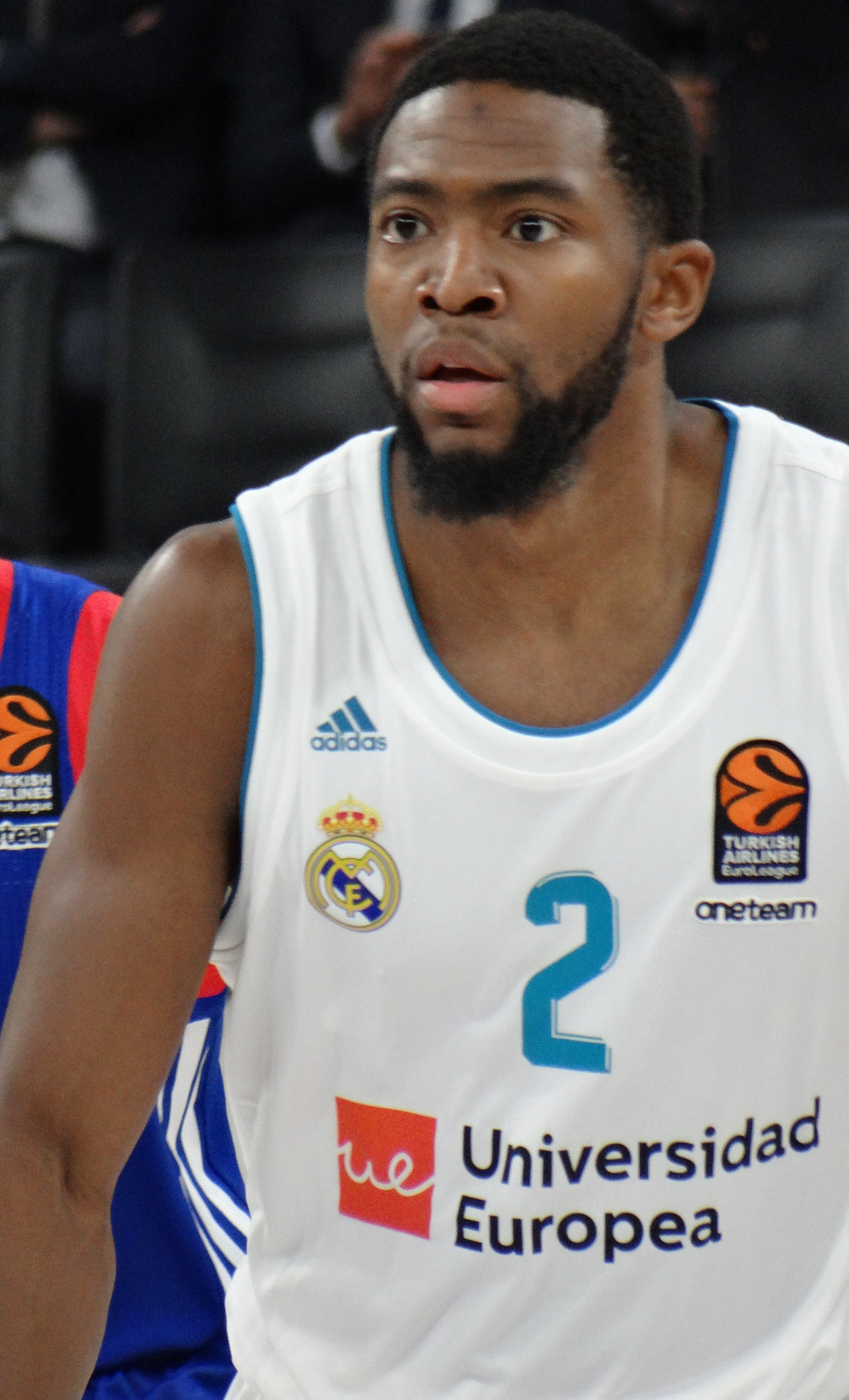
Randle with Real Madrid in 2017

On February 27, 2017, Randle signed with the New York Knicks. Following the Carmelo Anthony trade, he was waived on September 25, 2017.

On October 7, 2017, Randle signed a one-year deal with the Real Madrid. In May 2018, Real Madrid won the 2017–18 EuroLeague championship, after defeating Fenerbahçe Doğuş in the final game 85–80. Over 23 EuroLeague games, Randle averaged 2.6 points and 1 rebound per game.

=== Washington Wizards / Capital City Go-Go (2018–2019) ===
On September 20, 2018, Randle signed with the Washington Wizards for training camp. He was waived by the Wizards on October 14, 2018. He was then added to the training camp roster of the Wizards’ G League affiliate, the Capital City Go-Go. The Wizards re-signed Randle on October 30. He was assigned to the Go-Go for their season opener. Randle was recalled to the Wizards on November 6, 2018, after scoring 37 in the season opener for the Go-Go. On November 12, 2018, the Washington Wizards announced that they had waived Randle via their Twitter account.

On November 15, 2018, the Go-Go announced that they had reacquired Randle.

After clearing a roster spot by trading Austin Rivers and Kelly Oubre Jr., the Wizards re-signed Randle on December 18, 2018.

On February 9, 2019, Randle scored a career-high 20 points in a 134–125 win on the road against the Chicago Bulls.

=== Tianjin Pioneers (2019–2020) ===
On August 14, 2019, Randle signed a contract with the Tianjin Pioneers. On December 24, 2019, Randle had a career-high 44 points against the Shandong Heroes in a loss. Over 24 CBA games, Randle averaged 24.8 points, 3.5 rebounds and 4 assists per game.

=== Golden State Warriors (2020) ===
On March 3, 2020, the Golden State Warriors announced that they had signed Randle to a 10-day contract. However, the NBA coronavirus shutdown occurred while still on contract. Thus, he became a free agent before the resume of the season.

=== Oklahoma City Blue (2021) ===
On January 28, 2021, Randle was included in roster of the Oklahoma City Blue and making his debut on February 11, 2021, with eighteen points, four rebounds and two assists.

=== Orlando / Lakeland Magic (2021) ===
On February 15, 2021, the Orlando Magic announced that they had signed Randle to a two-way contract.

On September 26, 2021, Randle was signed by the Phoenix Suns, but was waived on October 16.

=== New Zealand Breakers (2021–2022) ===
On December 15, 2021, Randle signed with the New Zealand Breakers of the Australian National Basketball League (NBL) as an injury replacement for Peyton Siva. He appeared in just one game – a loss against the Tasmania JackJumpers on December 26 – before Siva returned to action on January 9, 2022, rendering Randle unable to play. Randle remained with the team, and on February 10, he was upgraded to a full roster spot following the release of Jeremiah Martin. In 17 games during the 2021–22 NBL season, he averaged 7.76 points and 1.35 rebounds per game.

=== Grand Rapids Gold (2022–2023) ===
On November 4, 2022, Randle was named to the opening night roster for the Grand Rapids Gold.

=== Return to the Blue (2023) ===
On February 11, 2023, Randle was reacquired by the Oklahoma City Blue.

=== Leones de Ponce (2023) ===
On April 19, 2023, Randle signed with the Leones de Ponce of the Baloncesto Superior Nacional (BSN).

=== AEK Athens (2023–2024) ===
On August 17, 2023, Randle signed a one-year contract with Greek club AEK Athens.

=== Iowa Wolves (2024) ===
On September 27, 2024, Randle signed with the Minnesota Timberwolves, but was waived the next day. On October 25, he joined the Iowa Wolves.

=== Stockton Kings (2024–2025) ===
On December 30, 2024, Randle was traded to the Stockton Kings in a three-team trade involving the Long Island Nets with Iowa receiving Amari Bailey from Long Island and Long Island acquiring Drew Timme from Stockton.

=== APR (2025) ===
On April 23, 2025, Randle signed with APR in Rwanda, whom he joined for the Basketball Africa League (BAL).

=== London Lions (2025-2026) ===
On October 17, 2025, Randle signed a short-term contract with the London Lions while Shavar Reynolds was recovering from injury.

== Personal life ==
The son of Willie and Gwen Randle, he has three sisters: Lakisha, Lamera and Khaliyah.

== Career statistics ==
Legend
GP	Games played	GS	Games started	MPG	Minutes per game
FG%	Field-goal percentage	3P%	3-point field-goal percentage	FT%	Free-throw percentage
RPG	Rebounds per game	APG	Assists per game	SPG	Steals per game
BPG	Blocks per game	PPG	Points per game	PIR	Performance index rating
**Bold**	Career high

=== NBA ===
==== Regular season ====
Year	Team	GP	GS	MPG	FG%	3P%	FT%	RPG	APG	SPG	BPG	PPG
2016–17	Philadelphia	8	0	9.3	**.462**	**.400**	**1.000**	.6	.8	.4	**.1**	5.3
2016–17	New York	18	0	12.5	.389	.312	.935	1.7	1.6	.3	**.1**	5.3
2018–19	Washington	**49**	2	15.2	.419	**.400**	.694	1.1	**2.0**	.5	**.1**	5.5
2019–20	Golden State	3	0	13.3	.000	.000	.833	.7	1.7	**.7**	.0	1.7
2020–21	Orlando	41	**5**	**20.4**	.388	.338	.792	**2.0**	1.8	.5	**.1**	**6.5**
Career		119	7	16.1	.401	.361	.799	1.4	1.8	.5	.1	5.7

=== EuroLeague ===
†	Denotes seasons in which Randle won the EuroLeague

Year	Team	GP	GS	MPG	FG%	3P%	FT%	RPG	APG	SPG	BPG	PPG	PIR
2017–18†	Real Madrid	23	0	7.6	.440	.450	.750	.5	1.0	.2	.0	2.6	1.7
Career		23	0	7.6	.440	.450	.750	.5	1.0	.2	.0	2.6	1.7

=== CBA ===
Year	Team	League	GP	MPG	FG%	3P%	FT%	RPG	APG	SPG	BPG	PPG
2019–20	Tianjin	CBA	24	30.9	.412	.366	.866	3.5	4.0	1.6	.2	24.8
Career			24	30.9	.412	.366	.866	3.5	4.0	1.6	.2	24.8

=== College ===
Year	Team	GP	GS	MPG	FG%	3P%	FT%	RPG	APG	SPG	BPG	PPG
2011–12	Stanford	**37**	36	30.5	.439	**.438**	.761	3.2	2.1	1.1	**.1**	13.8
2012–13	Stanford	34	33	31.0	.399	.359	.784	2.9	2.6	1.1	**.1**	13.6
2013–14	Stanford	36	36	35.1	**.474**	.389	.767	**3.6**	2.1	1.0	**.1**	18.8
2014–15	Stanford	**37**	**37**	**36.4**	.403	.363	**.877**	3.3	**3.0**	**1.4**	**.1**	**19.6**
Career		144	142	33.3	.428	.386	.806	3.3	2.5	1.2	.1	16.5
