= 2012 Match des Champions =

Limoges CSP	Élan Chalon
78	76
- Date: September 20, 2012
- Venue: Palais des Congrès de Paris, Paris
- MVP: (France) Jean-Michel Mipoka

The 2012 Match des Champions was the 7th edition of the annual super cup game in French basketball. This year the reigning LNB Pro A champions Élan Chalon faced off against French Cup champions Limoges CSP.

== Match ==
September 20, 2012
20:30

Boxscore

Élan Chalon	76–78	Limoges CSP
Scoring by quarter: 24–13, 12–20, 16–24, 24–21
Pts: Schilb 23; Rebs: 3 players 5 Asts: 3 players 3		Pts: Wanamaker 23; Rebs: Boungou Colo 7 Asts: Tsamis 3

Palais des Congrès de Paris, Paris

Chalon	Limoges

MVP
(France) Jean-Michel Mipoka
Game rules
Game was played under FIBA rules.

2013 Match des Champions Winners
Limoges CSP
(1st title)
