= Nicolas Lang =

French basketball player (born 1990)

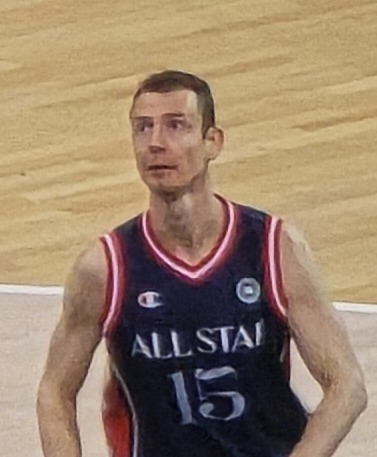

No. 15 – CSP Limoges
- Position: Shooting guard / small forward
- League: LNB Élite

Personal information
- Born: 1 May 1990 (age 36) Mulhouse, France
- Listed height: 1.98 m (6 ft 6 in)
- Listed weight: 90 kg (198 lb)

Career information
- NBA draft: 2012: undrafted
- Playing career: 2007–present

Career history
- 2007–2013: Élan Chalon
- 2013–2015: Paris-Levallois
- 2015–2018: ASVEL Basket
- 2018–2019: SIG Basket
- 2019–present: CSP Limoges

Career highlights
- Pro A All-First Team (2022); 2× Pro A champion (2012, 2016); Leaders Cup winner (2019); 2× French Cup winner (2011, 2012); Semaine des As champion (2012); French Supercup winner (2013); French Supercup MVP (2013); Pro A All-Star (2017)
Medals
Men's basketball
Representing France
U20 European Championship
Gold medal – first place	2010 Croatia	Team

Nicolas Lang (born 1 May 1990) is a French professional basketball player for Limoges of the LNB Élite. Lang is a two-time French Pro A champion, as well as a two-time French Cup winner. On 1 November 2024, Lang hit his 756th three-pointer in league play, becoming the all-time leader on the LNB Pro A list.

== National team career ==
Lang played for the France national U18, U19 and U20 teams. Lang was on the championship team that won the 2010 FIBA Europe Under-20 Championship in Croatia. In 2014, Lang was selected for the pre-selection of the France national team for the 2014 FIBA World Cup. He made his senior national team debut in November 2020.
