= Jean-Michel Mipoka =

French basketball player

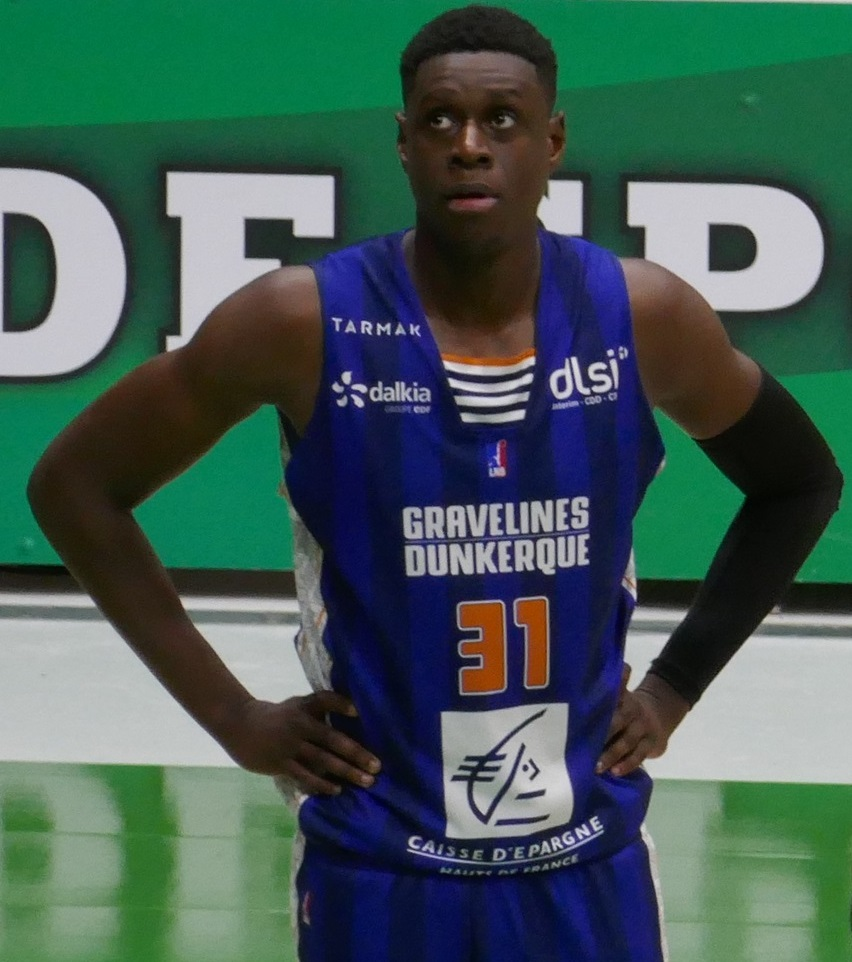

Les Sables Vendée Basket
- Position: Small forward
- League: NM1

Personal information
- Born: 28 September 1985 (age 41) Toulouse, France
- Listed height: 1.98 m (6 ft 6 in)
- Listed weight: 105 kg (231 lb)

Career information
- Playing career: 2003–present

Career history
- 2003–2006: Cholet
- 2006–2007: Olympique Antibes
- 2007–2009: UJAP Quimper 29
- 2009–2010: Saint-Vallier
- 2010–2011: Chorale Roanne
- 2011–2013: Limoges CSP
- 2013–2014: SLUC Nancy
- 2014–2016: Rouen Métropole
- 2016–2017: Élan Béarnais Pau-Orthez
- 2017–2020: BCM Gravelines
- 2020–2022: Fos Provence Basket
- 2022–2023: Orléans Loiret
- 2023–present: Les Sables Vendée Basket

Career highlights
- 2× Pro B champion (2012, 2021); Match des Champions (2012); Match des Champions MVP (2012)

Jean-Michel Mipoka (born 28 September 1985) is a French-Congolese professional basketball player for Les Sables Vendée Basket of the NM1.

He formerly played for BCM Gravelines of the LNB Pro A.

== Professional career ==
Mipoka started his pro career with Cholet Basket of the LNB Pro A.

From 2006 to 2010 he played with Olympique Antibes, UJAP Quimper 29 and Saint-Vallier in the LNB Pro B.

In June 2010, he signed with Chorale Roanne Basket for the 2010–11 season.

From 2011 to 2013 he played with Limoges CSP. In June 2013, he signed with SLUC Nancy Basket for the 2013–14 season.

In July 2014, he signed with Rouen Métropole Basket, for the 2014–15 season.

== National team career ==
Mipoka has been a member of the Republic of the Congo men's national basketball team.
