= 2019 NBA Awards =

Basketball awards show

2019 NBA Awards on TNT
- Date: June 24, 2019
- Location: Barker Hangar, Santa Monica, California
- Country: United States
- Hosted by: Shaquille O'Neal
- Website: www.nba.com/nbaawards

Television/radio coverage
- Network: TNT
- Produced by: Dick Clark Productions

The 2019 NBA Awards were the 3rd annual awards show by the National Basketball Association (NBA), held on June 24, 2019, at Barker Hangar in Santa Monica, California and hosted by Shaquille O'Neal.

This is currently the last edition of the NBA Awards show. In future seasons, award winners were announced throughout TNT's coverage of the playoffs.

== Winners and finalists ==
The full list of finalists were announced on May 17, 2019.

Winners are in boldface.

**NBA Most Valuable Player Award**: **Giannis Antetokounmpo — Milwaukee Bucks**; Paul George — Oklahoma City Thunder; James Harden — Houston Rockets	**NBA Rookie of the Year Award**: **Luka Dončić — Dallas Mavericks**; Deandre Ayton — Phoenix Suns; Trae Young — Atlanta Hawks
**NBA Defensive Player of the Year Award**: **Rudy Gobert — Utah Jazz**; Giannis Antetokounmpo — Milwaukee Bucks; Paul George — Oklahoma City Thunder	**NBA Sixth Man of the Year Award**: **Louis Williams — Los Angeles Clippers**; Montrezl Harrell — Los Angeles Clippers; Domantas Sabonis — Indiana Pacers
**NBA Most Improved Player Award**: **Pascal Siakam — Toronto Raptors**; De'Aaron Fox — Sacramento Kings; D'Angelo Russell — Brooklyn Nets	**NBA Coach of the Year Award**: **Mike Budenholzer — Milwaukee Bucks**; Michael Malone — Denver Nuggets; Doc Rivers — Los Angeles Clippers
**Twyman–Stokes Teammate of the Year Award**: **Mike Conley — Memphis Grizzlies**; Steven Adams — Oklahoma City Thunder; Jared Dudley — Brooklyn Nets; Channing Frye — Cleveland Cavaliers; Rudy Gay — San Antonio Spurs; Udonis Haslem — Miami Heat; Andre Iguodala — Golden State Warriors; Kyle Korver — Utah Jazz; Khris Middleton — Milwaukee Bucks; JJ Redick — Philadelphia 76ers; Garrett Temple — Los Angeles Clippers; Thaddeus Young — Indiana Pacers	**NBA Cares Community Assist Award**: **Bradley Beal — Washington Wizards**; Jarrett Allen — Brooklyn Nets; Mike Conley — Memphis Grizzlies; Tobias Harris — Philadelphia 76ers; LeBron James — Los Angeles Lakers; Damian Lillard — Portland Trail Blazers; Khris Middleton — Milwaukee Bucks; Donovan Mitchell — Utah Jazz; Dwight Powell — Dallas Mavericks; Pascal Siakam — Toronto Raptors
**NBA Sportsmanship Award**: **Mike Conley — Memphis Grizzlies**; Steven Adams — Oklahoma City Thunder; Harrison Barnes — Sacramento Kings; Al Horford — Boston Celtics; Khris Middleton — Milwaukee Bucks; Kemba Walker — Charlotte Hornets	**NBA Lifetime Achievement Award**: **Larry Bird — Boston Celtics**; **Magic Johnson — Los Angeles Lakers**
**NBA Hustle Award**: **Marcus Smart — Boston Celtics**	**NBA Executive of the Year Award**: **Jon Horst — Milwaukee Bucks**
**Sager Strong Award**: **Robin Roberts**

== Honors ==
The NBA All-Rookie Teams were announced on May 21, 2019. It was followed by the announcements for the NBA All-Defensive Teams on May 22, 2019 and the All-NBA Teams on May 23, 2019.

=== NBA All-Rookie Team ===
First team		Second team	
Luka Dončić	Dallas Mavericks	Shai Gilgeous-Alexander	Los Angeles Clippers
Trae Young	Atlanta Hawks	Collin Sexton	Cleveland Cavaliers
Deandre Ayton	Phoenix Suns	Landry Shamet	Los Angeles Clippers
Jaren Jackson Jr.	Memphis Grizzlies	Mitchell Robinson	New York Knicks
Marvin Bagley III	Sacramento Kings	Kevin Huerter	Atlanta Hawks

=== NBA All-Defensive Team ===
First team		Second team	
Rudy Gobert	Utah Jazz	Jrue Holiday	New Orleans Pelicans
Paul George	Oklahoma City Thunder	Klay Thompson	Golden State Warriors
Giannis Antetokounmpo	Milwaukee Bucks	Joel Embiid	Philadelphia 76ers
Marcus Smart	Boston Celtics	Draymond Green	Golden State Warriors
Eric Bledsoe	Milwaukee Bucks	Kawhi Leonard	Toronto Raptors

=== All NBA Team ===
First team		Second team		Third Team	
Giannis Antetokounmpo	Milwaukee Bucks	Kevin Durant	Golden State Warriors	Blake Griffin	Detroit Pistons
Paul George	Oklahoma City Thunder	Kawhi Leonard	Toronto Raptors	LeBron James	Los Angeles Lakers
Nikola Jokić	Denver Nuggets	Joel Embiid	Philadelphia 76ers	Rudy Gobert	Utah Jazz
James Harden	Houston Rockets	Damian Lillard	Portland Trail Blazers	Russell Westbrook	Oklahoma City Thunder
Stephen Curry	Golden State Warriors	Kyrie Irving	Boston Celtics	Kemba Walker	Charlotte Hornets

== See also ==
- List of National Basketball Association awards
