= 2018 NBA Awards =

North American basketball awards show

2018 NBA Awards on TNT
- Date: June 25, 2018
- Location: Barker Hangar, Santa Monica, California
- Country: United States
- Hosted by: Main host Anthony Anderson; Inside the NBA crew Ernie Johnson Jr. Shaquille O'Neal; Kenny Smith; Charles Barkley
- Website: www.nba.com/nbaawards

Television/radio coverage
- Network: TNT
- Viewership: 1.21 million
- Produced by: Dick Clark Productions

The 2018 NBA Awards were the 2nd annual awards show by the National Basketball Association (NBA), held on June 25, 2018, at Barker Hangar in Santa Monica, California and hosted by Anthony Anderson. James Harden of the Houston Rockets was awarded the NBA Most Valuable Player Award.

During the ceremony, it was revealed during EJ's Neat-O Stat of the Night that the cover athlete of NBA Live 19 will be Joel Embiid.

== Winners and finalists ==
The full list of finalists was announced on May 16, 2018 during the TNT NBA Tip-Off pre-game show and posted to Twitter.

Winners are in boldface.

**NBA Most Valuable Player Award**: **James Harden — Houston Rockets**; Anthony Davis — New Orleans Pelicans; LeBron James — Cleveland Cavaliers	**NBA Rookie of the Year Award**: **Ben Simmons — Philadelphia 76ers**; Donovan Mitchell — Utah Jazz; Jayson Tatum — Boston Celtics
**NBA Defensive Player of the Year Award**: **Rudy Gobert — Utah Jazz**; Joel Embiid — Philadelphia 76ers; Anthony Davis — New Orleans Pelicans	**NBA Sixth Man of the Year Award**: **Lou Williams — Los Angeles Clippers**; Fred VanVleet — Toronto Raptors; Eric Gordon — Houston Rockets
**NBA Most Improved Player Award**: **Victor Oladipo — Indiana Pacers**; Clint Capela — Houston Rockets; Spencer Dinwiddie — Brooklyn Nets	**NBA Coach of the Year Award**: **Dwane Casey — Toronto Raptors**; Brad Stevens — Boston Celtics; Quin Snyder — Utah Jazz
**Twyman–Stokes Teammate of the Year Award**: **Jamal Crawford — Minnesota Timberwolves**	**NBA Hustle Award**: **Amir Johnson — Philadelphia 76ers**
**NBA Sportsmanship Award**: **Kemba Walker — Charlotte Hornets**	**NBA Lifetime Achievement Award**: **Oscar Robertson — Milwaukee Bucks**
**NBA Cares Community Assist Award**: **Kevin Durant — Golden State Warriors**	**NBA Executive of the Year Award**: **Daryl Morey — Houston Rockets**
**Sager Strong Award**: **Dikembe Mutombo**

== Honors ==
=== NBA All-Defensive Team ===
First team		Second team	
Rudy Gobert	Utah Jazz	Joel Embiid	Philadelphia 76ers
Anthony Davis	New Orleans Pelicans	Draymond Green	Golden State Warriors
Victor Oladipo	Indiana Pacers	Al Horford	Boston Celtics
Jrue Holiday	New Orleans Pelicans	Dejounte Murray	San Antonio Spurs
Robert Covington	Philadelphia 76ers	Jimmy Butler	Minnesota Timberwolves

=== NBA All-Rookie Team ===
First team		Second team	
Donovan Mitchell	Utah Jazz	Dennis Smith Jr.	Dallas Mavericks
Ben Simmons	Philadelphia 76ers	Lonzo Ball	Los Angeles Lakers
Jayson Tatum	Boston Celtics	John Collins	Atlanta Hawks
Kyle Kuzma	Los Angeles Lakers	Bogdan Bogdanović	Sacramento Kings
Lauri Markkanen	Chicago Bulls	Josh Jackson	Phoenix Suns

== Fan Awards ==
Fan Awards nominees and categories were announced on the league's official website on April 18, 2018.

Winners are in boldface.

**Dunk of the Year**: **Giannis Antetokounmpo — Milwaukee Bucks**; DeMar DeRozan — Toronto Raptors; LeBron James — Cleveland Cavaliers; Donovan Mitchell — Utah Jazz; Larry Nance Jr. — Cleveland Cavaliers	**Clutch Shot of the Year**: **LeBron James — Cleveland Cavaliers**; Devin Booker — Phoenix Suns; Damian Lillard — Portland Trail Blazers; Terry Rozier — Boston Celtics; Andrew Wiggins — Minnesota Timberwolves
**Assist of the Year**: **LeBron James — Cleveland Cavaliers**; Kyle Anderson — San Antonio Spurs; Giannis Antetokounmpo — Milwaukee Bucks; Ben Simmons — Philadelphia 76ers; Miloš Teodosić — Los Angeles Clippers	**Block of the Year**: **Anthony Davis — New Orleans Pelicans**; Bam Adebayo — Miami Heat; Giannis Antetokounmpo — Milwaukee Bucks; Marquese Chriss — Phoenix Suns; Kristaps Porziņģis — New York Knicks
**Handle of the Year**: **Kyrie Irving — Boston Celtics**; James Harden — Houston Rockets; Josh Jackson — Phoenix Suns; Kemba Walker — Charlotte Hornets; Chris Paul — Houston Rockets	**Best Style**: **Russell Westbrook — Oklahoma City Thunder**; James Harden — Houston Rockets; LeBron James — Cleveland Cavaliers; Kyle Kuzma — Los Angeles Lakers; Nick Young — Golden State Warriors
**Play of the Year**: **Clutch Shot of the Year – LeBron James — Cleveland Cavaliers**; Dunk of the Year – Giannis Antetokounmpo — Milwaukee Bucks; Assist of the Year – LeBron James — Cleveland Cavaliers; Block of the Year – Anthony Davis — New Orleans Pelicans; Handle of the Year – Kyrie Irving — Boston Celtics

== Performances ==
- Travis Scott: "Watch", "Butterfly Effect", "Goosebumps"

== See also ==
- List of National Basketball Association awards
