= 2017 NBA Awards =

2017 NBA Awards on TNT
- Date: June 26, 2017
- Location: Basketball City at Pier 36, New York City, New York
- Country: United States
- Hosted by: Main host Drake; Inside the NBA crew Ernie Johnson Jr. Shaquille O'Neal; Kenny Smith; Charles Barkley
- Website: www.nba.com/nbaawards

Television/radio coverage
- Network: TNT
- Viewership: 1.79 million
- Produced by: Dick Clark Productions

The 2017 NBA Awards were the inaugural awards show by the National Basketball Association (NBA), held on June 26, 2017, at Basketball City at Pier 36 in New York City, New York, and hosted by musician Drake.

== Winners and finalists ==
Winners are in boldface.

**NBA Most Valuable Player Award**: **Russell Westbrook — Oklahoma City Thunder**; James Harden — Houston Rockets; Kawhi Leonard — San Antonio Spurs	**NBA Rookie of the Year Award**: **Malcolm Brogdon — Milwaukee Bucks**; Joel Embiid — Philadelphia 76ers; Dario Šarić — Philadelphia 76ers
**NBA Most Improved Player Award**: **Giannis Antetokounmpo — Milwaukee Bucks**; Rudy Gobert — Utah Jazz; Nikola Jokić — Denver Nuggets	**NBA Defensive Player of the Year Award**: **Draymond Green — Golden State Warriors**; Rudy Gobert — Utah Jazz; Kawhi Leonard — San Antonio Spurs
**NBA Sixth Man of the Year Award**: **Eric Gordon — Houston Rockets**; Andre Iguodala — Golden State Warriors; Lou Williams — Houston Rockets	**NBA Coach of the Year Award**: **Mike D'Antoni — Houston Rockets**; Gregg Popovich — San Antonio Spurs; Erik Spoelstra — Miami Heat
**Twyman–Stokes Teammate of the Year Award**: **Dirk Nowitzki — Dallas Mavericks**	**NBA Hustle Award**: **Patrick Beverley — Houston Rockets**
**NBA Sportsmanship Award**: **Kemba Walker — Charlotte Hornets**	**NBA Lifetime Achievement Award**: **Bill Russell — Boston Celtics**
**NBA Cares Community Assist Award**: **Isaiah Thomas — Boston Celtics**	**NBA Executive of the Year Award**: **Bob Myers — Golden State Warriors**
**Sager Strong Award**: **Monty Williams — San Antonio Spurs**

== Honors ==
=== NBA All-Defensive Team ===
First team		Second team	
Draymond Green	Golden State Warriors	Tony Allen	Memphis Grizzlies
Rudy Gobert	Utah Jazz	Danny Green	San Antonio Spurs
Kawhi Leonard	San Antonio Spurs	Anthony Davis	New Orleans Pelicans
Chris Paul	Los Angeles Clippers	André Roberson	Oklahoma City Thunder
Patrick Beverley	Houston Rockets	Giannis Antetokounmpo	Milwaukee Bucks

=== NBA All-Rookie Team ===
First team		Second team	
Malcolm Brogdon	Milwaukee Bucks	Jamal Murray	Denver Nuggets
Dario Šarić	Philadelphia 76ers	Jaylen Brown	Boston Celtics
Joel Embiid	Philadelphia 76ers	Marquese Chriss	Phoenix Suns
Buddy Hield	Sacramento Kings	Brandon Ingram	Los Angeles Lakers
Willy Hernangómez	New York Knicks	Yogi Ferrell	Dallas Mavericks

== Fan Awards ==
Fan Awards are fan-voted categories in which voting is done online on the league's official website and using social media hashtags.

Winners are in boldface.

**Best Style**: **Russell Westbrook — Oklahoma City Thunder**; Iman Shumpert — Cleveland Cavaliers; Dwyane Wade — Chicago Bulls	**Assist of the Year**: **Draymond Green / Stephen Curry / Kevin Durant — Golden State Warriors**; Nikola Jokić — Denver Nuggets; Chris Paul — Los Angeles Clippers
**Block of the Year**: **Kawhi Leonard — San Antonio Spurs**; Kristaps Porziņģis — New York Knicks; Hassan Whiteside — Miami Heat	**Dunk of the Year**: **Victor Oladipo — Oklahoma City Thunder**; Larry Nance Jr. — Los Angeles Lakers; Zach LaVine — Minnesota Timberwolves
**Game Winner of the Year**: **Russell Westbrook — Oklahoma City Thunder**; Kyrie Irving — Cleveland Cavaliers; Tyler Ulis — Phoenix Suns	**Performance of the Year**: **Klay Thompson — Golden State Warriors**; Devin Booker — Phoenix Suns; James Harden — Houston Rockets; Russell Westbrook — Oklahoma City Thunder
**Best Playoff Moment**: **Kevin Durant — Golden State Warriors**; Isaiah Thomas — Boston Celtics; John Wall — Washington Wizards

== Performances ==
Artist(s)	Song(s)
2 Chainz	"Realize" (with Nicki Minaj)
Nicki Minaj	"No Frauds", "Swish Swish" (verse)

== See also ==
- List of National Basketball Association awards
