= Nikola Jokić =

Serbian basketball player (born 1995)

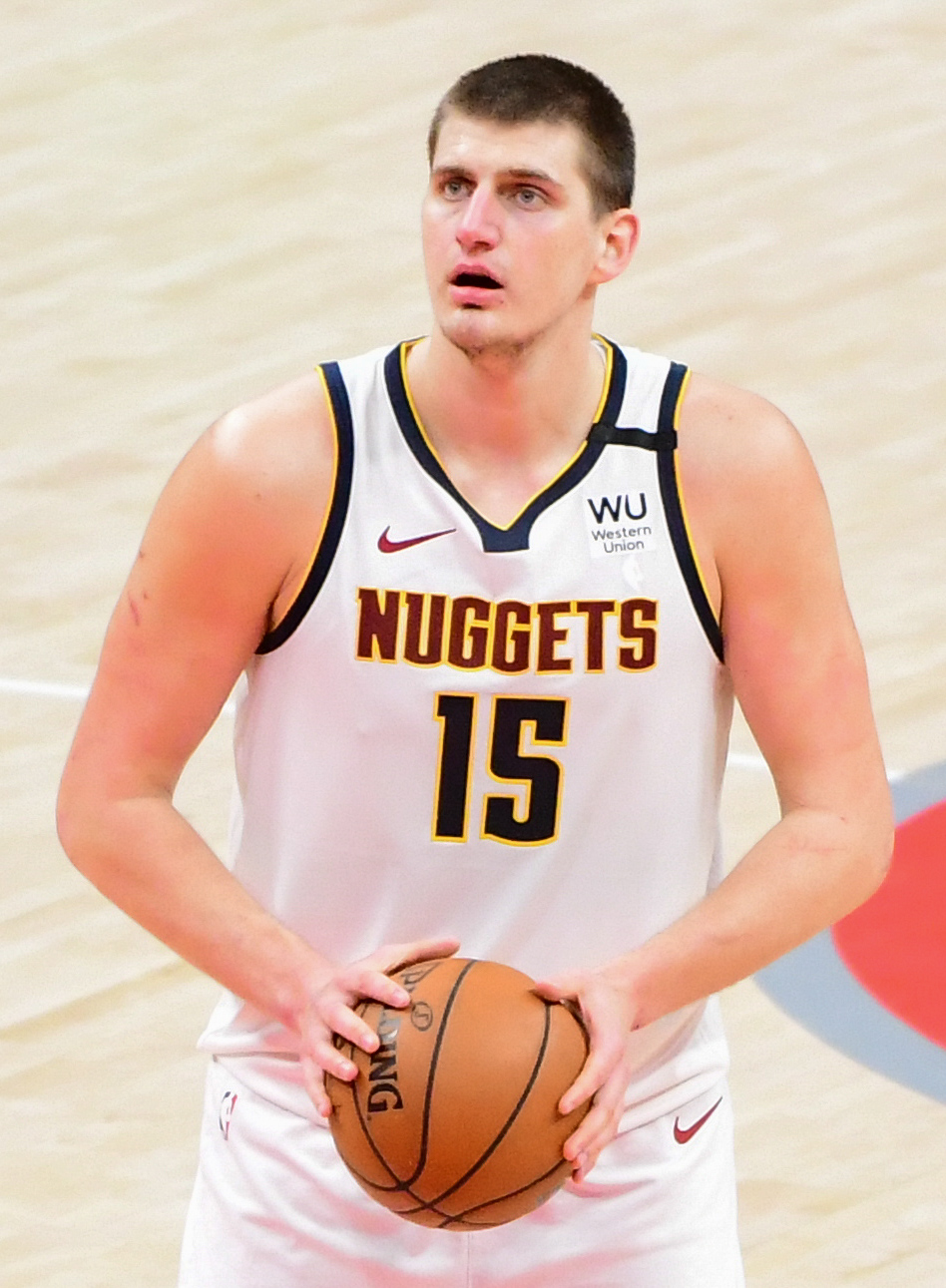
- Jokić with the Denver Nuggets in 2020

No. 15 – Denver Nuggets
- Position: Center
- League: NBA

Personal information
- Born: February 19, 1995 (age 31) Sombor, Serbia, FR Yugoslavia
- Listed height: 6 ft 11 in (2.11 m)
- Listed weight: 284 lb (129 kg)

Career information
- NBA draft: 2014: 2nd round, 41st overall pick
- Drafted by: Denver Nuggets
- Playing career: 2012–present

Career history
- 2012–2015: Mega Basket
- 2015–present: Denver Nuggets

Career highlights
- NBA champion (2023); NBA Finals MVP (2023); 3× NBA Most Valuable Player (2021, 2022, 2024); 8× NBA All-Star (2019–2026); 6× All-NBA First Team (2019, 2021, 2022, 2024–2026); 2× All-NBA Second Team (2020, 2023); NBA rebounding leader (2026); NBA assists leader (2026); NBA Western Conference finals MVP (2023); NBA All-Rookie First Team (2016); 5× Serbian Player of the Year (2018, 2021, 2022, 2024, 2025); ABA League MVP (2015); ABA League Top Prospect (2015)
- Stats at NBA.com
- Stats at Basketball Reference
Medals
Men's basketball
Representing Serbia
Olympic Games
Silver medal – second place	2016 Rio de Janeiro	Team
Bronze medal – third place	2024 Paris	Team
U19 World Championship
Silver medal – second place	2013 Czech Republic	Team

Nikola Jokić (/ˈjoʊkɪtʃ/ YOH-kitch; Serbian Cyrillic: Никола Јокић [nǐkola jôkitɕ]; born February 19, 1995) is a Serbian professional basketball player who is a center for the Denver Nuggets of the National Basketball Association (NBA). Nicknamed "Joker", he is widely regarded as one of the greatest players of all time. Jokić is an eight-time NBA All-Star, eight-time All-NBA Team member (including six first-team selections) and a three-time NBA Most Valuable Player (MVP). He represents the Serbian national team, with which he won a silver medal at the 2016 Summer Olympics, and a bronze medal at the 2024 Summer Olympics.

Often considered the greatest draft steal in NBA history, Jokić was selected 41st overall by the Nuggets in the second round of the 2014 NBA draft. He was named to the NBA All-Rookie First Team in 2016. In the 2018–19 NBA season, while leading the Nuggets to the Western Conference Semifinals, Jokić earned his first All-Star and All-NBA First Team selections. The following season, he led the Nuggets to the Western Conference Finals. In the 2020–21 NBA season and 2021–22 NBA season, Jokić won back-to-back NBA Most Valuable Player Awards. In the 2022–23 NBA season, he finished second in MVP voting and was named NBA Finals MVP after leading the Nuggets to their first-ever NBA championship. The following season, Jokić won his third NBA Most Valuable Player Award. In the 2024–25 NBA season, he finished second in MVP voting while averaging a triple-double with 29.6 points, 12.7 rebounds, and 10.2 assists per game. The following season, Jokić averaged a triple-double for a second consecutive year with 27.7 points, 12.9 rebounds, and 10.7 assists per game, finishing second in MVP voting again. He also became the first player in NBA history to lead the league in both rebounds and assists per game in the same season.

Jokić is only the third player in NBA history to finish top 2 in MVP voting for six straight years. He is only the third player in NBA history to average a triple-double in a season and only the second player in NBA history to average a triple-double in multiple seasons. Jokić is second all-time among NBA players with the most triple-doubles and holds the record for the fastest triple-double (achieved in 14 minutes and 33 seconds). He is the only NBA player ever to achieve a 30+ points, 20+ rebounds, and 20+ assists game. Jokić is the lowest drafted player to win either the NBA Most Valuable Player Award or the NBA Finals Most Valuable Player Award.

== Early life and education ==
Jokić is an ethnic Serb born in the city of Sombor in the northern part of Serbia. He grew up in a two-bedroom apartment that housed him, his two brothers, parents, and grandmother. He attended Dositej Obradović Primary School. His father was an agricultural engineer. Jokić developed a love of basketball early in his life playing with his two older brothers, Strahinja and Nemanja, who were a decade older. Both brothers played basketball in Serbia with Nemanja later playing college basketball for Detroit Mercy and C.W. Post and for Scranton/Wilkes-Barre Steamers in the Premier Basketball League. The brothers are friends with former NBA player Darko Miličić. Jokić also loved harness racing as a child and competed as an amateur, a passion that he still has today.

== Professional career ==
=== Mega Basket (2012–2015) ===
Jokić played youth basketball for Vojvodina Srbijagas, drawing attention when he had achieved a total index rating greater than 50 in two consecutive games. In December 2012, Jokić signed a contract with Mega Vizura, although in the first season with the team he played mostly for their junior team in 2012–13. At the age of 17, Jokić appeared in five games of the Serbian League and averaged 1.8 points and 2.0 rebounds in 10.2 minutes per game. In February 2013, he officially signed a four-year contract with the team.

In the 2013–14 season, Jokić saw more minutes on the court for the senior team. Over 25 Adriatic League games, he averaged 11.4 points, 6.4 rebounds and 2.5 assists per game. Jokić also played 13 games with the team in the Serbian League and had similar production, averaging 10.9 points, 6.0 rebounds, and 3.3 assists per game.

==== 2014–15 season: ABA League MVP and rebounding title ====
On June 26, 2014, Jokić was selected by the Denver Nuggets with the 41st overall pick in the 2014 NBA draft. On the ESPN telecast, his selection was announced on a news ticker near the bottom of the screen and was famously overshadowed by a Taco Bell commercial which aired above it simultaneously. In the first game of the Adriatic League, Jokić led his team to a 103–98 victory over MZT Skopje, by scoring 27 points and grabbing 15 rebounds for a total index rating of 44. On November 3, Jokić recorded 17 points, 12 rebounds and season-high eight assists for a total index rating of 40, in a 90–84 victory over Zadar. On February 7, 2015, he scored 27 points and grabbed 15 rebounds in an 88–77 loss to Szolnoki Olaj. On March 21, Jokić scored a season-high 28 points and added 15 rebounds to help his team win 100–96 over Igokea. Although Mega Leks finished in 10th place in the Adriatic League, Jokić became one of the league's most valuable players.

On June 8, 2015, Jokić scored 23 points in a loss to Crvena Zvezda in the playoff semifinals of the Serbian League. He averaged 18.4 points, 10.4 rebounds and 2.7 assists per game in the Serbian League. In the 2014–15 ABA League, Jokić averaged 15.4 points, league-leading 9.3 rebounds and 3.5 assists per game, while leading the league with an index rating of 22. He was named MVP four times over the course of the season: for Round 1, Round 6, Round 21 Round 26 and was named MVP for February. On March 26, 2015, Jokić was officially named the Adriatic League regular season MVP. He was also named the ABA League Top Prospect for the 2014–15 season. On June 9, Jokić parted ways with the team to pursue an NBA career.

=== Denver Nuggets (2015–present) ===
==== 2015–16 season: All-Rookie honors ====
In the summer of 2015, Jokić joined the Denver Nuggets, one season after being drafted. On July 28, 2015, he signed a contract with the Nuggets after averaging 8.0 points and 6.2 rebounds in five summer league games for the team. On November 18, Jokić had a then season-best game with 23 points and 12 rebounds in a 109–98 loss to the San Antonio Spurs. On January 10, 2016, he recorded a then career-high nine assists in a 95–92 victory over the Charlotte Hornets. On February 1, he recorded career highs of 27 points and 14 rebounds in a 112–93 win over the Toronto Raptors. On April 8, Jokić set a new career high with 15 rebounds in a 102–98 victory over the San Antonio Spurs. At the end of the season, he finished third in the 2016 NBA Rookie of the Year Award voting and earned NBA All-Rookie First Team honors.

==== 2016–17 season: Improving as a sophomore ====
On October 29, 2016, Jokić recorded 23 points and a then career-high 17 rebounds in a 115–113 overtime loss to the Portland Trail Blazers. After starting the first eight games of the season, Jokić was moved to the bench on November 12. He remained coming off the bench for the next 14 games. During that stretch as a bench player, Jokić had a season-high 27 points and 11 rebounds in a 112–92 loss against the Dallas Mavericks on December 12. Three days later, he was reinserted into the starting lineup, and the Nuggets scored 132 points in a victory over the Portland Trail Blazers with Jokić acting as the fulcrum of the offense, passing out of the high post and short rolling to the rim. Fans subsequently began referring to December 15 as "Jokmas" in celebration of the team's decision to build around Jokić rather than Jusuf Nurkić or first-round pick Emmanuel Mudiay. Jokić recorded a then career-high 11 assists in a 105–103 victory over the Minnesota Timberwolves. On January 16, 2017, he scored a then career-high 30 points in a 125–112 victory over the Orlando Magic. Jokić surpassed that mark three days later, scoring 35 points in a 118–104 loss to the San Antonio Spurs. On February 3, he recorded his first career triple-double with 20 points, 13 rebounds and 11 assists in a 121–117 victory over the Milwaukee Bucks. Exactly a week later, Jokić scored a then career-high 40 points to lead the Nuggets to a 131–123 victory over the New York Knicks. He went 17 of 23 from the field and added nine rebounds and five assists. On February 13, Jokić set career highs with 12 assists and 21 rebounds to go with 17 points in his second career triple-double in a 132–110 victory over the Golden State Warriors.

On February 28, 2017, Jokić recorded his third career triple-double with 19 points, 16 rebounds and 10 assists in a 125–107 victory over the Chicago Bulls. The following night, he had his second straight triple-double and fourth of his career—all within 13 games. Jokić finished with 13 points, 14 rebounds, and 10 assists in a 110–98 victory over the Milwaukee Bucks. On March 16, he recorded his fifth triple-double of the season with 17 points, 14 rebounds, and 11 assists in a 129–114 victory over the Los Angeles Clippers. On March 31, Jokić recorded his sixth triple-double of the season with 26 points, 13 rebounds, and 10 assists in a 122–114 loss to the Charlotte Hornets. He finished the season with a 29-point, 16-rebound, eight-assist effort in a 111–105 season-finale victory over the Oklahoma City Thunder on April 12. Jokić's six triple-doubles ranked fourth on the season behind Russell Westbrook (42), James Harden (22), and LeBron James (13). At the end of the season, Jokić finished second in the 2017 NBA Most Improved Player Award voting, as well as in the 2017 Assist of the Year voting.

==== 2017–18 season: Franchise player ====
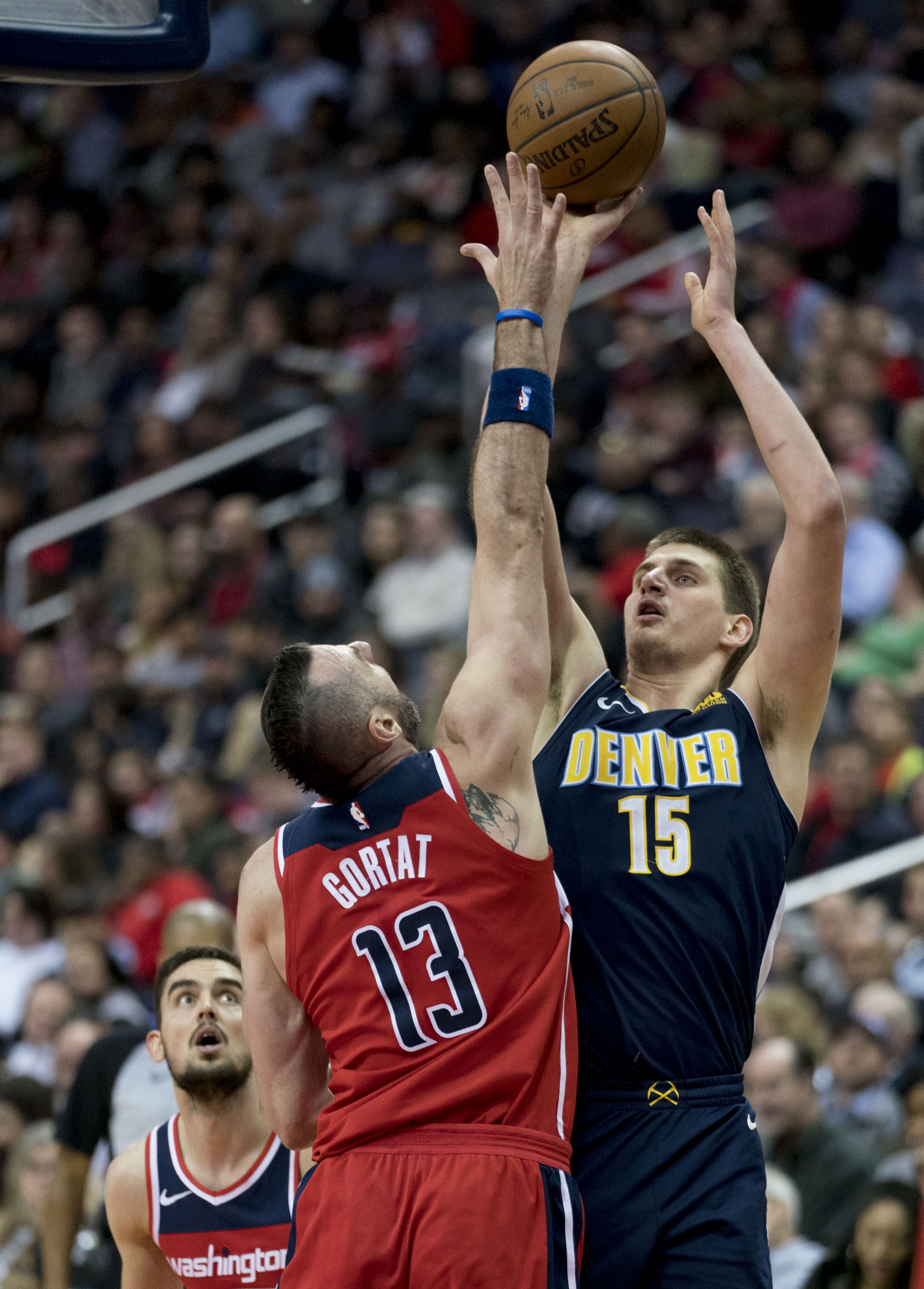
Jokić in 2018

On November 7, 2017, Jokić scored a then career-high 41 points in a 112–104 win over the Brooklyn Nets. Six days later, he was named Western Conference Player of the Week for games played from November 6 to November 12. Jokić became the 17th Nugget in franchise history to earn Player of the Week honors and the first since Ty Lawson in March 2013. Jokić had a seven-game absence with a left ankle sprain in early December. On January 8, 2018, he had his first triple-double of the season with 22 points, 12 rebounds, and 11 assists in a 124–114 loss to the Golden State Warriors. On February 15, in a 134–123 victory over the Milwaukee Bucks, Jokić recorded 30 points, 15 rebounds and a then career-high 17 assists, reaching a triple-double with 1:54 remaining in the second quarter. He recorded the quickest triple-double in NBA history in 14 minutes and 33 seconds, besting Jim Tucker's previous record of 17 minutes from 1955. Eight days later, he recorded his third straight triple-double with 28 points, 11 rebounds, and 11 assists in a 122–119 victory over the San Antonio Spurs.

On March 15, Jokić recorded his eighth triple-double of the season with 23 points, 12 rebounds, and 10 assists in a 120–113 victory over the Detroit Pistons, thus setting the most triple-doubles by a Nuggets player in a season since Fat Lever had nine in 1988–89. On April 1, he had 35 points and 13 rebounds in a 128–125 overtime victory over the Bucks. Eight days later, he was named Western Conference Player of the Week for games played from April 2 to April 8, thus earning his second Player of the Week nod for the season. Later that day, Jokić recorded 15 points, a season-best 20 rebounds, and 11 assists in an 88–82 victory over the Portland Trail Blazers, thus securing his 16th career triple-double and his tenth of the season. In the Nuggets' regular season finale on April 11, Jokić recorded 35 points and 10 rebounds in a 112–106 overtime loss to the Minnesota Timberwolves. It was his seventh 30-point game of the season. The loss ruled the Nuggets out of the playoffs with a 46–36 record. It was the first final-day play-in game in the NBA in 21 years, with Minnesota also vying for a spot in the playoffs.

==== 2018–19 season: Breakout season, first All-Star and All-NBA appearances ====
On July 9, 2018, Jokić signed a five-year, $148 million maximum contract extension with the Nuggets. On October 20, in the second game of the season, Jokić recorded 35 points, 12 rebounds, and 11 assists in a 119–91 victory over the Phoenix Suns. He joined Wilt Chamberlain as the only players in NBA history to post a triple-double with 30 or more points without missing a field goal—Chamberlain did it twice, in 1966 and 1967. Jokić also became just the second Nugget to record a triple-double in the first two games of the season, joining Fat Lever. Jokić went on to earn Western Conference Player of the Week honors for the first week of the season, becoming the sixth player in franchise history to win the award three or more times, joining Alex English, Dikembe Mutombo, Carmelo Anthony, Allen Iverson and Chauncey Billups. On November 3, Jokić had a season-high 16 assists and 10 rebounds to go along with seven points in a 103–88 victory over the Utah Jazz. Six days later, he had a season-high 37 points and tied his career best with 21 rebounds in a 112–110 loss against the Brooklyn Nets. For his efforts in 2018, Jokić was recognized as the Serbian Player of the Year by the Basketball Federation of Serbia.

On January 5, 2019, Jokić scored a then season-high 39 points, along with 12 rebounds, six assists, and three steals in a 123–110 victory over the Charlotte Hornets. His second Player of the Week honor came for games played from December 31 to January 6. On January 8, Jokić had his fourth triple-double of the season with 29 points, 11 rebounds, and 10 assists in a 103–99 win over the Miami Heat. It was the 20th triple-double of his NBA career. At age 23, Jokić became the third-youngest player to reach 20 triple-doubles; Oscar Robertson and Magic Johnson were both 22 at the time of their 20th. Two days later, he had 18 points, 14 rebounds and 10 assists in a 121–100 victory over the Los Angeles Clippers. On January 13, Jokić scored a season-high 40 points in 116–113 victory over the Portland Trail Blazers. Six days later, he had his sixth triple-double of the season with 19 points, 12 assists and 11 rebounds in a 124–102 victory over the Cleveland Cavaliers. It was Jokić's 22nd career triple-double, thus passing Kareem Abdul-Jabbar to move to second place on the NBA all-time triple-doubles list by a 7-footer. On January 23, he recorded 28 points and 21 rebounds in a 114–108 loss to the Jazz. Four days later, after serving a one-game suspension for leaving the bench during an on-court fracas against the Jazz, Jokić recorded his seventh triple-double with 32 points, 18 rebounds and 10 assists in a 126–110 victory over the Philadelphia 76ers. On January 31, Jokić received his first All-Star selection as a Western Conference reserve for the 2019 NBA All-Star Game, becoming the Nuggets' first All-Star since Anthony in 2011. Six days later, Jokić recorded his 10th triple-double of the season with 25 points, 14 rebounds, and 10 assists in a 135–130 loss to the Nets. On February 13, Jokić recorded his 12th triple-double of the season with 20 points, 18 rebounds, and 11 assists, while also tipping in the game winning shot with 0.3 seconds remaining to lift the Nuggets to a 120–118 victory over the Sacramento Kings. His 12 triple-doubles ranked second on the season behind only Westbrook (34). On March 14, Jokic hit a rainbow hook-shot at the buzzer against the Dallas Mavericks to award Denver a 100–99 win.

In Game 1 of the Nuggets' first-round playoff series against the San Antonio Spurs, Jokić became the fourth player in NBA history to record a triple-double in his playoff debut and the first since James in 2006. Jokić had 10 points, 14 rebounds and 14 assists in the 101–96 loss. In Game 6 of the series, he scored 27 of his 43 points in the second half of the Nuggets' 120–103 loss. Jokić also had 12 rebounds and nine assists. Those 43 points set a franchise record for most points in a playoff game. In Game 7, he helped the Nuggets win the series, recording 21 points, 15 rebounds, and 10 assists in a 90–86 victory. In Game 1 of the second round, Jokić scored 37 points in a 121–113 victory over the Trail Blazers, becoming the first Nuggets player to score 35+ points in a conference semifinals game since Anthony (41 points) in May 2009. In Game 3 against Portland, Jokić had 33 points, 18 rebounds, and 14 assists in a 140–137 quadruple-overtime loss. He also logged 65 minutes during the game, the most since 1953, where another quadruple-overtime game occurred in the playoffs. In Game 4, Jokić had 21 points, 12 rebounds and 11 assists in a 116–112 win. In Game 5, he recorded 25 points and 19 rebounds in a 124–98 victory. His 19 rebounds tied a team NBA playoff high. The Nuggets were eliminated from the playoffs following a 100–96 loss to Portland in Game 7, despite Jokić's 29 points, 13 rebounds, and four blocks. In 14 playoff games, he averaged 25.1 points, 13.0 rebounds and 8.4 assists in 39.7 minutes per game, with shooting splits of 50.6%/39.3%/84.6% field goals/three-point shots/free throws. Following the season, Jokić was named as a player on the All-NBA First Team, a personal first for Jokić.

==== 2019–20 season: Western Conference Finals and NBA Bubble comebacks ====
On November 8, 2019, Jokić made a game-winning jumper against the Philadelphia 76ers with 1.2 seconds remaining, to give the Nuggets a 98–97 victory, rallying from a 21-point deficit. In the next game two days later, he hit yet another game-winning jumper in a 100–98 overtime victory over the Minnesota Timberwolves. On January 6, 2020, Jokić scored a then career-high 47 points against the Atlanta Hawks in a 123–115 road victory. On February 4, he recorded 30 points, 21 rebounds, and 10 assists in a 98–95 victory over the Utah Jazz; it was the first 30/20/10 game by any NBA player in four years, and only the third since Abdul-Jabbar in 1976. On January 30, Jokić was selected to his second consecutive All-Star nod, becoming the first Nugget since Anthony in 2011 to have back-to-back honors.

In the first round playoff series against the Utah Jazz, Jokić closed the series with a hook shot to break the 78–78 score into 80–78 with 27 seconds remaining in the game, winning it for the Nuggets. He finished with 30 points, 14 rebounds, and four assists. On September 13, Jokić recorded 34 points, 14 rebounds, and seven assists to lead Denver to a 111–98 Game 6 victory, overcoming a 19-point deficit in the second half. Two days later, Jokić recorded a triple-double with 16 points, 22 rebounds, and 13 assists to lead Denver to a 104–89 Game 7 victory over the heavily favored Los Angeles Clippers. Jokić joined Tim Duncan and Kevin Garnett as the only players in league history to post a 20-rebound triple-double in the postseason. With the win, the Nuggets became the first team in NBA history to come back from multiple 3–1 deficits in a single postseason. However, the Nuggets would go on to lose the Western Conference Finals in five games to the eventual NBA champion Los Angeles Lakers, with Jokić recording 22 points, 10 rebounds, and five assists in the lone Denver victory in Game 3.

==== 2020–21 season: First MVP award ====
Jokić started off the season with four triple-doubles in his first six games, in one of which he recorded a then career-high 18 assists, on December 29, 2020, against the Houston Rockets in a 124–111 victory. Doing so, Jokić became the first center to record at least 18 assists in a game since Chamberlain in 1968. On December 30, Jokić passed Fat Lever for most triple-doubles in Nuggets' franchise history in a 125–115 loss to the Sacramento Kings, which also saw him move up to ninth all-time in career triple-doubles. Jokić would continue his stellar play throughout the month of January, being awarded with back to back Western Conference Player of the Week awards, as well as being named the Western Conference Player of the Month, thus becoming the first Nuggets player to do so since Anthony.

On February 6, 2021, Jokić recorded a then career-high 50 points, eight rebounds, 12 assists, and three blocks in a 119–114 loss to the Sacramento Kings. He set a franchise record for being the first Nuggets player with at least 50 points and 10 assists while also becoming the first center to do so since Abdul-Jabbar in 1975. Jokić also joined Anthony and Allen Iverson as the only Nuggets players with more than 50 points scored in the past 20 seasons. Not only that, but Jokić opened the season with 20 consecutive double-double games, putting him only behind Bill Walton (34 in 1976–77) since the American Basketball Association merged with the NBA in 1976. That same month, Jokić was selected for his third consecutive All-Star appearance, this time as a starter, becoming the first Nuggets player to start in the All-Star game since Anthony in 2011, as well as joining Alex English and David Thompson as the only Nuggets players to be selected to three straight NBA All-Star games. On March 2, Jokić recorded his 50th career triple-double, with a stat-line of 37 points, 10 rebounds and 11 assists in a 128–97 victory on the road against the Milwaukee Bucks. Jokić became only the ninth player in NBA history to record 50 career triple-doubles, as well as only the second center to do so since Chamberlain. Jokić also became the third fastest player to reach 50 career triple-doubles, with only Robertson and Johnson doing it faster than him.

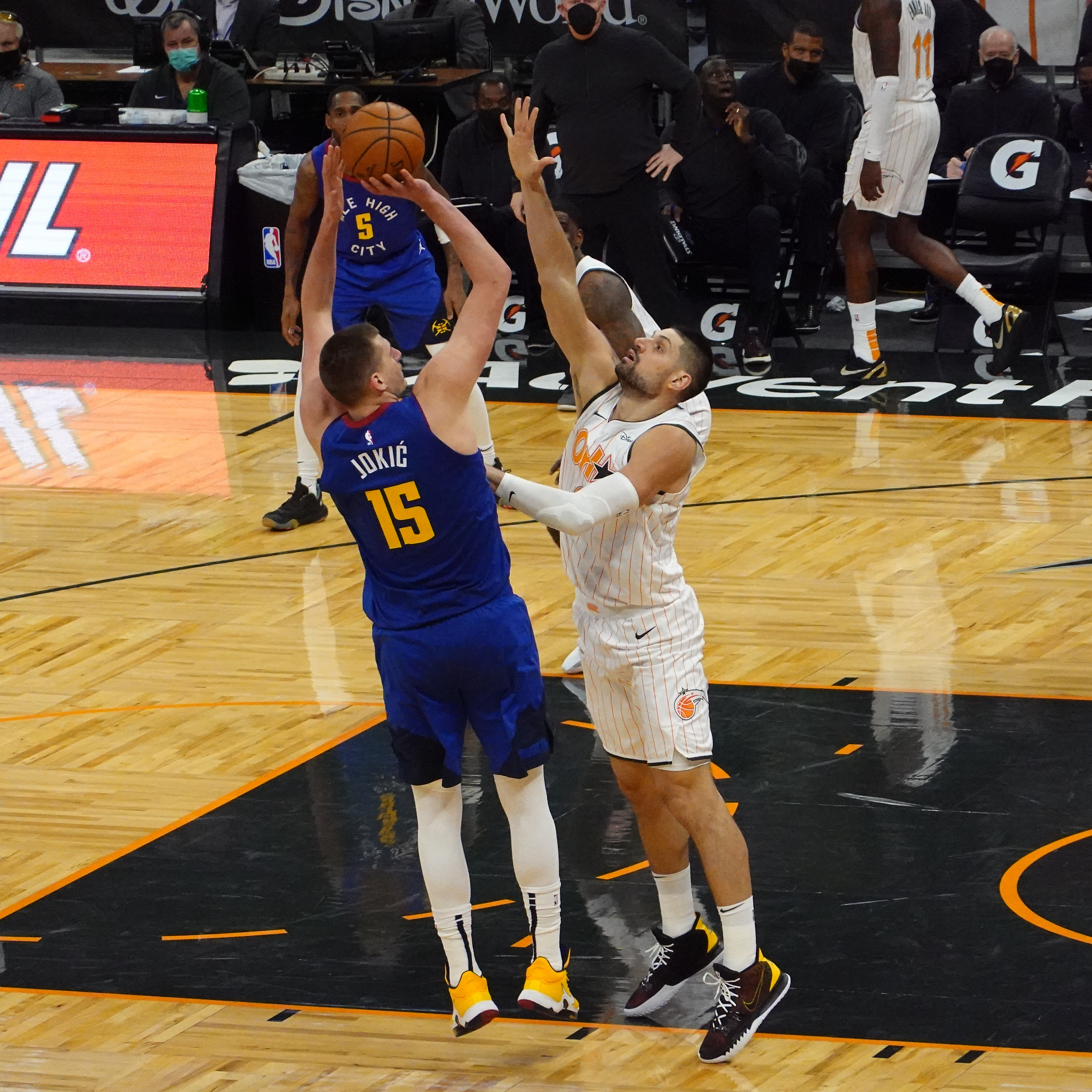
Jokić shooting over Nikola Vučević in a game against Orlando Magic in March 2021

On March 17, in a 129–104 victory over the Charlotte Hornets, Jokić surpassed Dikembe Mutombo for most double-doubles in Nuggets' franchise history. Jokić would go on to be named Western Conference Player of the Month, for the second time, for games played in March. By doing so, he became the only Nuggets' player in franchise history to win the award twice in a single season. On April 4, Jokić had 16 assists in a 119–109 victory over the Orlando Magic. As a result, he marked his 81st career 10-assist game, passing Chamberlain for the most double-digit assist games by a center in NBA history.

Despite an injury-laden regular season, Jokić led the Nuggets to a third seed in the Western Conference, boasting a 47–25 record. While playing and starting in every single game, he led the league in all the major advanced metrics intended to measure a player's value, such as player efficiency rating (PER), win shares, offensive win shares, box plus-minus, and value over replacement player (VORP). Jokić also finished as the league leader in double-doubles, racking up 60 double-doubles on the year, while finishing second to Westbrook for most triple-doubles on the season, with 16 triple-doubles of his own. Jokić joined Robertson and Westbrook as the only players in NBA history to average 26+ points, 10+ rebounds and 8+ assists for an entire season, and officially became the first-ever player to do so on better than 52 percent shooting (making 56.6 percent of his field goal attempts). Jokić also became just the third player in NBA history to finish a season ranked in the top five in total points (third), rebounds (fifth), and assists (third), joining Elgin Baylor and Chamberlain (3x).

In the first round of the playoffs, the Nuggets faced the Portland Trail Blazers. They would be without two of their best players, Jamal Murray and Will Barton, who were both out with injuries. Regardless, Jokić continued his elite level of play throughout the series, averaging 33 points (on 50/40/90 shooting splits), 10.5 rebounds, and 4.5 assists. In Game 6, Jokić scored 27 of his 36 points in the second half to lead the Nuggets to a 126–115 series-clinching victory. Denver would match up against the Phoenix Suns in the Western Conference Semifinals. In a Game 3 loss, Jokić tallied 32 points, 20 rebounds and 10 assists, joining Abdul-Jabbar and Chamberlain as the only players in NBA playoff history to post a 30/20/10 game. The Nuggets were eliminated from the playoffs in Game 4, with Jokić being ejected late in the third quarter after being assessed a flagrant foul two for making a hard swipe at the ball and catching the Suns' Cameron Payne in the face. For the playoffs, Jokić averaged 29.8 points, 11.6 rebounds, and 5.0 assists per game.

For his regular season performance, Jokić won the NBA Most Valuable Player Award; in doing so, he became the first center to win the award since Shaquille O'Neal in 2000 as well as the first player in Denver Nuggets franchise history. Jokić also became the first Serbian player, third European player overall, and sixth international player to ever win the award. (Note: Other European winners include Dirk Nowitzki (Germany) and Giannis Antetokounmpo (Greece); other international winners were Hakeem Olajuwon (Nigeria), Tim Duncan (U.S. Virgin Islands) and Steve Nash (Canada).) Having been selected 41st overall in the 2014 NBA draft, Jokić became the lowest-drafted player in NBA history to be named MVP, as well as the first-ever player to be drafted in the second round of the common draft era (since 1966) to win the award. Jokić and Vasilije Micić also became the first-ever pair of players from the same country to be awarded both NBA MVP and EuroLeague MVP honors in the same season.

==== 2021–22 season: Second MVP award ====
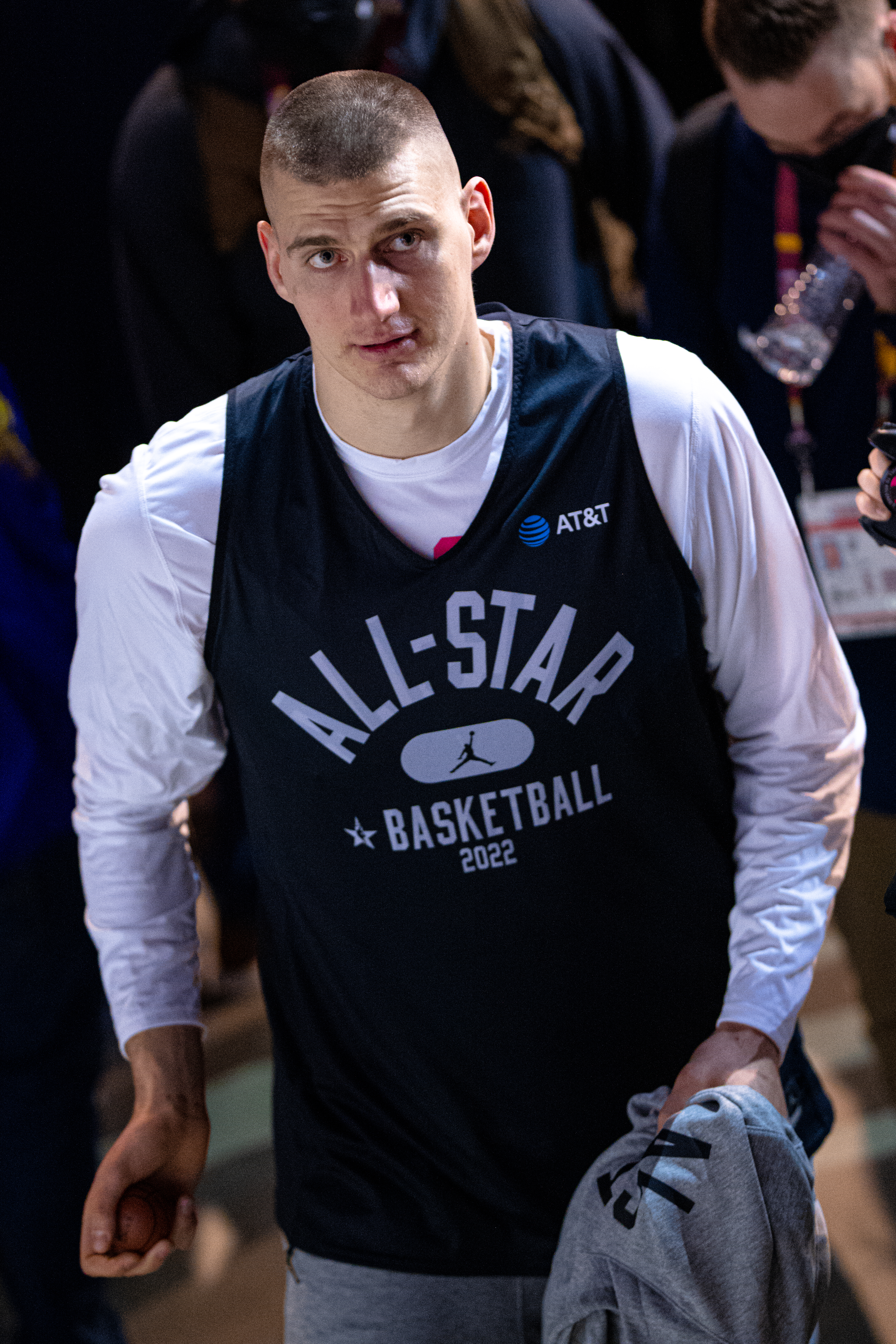
Jokić at the 2022 NBA All-Star Game

On November 8, 2021, in a 113–96 victory over the Miami Heat, Jokić and opposing forward Markieff Morris were both ejected after Morris shoved Jokić, leading Jokić to shoulder Morris in the back. The next day, the NBA announced that they had suspended Jokić for one game without pay. On December 6, Jokić recorded his 60th triple-double, in a 109–97 loss to the Chicago Bulls, overtaking Larry Bird for eighth on the all-time career triple-double list. On December 27, Jokić tied his career best with 22 rebounds and added 26 points, eight assists, two steals, and two blocks in a 103–100 victory against the Los Angeles Clippers, and became the first player to record 25-plus points, 20-plus rebounds, and five-plus assists in consecutive games since Charles Barkley in 1988.

On January 25, 2022, Jokić recorded 28 points, 21 rebounds, and nine assists in a 110–105 victory over the Detroit Pistons; he also became the only player in NBA history to record 5,000 rebounds and 3,000 assists within his first 500 career games. Two days later, Jokić was selected for his fourth consecutive NBA All-Star appearance, second in a row as a starter, joining Alex English as the only Nuggets players to be selected to four straight NBA All-Star games. For his play in January, Jokić was named Western Conference Player of the Month for the third time in his career, tying Carmelo Anthony and English for most Player of the Month honors in Nuggets franchise history. Jokić recorded seven triple-doubles and became one of just five players in NBA history to have seven-or-more in a single month, joining Chamberlain, Robertson, Westbrook, and Michael Jordan as the only players to achieve this feat.

On February 6, in his 500th NBA game, Jokić logged his 71st career triple-double with 27 points, 12 rebounds, 10 assists, and two steals on 12-of-15 shooting from the field in a 124–104 victory over the Brooklyn Nets; in league history, only Robertson (151) and Johnson (73) recorded more triple-doubles through their first 500 games. Five days later, he became the fifth player in NBA history to have multiple seasons recording 15 or more triple-doubles.

On March 6, in a 138–130 overtime victory over the Pelicans, Jokić recorded a triple-double with 46 points, 12 rebounds, 11 assists, three steals, and four blocks. He scored 30 of his 46 points in the fourth quarter and overtime, and joined Chamberlain as the only players to record a 45-point triple-double whilst shooting 70 percent from the field in the same game. Ten days later in a 127–109 victory over the Washington Wizards, Jokić became the second-fastest player to record 10,000 points, 5,000 rebounds, and 3,000 assists. He achieved this feat in his 516th NBA appearance, one game short of Larry Bird's record (515). On March 26, Jokić recorded 35 points, 12 rebounds, eight assists, two steals, and two blocks on 13-of-15 shooting from the field in a 113–107 victory over the Oklahoma City Thunder. He became the second player in NBA history after Chamberlain with three or more career 35-point, 10-rebound, and five-assist games on 85 percent shooting.

On April 7, Jokić recorded 35 points, 16 rebounds, six assists, and four steals in a 122–109 victory over the Memphis Grizzlies to clinch a playoff spot outside of the NBA play-in tournament. He became the first player in NBA history to tally at least 2,000 points, 1,000 rebounds, and 500 assists in a season. Jokić's late-season surge also saw him become the first player since Chamberlain to register at least 35 points and 12 rebounds in five straight games. For games played in March and April, Jokić was named Western Conference Player of the Month, for the second time in the season, and fourth time in his career, surpassing Carmelo Anthony and Alex English for most such honors in Nuggets franchise history. Jokić finished the regular season averaging 27.1 points, 13.8 rebounds, and 7.9 assists on 58.3%/33.7%/81.0% shooting splits, and led the Nuggets to a 48–34 winning record for the last direct playoff spot (No. 6) despite Denver's second and third best players missing nearly the entire season. He became the first player in NBA history to average over 25 points, 13 rebounds, and seven assists in a season and the first to lead his team in points, rebounds, assists, steals, blocks and field goal percentage. Jokić was the only player in the NBA this season to finish in the top 10 in points per game, rebounds per game and assists per game. His advanced metrics were historically great, garnering the highest single-season player efficiency rating in NBA history at 32.85. Jokić also led the NBA in win shares, offensive win shares, box plus-minus, value over replacement player, total rebounds, double-doubles (66), and triple-doubles (19).

On April 21, in Game 3 of the first round of the playoffs, Jokić logged 37 points, 18 rebounds, five assists, and three steals in a 118–113 loss to the Warriors. Three days later in Game 4, he recorded 37 points, eight rebounds, and six assists in a 126–121 victory. Denver would go on to lose to Golden State in five games despite Jokić's 30-point, 19-rebound, eight-assist, and two-block outing in the 102–98 close-out loss. He scored 12 of his 30 points in the final four minutes of the game. After the game, former Defensive Player of the Year and perennial All-Defensive Team member Draymond Green found Jokić for a word: "I told him thank you for making me better. It's an honor and a pleasure to play someone so skilled. Usually when you have guys that talented and skilled, they're soft. And he's far, far from soft. He's an absolutely incredible player." For the playoffs, Jokić averaged 31.0 points, 13.2 rebounds, 5.8 assists, 1.6 steals, and 1.0 block per game on 57.5% shooting from the field.

On May 12, Jokić was named the NBA Most Valuable Player Award for the second year in a row, beating finalists Joel Embiid and Giannis Antetokounmpo. He became the 13th player to win the award in consecutive seasons, as well as the second European player to win the award more than once, joining Antetokounmpo. On May 24, Jokić was selected to his third All-NBA First Team. He became the first player in club history to earn All-NBA team honors in four straight seasons and to have three career first-team selections, passing David Thompson for the most in franchise history.

==== 2022–23 season: First NBA championship and Finals MVP ====
On July 1, 2022, Jokić agreed to a five-year, $264 million supermax contract extension with the Nuggets, making it the richest deal in NBA history at the time of the signing. On November 3, Jokić put up 15 points, 13 rebounds, and 14 assists in a 122–110 victory over the Oklahoma City Thunder; surpassing Wilt Chamberlain for the most triple-doubles all time by a center with 79. On December 10, Jokić recorded his 80th career triple-double with 31 points, 12 rebounds, 14 assists and four blocks in a 115–110 win over the Utah Jazz. He became only the second player in NBA history to put up at least 31/12/14/4 in a game after LeBron James. On December 18, Jokić put up a triple-double with 40 points, a career-high 27 rebounds, and 10 assists in a 119–115 win over the Charlotte Hornets. He also became the first NBA player since Chamberlain in 1968 to put up at least 35 points, 25 rebounds, and 10 assists in a game. On December 25, Jokić dropped 41 points, 15 rebounds and 15 assists in a 128–125 overtime win over the Phoenix Suns. He became only the third player in NBA history to record a 40-point, 15-rebound and 15-assist game, joining Oscar Robertson and James Harden.

On January 1, 2023, Jokić recorded his 85th career triple-double with 30 points, 12 rebounds, 12 assists, and no turnovers on 10-of-13 shooting, 2-of-2 from three, 8-of-8 from the free throw line in a 123–111 victory over the Boston Celtics. He became the first player in NBA history to have multiple games of at least 30 points, 10 assists, and 10 rebounds without a turnover. Five days later, Jokić recorded a triple-double with 28 points, 15 rebounds, and 10 assists in a 121–108 win over the Cleveland Cavaliers. He also joined Robertson, Russell Westbrook, and Magic Johnson as the only players in NBA history to record at least 10 triple-doubles in six different seasons. On January 18, Jokić recorded his 90th career triple-double and second in a row with 31 points, 11 rebounds and 13 assists in a 122–118 victory over the Minnesota Timberwolves, and he surpassed Alex English (3,679) to become the Nuggets' all-time assists leader. Jokić also became the first center in NBA history to lead a franchise in career assists. Eight days later, he was named a Western Conference starter for the 2023 NBA All-Star Game, marking his fifth consecutive selection and third in a row as a starter. For his play in January, Jokić was named Western Conference Player of the Month for the fifth time in his career, making him the leader for most Player of the Month honors in Nuggets franchise history. With eight triple-doubles in January, he joined Chamberlain as the only centers in NBA history to record eight or more triple-doubles in a single month. Jokić also became the first player to have shooting splits of 65% from the field, 50% from three and 85% from the free throw line in a month.

On February 15, Jokić and the Nuggets won their 25th straight game when he had a triple-double. That was the most consecutive team wins when a player had a triple-double in NBA history, passing Johnson and the Lakers from 1984 to 1987. On February 28, he recorded his 100th career triple-double with 14 points, 11 rebounds, and 10 assists in a 133–112 victory over the Houston Rockets, becoming the sixth player in NBA history to have accomplished the feat. Jokić had recorded eight triple-doubles in February and joined Wilt Chamberlain as the only centers in NBA history to record eight or more triple-doubles in a single month. Jokić also became the third player in NBA history to average a triple-double in three consecutive months. By winning the Western Conference Player of the Month for February, Jokić became the first player in Nuggets' franchise history to win the award in back-to-back months.

On March 12, Jokić posted 35 points, 20 rebounds, 11 assists, two steals, and two blocks in a 134–124 loss against the Brooklyn Nets. He became the first player since the ABA–NBA merger to put up multiple games of at least 35 points, 20 rebounds, and 10 assists in a single season and third in NBA history after Chamberlain and Elgin Baylor. On March 27, Jokić recorded 25 points, 17 rebounds, and 12 assists in a 116–111 victory over the Philadelphia 76ers. He joined Chamberlain and Robertson as the only other players in NBA history to total 10+ games in a season of at least 20 points, 15 rebounds and 10 assists. On April 9, Jokić finished the regular season achieving career-highs in field goal percentage (.632 FG%) and assists per game (9.8), leading the Nuggets to the top seed in the Western Conference playoffs for the first time in franchise history. Jokić led the league in triple-doubles (29), finishing as the only player to ever average at least 20 points, 10 rebounds, and nine assists on at least 60% shooting over a single season. He also became Denver's all-time single-season leader in field goal percentage (63.2%), effective field goal percentage (66%) and true shooting (70.1%) while topping the league leaderboard in player efficiency rating, win shares, offensive win shares, box plus-minus, offensive box plus-minus, defensive box plus-minus, and value over replacement player.

In Game 2 of the Nuggets' first round playoffs series against the Minnesota Timberwolves, Jokić recorded 27 points, nine rebounds, and nine assists in a 122–113 victory. He also became the first player in NBA history to average at least 25 points, 10 rebounds, and five assists through their first 50 career playoff games. In Game 5, Jokić had his eighth career playoff triple-double with 28 points, 17 rebounds, 12 assists, two steals, and two blocks in a 112–109 victory, leading the Nuggets to the second round of the playoffs. He became just the fifth player in NBA history to record a 25-point, 15-rebound and 10-assist stat line in a clinching opportunity. Jokić joined Robertson (1963), Chamberlain (1967), James Worthy (1988), and James (2020) in that exclusive group.

In Game 1 of the Western Conference Semifinals, Jokić recorded 24 points, 19 rebounds, and five assists in a 125–107 victory over the Phoenix Suns. In Game 3, he put up a triple-double with 30 points, 17 rebounds, and a playoff career-high 17 assists in a 121–114 loss. Jokić became the first player in NBA history to record 25+ points, 15+ rebounds, and 15+ assists in a playoff game. He also tied Chamberlain's record for the most playoff triple-doubles in NBA history by a center with nine. In Game 4, Jokić put up a playoff career-high 53 points and 11 assists in a 129–124 loss. He surpassed Alex English to become the Nuggets' all-time leader in playoff points. He also became the first center in NBA history to put up at least 50 points and 10 assists in a playoff game. Jokić also joined Chamberlain as the only centers in NBA history to score at least 50 points in a playoff game. After Game 4, Jokić was fined $25,000 by the NBA for “improper contact with a spectator sitting courtside” during the game, when he made contact with Suns owner Mat Ishbia after unsuccessfully trying to retrieve a ball that had gone off court. However, Jokić was not given a suspension. In Game 5, he put up a triple-double with 29 points, 13 rebounds, 12 assists in a 118–102 victory, breaking a tie with Chamberlain for the most playoff triple-doubles in NBA history by a center with his 10th. In Game 6, Jokić put up a triple-double with 32 points, 10 rebounds, and 12 assists in a 125–100 victory to lead the Nuggets to the Western Conference Finals. He joined James and Westbrook as the only players to average a 30-plus point triple-double in a playoff series as Jokić finished with 34.5 ppg, 13.2 rpg, 10.3 apg in Denver's 4–2 series win over Phoenix. After the game former NBA Most Valuable Player Award winner Durant told reporters about Jokić: "Jokić is an all-time great. He's gonna go down as one of the all-time great centers to ever touch a basketball."

In Game 1 of the Western Conference Finals, Jokić posted a triple-double with 34 points, 21 rebounds, and 14 assists in a 132–126 victory over the Los Angeles Lakers. He tied Westbrook for third place all-time in playoff triple-doubles with 12. Jokić also became the only player in NBA postseason history to log multiple 30-point, 20-rebound triple-doubles. In Game 2, he had his fourth consecutive triple-double and seventh triple-double of these playoffs with 23 points, 17 rebounds, 12 assists, and three steals in a 108–103 victory. Jokić became the second player to post four consecutive triple-doubles in NBA playoff history and is now one of just two players to tally seven triple-doubles in one postseason along with Wilt Chamberlain. Jokić also surpassed Westbrook to stand alone on third all-time in playoff triple-doubles. In Game 4, Jokić posted his 14th career playoff triple-double and eighth of the playoffs breaking Chamberlain's 1967 NBA record for triple-doubles in a single postseason. Jokić finished the 113–111 victory with 30 points, 14 rebounds, 13 assists, and three blocks. Jokić was awarded his first NBA Conference Finals Most Valuable Player Award, becoming the first non-American player to win the award, achieving triple-double series averages of 27.8 points, 14.5 rebounds, and 11.8 assists while leading the Nuggets to a sweep over the Lakers en route to their first NBA Finals appearance in franchise history. Jokić also joined Wilt Chamberlain as the only player in NBA history to average a triple-double in back-to-back playoffs series.

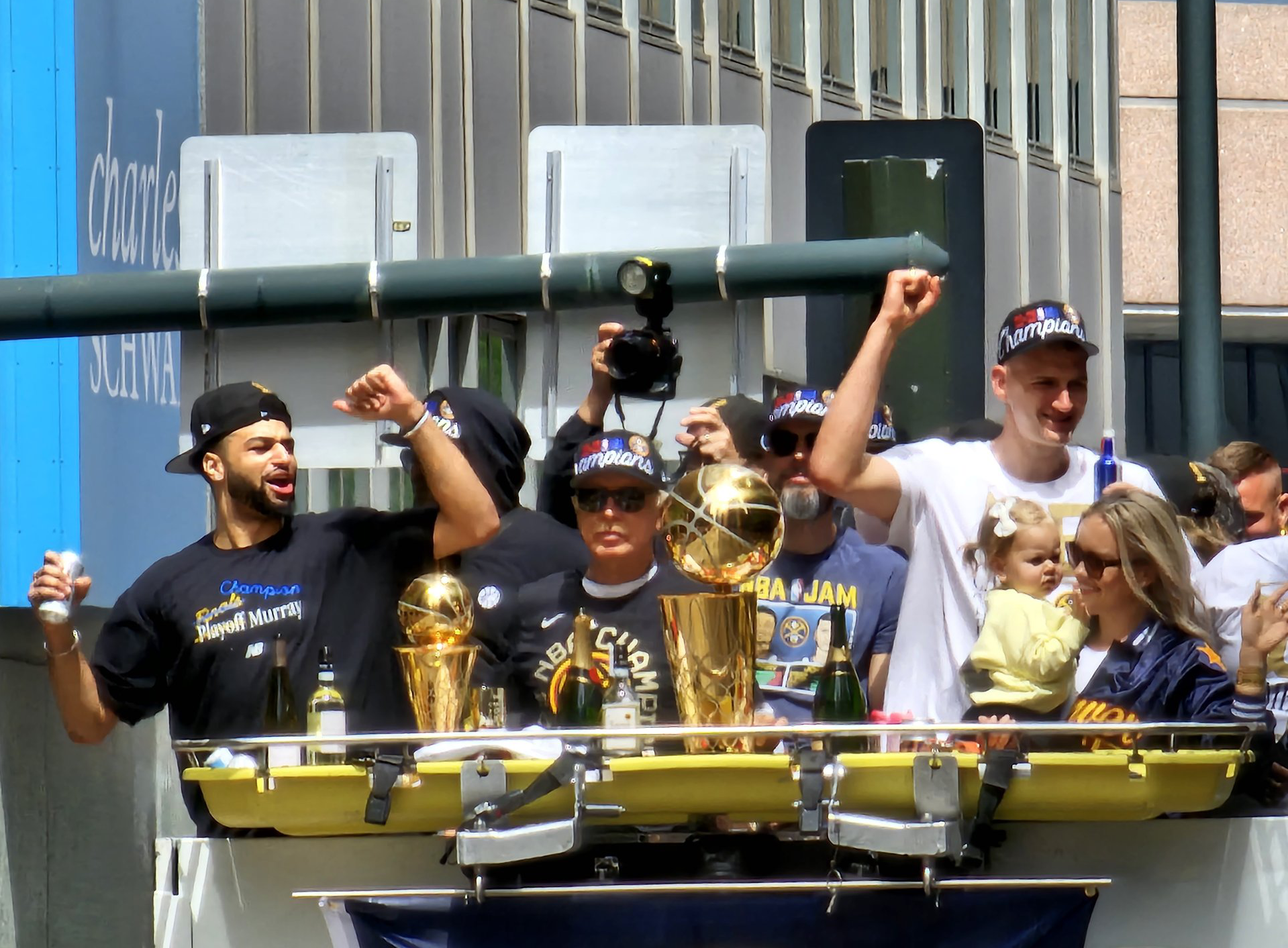
Nuggets owner Stan Kroenke, Jokić and Jamal Murray parading the NBA championship in Denver

In Game 1 of the NBA Finals, Jokić posted a triple-double with 27 points, 14 assists, and 10 rebounds in a 104–93 victory over the Miami Heat. He joined Jason Kidd as the only players in NBA history to put up a triple-double in their NBA Finals debuts. Jokić and Jamal Murray also became only the second pair of teammates in NBA history to each put up at least 25 points and 10 assists in an NBA Finals game since Magic Johnson and James Worthy in the 1987 NBA Finals. In Game 2, Jokić put up 41 points, 11 rebounds, and four assists in a 111–108 loss. He joined LeBron James and Larry Bird as the only players in NBA history to put up at least 500 points, 200 rebounds, and 150 assists in a single postseason run. Jokić also became the first center in NBA history to put up at least 500 points and 100 assists in a single postseason run. In Game 3, he became the first player in NBA history to record 30+ points, 20+ rebounds and 10+ assists in a Finals game. He finished the 109–94 victory with 32 points, 21 rebounds, and 10 assists, marking his 10th triple-double of this postseason. Jokić is also responsible for three of the five 30-point, 20-rebound and 10-assist playoff games ever, with two of those coming in these playoffs. Kareem Abdul-Jabbar and Wilt Chamberlain each have one. Jokić and Jamal Murray also became the first teammates in NBA history (regular season or playoffs) to record 30-point triple-doubles in the same game, with the latter also posting a 30-point triple-double in Game 3. In Game 4, Jokić put up 23 points, 12 rebounds, four assists, three steals and three blocks in a 108–95 victory. He also became the first player in NBA history to put up at least 500 points, 250 rebounds, and 150 assists in a single postseason run. In Game 5, Jokić put up 28 points, 16 rebounds, and four assists on 12-of-16 shooting from the field in a 94–89 victory, leading the Nuggets to their first NBA championship in franchise history while winning Finals MVP. He was unanimously voted as Finals MVP and became the lowest draft pick in NBA history to win this award. The only other 2nd-round draft picks to win the award are Willis Reed, Dennis Johnson and later Jalen Brunson. Jokić finished the NBA Finals averaging 30.2 points, 14 rebounds, 7.2 assists, and 1.4 blocks. He became the first player in NBA history to lead the entire postseason in total points (600), total rebounds (269) and total assists (186).

==== 2023–24 season: Third MVP award ====
On October 24, 2023, Jokić recorded a triple-double with 29 points, 13 rebounds and 11 assists as the Denver Nuggets launched the defense of their NBA championship crown with a season-opening 119–107 victory over the Los Angeles Lakers. He became just the third reigning Finals MVP to open an NBA season with a triple-double, joining Magic Johnson (1982) and LeBron James (2016). Six days later in his 600th NBA game, Jokić posted his 107th triple-double, with a 27-point, 11-assist, and 10-rebound stat-line, in a 110–102 victory over the Utah Jazz. Subsequently, he tied Jason Kidd and LeBron James for 4th, on the all-time triple-doubles list. On November 3, Jokić had 33 points, 14 rebounds and nine assists on 14-of-16 shooting from the field in a 125–114 victory over the Dallas Mavericks. Three days later, he recorded a triple-double with 35 points, 14 rebounds, and 12 assists in a 134–116 victory over the New Orleans Pelicans. Jokić's triple-double was the 108th in his career, surpassing James and Kidd for fourth place on the all-time career triple-double list. On November 12, Jokić put up 36 points, 21 rebounds, and 11 assists in a 107–104 loss to the Houston Rockets. He also joined Wilt Chamberlain and Oscar Robertson as the only players to have 10 games with at least 30 points, 15 rebounds, and 10 assists. Five days later, Jokić logged his 110th triple-double of his career with 26 points, 16 rebounds, and tied his career high with 18 assists in a 115–110 loss against the New Orleans Pelicans. Jokić tied Wilt Chamberlain for second all-time in games with at least 25 points, 15 rebounds, and 15 assists.

On December 4, Jokić was named Western Conference Player of the Month for the seventh time in his career for games played in October/November. He became the first player since Elgin Baylor in 1967 to start a season with 12 straight games of 20+ points and 10+ rebounds. Jokić also had two 30+ point triple-doubles with zero turnovers in his last four games while nobody else in the NBA has multiple games doing that in the last 40 years. On December 14, Jokić had 26 points, 15 rebounds, and 10 assists in his 115th career triple-double during the regular season in a 124–101 victory over the Brooklyn Nets. Jokić became the first player in NBA history with 10-plus triple-doubles in seven straight seasons. On December 25, Jokić put up 26 points, 14 rebounds, and eight assists while shooting a career-high 18-of-18 from the free-throw line in a 120–114 victory over the Golden State Warriors. Three days later, Jokić posted a triple-double with 26 points on 11-of-11 shooting from the field, 14 rebounds, and 10 assists in a 142–105 victory over the Memphis Grizzlies. He joined Wilt Chamberlain as the only players in NBA history to record a triple-double on 100% shooting (minimum 10 field goal attempts) in multiple games. For the 2023 calendar year, Jokić was named winner of the Hickok Belt, presented annually by the National Sports Media Association to the top professional athlete in the United States.

On January 4, 2024, Jokić put up 34 points on 13-of-16 shooting from the field along with nine assists, 10 rebounds, and a buzzer-beating, game-winning three-pointer in a 130–127 victory over the Warriors. He missed only five shots over his last four games, hitting 86.6%, which registers as the best for any player in the last 40 years (minimum 40 FGA) over a four-game span. On January 16, Jokić recorded 25 points and 19 rebounds, including a career-high 11 offensive boards in a 126–121 loss against the Philadelphia 76ers. After the game Joel Embiid told Jokić that his counterpart was "the best player in the league.” Five days later, Jokić scored a season-high 42 points on 15-of-20 shooting, along with 12 rebounds, eight assists, three blocks, and no turnovers in 113–104 victory over the Washington Wizards. On January 25, Jokić was named a Western Conference starter for the 2024 NBA All-Star Game, marking his sixth consecutive selection and his fourth selection in a row as a starter. He joined Alex English as the only other Nugget to be picked to start in four All-Star games.

On February 2, Jokić recorded his 120th career triple-double with 27 points, 22 rebounds, 12 assists, one steal, and two blocks in a 120–108 victory over the Portland Trail Blazers. He became the first player in NBA history to record that line or better in a game, per Basketball Reference's StatHead. On February 22, Jokić put up a triple-double with 21 points on 10-of-10 shooting from the field, 19 rebounds, and 15 assists in a 130–110 victory over the Washington Wizards. He also joined LeBron James and Russell Westbrook as the only players in NBA history to put up a triple-double against every NBA team faced. Three days later, Jokić put up a triple-double with 32 points, 16 rebounds, and 16 assists in a 110–103 victory over the Warriors. He put up his third career game with at least 30 points, 15 rebounds, and 15 assists, surpassing Wilt Chamberlain for the second most such games in NBA history. On March 11, Jokić posted a triple-double with 35 points, 17 rebounds, 12 assists, six steals, and two blocks in a 125–119 victory over the Toronto Raptors. On April 2, Jokić tied his season-high with 42 points, to go along with 16 rebounds, six assists, and two blocks in a 110–105 victory over the San Antonio Spurs. He also surpassed Carmelo Anthony for third place on the Nuggets' All-Time Scoring List. Eight days later, Jokić recorded 41 points, 11 rebounds, and seven assists on 16-of-20 shooting from the field in a 116–107 victory over the Minnesota Timberwolves. It was his 20th career 40-point game.

In Game 2 of the Nuggets' first round playoffs series against the Los Angeles Lakers, Jokić recorded a triple-double with 27 points, 20 rebounds, and 10 assists in a 101–99 victory. He has the most 25-20-10 games in NBA playoff history with four. The only other players to put up those numbers in a playoff game are Wilt Chamberlain (twice), Kareem Abdul-Jabbar and Dave Cowens, but Jokić is the only one to do it since the NBA and ABA merged after the 1975–76 season. A week later, Jokić narrowly missed another 25–20–10 game, posting 25 points, 20 rebounds, and nine assists in a 108–106 Game 5 victory, thus sending the Nuggets past the Lakers to the Western Conference Semifinals. In Game 5 of the Western Conference Semifinals, Jokić logged 40 points, seven rebounds, 13 assists, and no turnovers in a 112–97 win over the Minnesota Timberwolves. He became the second player in NBA postseason history to finish a game with at least 40 points, 10 assists, and no turnovers, joining Chris Paul (2018). Jokić was directly responsible for 71 of his team's 112 points and became the first player in NBA history to score or assist on 70+ points in a playoff game without committing a turnover (since turnovers were first tracked in 1977–78). Denver would go on to lose to Minnesota in seven games despite Jokić's 34-point, 19-rebound and seven-assist outing in the 98–90 close-out loss.

On May 8, Jokić won his third MVP beating finalists Shai Gilgeous-Alexander and Luka Dončić. He became only the ninth player in NBA history to win the award at least three times, doing so in four seasons. Jokić also became just the second player in NBA history to have at least 2,000 points, 900 rebounds, and 700 assists in a season, joining Oscar Robertson (1961–62). Behind Jokić, the Denver Nuggets (57–25) matched the franchise high for victories in a season and tied for the best record in the Western Conference.

==== 2024–25 season: First triple-double season ====
On October 26, 2024, Jokić scored 41 points and made a career-high seven 3-pointers in a 109–103 loss to the Los Angeles Clippers. In the next game, Jokić posted 40 points, 10 rebounds, four assists and two blocks in a 127–125 overtime win over the Toronto Raptors. He recorded back-to-back 40-point games for the first time in his career. On October 29, Jokić had a triple-double with 29 points, 18 rebounds and 16 assists in a 144–139 overtime win over the Brooklyn Nets. He became only the second player in NBA history to achieve this stat line and the first in 62 years. The only player to have previously reached those totals in a game was Oscar Robertson, who did it twice in 1962. Jokić also became the 1st player with multiple triple-doubles and multiple 40-point games within his first 4 games of a season in NBA history. On November 6, Jokić logged a triple-double with 23 points, 20 rebounds, 16 assists, two steals and two blocks in a 124–122 win over the Oklahoma City Thunder. He joined Russell Westbrook on April 2, 2019, as the 2nd player to record a 20/20/15 game since Wilt Chamberlain in 1968. On November 8, Jokić posted 30 points, 11 rebounds and 14 assists on 11-of-13 shooting from the field in a 135–122 win over the Miami Heat. With 30 points, 11 rebounds, and 14 assists on 84% shooting, he joined Wilt Chamberlain as just the second player in NBA history to record that line on at least 80% from the field. This was Jokić's third career 30-point triple-double on at least 80% shooting. Only Chamberlain has more. On November 10, Jokić had 37 points, 18 rebounds, 15 assists and three steals for his fourth straight triple-double in a 122–120 win over the Dallas Mavericks. He recorded a stat line in this game that no other player in NBA history has reached. Jokić also became the first player in NBA history to compile the following numbers after the first 10 games of a season: 297 points, 137 rebounds and 117 assists.

On December 5, he posted his 139th career triple-double with 27 points, 20 rebounds, and 11 assists in a 126–114 loss to the Cleveland Cavaliers. He also passed Magic Johnson for third place in the NBA's all time triple-doubles list. On December 8, Jokić scored a then career-high 56 points in a loss against the Washington Wizards. It was just the third time in NBA history that a player had tallied 56 points, 16 rebounds, and eight assists in a game. The other two instances were Elgin Baylor (1959) and Luka Doncic (2022). He also became the first player in NBA history to put up at least 55 points, 15 rebounds, five assists, and three three-pointers made in a game. The next day, Jokić logged 48 points, 14 rebounds, eight assists and three steals in a 141–111 win over the Atlanta Hawks. His final line has only been achieved four other times in NBA history. One of these instances was by Jokić himself in 2022, two were by his Nuggets' teammate Russell Westbrook (2015, 2017) and the other was Larry Bird in 1992. He also became only the third player in NBA history to record back-to-back games with at least 45 points, 10 rebounds, and five assists. The first two were Elgin Baylor in 1961 and Wilt Chamberlain in 1963. On December 30, Jokić had 36 points, 22 rebounds, 11 assists and four steals in a 132–121 win over the Utah Jazz. During the game he became the fastest center since Shaquille O'Neal to record 15,000 career points.

On January 2, 2025, Jokić recorded 23 points, 17 rebounds and 15 assists playing 29:31 minutes in a 139–120 win over the Atlanta Hawks. He became the first player in NBA history to record 20/15/15 in less than 30 minutes. On January 10, Jokić put up a triple-double with 35 points, 15 assists, and 12 rebounds in a 124–105 win over the Brooklyn Nets. His teammate Russell Westbrook also recorded a triple-double with 25 points, 11 rebounds, and 10 assists, leading to both of them becoming the first pair of teammates in NBA history to each record a triple-double in the same game multiple times in a season. On January 14, Jokić became the fastest player to reach 15,000 points, 7,500 rebounds and 5,000 assists, accomplishing the feat in just 709 games. The fastest previous mark was held by Larry Bird, who needed 799 games. On January 23, Jokić put up his 150th career triple-double and fifth in a row with 35 points, 22 rebounds, and 17 assists in a 132–123 win over the Sacramento Kings. He became the second player in NBA history to put up at least 35 points, 20 rebounds, and 15 assists in a game, joining Wilt Chamberlain. Jokić also nailed a 66-foot shot with 1.7 seconds left in the third quarter. On January 25, Jokić was named a Western Conference starter for the 2025 NBA All-Star Game, marking his seventh consecutive selection and his fifth selection in a row as a starter. He was also, for the first time, the leading vote-getter for the All-Star Game in the Western Conference. On January 27, Jokić became the first player in NBA history to shoot 100% in a half (min. 10 attempts) while also recording 8 assists, in a 121–129 loss to the Chicago Bulls, also achieving another triple-double with 33 points, 12 rebounds and 14 assists. For his play in January, Jokić was named the Western Conference Player of the Month for the eighth time in his career. On February 24, Jokić posted a then career-high 19 assists along with 18 points, nine rebounds and three steals in a 125–116 win over the Indiana Pacers.

On March 7, Jokić had 31 points, 21 rebounds and a career-high 22 assists in a 149–141 overtime win over the Phoenix Suns, becoming the first player in NBA history to record a triple-double of at least 30 points, 20 rebounds and 20 assists. On March 26, Jokić recorded his 160th career triple-double and his 30th of the season with 39 points, 10 rebounds and 10 assists in a 127–117 win over the Milwaukee Bucks. He became only the fourth player in league history to have 30 or more triple-doubles in a season. On March 28, Jokić put up 27 points, 14 rebounds, six assists and four steals in a 129–93 win over the Utah Jazz. He scored his 16,000th career point and became the fastest player in league history to tally at least 16,000 points, 8,000 rebounds and 5,000 assists—doing so in 739 games. Jokić accomplished the feat in 60 fewer games than the previous record holder Larry Bird, who reached the milestone in his first 799 career games. On April 1, Jokić put up a 61 points, 10 rebounds and 10 assists in a 140–139 double overtime loss to the Minnesota Timberwolves. His 61 points broke a record for his career-high, and became the highest-scoring triple-double in NBA history. He also became the third player to achieve a 60-point triple double, after James Harden (2018) and Luka Dončić (2022). On April 6, Jokić posted 41 points, 15 rebounds, 13 assists, 2 steals and 1 block against the Indiana Pacers in a 125–120 loss. According to Stathead, he is the first player in NBA history to record those stats in a single game. Jokić logged a triple-double by the end of the third, marking his 32nd triple-double of the season — the most ever recorded by a center in NBA history, surpassing Wilt Chamberlain's single-season record of 31. It was also his 30th career 40-point game. On April 11, Jokić had his 34th triple-double of the season with 26 points, 16 rebounds and 13 assists in a 117–109 win over the Memphis Grizzlies. He became the third player in NBA history to average a triple-double for a season, after Oscar Robertson and Russell Westbrook. Jokić also became the first and only player in NBA history to finish top three in points, assists, rebounds, and steals per game in a season. On April 16, Jokić was named Sporting News' Player of the Year. Jokić was the runner-up for both the Clutch Player of the Year and NBA Most Valuable Player awards, becoming just the third player in league history to finish in the top two of MVP voting for five or more consecutive seasons.

On April 26, in Game 4 of the first round playoffs series, Jokić had 36 points, 21 rebounds, and eight assists in a 101–99 win over the Los Angeles Clippers. He became one of just four players in NBA history to record 35+ points, 20+ rebounds, and 8+ assists in a playoff game. On May 5, Jokić put up 42 points, 22 rebounds, and six assists in a 121–119 comeback win over the Oklahoma City Thunder in Game 1 of the second round. He also joined Giannis Antetokounmpo, Shaquille O'Neal, and Wilt Chamberlain as the only players in NBA history to put up at least 40 points, 20 rebounds and five assists in a playoff game. On May 13, in Game 5 of the Western Conference Semifinals, Jokić recorded 44 points, 15 rebounds, five assists, and two steals on 17-of-25 shooting, including 5-of-7 from three-point range and a perfect 5-of-5 from the free throw line, in a 112–105 loss to the Thunder. He became the first NBA player since Wilt Chamberlain to record multiple games with 40+ points, 15+ rebounds, and 5+ assists in a single playoff series. This performance marked the 7th time that Jokić had 40+ points in a playoff game, which is the most in franchise history. Despite his historic efforts, Denver ultimately lost the series to Oklahoma in seven games.

==== 2025–26 season: Second triple-double season, rebounds and assists leader ====
On October 29, 2025, Jokić recorded 21 points, 12 rebounds, and 10 assists, matching an NBA record with his fourth consecutive triple-double to start the season, as the Denver Nuggets defeated the New Orleans Pelicans 122–88. With the performance, He became the third player in NBA history, after Oscar Robertson (1961–62) and Russell Westbrook (2020–21), to begin a season with four consecutive triple-doubles. On November 5, Jokić recorded his 169th career triple-double, posting 33 points, 15 rebounds, 16 assists, and 3 steals in a 122–112 victory over the Miami Heat. It was his seventh career 30/15/15 game, a mark second only to Oscar Robertson (11) in NBA history. On November 12, Jokić posted a season-high 55 points, 12 rebounds, and 6 assists on 18-of-23 shooting from the field in a 130–116 victory over the Los Angeles Clippers. He became the first player since play-by-play data began (1997–98) to reach 50 points, 10 rebounds, and 5 assists before the 4th quarter. Jokić joined Luka Dončić and Wilt Chamberlain, who had previously posted a 55-point game with at least 10 rebounds and 5 assists while shooting at least 75% from the field. Additionally, he became just the fourth player in NBA history to record a 55/10/5 stat line on the second night of a back-to-back. His efficiency was remarkable, making him only the third player in the shot-clock era to score 55+ points while recording more assists than missed field goals. Jokić scored 25 points in the first quarter, the most he has ever scored in a single quarter of an NBA game. On November 17, Jokić logged 36 points, 18 rebounds, and 13 assists in a 130–127 loss to the Chicago Bulls. He became the second all-time leading scorer in Nuggets history, surpassing Dan Issel. On November 19, Jokić recorded his 172nd career triple-double, posting 28 points, 11 rebounds, and 12 assists in a 125–118 win over the New Orleans Pelicans. With the performance, he became the first NBA player since Oscar Robertson (1961–62) to accumulate 400 or more points, 150 or more rebounds, and 150 or more assists within the first 15 games of a season. For his play in October and November, Jokić was named the Western Conference Player of the Month for the ninth time in his career.

On December 18, Jokić recorded a triple-double with 23 points, 11 rebounds, and 13 assists in a 126–115 win over the Orlando Magic. In the game, he surpassed Kareem Abdul-Jabbar’s record of 5,660 assists to become the NBA's all-time leader in career assists by a center, recording his 5,661st assist. Abdul-Jabbar reached the mark in 1,560 games, while Jokić did so in 771 games. On December 25, Jokić put up a triple-double with 56 points, 16 rebounds, and 15 assists in a 142–138 overtime win over the Minnesota Timberwolves. He scored 18 of his 56 points in overtime, surpassing the previous record set by Stephen Curry (17) for the most points scored by an individual in overtime in NBA history. He also became the first player in NBA history to put up at least 55 points, 15 rebounds, and 15 assists in a game. On December 27, Jokić recorded his 180th career triple-double with 34 points, 21 rebounds and 12 assists in a tight 127–126 loss to the Orlando Magic, and it was his eighth career game with at least 30 points, 20 rebounds and 10 assists, passing Oscar Robertson for the second-most such games in NBA history. He also became the first player in NBA history to accumulate more than 110 points, 40 rebounds and 40 assists over a three-game span. On December 29, during a 147–123 loss to the Miami Heat, he suffered a left leg injury after teammate Spencer Jones inadvertently backed into Jokić's stance. After initial fear of potential season-jeopardizing ligament damage, Jokić was subsequently ruled out for about four weeks with a hyperextended left knee.

On January 30, 2026, Jokić returned to the court after a 16-game absence, putting up 31 points, 12 rebounds and 5 assists, in a 122–109 win over the Los Angeles Clippers. Doing so he became the first player in NBA history to record 30+ points, 10+ rebounds, and 5+ assists while playing less than 25 minutes in a game. On February 4, 2026, Jokić put up his 181st triple-double in a 127–134 overtime loss to the New York Knicks, recording 30 points, 14 rebounds, 10 assists and zero turnovers, tying him with Oscar Robertson for the second most triple-doubles all-time. On February 7, Jokić put up his 182nd triple-double in a 136–120 win over the Chicago Bulls, recording 22 points, 17 assists, and 14 rebounds, surpassing Oscar Robertson to become the sole player with the second most triple-doubles all-time. On February 22, Jokić recorded his 185th career triple-double with 35 points, 20 rebounds, 12 assists, three steals, and two blocks in a 128–117 loss to the Golden State Warriors. On March 12, Jokić posted his 190th career triple-double with 31 points, 20 rebounds, and 12 assists to help the Nuggets rally from a 20-point deficit for a 136–131 win over the San Antonio Spurs. On March 25, Jokić recorded his 30th triple-double of the season with 23 points, 21 rebounds, and a season-high 19 assists in a 142–135 win over the Dallas Mavericks, surpassing 6,000 career assists in the process. He became the first player in NBA history to record back-to-back games with at least 15 points, 15 rebounds, and 15 assists. It was his fourth career 20/20/15 game, passing Oscar Robertson for the second-most all-time, trailing only Wilt Chamberlain (5). Jokić joined Russell Westbrook as the only players in NBA history to record 30 or more triple-doubles in a season on multiple occasions. on March 28, Jokić logged 33 points, 15 rebounds, and 12 assists on 13-of-16 shooting, leading the Nuggets to a 135–129 comeback victory over the Utah Jazz. With this performance, he joined Russell Westbrook as the only players in NBA history to average 25 points, 15 rebounds, and 15 assists over a four-game span.

On April 4, Jokić recorded 40 points, 8 rebounds, 13 assists, three blocks, and zero turnovers in a 136–134 overtime win over the San Antonio Spurs. He became the first center to record 40 points and 10 assists without committing a turnover in a single game. With that performance, Jokić also joined Larry Bird, Luka Dončić, and World B. Free as the only players to post 40+ points, 10+ assists, and 5+ rebounds with zero turnovers since turnovers were officially tracked in the 1977–78 season. On April 6, Jokić had a triple-double with 35 points, 14 rebounds, 13 assists, and five steals in a 137–132 overtime win over the Portland Trail Blazers. It was his second career game with at least 35 points, 10 rebounds, 10 assists, and five steals, the most by any player since steals were first officially tracked in the 1973–74 season. Jokić finished the regular season as the first player in NBA history to lead the league in both rebounds per game (12.9) and assists per game (10.7). Jokić again averaged a triple-double for the season, the second player to do so in back-to-back seasons after Russell Westbrook. He also finished the regular season second in MVP voting. With this, Jokić became just the third player in NBA history to record six consecutive top-two finishes in MVP voting, tying the NBA record previously shared by Bill Russell (1958–1963) and Larry Bird (1981–1986). Jokić was named for the sixth time to the All-NBA First Team, and earned All-NBA honors for the eighth consecutive season. He and Jamal Murray became just the second pair of Nuggets teammates to receive All-NBA honors in the same season, joining Carmelo Anthony and Chauncey Billups in 2008–09.

On April 18, in Game 1 of the first round playoffs series, Jokić recorded a triple-double with 25 points, 13 rebounds, and 11 assists in a 116–105 win over the Minnesota Timberwolves. He and Jamal Murray had their eighth playoff game with both posting 25+ points, 5+ rebounds, and 5+ assists, tying Michael Jordan and Scottie Pippen for the most instances by a duo in NBA playoff history. In Game 5, Jokić had his 23rd career playoff triple-double with 27 points, 12 rebounds, and 16 assists, leading the Nuggets to a 125–113 victory over the Minnesota Timberwolves. With the performance, he reached 221 career triple-doubles across the regular season and playoffs, matching Russell Westbrook for the most in NBA history.

==== 2026–27 season ====
On October 24, 2026, Jokić recorded a triple-double with 35 points, 15 rebounds, and 10 assists in a 141–135 overtime victory over the New Orleans Pelicans. It was his 222nd career triple-double across the regular season and playoffs combined, surpassing Russell Westbrook for the most in NBA history. On October 28, Jokić notched his 200th career triple-double, finishing with 21 points, 13 rebounds, and 10 assists in a 104–91 win over the New Orleans Pelicans. He became the second player in NBA history to reach 200 career triple-doubles, joining Russell Westbrook.

== National team career ==
=== Junior national team ===
Jokić was a member of the Serbian U-19 national basketball team that won the silver medal at the 2013 FIBA Under-19 World Championship. Over eight tournament games, he averaged 7.1 points, 5.0 rebounds and 1.5 assists per game.

=== Senior national team ===
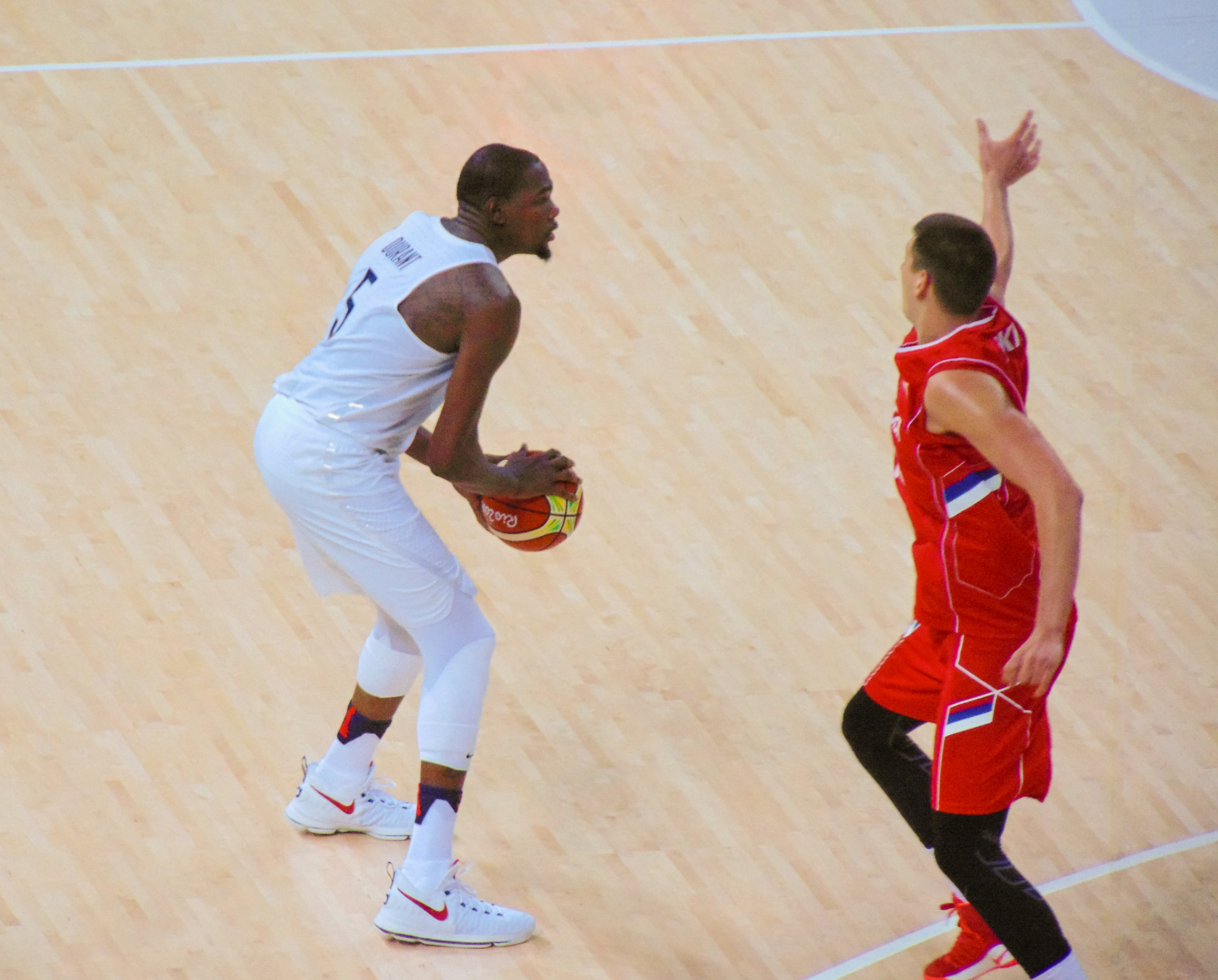
Jokić defending Kevin Durant at the 2016 Summer Olympics in Rio de Janeiro

Jokić represented Serbia at the 2016 FIBA World Olympic Qualifying Tournament in Belgrade, where he earned tournament MVP honors while averaging 17.8 points, 7.5 rebounds, and 2.8 assists per game. At the 2016 Summer Olympics, Jokić and Serbia won the silver medal, after losing to the United States in the final game 96–66.

On May 24, 2019, Jokić announced he would play for Serbia at the 2019 FIBA Basketball World Cup. At the 2019 FIBA Basketball World Cup, the national team of Serbia was dubbed as favorite to win the trophy, but was eventually upset in the quarterfinals by Argentina. With wins over the United States and Czech Republic, it finished in fifth place. Jokić was the second-best player on the team behind Bogdan Bogdanović, averaging 11.5 points, 7.5 rebounds, and 4.8 assists over eight games, while shooting 68.0% from the field.

On June 15, 2022, Jokić announced that he would return to the national team after three years for the 2023 FIBA World Cup qualifiers and the EuroBasket 2022. Jokić led Serbia to a perfect 5–0 record and first place in Group D at the EuroBasket 2022, but was eventually upset in the Round of 16 by Italy despite his 32-point, 13-rebound, four-assist, and two-steal outing. Jokić was the best player on the team, averaging 21.7 points, 10.0 rebounds, 4.3 assists, and 1.8 steals over six games, while shooting 66.2 percent from the field, 46.2 percent from three-point range, and 90.9 percent from the free throw line. In July 2023, he opted not to be selected for the 2023 FIBA World Cup due to physical and mental fatigue following his victorious season at Denver Nuggets.

On June 10, 2024, Jokić was included on Serbia's preliminary roster for the 2024 Summer Olympics. On July 31, Jokić had 14 points, 15 rebounds and 9 assists in the second group stage game against Puerto Rico at the Olympics. He became the first player in Olympics history to combine 10+ points, 15+ rebounds and 5+ assists. On August 6, in the quarter–finals, Jokić powered Serbia to an Olympic record 24–point comeback – with another near triple–double performance of 21 points, 14 rebounds, and nine assists – along with four steals and two blocks, in a 95–90 overtime win against Australia. He led Serbia to a bronze medal, after posting only the fifth ever triple–double in Olympics history, beating out Germany in the third–place game. Over 6 tournament games, Jokić averaged 18.8 points, 10.7 rebounds and 8.7 assists, while shooting 53.8% from the field. He also led all players in total points, rebounds, assists and steals, becoming the first player ever in Olympic tournament history to do so. For his performances, Jokić was named to the Olympics All-Star Five team.

On 28 July 2025, Jokić was included on Serbia's preliminary roster for EuroBasket 2025. On 30 August, Jokić scored a Serbian EuroBasket record 39 points, along with 10 rebounds, four assists, and three steals in an 84–80 win over hosts Latvia, sending Serbia to the knockout stage. However, Serbia's EuroBasket run ended in the Round of 16 for the second straight tournament, falling 92–86 to Finland despite a strong performance from Jokić, who finished with 33 points, 8 rebounds, 3 assists, and 3 steals. In 27 minutes per game, Jokić averaged 22.3 points, 9 rebounds, and 4.2 assists for the tournament, while shooting 66.2% from the field. He was named to the All-Tournament Second Team.

== Player profile ==
Standing 6 feet 11 inches (2.11 m) and weighing 284 pounds (129 kg), Jokić plays exclusively at the center position. Through the 2025–26 season, his career averages are 22.2 points, 11.1 rebounds, and 7.5 assists per game in the regular season, and 27.4 points, 12.4 rebounds, and 7.7 assists per game in the playoffs.

Jokić has been called the greatest passing "big man" in NBA history and has been described by some as the greatest passer of all time. As a playmaker, Jokić uses his size and field of view to set up his teammates for scores, often through a variety of no-looks and unique deliveries. His techniques, in particular his one-handed passes, have drawn comparisons to those of a water polo player. Playing at a slow and deliberate pace, Jokić often pauses upon receiving the ball to survey the floor for defensive mistakes and potential openings. His current and former teammates have stated that they always have to be ready to receive a pass because of how often Jokić passes at unusual angles, and that he has often hit unprepared players in the face with the ball during practice.

In addition to his playmaking ability, Jokić is also a versatile scorer, capable of effectively finishing in the paint as well as hitting jump shots from midrange and the three-point arc. During his tenth NBA season, Jokić shot .576 from the field and .417 from three-point range. His signature move, the "Sombor Shuffle" (coined by Nuggets play-by-play announcer Chris Marlowe after Jokić's hometown of Sombor), involves jumping off his right foot before launching a high-arching fadeaway. Jokić developed the move during his recovery from an ankle injury in 2017. The unorthodox move is difficult to contest and has drawn comparisons to Dirk Nowitzki's one-legged fadeaway.

Citing his game IQ and offensive creativity, many commentators have described Jokić as a "basketball genius". Jokic's ability to garner statistical dominance in multiple categories has led many people to place him among all-time greats, including Hall of Famers Kevin Garnett and Paul Pierce who equated him to Wilt Chamberlain.

Jokić was praised for becoming an elite NBA defender despite his significant athletic limitations. Jokić, who recorded the worst vertical jump (17 inches) among more than 1,000 NBA players tested in the P3 Applied Sports Science laboratory, finished first in the defensive plus-minus box for three consecutive seasons.

== Career statistics ==
Legend
GP	Games played	GS	Games started	MPG	Minutes per game
FG%	Field goal percentage	3P%	3-point field goal percentage	FT%	Free throw percentage
RPG	Rebounds per game	APG	Assists per game	SPG	Steals per game
BPG	Blocks per game	PPG	Points per game	**Bold**	Career high
†	Won an NBA championship	*	Led the league

=== NBA ===
==== Regular season ====
Year	Team	GP	GS	MPG	FG%	3P%	FT%	RPG	APG	SPG	BPG	PPG
2015–16	Denver	**80**	55	21.7	.512	.333	.811	7.0	2.4	1.0	.6	10.0
2016–17	Denver	73	59	27.9	.577	.324	.825	9.8	4.9	.8	.8	16.7
2017–18	Denver	75	73	32.6	.500	.396	.850	10.7	6.1	1.2	.8	18.5
2018–19	Denver	**80**	**80**	31.3	.511	.307	.821	10.8	7.3	1.4	.7	20.1
2019–20	Denver	73	73*	32.0	.528	.314	.817	9.7	7.0	1.2	.6	19.9
2020–21	Denver	72*	72*	34.6	.566	.388	**.868**	10.8	8.3	1.3	.7	26.4
2021–22	Denver	74	74	33.5	.583	.337	.810	**13.8**	7.9	1.5	**.9**	27.1
2022–23†	Denver	69	69	33.7	**.632**	.383	.822	11.8	9.8	1.3	.7	24.5
2023–24	Denver	79	79	34.6	.583	.359	.817	12.4	9.0	1.4	**.9**	26.4
2024–25	Denver	70	70	**36.7**	.576	**.417**	.800	12.7	10.2	**1.8**	.6	**29.6**
2025–26	Denver	65	65	34.8	.569	.380	.831	12.9*	**10.7***	1.4	.8	27.7
Career		810	769	32.0	.561	.362	.825	11.1	7.5	1.3	.7	22.2
All-Star		8	6	16.3	.647	.400	.000	5.4	4.3	.8	.1	6.0

==== Playoffs ====
Year	Team	GP	GS	MPG	FG%	3P%	FT%	RPG	APG	SPG	BPG	PPG
2019	Denver	14	14	39.7	.506	.393	.846	13.0	8.4	1.1	.9	25.1
2020	Denver	19	19	36.5	.519	.429	.835	9.8	5.7	1.1	.8	24.4
2021	Denver	10	10	34.5	.509	.377	.836	11.6	5.0	.6	.9	29.8
2022	Denver	5	5	34.2	**.575**	.278	.848	13.2	5.8	1.6	**1.0**	**31.0**
2023†	Denver	**20**	**20**	39.4	.548	**.461**	.799	**13.5**	**9.5**	1.1	**1.0**	30.0
2024	Denver	12	12	**40.2**	.545	.264	.901	13.4	8.7	1.4	.7	28.7
2025	Denver	14	14	**40.2**	.489	.380	.772	12.7	8.0	**2.0**	.9	26.2
2026	Denver	6	6	39.5	.446	.194	**.930**	13.2	**9.5**	1.0	.8	25.8
Career		100	100	38.4	.520	.373	.833	12.4	7.7	1.2	.9	27.4

=== ABA League ===
Year	Team	League	GP	MPG	FG%	3P%	FT%	RPG	APG	SPG	BPG	PPG
2013–14	Mega Basket	ABA League	26	25.0	.636	.221	.667	6.4	2.0	0.8	1.0	11.4
2014–15	Mega Basket	ABA League	24	30.5	.593	.346	.667	9.3	3.5	1.5	0.9	15.4

== Records ==
- Highest single-season player efficiency rating in NBA history (32.85).
- Highest single-season player box plus-minus in NBA history (13.72).
- Highest scoring overtime period in NBA History (18 points).
- Most career regular-season assists by a center, surpassing Kareem Abdul-Jabbar.
- Most regular season triple-doubles by a center in NBA history.
- Most playoff triple-doubles by a center in NBA history.
- Fastest triple-double in NBA history (14 minutes and 33 seconds) – official Guinness World Record.
- Highest scoring triple-double in NBA history (61 points).
- Only center to average a triple-double for a season.
- Only NBA player to finish top three in points, assists, rebounds, and steals per game in a season.
- Only NBA player to lead in both assists and rebounds per game in a season.
- Only NBA player to record a 30+ point, 20+ rebound, 20+ assist game.
- Only NBA player to be selected in the second round of the common era draft to win the MVP award.
- Only NBA player drafted outside the top-15 to win both Finals MVP and regular season MVP.
- Only NBA player to reach at least 2,000 points, 1,000 rebounds, and 500 assists in a single season.
- Only NBA player to average at least 20 points, 10 rebounds, and 9 assists per game on 60% field goal percentage in a single season.
- Only NBA player to average at least 25 points, 10 rebounds, and 8 assists per game on 52% field goal percentage in a single season.
- Only NBA player to average at least 25 points, 13 rebounds, and 7 assists per game in a single season.
- Only NBA player to lead his team in all five major statistics (points, rebounds, assists, steals, blocks) and field goal percentage in the same season.
- Only NBA player to record a 15+ assist triple-double while shooting 100% from the field.
- Only NBA player to record multiple 35+ point triple-doubles while shooting 90% from the field.
- Only NBA player to record 100+ points, 30+ rebounds and 15+ assists in a two-day span.
- Only NBA player to record multiple 30+ point triple-doubles without a turnover.
- Only NBA player since the ABA–NBA merger to post 35 points, 20 rebounds and 10 assists in multiple games in a single season.
- Only NBA player since the ABA–NBA merger to post 30 points, 20 rebounds and 10 assists in multiple games: Denver Nuggets, 2019–20, 2022–23, 2023–24, 2024–25 and 2025–26
- Only NBA player to post 30 points, 20 rebounds and 10 assists in multiple playoff games: Denver Nuggets, 2020–21 and 2022–23
- First player in NBA playoff history to total 175+ points, 65+ rebounds and 50+ assists over a 5-game span.
- First player in NBA playoff history to record 55+ points, 35+ rebounds, and 20+ assists over a 2-game span.
- First player in NBA history to average at least 25 points, 10 rebounds, and five assists through their first 50 career playoff games.
- First player in NBA playoff history to record a 20-point triple-double in four consecutive playoff games.
- Most assists by a player in their NBA Finals debut (14).
- Most assists by a center in an NBA Finals game (14).
- First player in NBA history to record 30+ points, 20+ rebounds, and 10+ assists in an NBA Finals game.
- First player in NBA history with 10-plus triple-doubles in 7 straight seasons.
- First player in NBA history to record 500+ points, 250+ rebounds and 150+ assists in a single postseason.
- First player in NBA history to lead all players in points, rebounds and assists in a single postseason.
- Second player in NBA history to lead both teams outright in points and assists in an NBA Finals debut.
  - Also achieved by Michael Jordan (Chicago Bulls, 1990–91)
- Second player in NBA history to record a triple-double in their NBA Finals debut:
  - Also achieved by Jason Kidd (New Jersey Nets, 2001–02)
- Second player in NBA history to record 4 consecutive triple-doubles in the same postseason: Denver Nuggets, 2022–23
  - Also achieved by Wilt Chamberlain (Philadelphia 76ers, 1966–67)
- Most triple-doubles in the same postseason (10): Denver Nuggets, 2022–23
- Most playoff games with 30+ points, 15+ rebounds and 10+ assists (5).
- Third player in NBA history to record 500+ points, 200+ rebounds & 150+ assists in a single postseason: Denver Nuggets, 2022–23
  - Also achieved by Larry Bird (Boston Celtics, 1986–87), and LeBron James (Cleveland Cavaliers, 2014–15, 2015–16 and 2017–18 and Los Angeles Lakers, 2019–20).
- Third player in NBA history to open the season with a triple-double as the reigning Finals MVP.
  - Also achieved by Magic Johnson (Los Angeles Lakers, 1982–83) and LeBron James (Cleveland Cavaliers, 2016–2017)
- Second player in NBA history to record 2,000 points, 1,000 rebounds and 800 assists in a single season, including the regular season and playoffs.
  - Also achieved by Oscar Robertson (Cincinnati Royals, 1961–62)
- Second player in NBA history with 300 points, 100 rebounds, and 75 assists through his first 10 games of a postseason.
  - Also achieved by Oscar Robertson (Cincinnati Royals, 1962–63)
- Second player in NBA history to record a triple-double on 100% shooting (Min. 10 FGA) in multiple games.
  - Also achieved by Wilt Chamberlain (Philadelphia 76ers, 1965–66 and 1966–67).
- Second player in NBA history to average a triple-double in multiple playoff series in a single postseason.
  - Also achieved by Wilt Chamberlain (Philadelphia 76ers, 1966–67)
- Second player in NBA history to average a triple-double in back-to-back playoff series.
  - Also achieved by Wilt Chamberlain (Philadelphia 76ers, 1966–67)
- Fourth player in NBA history to average a triple-double in the conference finals.
  - Also achieved by Wilt Chamberlain (Philadelphia 76ers, 1966–67), Magic Johnson (Los Angeles Lakers, 1982–83), Jason Kidd (New Jersey Nets, 2001–02)
- Third player in NBA history to average a 30-point triple-double in a playoff series.
  - Also achieved by LeBron James (Cleveland Cavaliers, 2016–17), Russell Westbrook (Oklahoma City Thunder, 2016–17)
- Third player in NBA history to average a triple-double for a season.
  - Also achieved by Oscar Robertson (Cincinnati Royals, 1961–62), Russell Westbrook (Oklahoma City Thunder, 2016–17, 2017–18, and 2018–19 and Washington Wizards, 2020–21)
- Second player in NBA history to average a triple-double in back-to-back seasons.
  - Russell Westbrook (Oklahoma City Thunder, 2016–17, 2017–18, and 2018–19 )
- Third player in NBA history to record 55+ points, 10+ rebounds and 5+ assists while shooting 75% from the field.
  - Also achieved by Wilt Chamberlain (Philadelphia 76ers, 1966–67), Luka Dončić (Dallas Mavericks, 2023–24)
- Sixth NBA player to lead his team in all five major statistics (points, rebounds, assists, steals, blocks) in the same season: Denver Nuggets, 2021–22
  - Also achieved by Dave Cowens (Boston Celtics, 1977–78), Scottie Pippen (Chicago Bulls, 1994–95), Kevin Garnett (Minnesota Timberwolves, 2002–03), LeBron James (Cleveland Cavaliers, 2008–09), and Giannis Antetokounmpo (Milwaukee Bucks, 2016–17)
- First player in Olympic basketball history to lead the Olympic tournament in points, rebounds and assists.

== Personal life ==
During Jokić's early years in Denver, he lived in a shared apartment with his ex-girlfriend and his two older brothers. Jokić married his long-time girlfriend, Natalija Mačešić, on October 24, 2020, in his hometown of Sombor. Jokić and Mačešić have two children together: daughter Ognjena, who was born in September 2021, and son Ignjat, who was born in November 2024.

Besides his native Serbian, he also speaks English fluently. He believes it is important to teach his children the Serbian language, as they live and attend school in the U.S.

Jokić is passionate about horse racing and his family owns a stable in his hometown. Jokić originally wanted to be a jockey but his father suggested he turn to basketball after he grew too big before his teens.

=== Religion ===
Jokić is a Serbian Orthodox Christian. He has gone viral in Serbian media on several occasions for correcting reporters wishing him a merry Christmas on December 25, always stating "It's not my Christmas." In the Serbian Orthodox Church, Christmas is celebrated on January 7, which is December 25 on the Julian calendar, the SOC's official liturgical calendar.

== See also ==
- List of NBA drafted players from Serbia
- List of NBA career assists leaders
- List of NBA career triple-double leaders
- List of NBA career field goal percentage leaders
- List of NBA annual rebounding leaders
- List of NBA annual assists leaders
- List of NBA single-game scoring leaders
- List of NBA single-game playoff scoring leaders
- List of NBA career playoff triple-double leaders
- List of NBA players who have spent their entire career with one franchise
- List of European basketball players in the United States
- NBA regular season records
- NBA post-season records
- List of Serbian NBA players
- List of Olympic medalists in basketball
- List of foreign NBA players
- KK Joker
