= NBA Awards =

American basketball awards show

NBA Awards on TNT
- Awarded for: Recognition in the NBA
- Country: United States
- Presented by: National Basketball Association
- Website: nba.com/NBAawards

Television/radio coverage
- Network: TNT

The NBA Awards was an annual awards show presented by the National Basketball Association (NBA) from 2017 to 2019, created in partnership with Turner Sports and produced by Dick Clark Productions to honor and recognize the league's top performers and accomplishments. Finalists for each individual award were announced during the NBA playoffs on NBA on TNT telecasts. Winners were revealed during the ceremony. Additionally, the open public could decide the winner for fan-voted categories online by voting through the league's official website and on social media.

The ceremony occurred in late June, following the conclusion of the NBA Finals, and were broadcast live on TNT. Hosting duties were shared with the Inside the NBA studio team. Due to the COVID-19 pandemic, the show was not held in 2020 and 2021. Since 2020, award winners were instead announced on TNT during their coverage of the playoffs. Concurrently, the original format was also met with backlash for lessening the value of the regular season and controversially being placed after the NBA Finals, casting doubts as to which games really mattered toward a player's award.

== List of ceremonies ==
Year	Season	Date	Venue	Host city	Host	NBA Most Valuable Player	Ref.
2017	2016–17	June 26	Basketball City at Pier 36	New York City	Drake	Russell Westbrook — Oklahoma City Thunder	
2018	2017–18	June 25	Barker Hangar	Santa Monica, California	Anthony Anderson	James Harden — Houston Rockets	
2019	2018–19	June 24	Barker Hangar	Santa Monica, California	Shaquille O'Neal	Giannis Antetokounmpo — Milwaukee Bucks	

== See also ==
- List of National Basketball Association awards
