= Santa Monica Airport =

Airport in Santa Monica, California

Santa Monica Airport Santa Monica Municipal Airport
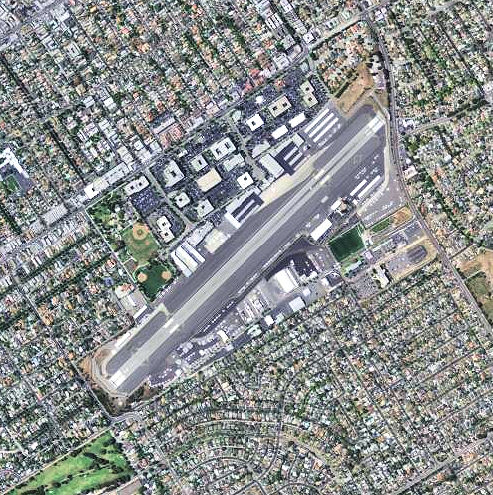
- 2006 USGS airphoto
- IATA: SMO; ICAO: KSMO; FAA LID: SMO

Summary
- Airport type: Public
- Owner: Santa Monica
- Operator: Santa Monica Airport Commission
- Serves: Greater Los Angeles
- Location: Santa Monica and Mar Vista, Los Angeles, California, U.S.
- Opened: April 15, 1923; 103 years ago
- Elevation AMSL: 54 m (177 ft)
- Coordinates: 34°00′57″N 118°27′05″W
- Website: smgov.net/departments/airport

Map
- Location of Santa Monica Airport

Runways
Direction	Length		Surface
Direction	m	ft	Surface
03/21	1,067	3,500	Asphalt

Helipads
Number	Length		Surface
Number	m	ft	Surface
H1	12	40	Asphalt
- Source: Federal Aviation Administration,

Santa Monica Airport (IATA: SMO, ICAO: KSMO, FAA LID: SMO) (Santa Monica Municipal Airport) is a general aviation airport largely in Santa Monica, California, United States, in the Greater Los Angeles area. It opened on April 15, 1923, making it one of the United States' oldest airports, and it has been one of the world's foremost general aviation airports (at one time, the busiest single-runway airport in the world). The airport is scheduled to close on December 31, 2028.

The airport is about 2 miles (3 km) from the Pacific Ocean (Santa Monica Bay) and 6 miles (10 km) north of Los Angeles International Airport (LAX). The FAA's National Plan of Integrated Airport Systems for 2009–2013 categorized it as a reliever airport. The city of Santa Monica is permitted to close the airport at the end of 2028. Santa Monica Airport covers a total of 215 acres (87 ha) of land.

One of the airport's former hangars, the Barker Hangar, is in use as a public events venue, and is commonly used for a number of televised awards ceremonies and concerts.

== History ==
=== Early history ===
Originally Clover Field, after World War I aviator 2nd lieutenant Greayer "Grubby" Clover, the airport was the home of the Douglas Aircraft company.

The first circumnavigation of the world by air, accomplished by the U.S. Army in a fleet of special custom built aircraft named the Douglas World Cruiser, took off from Clover Field on St. Patrick's Day, March 17, 1924, and returned there after some 28,000 miles (45,000 km).

The first Powder Puff Derby originated from Clover Field, and the field hosted aircraft of pioneer aviators Amelia Earhart, Howard Hughes, Wallace Beery, and Wiley Post, among others.

Cloverfield Boulevard — which confuses the field's naming for a crop of green rather than a fallen soldier — is a remnant of the airport's original name, as is the name of the Cloverfield film series, which derives its name from that road.

=== World War II ===
Clover Field was once the site of the Army's 40th Division Aviation, 115th Observation Squadron and became a Distribution Center after World War II. Douglas Aircraft Company was headquartered adjacent to Clover Field. Among other important aircraft built there, Douglas manufactured the entire Douglas Commercial "DC" series of reciprocating-engine-powered airliners including the DC-1 (a prototype), DC-2, DC-3, DC-4, DC-5 (only 12 built), DC-6 and DC-7. During World War II, B-18 Bolo and B-18A bombers and thousands of C-47 (military version of the DC-3) and C-54 (later the civilian DC-4) military transports were built at Santa Monica, during which time the airport area was cleverly disguised from the air with the construction of a false "town" (built with the help of Hollywood craftsmen) suspended atop it.

=== Post-World War II ===
==== Transition to general aviation reliever airport ====
In 1958, Donald Douglas asked the city to lengthen the airport's runway so that Douglas Aircraft could produce and test the DC-8 there. The city, bowing to objections of residents, refused to do so, and Douglas closed a plant that had employed 44,000 workers in World War II, moving airliner production to Long Beach Airport.

With the departure of Douglas, the airport became a principal general aviation "reliever" airport for the Greater Los Angeles area, accommodating mostly business aircraft, training aircraft, and personal planes.

In 1968, the Federal Aviation Administration (FAA), in exchange for an airport-development grant, contracted with the City of Santa Monica to ensure the airport land would be used for aviation services, including fuel, maintenance and fixed base operations, until 1988.

==== Battles to limit or close the airport ====
Donald H. Brandsen, a resident of Santa Monica, worked tirelessly for 25 years, until his death in 2013, to save the Santa Monica Airport.

It has remained open for 107 years, but after December 31, 2028, pursuant to the terms of a 2017 consent decree, the City may close the airport.

Starting in the late 1970s, the airport became the object of numerous political battles seeking to limit or close the airport—ultimately becoming a key precedent for various such airport battles across the nation—pitting local area residents, land developers, and local government against airport users and general aviation industry organizations, sometimes supported by the FAA.

Initially, residents off the departure end of Runway 21 complained of noise, and the Santa Monica city government imposed a noise limit of 100 decibels on departing aircraft. Airport supporters, including airport users, the General Aviation Manufacturers Association (GAMA), National Business Aircraft Association (NBAA), and Aircraft Owners and Pilots Association (AOPA), fought the city in federal court.

However, in their first conflict, the U.S. Ninth Circuit Court of Appeals ruled that a city could impose reasonable restrictions on airport activity and noise. The city responded by preparing 85 decibel restrictions, which threatened to oust most aircraft from the field. It also began other actions against the airport, including evictions of most aviation operators.

Further, in 1981, the airport's 215 acres (87 hectares) occupied five percent of the usable land of Santa Monica, in the heart of the burgeoning population of the Greater Los Angeles area, making it highly desirable real estate for development. One study indicated that intense development of the airport land could double the city's revenue.

Additionally, the city was mostly populated by apartment renters, and rent-cost control was a primary motivating factor in city elections at the time, with the result that liberal candidates who had expressed the desire to close the airport, and/or develop new low-cost housing, were elected to six of seven city council seats.

Battles between opponents and defenders of the airport have continued, with various court decisions and FAA legal opinions emerging favoring one side or the other. However, the airport remained open throughout the rest of the 20th century and into the 21st.

In 2009, with jet traffic increasing at SMO, studies by UCLA and the South Coast Air Quality Management District warned that SMO was a source of abnormally high air pollution in the area, particularly for ultrafine particles that threatened the health of children and the elderly, and those with respiratory and cardiovascular diseases. In neighborhoods downwind of the airport, ultrafine particles were measured at 2.5 to 10 times the normal amount. The FAA attempted remediation by controlling the timing of engine run-ups and positioning of aircraft, but some residents complained that the measures failed to resolve the problem.

In 2017, the FAA agreed to let the city shorten the runway from 4,925 feet (1,501 m) to 3,500 feet (1,100 m)—effectively blocking most jets from using the airport—and allowing the city to completely close the airport by December 31, 2028. A legal challenge to the agreement, backed by the NBAA, failed in court.

==== 21st-century political/social/cultural events ====
In 2022, the Frieze Art Fair announced that its Los Angeles edition would move to the airport in 2023, occupying a massive temporary tent designed by Kulapat Yantrasast’s architecture firm WHY and hosting more than 100 exhibitors in addition to expanded programming and activations.

U.S. Presidents Donald Trump (in 2019) and Joe Biden (in 2022 and 2023) both landed at SMO during visits to the area—arriving in their Marine One helicopter, after first arriving at Los Angeles International Airport aboard Air Force One.

== Operations ==
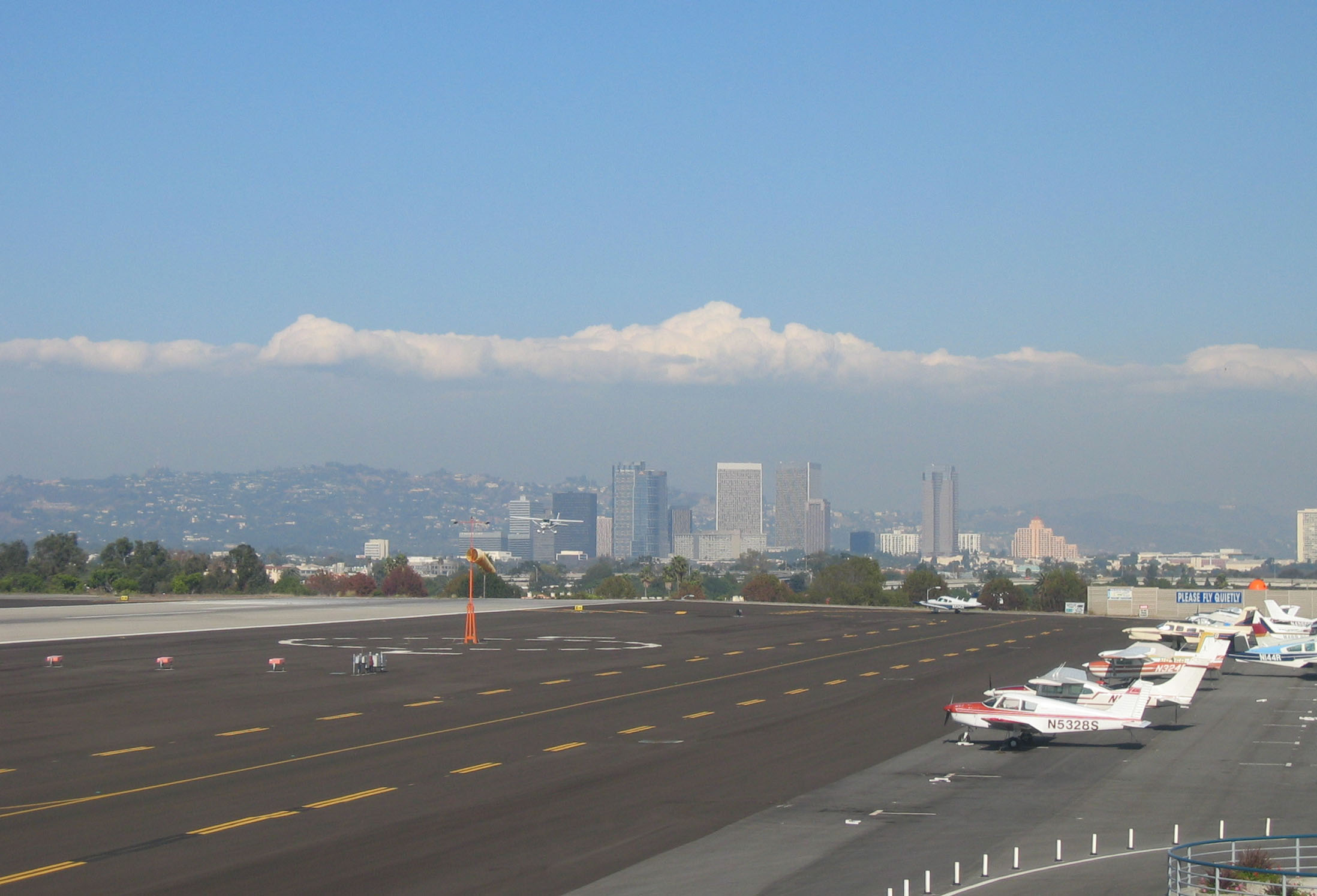
Facing east toward Century City and landing aircraft

Airport diagram of Santa Monica Municipal Airport (KSMO, SMO), after the runway length change in 2017

The airport has a control tower. On average, it handled 296 operations a day (for the 12 months – ended July 2011). Traffic decreased to 83,381 annual operations in 2014.

As the Santa Monica Airport is one of many general aviation airports in the nation that is surrounded on some sides by residential development, the City of Santa Monica aggressively enforces one of the most stringent noise ordinances in the nation. In addition to responding to the community's noise concerns and enforcing the city's Aircraft Noise Ordinance, which includes a maximum allowable noise level, curfew hours and certain operational limitations, airport staff is involved in a variety of supplementary activities intended to reduce the overall impact of aircraft operations on the residential areas surrounding the airport. The following procedures and limitations are enforced in accordance with the noise ordinance. Violations may result in the imposition of fines and/or exclusion from Santa Monica Airport.

- Maximum noise level: A maximum noise level of 95.0 dBA Single Event Noise Exposure Level, measured at noise monitor sites 1,500 feet from each end of the runway, is enforced 24 hours a day, 7 days a week. There are no additional noise monitoring stations along the flight pattern, which is routed entirely over residential neighborhoods.
- Night departure curfew: No takeoffs or engine starts are permitted between 11 pm and 7 am Monday through Friday, or until 8 am on weekends. Exceptions are allowed for bona fide medical or public safety emergencies only.
- Operational limitations: Touch-and-go, stop-and-go, and low approaches are prohibited on weekends, holidays, and weekdays from one half-hour after sunset until 7 am the following day.

In addition, there are numerous recommended noise abatement procedures and limitations that have been incorporated into the airport's Fly Neighborly Program and included in the program's outreach materials.

The aviation aspects of aircraft operations at the Santa Monica Airport and use of the nation's airspace is regulated by the federal government through the Federal Aviation Administration (FAA). The city is jurisdictionally preempted by federal law from establishing or enforcing new local laws that would affect aircraft operations or the use of airspace around the Santa Monica Airport.

The Museum of Flying at the airport houses a collection of historic aircraft. A new facility was built on the south side of the airport and is now open. The restaurant The Hump was closed in 2010 after its chef and owner were arrested for serving whale meat.

One of the airport's oldest buildings, next to the restored Douglas DC-3, hosts the U.S. Civil Air Patrol's Clover Field Composite Squadron 51.

=== Landing fees ===
On August 1, 2005, the Santa Monica City Council implemented a landing fee program (Resolution No. 9855) for all aircraft based on a uniform rate of $2.07 per 1000 pounds of maximum certificated gross landing weight. Since the Santa Monica Airport receives no federal, state or local funding to operate, the landing fees fill the gap between other airport revenue and the cost of operations. On April 13, 2013, the rates were increased to $5.48 per 1,000 pounds of maximum certificated gross landing weight.

=== Airport Park ===
Airport Park opened as an 8.3-acre (3.4 ha) public park on recaptured aviation lands at the southeast corner of the airport. The park features a synthetic turf soccer field, open green space and off-leash dog area.

=== Barker Hangar ===
Santa Monica Airport includes Barker Hangar, a former aircraft hangar that was converted to a 35,000-square-foot (3,300 m^{2}) entertainment venue. The hangar was originally built in 1954 by Bill Lear, inventor and founder of the jet manufacturer Learjet. He intended to use the hangar to build a private fleet of jets, but was denied permission by the city. Lear thus sold the building to Pacific Airmotive, who then rented the space to private jet owners. After Pacific Airmotive went out of business in 1969, the hangar was sold to former Pacific Airmotive engineer James Barker, who then used the building for aviation-contract engineering. After he died of leukemia in 1986, his daughter Judi converted the hangar to the present-day events venue.

The hangar has hosted a variety of events, including boxing matches, art presentations, movies, concerts, wine and food festivals, and trade shows. The 2005 album INXS: Live at Barker Hangar is a live recording of a 1993 concert held at the hangar by Australian rock band INXS. Award shows hosted at the Barker Hangar include the MTV Movie & TV Awards, the NBA Awards, and the People's Choice Awards. It was also used as a small-scale supermarket set for the 2020 version of Supermarket Sweep.

== Future ==
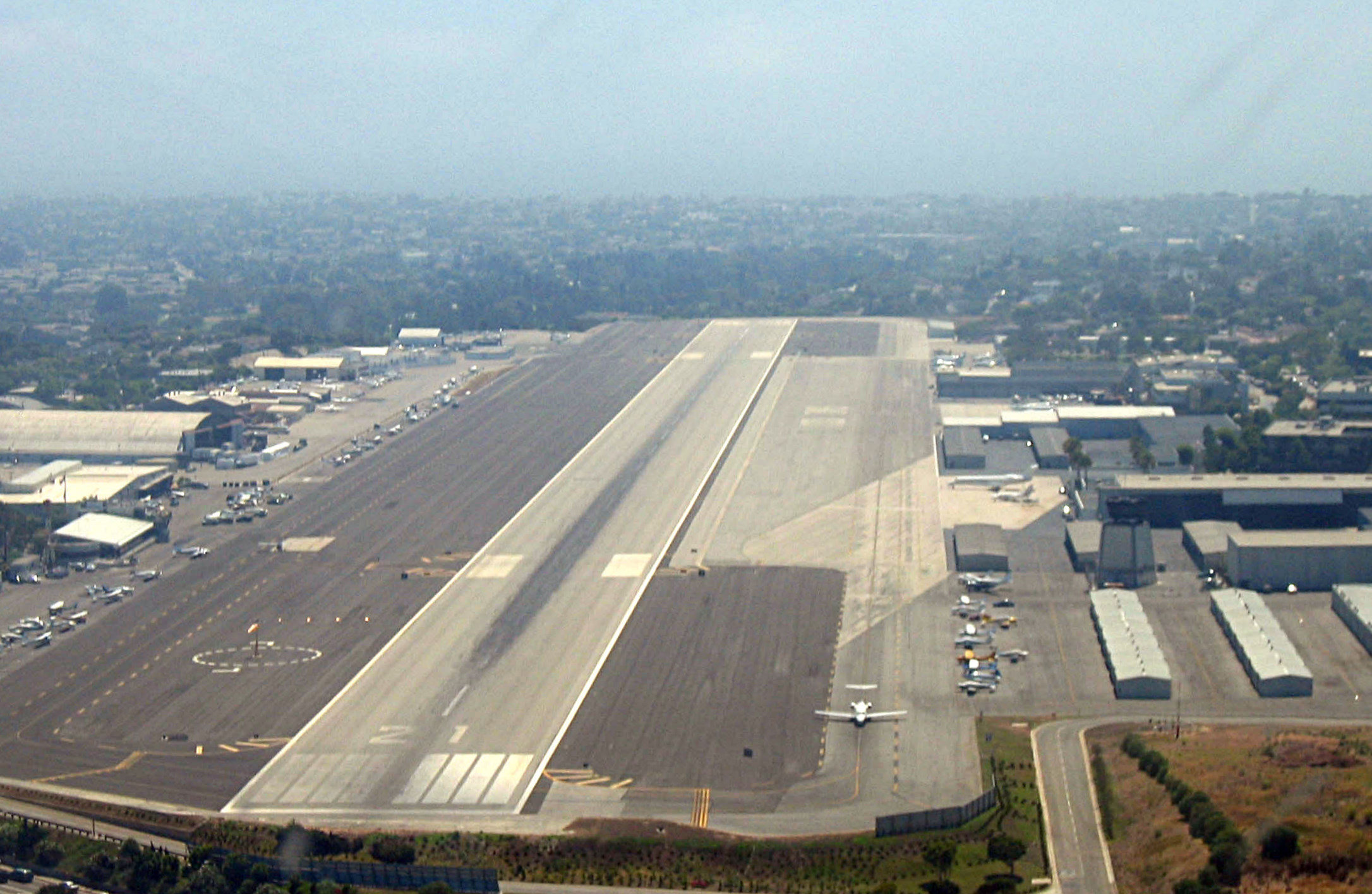
Approaching Santa Monica Airport from the east (2005)

The city has invited the public to offer input regarding the airport's future. The city of Santa Monica sued the federal government seeking to void a 1948 agreement in which the city agreed to keep the land for aviation use in perpetuity in exchange for title to the property. On February 13, 2014, Judge John F. Walter dismissed the lawsuit, ruling that the city's "quiet title action" was barred by the statute of limitations and that the other issues would not be ripe for a judicial decision until the city decides definitively whether it will close the airport.

The city appealed on October 14, 2014, citing the expiration of the 1948 agreement, after which FAA had agreed to release control of the city-owned parcel. The appeal also noted that the FAA's leasehold, granted during World War II, was for that purpose alone, and could not be transformed into a larger interest (such as a permanent taking of city land by FAA demanding use of the land for air-travel purposes in perpetuity). There has yet been no finally conclusive legal decision, nor any preclusive agreement reached between the city and the aviation interests/FAA. An array of issues exists, which are still hotly debated in local, state, and national political arenas – as well as the courts.

The consensus opinion is the many issues will ultimately be decided in the courts, with the dates of transfer-of-control being the central issues. In November 2014, voters passed the city-council-sponsored Measure LC, with a 60% "yes" vote. Measure LC places limitations on land use once the airport is closed. It proscribes commercial development, limiting development of the land to "public parks, recreational facilities or open space." However, it allows the city council to decide what constitutes such facilities and to replace existing structures without voter approval.

One reason cited for public support of airport closure is an alleged threat to safety, despite no airport incidents having caused a ground fatality in the airport's neighborhood in over a century. On November 26, 1993, an aircraft piloted by a student pilot crashed into an apartment building adjacent to a gasoline filling station in a densely populated area of the city, resulting in three fatalities (though none on the ground).

The western parcel of the land on which the airport sits was to revert to city control, on June 15, 2015, of this sub-parcel of the city-owned land, by expiry of prior city-FAA agreements. One tactic recommended by airport opponents is to demolish the portion of the runway which sits upon this land, with the primary justification being safety. That is, at minimum, the allowance of a buffer between the end of the runway and residential houses – currently 300 feet away – more preferably with the installation of aircraft-arrestors to prevent any runway overshoot from rolling past the runway and into the residential homes. The FAA offered such an arrestor system to the city in 2008, but this offer was rebuffed.

On January 28, 2017, it was announced that Santa Monica city officials and the Federal Aviation Administration had reached an agreement to close the Santa Monica Airport on December 31, 2028, and return 227 acres of aviation land to the city for eventual redevelopment. It is anticipated the airport land will be redeveloped into areas for parks, open space, recreation, education and/or cultural use.

To reduce jet traffic, the city shortened the runway from 4,973 feet to 3,500 feet by repainting the runway and moving some navigational aids. The runway shortening was completed on December 23, 2017.

In June 2026, the city received a grant of about $500,000 to fund the planning and design process for the first 20 acres of park space.

== Airline and destinations ==
Airlines	Destinations	Refs
JSX	Las Vegas, Oakland, Scottsdale; Seasonal: Napa	

== Accidents ==
- On Labor Day weekend in 1989, a P-51 Mustang crashed into a home on Wade Street near Brooklake Street in Mar Vista. The pilot and passenger were both injured. During take-off, a piston rod broke, causing complete and sudden loss of power. The pilot, Robert E. Guilford, opted to try a return to the airport rather than ditch in the ocean as it was full of Labor Day beachgoers. The P-51 crashed into the house and then onto the street, spilling aviation fuel but never catching on fire.
- On November 26, 1993, about 1042 hours Pacific Standard Time, a SIAI-Marchetti SF.260, N126MJ, was destroyed during a collision sequence with telephone lines, trees, and an apartment building in a residential area of Santa Monica, California. Visual meteorological conditions prevailed for the personal flight and no flight plan was filed. The ATP rated instructor pilot succumbed to his injuries 15 days after the accident. The student rated pilot and the third seat passenger were both fatally injured. The flight originated at the Santa Monica airport at 1037 as a local area flight.
- In 1994, the pilot of a single-engine Piper Saratoga died when a fuel system misconfiguration led to an in-flight engine shutdown. The aircraft stalled in a subsequent 180 degree turn for a forced emergency landing and struck the ground, which resulted in a post-crash fire.
- On March 28, 2001, an inexperienced pilot rented a Cessna 172 at the airport and subsequently lost control of the aircraft over the Pacific Ocean upon encountering dark, instrument meteorological conditions. Three were killed.
- On November 13, 2001, the pilot of a twin-engine Cessna failed to remove the gust locks prior to startup and two were killed when the aircraft overran the runway after an attempt to abort the takeoff was unsuccessful.
- On March 13, 2006, game-show host Peter Tomarken and his wife Kathleen died when his Beechcraft Bonanza crashed during climb-out from the airport. The aircraft had engine trouble and attempted to turn back before crashing into Santa Monica Bay.
- On January 13, 2008, a home-built aircraft ran off the end of runway 21 after a brake failure, jumped over the hillside, landing on a service road. The three passengers on board were not hurt, although the kit-built aircraft was damaged severely. The runway was closed for 20 minutes.
- On January 28, 2009, a single-engine SIAI-Marchetti SF.260 lost power following takeoff and attempted to return to the airport. The aircraft struck the ground on the north side of runway 21 and caught fire, killing pilot Paulo Emanuele, general manager of Airliners.net, and passenger Martin Schaedel, an Internet entrepreneur. Investigators determined a probable cause was the pilot's failure to select the proper fuel tank for takeoff, which resulted in a loss of engine power.
- On August 2, 2009, a Rutan Long-EZ experienced engine failure after takeoff. The pilot attempted to turn back to the runway, but crashed on the taxiway in the process of landing. The pilot, flying alone, was severely injured and the airplane was destroyed.
- On July 1, 2010, a Cessna 152, crashed into the Penmar Golf Course shortly after take-off. The pilot was killed.
- On August 29, 2011, a student pilot operating a small plane crashed into a home at 21st Street and Navy Street after take-off. The pilot was soloing and encountered a problem with his airspeed indicator and returned but used too much runway for a safe landing. Having been instructed by the tower to perform a go-around, the pilot obliged but stalled the aircraft into a residence. The pilot was seriously injured and two of the three painters performing work on the home suffered minor injuries. The aircraft was totaled.
- On September 29, 2013, a twin-engine Cessna Citation business jet that had just landed veered off the runway and crashed into a hangar, causing the hangar to collapse and setting fire to several other hangars. The pilot and his adult son were both killed.
- On March 5, 2015, actor Harrison Ford's 1942 Ryan PT-22 Recruit began having engine trouble at 2:25 pm right after take-off from Santa Monica Airport and the pilot attempted a 180 degree turn to return to the airport. The aircraft did not have sufficient airspeed and altitude to complete the emergency maneuver and was forced to make an emergency landing on the Penmar Golf Course a few hundred yards from the runway. Ford was attended at the crash scene by a spine surgeon who was practicing at the golf course and assisted in extricating Ford from the aircraft in case it caught fire.
- On September 8, 2022, at 4:26 p.m. PDT, a Sport Cruiser housing a CFI and a student, stalled and crashed into runway 21 on landing, killing both occupants.

== See also ==
- California World War II Army Airfields
- J.C. Barthel, who planned to establish "an aerial passenger service," 1922
- Santa Monica Army Air Forces Redistribution Center
- California during World War II
- List of airports in the Los Angeles area
- East Hampton Airport - Facing similar pressures to close
