= Sager Strong Award =

Former Annual award by the National Basketball Association (2017–2019)

- Presented by: NBA Awards
- First award: 2017
- Final award: 2019

The Sager Strong Award was an annual award given by the National Basketball Association between 2017 and 2019. It was presented to "an individual who has been a trailblazer while exemplifying courage, faith, compassion, and grace." The award was created to honor the longtime NBA sideline reporter Craig Sager (1951–2016), and the recipient received a replica of the colorful sports coat that Sager wore when accepting the 2016 Jimmy V Award.

== Recipients ==
Season	Name	Position	Nationality	Team	Ref.
2016–17	Monty Williams	Vice President	United States	San Antonio Spurs	
2017–18	Dikembe Mutombo	—N/a	DR Congo	—N/a	
2018–19	Robin Roberts	—N/a	United States	—N/a	
