= NBA Lifetime Achievement Award =

National Basketball Association award

- Sport: Basketball
- League: National Basketball Association (NBA)
- Awarded for: Given to an NBA player with extraordinary success on and off the court

History
- First award: 2016–17
- Most recent: Larry Bird; Magic Johnson (2019)

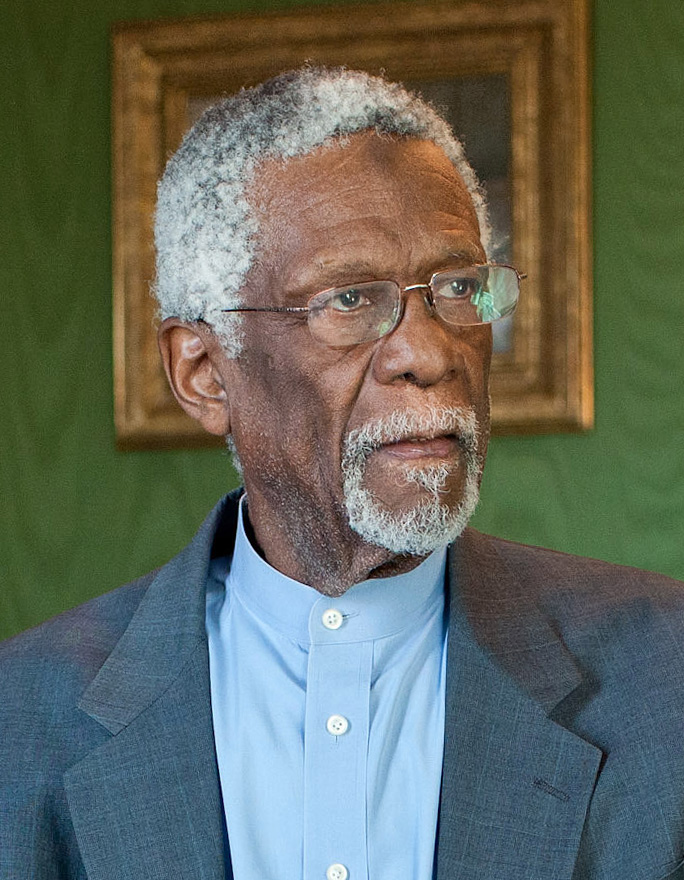
Bill Russell was awarded the NBA Lifetime Achievement Award in 2017

The NBA's Lifetime Achievement Award is an annual National Basketball Association (NBA) award given to a player who exemplified extraordinary success on and off the court in the NBA.

The inaugural recipient of the award was Bill Russell: a Presidential Medal of Freedom recipient, Naismith Memorial Basketball Hall of Famer and 11-time NBA Champion with the Boston Celtics. The 2019 award was shared between two players: Larry Bird and Magic Johnson. Every recipient of the award has been elected to the Naismith Memorial Basketball Hall of Fame prior to receiving the award. As of 2019, all winners have been American.

== Winners ==
| * | Elected to the Naismith Memorial Basketball Hall of Fame |

| Season | Player | Position | Nationality | Team | Ref. |
|---|---|---|---|---|---|
| 2016–17 | Bill Russell* | Center | United States | Boston Celtics | |
| 2017–18 | Oscar Robertson* | Guard | United States | Cincinnati Royals and Milwaukee Bucks | |
| 2018–19 | Larry Bird* | Forward | United States | Boston Celtics | |
| 2018–19 | Magic Johnson* | Guard | United States | Los Angeles Lakers | |

== See also ==
- List of National Basketball Association awards
- List of lifetime achievement awards
- List of NBA regular season records
