= 2024 United States men's Olympic basketball team =

- Head coach: Steve Kerr
- Scoring leader: Stephen Curry 14.8
- Rebounding leader: LeBron James 6.8
- Assists leader: LeBron James 8.5
- Biggest win: 35 vs. Brazil
Home	Away

The men's national basketball team of the United States competed at the 2024 Summer Olympics in Paris, France, and won the gold medal. They qualified for the Olympics as one of the top two FIBA Basketball World Cup finishers from the Americas in 2023. It was the fifth consecutive Olympic gold medal for the Americans, who defeated France in the gold-medal game for the second straight Olympics.

The team had been given the nickname "the Avengers" by some media outlets due to their high profile roster, which was assembled after the 2023 U.S. World Cup squad failed to medal. The Olympic squad included four National Basketball Association (NBA) players who have won its league most valuable player (MVP) award—LeBron James, Kevin Durant, Stephen Curry and Joel Embiid—an Olympic first. After the conclusion of the tournament, James was named the FIBA Men's Olympics MVP and was selected to the FIBA Men's Olympics All-Star Five along with Curry.

== Timeline ==
- January 23, 2024 41 roster finalists announced
- April 17 Initial 12-man roster named
- July 5 Start of training camp
- July 10–22 Exhibition games
- July 28 – August 11 2024 Summer Olympics

== Roster ==
After the 2023 U.S. World Cup team finished in fourth place, the first time since 1970 that Team USA failed to medal in consecutive World Cups, USA Basketball executive director Grant Hill and head coach Steve Kerr tried to persuade more experienced players to join the Olympic team. The NBA career scoring leader, LeBron James, reportedly committed the day after the United States lost in the World Cup bronze medal game, and he recruited other players to join the team. Kevin Durant, who was already the career leading scorer in U.S. men's Olympic history, said that he "kind of committed" to the Olympic team during the 2022–23 NBA season, when he was with the Brooklyn Nets, and Hill and Kerr were in Brooklyn to convince him to play in the World Cup. According to Durant, after James "started texting everybody ... I kind of knew we were all going to get together and that this was a special time". Stephen Curry, the NBA's all-time 3-point scoring leader, said he "pretty much softly committed" in 2022, when he and Kerr, his head coach with the Golden State Warriors, were returning from Boston after winning the NBA Finals over the Boston Celtics. Curry was joking with Kerr that the Olympics was "the only thing I hadn't done". In 2023, James texted Curry about playing. For four consecutive seasons from 2015 to 2018, while James was with the Cleveland Cavaliers, he and Curry faced each other in the NBA Finals, with the Warriors claiming three titles. Durant, who was Curry's teammate for two of those championships, said that joining the Olympic team "was a no-brainer, especially when [James and Curry] committed."

Seven players on the 2024 team had prior Olympic experience, a U.S. record. Durant, Bam Adebayo, Devin Booker, Jrue Holiday, and Jayson Tatum returned from the 2020 Olympic team that won gold, while James and Anthony Davis won gold in earlier Olympics. Anthony Edwards, the team's youngest player at 22, and Tyrese Haliburton were on the 2023 World Cup squad, while Curry won gold twice at the FIBA World Championships (previous name of the World Cup). The 2024 roster had won a combined 14 gold medals in major international events. It was the oldest U.S. men's basketball team, averaging 30 years and 9 months when the Games started, surpassing the 1996 team's average of 29 years, 10 months old. Hill said that he felt obliged to include James (age 39), Curry (36), and Durant (35) after they publicly committed to playing in the 2024 Olympics.

The American squad included 11 players who had been NBA All-Stars, three former NBA Finals MVPs and seven players who had won NBA championships. They had fewer role players than past U.S. Olympic squads as Hill instead focused on talent. He was concerned with the variation in talent among the Olympic opponents. Canada and South Sudan were deep in guards, while Germany and France were laden with big men. Joel Embiid, who had the opportunity to play for his native country Cameroon as well as France, was motivated to choose the United States because of his son, who was born an American in 2020. He also said that he had "some concern" with France and stated, "Comfort level was huge. I always say I'm going to be where I'm wanted and these guys wanted me." Embiid's addition addressed the lack of size and defense on the 2023 World Cup team. However, he had missed over half of the 2023–24 NBA regular season and played with a knee injury in the playoffs.

Six-time All-Star Kawhi Leonard had missed the final eight regular-season games for the Los Angeles Clippers and four of their six first-round playoff games with a right knee inflammation. On July 10, 2024, before Team USA's first exhibition, Leonard was replaced on the roster by the Celtics' Derrick White, who was coming off consecutive NBA All-Defensive Second Team selections and played on the 2019 World Cup team. According to Clippers president of basketball operations Lawrence Frank, Leonard wanted to stay with the squad, and the Clippers were supportive, but it was USA Basketball's decision. "I really wish they would have given Kawhi more time", said Frank. With Leonard, the United States team would have included 11 players who were All-Stars in 2024 as well as a combined 84 All-Star selections, the most ever in the Olympics. They also would have been the second Olympic team filled entirely with former All-Stars, joining the 1996 U.S. team. Three-time All-Star Jaylen Brown of the Celtics believed that he was passed over as Leonard's replacement in part due to Nike's influence. Brown had been critical of the company in the past, and White, Brown's Boston teammate, is a Nike-sponsored athlete.

United States men's national basketball team – 2024 Summer Olympics roster
Players
Coaches

Pos.	No.	Name	Age – Date of birth	Height	Club	Ctr.
PG	4	Stephen Curry	36 – 14 March 1988	1.88 m (6 ft 2 in)	Golden State Warriors	(United States)
SG	5	Anthony Edwards	22 – 5 August 2001	1.93 m (6 ft 4 in)	Minnesota Timberwolves	(United States)
F	6	LeBron James (C)	39 – 30 December 1984	2.06 m (6 ft 9 in)	Los Angeles Lakers	(United States)
F	7	Kevin Durant	35 – 29 September 1988	2.11 m (6 ft 11 in)	Phoenix Suns	(United States)
G	8	Derrick White	30 – 2 July 1994	1.93 m (6 ft 4 in)	Boston Celtics	(United States)
PG	9	Tyrese Haliburton	24 – 29 February 2000	1.96 m (6 ft 5 in)	Indiana Pacers	(United States)
F	10	Jayson Tatum	26 – 3 March 1998	2.03 m (6 ft 8 in)	Boston Celtics	(United States)
C	11	Joel Embiid	30 – 16 March 1994	2.13 m (7 ft 0 in)	Philadelphia 76ers	(United States)
G	12	Jrue Holiday	34 – 12 June 1990	1.93 m (6 ft 4 in)	Boston Celtics	(United States)
F/C	13	Bam Adebayo	27 – 18 July 1997	2.06 m (6 ft 9 in)	Miami Heat	(United States)
F/C	14	Anthony Davis	31 – 11 March 1993	2.08 m (6 ft 10 in)	Los Angeles Lakers	(United States)
SG	15	Devin Booker	27 – 30 October 1996	1.98 m (6 ft 6 in)	Phoenix Suns	(United States)

Head coach

- (United States) Steve Kerr

Assistant coach(es)

- (United States) Mark Few
- (United States) Tyronn Lue
- (United States) Erik Spoelstra

Legend

- (C) Team captain
- Club – describes last
  club before the tournament
- Age – describes age
  on 27 July 2024

Roster

The following were also candidates to make the team:

Earlier candidates
Player	NBA team (Note: Team at the time player was a candidate)	Added	Removed	Reason
Jarrett Allen	Cleveland Cavaliers	January 23, 2024	April 17, 2024	Not named to 12-man roster
Paolo Banchero	Orlando Magic	January 23, 2024	April 17, 2024	Not named to 12-man roster
Desmond Bane	Memphis Grizzlies	January 23, 2024	April 17, 2024	Not named to 12-man roster
Scottie Barnes	Toronto Raptors	January 23, 2024	April 17, 2024	Not named to 12-man roster
Mikal Bridges	Brooklyn Nets	January 23, 2024	April 17, 2024	Not named to 12-man roster
Jaylen Brown	Boston Celtics	January 23, 2024	April 17, 2024	Not named to 12-man roster
Jalen Brunson	New York Knicks	January 23, 2024	April 17, 2024	Not named to 12-man roster
Jimmy Butler	Miami Heat	January 23, 2024	April 17, 2024	Not named to 12-man roster
Alex Caruso	Chicago Bulls	January 23, 2024	April 17, 2024	Not named to 12-man roster
De'Aaron Fox	Sacramento Kings	January 23, 2024	April 17, 2024	Not named to 12-man roster
Paul George	Los Angeles Clippers	January 23, 2024	April 17, 2024	Not named to 12-man roster
Aaron Gordon	Denver Nuggets	January 23, 2024	April 17, 2024	Not named to 12-man roster
James Harden	Los Angeles Clippers	January 23, 2024	April 17, 2024	Not named to 12-man roster
Josh Hart	New York Knicks	January 23, 2024	April 17, 2024	Not named to 12-man roster
Tyler Herro	Miami Heat	January 23, 2024	April 17, 2024	Not named to 12-man roster
Chet Holmgren	Oklahoma City Thunder	January 23, 2024	April 17, 2024	Not named to 12-man roster
Brandon Ingram	New Orleans Pelicans	January 23, 2024	April 17, 2024	Not named to 12-man roster
Kyrie Irving	Dallas Mavericks	January 23, 2024	April 17, 2024	Not named to 12-man roster
Jaren Jackson Jr.	Memphis Grizzlies	January 23, 2024	April 17, 2024	Not named to 12-man roster
Cameron Johnson	Brooklyn Nets	January 23, 2024	April 17, 2024	Not named to 12-man roster
Walker Kessler	Utah Jazz	January 23, 2024	April 17, 2024	Not named to 12-man roster
Damian Lillard	Milwaukee Bucks	January 23, 2024	April 17, 2024	Not named to 12-man roster
Donovan Mitchell	Cleveland Cavaliers	January 23, 2024	April 17, 2024	Not named to 12-man roster
Chris Paul	Golden State Warriors	January 23, 2024	April 17, 2024	Not named to 12-man roster
Bobby Portis	Milwaukee Bucks	January 23, 2024	April 17, 2024	Not named to 12-man roster
Austin Reaves	Los Angeles Lakers	January 23, 2024	April 17, 2024	Not named to 12-man roster
Duncan Robinson	Miami Heat	January 23, 2024	April 17, 2024	Not named to 12-man roster
Trae Young	Atlanta Hawks	January 23, 2024	April 17, 2024	Not named to 12-man roster
Kawhi Leonard	Los Angeles Clippers	January 23, 2024	July 10, 2024	Injured

== Exhibition games ==
The United States was 5–0 in exhibition games but did not look unbeatable. They won convincingly over Canada and Serbia; led Australia by 25 before the Aussies came back to make it close; and were at risk of losing the final two games against South Sudan and Germany, both in London, but LeBron James's late-game performances led Team USA to victories. He scored 13 of the team's 17 combined points in the final four minutes of both contests. According to head coach Steve Kerr, the U.S. was outplayed "effort- and energy-wise" in the two games, and he felt that they played slowly and did not use their depth to their advantage.

Kevin Durant did not play in any of the games after suffering a calf strain in a workout before training camp. After coming out of training camp slowly and appearing out of shape, Joel Embiid steadily improved with each outing.

=== Canada ===
FS1

July 10, 2024

Boxscore

Canada	72–86	United States
Scoring by quarter: 21–14, 12–27, 21–28, 18–17
Pts: Barrett 12; Rebs: three players 5 Asts: three players 3		Pts: Edwards 13; Rebs: Davis 11; Asts: Haliburton 6

T-Mobile Arena
Las Vegas, Nevada

The United States won their exhibition opener 86–72 over Canada. Anthony Edwards led all scorers with 13 points. The Americans began the game shooting 0 for 6, but overcame an early 11–1 deficit to lead 41–33 at halftime. They expanded their lead to 69–54 after three quarters. Team USA played without Durant and Derrick White, who had not joined the team yet after replacing Kawhi Leonard on the squad.

=== Australia ===
FS1

July 15, 2024

Boxscore

Australia	92–98	United States
Scoring by quarter: 21–32, 16–21, 24–23, 31–22
Pts: Landale 20; Rebs: Giddey 8 Asts: Giddey 8		Pts: Davis 17; Rebs: Davis 14; Asts: Tatum 5

Etihad Arena
Abu Dhabi, UAE

Anthony Davis scored 17 points and had 14 rebounds in Team USA's 98–92 win over Australia. The Americans were up by 24 points in the third quarter, but the Australians pulled to within five points with 5:05 remaining in the game after outscoring the United States 39–21. Twice Australia cut the deficit to four points, but Devin Booker was a perfect four of four on free throws in the final eight seconds to secure the win.

Kerr started two new players—Edwards and Jayson Tatum. The team committed 18 turnovers and allowed 13 offensive rebounds. White joined the team in Abu Dhabi and practiced, but did not play in the game.

=== Serbia ===
FS1

July 17, 2024

Boxscore

Serbia	79–105	United States
Scoring by quarter: 28–28, 17–31, 13–24, 21–22
Pts: Jokić 16; Rebs: Jokić 11; Asts: Avramović, Gudurić 3		Pts: Curry 24; Rebs: Adebayo, Embiid 8 Asts: three players 3

Etihad Arena
Abu Dhabi, UAE

Stephen Curry led the United States with 24 points in a 105–79 win over Serbia. He scored Team USA's first nine points and had 18 in the first half, making four three-point field goals in 11 minutes. The game was tied at 40 with 4:42 remaining in the second quarter, when Curry made a four-point play on a three-pointer and subsequent free throw. The Americans led 59–45 at the half, pulling away from the Serbs with a 31–5 run over the second and third quarters. Team USA led by 25 entering the fourth, before expanding its lead to 30.

Davis had all six of the United States' blocks, and the team held six-time All-Star Nikola Jokić, the reigning NBA MVP, to 6-of-19 shooting. Edwards added 16 points off the bench. In his U.S. debut, White finished with four rebounds and an assist in nine minutes. Serbia did not play captain Bogdan Bogdanović.

=== South Sudan ===
FOX

July 20, 2024

Boxscore

South Sudan	100–101	United States
Scoring by quarter: 26–24, 32–20, 18–37, 24–20
Pts: Shayok 24; Rebs: Jones 11; Asts: Jones 11		Pts: James 25; Rebs: Davis 11; Asts: James 6

The O2 Arena
London, United Kingdom

LeBron James made a layup with eight seconds remaining in the game to put Team USA ahead, and they held on for a 101–100 win over South Sudan. After going up 8–0 in the first 2 1/2 minutes of the game, the Americans trailed 58–44 at halftime after South Sudan made 61 percent of their shots in the first half and outscored the United States 21–3 on 3-pointers. Team USA rallied back with an 18–0 run in the second half, going up 79–76 late in the third quarter on a 35-foot (11 m) three-pointer from Curry for their first lead since the first quarter. South Sudan missed three attempts in the final seconds to win the game. The team's performance came as a surprise, as they entered the game as 43 1/2-point underdogs according to BetMGM Sportsbook.

James had a game-high 25 points along with six rebounds and seven assists, and Davis finished with 15 points and 10 rebounds. South Sudan's Marial Shayok had 24 points and Carlik Jones had a triple-double with 15 points, 11 rebounds and 11 assists.

=== Germany ===
FOX

July 22, 2024

Boxscore

Germany	88–92	United States
Scoring by quarter: 19–29, 22–19, 30–20, 17–24
Pts: F. Wagner 18; Rebs: Voigtmann 8 Asts: Schröder 10		Pts: James 20; Rebs: Embiid 8 Asts: Embiid 5

The O2 Arena
London, United Kingdom

James scored the final 11 points for the United States in the last 3:57 of the game as they fended off defending World Cup champion Germany 92–88. Team USA led 48–41 at the half, but they were outscored in the third quarter 30–20. Trailing entering the fourth quarter, the United States' defense held the Germans to 19 points and James took over on offense. The Germans shot just 36%, but took 13 more shots than the Americans, with 14 offensive rebounds leading to 16 points. Team USA also committed 14 turnovers to Germany's 7.

James scored a game-high 20 points and added six rebounds and four assists. Embiid continued his improved play with 15 points, eight rebounds and five assists, offsetting his backup, Davis, who got into foul trouble. Curry had 13 points but made just 1-of-7 on 3-pointers. Off the bench, Edwards added 11 points and Davis had 10 points and seven rebounds. White received all the backup playing time at point guard, as Kerr removed Tyrese Haliburton from the rotation. Franz Wagner, one of four active NBA players on Germany's roster, led his team with 18 points. Andreas Obst, the star of Germany's semifinals win over the United States in the 2023 World Cup, had 17 points and five 3s. Dennis Schröder scored 13 points and had 10 assists while shooting 3-of-15.

== Olympic play ==
The United States went undefeated at 6–0, winning by an average of 19 points per game. LeBron James was named the Olympics MVP after averaging 14.2 points along with team highs of 6.8 rebounds and 8.5 assists per game, and he was named to the Olympics All-Star Five along with Stephen Curry. Curry edged James as the team scoring leader by four total points, averaging 14.8 points per game. Leading up to the semifinals, Curry struggled, shooting 10 of 28 (35.7%) and 5 of 20 on 3-pointers (25%) in four games, averaging 7.3 points while scoring in single-digits three times. Over the final two games, he scored 60 points and made 17 of 26 on 3s. Overall, Curry led the team in plus–minus at plus-86, while James was second at plus-84. U.S. head coach Steve Kerr lauded Devin Booker as the team's "unsung MVP". Normally a high scorer in the NBA, he changed to a 3-and-D role on the Olympic team, serving as an on-ball, perimeter defender and a ball mover on offense. He made a team-high 56.5% (13 of 23) of his 3-pointers.

=== Preliminary round ===
The Olympics featured 12 nations divided into three groups of four. Each team played three games, one game each against the other teams in their group. The first- and second-place teams advanced to the knockout stage, along with the top two third-place teams. The United States was placed in Group C alongside Serbia, South Sudan, and Puerto Rico with games in Lille. The Americans finished 3–0, joining Germany and Canada as the only undefeated teams in group play. Team USA earned the No. 1 seed in the quarterfinals with a plus-64 point differential, surpassing Germany's plus-47 for the highest.

Kerr used three different starting lineups in the preliminary round. He was scrutinized for starting Joel Embiid over Anthony Davis, bringing Kevin Durant off the bench, and removing Jayson Tatum from his rotation. A different player led the team in scoring in every game, each coming off the bench. The team shot 54% with ten players averaging seven or more points per game, each attempting an average of at least six shots per game, but none attempting over ten.

Pos	Team	Pld	W	L	PF	PA	PD	Pts	Qualification
**1**	United States	**3**	**3**	**0**	**317**	**253**	**+64**	**6**	**Quarterfinals**
2	Serbia	3	2	1	287	261	+26	**5**	**Quarterfinals**
3	South Sudan	3	1	2	261	278	−17	**4**	
4	Puerto Rico	3	0	3	228	301	−73	**3**	

Source: FIBA
Rules for classification: 1) classification points; 2) head-to-head results; 3) head-to-head game points difference; 4) head-to-head number of game points scored.

All times are local (UTC+2).

==== Serbia ====
28 July 2024
17:15

Boxscore

Serbia	84–**110**	**United States**
Scoring by quarter: 20–**25**, 29–**33**, 16–**26**, 19–**26**
Pts: Jokić 20; Rebs: Bogdanović 6 Asts: Jokić 8		Pts: Durant 23; Rebs: Davis 8 Asts: James 9

Stade Pierre-Mauroy, Lille
Attendance: 27,328
Referees: Yohan Rosso (FRA), Julio Anaya (PAN), Mārtiņš Kozlovskis (LAT)

Durant scored a game-high 23 points on 8-of-9 shooting as the United States won their opener 110–84 over Serbia. After being out for a month with a calf injury, he was cleared to play less than an hour prior to the game. He made his first eight shots, including five 3-pointers. The Serbians went up 10–2 to start the game and were leading 19–14 when Durant entered the contest and made his first two jump shots, both 3-pointers. He scored 21 points in the first half, helping Team USA to a 58–49 halftime lead.

James had 21 points, seven rebounds and nine assists for the Americans. Embiid struggled with four points on 2-of-5 shooting and two rebounds in 11 minutes, finishing with a plus–minus of minus-eight, the only American with a negative plus–minus, while the United States was a plus-34 when he was off the floor. Kerr replaced him early with Davis, who had seven points, eight rebounds, and a team-high plus-28. Embiid and Davis both missed practice time leading up to the game due to illness. With Durant's return, Kerr chose not to play Tatum. Three-time NBA MVP Nikola Jokić had a team-high 20 points for Serbia along with five rebounds and eight assists. The teams both scored 81 points in the 30:45 minutes that he played, but Serbia was outscored 29–3 during his 9:15 on the bench.

==== South Sudan ====
31 July 2024
21:00

Boxscore

**United States**	**103**–86	South Sudan
Scoring by quarter: **26**–14, **29**–22, 18–**21**, **30**–29
Pts: Adebayo 18; Rebs: three players 7 Asts: Booker 6		Pts: Omot 24; Rebs: Gabriel 10; Asts: Jones 7

Stade Pierre-Mauroy, Lille
Attendance: 27,056
Referees: Antonio Conde (ESP), Mārtiņš Kozlovskis (LAT), Takaki Kato (JPN)

Bam Adebayo came off the bench and scored a team-high 18 points in a 103–86 win over South Sudan that clinched a spot in the quarterfinals. After nearly beating the United States in their exhibition game, the South Sudanese led 7–6 and 10–8 before the Americans outscored them 25–4 for a 33–14 lead and 55–36 edge at halftime. After South Sudan pulled to within 10 in the third quarter, Team USA entered the final period up 73–57. The U.S. reserves outscored South Sudan's 66–14.

After sitting out the previous game against Serbia, Tatum entered the starting lineup, replacing his Boston teammate Jrue Holiday. Adebayo, who shot 8 for 10 and added seven rebounds, received extended playing time as Embiid did not play. Davis, who replaced Embiid in the starting lineup, had eight points, seven rebounds and two blocks. Kerr called South Sudan—who made 14 three-pointers in their game in London against Team USA—"the fastest team" they would face in the Olympics, and he wanted a "smaller, quicker team" to match up, which kept Embiid on the bench. With the United States using an 11-man rotation in the first half, Tyrese Haliburton made his first appearance in the Olympics. Durant came off the bench again and scored 14 points, one of six Americans in double figures. Nuni Omot led South Sudan with a game-high 24 points, while Carlik Jones added 18 points on 8-of-19 shooting.

==== Puerto Rico ====
3 August 2024
17:15

Boxscore

Puerto Rico	83–**104**	**United States**
Scoring by quarter: **29**–25, 16–**39**, 14–**23**, **24**–17
Pts: Alvarado 18; Rebs: Romero 10; Asts: Conditt IV 5		Pts: Edwards 26; Rebs: Tatum 10; Asts: James 8

Stade Pierre-Mauroy, Lille
Attendance: 27,244
Referees: Julio Anaya (PAN), Gatis Saliņš (LAT), Martin Vulić (CRO)

Anthony Edwards scored a game-high 26 points on 11-of-15 shooting for Team USA, who won 104–83 over Puerto Rico to clinch the No. 1 seed in the knockout round. The Puerto Ricans were up by eight late in the first quarter. They were leading 37–36 with 5:45 remaining in the first half, when the Americans outscored them 28–8, during which James had all six of his first-half assists, to end the half ahead 64–45. After surrendering 29 points in the first quarter, the United States held Puerto Rico to 30 points combined in the second and third quarters.

James ended with 10 points, eight assists and six rebounds; he and Curry each had a game-high plus-18 in 18 minutes of play. Embiid returned to the starting lineup and had 15 points and two blocks. Durant had 11 points off the bench, and Tatum had 10 points and 10 rebounds in his second consecutive start, as the United States had six players score in double figures. Holiday sat out the game after spraining his ankle in the previous game against South Sudan. According to Kerr, "He would've played had this been a medal-round game". Jose Alvarado, Puerto Rico's only active NBA player, had a team-high 18 points. Despite being at a size disadvantage, they outrebounded Team USA 51–48 and grabbed 18 offensive rebounds. However, the Americans forced 16 turnovers and had 22 fast break points compared to 12 for the Puerto Ricans.

=== Knockout round ===
Quarterfinals
6 August
**France**	**82**
Canada	73
6 August
**Germany**	**76**
Greece	63
6 August
Brazil	87
**United States**	**122**
6 August
**Serbia (OT)**	**95**
Australia	90

Semifinals
8 August
**France**	**73**
Germany	69
8 August
**United States**	**95**
Serbia	91

Gold medal
10 August
France	87
**United States**	**98**
Bronze medal
10 August
Germany	83
**Serbia**	**93**

Entering the knockout round as the No. 1 seed, the United States was placed in the opposite bracket from the other group winners, Germany and Canada, as well as France. Team USA opened against Brazil, who was 1–2 in Group B. For the second straight Olympics, the Americans defeated the French in the gold–medal game, having won over France 87–82 in the 2020 Olympics. The United States improved their record to 4–0 in gold medal games versus France.

==== Quarterfinal – Brazil ====
6 August 2024
21:30

Boxscore

Brazil	87–**122**	**United States**
Scoring by quarter: 21–**33**, 15–**30**, **35**–31, 16–**28**
Pts: Caboclo 30; Rebs: Georginho 8 Asts: Meindl 7		Pts: Booker 18; Rebs: Davis 8 Asts: James 9

Accor Arena, Paris
Attendance: 12,364
Referees: Antonio Conde (ESP), Luis Castillo (ESP), Yevgeniy Mikheyev (KAZ)

Devin Booker led the Americans with a team-high 18 points in a decisive 122–87 win over Brazil. The United States jumped out to a 10-point lead after four minutes and were ahead by 12 after one quarter. After a quick run by Brazil brought them to within eight in the middle of the second quarter, Team USA went on a 21–2 run for a 63–36 halftime lead. In 12 first-half minutes, Embiid had 14 points and seven rebounds, shooting 5 of 6 and making two 3-pointers. For the game, the United States shot 57.7% and made 15 three-pointers, as every player scored.

Embiid sat out the second half as a precaution after rolling his ankle. James had 12 points and nine assists before exiting the game in the third quarter after being elbowed above his left eye by Brazil's Georginho while going for a rebound; James needed four stitches. Durant had 11 points and became Team USA's all-time leading Olympic scorer, either men's or women's, passing Lisa Leslie's mark of 488. Tatum was the 11th American to enter the game when Booker got into foul trouble in the second quarter. For the second time in U.S. Olympic history, Team USA scored 100 or more points in each of their first four games, joining the 1992 team. Brazil's Bruno Caboclo scored a game-high 30 points.

==== Semifinal – Serbia ====
8 August 2024
21:00

Boxscore

**United States**	**95**–91	Serbia
Scoring by quarter: 23–**31**, 20–**23**, 20–**22**, **32**–15
Pts: Curry 36; Rebs: James 12; Asts: James 10		Pts: Bogdanović 20; Rebs: three players 5 Asts: Jokić 11

Accor Arena, Paris
Attendance: 12,213
Referees: Ademir Zurapović (BIH), Julio Anaya (PAN), Mārtiņš Kozlovskis (LAT)

Curry scored 36 points while shooting 9 of 14 on 3-pointers as the United States overcame a 17-point deficit to win 95–91 over Serbia. Team USA trailed for over 35 of the game's 40 minutes. Curry scored 14 of their first 15 points and made five 3-pointers in the first quarter, but the Serbs still led 31–23 at the end of the quarter after shooting 11 of 17 and making 5 of 9 on 3s. Serbia was ahead by 17 in the second quarter and led by 11 at halftime after making ten 3-pointers in the first half. They were leading by 13 entering the fourth quarter and were up 11 with 7:19 remaining when the Americans took control, outscoring the Serbs 32–15 in the fourth quarter. After shooting 15 of 30 on 3-pointers through three quarters, Serbia shot 0 of 9 from deep in the last 10 minutes. They had made five 3-pointers and scored at least 22 points in each of the first three quarters. Curry made the go-ahead 3-pointer with 2:24 left in the game, and scored seven of his team's final 11 points. James played the entire final period, recording 6 points, 6 rebounds and 4 assists, to finish with 16 points, 12 rebounds and 10 assists for an unprecedented second career triple-double in the Olympics.

Curry exceeded his combined scoring total over the first four U.S. games, in which he had 29 points on 10-of-28 shooting. Embiid scored 19 points on 8-of-11 shooting and added four rebounds in 27 minutes; he scored seven straight points in the fourth quarter. Durant was scoreless until late in the third quarter, before scoring seven of his nine points in the fourth. As in their group play game against Serbia, Tatum did not play for Team USA; Haliburton was also held out. Bogdan Bogdanović had 20 points for Serbia, and Jokić scored 17 points and added 11 assists in 38 minutes. Aleksa Avramović, Ognjen Dobrić, and Marko Gudurić were a combined 9 of 14 on their 3-pointers.

==== Final – France ====
10 August 2024
21:30

Boxscore

France	87–**98**	**United States**
Scoring by quarter: 15–**20**, 26–**29**, **25**–23, 21–**26**
Pts: Wembanyama 26; Rebs: Batum 8 Asts: Batum 4		Pts: Curry 24; Rebs: Davis 9 Asts: James 10

Accor Arena, Paris
Attendance: 12,121
Referees: Antonio Conde (ESP), Julio Anaya (PAN), Wojciech Liszka (POL)

Curry scored all 24 of his points on 3-pointers in a 98–87 win over France for the Americans' fifth consecutive Olympic gold medal. Team USA took a 29–27 lead in the middle of the second quarter and never trailed again. They expanded their lead to double digits before halftime before ending the half up 49–41. Ahead by 14 early in the third quarter, the Americans' offense sputtered, and France went on a 12–4 run and pulled to 72–66 entering the final quarter. They got to within three points with 3:02 remaining, but Curry made four 3-pointers in the final 2:47 to secure the victory. His final one came after a 3-pointer by Victor Wembanyama brought France to within 93–87 with 54.4 seconds to go. Curry forced an off-balance shot over Nicolas Batum and Evan Fournier to put the United States up 96–87 with 35 seconds remaining. "I was kind of like, 'What the (expletive)'", said Adebayo. "Then I remembered who was shooting it." Curry put his hands to the side of his head, a celebratory move that he calls "Night, Night", signalling to the other team that the win is now out of reach and it is time for them to go to sleep.

James finished with 14 points, six rebounds and 10 assists. In his first start of the tournament, Durant scored 15 and became the first four-time gold medalist in Olympic men's basketball history. Booker also had 15 points. The Americans shot 18 of 36 on 3-pointers compared to the French's 9-of-30. Wembanyama scored a game-high 26 points and added seven rebounds, as he teamed with Guerschon Yabusele (20 points) to account for over half of their team's scoring. In his first Olympics, the NBA Rookie of the Year Wembanyama scored the second-most points ever against the United States in a gold-medal game, one less than Dražen Dalipagić's 27 for Yugoslavia against the 1976 team. French coach Vincent Collet regretted his team's 10-for-17 free-throw shooting and bungled scoring opportunities. "I was expecting more, but you have to do the perfect game. We had a chance. We didn't take it," said Collet.

=== Statistics ===
Legend
GP	Games played	GS	Games started	MPG	Minutes per game
FGM	Field goals made	FGA	Field goals attempted	FG%	Field goal percentage
3PM	3-point field goals made	3PA	3-point field goals attempted	3P%	3-point field goal percentage
FTM	Free throws made	FTA	Free throws attempted	FT%	Free throw percentage
RPG	Rebounds per game	APG	Assists per game	PPG	Points per game

Player	GP	GS	MPG	FGM	FGA	FG%	3PM	3PA	3P%	FTM	FTA	FT%	RPG	APG	PPG
LeBron James	6	6	**24.5**	**35**	53	**.660**	4	13	.308	11	15	.733	**6.8**	**8.5**	14.2
Stephen Curry	6	6	23.3	30	**60**	.500	**22**	**46**	.478	7	7	**1.000**	3.2	2.5	**14.8**
Kevin Durant	6	1	22.2	27	50	.540	14	27	.519	**15**	**16**	.938	3.2	2.3	13.8
Devin Booker	6	6	22.0	25	44	.571	13	23	**.565**	7	9	.778	2.7	3.3	11.7
Anthony Davis	6	1	16.6	20	32	.625	1	2	.500	9	11	.818	6.7	2.0	8.3
Anthony Edwards	6	0	16.3	29	50	.580	12	25	.480	7	12	.583	2.8	1.2	12.8
Bam Adebayo	6	0	16.1	16	30	.533	3	9	.333	1	2	.500	3.7	1.3	6.0
Jrue Holiday	5	3	18.8	15	27	.556	8	16	.500	0	0	.000	1.8	3.6	7.6
Joel Embiid	5	5	16.8	21	37	.568	6	11	.545	8	11	.727	3.8	1.4	11.2
Derrick White	5	0	15.8	7	17	.412	4	13	.308	1	2	.500	1.4	1.6	3.8
Jayson Tatum	4	2	17.7	8	21	.381	0	4	.000	5	6	.833	5.3	1.5	5.3
Tyrese Haliburton	3	0	8.8	3	5	.600	2	4	.500	0	0	.000	0.0	0.7	2.7
Team totals	6	–	200.0	236	426	.554	89	193	.461	71	91	.780	39.8	28.0	105.3

- **Bold** denotes team high

== See also ==
- Court of Gold, documentary on 2024 men's Olympic basketball teams, including the United States
