= 2024 Serbia men's Olympic basketball team =

- Flag of Serbia
- Head coach: Svetislav Pešić
- Arena: Stade Pierre-Mauroy, Lille; Accor Arena, Paris
- 2024 Summer Olympics: 3rd place, bronze medalist(s)
- PIR leader: Nikola Jokić 31.0
- Scoring leader: Nikola Jokić 18.8
- Rebounding leader: Nikola Jokić 10.7
- Assists leader: Nikola Jokić 8.7
- Biggest win: 107–66 Puerto Rico (31 July 2024)
- Biggest defeat: 84–110 United States (28 July 2024)
Home	Away
- All statistics correct as of 10 August 2024.

The men's national basketball team of Serbia competed at the 2024 Summer Olympics in Paris, France, where they earned a bronze medal. They qualified for the Olympics as one of the top two FIBA Basketball World Cup finishers from Europe in 2023. Serbia last competed in the 2016 Summer Olympics, securing a silver medal.

== Timeline ==
- June 11 16-man roster announcement
- June 24 Start of training camp
- July 5–22 Exhibition games
- July 23 Final 12-man roster announcement
- July 28 – August 11 2024 Summer Olympics

== Roster ==
A 16-player roster was announced on 11 June 2024. Several active EuroLeague or NBA players who have previously won medals with the Serbia national team, including Miloš Teodosić, Nikola Kalinić, Stefan Jović, Boban Marjanović, and Nemanja Nedović, were not included in the call-up or declined the invitation for various reasons.

The roster also did not feature young talents who were drafted into the NBA this year, such as Nikola Topić and Nikola Đurišić, nor did it include Washington Wizards rookie Tristan Vukčević.

Boriša Simanić, who was part of the team at the 2023 FIBA Basketball World Cup that secured participation in the 2024 Summer Olympics in Paris, has not fully recovered and was also not part of the broader list. On 30 August 2023, while playing against South Sudan, Simanić was struck in the kidney by Nuni Omot while defending the basket. This blow resulted in a major injury which required his kidney to be removed.

Due to unavailability, Vladimir Lučić was replaced by Aleksa Radanov on 24 June 2024.

The final squad was announced on 23 July 2024. The roster, which includes nine players who participated in last year's World Cup, features the return of stars Nikola Jokić and Vasilije Micić, while newcomer Uroš Plavšić made his debut representing Serbia.

Serbia men's national basketball team – 2024 Summer Olympics roster
Players
Coaches

Pos.	No.	Name	Age – Date of birth	Height	Club	Ctr.
C	0	Uroš Plavšić	25 – 22 December 1998	2.16 m (7 ft 1 in)	Crvena zvezda	(Serbia)
F/C	3	Filip Petrušev	24 – 15 April 2000	2.11 m (6 ft 11 in)	Olympiacos	(Greece)
PF	5	Nikola Jović	21 – 9 June 2003	2.08 m (6 ft 10 in)	Miami Heat	(United States)
SG	7	Bogdan Bogdanović (C)	31 – 18 August 1992	1.96 m (6 ft 5 in)	Atlanta Hawks	(United States)
SG	9	Vanja Marinković	27 – 9 January 1997	1.98 m (6 ft 6 in)	Partizan	(Serbia)
SF	13	Ognjen Dobrić	29 – 27 October 1994	2.00 m (6 ft 7 in)	Crvena zvezda	(Serbia)
C	15	Nikola Jokić	29 – 19 February 1995	2.11 m (6 ft 11 in)	Denver Nuggets	(United States)
PG	22	Vasilije Micić	30 – 13 January 1994	1.95 m (6 ft 5 in)	Charlotte Hornets	(United States)
G/F	23	Marko Gudurić	29 – 8 March 1995	1.96 m (6 ft 5 in)	Fenerbahçe	(Turkey)
F	27	Dejan Davidovac	29 – 17 January 1995	2.03 m (6 ft 8 in)	Crvena zvezda	(Serbia)
PG	30	Aleksa Avramović	29 – 25 October 1994	1.92 m (6 ft 4 in)	Partizan	(Serbia)
C	33	Nikola Milutinov	29 – 30 December 1994	2.13 m (7 ft 0 in)	Olympiacos	(Greece)

Head coach

- (Serbia) Svetislav Pešić

Assistant coach(es)

- (Serbia) Oliver Kostić
- (Serbia) Saša Kosović
- (Serbia) Marko Marinović
- (Serbia) Ognjen Stojaković
- (Serbia) Nenad Jakovljević

Legend

- (C) Team captain
- Club – describes last
  club before the tournament
- Age – describes age
  on 27 July 2024

Roster

The following were candidates to make the team:

Earlier candidates
Player	Team (Note: Team at the time player was a candidate)	Added	Removed	Reason
Vladimir Lučić	(Germany) Bayern Munich	June 11, 2024	June 24, 2024	Withdrew
Ognjen Jaramaz	(Serbia) Partizan	June 11, 2024	July 23, 2024	12-man roster cut
Dušan Ristić	(Spain) Canarias	June 11, 2024	July 23, 2024	12-man roster cut
Aleksej Pokuševski	Unattached	June 11, 2024	July 23, 2024	12-man roster cut
Aleksa Radanov	(Russia) Runa Basket Moscow	June 24, 2024	July 23, 2024	12-man roster cut

== Staff ==
Position	Staff member
Head coach	(Serbia) Svetislav Pešić
Assistant coaches	(Serbia) Oliver Kostić
Assistant coaches	(Serbia) Saša Kosović
Assistant coaches	(Serbia) Marko Marinović
Assistant coaches	(Serbia) Ognjen Stojaković
Assistant coaches	(Serbia) Nenad Jakovljević
Managing Director	(Serbia) Dragan Tarlać
Team manager	(Serbia) Nebojša Ilić
Traineres	(Serbia) Marko Sekulić
Traineres	(Serbia) Marko Stanojević
Scout	(Serbia) Mihajlo Mitić
Physicians	(Serbia) Dragan Radovanović
Physicians	(Serbia) Milan Mirković
Physiotherapists	(Serbia) Dušan Sajić
Physiotherapists	(Serbia) Dušan Popović
Physiotherapists	(United States) Robert Miller Jason
Equipment manager	(Serbia) Jovica Aničić
Press officer	(Serbia) Ivan Ivković

Source: KSS

== Exhibition games ==
Unofficial games

July 5, 2024
19:30 (UTC+2)

Report

Serbia	90–74	Netherlands
Scoring by quarter: 19–17, 30–22, 24–12, 17–23
Pts: Plavšić 19; Rebs: Jokić 9 Asts: Jokić 10		Pts: Van der Vuurst de Vries 18; Rebs: three players 3 Asts: Van der Vuurst de Vries 9

Belgrade Arena
Belgrade, Serbia
Attendance: 0

July 6, 2024
16:00 (UTC+2)

Report

Serbia	95–61	Netherlands
Scoring by quarter: 17–21, 31–16, 30–13, 17–11
Pts: Marinković 21; Rebs: Pokuševski 5 Asts: Jokić, Gudurić 5		Pts: Van der Vuurst de Vries, Aristode 13; Rebs: N'Guessan 5 Asts: Van der Vuurst de Vries, Saizonou 6

Belgrade Arena
Belgrade, Serbia
Attendance: 0

Lyon game

July 12, 2024
21:00 (UTC+2)

Report

France	67–79	Serbia
Scoring by quarter: 23–18, 9–27, 20–15, 15–19
Pts: Wembanyama 14; Rebs: Wembanyama 10; Asts: three players 3		Pts: Jokić 20; Rebs: Jokić 12; Asts: Avramović, Micić 3

LDLC Arena
Lyon, France
Attendance: 9,500

Abu Dhabi friendlies

July 16, 2024
20:00 (UTC+4)

Report

Australia	84–73	Serbia
Scoring by quarter: 20–15, 19–25, 23–19, 22–14
Pts: Mills 28; Rebs: Exum 7 Asts: Mills 5		Pts: Petrušev 17; Rebs: Jokić 14; Asts: Micić 8

Etihad Arena
Abu Dhabi, UAE
Attendance: not available

July 17, 2024
20:00 (UTC+4)

Report

United States	105–79	Serbia
Scoring by quarter: 28–28, 31–17, 24–14, 22–21
Pts: Curry 24; Rebs: Adebayo, Embiid 8 Asts: three players 3		Pts: Jokić 16; Rebs: Jokić 11; Asts: Avramović, Gudurić 3

Etihad Arena
Abu Dhabi, UAE
Attendance: 12,517

Belgrade games

July 21, 2024
20:00 (UTC+2)

Report

Serbia	119–100	Japan
Scoring by quarter: 33–23, 26–29, 32–18, 28–30
Pts: Jokić 18; Rebs: Jokić 8 Asts: Bogdanović 8		Pts: Hachimura 29; Rebs: Hawkinson 5 Asts: Kawamura 8

Belgrade Arena
Belgrade, Serbia
Attendance: 15,026

July 22, 2024
20:00 (UTC+2)

Report

Serbia	94–72	Greece
Scoring by quarter: 26–21, 22–18, 24–19, 22–14
Pts: Bogdanović 19; Rebs: Jokić, Petrušev 8 Asts: Avramović 8		Pts: Antetokounmpo 17; Rebs: Antetokounmpo 6 Asts: three players 4

Belgrade Arena
Belgrade, Serbia
Attendance: 18,000

== Olympic play ==
=== Preliminary round ===
Serbia was placed in Group C.

Pos	Team	Pld	W	L	PF	PA	PD	Pts	Qualification
1	United States	3	3	0	317	253	+64	6	Quarterfinals
2	Serbia	3	2	1	287	261	+26	5	Quarterfinals
3	South Sudan	3	1	2	261	278	−17	4	
4	Puerto Rico	3	0	3	228	301	−73	3	

Source: FIBA
Rules for classification: 1) classification points; 2) head-to-head results; 3) head-to-head game points difference; 4) head-to-head number of game points scored.

All times are local (UTC+2).

==== United States ====
28 July 2024
17:15

Boxscore

Serbia	84–110	United States
Scoring by quarter: 20–25, 29–33, 16–26, 19–26
Pts: Jokić 20; Rebs: Bogdanović 6 Asts: Jokić 8		Pts: Durant 23; Rebs: Davis 8 Asts: James 9

Stade Pierre-Mauroy, Lille
Attendance: 27,328
Referees: Yohan Rosso (FRA), Julio Anaya (PAN), Mārtiņš Kozlovskis (LAT)

==== Puerto Rico ====
31 July 2024
17:15

Boxscore

Puerto Rico	66–107	Serbia
Scoring by quarter: 12–24, 23–28, 16–27, 15–28
Pts: Ortiz 19; Rebs: Ortiz 6 Asts: Howard, Waters 3		Pts: Petrušev 15; Rebs: Jokić 15; Asts: Jokić 9

Stade Pierre-Mauroy, Lille
Attendance: 17,882
Referees: Julio Anaya (PAN), Juan Fernández (ARG), Boris Krejić (SLO)

==== South Sudan ====
3 August 2024
21:00

Boxscore

Serbia	96–85	South Sudan
Scoring by quarter: 23–22, 24–22, 25–23, 24–18
Pts: Bogdanović 30; Rebs: Jokić 13; Asts: Bogdanović 8		Pts: Jones, Shayok 17; Rebs: Gabriel 8 Asts: Jones 10

Stade Pierre-Mauroy, Lille
Attendance: 20,916
Referees: Ademir Zurapović (BIH), Yohan Rosso (FRA), Juan Fernández (ARG)

=== Knockout round ===
Quarterfinals
6 August
France	82
Canada	73
6 August
Germany	76
Greece	63
6 August
Brazil	87
United States	122
6 August
Serbia (OT)	95
Australia	90

Semifinals
8 August
France	73
Germany	69
8 August
United States	95
Serbia	91

Gold medal
10 August
France	87
United States	98
Bronze medal
10 August
Germany	83
Serbia	93

==== Quarterfinal – Australia ====
6 August 2024
14:30

Boxscore

Serbia	95–90 (OT)	Australia
Scoring by quarter: 17–31, 25–23, 25–11, 15–17, Overtime: 13–8
Pts: Jokić 21; Rebs: Jokić 14; Asts: Jokić 9		Pts: Mills 26; Rebs: Landale, Magnay 6 Asts: Exum 5

Accor Arena, Paris
Attendance: 12,317
Referees: Yohan Rosso (FRA), Julio Anaya (PAN), Wojciech Liszka (POL)

==== Semifinal – United States ====
8 August 2024
21:00

Boxscore

United States	95–91	Serbia
Scoring by quarter: 23–31, 20–23, 20–22, 32–15
Pts: Curry 36; Rebs: James 12; Asts: James 10		Pts: Bogdanović 20; Rebs: three players 5 Asts: Jokić 11

Accor Arena, Paris
Attendance: 12,213
Referees: Ademir Zurapović (BIH), Julio Anaya (PAN), Mārtiņš Kozlovskis (LAT)

==== Bronze medal game – Germany ====
10 August 2024
11:00

Boxscore

Germany	83–93	Serbia
Scoring by quarter: 21–30, 17–16, 25–26, 20–21
Pts: F. Wagner 18; Rebs: F. Wagner 9 Asts: Schröder, Weiler-Babb 6		Pts: Jokić, Micić 19; Rebs: Jokić 12; Asts: Jokić 11

Accor Arena, Paris
Attendance: 12,406
Referees: Matthew Kallio (CAN), Yohan Rosso (FRA), Johnny Batista (PUR)

== See also ==
- Serbia at the 2024 Summer Olympics
