= Basketball at the 2024 Summer Olympics – Men's tournament =

Tournament details
- Host country: France
- Dates: 27 July – 10 August 2024
- Teams: 12 (from 5 confederations)
- Venue(s): Stade Pierre-Mauroy; Accor Arena (in 2 host cities)

Final positions
- Champions: United States (17th title)
- Runners-up: France
- Third place: Serbia
- Fourth place: Germany

Tournament statistics
- Games played: 26
- Attendance: 564,474 (21,711 per game)
- MVP: (United States) LeBron James
- Top scorer: (Greece) Giannis Antetokounmpo (25.8 ppg)

The men's 5x5 basketball tournament at the 2024 Summer Olympics was the 21st edition of the event for men at the Summer Olympic Games. It was held from 27 July to 10 August 2024. Preliminary games occurred at Stade Pierre-Mauroy in Villeneuve d'Ascq, with the final phase staged at the Accor Arena (referred to as the Bercy Arena due to IOC rules disallowing Olympic host venues to be named after non-IOC sponsors) in Paris.The United States went unbeaten to win a seventeenth overall and fifth consecutive gold medal, after defeating France 98–87 in a rematch of the previous final. Serbia won the bronze with a 93–83 victory over World Champions Germany, winning its third Olympic medal and first bronze (after two silvers) in men's basketball since the breakup of Yugoslavia.

== Format ==
The twelve teams were split into three groups of four teams, and a single round-robin was held within each group. The first- and second-placed teams of each group advanced to the quarterfinals, as well as the two best third-placed teams. After the preliminary round, the teams were grouped according to their results, and a draw paired teams between the groups for the quarterfinals. For the draw, the teams were seeded in four pots, with the top two-ranked teams (Pot D), 3rd–4th ranked teams (Pot E), 5–6th ranked teams (Pot F) and 7–8th ranked teams (Pot G). Teams from Pot D faced a team from Pot G and teams from Pot E a team from Pot F. Teams from the same group could not face each other again. If both teams from Pot D qualified for the semifinals, they could not play against each other.

== Schedule ==
The schedule of the tournament was as follows.

Legend
G	Group stage	¼	Quarter-finals	½	Semi-finals	B	Bronze medal match	F	Gold medal match

Sat 27	Sun 28	Mon 29	Tue 30	Wed 31	Thu 1	Fri 2	Sat 3	Sun 4	Mon 5	Tue 6	Wed 7	Thu 8	Fri 9	Sat 10	
G	G		G	G		G	G			¼		½		B	F

== Qualified teams ==
Qualification method		Date	Venue	Berths	Qualified team
Host nation		—N/a	—N/a	1	France
2023 FIBA Basketball World Cup	Africa	25 August – 10 September 2023	Philippines; Indonesia; Japan	1	South Sudan
2023 FIBA Basketball World Cup	Americas	25 August – 10 September 2023	Philippines; Indonesia; Japan	2	Canada
2023 FIBA Basketball World Cup	Americas	25 August – 10 September 2023	Philippines; Indonesia; Japan	2	United States
2023 FIBA Basketball World Cup	Asia	25 August – 10 September 2023	Philippines; Indonesia; Japan	1	Japan
2023 FIBA Basketball World Cup	Europe	25 August – 10 September 2023	Philippines; Indonesia; Japan	2	Germany
2023 FIBA Basketball World Cup	Europe	25 August – 10 September 2023	Philippines; Indonesia; Japan	2	Serbia
2023 FIBA Basketball World Cup	Oceania	25 August – 10 September 2023	Philippines; Indonesia; Japan	1	Australia
2024 FIBA Men's Olympic Qualifying Tournaments		2–7 July 2024	(Spain) Valencia	1	Spain
2024 FIBA Men's Olympic Qualifying Tournaments		2–7 July 2024	(Latvia) Riga	1	Brazil
2024 FIBA Men's Olympic Qualifying Tournaments		2–7 July 2024	(Greece) Piraeus	1	Greece
2024 FIBA Men's Olympic Qualifying Tournaments		2–7 July 2024	(Puerto Rico) San Juan	1	Puerto Rico
Total				12	

== Squads ==
Each roster consisted of 12 players.

== Draw ==
The draw was held on 19 March 2024.

The 12 teams were divided into four pots of three teams based on their FIBA World Ranking. The three groups were formed by drawing one team from each pot. Two teams from the same continent could not be placed into the same group, with the exception of European teams, where each group had to contain a minimum of two and a maximum of three European teams.

For broadcast purposes, defending champions the United States were allocated to Group C, while hosts France could only be drawn into Group A or B.

=== Seeding ===
The seeding was announced on 15 March 2024. As the four winners of the 2024 FIBA Men's Olympic Qualifying Tournaments (OQTs) were yet to be decided at the time of the draw, they were assigned placeholders. Each of the four placeholders were seeded based on the highest-ranked team in each tournament.

Pot 1	Pot 2	Pot 3	Pot 4
United States; Spain (ESP) (Note: The four winners of the 2024 FIBA Men's Olympic Qualifying Tournaments (OQTs) were assigned as placeholders at the time of the draw.); Germany	Serbia; Australia; Brazil (LAT)	Canada; France; Puerto Rico (PUR)	Greece (GRE); Japan; South Sudan

== Referees ==
The following 30 referees were selected for the tournament.

- (Argentina) Juan Fernández
- (Australia) James Boyer
- (Bosnia and Herzegovina) Ademir Zurapović
- (Canada) Matthew Kallio
- (Canada) Maripier Malo
- (Croatia) Martin Vulić
- (Denmark) Maj Forsberg
- (Ecuador) Carlos Peralta
- (France) Yohan Rosso
- (Hungary) Péter Praksch
- (Japan) Takaki Kato
- (Kazakhstan) Yevgeniy Mikheyev
- (Latvia) Mārtiņš Kozlovskis
- (Latvia) Gatis Saliņš
- (Lebanon) Rabah Noujaim
- (Madagascar) Yann Davidson
- (Mexico) Omar Bermúdez
- (Norway) Viola Györgyi
- (Panama) Julio Anaya
- (Poland) Wojciech Liszka
- (Puerto Rico) Johnny Batista
- (Puerto Rico) Roberto Vázquez
- (Slovenia) Boris Krejić
- (Spain) Luis Castillo
- (Spain) Ariadna Chueca
- (Spain) Antonio Conde
- (Uruguay) Andrés Bartel
- (United States) Amy Bonner
- (United States) Blanca Burns
- (United States) Jenna Reneau

== Preliminary round ==
All times are local (UTC+2).

=== Group A ===
Pos	Team	Pld	W	L	PF	PA	PD	Pts	Qualification
1	Canada	3	3	0	267	247	+20	6	Quarterfinals
2	Australia	3	1	2	246	250	−4	4 (Note: Australia 3 Pts, +6 PD; Greece 3 Pts, −1 PD; Spain 3 Pts, −5 PD.)	Quarterfinals
3	Greece	3	1	2	233	241	−8	4	Quarterfinals
4	Spain	3	1	2	249	257	−8	4	

Source: FIBA
Rules for classification: 1) classification points; 2) head-to-head results; 3) head-to-head game points difference; 4) head-to-head number of game points scored.
Notes:

27 July 2024
11:00

Boxscore

Australia	92–80	Spain
Scoring by quarter: 31–21, 18–21, 20–18, 23–20
Pts: Landale 20; Rebs: Landale 9 Asts: Giddey 8		Pts: Aldama 27; Rebs: Garuba 7 Asts: Brown 7

Stade Pierre-Mauroy, Lille
Attendance: 26,991
Referees: Gatis Saliņš (LAT), Omar Bermúdez (MEX), Juan Fernández (ARG)

27 July 2024
21:00

Boxscore

Greece	79–86	Canada
Scoring by quarter: 22–26, 16–22, 22–20, 19–18
Pts: Antetokounmpo 34; Rebs: Mitoglou 8 Asts: Calathes 7		Pts: Barrett 23; Rebs: Olynyk 6 Asts: Gilgeous-Alexander 7

Stade Pierre-Mauroy, Lille
Attendance: 26,421
Referees: Roberto Vázquez (PUR), Johnny Batista (PUR), Wojciech Liszka (POL)

30 July 2024
11:00

Boxscore

Spain	84–77	Greece
Scoring by quarter: 21–22, 28–13, 13–21, 22–21
Pts: Aldama 19; Rebs: Aldama 12; Asts: Brown 10		Pts: Antetokounmpo 27; Rebs: Antetokounmpo 11; Asts: Calathes 7

Stade Pierre-Mauroy, Lille
Attendance: 26,980
Referees: Ademir Zurapović (BIH), Mārtiņš Kozlovskis (LAT), Julio Anaya (PAN)

30 July 2024
13:30

Boxscore

Canada	93–83	Australia
Scoring by quarter: 26–28, 19–21, 27–21, 21–13
Pts: Barrett 24; Rebs: Powell 9 Asts: Barrett, Murray 5		Pts: Giddey 19; Rebs: Landale 12; Asts: Giddey 6

Stade Pierre-Mauroy, Lille
Attendance: 26,980
Referees: Yohan Rosso (FRA), Johnny Batista (PUR), Takaki Kato (JPN)

2 August 2024
13:30

Boxscore

Australia	71–77	Greece
Scoring by quarter: 24–25, 12–28, 14–9, 21–15
Pts: Landale 17; Rebs: Giddey 11; Asts: Daniels 8		Pts: Antetokounmpo 20; Rebs: three players 7 Asts: Calathes 8

Stade Pierre-Mauroy, Lille
Attendance: 26,850
Referees: Roberto Vázquez (PUR), Mārtiņš Kozlovskis (LAT), Johnny Batista (PUR)

2 August 2024
17:15

Boxscore

Canada	88–85	Spain
Scoring by quarter: 19–19, 30–19, 15–18, 24–29
Pts: Gilgeous-Alexander 20; Rebs: Brooks, Murray 4 Asts: Murray 6		Pts: Brizuela 17; Rebs: Aldama 11; Asts: three players 4

Stade Pierre-Mauroy, Lille
Attendance: 26,133
Referees: Ademir Zurapović (BIH), Julio Anaya (PAN), Gatis Saliņš (LAT)

=== Group B ===
Pos	Team	Pld	W	L	PF	PA	PD	Pts	Qualification
1	Germany	3	3	0	268	221	+47	6	Quarterfinals
2	France (H)	3	2	1	243	241	+2	5	Quarterfinals
3	Brazil	3	1	2	241	248	−7	4	Quarterfinals
4	Japan	3	0	3	251	293	−42	3	

Source: FIBA
Rules for classification: 1) classification points; 2) head-to-head results; 3) head-to-head game points difference; 4) head-to-head number of game points scored.
(H) Hosts

27 July 2024
13:30

Boxscore

Germany	97–77	Japan
Scoring by quarter: 28–21, 24–23, 22–17, 23–16
Pts: F. Wagner 22; Rebs: Theis 7 Asts: Schröder 12		Pts: Hachimura 20; Rebs: Hawkinson 11; Asts: Kawamura 7

Stade Pierre-Mauroy, Lille
Attendance: 26,991
Referees: Antonio Conde (ESP), Boris Krejić (SLO), Amy Bonner (USA)

27 July 2024
17:15

Boxscore

France	78–66	Brazil
Scoring by quarter: 15–23, 24–13, 18–9, 21–21
Pts: Batum, Wembanyama 19; Rebs: Wembanyama 9 Asts: Albicy 4		Pts: Felício, Meindl 14; Rebs: Felício 6 Asts: Dos Santos 6

Stade Pierre-Mauroy, Lille
Attendance: 26,766
Referees: Matthew Kallio (CAN), Luis Castillo (ESP), Carlos Peralta (ECU)

30 July 2024
17:15

Boxscore

Japan	90–94 (OT)	France
Scoring by quarter: 25–32, 19–17, 20–20, 20–15, Overtime: 6–10
Pts: Kawamura 29; Rebs: Hawkinson, Watanabe 8 Asts: Kawamura 6		Pts: Wembanyama 18; Rebs: Gobert 15; Asts: Fournier, Wembanyama 6

Stade Pierre-Mauroy, Lille
Attendance: 26,900
Referees: Matthew Kallio (CAN), Wojciech Liszka (POL), Blanca Burns (USA)

30 July 2024
21:00

Boxscore

Brazil	73–86	Germany
Scoring by quarter: 10–22, 30–18, 11–20, 22–26
Pts: Dos Santos 18; Rebs: Meindl 6 Asts: Dos Santos 8		Pts: Schröder 20; Rebs: Voigtmann 8 Asts: Schröder 6

Stade Pierre-Mauroy, Lille
Attendance: 23,884
Referees: Antonio Conde (ESP), Omar Bermúdez (MEX), Gatis Saliņš (LAT)

2 August 2024
11:00

Boxscore

Japan	84–102	Brazil
Scoring by quarter: 20–31, 24–24, 29–22, 11–25
Pts: Hawkinson 26; Rebs: Hawkinson 10; Asts: Kawamura 10		Pts: Caboclo 33; Rebs: Caboclo 17; Asts: Huertas 8

Stade Pierre-Mauroy, Lille
Attendance: 26,850
Referees: Matthew Kallio (CAN), Boris Krejić (SLO), Wojciech Liszka (POL)

2 August 2024
21:00

Boxscore

France	71–85	Germany
Scoring by quarter: 18–24, 9–24, 19–21, 25–16
Pts: Wembanyama 14; Rebs: Wembanyama 12; Asts: Batum 3		Pts: Schröder, F. Wagner 26; Rebs: Theis 8 Asts: Schröder 9

Stade Pierre-Mauroy, Lille
Attendance: 26,860
Referees: Antonio Conde (ESP), Juan Fernández (ARG), Andrés Bartel (URU)

=== Group C ===
Pos	Team	Pld	W	L	PF	PA	PD	Pts	Qualification
1	United States	3	3	0	317	253	+64	6	Quarterfinals
2	Serbia	3	2	1	287	261	+26	5	Quarterfinals
3	South Sudan	3	1	2	261	278	−17	4	
4	Puerto Rico	3	0	3	228	301	−73	3	

Source: FIBA
Rules for classification: 1) classification points; 2) head-to-head results; 3) head-to-head game points difference; 4) head-to-head number of game points scored.

28 July 2024
11:00

Boxscore

South Sudan	90–79	Puerto Rico
Scoring by quarter: 20–28, 28–26, 23–15, 19–10
Pts: Jones 19; Rebs: Gabriel 9 Asts: Jones 6		Pts: Alvarado 26; Rebs: Conditt IV, Romero 6 Asts: Alvarado 5

Stade Pierre-Mauroy, Lille
Attendance: 27,021
Referees: Ademir Zurapović (BIH), Takaki Kato (JPN), Martin Vulić (CRO)

28 July 2024
17:15

Boxscore

Serbia	84–110	United States
Scoring by quarter: 20–25, 29–33, 16–26, 19–26
Pts: Jokić 20; Rebs: Bogdanović 6 Asts: Jokić 8		Pts: Durant 23; Rebs: Davis 8 Asts: James 9

Stade Pierre-Mauroy, Lille
Attendance: 27,328
Referees: Yohan Rosso (FRA), Julio Anaya (PAN), Mārtiņš Kozlovskis (LAT)

31 July 2024
17:15

Boxscore

Puerto Rico	66–107	Serbia
Scoring by quarter: 12–24, 23–28, 16–27, 15–28
Pts: Ortiz 19; Rebs: Ortiz 6 Asts: Howard, Waters 3		Pts: Petrušev 15; Rebs: Jokić 15; Asts: Jokić 9

Stade Pierre-Mauroy, Lille
Attendance: 17,882
Referees: Julio Anaya (PAN), Juan Fernández (ARG), Boris Krejić (SLO)

31 July 2024
21:00

Boxscore

United States	103–86	South Sudan
Scoring by quarter: 26–14, 29–22, 18–21, 30–29
Pts: Adebayo 18; Rebs: three players 7 Asts: Booker 6		Pts: Omot 24; Rebs: Gabriel 10; Asts: Jones 7

Stade Pierre-Mauroy, Lille
Attendance: 27,056
Referees: Antonio Conde (ESP), Mārtiņš Kozlovskis (LAT), Takaki Kato (JPN)

3 August 2024
17:15

Boxscore

Puerto Rico	83–104	United States
Scoring by quarter: 29–25, 16–39, 14–23, 24–17
Pts: Alvarado 18; Rebs: Romero 10; Asts: Conditt IV 5		Pts: Edwards 26; Rebs: Tatum 10; Asts: James 8

Stade Pierre-Mauroy, Lille
Attendance: 27,244
Referees: Julio Anaya (PAN), Gatis Saliņš (LAT), Martin Vulić (CRO)

3 August 2024
21:00

Boxscore

Serbia	96–85	South Sudan
Scoring by quarter: 23–22, 24–22, 25–23, 24–18
Pts: Bogdanović 30; Rebs: Jokić 13; Asts: Bogdanović 8		Pts: Jones, Shayok 17; Rebs: Gabriel 8 Asts: Jones 10

Stade Pierre-Mauroy, Lille
Attendance: 20,916
Referees: Ademir Zurapović (BIH), Yohan Rosso (FRA), Juan Fernández (ARG)

=== Third-placed teams ranking ===
Pos	Grp	Team	Pld	W	L	PF	PA	PD	Pts	Qualification
1	B	Brazil	3	1	2	241	248	−7	4	Quarterfinals
2	A	Greece	3	1	2	233	241	−8	4	Quarterfinals
3	C	South Sudan	3	1	2	261	278	−17	4	

Source: FIBA
Rules for classification: 1) classification points; 2) game points difference; 3) number of game points scored; 4) FIBA ranking.

== Knockout stage ==
A draw after the preliminary round decided the pairings, where a seeded team played an unseeded team. Teams qualified were divided into four pots:

- Pot D comprised the top two-ranked first-placed teams from the group phase.
- Pot E comprised the lowest ranked first-placed team and the best-ranked second-placed team from the group phase.
- Pot F comprised the remaining second-placed teams from the group phase.
- Pot G comprised the two best third-placed teams.

Draw principles:

- Teams from Pot D were drawn against a team from Pot G and a team from Pot E against a team of Pot F.
- Teams from the same group could not be drawn against each other in the quarterfinals.

=== Ranking ===
Pos	Team	Pld	W	L	PF	PA	PD	Pts	Qualification
1	United States	3	3	0	317	253	+64	6	Seeded (Pot D)
2	Germany	3	3	0	268	221	+47	6	Seeded (Pot D)
3	Canada	3	3	0	267	247	+20	6	Seeded (Pot E)
4	Serbia	3	2	1	287	261	+26	5	Seeded (Pot E)
5	France	3	2	1	243	241	+2	5	Unseeded (Pot F)
6	Australia	3	1	2	246	250	−4	4	Unseeded (Pot F)
7	Brazil	3	1	2	241	248	−7	4	Unseeded (Pot G)
8	Greece	3	1	2	233	241	−8	4	Unseeded (Pot G)

Source: Olympics
Rules for classification: 1) points; 2) points difference; 3) points scored.

=== Bracket ===
Quarterfinals
6 August
France	82
Canada	73
6 August
Germany	76
Greece	63
6 August
Brazil	87
United States	122
6 August
Serbia (OT)	95
Australia	90

Semifinals
8 August
France	73
Germany	69
8 August
United States	95
Serbia	91

Gold medal
10 August
France	87
United States	98
Bronze medal
10 August
Germany	83
Serbia	93

=== Quarterfinals ===
6 August 2024
11:00

Boxscore

Germany	76–63	Greece
Scoring by quarter: 11–21, 25–15, 23–16, 17–11
Pts: F. Wagner 18; Rebs: Theis 8 Asts: Schröder 8		Pts: Antetokounmpo 22; Rebs: Papanikolaou 9 Asts: Antetokounmpo 3

Accor Arena, Paris
Attendance: 12,288
Referees: Roberto Vázquez (PUR), Mārtiņš Kozlovskis (LAT), Johnny Batista (PUR)

6 August 2024
14:30

Boxscore

Serbia	95–90 (OT)	Australia
Scoring by quarter: 17–31, 25–23, 25–11, 15–17, Overtime: 13–8
Pts: Jokić 21; Rebs: Jokić 14; Asts: Jokić 9		Pts: Mills 26; Rebs: Landale, Magnay 6 Asts: Exum 5

Accor Arena, Paris
Attendance: 12,317
Referees: Yohan Rosso (FRA), Julio Anaya (PAN), Wojciech Liszka (POL)

6 August 2024
18:00

Boxscore

France	82–73	Canada
Scoring by quarter: 23–10, 22–19, 16–21, 21–23
Pts: Yabusele 22; Rebs: Wembanyama 12; Asts: Wembanyama 5		Pts: Gilgeous-Alexander 27; Rebs: Powell 9 Asts: Gilgeous-Alexander 4

Accor Arena, Paris
Attendance: 12,258
Referees: Ademir Zurapović (BIH), Omar Bermúdez (MEX), Gatis Saliņš (LAT)

6 August 2024
21:30

Boxscore

Brazil	87–122	United States
Scoring by quarter: 21–33, 15–30, 35–31, 16–28
Pts: Caboclo 30; Rebs: Georginho 8 Asts: Meindl 7		Pts: Booker 18; Rebs: Davis 8 Asts: James 9

Accor Arena, Paris
Attendance: 12,364
Referees: Antonio Conde (ESP), Luis Castillo (ESP), Yevgeniy Mikheyev (KAZ)

=== Semifinals ===
8 August 2024
17:30

Boxscore

France	73–69	Germany
Scoring by quarter: 18–25, 15–8, 23–17, 17–19
Pts: Yabusele 17; Rebs: three players 7 Asts: Wembanyama 4		Pts: Schröder 18; Rebs: Theis 11; Asts: Theis 6

Accor Arena, Paris
Attendance: 12,454
Referees: Antonio Conde (ESP), Boris Krejić (SLO), Wojciech Liszka (POL)

8 August 2024
21:00

Boxscore

United States	95–91	Serbia
Scoring by quarter: 23–31, 20–23, 20–22, 32–15
Pts: Curry 36; Rebs: James 12; Asts: James 10		Pts: Bogdanović 20; Rebs: three players 5 Asts: Jokić 11

Accor Arena, Paris
Attendance: 12,213
Referees: Ademir Zurapović (BIH), Julio Anaya (PAN), Mārtiņš Kozlovskis (LAT)

=== Bronze medal game ===
10 August 2024
11:00

Boxscore

Germany	83–93	Serbia
Scoring by quarter: 21–30, 17–16, 25–26, 20–21
Pts: F. Wagner 18; Rebs: F. Wagner 9 Asts: Schröder, Weiler-Babb 6		Pts: Jokić, Micić 19; Rebs: Jokić 12; Asts: Jokić 11

Accor Arena, Paris
Attendance: 12,406
Referees: Matthew Kallio (CAN), Yohan Rosso (FRA), Johnny Batista (PUR)

=== Gold medal game ===
10 August 2024
21:30

Boxscore

France	87–98	United States
Scoring by quarter: 15–20, 26–29, 25–23, 21–26
Pts: Wembanyama 26; Rebs: Batum 8 Asts: Batum 4		Pts: Curry 24; Rebs: Davis 9 Asts: James 10

Accor Arena, Paris
Attendance: 12,121
Referees: Antonio Conde (ESP), Julio Anaya (PAN), Wojciech Liszka (POL)

Team details

France	United States

PG	1	Frank Ntilikina
SG	8	Isaïa Cordinier
SF	5	Nicolas Batum
PF	7	Guerschon Yabusele
C	32	Victor Wembanyama
PG	12	Nando de Colo
SG	10	Evan Fournier
SF	99	Bilal Coulibaly
PF	26	Mathias Lessort
C	27	Rudy Gobert
Head Coach:
(France) Vincent Collet

PG	4	Stephen Curry
SG	15	Devin Booker
SF	6	LeBron James
PF	7	Kevin Durant
C	11	Joel Embiid
PG	12	Jrue Holiday
SG	5	Anthony Edwards
SF	10	Jayson Tatum
PF	14	Anthony Davis
C	13	Bam Adebayo
Head Coach:
(United States) Steve Kerr

== Statistics and awards ==
=== Statistical leaders ===
==== Players ====
Points

Player	PPG
(Greece) Giannis Antetokounmpo	25.8
(Canada) Shai Gilgeous-Alexander	21.0
(Japan) Yuki Kawamura	20.3
(Canada) RJ Barrett	19.8
(Serbia) Nikola Jokić	18.8

Rebounds

Player	RPG
(Serbia) Nikola Jokić	10.7
(Japan) Josh Hawkinson	9.7
(France) Victor Wembanyama	9.7
(Spain) Santi Aldama	9.3
(South Sudan) Wenyen Gabriel	9.0

Assists

Player	APG
(Serbia) Nikola Jokić	8.7
(United States) LeBron James	8.5
(Japan) Yuki Kawamura	7.7
(South Sudan) Carlik Jones	7.7
(Germany) Dennis Schröder	7.5

Blocks

Player	BPG
(South Sudan) Wenyen Gabriel	2.0
(Spain) Santi Aldama	1.7
(Japan) Yuta Watanabe	1.7
(France) Victor Wembanyama	1.7
(United States) Anthony Davis	1.5

Steals

Player	SPG
(Germany) Franz Wagner	2.0
(France) Victor Wembanyama	2.0
(South Sudan) Nuni Omot	2.0
(Serbia) Nikola Jokić	2.0
(South Sudan) Bul Kuol	1.7
(Serbia) Aleksa Avramović	1.7

Efficiency

Player	EFFPG
(Serbia) Nikola Jokić	31
(Greece) Giannis Antetokounmpo	26.5
(Japan) Josh Hawkinson	24.7
(United States) LeBron James	23.5
(Spain) Santi Aldama	22.7

==== Teams ====
Points

Team	PPG
United States	105.3
Serbia	94.3
South Sudan	87.0
Canada	85.0
Australia	84.0

Rebounds

Team	RPG
South Sudan	42.7
Australia	40.3
United States	39.8
Serbia	38.8
Japan	38.0

Assists

Team	APG
United States	28.0
Serbia	24.2
Spain	21.3
Brazil	20.8
Australia	19.8
France	19.8

Blocks

Team	BPG
United States	5.2
France	4.8
Japan	4.3
South Sudan	3.3
Spain	3.3

Steals

Team	SPG
South Sudan	9.3
United States	9.3
Serbia	8.7
Puerto Rico	8.7
Brazil	8.0

Efficiency

Team	EFFPG
United States	137.8
Serbia	114.5
Germany	97.7
South Sudan	97.0
France	92.7

=== Awards ===
The awards were announced by FIBA on 10 August 2024, following the conclusion of the tournament.

FIBA All-Star Five
Guards	Forward	Centers
(United States) Stephen Curry (Germany) Dennis Schröder	(United States) LeBron James	(Serbia) Nikola Jokić (France) Victor Wembanyama
FIBA All-Second Team
Guards	Forwards	
(Serbia) Bogdan Bogdanović (Canada) Shai Gilgeous-Alexander	(Greece) Giannis Antetokounmpo (Germany) Franz Wagner (France) Guerschon Yabusele	
MVP: (United States) LeBron James
Rising Star: (France) Victor Wembanyama
Best Defensive Player: (Serbia) Aleksa Avramović
Best Coach: (France) Vincent Collet

2024 Olympic Basketball champions

United States
Seventeenth title

== Final ranking ==
Rankings were determined by:

- 1st–4th:
  - Results of gold and bronze medal games
- 5th–8th:
  - Win–loss record of the teams eliminated in the quarterfinals
- 9th–12th:
  - Teams eliminated in the preliminary round groups were classified 9th–12th based on the win–loss record in the preliminary round group.

Pos	Team	Pld	W	L
1st place, gold medalist(s)	United States	6	6	0
2nd place, silver medalist(s)	France	6	4	2
3rd place, bronze medalist(s)	Serbia	6	4	2
4	Germany	6	4	2
5	Canada	4	3	1
6	Australia	4	1	3
7	Brazil	4	1	3
8	Greece	4	1	3
9	South Sudan	3	1	2
10	Spain	3	1	2
11	Japan	3	0	3
12	Puerto Rico	3	0	3

Source: Olympics

== See also ==
- Basketball at the 2024 Summer Olympics – Women's tournament
