= FIBA Men's Olympics All-Star Five =

Five best men's basketball players of the Summer Olympics

The FIBA Summer Olympics All-Star Five is an award for the sport of basketball given by FIBA to the five best men's players of the Summer Olympic Games.

== FIBA All-Star Five by tournament ==
*	Inducted into the Naismith Memorial Basketball Hall of Fame
**	Inducted into the FIBA Hall of Fame
***	Inducted into both the Naismith and FIBA Halls of Fame
	Denotes player who is still active
Player (X)	Denotes the number of times the player has been selected
**Player** **(in bold text)**	Indicates the player who won the event's Most Valuable Player award

Year	Player	Position	National Team	Ref.
2020	Ricky Rubio	Guard	Spain	
2020	Patty Mills	Guard	Australia	
2020	Luka Dončić	Forward	Slovenia	
2020	**Kevin Durant**	Forward	United States	
2020	Rudy Gobert	Center	France	
2024	Dennis Schröder	Guard	Germany	
2024	Stephen Curry	Guard	United States	
2024	**LeBron James**	Forward	United States	
2024	Victor Wembanyama	Center	France	
2024	Nikola Jokić	Center	Serbia	

== FIBA All-Second Team by tournament ==
Year	Player	Position	National Team	Ref.
2024	Shai Gilgeous-Alexander	Guard	Canada	
2024	Bogdan Bogdanović	Guard	Serbia	
2024	Franz Wagner	Forward	Germany	
2024	Guerschon Yabusele	Forward	France	
2024	Giannis Antetokounmpo	Forward	Greece	

== FIBA Summer Olympics 1992–2020 Dream Team ==
The 1992–2020 FIBA Summer Olympics Dream Team consisted of five men's basketball players at each position that had previously competed at the Summer Olympic Games, beginning with the 1992 tournament when NBA players first participated.

*	Inducted into the Naismith Memorial Basketball Hall of Fame
**	Inducted into the FIBA Hall of Fame
***	Inducted into both the Naismith and FIBA Halls of Fame

*Players listed by position, and in alphabetical order:

FIBA Summer Olympics
1992–2020 Dream Team
Point Guard
(Federal Republic of Yugoslavia) Saša Đorđević
(United States) Magic Johnson*
(Canada) Steve Nash***
(France) Tony Parker*
(Greece) Vassilis Spanoulis
Shooting Guard
(United States) Kobe Bryant*
(Croatia) Dražen Petrović***
(Argentina) Manu Ginóbili*
(United States) Michael Jordan***
(Spain) Juan Carlos Navarro
Small Forward
(United States) Larry Bird*
(United States) LeBron James
(Croatia) Toni Kukoč***
(United States) Scottie Pippen*
(Brazil) Oscar Schmidt***
Power Forward
(United States) Tim Duncan*
(United States) Kevin Durant
(Spain) Pau Gasol*
(Germany) Dirk Nowitzki***
(Argentina) Luis Scola
Center
(Federal Republic of Yugoslavia) Vlade Divac***
(United States) Hakeem Olajuwon***
(Croatia) Dino Rađja*
(Lithuania) Arvydas Sabonis***
(China) Yao Ming***
