= Victor Wembanyama =

French basketball player (born 2004)

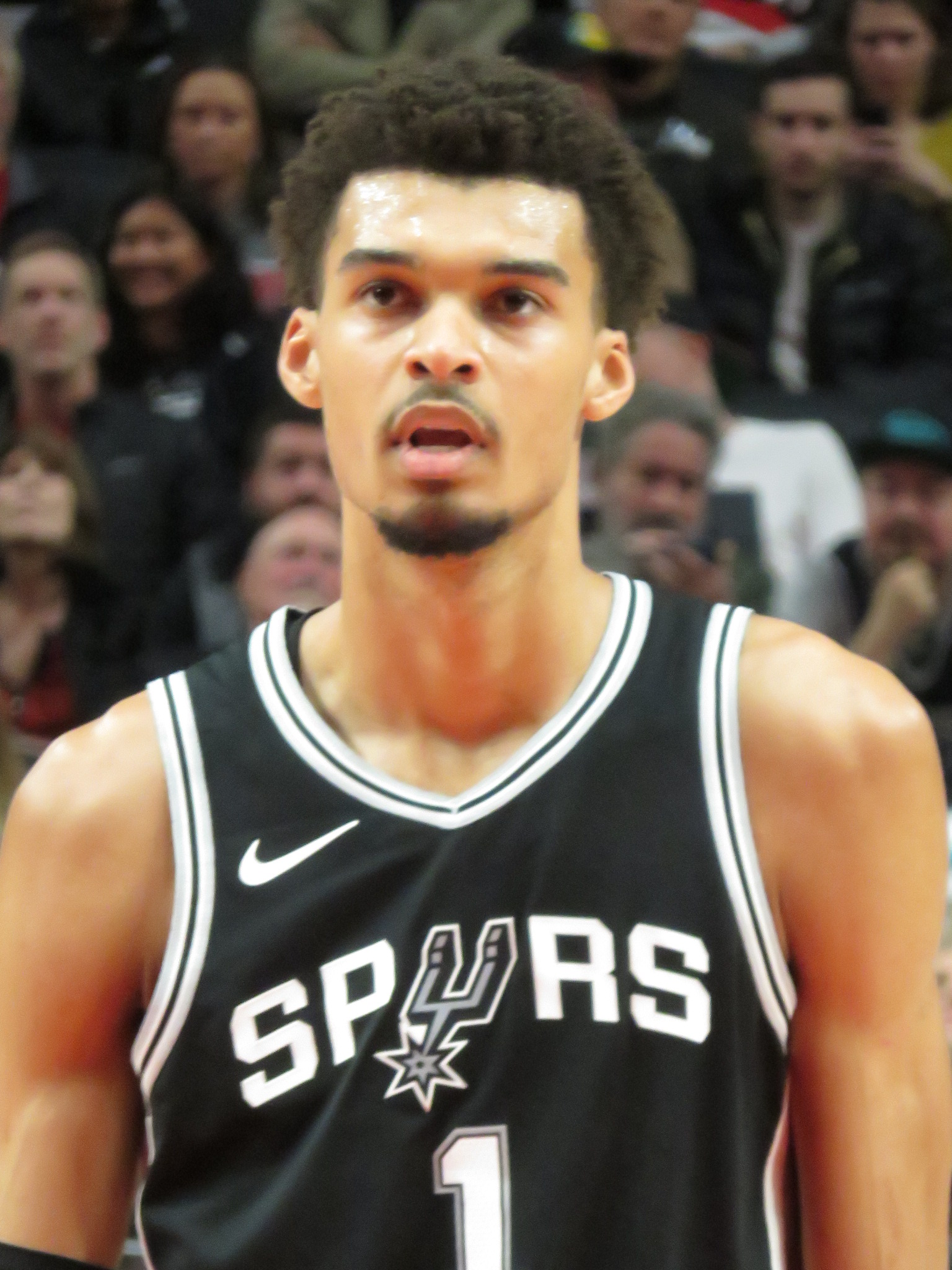
- Wembanyama with the San Antonio Spurs in 2024

No. 1 – San Antonio Spurs
- Position: Center / power forward
- League: NBA

Personal information
- Born: 4 January 2004 (age 22) Le Chesnay, France
- Listed height: 7 ft 4 in (2.24 m)
- Listed weight: 235 lb (107 kg)

Career information
- NBA draft: 2023: 1st round, 1st overall pick
- Drafted by: San Antonio Spurs
- Playing career: 2019–present

Career history
- 2019–2021: Nanterre 92
- 2020–2021: →Centre Fédéral
- 2021–2022: ASVEL
- 2022–2023: Metropolitans 92
- 2023–present: San Antonio Spurs

Career highlights
- 2× NBA All-Star (2025, 2026); All-NBA First Team (2026); NBA Defensive Player of the Year (2026); 2× NBA All-Defensive First Team (2024, 2026); NBA Rookie of the Year (2024); NBA All-Rookie First Team (2024); NBA Western Conference finals MVP (2026); 3× NBA blocks leader (2024–2026); French Player of the Year (2023); LNB Élite champion (2022); LNB Élite MVP (2023); All-LNB Élite First Team (2023); LNB Élite Best Scorer (2023); LNB Élite Best Defender (2023); LNB Élite Best Blocker (2023); LNB Élite All-Star Game MVP (2022); 2× LNB Élite All-Star (2021, 2022); 3× LNB Élite Best Young Player (2021–2023)
- Stats at NBA.com
- Stats at Basketball Reference
Medals
Men's basketball
Representing France
Summer Olympics
Silver medal – second place	2024 Paris	Team
FIBA Under-19 World Cup
Silver medal – second place	2021 Latvia	Team
FIBA U16 European Championship
Silver medal – second place	2019 Italy	Team

Victor Nonga Wembanyama-de Fautereau-Vassel (/ˌwɛmbənˈjɑːmə/ WEM-bən-YAH-mə; French: [viktɔʁ wɛmbanjama]; born 4 January 2004), nicknamed "Wemby" and "the Alien", is a French professional basketball player for the San Antonio Spurs of the National Basketball Association (NBA). He was selected first overall by the Spurs in the 2023 NBA draft and is considered one of the best basketball prospects ever due to his rare combination of height, agility, and skills.

Wembanyama began his professional career at age 15 with Nanterre 92 of the LNB Pro A in 2019. Two years later, he moved to ASVEL and won the Pro A title in his only season with the team. In the 2022–23 season, Wembanyama signed with Metropolitans 92 and became the youngest player to win the Pro A MVP award, while earning Pro A Best Defender honours and leading the league in scoring, rebounds and blocks. He was unanimously named an LNB All-Star twice, winning the All-Star Game MVP once, and was a three-time Pro A Best Young Player from 2021 to 2023.

Following a historic rookie season in the NBA in which he led the league in blocks per game, Wembanyama was unanimously named the 2024 NBA Rookie of the Year and became the first rookie and youngest player ever to be named to the All-Defensive First Team. During the 2025–26 season, Wembanyama became the youngest and first unanimous winner of the Defensive Player of the Year award. That same year, he led the Spurs to the NBA Finals in his first postseason appearance.

Wembanyama also plays for the French national team, with whom he won a silver medal at the 2024 Olympics. At the youth level, he led his team to two silver medals, including at the 2021 FIBA Under-19 World Cup, where he set the FIBA record for blocks per game in a single tournament.

== Early life and youth career ==
Victor Nonga Wembanyama-de Fautereau-Vassel was born on 4 January 2004, in Le Chesnay, in the Paris region. His father, Félix, was born in Belgium and is of Congolese origin. He was a track and field athlete who competed in the high jump, long jump and triple jump. Félix acquired French nationality by naturalisation on 10 February 2003. Victor's mother, Élodie de Fautereau, is a French basketball coach and former player. Wembanyama's father and mother are 1.98 m (6 ft 6 in) and 1.91 m (6 ft 3 in) tall, respectively. His older sister, Ève, plays basketball professionally, and his younger brother, Oscar, has played basketball and handball at the youth level. His maternal grandfather, Michel de Fautereau, played professional basketball, and his grandmother, Marie-Christine, also played the sport.

Wembanyama played football as a goalkeeper and practised judo before focusing on basketball. He learned to play basketball from his mother, who was coaching youth teams. At age seven, Wembanyama began playing for Entente Le Chesnay Versailles, before joining the youth system of Nanterre 92 at age 10. He drew the attention of Nanterre in 2013 after Michaël Allard, a youth coach for the club, noticed him on the bench at an under-11 game due to his exceptional height, at 1.80 m (5 ft 11 in), initially mistaking him for a coach. In February 2018, Wembanyama was loaned to FC Barcelona for the Minicopa del Rey, an under-14 tournament in Spain, leading his team to third place. He declined an offer to continue his career with Barcelona, saying that the coaches were not willing to challenge him.

== Professional career ==
=== Nanterre 92 (2019–2021) ===
In the 2019–20 season, Wembanyama gained his first professional experience with the Nanterre 92 senior team under head coach Pascal Donnadieu, receiving limited playing time in two games. He primarily competed in LNB Espoirs, the French under-21 league, and also played for the under-18 team. Wembanyama made his professional debut on 29 October 2019, playing 31 seconds against Brescia in the EuroCup. At 15 years, nine months and 25 days old, he was the second-youngest player after Stefan Petković to play in the EuroCup. In February 2020, Wembanyama played for Nanterre's under-18 team at the Kaunas qualifying tournament for the Adidas Next Generation Tournament (ANGT). On 8 February, he posted 22 points, 15 rebounds and an ANGT-record nine blocks in a win over the under-18 team of Zaragoza. Wembanyama averaged 15.8 points, 12 rebounds, 2.8 steals, and six blocks per game in Kaunas, leading the tournament in blocks and earning all-tournament team honours. He finished the Espoirs season averaging 10.2 points, 4.9 rebounds and 3.3 blocks per game, mostly coming off the bench.

In the 2020–21 season, Wembanyama split time between Nanterre's senior and under-21 teams and signed an agreement to also play for Centre Fédéral in the Nationale Masculine 1 (NM1). On 23 September 2020, he made his LNB Pro A debut, grabbing one rebound in four minutes against JL Bourg. In October, Wembanyama featured in a viral video where he showcased his skills in a two-on-two pick-up game against Rudy Gobert and Vincent Poirier. On 12 December, he suffered a stress fracture in his fibula during an Espoirs game against BCM Gravelines-Dunkerque, with an estimated recovery time of eight weeks. Wembanyama was sidelined from the Valencia qualifying tournament for the ANGT. After missing two and a half months with injury, he began receiving more playing time with the senior team. On 25 May 2021, Wembanyama recorded season-highs of 14 points and 10 rebounds in a 99–87 win over Orléans Loiret. He started in 10 of 18 Pro A appearances, averaging 6.8 points and 4.7 rebounds per game, and was named Pro A Best Young Player. In Espoirs, Wembanyama averaged 13.4 points, 8.6 rebounds and 3.2 blocks, starting in all five of his games. He played four games for Centre Fédéral, averaging 11.8 points, 6.8 rebounds and three blocks per game. Following the season, he opted to leave Nanterre.

=== ASVEL (2021–2022) ===
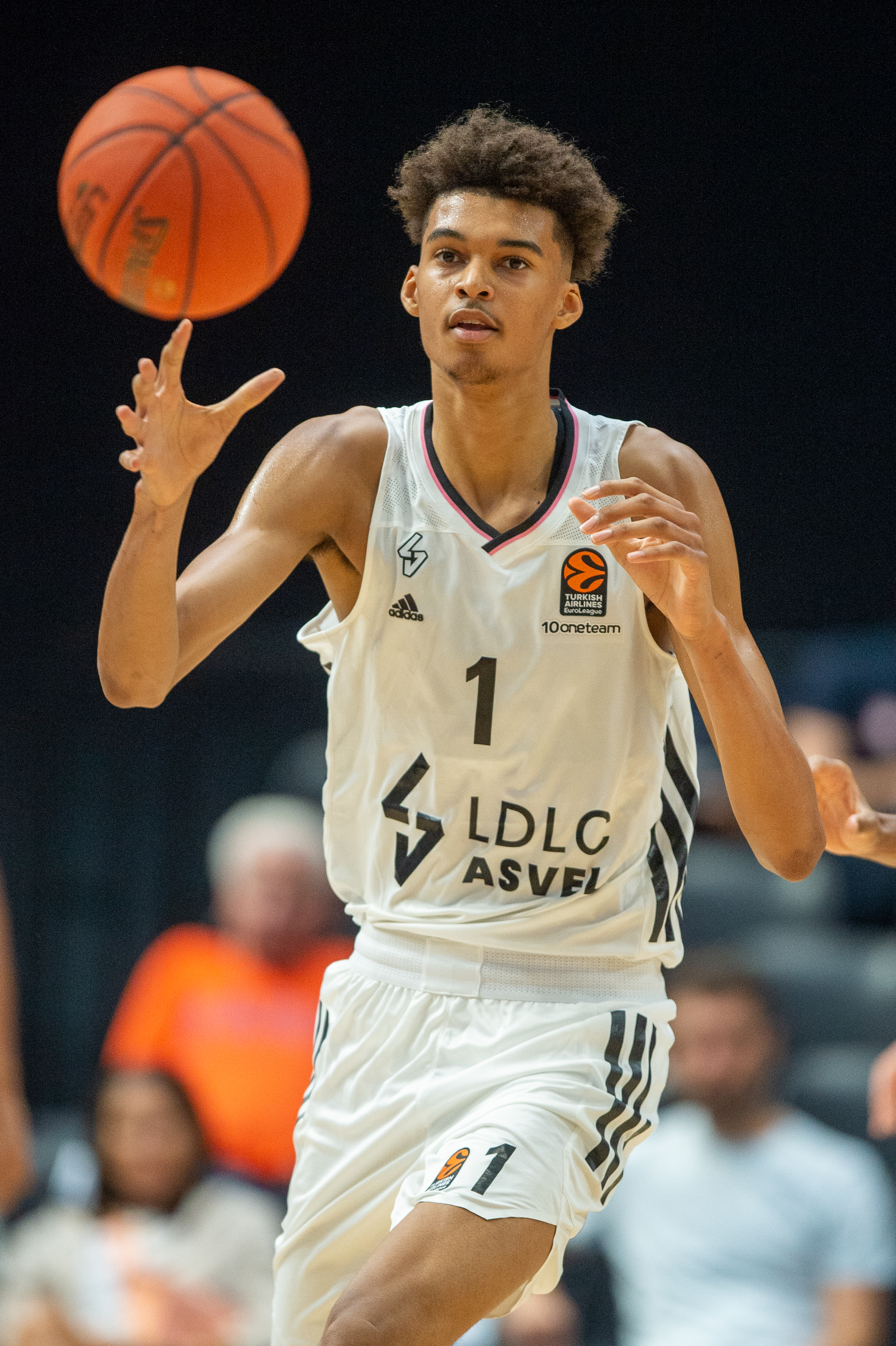
Wembanyama with ASVEL in 2021

On 29 June 2021, Wembanyama signed a three-year contract with ASVEL of the Pro A and the EuroLeague. He was unable to play for one month at the start of the season because of an illness. On 1 October, Wembanyama made his EuroLeague debut, recording one block in three minutes in an 88–76 win over Žalgiris. On 10 November, ASVEL announced that he would miss two to three weeks with a fractured finger. He returned on 2 December, but was sidelined again on 20 December, after suffering a bone bruise in his right shoulder against Zenit Saint Petersburg, with an estimated recovery time of four to six weeks. Wembanyama was selected to the LNB All-Star Game, held on 29 December, but was unable to play due to the injury. He made his return on 11 February. On 3 April, Wembanyama recorded a season-high 25 points, seven rebounds and three blocks in an 85–65 win over Le Portel. He scored 18 points, his career high in the EuroLeague, in an 81–80 loss to Olimpia Milano on 7 April. On 3 June, Wembanyama was ruled out for the remainder of the season with a psoas muscle injury he sustained during a Pro A semifinal game against JDA Dijon. In his absence, ASVEL won its third consecutive Pro A championship. Wembanyama repeated as Pro A Best Young Player, averaging 9.4 points and 5.1 rebounds per game in the league. He averaged 6.5 points and 3.8 rebounds per game in the EuroLeague and finished second to Rokas Jokubaitis in voting for the EuroLeague Rising Star award. After the season, he opted out of his contract with ASVEL, despite promises from club president Tony Parker to build the team around him for the next season.

=== Metropolitans 92 (2022–2023) ===
On 4 July 2022, Wembanyama signed a two-year contract with Metropolitans 92 of the LNB Pro A. He was drawn to the team due to head coach Vincent Collet's reputation for developing and providing opportunities for young players. In October 2022, Wembanyama gained recognition from American media after two exhibition games against the NBA G League Ignite, featuring projected second overall pick Scoot Henderson, in Las Vegas. The games, which marked Wembanyama's U.S. debut, were nationally televised and attended by over 200 scouts and NBA executives. In the first game, on 4 October, he recorded 37 points, five blocks and four rebounds in a 122–115 loss. Wembanyama led his team to a 112–106 win over the Ignite in their second game, scoring 36 points and grabbing 11 rebounds. On 27 October, the NBA announced that it would stream all Metropolitans 92 regular-season and playoff games on its app.

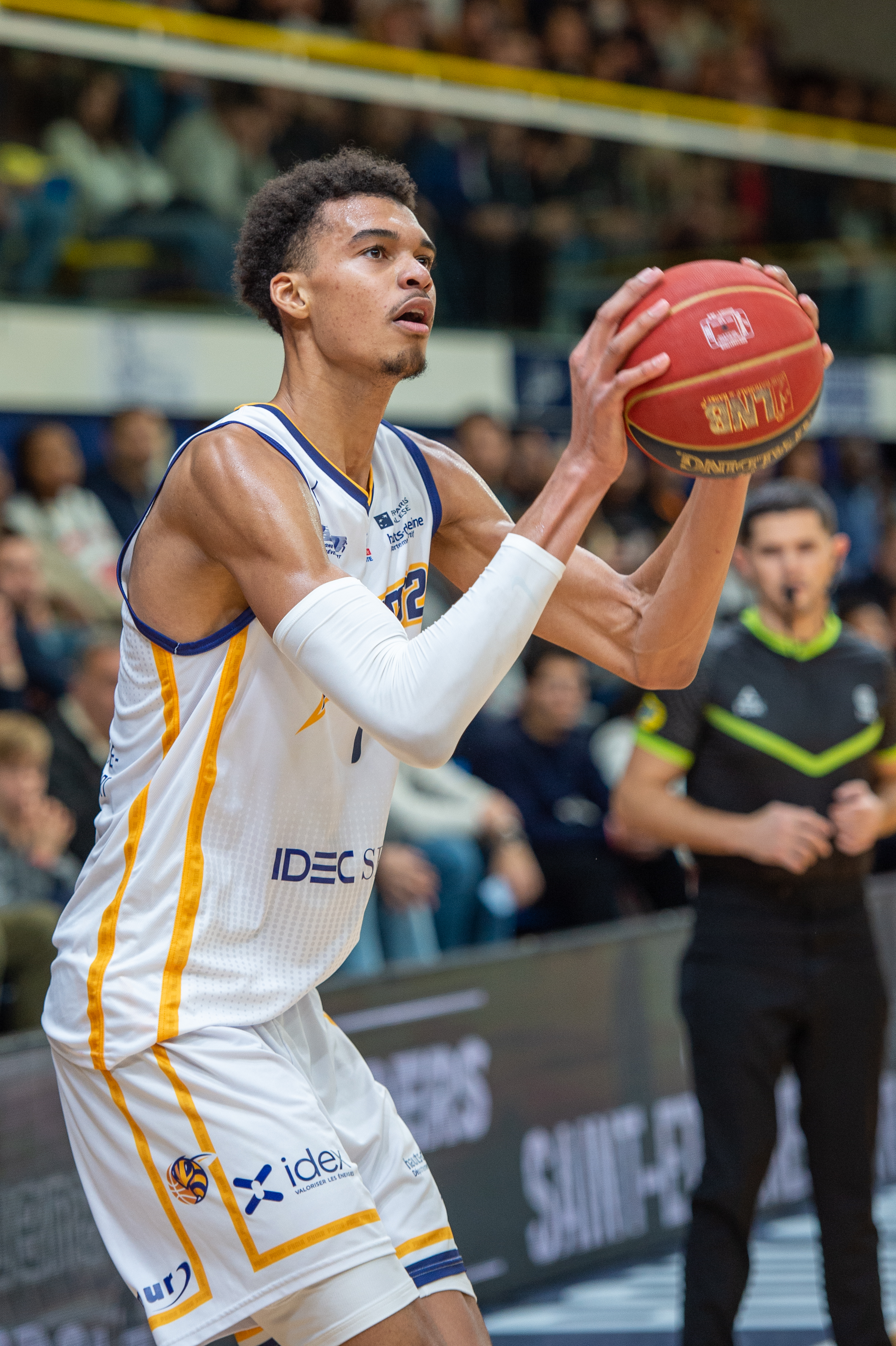
Wembanyama with Metropolitans 92 in 2022

In the 2022–23 Pro A season, Wembanyama emerged as one of the most dominant players in the league. On 4 November 2022, he posted a career-high 33 points, 12 rebounds, four assists and three blocks in a 78–69 win over Limoges CSP. On 2 December, Wembanyama recorded his fourth straight 30-point game, with 32 points, 10 rebounds, four blocks and three assists in a 96–85 victory over Fos Provence, leading his team to its ninth consecutive win. He was named captain of the France team at the LNB All-Star Game on 29 December. At the All-Star Game, he recorded 27 points, 12 rebounds and four assists, leading his team to 136–128 win over the World team, and became the game's youngest MVP. On 9 January 2023, Wembanyama made a game-winning putback dunk with 3.5 seconds left in regulation and recorded 15 points, nine rebounds and five blocks in an 84–83 win over ASVEL. On 27 January, he recorded 31 points, 14 rebounds and five blocks in a 102–84 loss to Chorale Roanne. On 21 April, he declared for the 2023 NBA draft. At the end of the regular season, Wembanyama became the youngest player to win the LNB Pro A MVP Award. He was selected to the All-Pro A First Team and named Best Defender, Best Scorer, Best Young Player and Best Blocker. In the playoffs, Wembanyama led Metropolitans 92 to the Finals, where they were eliminated by AS Monaco in a 3–0 sweep. He finished the season averaging 21.6 points, 10.4 rebounds and 3.1 blocks per game, leading the Pro A in each category.

=== San Antonio Spurs (2023–present) ===
==== 2023–24 season: Unanimous Rookie of the Year ====
On 22 June 2023, Wembanyama was selected by the San Antonio Spurs with the first overall pick in the 2023 NBA draft. He became the first French player to be drafted first overall, and only the second European player to achieve this distinction (following Andrea Bargnani in 2006). He became the third #1 overall pick by San Antonio in its history, after David Robinson and Tim Duncan.

Wembanyama made his NBA Summer League debut on 7 July against the Charlotte Hornets in front of a sold-out crowd. He recorded nine points and eight rebounds but made only two of 13 shots in a 76–68 win. In his second Summer League game on 9 July, he put up 27 points and 12 rebounds in a 85–80 loss to the Portland Trail Blazers. The next day, the Spurs announced that he would sit out for the remainder of the 2023 Summer League.

On 25 October, Wembanyama made his NBA regular-season debut putting up 15 points, five rebounds, two assists, and two blocks in a 126–119 loss to the Dallas Mavericks. His three three-pointers made set a Spurs' single-game team record for a rookie in his debut. On 2 November, Wembanyama put up a then career-high 38 points alongside 10 rebounds, and two blocks in a 132–121 win over the Phoenix Suns. He joined LeBron James and Kevin Durant as the only teenagers in NBA history to put up at least 35 points, 10 rebounds, and two blocks in a game. On 5 November, he put up 20 points, nine rebounds, and five blocks in a 123–116 overtime loss to the Toronto Raptors. He became the first Spurs rookie since Tim Duncan to put up 20 points and five blocks in a game. On 18 November, he put up 19 points, 13 rebounds, four assists, and eight blocks in a 120–108 loss to the Memphis Grizzlies. He joined Tim Duncan and David Robinson as the only players in Spurs history to put up at least eight blocks in a game as a rookie.

On 8 December, Wembanyama put up 21 points and 20 rebounds in a 121–112 loss to the Chicago Bulls. He became the youngest player in NBA history to put up at least 20 points and 20 rebounds in a game at 19 years and 338 days old, surpassing the previous record set by Dwight Howard. On 13 December, he put up 30 points, 12 rebounds, and six blocks in a 122–119 loss to the Los Angeles Lakers. On 17 December, he put up 17 points and 13 rebounds in a 146–110 loss to the New Orleans Pelicans. He also surpassed Dwight Howard's record for the most consecutive games with a double-double by a teenager in NBA history with his eighth double-double. On 28 December, he put up 30 points, six rebounds, six assists, and seven blocks in a 118–105 win over the Portland Trail Blazers. He also became the first teenager in NBA history to put up at least 20 points, five rebounds, five assists, and five blocks in a game.

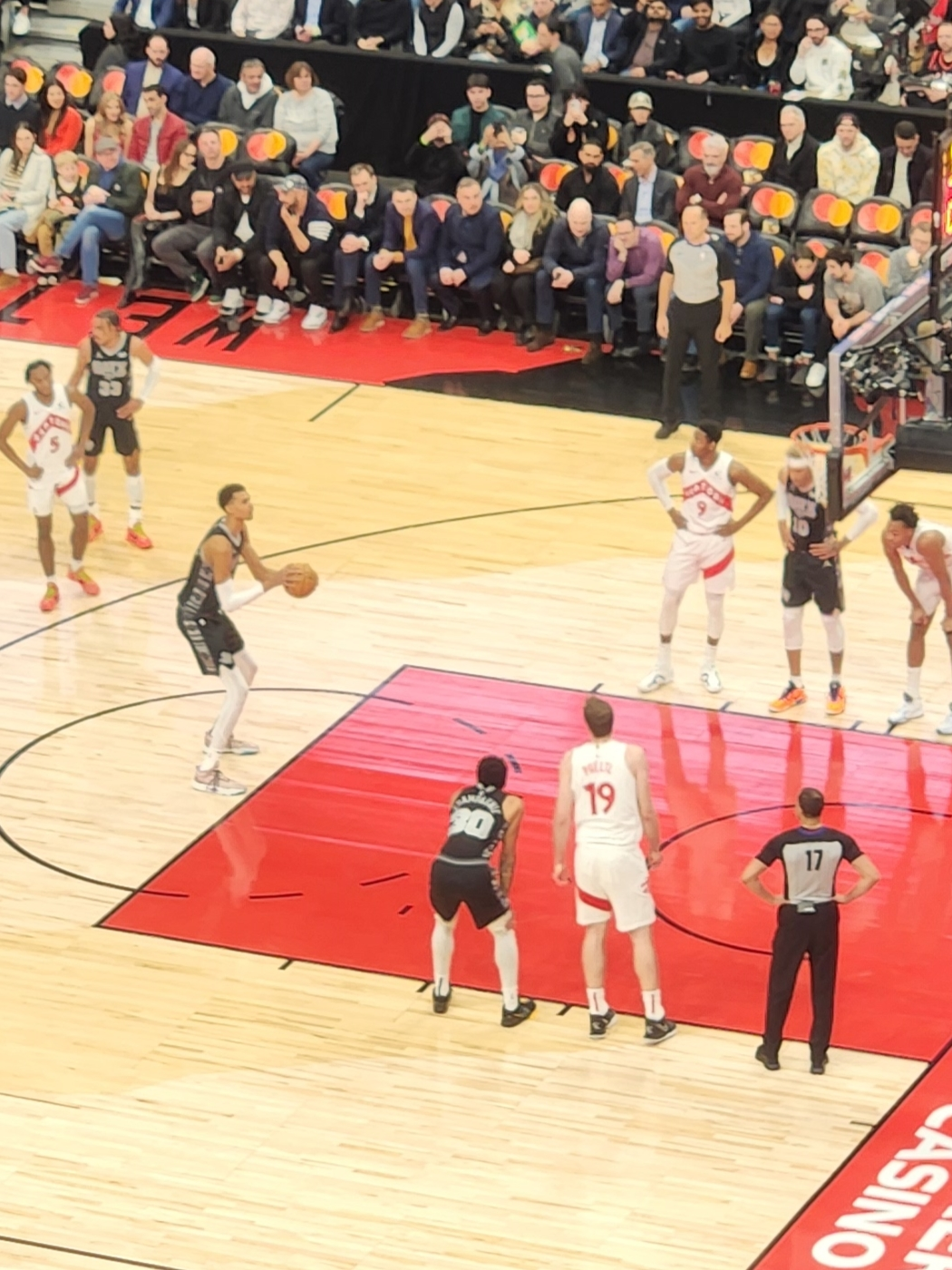
Wembanyama shooting a free throw in 2024

On 10 January 2024, Wembanyama put up his first career triple-double with 16 points, 12 rebounds, and 10 assists in a 130–108 win over the Detroit Pistons. On 12 February, he had his second career triple-double with 27 points, 14 rebounds, and 10 blocks in a 122–99 win over the Toronto Raptors. He became the first player to achieve a triple-double via points, rebounds, and blocks since Clint Capela in 2021. He also became the first player in NBA history to put up a 20-point, 10-block triple-double in fewer than 30 minutes played. On 23 February, Wembanyama put up a five-by-five with 27 points, 10 rebounds, eight assists, five steals, and five blocks in a 123–118 loss to the Los Angeles Lakers. He became the youngest player in NBA history to record a five-by-five and did so in 30 minutes, the fewest minutes played in NBA history to achieve such a feat. On 3 March, he put up 31 points, 12 rebounds, six assists, six blocks, and one steal in a 117–105 win over the Indiana Pacers. He became the first rookie in NBA history to have back-to-back games of at least 25 points, 10 rebounds, five assists, and five blocks. He also joined Tim Duncan and David Robinson (all on the Spurs) as the only rookies in NBA history to put up at least 30 points, 10 rebounds, five assists, and five blocks in a game. On 15 March, he put up 17 points, nine rebounds, two assists, two steals, and three blocks in a 117–106 loss to the Denver Nuggets. He joined Raef LaFrentz as the only players in NBA history to put up 200+ blocks and make 100+ three-pointers in a season. He also became the first rookie since Tim Duncan to put up at least 200 blocks in a season. On 29 March, he put up a then career-high 40 points along with 20 rebounds and seven assists in a 130–126 overtime win over the New York Knicks. He finished the season as the first player in NBA history to put up at least 1,500 points, 250 blocks, and 100 made three-pointers in a season. At 3.6 blocks per game, he also became the youngest player to lead the NBA in blocks for a season at 20 years, 101 days (on 14 April, 2024).

On 6 May 2024, Wembanyama was named the 2024 NBA Rookie of the Year, becoming the sixth rookie to ever win the award by a unanimous vote. He also joined Manute Bol as the only rookies in NBA history to lead the league in blocks per game and total blocks in a season. Wembanyama also finished second place in voting for the 2024 NBA Defensive Player of the Year Award, behind Rudy Gobert. Wembanyama was named to the NBA All-Defensive First Team, becoming the first rookie and youngest player in NBA history to achieve this feat.

==== 2024–25 season: First All-Star selection and season-ending illness ====
On 31 October 2024, Wembanyama had his second career five-by-five, putting up 25 points, nine rebounds, seven assists, five steals, and five blocks. He became the third player in NBA history to record multiple five-by-five games, joining Hakeem Olajuwon and Andrei Kirilenko. On 4 November, Wembanyama put up a statline of 24 points, 13 rebounds, three assists, three steals and nine blocks, in a 113–104 loss against the Los Angeles Clippers. On 9 November, Wembanyama put up 24 points, 16 rebounds, seven blocks, and shot six-of-nine from three-point range in a 111–110 loss to the Utah Jazz. He also became the first player in NBA history to have multiple games with 20+ points, 15+ rebounds, 5+ three-pointers, and 5+ blocks. On 13 November, Wembanyama scored a then career-high 50 points, including a career-high eight three-pointers in a 139–130 win over the Washington Wizards. Aged 20 years and 314 days, he also became the fourth-youngest player to score 50 points in an NBA game, as well as the first player in league history with 20 three-pointers and 13 blocks in a three-game span.

On 21 December, Wembanyama posted 30 points and tied his career-high 10 blocks in a 114–94 win over the Portland Trail Blazers. He became just the sixth player in league history to record 30-plus points and 10-plus blocks in a game, joining Hakeem Olajuwon (5x), David Robinson (3x), Artis Gilmore, Dwight Howard and Kareem Abdul-Jabbar. At 20 years and 352 days old, Wembanyama is the youngest player to ever hit the mark, breaking Dwight Howard’s previous record by nearly two years. He became the first player with four 3-pointers and 10 blocks in a game in NBA history. Wembanyama also had a block in 62 straight games, surpassing the franchise record of 61 set by David Robinson. On 25 December, he made his Christmas Day debut, registering 42 points, 18 rebounds, 4 assists, and 4 blocks in a 117–114 loss to the New York Knicks. He became the third player in NBA history to score 40+ points and 15+ rebounds in a Christmas game, after Wilt Chamberlain (1959 and 1961) and Nikola Jokić (2022). He also scored the third-most points for a player in his Christmas Day debut, behind Chamberlain (45) and Tracy McGrady (43).

On 30 January 2025, Wembanyama was named as reserve for the 2025 NBA All-Star Game, his first selection. On 20 February, the Spurs shut Wembanyama down for the remainder of the season after discovering deep vein thrombosis in his right shoulder. At the time the condition was discovered, he was averaging 24.3 points, 11.0 rebounds, 3.7 assists, and led the NBA with 3.8 blocks in 46 games.

==== 2025–26 season: Unanimous Defensive Player of the Year and first NBA Finals appearance ====
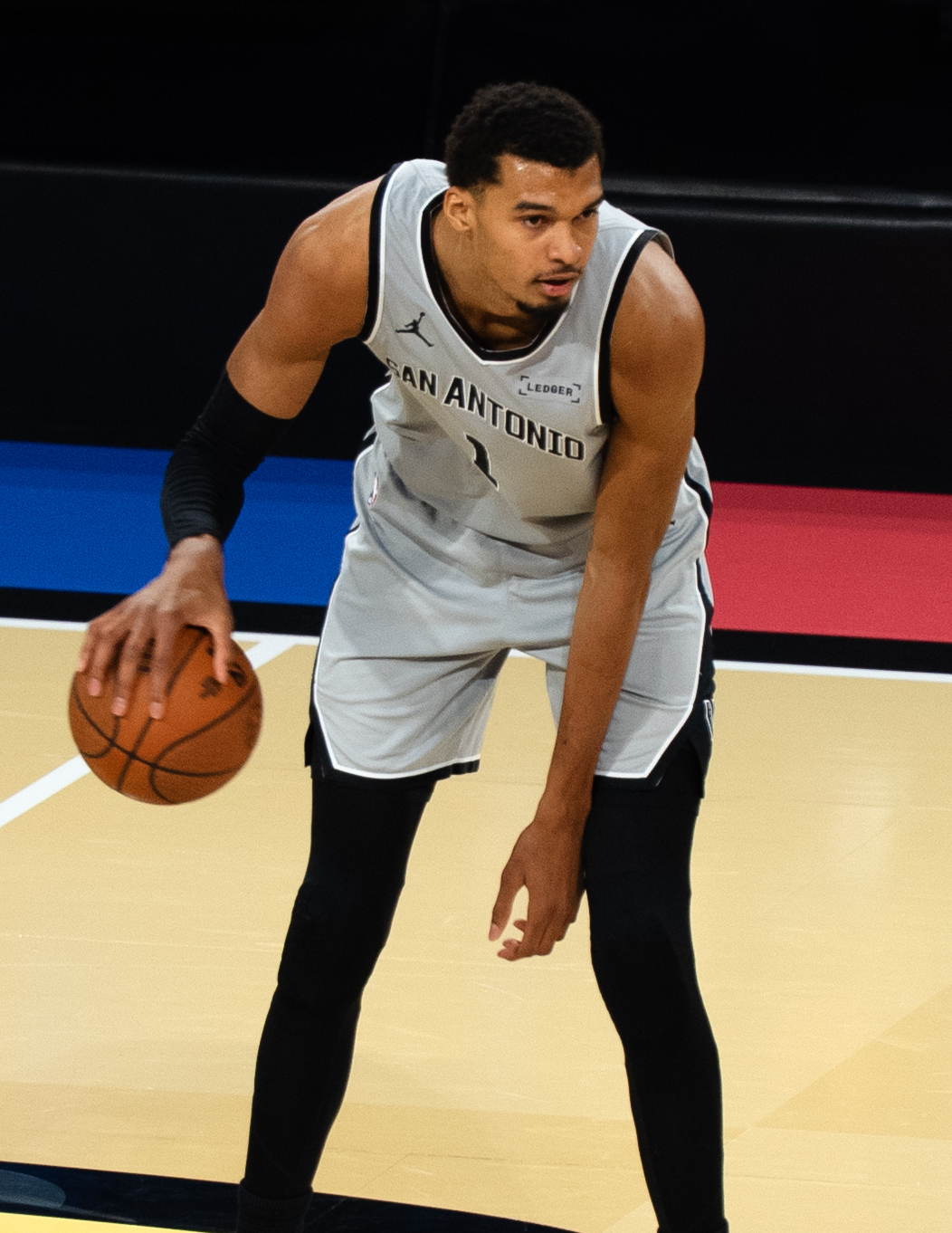
Wembanyama with the San Antonio Spurs in 2025

Before the season, Wembanyama spent ten days studying martial arts at Shaolin Monastery, a Buddhist temple in China where kung fu originated. In his season debut on 22 October 2025, he put up 40 points, 15 rebounds, and three blocks in a 125–92 win over the Dallas Mavericks. His 40 points surpassed George Gervin's previous record (39) for the most points scored in a season-opening game in Spurs franchise history. On 30 October, Wembanyama recorded 27 points, 18 rebounds, six assists, and five blocks to lead the San Antonio Spurs to a 107–101 victory over the Miami Heat. With the win, the Spurs improved to 5–0, marking the best start to a season in franchise history. On 10 November, Wembanyama put up 38 points, 12 rebounds, five assists, five blocks, and six three-pointers made in a 121–117 win over the Chicago Bulls. He became the first player to put up at least 35 points, 10 rebounds, five assists, five blocks, and five three-pointers made in a game in NBA history. On 12 November, Wembanyama recorded his 4th career triple-double with 31 points, 14 rebounds, and 10 assists in the Spurs’ 125–120 loss to the Golden State Warriors. He and Stephon Castle became the first pair of teammates in Spurs history to record triple-doubles in the same game. They also became the fifth duo in NBA history to each produce a 20-point triple-double in a game. On 19 December, Wembanyama put up 26 points, 12 rebounds, and two blocks in a 126–98 win over the Atlanta Hawks. He recorded his 100th consecutive game with at least one block made, joining Dikembe Mutombo and Patrick Ewing as the only players to record a block in at least 100 consecutive games.

On 19 January 2026, Wembanyama was named a Western Conference starter for the 2026 NBA All-Star Game, marking his second consecutive selection and his first as a starter. On 10 February, Wembanyama scored 40 points and collected 12 rebounds in a 136–108 victory over the Los Angeles Lakers. He poured in 37 points in the first half, the highest-scoring half by a Spurs player in the 21st century, and surpassed Tim Duncan in career 40-point games, recording his sixth such performance. Wembanyama also became the third player in the past 50 seasons to score at least 40 points while playing 27 minutes or fewer. On 19 March, Wembanyama scored 34 points, grabbed 12 rebounds and added three steals, including a game‑winning jumper with 1.1 seconds left to lift the Spurs to a 101–100 victory over the Phoenix Suns and clinch the franchise’s first playoff berth since 2019. On 1 April, Wembanyama recorded 41 points, 18 rebounds, and three blocks in a 127–113 win over the Golden State Warriors. At 22 years and 88 days, he became the youngest player to notch back-to-back 40-point, 15-rebound games and the only player in the past 50 years to record consecutive games with at least 40 points, 15 rebounds, and three blocks. He also tallied 27 points and 13 rebounds in the first half, becoming the first Spurs player with at least 25 points and 10 rebounds in any half since play-by-play tracking began in the 1997–98 season. Wembanyama was named the NBA Defensive Player of the Year of the 2025–26 NBA season, becoming the youngest player to ever win it and the first ever player to unanimously win the award in NBA history. He also finished third in the NBA Most Valuable Player Award voting and earned his first All-NBA First Team selection.

On 19 April, Wembanyama made his NBA playoffs debut in Game 1 of the Western Conference First Round against the Portland Trail Blazers, registering 35 points, five rebounds and five three-point field goals made in a 111–98 win, setting a franchise record for the most points scored by a Spurs player in their playoff debut, surpassing the previous record set by Tim Duncan. In Game 2, Wembanyama suffered a concussion after tripping and hitting his head. He was ruled out for Game 3. After beating the Trail Blazers in five games, Wembanyama led the Spurs to their first playoff series win since 2017. He put up 27 points, 12 rebounds and seven blocks in Game 4, followed by 17 points, 14 rebounds and six blocks in Game 5. He became the first player since Patrick Ewing in 1994 to put up consecutive double-doubles with at least six blocks in the playoffs. On 4 May, in Game 1 of the Western Conference Semifinals against the Minnesota Timberwolves, Wembanyama put up a triple-double with 11 points, 15 rebounds, and 12 blocks in a 104–102 loss. His 12 blocks set the record for the most blocks in a playoff game in NBA history, although Wilt Chamberlain is said to have had multiple higher totals before blocks became an officials NBA statistic in 1973, including a 16-block 1969 game. In Game 3, Wembanyama led the Spurs to a 115–108 victory over the Minnesota Timberwolves, posting 39 points, 15 rebounds and five blocks. With the performance, he joined Hakeem Olajuwon, Shaquille O'Neal and Kareem Abdul-Jabbar as the only players in NBA playoff history to record at least 35 points, 15 rebounds and five blocks in a game. Wembanyama reached the milestone in his seventh career playoff game, the fewest playoff games needed to record such a stat line. In Game 4, Wembanyama elbowed Naz Reid in the jaw following an offensive rebound, resulting in a flagrant 2 foul that caused his automatic ejection from the game. It was the first ejection of his career. He finished with four points and four rebounds in 13 minutes played.

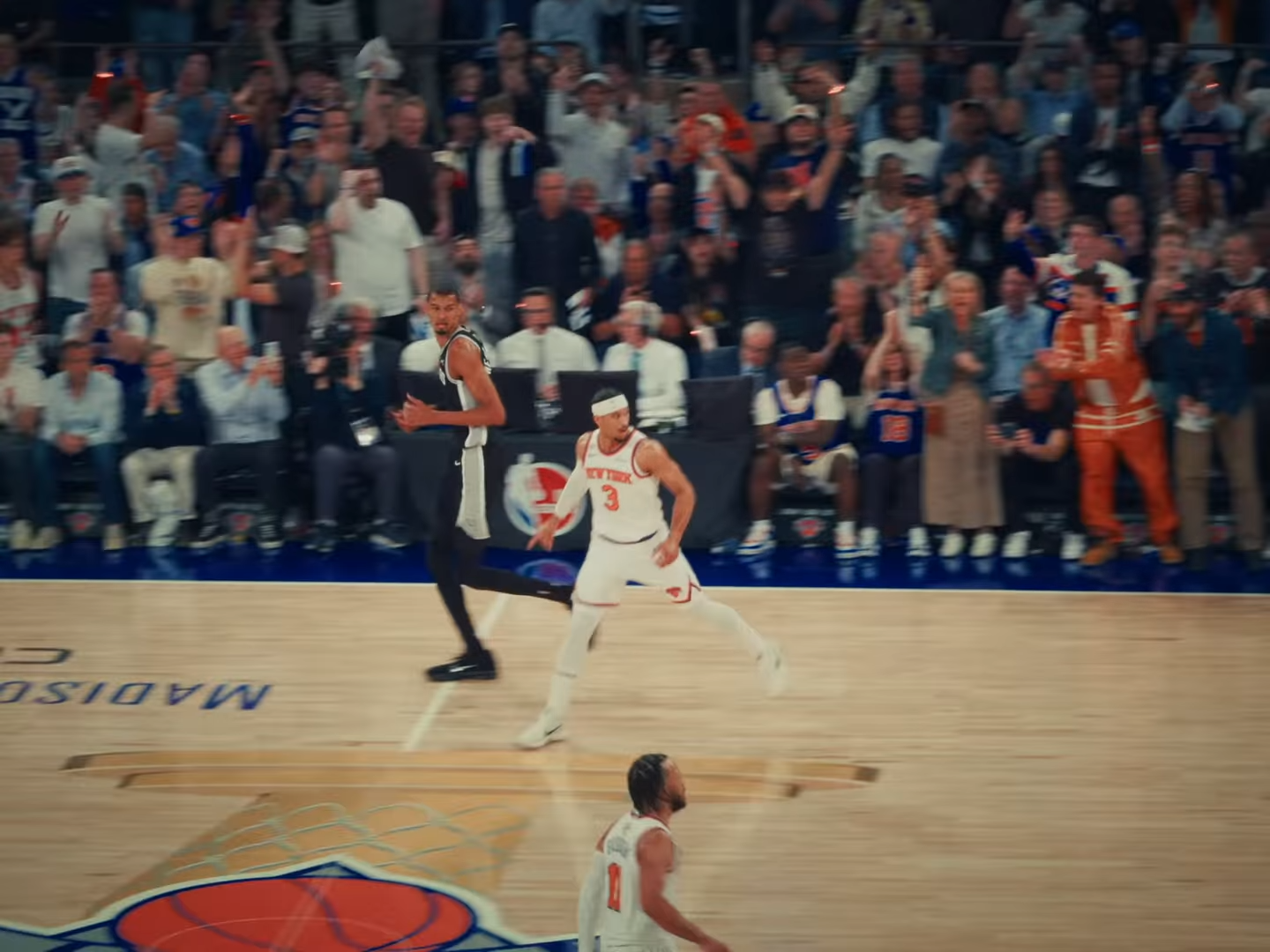
Wembanyama in Game 3 of the 2026 NBA Finals

On 18 May, in Game 1 of the Western Conference Finals against the Oklahoma City Thunder, Wembanyama recorded 41 points and 24 rebounds, along with three assists and three blocks, leading the Spurs to a 122–115 double-overtime win. At 22 years and 134 days old, he surpassed Kareem Abdul-Jabbar (46 points, 25 rebounds in Game 5 against the 76ers in 1970) as the youngest player in NBA history to record at least 40 points and 20 rebounds in a playoff game. On 30 May, in Game 7, the Spurs defeated the Thunder 111–103 to advance to the NBA Finals. In the game, Wembanyama recorded 22 points, seven rebounds, and five assists despite committing five fouls. Following the series, Wembanyama was named Western Conference Finals MVP after averaging 27.3 points, 10.9 rebounds, 3.1 assists, 1.4 steals, and 2.7 blocks on 48 percent shooting from the field and 40 percent from three-point range in seven games. The victory marked the Spurs’ first NBA Finals appearance since 2014.

Entering the 2026 NBA Finals down 0–2 to the New York Knicks, the Spurs won Game 3 by a score of 115–111, snapping the Knicks' 13-game winning streak. Wembanyama posted 32 points, eight rebounds, six assists, two steals, and three blocks while committing just one turnover. The performance made him the second-youngest player in NBA history to record at least 30 points and five assists in an NBA Finals game, behind only Magic Johnson and ahead of Kobe Bryant. Entering Game 4, Wembanyama posted a double double, where he generated 24 points, 12 rebounds, and one assist in 44 minutes of game-time. During the game, he also tallied up a flagrant foul after aggressively hitting Karl Anthony Towns. This also marked as a negative, yet historic game for the Spurs as the team blew a 29-point lead against the Knicks and allowed them to come back to win the game 107–106. In Game 5, Wembanyama recorded 19 points, 14 rebounds and five blocks as the Spurs fell 94–90 to the Knicks, losing the series 4–1. In his first NBA Finals appearance, He averaged 26 points, 11.2 rebounds, 2.6 assists, 1 steal, and 3.6 blocks across the five-game series. Wembanyama finished the playoffs with 78 blocked shots, the third-highest total in a single postseason in NBA history, behind only Hakeem Olajuwon (92 in 1994) and Tim Duncan (79 in 2003).

On 24 July 2026, it was revealed that Wembanyama will be featured on the cover of the September 2026 video game NBA 2K27.

==== 2026–27 season ====
On 4 November 2026, Wembanyama recorded a career-high 52 points and a career-high 24 rebounds, along with eight blocks in a 112–111 win over the Dallas Mavericks. He also became the first player since Bob McAdoo in 1974 to record a stat-line of at least 50 points, 20 rebounds, and five blocks in a game in NBA history. His first-half stat-line of 29 points, 15 rebounds, and five blocks also led him to become the first player in NBA history to put up at least 25 points, 10 rebounds, and five blocks in a half since the play-by-play era. His 15 first half free throws without a miss ties James Harden for the play-by-play era (since 1997–98) record. On 9 November, Wembanyama posted 40 points, 11 rebounds, and nine blocks in just 25 minutes, shooting 15-of-19 from the field, in a 122–96 win over the Phoenix Suns. He became the third player since the 1973–74 season, alongside Kareem Abdul-Jabbar and David Robinson, to record multiple games with at least 40 points, 10 rebounds, and eight blocks. He also tied Stephen Curry for the most career games with at least 40 points in fewer than 30 minutes played, with five. On November 21, Wembanyama had 50 points, 18 rebounds, five blocks, four steals, and five three-pointers in a 114–91 victory over the New Orleans Pelicans. He became the first player in NBA history to record at least 50 points, five blocks, and five three-pointers in a single game, as well as the first to register at least 50 points, 15 rebounds, four steals, and five blocks since steals and blocks became officially recorded statistics in 1973–74.

== National team career ==
=== Junior national team ===
Wembanyama represented France at the 2019 FIBA U16 European Championship in Udine, Italy. In an 80–78 quarterfinal win over Croatia, he recorded 12 points, 21 rebounds and eight blocks. He averaged nine points, 9.6 rebounds and a tournament-leading 5.3 blocks per game, leading France to a silver medal and earning all-tournament team honours.

He then competed at the 2021 FIBA Under-19 Basketball World Cup in Latvia. Wembanyama averaged 14 points, 7.4 rebounds and 5.7 blocks per game, and was named to the all-tournament team after leading France to the silver medal. He recorded 22 points, eight rebounds and eight blocks in an 83–81 loss to the United States in the final. Wembanyama set the FIBA record for blocks per game in a single tournament.

=== Senior national team ===
Wembanyama was on the preliminary 17-player roster of the French national team for EuroBasket 2022, but was ruled out a month ahead, due to an injury he suffered at the end of the 2021–22 season. He was selected again for the World Cup qualifiers in November. In his debut with the senior team, on 11 November 2022, he scored 20 points and grabbed nine rebounds in a 90–65 win over Lithuania.

==== 2024 Summer Olympics ====
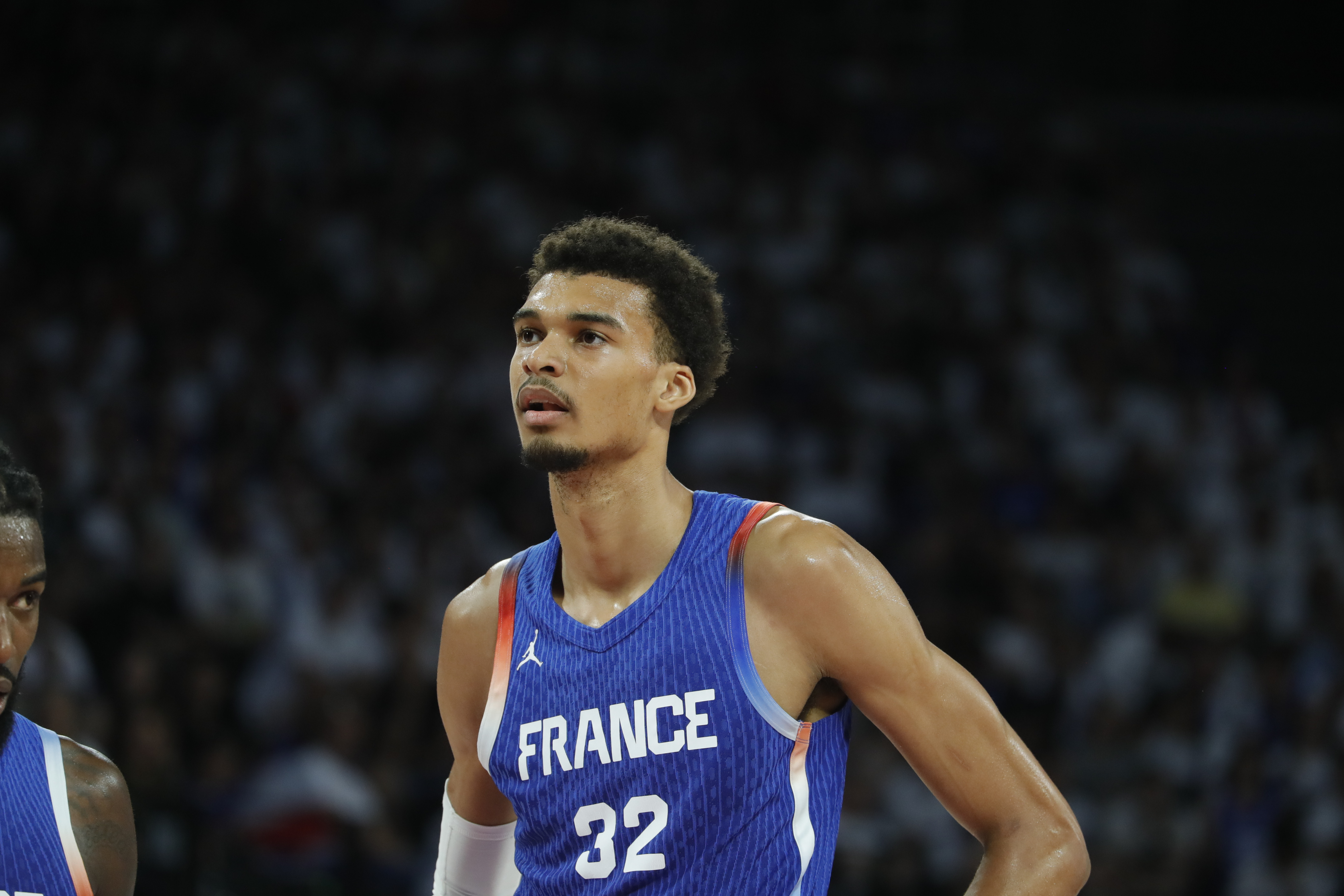
Wembanyama with France in 2024

Wembanyama was selected for France to play at the 2024 Summer Olympics, which were held in his native Paris. He had 19 points and 9 rebounds in his Olympic debut in a win against Brazil. Wembanyama helped France reach its second consecutive final, following a quarterfinal win over Canada and semifinal win over Germany, in which they faced the United States. In the final, Wembanyama scored a team-high 26 points, however, the United States pulled away late in the fourth quarter which left France with a silver medal. After the final, Wembanyama was named the tournament's Rising Star, as well as a member of the All-Star Five, following his averages of 15.8 points, 9.7 rebounds, 3.3 assists, 2 blocks and 1.7 steals per game.

== Player profile ==
"Everybody has been a unicorn over the last few years, but he's more like an alien. No one has ever seen anyone as tall as he is but as fluid and as graceful as he is out on the floor. At (his size), his ability to put the ball on the floor, shoot step-back jumpers out of the post, step-back threes, catch-and-shoot threes and block shots. He's for sure a generational talent."

— LeBron James on Wembanyama in October 2022, after his debut in the United States against the NBA G League Ignite

By 2022, Wembanyama was widely regarded as one of the greatest NBA prospects in a generation; many publications called him the most anticipated newcomer to the league since LeBron James in 2003. He emerged as one of Europe's top prospects at age 14 and was viewed by analysts as a potential first overall pick in his draft class by age 16. During his final season before becoming eligible for the 2023 NBA draft, he was the consensus number-one pick in draft projections. NBA commissioner Adam Silver said the league would pay "particular attention" to tanking for the 2023 draft, due to the possibility of acquiring a "once-in-a-generation player" in the draft.

Measured at 7 feet 3 1/2 inches (2.22 m) in June 2023 and having grown since, with an estimated 8-foot (2.4 m) wingspan, Wembanyama entered the NBA as one of the league's tallest players, although his height has raised questions about his durability. He often plays on the perimeter and has exceptional mobility and skills for his size, with the ability to handle and shoot the ball like a guard. Wembanyama is a capable three-point shooter and his jump shot is difficult to block because of his length. He is a productive scorer in the paint, with soft touch, a variety of post moves, and excels in the pick and roll. Defensively, he is an outstanding shot-blocker due to his length and anticipation, and his fluidity allows him to guard smaller players. His thin frame and lack of strength have been labelled as weaknesses and encourage opponents to use a physical style of play against him. For this reason, he can struggle to box out while rebounding and to defend post-ups.

Although some analysts have noted the unprecedented nature of his game, others have compared Wembanyama to Wilt Chamberlain and Kareem Abdul-Jabbar. ESPN draft analyst Mike Schmitz compared his defensive impact to Rudy Gobert and his shooting potential to Kristaps Porziņģis, albeit with better ball-handling and passing skills. John Hollinger of The Athletic described his game as a combination of Ralph Sampson, Porziņģis, and Dirk Nowitzki. Wembanyama models parts of his game after Kevin Durant (his idol growing up) and Giannis Antetokounmpo.

== Awards and honors ==
NBA

- 2× NBA All-Star: 2025, 2026
- All-NBA First Team: 2026
- NBA Defensive Player of the Year: 2026
- 2× NBA All-Defensive First Team: 2024, 2026
- NBA Rookie of the Year: 2024
- NBA All-Rookie First Team: 2024
- 3× NBA blocks leader: 2024–2026
- NBA Western Conference finals MVP: 2026
- Magic Johnson Award: 2026

LNB Élite

- LNB Élite champion: 2022
- LNB Élite MVP: 2023
- All-LNB Élite First Team: 2023
- LNB Élite Best Scorer: 2023
- LNB Élite Best Defender: 2023
- LNB Élite Best Blocker: 2023
- LNB Élite All-Star Game MVP: 2022
- 2× LNB Élite All-Star: 2021, 2022
- 3× LNB Élite Best Young Player: 2021–2023

French Basketball

- Olympics silver medalist: 2024
- Olympics All-Star Five: 2024
- Olympics Rising Star: 2024
- French Player of the Year: 2023
- FIBA Under-19 World Cup silver medalist: 2021
- FIBA Under-19 Basketball World Cup All-Tournament Team: 2021
- FIBA U16 European Championship silver medalist: 2019
- FIBA U16 European Championship All-Tournament Team: 2019

Orders

- Chevalier in the French Order of Merit: 2024

== Career statistics ==
Legend
GP	Games played	GS	Games started	MPG	Minutes per game
FG%	Field goal percentage	3P%	3-point field goal percentage	FT%	Free throw percentage
RPG	Rebounds per game	APG	Assists per game	SPG	Steals per game
BPG	Blocks per game	PPG	Points per game	**Bold**	Career high
*	Led the league

=== NBA ===
==== Regular season ====
Year	Team	GP	GS	MPG	FG%	3P%	FT%	RPG	APG	SPG	BPG	PPG
2023–24	San Antonio	**71**	**71**	29.7	.465	.325	.796	10.6	**3.9**	**1.2**	3.6*	21.4
2024–25	San Antonio	46	46	**33.2**	.476	**.352**	**.836**	11.0	3.7	1.1	**3.8***	24.3
2025–26	San Antonio	64	55	29.2	**.512**	.349	.827	**11.5**	3.1	1.0	3.1*	**25.0**
Career		181	172	30.4	.484	.342	.817	11.0	3.5	1.1	3.5	23.4
All-Star		2	1	16.9	.750	.625	1.000	7.5	.0	.5	2.5	25.0

==== Playoffs ====
Year	Team	GP	GS	MPG	FG%	3P%	FT%	RPG	APG	SPG	BPG	PPG
2026	San Antonio	22	22	34.1	.485	.342	.847	10.9	2.7	1.0	3.5	23.8
Career		22	22	34.1	.485	.342	.847	10.9	2.7	1.0	3.5	23.8

=== EuroLeague ===
Victor Wembanyama EuroLeague statistics
Year	Team	GP	GS	MPG	FG%	3P%	FT%	RPG	APG	SPG	BPG	PPG	PIR
2021–22	ASVEL	13	10	17.5	.348	.303	.667	3.8	.5	.4	1.9	6.5	5.5
Career		13	10	17.5	.348	.303	.667	3.8	.5	.4	1.9	6.5	5.5

=== LNB Élite ===
Cited from LNB.FR

	Denotes season in which Wembanyama won the LNB Élite
*	Led the league

==== Regular season ====
Year	Team	GP	GS	MPG	FG%	3P%	FT%	RPG	APG	SPG	BPG	PPG
2020–21	Nanterre 92	18	10	16.9	.500	**.364**	.684	4.7	0.8	0.2	1.9	6.8
2021–22	ASVEL	16	10	18.5	**.605**	.260	.700	5.1	0.8	0.9	1.8	9.4
2022–23	Metropolitans 92	**34**	**34**	**32.1**	.561	.275	**.828**	**10.4***	**2.4**	**0.9**	**3.0***	**21.6***
Career		68	54	24.3	.559	.283	.792	7.3	1.6	0.7	2.5	14.3
All-Star		1	1	27.5	.688	.111	1.000	12.0	4.0	3.0	2.0	27.0

==== Playoffs ====
Year	Team	GP	GS	MPG	FG%	3P%	FT%	RPG	APG	SPG	BPG	PPG
2021–22	ASVEL	4	1	13.2	.429	**.250**	.667	1.8	0.3	0.3	1.0	3.5
2022–23	Metropolitans 92	**10**	**10**	**32.4**	**.523**	**.250**	**.809**	**9.2**	**2.7**	**1.0**	**2.7***	**17.3**
Career		14	11	26.9	.510	.250	.796	7.0	2.0	0.8	2.4	13.3

== Personal life ==
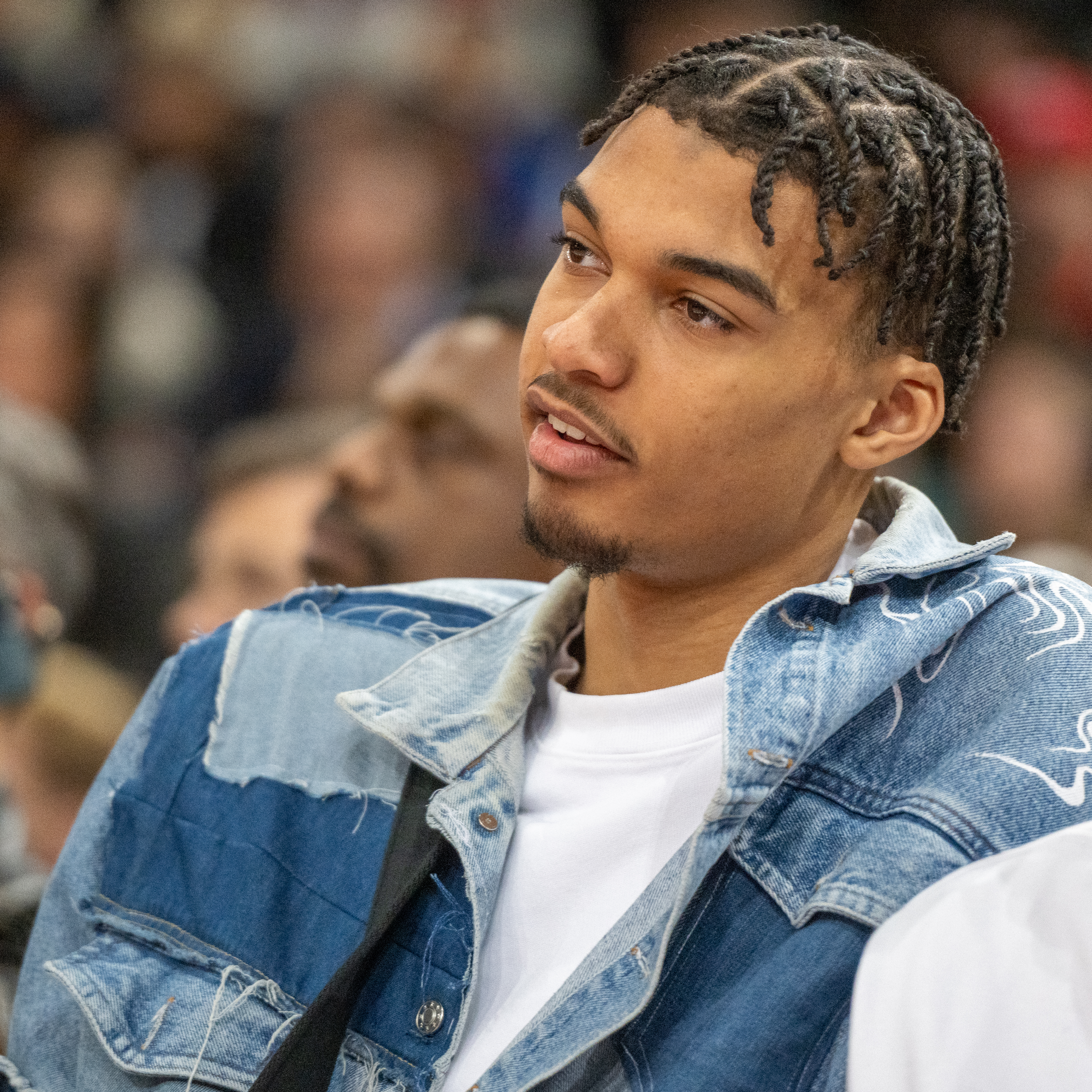
Wembanyama sitting courtside at an NBA game in Paris in 2023

Wembanyama is represented by agent Bouna Ndiaye of Comsport. His family has a longtime relationship with Ndiaye, whose son was coached by Wembanyama's mother from an early age. Ndiaye has advised Wembanyama since he was 15 years old, then signed him as a client in 2022.

Wembanyama was a year ahead for his age in school and attended lycée in agreement with Nanterre 92. He earned his baccalauréat with honours, specialising in earth and life sciences and social and economic sciences. Besides his native French, he speaks English fluently, having taught himself beginning in middle school by watching videos from American accounts on Instagram and English-language television shows. He enjoys science fiction, Star Wars, art, and literature. His favourite musical artist is the rapper Alpha Wann.

During the 2023 Las Vegas NBA Summer League, Wembanyama and his personal security team were involved in an 'incident' with pop singer Britney Spears. Spears had approached Wembanyama in Vegas and tapped him on the back, leading to Wembanyama's security striking Spears in the face; no charges were filed after the incident.

The jersey that Wembanyama wore in his debut game was sold by Sotheby's for a record price for newcomers of $762,000.

Wembanyama is an avid chess player and has played with fans in Washington Square Park, in New York City. In summer 2025, he organized a Hoop Gambit chess tournament, which also included basketball competitions, in his hometown, Le Chesnay.

In June 2025, Wembanyama participated in a 10-day retreat at the Shaolin Temple in Zhengzhou, China for a closed-door martial arts training in Shaolin kung fu. He was seen with the traditional shaved head hairstyle along with the traditional monk robe. He also learned Buddhist meditation from the monks, but has stated that he is not personally a believer in Buddhism.

In July 2026, The New York Times listed Wembanyama as one of the 39-ish most stylish people of 2026.

== Sponsorships ==
Wembanyama has secured several high-profile sponsorship deals including partnerships with Nike, 2K, Fanatics, Barcode, and Louis Vuitton. In July 2023, he became a brand ambassador for the sports drink brand Barcode. While Wembanyama does not have his own signature sneaker, he helped design his own player exclusive version of the Nike GT Hustle 2, called "The Alien", inspired by his nickname.

== See also ==
- List of first overall NBA draft picks
- List of tallest players in NBA history
- List of NBA annual blocks leaders
- List of NBA single-game blocks leaders
- List of NBA single-season blocks per game leaders
