= Boardroom (company) =

American media network

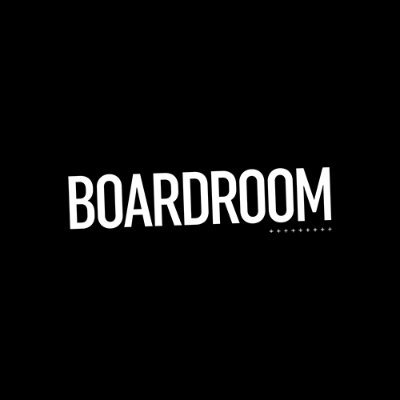
- Founded: 2019; 6 years ago
- Founders: Kevin Durant; Rich Kleiman
- Headquarters: United States
- Area served: Worldwide
- Number of employees: 25 (2022)
- Website: boardroom.tv

Boardroom is an American media network for sports, business and entertainment. It was founded in 2019 by Kevin Durant and Rich Kleiman.

== History ==
On September 24, 2018, ESPN and Durant announced plans for The Boardroom, a six-episode series hosted by Rich Kleiman and Jay Williams. The show premiered on February 11, 2019, with guests including LeBron James, P. J. Tucker, Maverick Carter, Andre Iguodala, Jack Dorsey, CJ McCollum, and Breanna Stewart.

Boardroom became a standalone media network in 2019 and expanded during the coronavirus pandemic, which Kleiman told Forbes was a "pivotal moment" for the company. A second season of "The Boardroom" premiered on ESPN+ on February 12, 2020. Later that year, Boardroom announced the launch of two podcasts, "Out of Office with Rich Kleiman" and "The ETCs with Kevin Durant".

Gary Vaynerchuk became the first Boardroom cover story in May 2022 in an article titled "What's Next for Gary Vee?". As of that June, The Athletic reported that Boardroom was a 25-person company with digital news media, podcasts, video and social content. The company later launched the HeadlineToGo newsletter as a morning rundown of business news in sports, entertainment and tech. It was recognized with a Webby Award for Websites and Mobile Sites: Entertainment & Culture and was a finalist for "Best Newsletter" by Digiday.

The company announced Boardroom Advisory, a firm that works with athletes, executives and brands to create business and media connections, in September 2023. Nike released the KD 16 in a "Boardroom" colorway featuring the brand's monochromatic iconography in October 2023. Boardroom began expanding its affiliated events including conferences, curated conversations and VIP sporting parties which tripled the company's events revenue within a year. The company received "Most Innovative Brand" in the 2024 Digiday Awards.

It launched Chapter:Next, a professional athlete and management development program, along with Fanatics in February 2025. The first edition of the event was announced for June 2025 as a networking room for athletes and entertainers. In March 2025, the company detailed plans for Boardroom Members Club for in-person networking of people in industries such as sports, media and finance. Its advisors include Michael Strahan, Mark Ronson, Mike Levine and Taylor Rooks. Participants in Chapter:Next receive complimentary access to Boardroom Members Club.

== Partnerships ==
In partnership with Showtime, Boardroom produced a documentary, NYC Point Gods, that premiered on July 29, 2022. It was nominated for Outstanding Long Documentary at the 44th Sports Emmy Awards. Boardroom also co-produced Swagger along with Imagine Entertainment, CBS Studios and Undisputed Cinema.

Boardroom announced a partnership with Major League Baseball (MLB) to begin relationship-building and networking for its players in 2023. The company also has partnerships with brands such as Weedmaps, Coinbase, FanDuel and CNBC, among others.
