= Kevin Durant =

American basketball player (born 1988)

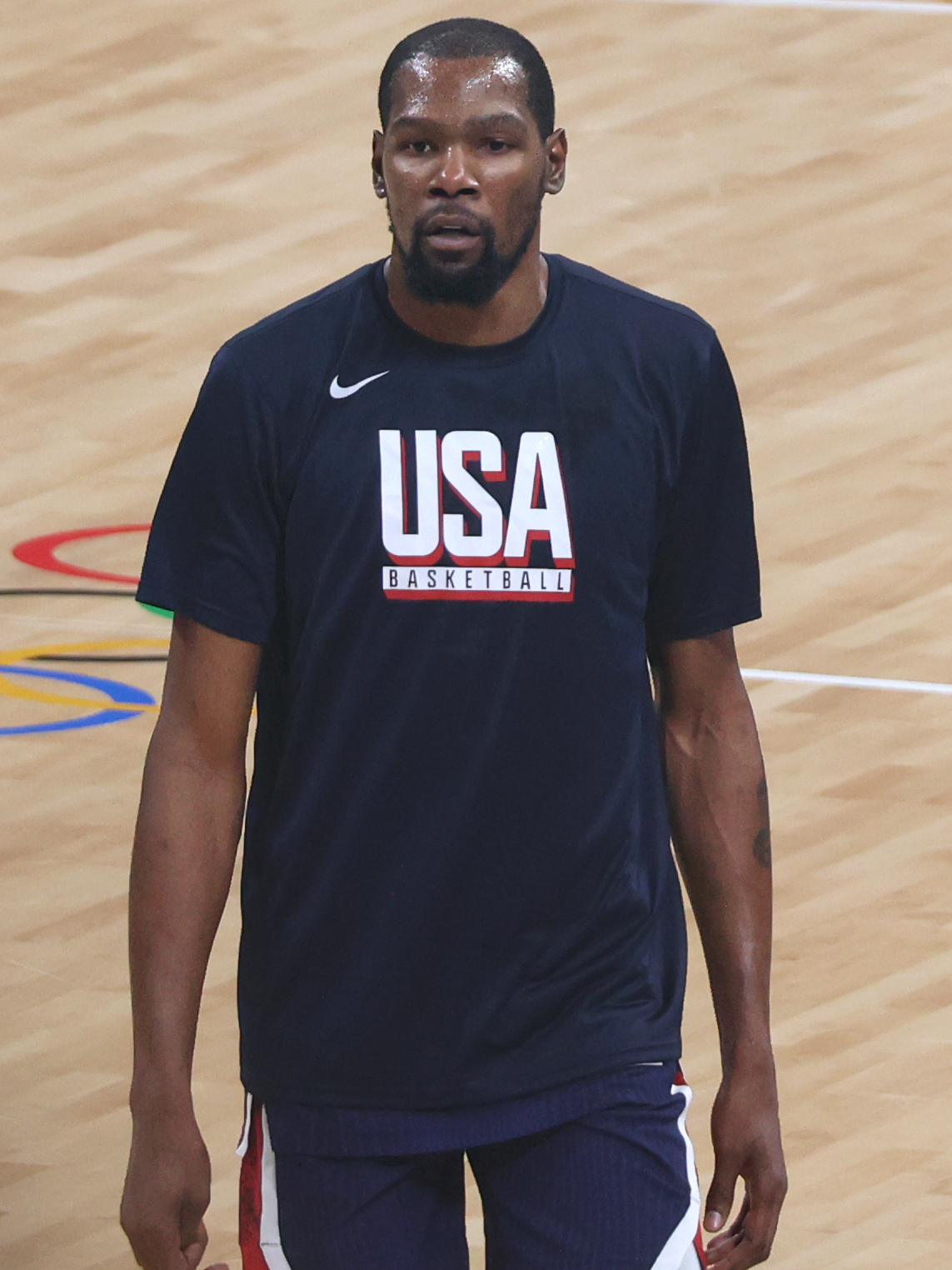
- Durant with the 2024 U.S. Olympic team

No. 7 – Houston Rockets
- Position: Small forward / power forward
- League: NBA

Personal information
- Born: September 29, 1988 (age 38) Washington, D.C., U.S.
- Listed height: 6 ft 11 in (2.11 m)
- Listed weight: 234 lb (106 kg)

Career information
- High school: National Christian Academy (Fort Washington, Maryland); Oak Hill Academy (Mouth of Wilson, Virginia); Montrose Christian School (Rockville, Maryland)
- College: Texas (2006–2007)
- NBA draft: 2007: 1st round, 2nd overall pick
- Drafted by: Seattle SuperSonics
- Playing career: 2007–present

Career history
- 2007–2016: Seattle SuperSonics / Oklahoma City Thunder
- 2016–2019: Golden State Warriors
- 2019–2023: Brooklyn Nets
- 2023–2025: Phoenix Suns
- 2025–present: Houston Rockets

Career highlights
- 2× NBA champion (2017, 2018); 2× NBA Finals MVP (2017, 2018); NBA Most Valuable Player (2014); 16× NBA All-Star (2010–2019, 2021–2026); 2× NBA All-Star Game MVP (2012, 2019); 6× All-NBA First Team (2010–2014, 2018); 6× All-NBA Second Team (2016, 2017, 2019, 2022, 2024, 2026); NBA Rookie of the Year (2008); NBA All-Rookie First Team (2008); 4× NBA scoring champion (2010–2012, 2014); NBA 75th Anniversary Team; National college player of the year (2007); Consensus first-team All-American (2007); USBWA National Freshman of the Year (2007); Big 12 Player of the Year (2007); No. 35 retired by Texas Longhorns; Olympics MVP (2020); FIBA World Cup MVP (2010); 3× USA Basketball Male Athlete of the Year (2010, 2016, 2021); McDonald's All-American Game Co-MVP (2006); First-team Parade All-American (2006); Second-team Parade All-American (2005)
- Stats at NBA.com
- Stats at Basketball Reference
Medals
Men's basketball
Representing the United States
Olympic Games
Gold medal – first place	2012 London	Team
Gold medal – first place	2016 Rio de Janeiro	Team
Gold medal – first place	2020 Tokyo	Team
Gold medal – first place	2024 Paris	Team
World Championship/World Cup
Gold medal – first place	2010 Turkey	Team

Kevin Wayne Durant (born September 29, 1988), also known by his initials KD, is an American professional basketball player for the Houston Rockets of the National Basketball Association (NBA). Nicknamed "the Slim Reaper", he is widely regarded as one of the greatest basketball players and one of the greatest scorers of all time. Durant has won two NBA championships, an NBA Most Valuable Player Award, two NBA Finals Most Valuable Player Awards, two NBA All-Star Game Most Valuable Player Awards, four NBA scoring titles, the NBA Rookie of the Year Award, and is the only male basketball player to win four Olympic gold medals. He has been named to 12 All-NBA teams (including six First Teams) and selected 16 times as an NBA All-Star. In 2021, Durant was named to the NBA 75th Anniversary Team. He ranks fifth among NBA career scoring leaders. He was the youngest entrant to the NBA 50–40–90 club.

Durant was heavily recruited in high school. He played one season of college basketball for the Texas Longhorns, during which he won numerous year-end awards and became the first freshman to be named Naismith College Player of the Year. Durant was selected as the second overall pick by the Seattle SuperSonics in the 2007 NBA draft. He played nine seasons with the franchise (which became the Oklahoma City Thunder in 2008), leading them to a Finals appearance in 2012 and winning the MVP award for the 2013–2014 season. In a controversial move, he later signed with the Golden State Warriors in 2016, who had won a record 73 regular season games the previous year. Durant won consecutive NBA championships and Finals MVPs in 2017 and 2018. After sustaining an Achilles injury in the 2019 NBA Finals, he joined the Brooklyn Nets as a free agent that summer. After disagreements with the Nets' front office, he requested a trade during the 2022 offseason and was traded to the Phoenix Suns the following year. After two full seasons with Phoenix, Durant was traded to the Houston Rockets in July 2025.

As a member of the U.S. national team, Durant has won four gold medals in the Olympics (2012, 2016, 2020 and 2024), and is the leading scorer in Team USA's Olympic basketball history. In 2024, he became the first male athlete to win four Olympics gold medals in a team sport. He also won gold at the 2010 FIBA World Championship.

Off the court, Durant is one of the highest-earning basketball players in the world, due in part to an endorsement deal with Nike that he signed in 2007; the partnership has continued for 19 years. He was named one of Time's 100 most influential people in the world in 2018 and has been listed by Forbes as one of the world's ten highest-paid athletes ten times.

== Early life ==
Durant was born on September 29, 1988, in Washington, D.C., to Wanda (née Durant) and Wayne Pratt. When Durant was an infant, his father deserted the family; Wanda and Wayne eventually divorced, and Durant's grandmother, Barbara Davis, helped raise him. By age 13, Durant's father reentered his life and traveled the country with him to basketball tournaments. Durant has a sister, Brianna, and two brothers, Tony and Rayvonne.

Durant and his siblings grew up in Prince George's County, Maryland, on the eastern outskirts of Washington, D.C. He was unusually tall from a young age, and reached 6 ft 0 in (1.83 m) in height while still in middle school (age 10–12). Growing up, Durant wanted to play for his favorite team, the Toronto Raptors, which included his favorite player, Vince Carter. Durant played Amateur Athletic Union (AAU) basketball for several teams in the Maryland area and was teammates with future NBA players Michael Beasley, Greivis Vásquez, and Ty Lawson, the first of whom Durant remains friends with to this day. During this time, he began wearing #35 as his jersey number in honor of his AAU coach, Charles Craig, who was murdered at the age of 35.

After playing two years of high school basketball at National Christian Academy and one year at Oak Hill Academy, Durant transferred to Montrose Christian School for his senior year, growing 5 inches (13 cm) before the start of the season and beginning the year at 6 ft 7 in (2.01 m).

Before the season, Durant committed to the University of Texas at Austin. He had visited University of Connecticut, and University of North Carolina, and said that he considered Duke University, University of Kentucky, and University of Louisville. When Durant was asked why he chose a college with a lesser-known program, he said, "Wanted to set my own path."

At the end of the year, Durant was named the Washington Post All-Met Basketball Player of the Year, as well as the Most Valuable Player of the 2006 McDonald's All-American Game. He was widely regarded as the second-best high school prospect of 2006, behind Greg Oden.

Durant had stated that he would have declared for the 2006 NBA draft if the NBA had not introduced the one-and-done rule, where his favorite team growing up, the Toronto Raptors, had the first overall pick.

== College career ==
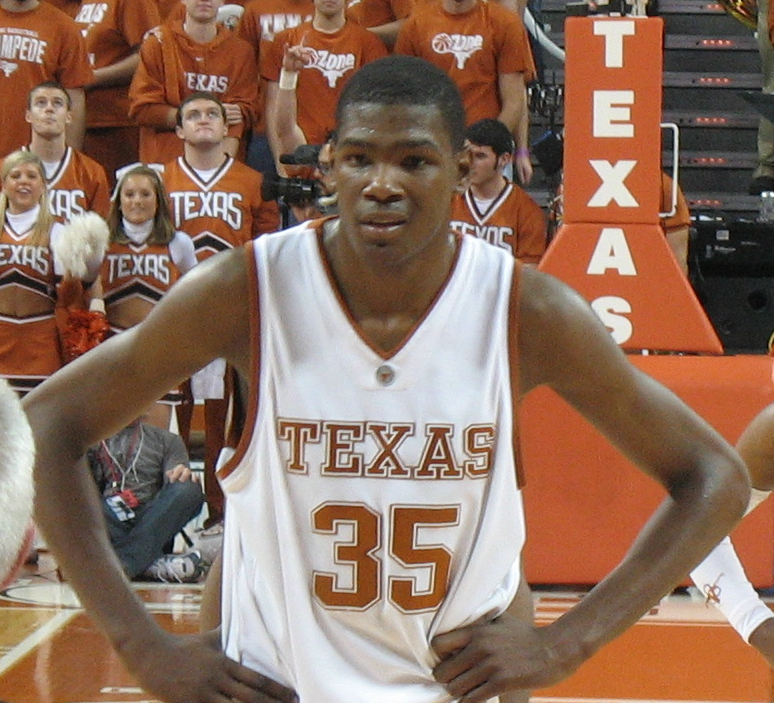
Durant with the Texas Longhorns in 2007

For the 2006–07 college season, Durant—who had grown to 6 ft 9 in (2.06 m)—averaged 25.8 points, 11.1 rebounds, and 1.3 assists per game for the Texas Longhorns. Texas finished the season with a 25–10 record overall and a 12–4 record in conference. Awarded a #4 seed in the NCAA Tournament, Texas won its first round match-up against New Mexico State but was upset in the second round by USC despite a 30-point and 9-rebound performance from Durant. For his outstanding play, Durant was recognized as the unanimous national player of the year, winning the John R. Wooden Award, the Naismith College Player of the Year Award, and all eight other widely recognized honors and awards. This made Durant the first freshman to win any of the national player of the year awards. After the season, he declared for the NBA draft. Durant's No. 35 jersey was later retired by the Longhorns.

== Professional career ==
=== Seattle SuperSonics / Oklahoma City Thunder (2007–2016) ===
==== Rookie of the Year (2007–2008) ====
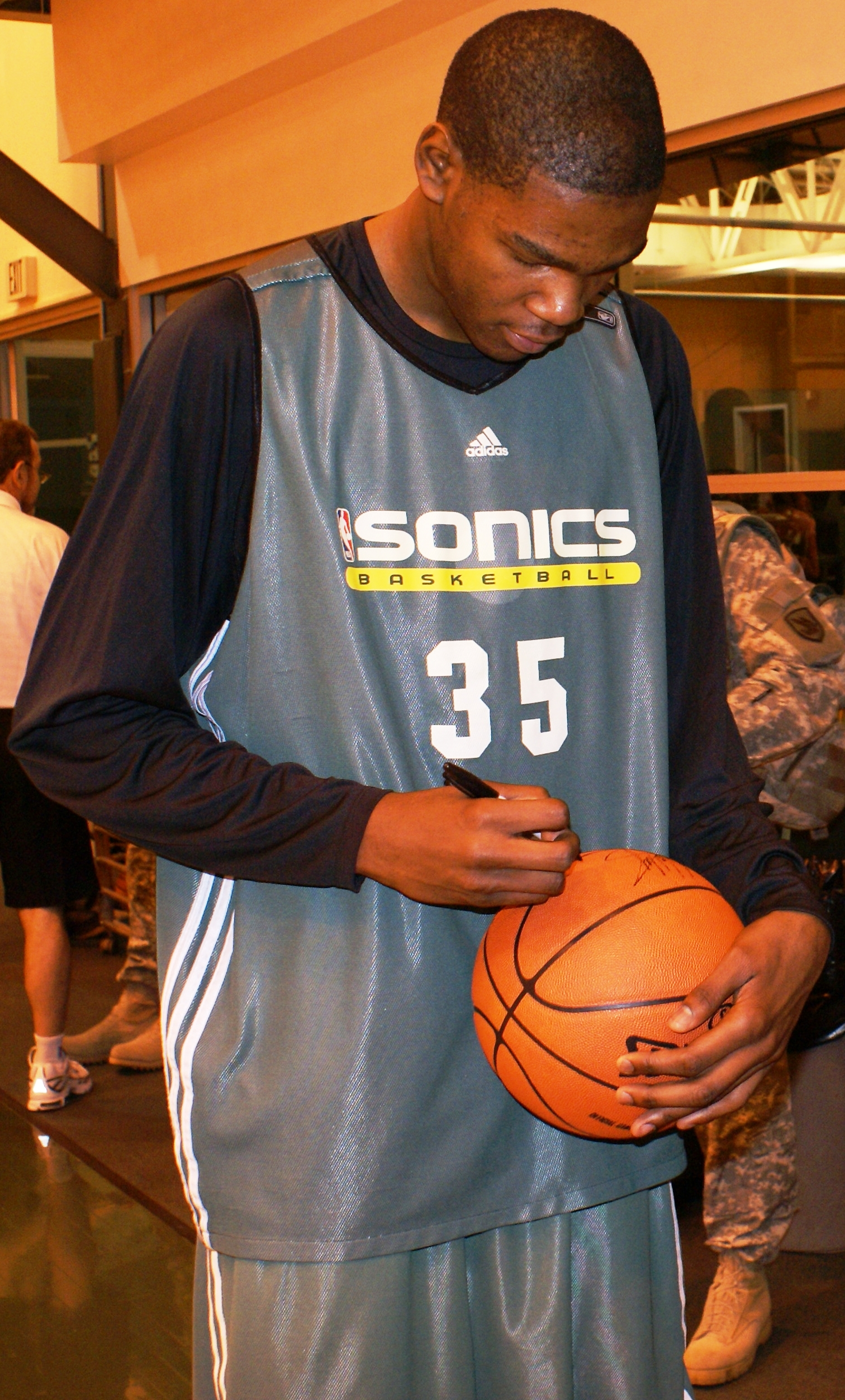
Durant in 2008

Durant was selected as the second overall pick in the 2007 NBA draft by the Seattle SuperSonics, after Greg Oden was selected by the Portland Trail Blazers with the first pick of the draft. In his first regular season game, the 19-year-old Durant registered 18 points, five rebounds, and three steals against the Denver Nuggets. On November 16, he made the first game-winning shot of his career in a game against the Atlanta Hawks.

At the end of the 2007–08 NBA season, Durant was named the NBA Rookie of the Year following averages of 20.3 points, 4.4 rebounds and 2.4 assists per game. He joined Carmelo Anthony and LeBron James as the only teenagers in league history to average at least 20 points per game over an entire season.

==== Breakthrough (2008–2010) ====
Following Durant's rookie season, the Supersonics moved to Oklahoma City, becoming the Thunder and switching to new colors – blue, orange, and yellow. The team also drafted UCLA guard Russell Westbrook, who would form an All-Star combination with Durant in later years. At the 2009 NBA All-Star Weekend, he set a Rookie Challenge record with 46 points. By the end of the 2008–09 NBA season, Durant had raised his scoring average to 25.3 points per game, five points more than the previous season, and was considered a strong candidate for the Most Improved Player Award, eventually finishing third in the voting. Durant continued to grow during his first few years in the NBA, finally reaching a height of 6 ft 11 in (2.11 m).

During the 2009–10 season, Durant was selected to his first NBA All-Star Game. Behind his play, the Thunder improved their record by 27 wins from the previous year and defied expectations to make the playoffs. With a scoring average of 30.1 points per game, Durant became the youngest NBA scoring champion and was selected to his first All-NBA team. In his playoff debut, Durant scored 24 points in a Game 1 loss to the Los Angeles Lakers. Oklahoma City lost the series in six games, but the team's performance led many analysts to label them as an upcoming title contender.

==== First NBA finals (2010–2012) ====
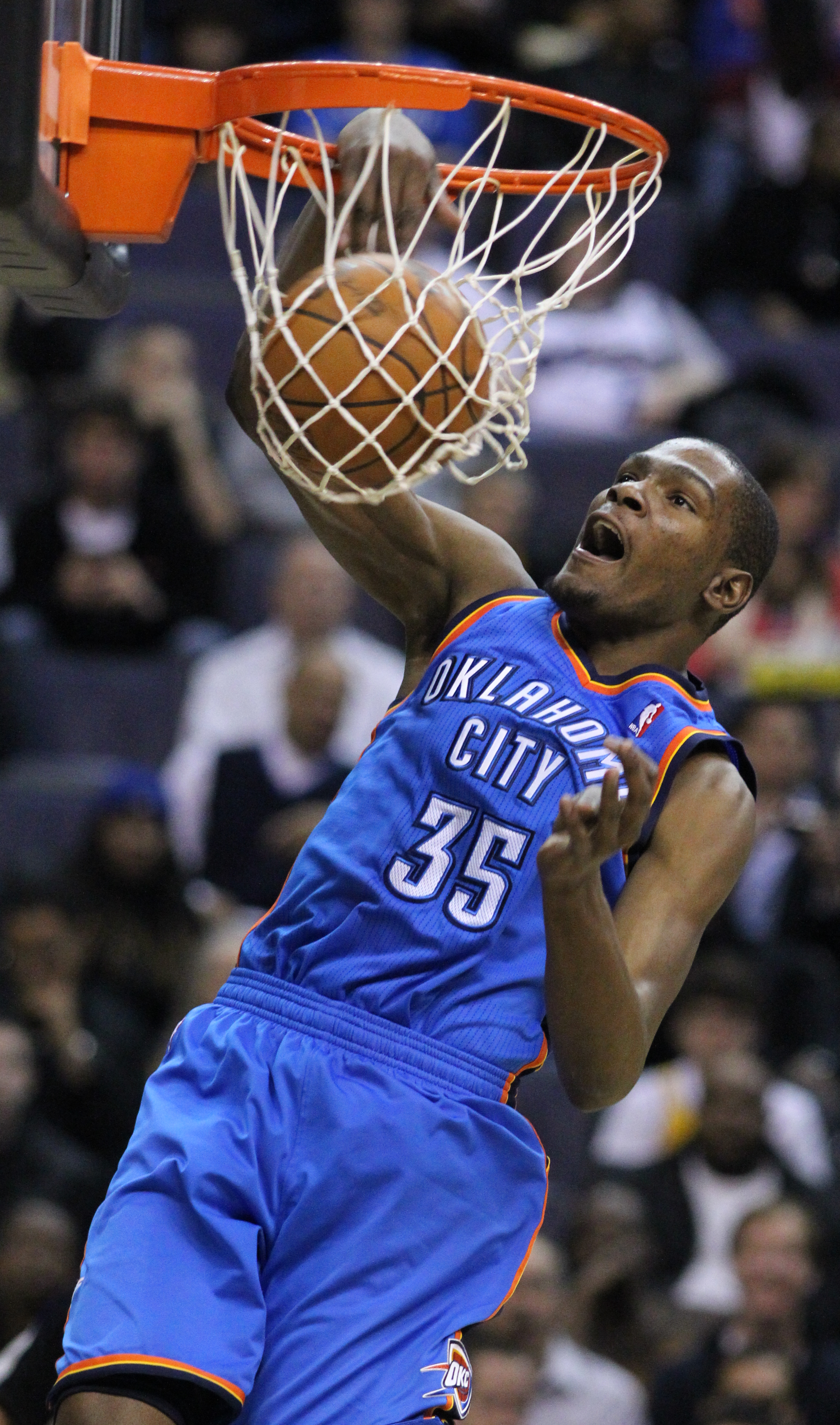
Durant scores on a slam dunk in March 2011

Before the 2010–11 season, Durant announced on Twitter that he had signed a five-year contract extension with the Thunder worth about $86 million. For the second consecutive year, Durant led the NBA in scoring, averaging 27.7 points a game. Behind his leadership, the Thunder won 55 games and earned the fourth seed in the Western Conference. In the 2011 NBA playoffs, Oklahoma City defeated the Denver Nuggets and Memphis Grizzlies en route to a Conference Finals match-up against the Dallas Mavericks, losing in five games.

On February 19 of the lockout-shortened 2011–12 season, Durant recorded his first career 50-point game, scoring 51 points against the Denver Nuggets. At the All-Star Game, he scored 36 points and was awarded the NBA All-Star Game Most Valuable Player Award. Durant finished the year with a scoring average of 28 points per game, representing his third straight scoring title. Behind his play, the Thunder won 47 games and entered the 2012 NBA playoffs as the Western Conference's second seed. In Game 1 of the first round against the Dallas Mavericks, Durant hit a game-winner with 1.5 seconds remaining. Oklahoma City went on to defeat Dallas 4–0, the Lakers 4–1, and the San Antonio Spurs 4–2 before losing to the Miami Heat 1–4 in the 2012 NBA Finals. For the NBA Finals, Durant led all players with 30.6 points per game, doing so on a 54.8 shooting rate.

==== 50–40–90 season (2012–2013) ====
With a scoring average of 28.1 points per game to finish the 2012–13 season, Durant failed to defend his scoring title; however, with a 51 percent shooting rate, a 41.6 percent three point shooting rate, and a 90.5 free throw shooting rate, Durant became the youngest player in NBA history to join the 50–40–90 club. Finishing the year with a 60–22 record, the Thunder earned the first seed in the Western Conference. In the first round of the 2013 NBA playoffs against the Houston Rockets, Westbrook tore his meniscus, forcing him to miss the remainder of the postseason. Without Westbrook, Durant was given more responsibility, averaging a career-high 30.8 points per game throughout the playoffs, the Thunder defeated Houston 4–2 but were eliminated in the second round 1–4 by the Memphis Grizzlies.

==== MVP season (2013–2014) ====
In January of the 2013–14 season, Durant averaged 35.9 points per game while scoring 30 or more points in 12 straight games, including a career-high 54 points against the Golden State Warriors. In April, he surpassed Michael Jordan's record for consecutive games scoring 25 points or more: 41. The Thunder finished the year with 59 wins and Durant was voted the NBA Most Valuable Player behind averages of 32.0 points, 7.4 rebounds, and 5.5 assists per game.

To begin the first round of the 2014 NBA playoffs, he struggled against the physical play of the Grizzlies, converting on only 24 percent of his field goals in game 4. Through five games, the Thunder trailed the series 3–2, prompting The Oklahoman to dub Durant "Mr. Unreliable". He responded by scoring 36 points in a Game 6 victory. Oklahoma City eventually eliminated Memphis and the Los Angeles Clippers before losing to the San Antonio Spurs in the Western Conference Finals in six games.

==== Final seasons with the Thunder (2014–2016) ====
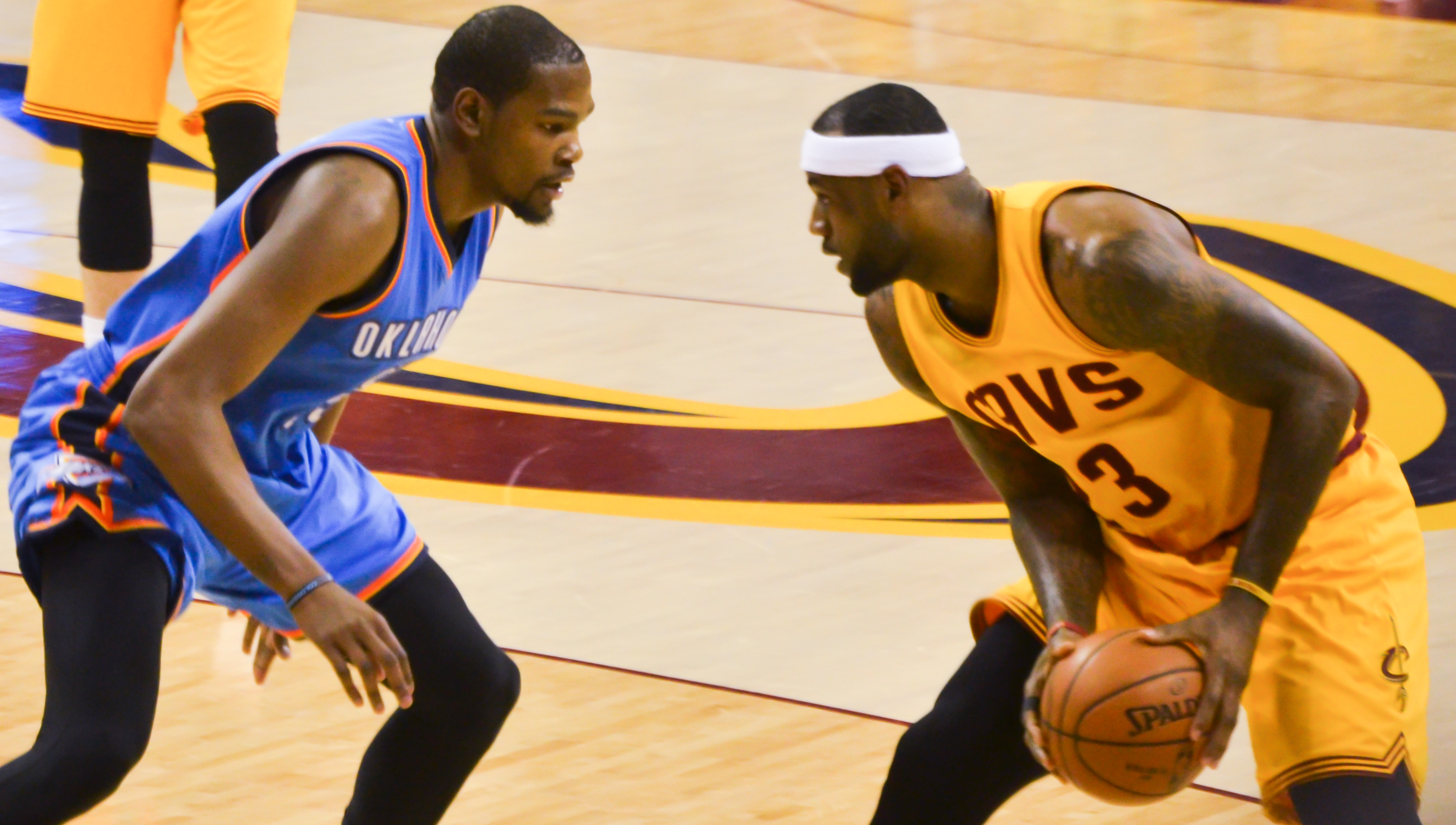
Durant guarding LeBron James in January 2015

Before the 2014–15 season, Durant was diagnosed with a Jones fracture in his right foot and was ruled out for six to eight weeks. Durant missed the first 17 games of the year, then made his season debut for the Thunder on December 2 against the New Orleans Pelicans. On December 18, Durant injured his ankle against the Golden State Warriors, returning to action on December 31 against the Phoenix Suns to score a season-high 44 points. Durant then sprained his left big toe in late January. On February 22, he was sidelined again after undergoing a minor procedure to help reduce pain and discomfort in his surgically repaired right foot, and on March 27, Durant was officially ruled out for the rest of the season after deciding to undergo foot surgery. In just 27 games, he averaged 25.4 points, 6.6 rebounds, and 4.1 assists per game.

To begin the 2015–16 season, Durant and Westbrook reached several historical milestones together, including becoming the first pair of teammates to each score at least 40 points in a single game since 1996, doing so in a win over the Orlando Magic on October 30. For the year, Durant averaged 28.2 points, 8.2 rebounds, 5.0 assists, and 1.2 blocks per game, leading the Thunder to 55 wins and the third seed in the West. In Game 2 of the first round of the 2016 NBA playoffs against the Mavericks, Durant scored 21 points but converted only seven out of 33 shots in the worst postseason shooting performance of his career, both by shooting percentage and by number of shots missed. After defeating Dallas, Oklahoma City moved on to face the San Antonio Spurs in the second round, falling behind 2–1 to start the series. In Game 4, Durant tied his playoff career high with 41 points in a Thunder win. Oklahoma City eventually defeated the Spurs in six games, drawing a matchup with the record-setting 73-win Golden State Warriors in the Conference Finals. Despite going up 3–1, the Thunder were ousted in seven games, with Durant providing 27 points in Game 7.

=== Golden State Warriors (2016–2019) ===
==== First championship and finals MVP (2016–2017) ====
On July 4, Durant announced his intention to sign with the Golden State Warriors in The Players' Tribune. The move was panned by fans and pundits, who felt Durant took the easy route by forming a superteam with a Warriors squad coming off a record-setting 73-win season in 2016 and a championship in 2015, compounded by the Thunder's blown 3–1 series lead against those Warriors. On July 7, Durant signed on with Golden State with a two-year, $54.3 million contract with a player option after the first year. In Sports Illustrated, Ben Golliver wrote, "He chose an ideal roster fit and a shot at playing for the highest-scoring offense the NBA has seen in decades. He chose life alongside Stephen Curry and Klay Thompson, the greatest shooting backcourt in history, and he chose to go against Andre Iguodala and Draymond Green, two elite defenders, in practices rather than in Western Conference finals games."

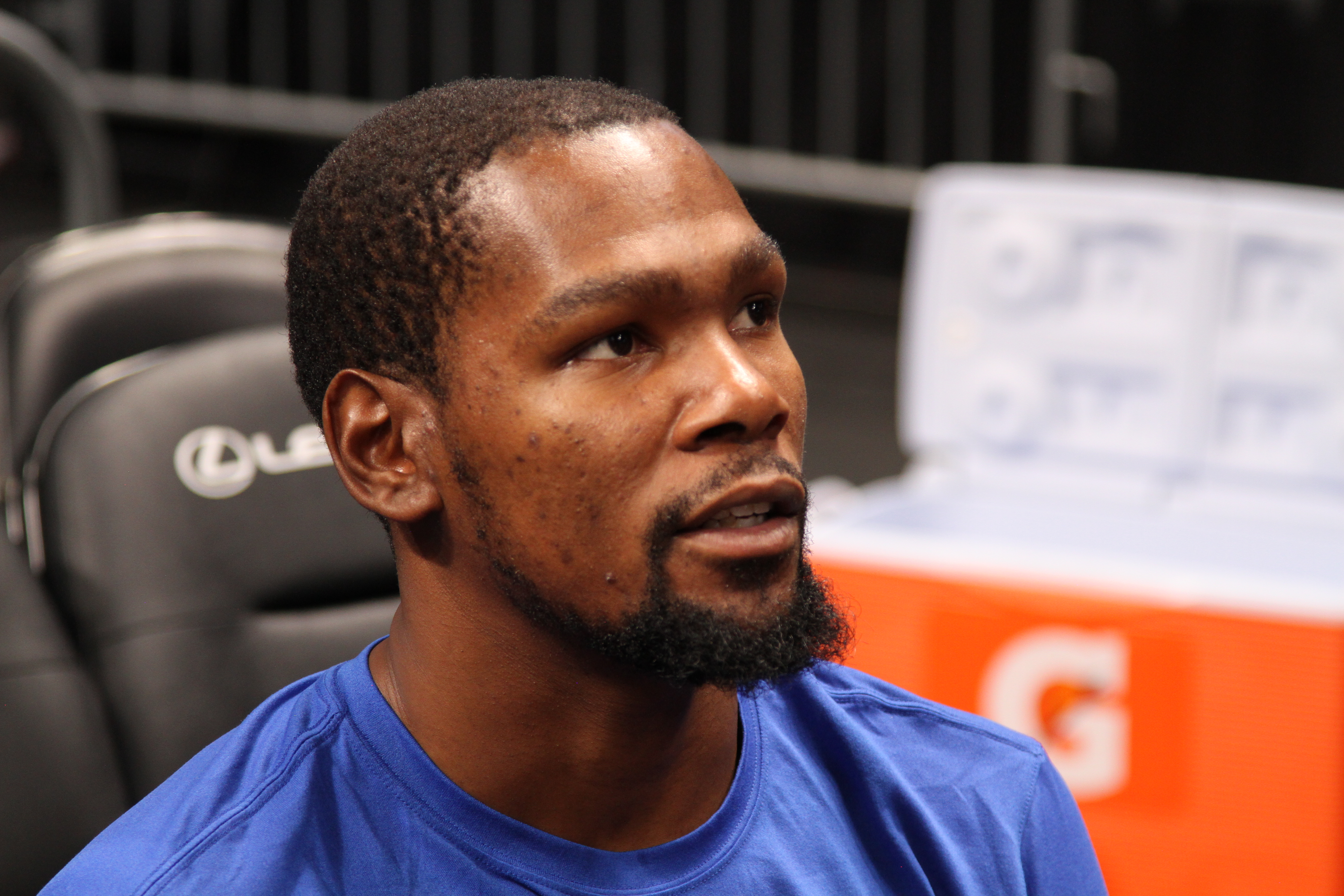
Durant after Warriors' practice in 2017

Durant made his debut for the Warriors on October 25 against the San Antonio Spurs, scoring a team-high 27 points in a blowout loss. On November 26, he recorded 28 points, 10 rebounds, five assists, and a career-high six blocked shots in a win over the Minnesota Timberwolves, becoming the first player in team history to finish with at least 25 points, 10 rebounds, five assists, and five blocks in a single game. On February 11, in his first game back in Oklahoma City since leaving for Golden State, Durant scored 34 points while being booed throughout the night as he helped the Warriors defeat the Thunder for the third time that year. In March, Durant suffered a Grade 2 MCL sprain and a tibial bone bruise in his left knee, which forced him to miss the final 19 games of the season. The Warriors finished the 2016–17 season with a 67–15 record and entered the playoffs as the first seed.

Durant returned from injury in time for the 2017 NBA playoffs and helped the Warriors advance to their third consecutive Finals, while also becoming the first team in league history to start the postseason 12–0. In Game 1 of the series, Durant had 38 points, eight rebounds, and eight assists to lead the Warriors past LeBron James and the defending champion Cleveland Cavaliers. Durant then helped the Warriors go up 3–0 in the series with a 31-point effort in Game 3, including the go-ahead 3-pointer with 45.3 seconds left in regulation. In Game 5, he scored 39 points to go with seven rebounds and five assists in a series-clinching win. For the Finals, Durant was the Golden State's top scorer in every game, averaging 35.2 points, 8.4 rebounds, and 5.4 assists while shooting 55.5 percent from the field, 47.4 percent from three-point range, and 92.7 percent from the free throw line. He was subsequently named the NBA Finals MVP. The Warriors finished the playoffs with a 16–1 record, the best postseason winning percentage in NBA history.

==== Second championship and finals MVP (2017–2018) ====
After the 2017 NBA Finals, Durant declined his $27.7 million player option and became an unrestricted free agent. On July 25, he re-signed with the Warriors on a two-year, $51.25 million contract, taking less money than the maximum, which helped the franchise create enough salary cap space to keep their core roster intact and add free agents.

On January 10, Durant scored 40 points in a loss to the Los Angeles Clippers, becoming the second-youngest player in league history to reach the 20,000-point milestone. On January 23, he registered a career-high 14 assists in a win over the New York Knicks. On February 14, Durant scored a season-high 50 points in a loss to the Trail Blazers. In March, he missed games with a fractured rib, joining teammates Stephen Curry and Klay Thompson on the sidelines for the back-end of the season. The Warriors eventually finished the year with 58 wins and Durant set a career high for blocks in season with 119.

In Game 1 of the Western Conference Finals, Durant scored 37 points during a 119–106 victory over the higher-seeded Houston Rockets. Through six games, the Warriors found themselves trailing 3–2, and Durant was criticized for contributing to Golden State's struggles by playing too much in isolation. The Warriors staved off elimination with a 29-point 115-86 blowout victory in Game 6, and a 101-92 victory in Game 7, one that saw the Houston Rockets take an early 15-point 48-33 lead in the second quarter, and an 11-point 54-43 lead by halftime, after a series of missed foul calls, the Rockets would end up missing 27 consecutive shots for roughly 19 minutes and 18 three-pointers. Durant scored 34 points, helping Golden State return to the Finals with a series-clinching victory.

In Game 3 of the 2018 NBA Finals, Durant recorded a playoff career-high 43 points, 13 rebounds, and seven assists in a win over the Cleveland Cavaliers, leading the Warriors to a 3–0 advantage. Golden State ultimately swept Cleveland and clinched a second straight championship; with averages of 28.8 points, 10.8 rebounds, and 7.5 assists. Durant won a second back-to-back Finals MVP Award.

==== Three-peat chase and injury (2018–2019) ====
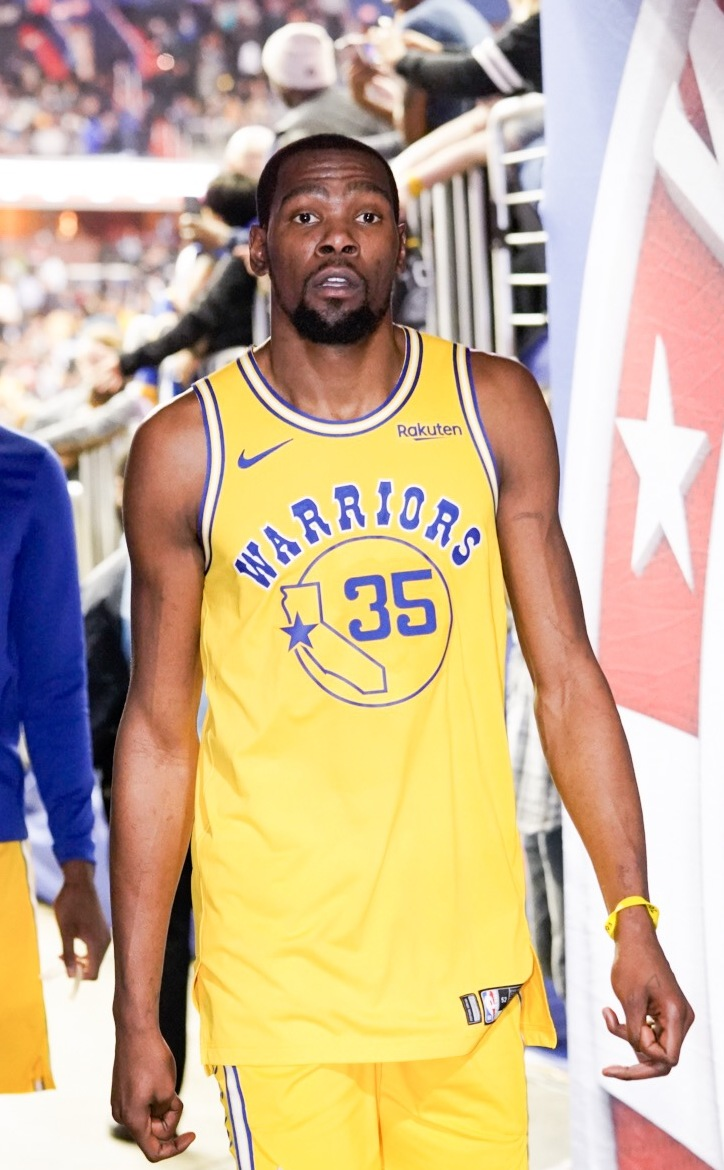
Durant in 2019

On July 7, 2018, Durant re-signed with the Warriors, on a reported two-year, $61.5 million contract, which included a player option for the second year.

During an overtime loss to the Clippers on November 12, Draymond Green cursed out Durant over his upcoming free agency status after the season, and he was suspended for the much-publicized blowup. On November 29, Durant scored a season-high 51 points in a 131–128 overtime loss to the Toronto Raptors, thus scoring 40 or more in his third straight game. With Curry and Green sidelined for most of November, the Warriors finished the month with a 15–8 record and five straight road losses after starting the season at 10–1.

In Game 5 of the first round of the playoffs, he scored a playoff career-high 45 points in a 129–121 loss to the Los Angeles Clippers. In Game 6, he set a new playoff career high with 50 points in a 129–110 win to close out the series. During Game 5 of the Western Conference semifinals against the Houston Rockets, Durant suffered a right calf strain, subsequently missing Game 6, in which the Warriors won the series, as well as the entire Western Conference Finals against the Portland Trail Blazers, which the Warriors won in a four-game sweep.

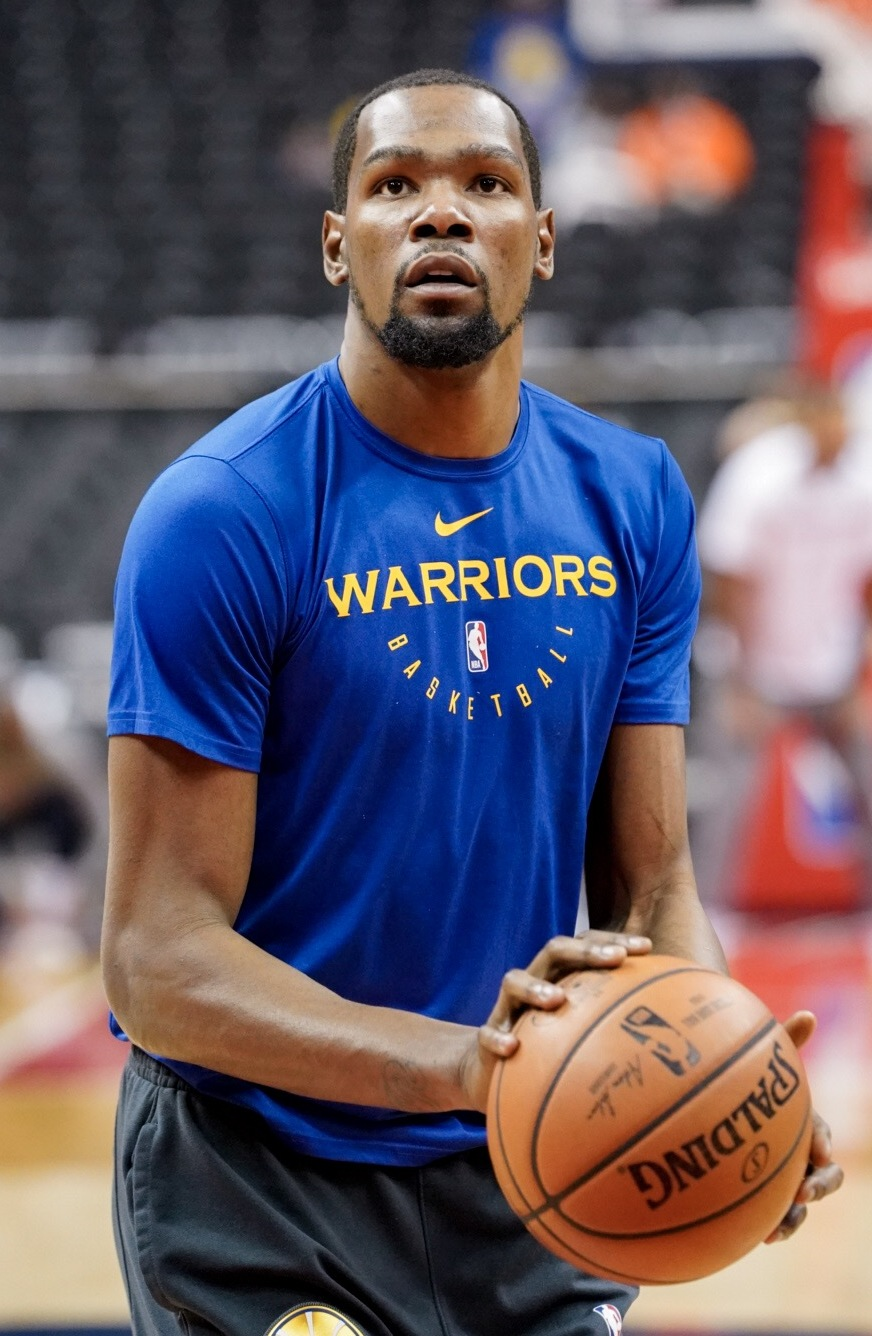
Durant warming up in 2019

After missing nine games with the strained right calf, Durant returned to action in Game 5 of the 2019 NBA Finals against Toronto, and scored 11 points in the first quarter. However, he was lost for the game two minutes into the second quarter when trying to drive by former teammate Serge Ibaka and suffered an Achilles tendon injury, falling and grabbing his lower right calf. Durant limped off the court and was helped to the locker room. The Warriors won the game 106–105 to cut the Raptors' series lead to 3–2. However, the Warriors went on to lose Game 6 by a score of 114–110, ending their quest for a three-peat.

=== Brooklyn Nets (2019–2023) ===
==== Year absence (2019–2020) ====
On June 30, 2019, Durant announced that he planned to sign with the Brooklyn Nets after the July moratorium ended on July 6. On July 1, Golden State CEO Joe Lacob announced that Durant's No. 35 would no longer be issued by the Warriors. Durant signed with Brooklyn on July 7 on a four-year, $164.3 million contract, in a sign-and-trade deal. Durant did not appear at all in the 2019–20 season and later revealed that he had decided shortly after his June 2019 injury that he would be sitting out the entire 2019–20 season. On March 17, 2020, Durant and three other Nets players tested positive for COVID-19. On April 1, it was announced that Durant was cleared and had recovered.

==== Return to the court (2020–2021) ====
On December 22, 2020, Durant made his Nets debut, putting up 22 points, five rebounds, three assists, and three steals, in a 125–99 win over his former team, the Golden State Warriors. On January 14, 2021, James Harden was traded to the Nets in a blockbuster four-team deal, reuniting Durant with his former Thunder teammate. On January 16, 2021, Durant scored a season-high 42 points in a 122–115 win over the Orlando Magic. On February 5, due to health and safety protocols, Durant came off the bench for the first time in his career in a 117–123 loss to the Toronto Raptors. In February, Durant suffered a hamstring injury, which forced him to miss 23 games. On April 2, the NBA fined Durant $50,000 for private messages he sent through social media to actor Michael Rapaport in a feud. Durant made his return on April 7, 2021, scoring 17 points off the bench in a 139–119 win over the New Orleans Pelicans. The Nets finished the season with a 48–24 record, and the second seed in the East.

In Game 4 of the first round of the playoffs, Durant scored 42 points in a 141–126 win over the Boston Celtics to take a 3–1 lead in the series. In Game 5, he scored 24 points in a 123–109 win to close out the series.

In Game 1 against the Milwaukee Bucks in the Eastern Conference semifinals, Durant had 29 points and 10 rebounds in a 115–107 victory. In Game 5, he put up 49 points, 17 rebounds, and 10 assists, leading the Nets to a 114–108 comeback victory. In Game 7, Durant dropped 48 points, nine rebounds, and six assists, including a two-pointer to send the game into overtime, in the 115–111 loss. Durant's game-tying two-pointer in regulation time was set to be a game-winning three-pointer to send the Nets to the conference finals, but his toe being on the three-point line ruled it a two-pointer. His 48 points were the most in a Game 7 in NBA playoff history at the time.

==== Playoff disappointment (2021–2022) ====
On August 8, 2021, Durant signed a four-year, $198 million extension with the Nets.

On October 22, Durant recorded his thirteenth career triple-double, and first as a Net with 29 points, 15 rebounds, and 12 assists in a 114–109 comeback win over the Philadelphia 76ers. On November 10, Durant scored 30 points on 11-for-12 shooting in a 123–90 win over the Orlando Magic. On December 12, Durant scored a then season-high 51 points in a 116–104 win over the Detroit Pistons. On December 14, Durant recorded his fourteenth career triple-double with 34 points, 13 rebounds, and 11 assists in a 131–129 overtime win over the Toronto Raptors. On December 16, Durant scored 34 points, grabbed 11 rebounds, and dished out eight assists in a 114–105 win against the 76ers. On January 15, 2022, during a 120–105 victory over the New Orleans Pelicans, Durant exited in the second quarter after suffering a left knee injury, later revealed to be a sprained MCL, and was subsequently ruled out for four to six weeks.

Durant following the Nets' victory over the Utah Jazz on March 21, 2022.

On March 3, his first game back from injury Durant scored 31 points in a 113–107 loss to the Miami Heat. Two days later, he became the 23rd player in NBA history to reach 25,000 points. On March 13, Durant scored a then season-high 53 points and set a career-high for field goal attempts with 37, grabbed six rebounds, delivered nine assists along with two steals in a 110–107 win over the New York Knicks. It was his 60th career 40-point performance and his eighth career 50-point performance. On March 21, Durant put up 37 points, nine rebounds, and eight assists in a 114–106 win over the Utah Jazz and moved past Jerry West into 22nd place on the NBA all-time career scoring list. On March 29, Durant scored 41 points, grabbed 11 rebounds, delivered five assists along with three blocks in a 130–123 win over the Detroit Pistons. On April 2, he scored a career-high 55 points on 19-of-28 shooting from the field and also had made a career high 8-of-10 3-pointers in a 122–115 loss to the Atlanta Hawks. On April 10, in the final game of the regular season, Durant recorded his sixteenth career triple-double with a career-high 16 assists and added 20 points, 10 rebounds in a 134–126 win over the Indiana Pacers to lock up 7th spot for the play-in tournament.

On April 12, Durant in his first play-in appearance scored 25 points, grabbed 5 rebounds, dished out 11 assists along with 2 steals, and 3 blocks in a 115–108 win over the Cleveland Cavaliers to secure the #7-seed spot for the playoffs. In Game 1 of the first round of the playoffs against the Boston Celtics, Durant passed Jerry West for eighth place on the NBA all-time playoff career scoring list. Brooklyn would go on to lose to Boston in four games despite Durant's 39-point, 7-rebound and 9-assist outing in the 116–112 close-out loss in Game 4. Over the first three contests, he would be held to just under 37% shooting from the field, including a 4-of-17 shooting performance in Game 2, in a series dominated by the Celtics' top-ranked defense as Durant was swept for the first time in his 14-year NBA career.

==== Offseason trade request (2022–2023) ====
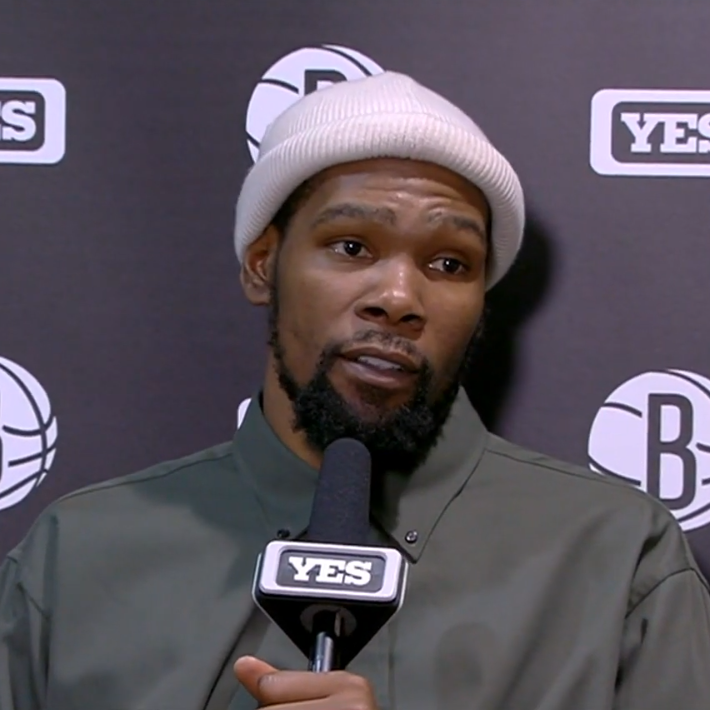
Durant during an interview in 2023

On June 30, 2022, it was reported that Durant had requested a trade from the Nets. Durant's preferred trade destinations were the Phoenix Suns and the Miami Heat. The favorites to land Durant were the Toronto Raptors and Boston Celtics, two teams which he had also been interested in. On August 24, 2022, Durant rescinded his trade request after meeting with Nets management.

On October 24, Durant scored 37 points on 14-for-20 shooting from the field in a 134–124 loss against the Memphis Grizzlies and moved past Alex English into 20th place on the NBA all-time career scoring list. On October 31, Durant recorded 36 points, nine rebounds, and seven assists in a 116–109 win over the Indiana Pacers. He passed Vince Carter for 19th on the NBA all-time career scoring list. Durant scored at least 25 points in each of the first seven games of the season, the most in franchise history. On November 9, Durant posted a triple-double with 29 points, 12 rebounds and 12 assists in an 112–85 win over New York Knicks. His rebounds and assists were both season highs. On November 17, Durant scored 35 points in a 109–107 win over the Portland Trail Blazers. He became just the 19th player all-time to reach 26,000 career points. Durant also tied Michael Jordan for the sixth most consecutive 25-point games to start a season with 16. On November 23, Durant passed Kevin Garnett for 18th place on the NBA all-time career scoring list in an 112–98 win over the Toronto Raptors. On November 29, Durant scored a season-high 45 points on 19-of-24 shooting from the field and added seven rebounds and five assists in 109–102 win over the Orlando Magic.

On December 18, Durant scored a career-high 26 of his 43 points in the third quarter, helping the Nets overcome a 17-point halftime deficit in a 124–121 victory over the Detroit Pistons. He was 8-of-10 from the floor, going 3 of 3 on 3-pointers and 7 of 7 from the free-throw line as he outscored the Pistons 26–25 in the third quarter. Durant has scored at least 40 points in his last three games against Detroit – the first player to do that since Rick Barry in the 1966–67 season. Durant also passed John Havlicek and Paul Pierce for 16th place on the NBA all-time career scoring list. On December 26, Durant put up 32 points, nine rebounds, and five assists in a 125–117 win over the Cleveland Cavaliers and moved past Tim Duncan for 15th on the NBA all-time career scoring list. In the next game, Durant had 26 points, a season-high 16 rebounds and 8 assists, and the Brooklyn Nets won their 10th straight game, 108–107 over the Atlanta Hawks. On January 3, despite Durant's 44-point outing on 15-of-22 shooting, 5-of-10 from three and 9-of-9 from the free throw line, the Chicago Bulls ended Brooklyn's 12-game winning streak. On January 8, Durant passed Dominique Wilkins for No. 14 on the NBA all-time career scoring list, though he ultimately exited the game against Miami with a right knee injury. The Nets closed out a 102–101 victory for their 18th win in 20 games. On January 26, Durant was named an Eastern Conference starter for the 2023 NBA All-Star Game, marking his thirteenth overall selection and eleventh as a starter.

=== Phoenix Suns (2023–2025) ===
==== 55–40–90 season (2023) ====
On February 9, 2023, the Nets traded Durant, along with T. J. Warren, to the Phoenix Suns in exchange for Mikal Bridges, Cameron Johnson, Jae Crowder, four unprotected first-round picks, and a 2028 first-round pick swap. Although Durant wanted to continue wearing No. 7 as he did in Brooklyn, the number was retired by the Suns in honor of Kevin Johnson. As a result, Durant announced that he would return to wearing the No. 35 jersey, which he had worn throughout his college and professional career prior to joining the Nets.

After being listed out since January 8 with a right knee injury, Durant made his Suns debut on March 1 against the Charlotte Hornets. He put up 23 points on 10-of-15 shooting in 27 minutes, contributing to the Suns' 105–91 win. On March 3 against the Chicago Bulls, Durant had another efficient night, scoring 20 points on 7-of-10 shooting. In addition, he moved up to 13th on the all-time scoring list, surpassing Oscar Robertson. Against the Dallas Mavericks on March 5, Durant led all scorers with 37 points, going 12-of-17 from the field and hitting the game-winning jump shot with 11.7 seconds left, guiding the Suns to a narrow 130–126 victory. Prior to his expected home debut against the Oklahoma City Thunder on March 8, Durant slipped on the court during pregame warmups and injured his left ankle. He was ruled out roughly 15 minutes before the opening tip-off. A day later, the Suns announced that Durant had suffered a left ankle sprain and would be re-evaluated in three weeks. After missing the last 10 games, he made his return on March 29 against the Minnesota Timberwolves. In his home debut, Durant put up 16 points and eight rebounds in 29 minutes, contributing to a 107–100 win. In his eight games with Phoenix, Durant finished with an 8–0 record, averaging 26.0 points in 33.6 minutes per game and helping the Suns finish fourth in the Western Conference. He also finished the regular season shooting over 55% from the field, over 40% from three-point range, and over 90% from the free throw line, becoming the first player in NBA history to achieve those shooting splits in a season.

On April 16, Durant in his Suns playoff debut posted a near triple-double with 27 points, 9 rebounds and a playoff career-high 11 assists in a 115–110 loss against the Los Angeles Clippers. In Game 4 of the Suns' first-round playoff series against the Clippers, Durant logged 31 points, 11 rebounds and six assists in a 129–124 win, to lead the Suns to a 3–1 series lead. Four days later in Game 5 against the Clippers, Durant scored 31 points in a 136–130 win to close out the series. In Game 2 of the Western Conference semifinals against the Denver Nuggets, Durant passed Karl Malone to climb into seventh place for NBA postseason scoring. Four days later, Durant recorded 39 points, nine rebounds and eight assists in a 121–114 Game 3 win. The Suns eventually lost the series to the eventual NBA champion Nuggets in six games. However, throughout Denver's entire championship run, Phoenix was the only team to win more than one game against the Nuggets in a single playoff series.

==== Top 10 in all-time scoring (2023–2024) ====
On October 31, 2023, Durant put up 26 points in a 115–114 loss to the San Antonio Spurs. He passed Hakeem Olajuwon for 12th on the all-time career scoring list and became the 12th player all-time to reach 27,000 career points. On November 17, Durant recorded 38 points, nine rebounds and nine assists on 15-of-22 shooting from the field in a 131–128 win over the Utah Jazz. On November 21, Durant put up 31 points in a 120–107 win over the Portland Trail Blazers. He also passed Elvin Hayes for 11th place on the all-time career scoring list. On December 1, Durant put up 30 points and 11 assists in a 119–111 loss to the reigning NBA champion Denver Nuggets in a rematch of the previous season's Western Conference Semi-Finals. He also passed Moses Malone for 10th place on the all-time career scoring list. On December 27, Durant put up his 18th career triple-double, dropping 27 points, 10 rebounds and tying his career-high with 16 assists in a 129–113 victory over the Houston Rockets.

On January 21, 2024, Durant scored 40 points and grabbed nine rebounds on 18-of-25 shooting from the field in a 117–110 win over the Indiana Pacers. He became the first Sun and the 14th player in NBA history to score 40 points with zero free throw attempts. On January 22, Durant put up 43 points, six rebounds, and eight assists alongside a game-winning mid-range jumpshot in a 115–113 win over the Chicago Bulls. On January 25, Durant was named a Western Conference starter for the 2024 NBA All-Star Game, marking his fourteenth overall selection and twelfth as a starter. On January 28, in a game against the Orlando Magic, Durant became the 10th player in NBA history to reach 28,000 career points. On January 31, Durant made his return to Brooklyn for the first time since getting traded. In the game, Durant finished with 33 points, eight assists, and five rebounds in a 136–120 victory over the Brooklyn Nets. On February 23, Durant put up 28 points, 11 rebounds, and eight assists in a 114–110 loss to the Rockets. He also passed Carmelo Anthony for 9th place on the all-time career scoring list. On March 9, Durant scored a season-high 45 points along with 10 rebounds and 6 assists in a 117–107 loss against the Boston Celtics. On March 20, Durant passed Shaquille O'Neal for eighth place on the all-time scoring list, finishing with 22 points in the Suns' 115–102 victory over the Philadelphia 76ers.

Durant finished the season averaging 27.1 points (fifth-highest in the league) and shot 52.3% from the field, 41.3% from three-point range, and 85.6% from the free throw line, one of just three qualified players to shoot at least 50/40/85 in those respective categories. Alongside Devin Booker, they became the third pair of teammates in NBA history to each average 27-plus points in the same season. In the playoffs, Durant averaged 26.8 points on 55.2% shooting from the field as he and the Suns were swept by the Minnesota Timberwolves in the first round, marking Durant's second time getting swept in the last three seasons.

==== 30,000 points and missing playoffs (2024–2025) ====
On October 26, 2024, in a game against the Dallas Mavericks, Durant reached 29,000 career points, becoming the eighth player to accomplish the feat. He led the Suns to a franchise-record 8–1 start, including a seven-game win streak before suffering a left calf strain on November 8 in a 114–113 victory over the Dallas Mavericks. Durant missed seven games, during which Phoenix went 1–6, and returned on November 27, posting 23 points and six rebounds in a 127–100 win over the Los Angeles Lakers. His return was short-lived, however, as he sprained his left ankle on December 3 in a 104–93 victory against the San Antonio Spurs. Durant missed three games, during which Phoenix went 0–3, and returned on December 13, scoring 30 points and dishing out 8 assists in a 134–126 win over the Utah Jazz. On December 21, Durant scored a season-high 43 points in a 133–125 loss against the Detroit Pistons.

On January 25, 2025, Durant was named a Western Conference starter for the 2025 NBA All-Star Game, marking his fifteenth overall selection and thirteenth as a starter. On February 11, in a game against the Memphis Grizzlies, Durant achieved 30,000 career points. On March 21, Durant had 42 points, six rebounds and eight assists in a 123–112 win over the Cleveland Cavaliers. With this performance, Durant joined LeBron James as the only players in NBA history to score 40 points against all 30 active teams. On March 30 against the Houston Rockets, Durant left the game in the third quarter with an ankle injury and did not return as the Suns lost 148–109. The injury sidelined him for the remainder of the season, as the Suns went 1–6 in their final seven games and finished 11th in the Western Conference, missing the postseason entirely. Durant finished the season leading the team in scoring with 26.6 points, 6.0 rebounds, and 4.2 assists in 62 games this season, but the season-ending injury caused him to fall short of the 65-game minimum required for end-of-season accolades. The Suns posted a 33–29 record with Durant in the lineup and went 3–17 in games he missed.

=== Houston Rockets (2025–present) ===
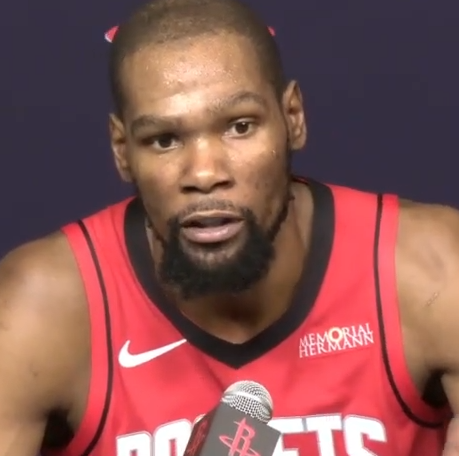
Durant during an interview in 2026

On July 6, 2025, Durant was traded to the Houston Rockets in a seven-team trade, the largest in NBA history. On October 19, Durant signed a two-year, $90 million contract extension with a player option for 2027–2028.

Playing against his former team, the Oklahoma City Thunder, Durant made his regular season debut with the Rockets on October 21, scoring 23 points in a 125–124 double overtime loss to the defending champions. With 2.2 seconds left in the first overtime, he signaled for a timeout even though Houston had no timeouts remaining. This would have ordinarily resulted in a technical foul, but no call was made as the officials failed to see his signal. Durant later fouled out with 2.3 seconds left in the second overtime, at which point Shai Gilgeous-Alexander made a pair of game-winning free throws to win the game. On December 5, Durant became the eighth player in NBA history to reach 31,000 career points, finishing the game with 28 points in a 117–98 win over his former team, the Phoenix Suns.

On January 5, 2026, Durant scored 26 points, grabbed 10 rebounds, and hit a game-winning three-pointer in a 100–97 victory over the Phoenix Suns. After the game, Durant admitted that hitting the game-winner felt even better against the Suns, saying he felt he was scapegoated during his time in Phoenix. On January 9, Durant recorded 30 points, 12 rebounds, four assists, and two blocks in a 111–105 loss to the Portland Trail Blazers. During the game, he surpassed Wilt Chamberlain to move into seventh place on the all-time scoring list and also surpassed 8,000 career rebounds. On January 18, Durant passed Dirk Nowitzki for sixth place on the all-time scoring list, finishing with 18 points in the Rockets' 119–110 win over the New Orleans Pelicans. On February 26, Durant scored a season-high 40 points (26 points in the second half) and grabbed eight rebounds to lead the Rockets to a 113–108 victory over the Orlando Magic. During the game, he became the sixth player in NBA history to reach 32,000 career points and tied Kobe Bryant for the fifth-most 30-point games in league history. He also became the first player in NBA history to score at least 40 points in a regular-season game for five different teams. The very next game, on February 28, Durant recorded 32 points, five rebounds, and eight assists in a 115–105 loss against the Miami Heat. With this performance, he passed Kobe Bryant to claim sole possession of fifth place on the NBA’s all-time list for 30-point games. On March 21, Durant passed Michael Jordan for fifth place on the all-time scoring list, finishing with 27 points in the Rockets' 123–122 win over the Miami Heat.

The Rockets finished the 2025–26 season with a 52–30 record, clinching the fifth seed in the playoffs. During their first-round series, they faced the Los Angeles Lakers. After missing Game 1 with an injury, Durant made his Rockets playoff debut on April 21, recording 23 points, six rebounds, and four assists in a 101–94 Game 2 loss. The Rockets ultimately lost the series in six games, with Durant missing games 3 through 6 with a right ankle sprain. On May 24, Durant was named to the All-NBA Second Team, marking his 12th career All-NBA selection. He also became the first player in NBA history to earn All-NBA honors with five different franchises.

== National team career ==
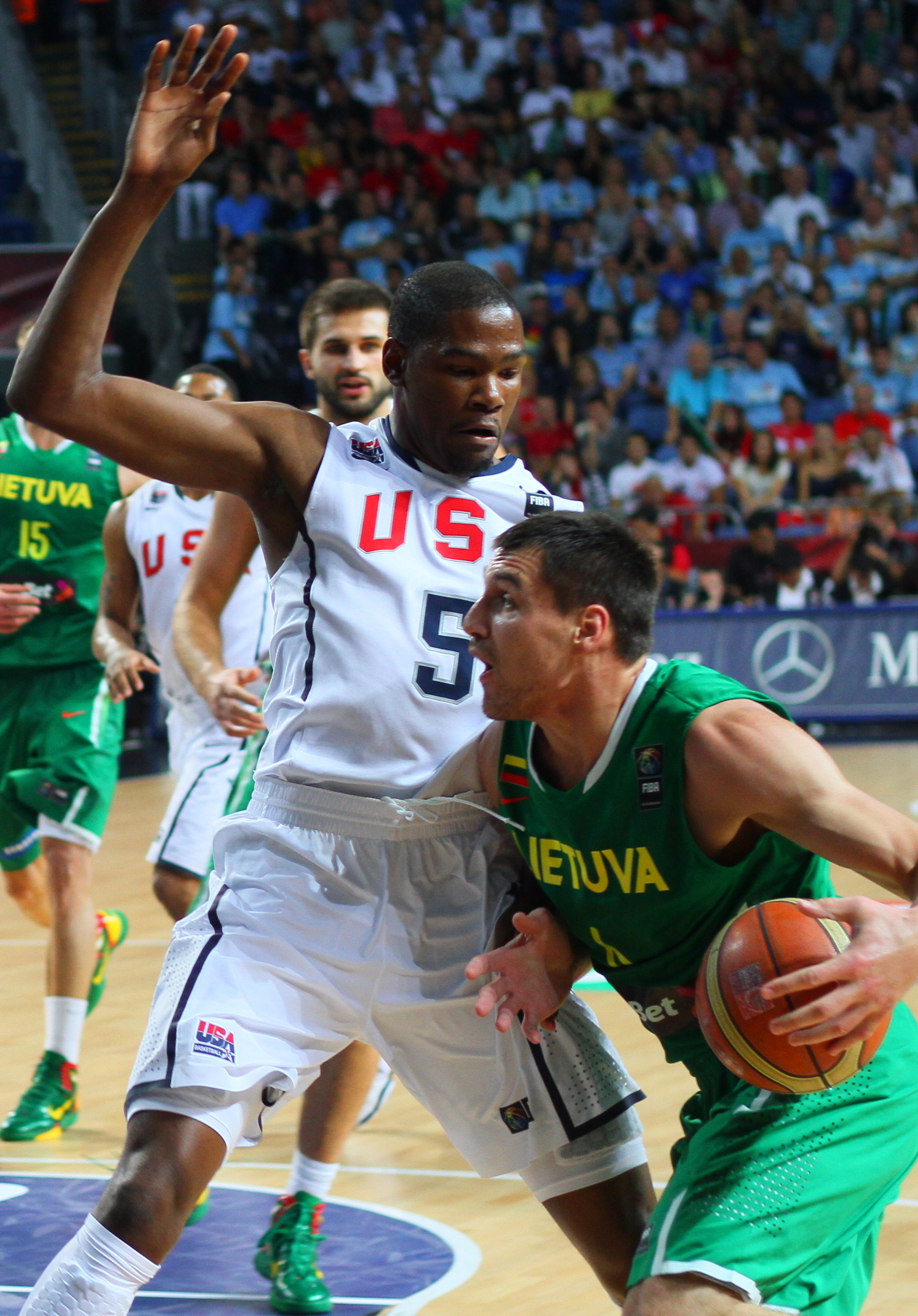
Kevin Durant defending against Jonas Mačiulis in 2010

In February 2007, Durant received an invitation to the United States national team training camp. Despite a strong performance, he was cut from the team when its roster was trimmed to its twelve-player limit. Coach Mike Krzyzewski cited the experience of the remaining players as the deciding factor in making the cut. Durant was finally selected to the national team at the 2010 FIBA World Championship and became their leader as other All-Stars were unavailable, a role he downplayed. At the tournament, he led Team USA to its first FIBA World Championship since 1994, earning tournament MVP honors in the process. Durant's final averages for the competition were 22.8 points, 6.1 rebounds, 1.8 assists, and 1.4 steals per game in nine games. In December, Durant was named 2010 USA Basketball Male Athlete of the Year for the first time in his career.

At the 2012 Olympics, Durant set the record for total points scored in an Olympic basketball tournament. With averages of 19.5 points, 5.8 rebounds, 2.6 assists, and 1.6 steals per game, he helped the national team go undefeated en route to a gold medal. In the tournament's final game, Durant led all scorers with 30 points. Less than a month before the start of the 2014 FIBA Basketball World Cup, Durant announced that he would be dropping out of the competition, citing mental and physical exhaustion as reasons for his departure. He rejoined Team USA on the 2016 Olympic team, where he led them to a gold medal. Durant's final averages for the competition were 19.4 points, 5.0 rebounds and 3.5 assists per game in eight games. In recognition of his performances, Durant was named the 2016 co-USA Basketball Male Athlete of the Year, along with Carmelo Anthony, for the second time in his career.

Durant committed to playing on the 2020 Olympic team, delayed until 2021 due to the COVID-19 pandemic. He entered the Games ranked second in U.S. men's Olympic basketball history with 311 career points, needing 25 to match Anthony's record of 336. He broke Anthony's record on July 31 against the Czech Republic, and led the unheralded U.S. squad to a gold medal, with FIBA naming him the tournament's MVP. Durant's 20.7 points per game set a U.S. Olympic men's single-competition record for points averaged, and he tied Carmelo Anthony for most Olympic gold medals (three). Durant is also one of just four U.S. male basketball athletes to play in three or more Olympics. In recognition of his accomplishments in the tournament, Durant was named 2021 USA Basketball Male Athlete of the Year for the third time in his career.

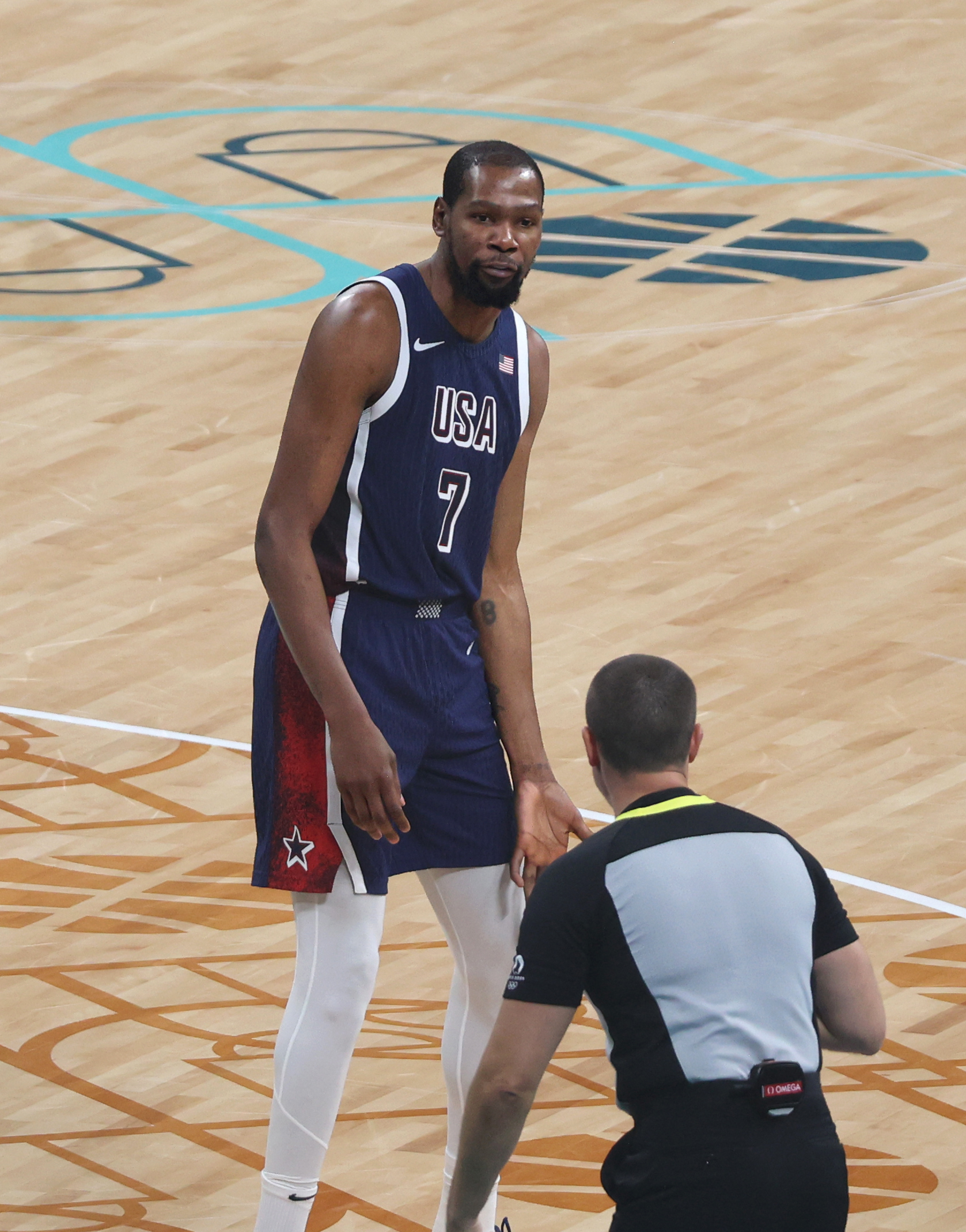
Durant at the 2024 Olympic Games

In 2024, aged 35, Durant made his fourth Olympic appearance on the 2024 Olympic team. He missed all of the exhibition games due to a calf injury he suffered, making his first appearance with the new-look squad against Serbia. On August 4, Durant became the United States' all-time rebounding leader at the Olympics, surpassing Carmelo Anthony, in a win against Puerto Rico. On August 7, he became the United States' all-time Olympic scoring leader, surpassing Lisa Leslie of the women's team, in a quarterfinal win against Brazil. Team USA won the gold medal in a rematch against France, making Durant the first and only four-time gold medalist in men's basketball.

From 2010 to 2024, Durant played with the senior men's United States national team in 37 official games, in major FIBA tournaments, averaging 18.8 points, 4.9 rebounds and 2.9 assists. Overall, he brought home five gold medals as member of the national team: four from Olympic tournaments and one from the 2010 FIBA World Championship. Durant, who has led the US in scoring in three of his four Olympic appearances and at the 2010 FIBA World Championship, owns nine U.S. Olympic men's career records, including the top spot for points (518), points averaged (18.5), rebounds (137), field goals made (173) and attempted (326), 3-point field goals made (88) and attempted (175), free throws made (84) and attempted (96).

== Player profile ==
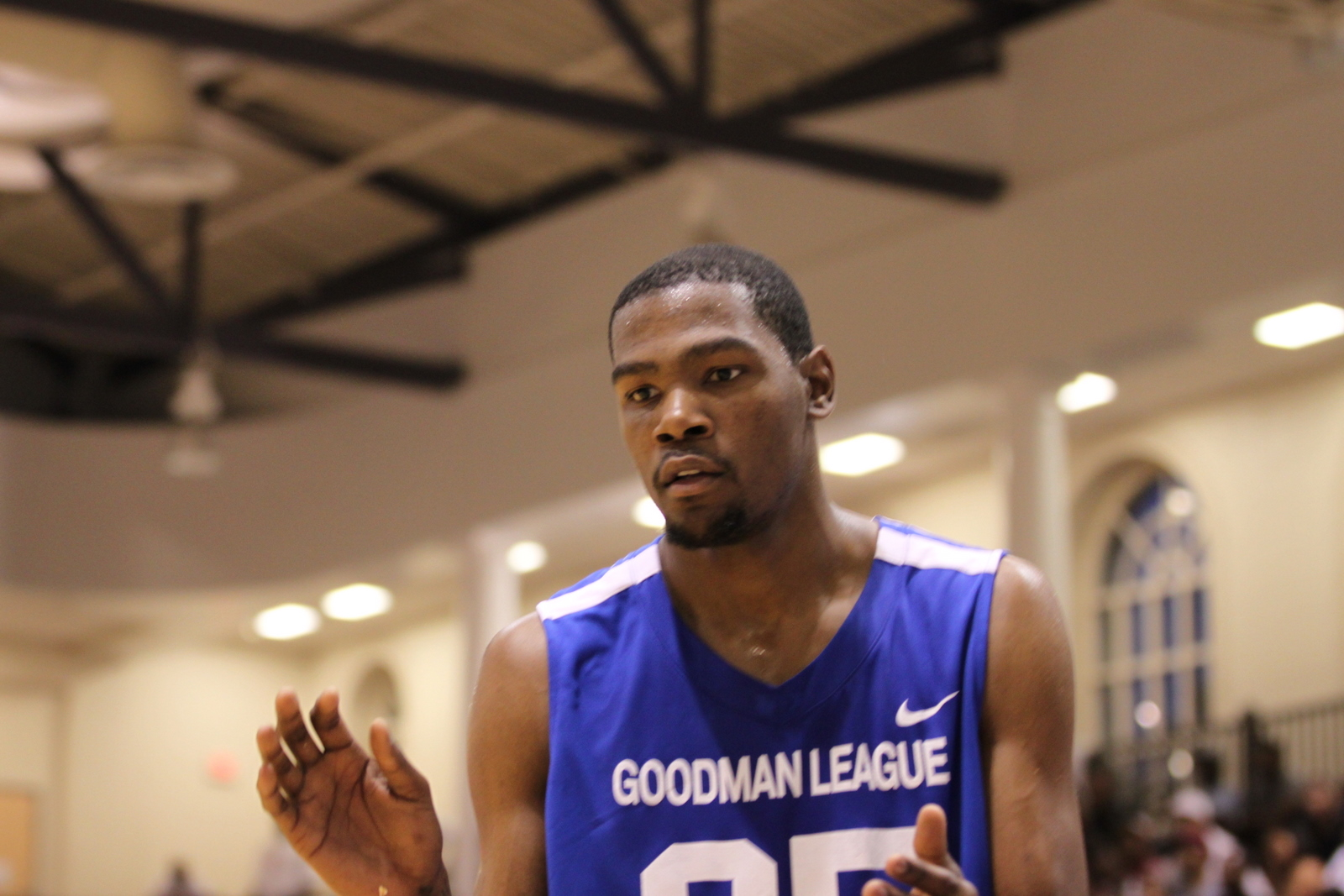
Durant playing in a game between the Drew League and the Goodman League in August 2011

Durant's height is officially listed as 6 ft 11 in (2.11 m) and his primary position is small forward. In December 2016, when his height was still listed as 6 ft 9 in, Durant stated that his height in shoes was actually 7 ft 0 in (2.13 m) and that he understated his height in order to be listed as a small forward, rather than a power forward. Durant's career averages are 27.1 points, 6.9 rebounds, and 4.4 assists per game. Widely regarded as one of the greatest players of all time, Durant has earned All-NBA honors 12 times (2010–2014, 2016–2019, 2022, 2024, 2026) and was voted rookie of the year in his debut season. He has also won an MVP Award and finished second in the voting thrice, a trend that he has expressed frustration over.

Durant is best known for his prodigious scoring ability. His shooting and scoring abilities have given him the nickname "Easy Money Sniper". From 2010 to 2014, he won four scoring titles, becoming one of only two players to win four scoring titles in a five-year span. Early in his career, his playing style was isolation-driven, but Durant quickly developed into an excellent off-ball player who was capable of scoring from the outside as well. By 2013, he was shooting at a historically great clip, which helped him become one of only nine members of the 50–40–90 club. This ability to impact the offense in a variety of ways helped Durant remain effective and improve an already elite offense upon joining the Warriors in 2016. Throughout his career, Durant's height and 7 ft 4 in (2.24 m) wingspan have created matchup problems for defenses as he is able to get off a clean shot regardless of the situation. Upon beating his man or gaining momentum, Durant also becomes a strong finisher at the rim; for example, he converted 72.2% of shots in the paint in 2012.

Early in Durant's career, he was criticized for his slim build, defense, and passing. Over time, Durant grew as a playmaker, increasing his assist numbers every year from 2010 to 2014, though his overall vision still lagged behind that of the league's best passers. Durant also showed defensive improvement, with opponents averaging just .62 points per isolation play against him in 2014, the best success rate for defensive players who faced at least 100 isolations that season. Upon going to Golden State, Durant developed into a more reliable off-ball defender and rim protector, and in 2018 was considered for the NBA Defensive Player of the Year Award.

== Personal life ==
Durant is very close with his mother, Wanda, a relationship that was detailed in the Lifetime movie The Real MVP: The Wanda Durant Story. During his time with the Thunder, Durant described himself as a "high school kid" who enjoys playing video games in his spare time.

Durant is a Christian who attended Baptist schools. He has religious tattoos on his stomach, wrist, and back.

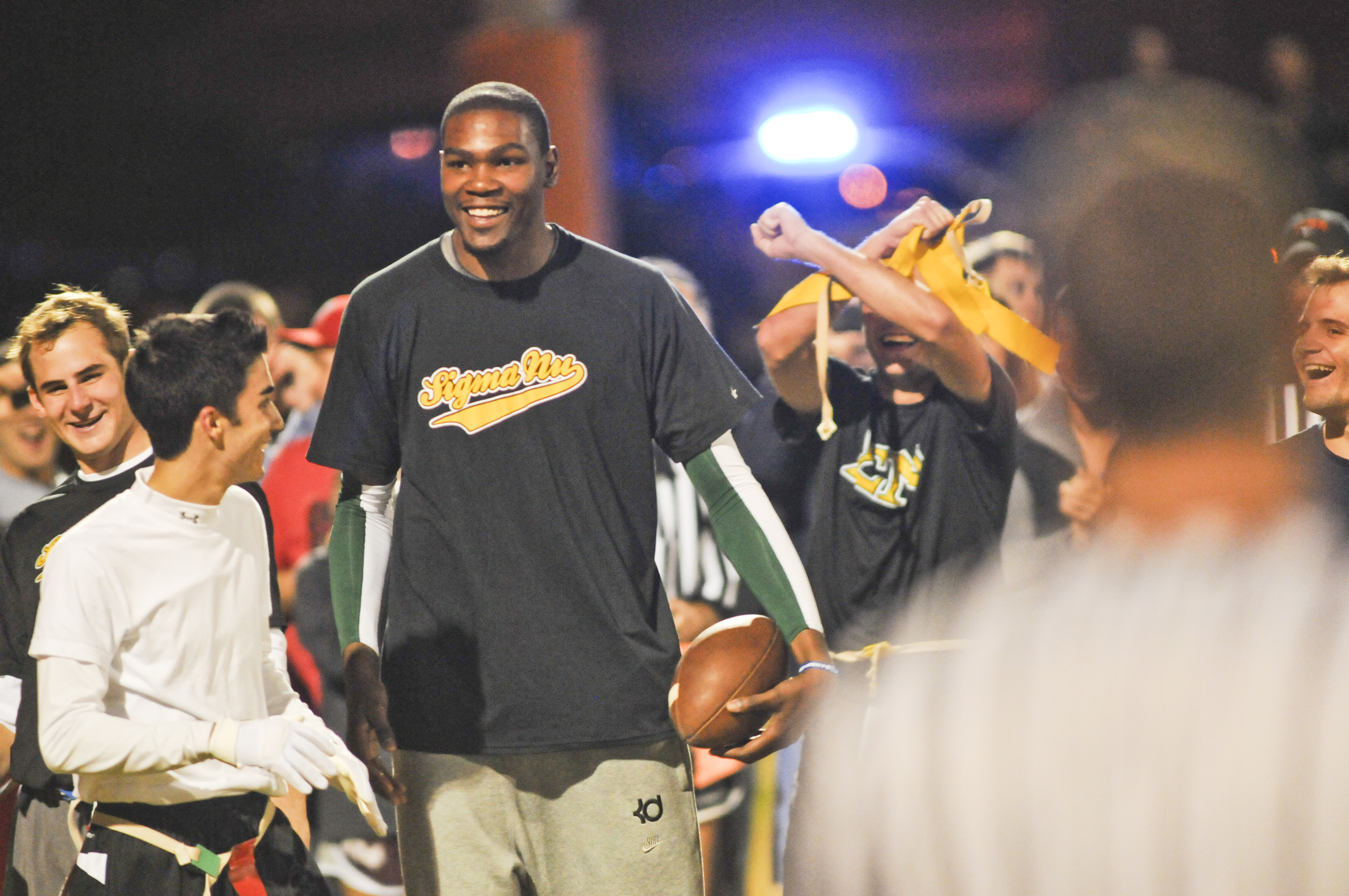
Durant during a flag football game at Oklahoma State University in 2011

Durant owns several properties in the Oklahoma City area and listed his primary residence, located in the affluent Club Villa neighborhood, for sale for $1.95 million in 2013. That same year, Durant opened a restaurant, KD's Southern Cuisine, in the Bricktown neighborhood and briefly became engaged to Monica Wright, a WNBA player. In 2016, Durant was a credentialed photographer for The Players' Tribune at Super Bowl 50.

In an interview with Sports Illustrated, Durant claimed that, despite his high earnings potential, "global marketing and all that stuff" does not interest him.

=== Representation ===
Durant was formerly represented by agents Aaron Goodwin and Rob Pelinka. He left Pelinka in 2013 and signed with the Roc Nation group, headed by Jay-Z. Durant has endorsement deals with Nike, Sprint, Gatorade, Panini, General Electric, and 2K Sports. In 2012, he tried his hand at acting, appearing in the children's film Thunderstruck. In 2013, Durant earned $35 million, making him the fourth-highest-earning basketball player that year.

=== Reputation ===
One of the most popular players in the NBA, Durant's jersey regularly ranks as one of the league's best-selling and he is consistently one of the top All-Star vote-getters. Early in his career, Durant developed a reputation for his kind demeanor; in 2013, Foot Locker released a series of commercials calling him the "nicest guy in the NBA", and he became a beloved figure in Oklahoma City, known for his "nice escapades" toward the Thunder's staff. In 2014, Durant partnered with KIND snacks and launched StrongAndKind.com to show "being kind is not a sign of weakness." Since leaving the Thunder, Durant became more outspoken and controversial; for example, he was involved in a Twitter back-and-forth with CJ McCollum in July 2018. Durant has admitted to feeling more genuine in Golden State as opposed to Oklahoma City, where he was "just trying to please everybody."

=== Philanthropy ===
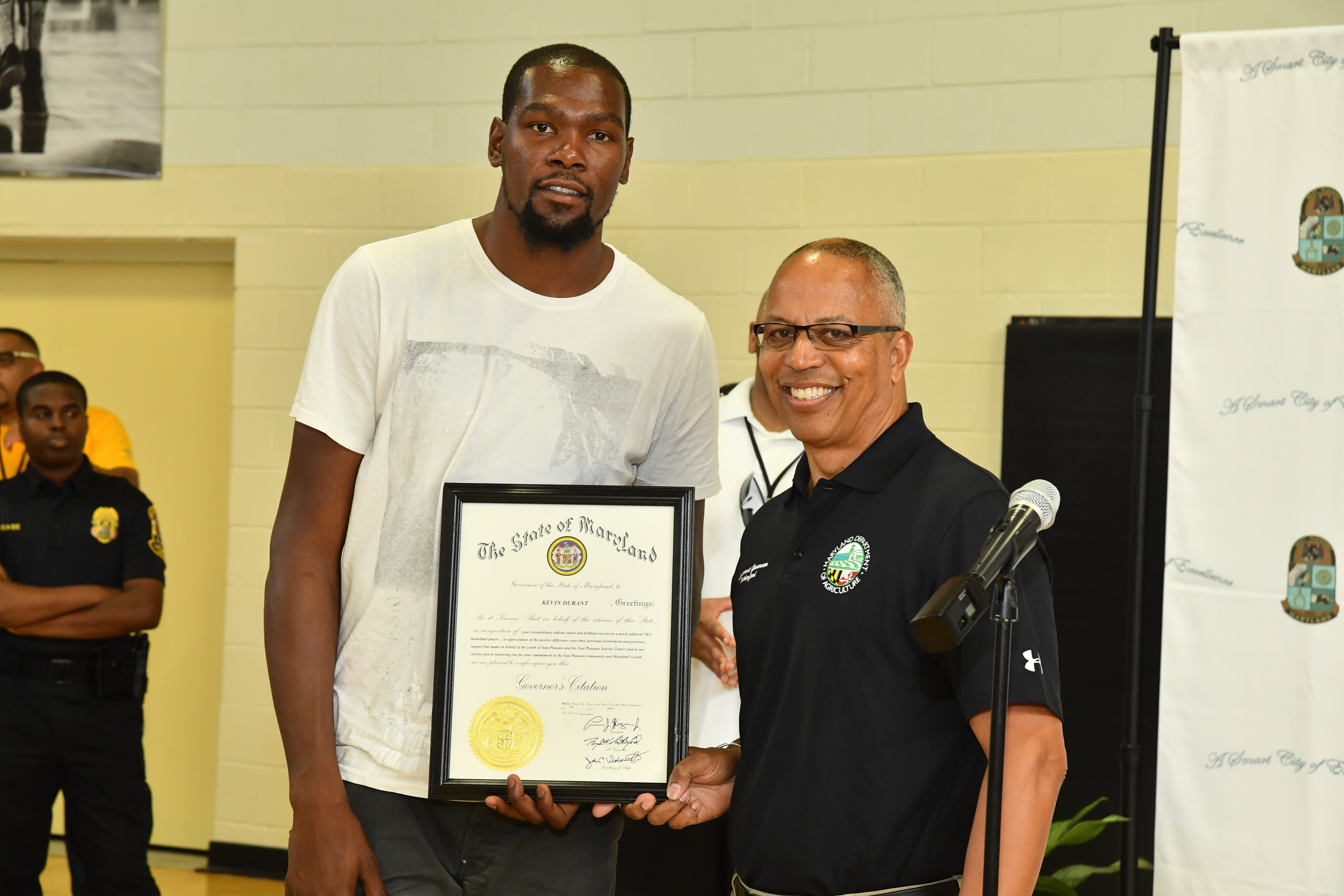
Durant with Maryland Lt. Governor Boyd Rutherford at Kevin Durant Day in 2017

Throughout his career, Durant has participated in philanthropic causes. In 2013, he pledged $1 million to the American Red Cross for the victims of the 2013 Moore tornado. Durant's generosity inspired the Thunder and Nike to match his donation. Durant is also a spokesperson for the Washington, D. C. branch of P'Tones Records, a nationwide non-profit after-school music program.

Durant's hometown Seat Pleasant in Prince George's County, Maryland announced Kevin Durant Day as August 17, 2017 in honor of his contributions to the community, as well as for his back-to-back NBA Championship wins and NBA Finals MVP awards.

Durant was included in Time magazine's 100 Most Influential People of 2018.

=== Social media use ===
Durant is active on Twitter, where he frequently interacts with fans and members of the media.

In 2017, Durant expanded his online presence to YouTube. In February of that year, he visited YouTube's headquarters for a speaking engagement. On April 7, 2017, he created a YouTube channel and began uploading livestream vlogs. In his first vlog, Durant explained that he had stepped away from other social media platforms, stating, "I got off the Instagram, Twitter, all that stuff, just to distance myself a bit. But somebody talked me into getting on the YouTube." As of June 2020, his channel had more than 790,000 subscribers and 38 million video views.

Durant was involved in a public dispute with actor Michael Rapaport in 2021 after private messages between the two were made public. The leaked exchanges showed Durant using homophobic, misogynistic, and profane language, including insults directed at Rapaport and comments about his wife. Following the release of the messages, Durant issued an apology on social media, stating on Twitter that he and Rapaport "talk CRAZIER than this on the regular" and adding "my bad I apologize" in a comment on Rapaport's Instagram account. The NBA later fined Durant for the incident.

Durant's alleged use of "burner" accounts, anonymous social media profiles used to respond to posts without being publicly identified, has drawn media attention and public scrutiny. In 2017, Durant used the third-person voice from his personal Twitter account to explain his decision to leave the Oklahoma City Thunder. He later apologized, describing his behavior as "acting so childish". Philadelphia 76ers center Joel Embiid subsequently joked about the incident, mockingly calling himself "better than Michael Jordan" and referencing @QuireSultan, an Instagram account some observers alleged was linked to Durant. In 2019, Durant said he had used a burner account on Twitter to interact privately with friends. In 2020, on the All The Smoke podcast with Matt Barnes and Stephen Jackson, he stated, "I'm still gonna do the burner thing. I'm still gonna do that." Conspiracies of him owning other burner accounts spiked again in 2026 when a Twitter account that was very critical of many of Durant's teammates on the Houston Rockets at the time seemed to point to his anonymous operating, though no definite proof ever surfaced.

=== Investments ===
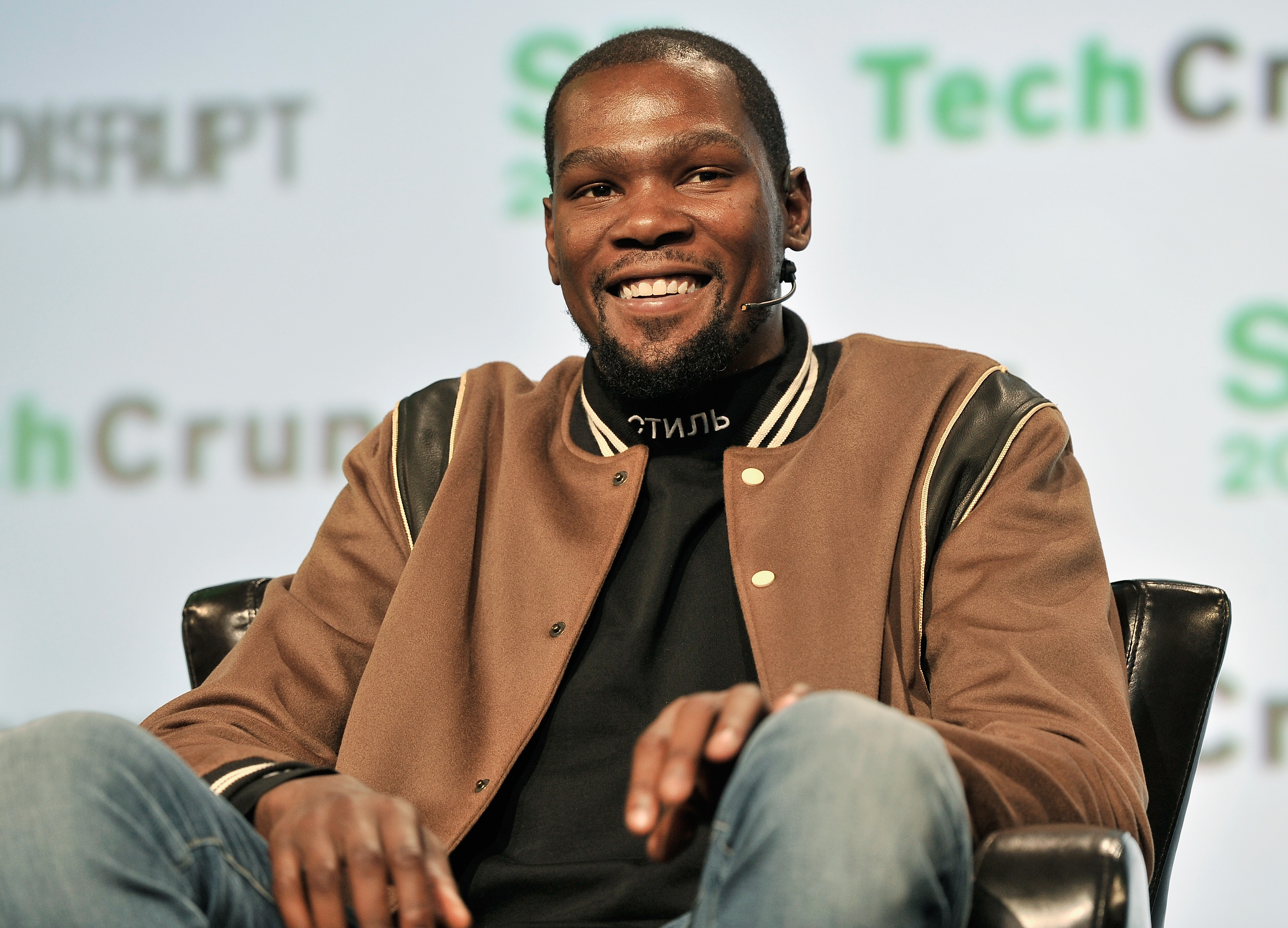
Durant speaking at TechCrunch Disrupt San Francisco in 2017

On February 13, 2018, Deadline reported that Durant, in partnership with producer Brian Grazer's Imagine Television, will create a basketball-themed scripted drama for Apple. Swagger, a TV show inspired by Durant's life story, premiered on Apple TV+ on October 29, 2021. Durant served as an executive producer.

In 2020, Durant became a passive investor of Skydio, an autonomous drone company. In 2026, Durant's investment was criticized by fans over Skydio's sale of drones to Israel during the Gaza war and ICE in the US.

On June 15, 2020, Durant became a minority owner of MLS side Philadelphia Union, acquiring a 5% stake with the possibility to add another 5% in the near future.

On December 22, 2021, Durant had signed a deal with Coinbase to serve as a brand ambassador.

==== Thirty Five Ventures ====
In 2017, Durant and business partner Rich Kleiman founded Thirty Five Ventures (35V). In 2020, Thirty Five Ventures produced Basketball County, a documentary about youth basketball in Durant's home county of Prince George's County, Maryland. Durant served as an executive producer and appeared in interviews. Thirty Five Ventures' work Two Distant Strangers won the 2021 Academy Award for Short Film (Live Action).

In May 2021, Durant (through Thirty Five Ventures) was announced as an investor in Just Women's Sports, an American media platform dedicated to women's sports. Durant credited the platform with showing "fans exactly how good these players are and why they're worth watching."

In October 2022, Durant joined fellow professional athletes LeBron James, Tom Brady, and Drew Brees as an investor in a professional pickleball team with his business partner, Rich Kleiman, via their Thirty Five Ventures firm.

In April 2026, Thirty Five Ventures acquired the Six Flags America amusement park property from Six Flags Entertainment Corporation. The 515-acre (208 ha) property is slated for mixed-use redevelopment.

==== Boardroom ====
In August 2021, Durant announced a partnership between his multimedia company Boardroom and the cannabis technology company Weedmaps through which an original content series would be developed and Weedmaps would become an official sponsor of Boardroom. Durant said of the partnership: "I think it's far past time to address the stigmas around cannabis that still exist in the sports world as well as globally. This partnership is going to help us continue to normalize those conversations, as well as create content, events, and a lot more through our Boardroom media network."

Durant and Rich Kleiman dismissed the full-time editorial team at Boardroom on February 21, 2026, a move that some observers speculated was connected to the scrutiny surrounding Durant's alleged burner accounts, although no official explanation was provided.

== Career statistics ==
Legend
GP	Games played	GS	Games started	MPG	Minutes per game
FG%	Field goal percentage	3P%	3-point field goal percentage	FT%	Free throw percentage
RPG	Rebounds per game	APG	Assists per game	SPG	Steals per game
BPG	Blocks per game	PPG	Points per game	**Bold**	Career high
†	Won an NBA championship	*	Led the league

=== NBA ===
==== Regular season ====
Year	Team	GP	GS	MPG	FG%	3P%	FT%	RPG	APG	SPG	BPG	PPG
2007–08	Seattle	80	80	34.6	.430	.288	.873	4.4	2.4	1.0	.9	20.3
2008–09	Oklahoma City	74	74	39.0	.476	.422	.863	6.5	2.8	1.3	.7	25.3
2009–10	Oklahoma City	**82***	**82***	**39.5**	.476	.365	.900	7.6	2.8	**1.4**	1.0	30.1*
2010–11	Oklahoma City	78	78	38.9	.462	.350	.880	6.8	2.7	1.1	1.0	27.7*
2011–12	Oklahoma City	66*	66*	38.6	.496	.387	.860	8.0	3.5	1.3	1.2	28.0*
2012–13	Oklahoma City	81	81	38.5	.510	.416	.905*	7.9	4.6	**1.4**	1.3	28.1
2013–14	Oklahoma City	81	81	38.5	.503	.391	.873	7.4	5.5	1.3	.7	**32.0***
2014–15	Oklahoma City	27	27	33.8	.510	.403	.854	6.6	4.1	.9	.9	25.4
2015–16	Oklahoma City	72	72	35.8	.505	.387	.898	8.2	5.0	1.0	1.2	28.2
2016–17†	Golden State	62	62	33.4	.537	.375	.875	**8.3**	4.8	1.1	1.6	25.1
2017–18†	Golden State	68	68	34.2	.516	.419	.889	6.8	5.4	.7	**1.8**	26.4
2018–19	Golden State	78	78	34.6	.521	.353	.885	6.4	5.9	.7	1.1	26.0
2020–21	Brooklyn	35	32	33.1	.537	.450	.882	7.1	5.6	.7	1.3	26.9
2021–22	Brooklyn	55	55	37.2	.518	.383	.910	7.4	**6.4**	.9	.9	29.9
2022–23	Brooklyn	39	39	36.0	.559	.376	**.934**	6.7	5.3	.8	1.5	29.7
2022–23	Phoenix	8	8	33.7	**.570**	**.537**	.833	6.4	3.5	.3	1.3	26.0
2023–24	Phoenix	75	75	37.2	.523	.413	.856	6.6	5.0	.9	1.2	27.1
2024–25	Phoenix	62	62	36.5	.527	.430	.839	6.0	4.2	.8	1.2	26.6
2025–26	Houston	78	78	36.4	.520	.413	.874	5.5	4.8	.8	.9	26.0
Career		1,201	1,198	36.7	.503	.392	.882	6.9	4.4	1.0	1.1	27.1
All-Star		13	10	26.1	.512	.343	.897	5.8	3.6	1.8	.5	21.8

==== Playoffs ====
Year	Team	GP	GS	MPG	FG%	3P%	FT%	RPG	APG	SPG	BPG	PPG
2010	Oklahoma City	6	6	38.5	.350	.286	.871	7.7	2.3	.5	1.3	25.0
2011	Oklahoma City	17	17	42.5	.449	.339	.838	8.2	2.8	.9	1.1	28.6
2012	Oklahoma City	20	20	41.8	.517	.373	.864	7.4	3.7	**1.5**	1.2	28.5
2013	Oklahoma City	11	11	**44.0**	.455	.314	.830	9.0	**6.3**	1.3	1.1	30.8
2014	Oklahoma City	19	19	42.9	.460	.344	.810	8.9	3.9	1.0	1.3	29.6
2016	Oklahoma City	18	18	40.3	.430	.282	.890	7.1	3.3	1.0	1.0	28.4
2017†	Golden State	15	15	35.5	.556	**.442**	.893	7.9	4.3	.8	1.3	28.5
2018†	Golden State	**21**	**21**	38.4	.487	.341	.901	7.8	4.7	.7	1.2	29.0
2019	Golden State	12	12	36.8	.514	.438	.903	4.9	4.5	1.1	1.0	32.3
2021	Brooklyn	12	12	40.4	.514	.402	.871	**9.3**	4.4	**1.5**	**1.6**	**34.3**
2022	Brooklyn	4	4	44.0	.386	.333	.895	5.8	**6.3**	1.0	.3	26.3
2023	Phoenix	11	11	42.3	.478	.333	**.917**	8.7	5.5	.8	1.4	29.0
2024	Phoenix	4	4	42.1	.552	.417	.824	6.5	3.3	.5	1.5	26.8
2026	Houston	1	1	41.0	**.583**	.250	.889	6.0	4.0	1.0	1.0	23.0
Career		171	171	40.5	.478	.355	.868	7.8	4.2	1.0	1.2	29.3

=== College ===
Year	Team	GP	GS	MPG	FG%	3P%	FT%	RPG	APG	SPG	BPG	PPG
2006–07	Texas	35	35	35.9	.473	.404	.816	11.1	1.3	1.9	1.9	25.8

== Awards and honors ==
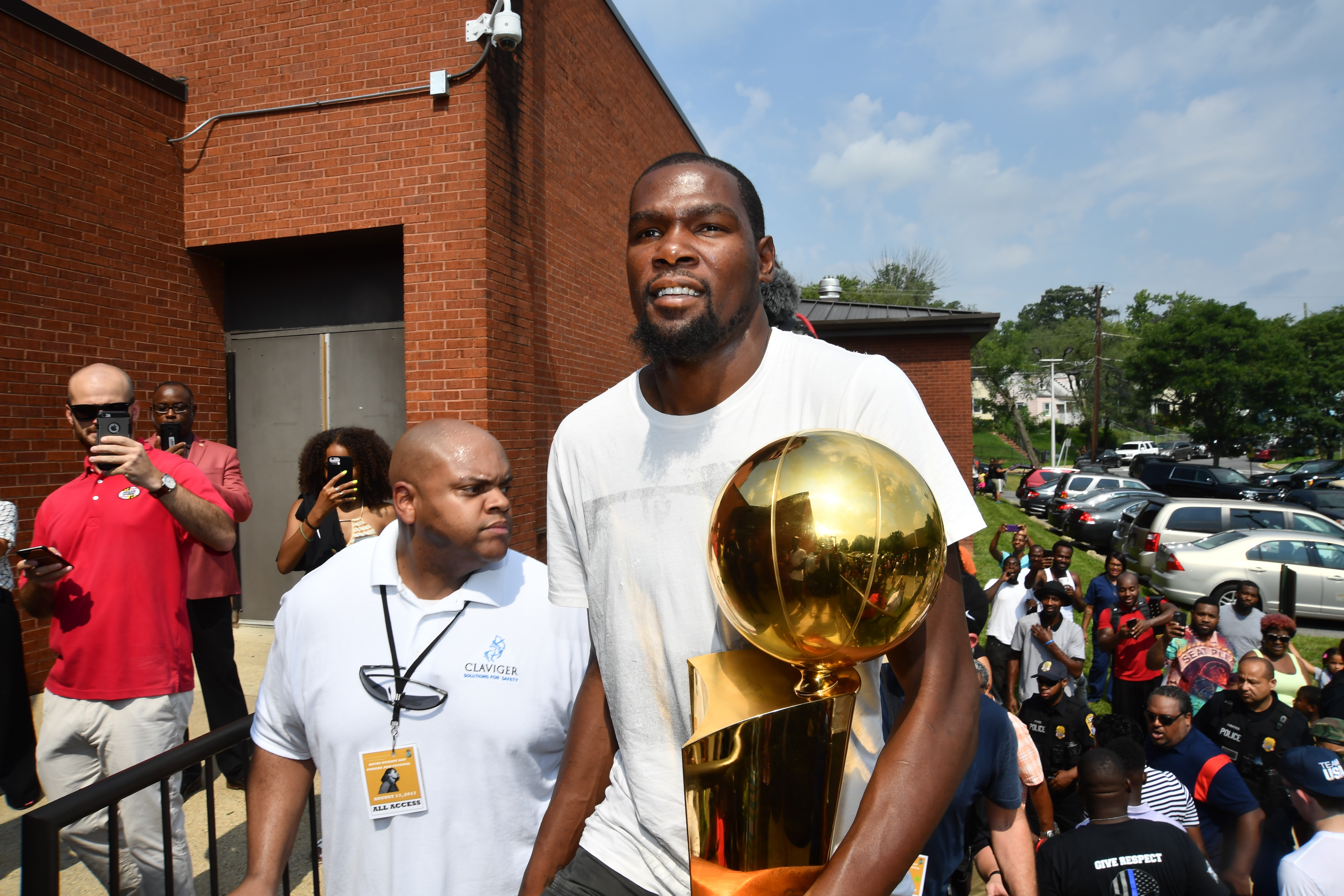
Durant with the 2018 NBA Finals trophy at the inaugural Kevin Durant Day in Seat Pleasant, Maryland

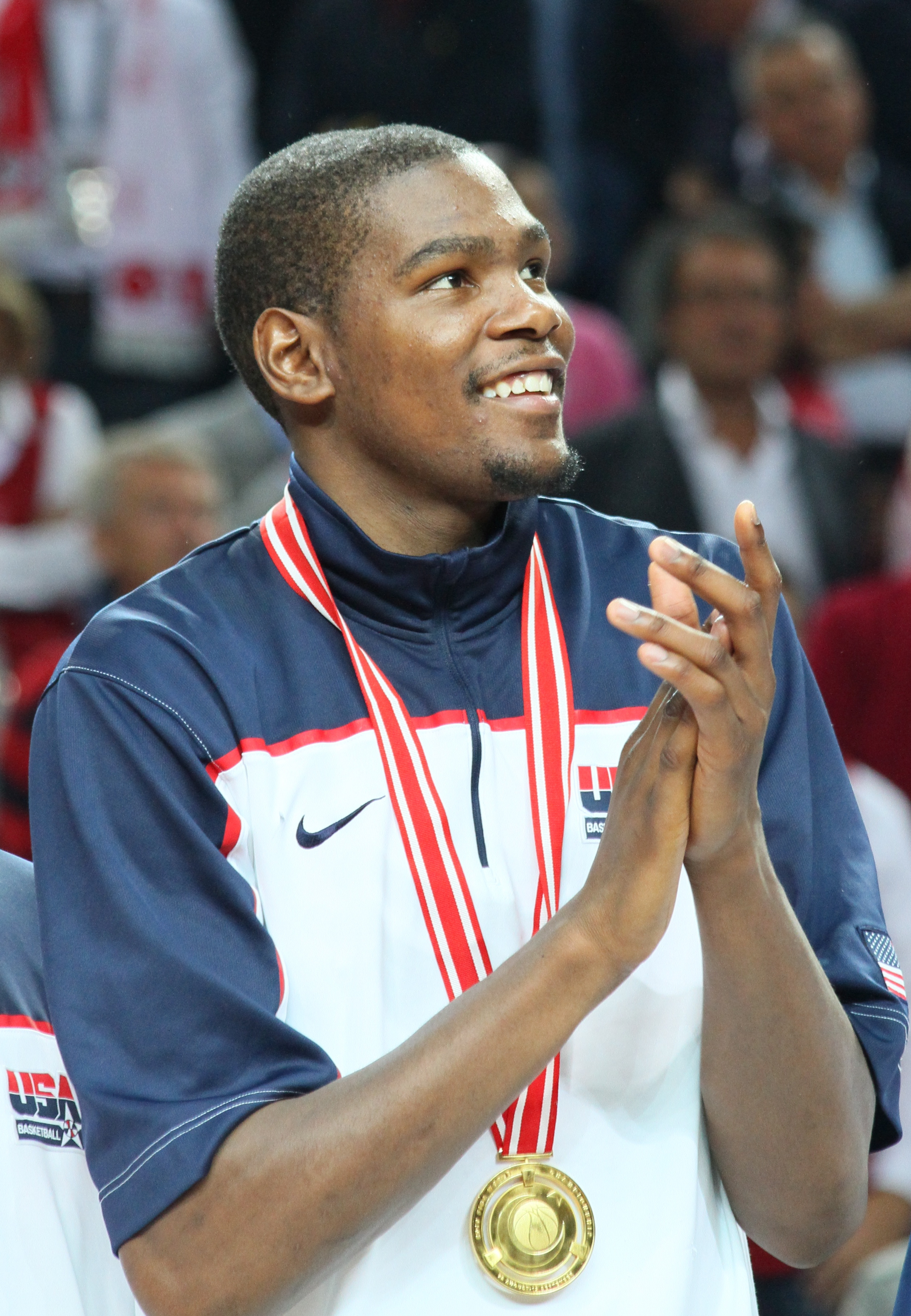
Durant with his gold medal at the 2010 FIBA World Championship in Turkey

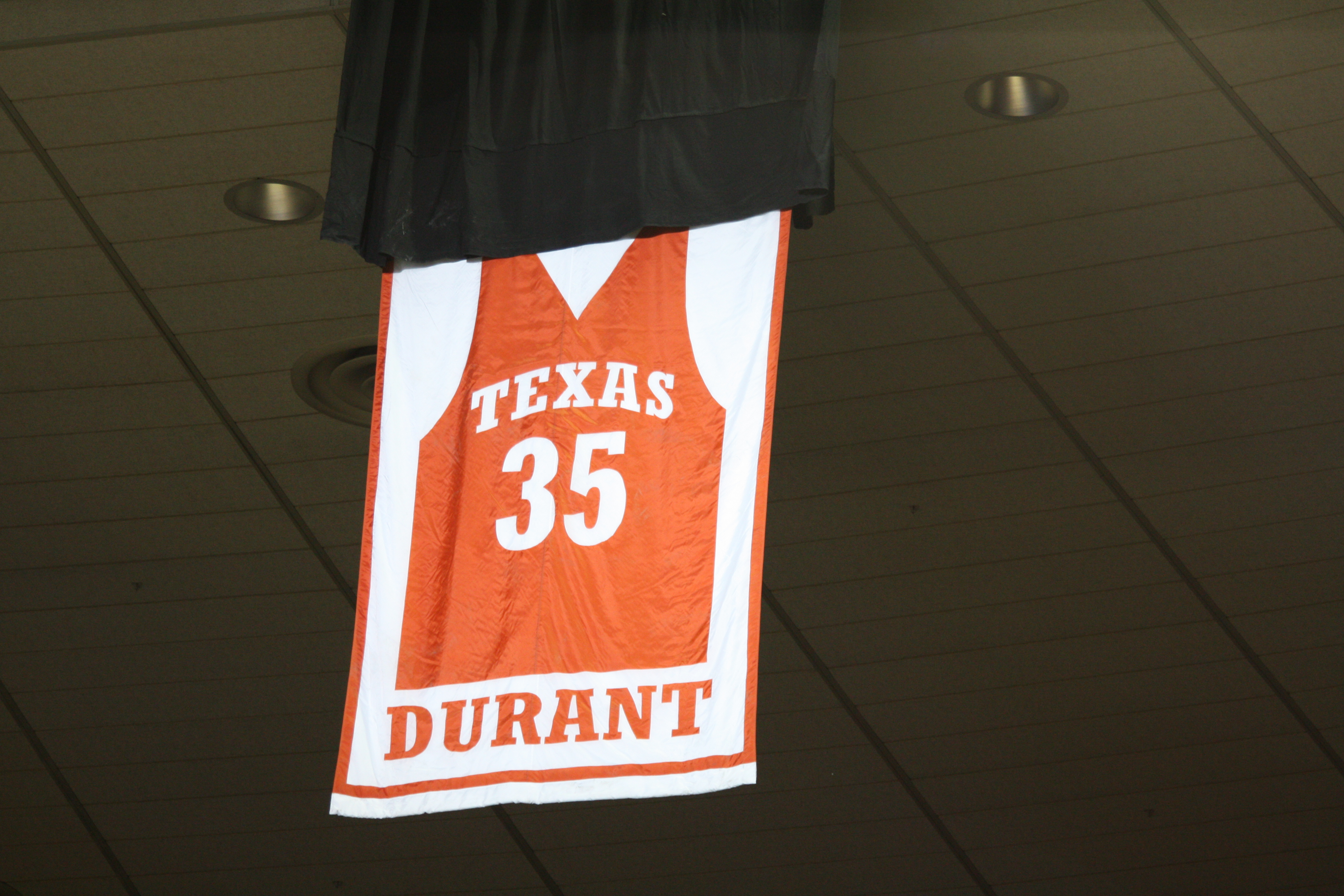
Durant's No. 35 jersey retired by Texas

NBA

Cited from Basketball Reference's Kevin Durant page unless noted otherwise.

- 2× NBA champion: 2017, 2018
- 2× NBA Finals Most Valuable Player: 2017, 2018
- NBA Most Valuable Player: 2014
- 16× NBA All-Star: 2010–2019, 2021–2026
- 12x All-NBA Team selections:
  - 6× First Team: 2010–2014, 2018
  - 6× Second Team: 2016, 2017, 2019, 2022, 2024, 2026
- 4× NBA scoring champion: 2010–2012, 2014
- 3× NBA free throw scoring leaders: 2010, 2011, 2014
- 2× NBA All-Star Game MVP: 2012, 2019
- 2× 50–40–90 club: 2013, 2023
- 2× NBA H–O–R–S–E Competition: 2009, 2010
- NBA Rookie of the Year: 2008
- NBA All-Rookie First Team: 2008
- Rising Stars Challenge MVP: 2009
- Magic Johnson Award: 2011, 2025

USA Basketball

Cited from USA Basketball's Kevin Durant page unless noted otherwise.

- 4× Olympic gold medalist: 2012, 2016, 2020, 2024
- Olympics Most Valuable Player: 2020
- Olympic All-Star Five: 2020
- FIBA Summer Olympics 1992–2020 Dream Team
- FIBA World Cup gold medalist: 2010
- FIBA World Cup Most Valuable Player: 2010
- FIBA Basketball World Cup All-Tournament Team: 2010
- 3× USA Basketball Male Athlete of the Year: 2010, 2016, 2021

NCAA

- Naismith College Player of the Year: 2007
- NABC Division I Player of the Year: 2007
- Oscar Robertson Trophy: 2007
- Adolph Rupp Trophy: 2007
- John R. Wooden Award: 2007
- Big 12 Player of the Year: 2007
- USBWA National Freshman of the Year: 2007
- Jersey number (35) retired at Texas

Media

- Best Male Athlete ESPY Award: 2014
- Best NBA Player ESPY Award: 2014
- AP Player of the Year: 2007
- AP All-America 1st Team: 2007

== Filmography ==
=== Film ===
Year	Title	Role	Notes
2012	Thunderstruck	Himself	

=== Television ===
Year	Title	Role	Notes
2025	Speed Goes Pro	Himself	Guest appearance in the IShowSpeed YouTube series

== See also ==
- List of NBA career scoring leaders
- List of NBA career blocks leaders
- List of NBA career 3-point scoring leaders
- List of NBA career free throw percentage leaders
- List of NBA career free throw scoring leaders
- List of NBA seasons played leaders
- List of NBA career minutes played leaders
- List of NBA career games played leaders
- List of NBA career playoff scoring leaders
- List of NBA career playoff blocks leaders
- List of NBA career playoff turnovers leaders
- List of NBA career playoff 3-point scoring leaders
- List of NBA career playoff free throw scoring leaders
- List of NBA career playoff games played leaders
- List of NBA career playoff minutes leaders
- List of NBA single-game playoff scoring leaders
- List of NBA annual scoring leaders
- List of NBA annual free throw percentage leaders
