= Rich Kleiman =

American businessperson

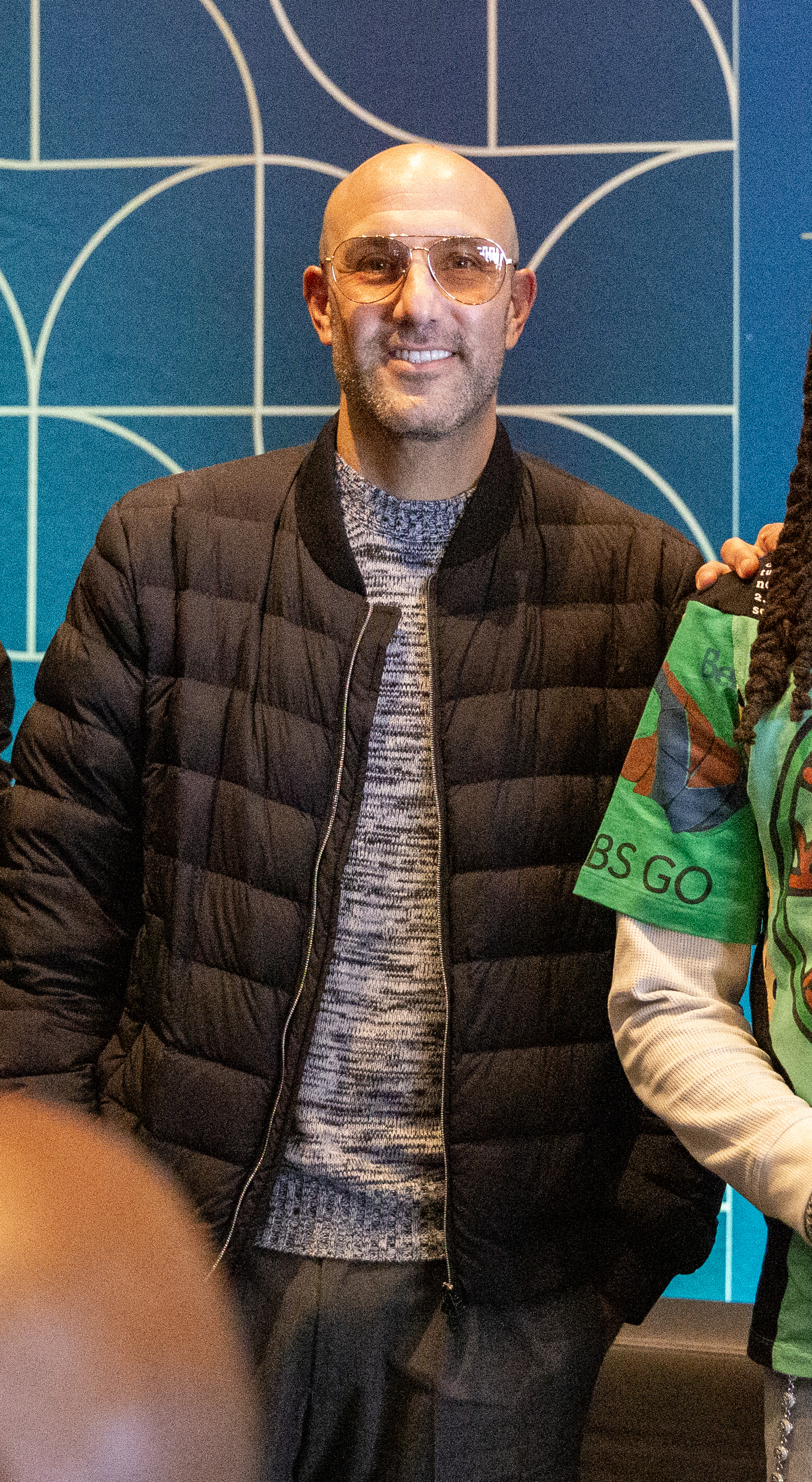
- Kleiman in 2025
- Born: November 27, 1976 (age 49)
- Known for: Agent of Kevin Durant; Co-founder of Boardroom
- Spouse: Jana Gold Kleiman

Rich Kleiman (born November 27, 1976) is an American entrepreneur. He is best known as Kevin Durant’s longtime agent and business partner. Kleiman and Durant founded the sports business media network Boardroom and 35V (Thirty Five Ventures), Durant's family office and personal deals business. Forbes has called Kleiman a visionary with an "established track records in starting companies, investing in emerging brands and in disrupting existing markets."

== Early life and work ==
After growing up on the Upper West Side in Manhattan, New York, Kleiman enrolled at Boston University before dropping out after one semester. Kleiman lived in Boston for 2 years, working as a bookie, then spent a year in Boca Raton, Florida.

== Career ==
=== Music industry ===
Kleiman entered the music industry in 1998 as a partner in OneLevel.com, a hip-hop community commerce website. Kleiman led marketing and built relationships with celebrities such as Robert De Niro, Heavy D, and Q-Tip. During this time, Kleiman began a professional relationship with British DJ Mark Ronson, then relatively unknown. When Ronson was given his own label imprint under Elektra Records in 2003, he asked Kleiman, by then his manager, to manage the business side. Ronson and Kleiman together launched Allido Records, and had clients including Wale, Rhymefest, Saigon, and Daniel Merriweather. The pair also opened a studio in the SoHo neighborhood of New York City. Artists including Amy Winehouse and J Cole recorded at the studio.

Through John Meneilly, Kleiman met Jay-Z, and went on to produce the rapper's Fade To Black documentary in 2004. Kleiman connected Wale and Jay-Z, and Wale credited Kleiman with his decision to drop out of school and pursue his music career. Kleiman joined Jay-Z's Roc Nation in 2008. At Roc Nation, Kleiman managed artists such as Wale, Meek Mill, DJ Nice, and Solange.

=== Roc Nation Sports ===
In 2008, Wale introduced Kleiman to a then 19-year old Kevin Durant, who had recently won the NBA Rookie of the Year Award, at a Jay-Z concert at Madison Square Garden. Kleiman officially became Durant's agent and manager in 2012. Kleiman played an integral role in the launch of Roc Nation Sports in 2013, and served as the unit's vice president.

At Roc Nation Sports, Kleiman also worked with athletes such as Victor Cruz, CC Sabathia, Skylar Diggins-Smith and Robinson Canó. Kleiman's career in entertainment began at Radical Media, where he was a music supervisor.

=== Boardroom ===
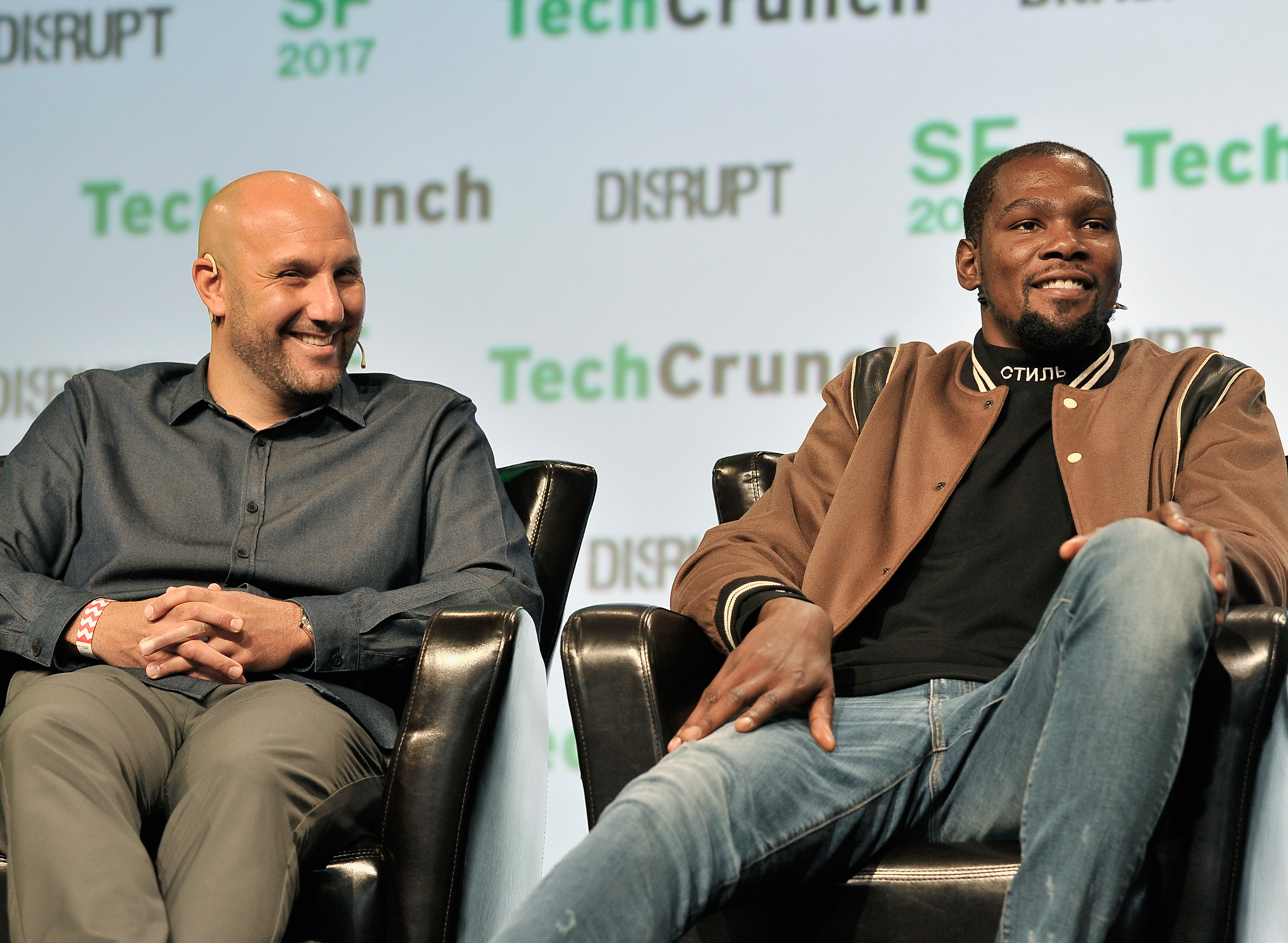
Kleiman and Durant in 2017

In 2019, Kleiman and Durant launched Boardroom, a media network that covers the business of sports and entertainment. It includes editorial, video, social media content, daily newsletters and podcasts by Kleiman and Durant. Boardroom's sister company is Boardroom Sports Holdings which works to invest in emerging sports teams such as Philadelphia Union and Gotham FC, as well as sports leagues including Premier Lacrosse League and Athletes Unlimited Volleyball.

Kleiman and Durant media projects under the Boardroom umbrella include the Academy Award-winning Two Distant Strangers (Netflix), the scripted series Swagger (by Apple TV+) and the 2022 Showtime documentary NYC Point Gods.

Kleiman also co-founded 35V (Thirty Five Ventures), Durant's family office and personal deals business.

== Personal life ==
Kleiman married Jana Ilyse Gold in November 2003. They have two children. Mark Ronson, Kleiman's long-time friend, is the godfather to one of Kleiman's children. Kleiman's family resides on the Upper West Side in Manhattan.
