= Mike Levine (sports executive) =

American sports agent

Michael "Vino" Levine
- Education: Cornell University
- Occupation: Sports business executive
- Organization: CAA Sports
- Spouse: Alyson
- Children: 3

Michael Levine, known by his nickname Vino, is an American sports agent and executive known for being co-head of CAA Sports, the sports division of Creative Artists Agency (CAA). He has been ranked as one of the most influential people in sports by Worth and Sports Business Journal.

== Career ==
Michael Levine was the president of Van Wagner Sports Group from 2002 until 2007. Levine had previously worked with SFX Sports Group, Marquee Group and Sportscapsule, Inc. In 2007, he was on the inaugural advisory board of the Tribeca/ESPN Sports Film Festival.

Levine has been co-head of CAA Sports, a division of CAA which handles sports properties, athlete representation and licensing, since it was founded in 2007. Under Levine, CAA signed athletes from the NFL, MLB, NBA and NHL, and began a foray into European football in 2008.

Under Levine, CAA Sports negotiated high-profile deals with stadiums and arenas, and launched CAA ICON, an owner's representative and management consulting firm in 2017.

In January 2020, Levine was appointed to the CAA Board, which was created in 2020 to manage the daily operations of CAA.

== Awards and recognition ==
Levine was ranked 10th in Worth's 50 Most Powerful People in Sports, and ranked on Sports Business Journal’s list of 50 Most Influential People in Sports Business every year from 2008 to 2019. He was named to the Sports Business Journal 40 Under 40 lists in 2006, 2007, and 2008. In 2008, he was inducted into the Sports Business Journal Hall of Fame.

In 2013, Levine was the recipient of the Honoree of Year Award from UJA-Federation of New York’s Sports for Youth.

== Nonprofit work ==
Levine is on the National Advisory Board of One Love, a non-profit organization which educates young people about healthy relationships, and increase awareness of how to identify and avoid abuse. He is also a member of the Advisory Board of Harlem Academy and the Executive Committee of the UJA-Federation of New York's Sports for Youth Board, and founding member of the Fred Gabler Helping Hand Camp Fund.

== Personal life ==
Levine graduated from Cornell University with a B.A. in History. While at Cornell, he was an Academic All-Ivy contributor and led the Cornell Big Red men's lacrosse team. He serves as a member of the Cornell Athletic Alumni Advisory Council (CAAAC). Levine was a keynote speaker at the inaugural Cornell Sports Leadership Summit in 2017, hosted by the ILR School. The following year, he appeared on stage with NHL Commissioner Gary Bettman and ESPN’s Jeremy Schaap.

He is married with three children and resides in Westchester County, New York.
