= Basketball at the 2024 Summer Olympics – Men's qualification =

The men's qualification for the Olympic basketball tournament occurred between August 2023 and 2024, allocating twelve teams for the final tournament. All five FIBA (International Basketball Federation) zones were expected to have a representation in the Olympic basketball event.

As the host nation, France reserved a quota place in the men's 5×5 basketball; this was confirmed by a FIBA Central Board decision on 30 April 2023. The 2023 FIBA Basketball World Cup produced seven directly qualified national teams for Paris 2024. The last four quota places were assigned to the winners of separate wild card tournaments.

== Method ==
Twelve teams will participate in the men's basketball tournament, with each NOC sending a roster of 12 players.

=== Host nation ===
As the host nation, France reserved a direct quota place in the men's basketball subject to the FIBA Central Board decision originally to be made on 30 June 2023. Their automatic qualification was confirmed by the FIBA Central Board decision on 30 April 2023.

=== Qualification via World Cup ===
Similar to the 2019 format, the 2023 FIBA Basketball World Cup distributed seven quota places to the best teams from respective continents based on the final classification as follows:

- FIBA Africa – 1 team
- FIBA Americas – 2 teams
- FIBA Asia – 1 team
- FIBA Europe – 2 teams
- FIBA Oceania – 1 team

=== Qualification via the wild card tournament ===
The four remaining quota places were attributed to the 12-team field through the two-round FIBA World Olympic Qualifying Tournaments. The first rounds, the FIBA Olympic pre-qualifying tournaments (FOPQTs), were played at the continental level and the second, the FIBA Olympic qualifying tournaments (FOQTs), at the global level.

==== Participation in the FIBA Olympic pre-qualifying tournaments ====
Forty teams that failed to qualify for the 2023 FIBA Basketball World Cup were eligible to participate in the FOPQTs. For each continent, teams were selected by competing in the second round of 2023 FIBA Basketball World Cup qualification and by certain qualification or ranking criteria among those that did not play in the second round.

- FIBA Africa – 8 teams: 7 teams eliminated from the second round of the African qualifiers for the 2023 FIBA Basketball World Cup, along with the highest-ranked team by FIBA ranking that did not play in the second round.
- FIBA Americas – 8 teams: 5 teams eliminated from the second round of the Americas qualifiers for the 2023 FIBA Basketball World Cup, along with three of the highest-ranked teams by FIBA ranking that did not play in the second round.
- FIBA Asia and FIBA Oceania – 8 teams: 4 teams eliminated from the second round of the Asia and Oceania qualifiers for the 2023 FIBA Basketball World Cup, along with the four teams eliminated from the first round
- FIBA Europe – 16 teams: 12 teams eliminated from the second round of the European qualifiers for the 2023 FIBA Basketball World Cup, along with the four teams advanced from the second round of EuroBasket 2025 pre-qualifiers to qualifiers.

From the Africa, Americas, and Asia tournaments, the winner advanced to the FOQTs, while two teams from European FOPQTs clinched their spot at FOQTs.

==== Participation in the FIBA Olympic Qualifying Tournaments ====
Twenty-four teams participated in four tournaments with winners earning the last four berths at the Olympics. Along with the five teams advanced from FOPQTs, 19 teams were selected based on their performance at 2023 FIBA Basketball World Cup:

- FIBA Africa – the highest-ranked team from Africa at the World Cup apart from direct qualifiers
- FIBA Americas – the highest-ranked team from the Americas at the World Cup apart from direct qualifiers
- FIBA Asia and FIBA Oceania – the highest-ranked team from Asia/Oceania at the World Cup apart from direct qualifiers
- The next sixteen best-placed teams not directly qualified for the Olympics

== Qualified teams ==
Qualification method		Date	Venue	Berths	Qualified team
Host nation		—N/a	—N/a	1	France
2023 FIBA Basketball World Cup	Africa	25 August – 10 September 2023	Philippines; Indonesia; Japan	1	South Sudan
2023 FIBA Basketball World Cup	Americas	25 August – 10 September 2023	Philippines; Indonesia; Japan	2	Canada
2023 FIBA Basketball World Cup	Americas	25 August – 10 September 2023	Philippines; Indonesia; Japan	2	United States
2023 FIBA Basketball World Cup	Asia	25 August – 10 September 2023	Philippines; Indonesia; Japan	1	Japan
2023 FIBA Basketball World Cup	Europe	25 August – 10 September 2023	Philippines; Indonesia; Japan	2	Germany
2023 FIBA Basketball World Cup	Europe	25 August – 10 September 2023	Philippines; Indonesia; Japan	2	Serbia
2023 FIBA Basketball World Cup	Oceania	25 August – 10 September 2023	Philippines; Indonesia; Japan	1	Australia
2024 FIBA Men's Olympic Qualifying Tournaments		2–7 July 2024	(Spain) Valencia	1	Spain
2024 FIBA Men's Olympic Qualifying Tournaments		2–7 July 2024	(Latvia) Riga	1	Brazil
2024 FIBA Men's Olympic Qualifying Tournaments		2–7 July 2024	(Greece) Piraeus	1	Greece
2024 FIBA Men's Olympic Qualifying Tournaments		2–7 July 2024	(Puerto Rico) San Juan	1	Puerto Rico
Total				12	

== Qualification via 2023 FIBA Basketball World Cup ranking ==
Final standing by FIBA zone

Qualify for the 2024 Summer Olympics via sub-zone rank
Qualify for the 2024 FIBA World Olympic Qualifying Tournament
Qualify for the 2024 Summer Olympics as the host country

#	FIBA Africa (1/5 teams)		FIBA Americas (2/7 teams)		FIBA Asia (1/6 teams)		FIBA Europe (2/12 teams)		FIBA Oceania (1/2 teams)	
#	Team	W–L	Team	W–L	Team	W–L	Team	W–L	Team	W–L
1	South Sudan	3–2	Canada	6–2	Japan	3–2	Germany	8–0	Australia	3–2
2	Egypt	2–3	United States	5–3	Lebanon	2–3	Serbia	6–2	New Zealand	2–3
3	Angola	1–4	Puerto Rico	3–2	Philippines	1–4	Latvia	6–2		
4	Ivory Coast	1–4	Brazil	3–2	China	1–4	Lithuania	6–2		
5	Cape Verde	1–4	Dominican Republic	3–2	Iran	0–5	Slovenia	5–3		
6			Mexico	2–3	Jordan	0–5	Italy	4–4		
7			Venezuela	0–5			Spain	3–2		
8							Montenegro	3–2		
9							Greece	2–3		
10							Georgia	2–3		
11							France	3–2		
12							Finland	2–3		

== FIBA Olympic Qualifying Tournaments ==
Qualification method	Places	Qualified team
2023 FIBA Basketball World Cup
Highest-ranked eligible team – Africa	1	Egypt
Highest-ranked eligible team – Americas	1	Puerto Rico
Highest-ranked eligible team – Asia and Oceania	1	New Zealand
Top 16 eligible teams	16	Latvia
Top 16 eligible teams	16	Lithuania
Top 16 eligible teams	16	Slovenia
Top 16 eligible teams	16	Italy
Top 16 eligible teams	16	Spain
Top 16 eligible teams	16	Montenegro
Top 16 eligible teams	16	Brazil
Top 16 eligible teams	16	Dominican Republic
Top 16 eligible teams	16	Greece
Top 16 eligible teams	16	Georgia
Top 16 eligible teams	16	Finland
Top 16 eligible teams	16	Lebanon
Top 16 eligible teams	16	Philippines
Top 16 eligible teams	16	Mexico
Top 16 eligible teams	16	Angola
Top 16 eligible teams	16	Ivory Coast
2023 FIBA Olympic Pre-Qualifying Tournaments (OPQT)
Winner – FIBA Africa	1	Cameroon
Winner – FIBA Americas	1	Bahamas
Winner – FIBA Asia	1	Bahrain
Winner – FIBA Europe (OPQT1)	1	Poland
Winner – FIBA Europe (OPQT2)	1	Croatia
Total	24	

== FIBA Olympic Pre-Qualifying Tournaments ==
The tournaments were held from 12 to 20 August 2023. The draw took place on 1 May 2023. The host cities and seedings were announced on 29 April 2023.

=== FIBA Africa ===
Qualification method		Places	Qualified team
2023 FIBA World Cup Qualifiers – Africa	Third (worst-ranked)	1	Senegal
2023 FIBA World Cup Qualifiers – Africa	Fourth	2	Nigeria
2023 FIBA World Cup Qualifiers – Africa	Fourth	2	Tunisia
2023 FIBA World Cup Qualifiers – Africa	Fifth	2	Guinea
2023 FIBA World Cup Qualifiers – Africa	Fifth	2	~~DR Congo~~
2023 FIBA World Cup Qualifiers – Africa	Sixth	2	~~Uganda~~
2023 FIBA World Cup Qualifiers – Africa	Sixth	2	Cameroon
FIBA World Rankings – Africa (November 2022)		1	Mali
Total		8	

=== FIBA Asia and Oceania ===
Qualification method		Places	Qualified team
2023 FIBA World Cup Qualifiers – Asia	Round 2 – Fifth	2	Saudi Arabia
2023 FIBA World Cup Qualifiers – Asia	Round 2 – Fifth	2	Kazakhstan
2023 FIBA World Cup Qualifiers – Asia	Round 2 – Sixth	2	India
2023 FIBA World Cup Qualifiers – Asia	Round 2 – Sixth	2	Bahrain
2023 FIBA World Cup Qualifiers – Asia	Round 1 – Fourth	4	~~South Korea~~
2023 FIBA World Cup Qualifiers – Asia	Round 1 – Fourth	4	~~Chinese Taipei~~
2023 FIBA World Cup Qualifiers – Asia	Round 1 – Fourth	4	Indonesia
2023 FIBA World Cup Qualifiers – Asia	Round 1 – Fourth	4	Syria
Total		8	

=== FIBA Americas ===
Qualification method		Places	Qualified team
2023 FIBA World Cup Qualifiers – Americas	Fourth (worst-ranked)	1	Argentina
2023 FIBA World Cup Qualifiers – Americas	Fifth	2	~~Panama~~
2023 FIBA World Cup Qualifiers – Americas	Fifth	2	Uruguay
2023 FIBA World Cup Qualifiers – Americas	Sixth	2	Bahamas
2023 FIBA World Cup Qualifiers – Americas	Sixth	2	Colombia
FIBA World Rankings – Americas (November 2022)		3	Virgin Islands
FIBA World Rankings – Americas (November 2022)		3	Chile
FIBA World Rankings – Americas (November 2022)		3	Cuba
Total		8	

=== FIBA Europe ===
Qualification method		Places	Qualified team
2023 FIBA World Cup Qualifiers – Europe	Fourth	4	Turkey
2023 FIBA World Cup Qualifiers – Europe	Fourth	4	Sweden
2023 FIBA World Cup Qualifiers – Europe	Fourth	4	Hungary
2023 FIBA World Cup Qualifiers – Europe	Fourth	4	Iceland
2023 FIBA World Cup Qualifiers – Europe	Fifth	4	Belgium
2023 FIBA World Cup Qualifiers – Europe	Fifth	4	Israel
2023 FIBA World Cup Qualifiers – Europe	Fifth	4	Bosnia and Herzegovina
2023 FIBA World Cup Qualifiers – Europe	Fifth	4	Ukraine
2023 FIBA World Cup Qualifiers – Europe	Sixth	4	~~Great Britain (Note: Great Britain withdrew before the start of the tournament.)~~
2023 FIBA World Cup Qualifiers – Europe	Sixth	4	Estonia
2023 FIBA World Cup Qualifiers – Europe	Sixth	4	Czech Republic
2023 FIBA World Cup Qualifiers – Europe	Sixth	4	Netherlands
EuroBasket 2025 Pre-Qualifiers	First	3	North Macedonia
EuroBasket 2025 Pre-Qualifiers	First	3	Poland
EuroBasket 2025 Pre-Qualifiers	First	3	Portugal
Reallocation of unused quota		1	Croatia
FIBA World Rankings – Europe (November 2022)		1	Bulgaria (Note: With a final decision made to decline Russia's entry in April because of the Russian invasion of Ukraine, Bulgaria was the next highest-ranked European team.)
Total		16	
