= 2024 FIBA Men's Olympic Qualifying Tournaments – Riga =

2024 FIBA World Olympic Qualifying Tournament for Men
Tournament details
- Host country: Latvia
- City: Riga
- Dates: 2–7 July
- Teams: 6
- Venue(s): 1 (in 1 host city)

Final positions
- Champions: Brazil
- Runners-up: Latvia
- Third place: Philippines
- Fourth place: Cameroon

Tournament statistics
- Games played: 9
- Attendance: 40,127 (4,459 per game)
- MVP: (Brazil) Bruno Caboclo
- Top scorer: (Philippines) Justin Brownlee (23.0 ppg)

Official website
- Website

The 2024 FIBA Men's Olympic Qualifying Tournament in Riga was one of four 2024 FIBA Men's Olympic Qualifying Tournaments. The tournament was held at Riga, Latvia, from 2 to 7 July 2024. Six teams participated in two groups of three teams, where the first-and second-placed teams advanced to the semifinals. The winner of the tournament qualified for the 2024 Summer Olympics.

Brazil won the tournament after defeating Latvia in the final.

== Teams ==
| Team | Qualification | Date of qualification | WR |
|---|---|---|---|
| Latvia | One of top 16 eligible teams | 10 September 2023 | 6 |
| Brazil | One of top 16 eligible teams | 10 September 2023 | 12 |
| Montenegro | One of top 16 eligible teams | 10 September 2023 | 17 |
| Georgia | One of top 16 eligible teams | 10 September 2023 | 23 |
| Philippines | One of top 16 eligible teams | 10 September 2023 | 37 |
| Cameroon | Winner of 2024 African Pre-Qualifying Tournament | 20 August 2023 | 68 |

== Venue ==
| Riga | 2024 FIBA Men's Olympic Qualifying Tournaments – Riga (Latvia) |
| Arena Riga | 2024 FIBA Men's Olympic Qualifying Tournaments – Riga (Latvia) |
| Capacity: 11,200 | 2024 FIBA Men's Olympic Qualifying Tournaments – Riga (Latvia) |

== Preliminary round ==
All times are local (UTC+3).

=== Group A ===
| Pos | Team | Pld | W | L | PF | PA | PD | Pts | Qualification |
|---|---|---|---|---|---|---|---|---|---|
| 1 | Latvia (H) | 2 | 1 | 1 | 163 | 144 | +19 | 3 | Semi-finals |
| 2 | Philippines | 2 | 1 | 1 | 183 | 176 | +7 | 3 | Semi-finals |
| 3 | Georgia | 2 | 1 | 1 | 151 | 177 | −26 | 3 | |

Source: FIBA
(H) Hosts

2 July 2024
19:00

Boxscore

| Georgia | 55–83 | Latvia |
Scoring by quarter: 13–17, 11–28, 17–13, 14–25
| Pts: Mamukelashvili 14; Rebs: Bitadze 6 Asts: three players 2 | | Pts: Strautiņš 18; Rebs: Mejeris, Šmits 7 Asts: Žagars 6 |

Arena Riga, Riga
Attendance: 8,955
Referees: Omar Bermúdez (MEX), Wojciech Liszka (POL), Luis Castillo (ESP)

3 July 2024
19:00

Boxscore

| Latvia | 80–89 | Philippines |
Scoring by quarter: 16–32, 22–22, 18–23, 24–12
| Pts: Rodions 18; Rebs: Rodions 7 Asts: Strēlnieks, Zoriks 5 | | Pts: Brownlee 26; Rebs: Brownlee 9 Asts: Brownlee 9 |

Arena Riga, Riga
Attendance: 8,835
Referees: Ademir Zurapović (BIH), Wojciech Liszka (POL), Kerem Baki (TUR)

4 July 2024
15:30

Boxscore

| Philippines | 94–96 | Georgia |
Scoring by quarter: 17–28, 26–27, 31–19, 20–22
| Pts: Brownlee 28; Rebs: Brownlee 8 Asts: Brownlee 8 | | Pts: Mamukelashvili 26; Rebs: Bitadze 11; Asts: Thomasson 8 |

Arena Riga, Riga
Attendance: 531
Referees: Ademir Zurapović (BIH), Omar Bermúdez (MEX), Kerem Baki (TUR)

=== Group B ===
| Pos | Team | Pld | W | L | PF | PA | PD | Pts | Qualification |
|---|---|---|---|---|---|---|---|---|---|
| 1 | Brazil | 2 | 1 | 1 | 155 | 149 | +6 | 3 | Semi-finals |
| 2 | Cameroon | 2 | 1 | 1 | 143 | 144 | −1 | 3 | Semi-finals |
| 3 | Montenegro | 2 | 1 | 1 | 142 | 147 | −5 | 3 | |

Source: FIBA

2 July 2024
15:30

Boxscore

| Brazil | 81–72 | Montenegro |
Scoring by quarter: 15–23, 21–19, 16–14, 29–16
| Pts: Caboclo 25; Rebs: Caboclo 9 Asts: Yago 5 | | Pts: Vučević 17; Rebs: Vučević 13; Asts: Perry, Simonović 3 |

Arena Riga, Riga
Attendance: 1,022
Referees: Ademir Zurapović (BIH), Takaki Kato (JPN), Jenna Jordan Reneau (USA)

3 July 2024
15:30

Boxscore

| Montenegro | 70–66 | Cameroon |
Scoring by quarter: 16–13, 13–19, 20–10, 21–24
| Pts: Simonović 18; Rebs: Vučević 14; Asts: Perry, Popović 5 | | Pts: Ateba, Bayehe 14; Rebs: Eyaga Bidias 6 Asts: Hill 10 |

Arena Riga, Riga
Attendance: 622
Referees: Luis Castillo (ESP), Omar Bermúdez (MEX), Wael Mostafa (EGY)

4 July 2024
19:00

Boxscore

| Cameroon | 77–74 | Brazil |
Scoring by quarter: 29–27, 27–12, 12–16, 9–19
| Pts: Hill 22; Rebs: Hill 6 Asts: Hill 6 | | Pts: Meindl 19; Rebs: Dias, Yago 6 Asts: Huertas, Yago 7 |

Arena Riga, Riga
Attendance: 656
Referees: Takaki Kato (JPN), Wojciech Liszka (POL), Jenna Jordan Reneau (USA)

== Final round ==
Semi-finals
6 July
Cameroon | 59
Latvia | 72
6 July
Brazil | 71
Philippines | 60

Final
7 July
Latvia | 69
Brazil | 94

=== Semi-finals ===
6 July 2024
15:30

Boxscore

| Brazil | 71–60 | Philippines |
Scoring by quarter: 12–22, 15–11, 24–6, 20–21
| Pts: Caboclo 15; Rebs: Caboclo 11; Asts: Huertas 7 | | Pts: Brownlee 15; Rebs: Fajardo 10; Asts: Ramos 3 |

Arena Riga, Riga
Attendance: 837
Referees: Omar Bermúdez (MEX), Wojciech Liszka (POL), Kerem Baki (TUR)

6 July 2024
19:00

Boxscore

| Cameroon | 59–72 | Latvia |
Scoring by quarter: 19–23, 16–15, 15–15, 9–19
| Pts: Narace 14; Rebs: Bayehe, Choh 7 Asts: Hill 3 | | Pts: Lomažs 20; Rebs: Mejeris 10; Asts: Žagars 5 |

Arena Riga, Riga
Attendance: 9,329
Referees: Ademir Zurapović (BIH), Luis Castillo (ESP), Takaki Kato (JPN)

=== Final ===
7 July 2024
19:00

Boxscore

| Latvia | 69–94 | Brazil |
Scoring by quarter: 11–34, 22–15, 13–23, 23–22
| Pts: Lomažs 15; Rebs: Mejeris 6 Asts: Žagars 4 | | Pts: Caboclo 21; Rebs: Meindl 9 Asts: Huertas 7 |

Arena Riga, Riga
Attendance: 9,430
Referees: Omar Bermúdez (MEX), Wojciech Liszka (POL), Luis Castillo (ESP)

== Final ranking ==
| Pos | Team | Pld | W | L | Qualification |
|---|---|---|---|---|---|
| 1 | Brazil | 4 | 3 | 1 | Qualified for the Olympics |
| 2 | Latvia | 4 | 2 | 2 | |
| 3 | Philippines | 3 | 1 | 2 | |
| 4 | Cameroon | 3 | 1 | 2 | |
| 5 | Montenegro | 2 | 1 | 1 | |
| 6 | Georgia | 2 | 1 | 1 | |

Source: FIBA

== Statistics and awards ==
=== Statistical leaders ===
Players

Points

| Name | PPG |
|---|---|
| (Philippines) Justin Brownlee | 23.0 |
| (Georgia (country)) Sandro Mamukelashvili | 20.0 |
| (Brazil) Bruno Caboclo | 17.8 |
| (Montenegro) Marko Simonović | 16.5 |
| three players | 14.0 |

Rebounds

| Name | RPG |
|---|---|
| (Montenegro) Nikola Vučević | 13.5 |
| (Georgia (country)) Goga Bitadze | 8.5 |
| (Philippines) Justin Brownlee | 8.3 |
| (Philippines) June Mar Fajardo | 7.3 |
| (Brazil) Bruno Caboclo | 7.0 |

Assists

| Name | APG |
|---|---|
| (Cameroon) Jeremiah Hill | 6.3 |
| (Philippines) Justin Brownlee | 6.3 |
| (Brazil) Marcelo Huertas | 5.3 |
| (Georgia (country)) Joe Thomasson | 5.0 |
| (Latvia) Artūrs Žagars | 5.0 |

Blocks

| Name | BPG |
|---|---|
| (Georgia (country)) Goga Bitadze | 3.0 |
| (Brazil) Bruno Caboclo | 2.0 |
| (Cameroon) Brice Eyaga Bidias | 1.7 |
| (Philippines) Kai Sotto | 1.5 |
| (Latvia) Dāvis Bertāns | 1.0 |
| (Philippines) Japeth Aguilar | 1.0 |

Steals

| Name | SPG |
|---|---|
| (Georgia (country)) Rati Andronikashvili | 1.5 |
| (Georgia (country)) Sandro Mamukelashvili | 1.5 |
| (Georgia (country)) Giorgi Ochkhikidze | 1.5 |
| (Georgia (country)) Joe Thomasson | 1.5 |
| (Montenegro) Kendrick Perry | 1.5 |
| (Montenegro) Nikola Vučević | 1.5 |

Efficiency

| Name | EFFPG |
|---|---|
| (Philippines) Justin Brownlee | 27.0 |
| (Brazil) Bruno Caboclo | 22.5 |
| (Georgia (country)) Goga Bitadze | 22.5 |
| (Georgia (country)) Sandro Mamukelashvili | 20.0 |
| (Montenegro) Nikola Vučević | 20.0 |

==== Teams ====
Points

| Team | PPG |
|---|---|
| Philippines | 81.0 |
| Brazil | 80.0 |
| Latvia | 76.0 |
| Georgia | 75.5 |
| Montenegro | 71.0 |

Rebounds

| Team | RPG |
|---|---|
| Montenegro | 44.5 |
| Philippines | 39.7 |
| Brazil | 39.0 |
| Cameroon | 37.7 |
| Latvia | 36.5 |

Assists

| Team | APG |
|---|---|
| Georgia | 19.0 |
| Latvia | 18.5 |
| Montenegro | 18.0 |
| Philippines | 18.0 |
| Brazil | 17.3 |

Blocks

| Team | BPG |
|---|---|
| Brazil | 3.8 |
| Philippines | 3.7 |
| Georgia | 3.5 |
| Cameroon | 3.3 |
| Latvia | 2.8 |

Steals

| Team | SPG |
|---|---|
| Brazil | 7.0 |
| Georgia | 7.0 |
| Cameroon | 6.7 |
| Montenegro | 6.5 |
| Latvia | 6.3 |

Efficiency

| Team | EFFPG |
|---|---|
| Philippines | 95.0 |
| Brazil | 93.0 |
| Latvia | 82.5 |
| Montenegro | 80.5 |
| Georgia | 77.5 |

=== Awards ===
The all star-team and MVP were announced on 7 July 2024.

All-Star Team
| Guards | Forwards | Centers |
|---|---|---|
| (Latvia) Rihards Lomažs (Cameroon) Jeremiah Hill | (Philippines) Justin Brownlee (Brazil) Léo Meindl | (Brazil) Bruno Caboclo |
MVP: (Brazil) Bruno Caboclo
