= 2024 FIBA Men's Olympic Qualifying Tournaments – Valencia =

2024 FIBA World Olympic Qualifying Tournament for Men
Tournament details
- Host country: Spain
- City: Valencia
- Dates: 2–7 July
- Teams: 6
- Venue(s): 1 (in 1 host city)

Final positions
- Champions: Spain
- Runners-up: Bahamas
- Third place: Finland
- Fourth place: Lebanon

Tournament statistics
- Games played: 9
- Attendance: 31,680 (3,520 per game)
- MVP: (Spain) Santi Aldama
- Top scorer: (The Bahamas) Buddy Hield (19.8 ppg)

Official website
- Website

The 2024 FIBA Men's Olympic Qualifying Tournament in Valencia was one of four 2024 FIBA Men's Olympic Qualifying Tournaments. The tournament was held at Valencia, Spain, from 2 to 7 July 2024. Six teams participated in two groups of three teams, where the first-and second-placed teams qualified for the semifinals. The winner of the tournament advanced to the 2024 Summer Olympics.

Spain won the tournament after defeating the Bahamas in the final.

== Teams ==
Team	Qualification	Date of qualification	WR
Spain	One of top 16 eligible teams	10 September 2023	2
Poland	Winner of 2024 European Pre-Qualifying Tournament 1	20 August 2023	15
Finland	One of top 16 eligible teams	10 September 2023	20
Lebanon	One of top 16 eligible teams	10 September 2023	28
Angola	One of top 16 eligible teams	10 September 2023	34
Bahamas	Winner of 2024 Americas Pre-Qualifying Tournament	20 August 2023	57

== Venue ==
Valencia	2024 FIBA Men's Olympic Qualifying Tournaments – Valencia (Spain)
Pavelló Municipal Font de Sant Lluís	2024 FIBA Men's Olympic Qualifying Tournaments – Valencia (Spain)
Capacity: 9,000	2024 FIBA Men's Olympic Qualifying Tournaments – Valencia (Spain)

== Preliminary round ==
All times are local (UTC+2).

=== Group A ===
Pos	Team	Pld	W	L	PF	PA	PD	Pts	Qualification
1	Spain (H)	2	2	0	193	140	+53	4	Semi-finals
2	Lebanon	2	1	1	133	174	−41	3	Semi-finals
3	Angola	2	0	2	151	163	−12	2	

Source: FIBA
(H) Hosts

2 July 2024
20:30

Boxscore

Lebanon	59–104	Spain
Scoring by quarter: 18–24, 13–27, 13–27, 15–26
Pts: Khayat 20; Rebs: Khayat 6 Asts: Spellman 4		Pts: Aldama 17; Rebs: Aldama 9 Asts: Brown 9

Pavelló Municipal Font de Sant Lluís, Valencia
Attendance: 4,153
Referees: Mārtiņš Kozlovskis (LAT), Johnny Batista (PUR), Blanca Burns (USA)

3 July 2024
20:30

Boxscore

Spain	89–81	Angola
Scoring by quarter: 22–17, 24–26, 22–16, 21–22
Pts: Aldama 24; Rebs: W. Hernangómez 10; Asts: Brown 11		Pts: Bango 15; Rebs: Fernando 12; Asts: Gonçalves 5

Pavelló Municipal Font de Sant Lluís, Valencia
Attendance: 4,581
Referees: Jorge Vázquez (PUR), Johnny Batista (PUR), Yevgeniy Mikheyev (KAZ)

4 July 2024
17:30

Boxscore

Angola	70–74	Lebanon
Scoring by quarter: 13–19, 11–16, 21–9, 25–30
Pts: Gonçalves 13; Rebs: Bango 12; Asts: Fernando 4		Pts: Spellman 22; Rebs: Spellman 13; Asts: El Darwich 6

Pavelló Municipal Font de Sant Lluís, Valencia
Attendance: 805
Referees: Mārtiņš Kozlovskis (LAT), Juan Fernández (ARG), Boris Krejić (SLO)

=== Group B ===
Pos	Team	Pld	W	L	PF	PA	PD	Pts	Qualification
1	Bahamas	2	2	0	186	166	+20	4	Semi-finals
2	Finland	2	1	1	174	184	−10	3	Semi-finals
3	Poland	2	0	2	169	179	−10	2	

Source: FIBA

2 July 2024
17:30

Boxscore

Finland	85–96	Bahamas
Scoring by quarter: 26–27, 28–20, 13–26, 18–23
Pts: Jantunen, Maxhuni 20; Rebs: Jantunen 8 Asts: Maxhuni 6		Pts: Hield 24; Rebs: Ayton 9 Asts: Gordon 4

Pavelló Municipal Font de Sant Lluís, Valencia
Attendance: 2,731
Referees: Jorge Vázquez (PUR), Boris Krejić (SLO), Martin Vulić (CRO)

3 July 2024
17:30

Boxscore

Bahamas	90–81	Poland
Scoring by quarter: 30–20, 20–18, 23–21, 17–22
Pts: Edgecombe 21; Rebs: Ayton 9 Asts: Hield 10		Pts: Balcerowski 22; Rebs: Sochan 10; Asts: Ponitka, Slaughter 4

Pavelló Municipal Font de Sant Lluís, Valencia
Attendance: 2,574
Referees: Mārtiņš Kozlovskis (LAT), Juan Fernández (ARG), Blanca Burns (USA)

4 July 2024
20:30

Boxscore

Poland	88–89	Finland
Scoring by quarter: 24–24, 23–14, 24–22, 17–29
Pts: Slaughter 21; Rebs: Sochan 8 Asts: Pontika 7		Pts: Jantunen 20; Rebs: Nkamhoua 6 Asts: Maxhuni, Salin 6

Pavelló Municipal Font de Sant Lluís, Valencia
Attendance: 2,470
Referees: Jorge Vázquez (PUR), Johnny Batista (PUR), Martin Vulić (CRO)

== Final round ==
Semi-finals
6 July
Finland	74
Spain	81
6 July
Bahamas	89
Lebanon	72

Final
7 July
Spain	86
Bahamas	78

=== Semi-finals ===
6 July 2024
15:30

Boxscore

Bahamas	89–72	Lebanon
Scoring by quarter: 31–16, 19–20, 13–18, 26–18
Pts: Ayton 24; Rebs: Ayton 15; Asts: Hield 10		Pts: El Darwich 22; Rebs: Mansour 6 Asts: Mansour 7

Pavelló Municipal Font de Sant Lluís, Valencia
Attendance: 2,199
Referees: Jorge Vázquez (PUR), Juan Fernández (ARG), Boris Krejić (SLO)

6 July 2024
20:30

Boxscore

Finland	74–81	Spain
Scoring by quarter: 20–17, 10–21, 29–18, 15–25
Pts: Gustavson 15; Rebs: Jantunen 9 Asts: Little 4		Pts: W. Hernangómez 28; Rebs: Aldama 8 Asts: Brown 7

Pavelló Municipal Font de Sant Lluís, Valencia
Attendance: 5,132
Referees: Mārtiņš Kozlovskis (LAT), Johnny Batista (PUR), Blanca Burns (USA)

=== Final ===
7 July 2024
20:30

Boxscore

Spain	86–78	Bahamas
Scoring by quarter: 17–17, 25–17, 23–22, 21–22
Pts: Brown 18; Rebs: Aldama, W. Hernangómez 7 Asts: Díaz 4		Pts: Hield 19; Rebs: Ayton 14; Asts: Edgecombe 5

Pavelló Municipal Font de Sant Lluís, Valencia
Attendance: 7,035
Referees: Mārtiņš Kozlovskis (LAT), Johnny Batista (PUR), Boris Krejić (SLO)

== Final ranking ==
Pos	Team	Pld	W	L	Qualification
1	Spain	4	4	0	Qualified for the Olympics
2	Bahamas	4	3	1	
3	Finland	3	1	2	
4	Lebanon	3	1	2	
5	Poland	2	0	2	
6	Angola	2	0	2	

Source: FIBA

== Statistics and awards ==
=== Statistical leaders ===
Players

Points

Name	PPG
(The Bahamas) Buddy Hield	19.8
(The Bahamas) Deandre Ayton	19.5
(Spain) Willy Hernangómez	18.3
(Poland) Jeremy Sochan	18.0
(Finland) Mikael Jantunen	17.7

Rebounds

Name	RPG
(The Bahamas) Deandre Ayton	11.8
(Angola) Jilson Bango	10.5
(Angola) Bruno Fernando	10.0
(Poland) Jeremy Sochan	9.0
(Angola) Silvio De Sousa	8.0
(Spain) Santi Aldama	8.0

Assists

Name	APG
(Spain) Lorenzo Brown	7.5
(The Bahamas) Buddy Hield	5.8
(Poland) Mateusz Ponitka	5.5
(Finland) Edon Maxhuni	4.7
(Finland) Sasu Salin	4.5

Blocks

Name	BPG
(Spain) Santi Aldama	1.8
(Spain) Usman Garuba	1.5
five players	1.0

Steals

Name	SPG
(Angola) Bruno Fernando	2.5
(Angola) Childe Dundão	2.0
(The Bahamas) V. J. Edgecombe	2.0
(Poland) Mateusz Ponitka	2.0
eight players	1.5

Efficiency

Name	EFFPG
(The Bahamas) Deandre Ayton	28.3
(Finland) Mikael Jantunen	24.0
(Poland) Jeremy Sochan	23.0
(Spain) Santi Aldama	23.0
(Spain) Willy Hernangómez	22.0

==== Teams ====
Points

Team	PPG
Spain	90.0
Bahamas	88.3
Poland	84.5
Finland	82.7
Angola	75.5

Rebounds

Team	RPG
Angola	43.0
Bahamas	37.3
Spain	36.0
Lebanon	35.7
Finland	35.3

Assists

Team	APG
Finland	23.0
Spain	22.3
Bahamas	21.0
Poland	19.0
Lebanon	16.3

Blocks

Team	BPG
Spain	5.0
Angola	3.0
Bahamas	2.0
Lebanon	2.0
Poland	2.0

Steals

Team	SPG
Angola	8.0
Bahamas	8.0
Poland	8.0
Spain	8.0
Finland	6.0
Lebanon	6.0

Efficiency

Team	EFFPG
Spain	112.0
Bahamas	104.8
Poland	91.0
Finland	88.3
Angola	80.0

=== Awards ===
The all star-team and MVP were announced on 7 July 2024.

All-Star Team
Forwards	Centers
(Finland) Mikael Jantunen (Lebanon) Omari Spellman (Spain) Santi Aldama	(Spain) Willy Hernangómez (The Bahamas) Deandre Ayton
MVP: (Spain) Santi Aldama
