= 2023 Philippines FIBA Basketball World Cup team =

Sports team

Philippines
- Head coach: Chot Reyes
- Preliminary round: Fourth place
- Classification round: Second place
- Scoring leader: Jordan Clarkson 26
- Rebounding leader: A. J. Edu 8.6
- Assists leader: Jordan Clarkson 5.2
- Biggest win: 96–75 China (2 September 2023)
- Biggest defeat: 68–87 South Sudan (31 August 2023)
| Home | Away |
- All statistics correct as of September 3, 2023.

The Philippines men's national basketball team competed in the 2023 FIBA Basketball World Cup. The tournament will be co-hosted by the Philippines, Japan, and Indonesia from August 25 to September 10, 2023. This is the Philippines third straight appearance in the FIBA Basketball World Cup since its participation in the 2014 edition hosted in Spain.

== Timeline ==
- June 7: Training session begins and 21-man pool announced.
- June 21: Departure from the Philippines for a training camps in Estonia and Lithuania
- July 10: Return to the Philippines and resumption of local-based training
- August 23: Final 12-man roster announced.
- August 25 – September 10: 2023 FIBA Basketball World Cup

== Qualification ==
The Philippines as one of the co-hosts is already qualified. However they still took part in the qualifiers.

=== First round ===
| Pos | Team | Pld | W | L | PF | PA | PD | Pts | Qualification |
|---|---|---|---|---|---|---|---|---|---|
| 1 | New Zealand | 4 | 4 | 0 | 390 | 229 | +161 | 8 | Second round |
| 2 | Philippines (Note: Philippines advanced to the second round as one of the pre-qualified host teams, regardless of the first round results and standings.) | 4 | 2 | 2 | 290 | 321 | −31 | 6 | Second round |
| 3 | India | 4 | 0 | 4 | 233 | 363 | −130 | 4 | Second round |
| 4 | South Korea (Note: South Korea forfeited the games against the Philippines and New Zealand due to positive COVID-19 cases among its delegation and was subsequently disqualified.) | 0 | 0 | 0 | 0 | 0 | 0 | 0 | Disqualified |

Source: FIBA
Rules for classification: 1) Points; 2) Head-to-head results; 3) Points difference; 4) Points scored.

=== Second round ===
For the second round, the top three teams in each group qualify for the World Cup. As the Philippines already qualified. Fourth-placers Jordan also qualifies.

| Pos | Team | Pld | W | L | PF | PA | PD | Pts | Qualification |
|---|---|---|---|---|---|---|---|---|---|
| 1 | New Zealand | 10 | 8 | 2 | 926 | 689 | +237 | 18 | 2023 FIBA Basketball World Cup |
| 2 | Lebanon | 10 | 7 | 3 | 870 | 768 | +102 | 17 | 2023 FIBA Basketball World Cup |
| 3 | Philippines | 10 | 6 | 4 | 802 | 768 | +34 | 16 (Note: Philippines 164–157 Jordan) | Qualified for 2023 FIBA Basketball World Cup as hosts |
| 4 | Jordan | 10 | 6 | 4 | 775 | 751 | +24 | 16 | 2023 FIBA Basketball World Cup |
| 5 | Saudi Arabia | 10 | 3 | 7 | 654 | 767 | −113 | 13 | |
| 6 | India | 10 | 0 | 10 | 611 | 895 | −284 | 10 | |

Source: FIBA
Rules for classification: 1) Points; 2) Head-to-head results; 3) Points difference; 4) Points scored.

== Exhibition games ==
=== Europe training camps ===
The first training camp of the Philippine national team commenced at the Meralco Gym in Pasig on June 7, 2023. They would hold a training camp in Estonia, playing games against the junior Estonia team as well as against Finland. In Lithuania, Philippines won two matches against the under-20 Ukrainian team. They lost a match against a Lithuanian selection team but won a game against Lithuania's Universiade team.

By July 10, they returned to the Philippines from Lithuania. The national team played matches against collegiate team, Ateneo Blue Eagles and PBA team Magnolia Hotshots, both of which they won.

=== Heyuan WUS Tournament ===
The national team headed to Heyuan in Guangdong province in China to take part in the Heyuan WUS International Basketball Tournament, a series of basketball matches which also featured Iran and Senegal. The Iran team which played in China is a B team. Lebanon was to also participate but withdrew. The Philippines played against their two opposition twice.

The Philippines ended their Heyuan tournament with a 3–1 record, beating Iran twice and Senegal once.

=== Final tune-up matches at home ===
Prior to the start of the World Cup in August, the Philippines planned to play tune-up matches against other teams participating in the tournament as well as PBA teams. They would win a game against the Ivory Coast, before losing matches against Montenegro and Mexico.

=== Summary ===
Against local-based sides

July 20
16:30

Report, 2

| Philippines | 86–81 | Ateneo Blue Eagles |

Moro Lorenzo Gym, Quezon City

July 28

Report

| Philippines | 93–77 | Magnolia Hotshots |

Meralco Gym, Pasig

Tune up matches in Estonia

June 27
18:00 (UTC+3)

Report

| Estonia (Note: Junior national team) | 81–71 | Philippines |
Scoring by quarter: 29–14, 20–21, 15–24, 17–12
| Pts: Jürgens 20; Rebs: Jurkatamm 7 Asts: Kirsipuu 6 | | Pts: Ramos 16; Rebs: Fajardo 9 Asts: four players 2 |

Kalev Sports Hall, Tallinn

June 28
18:00 (UTC+3)

Report

| Finland | 89–85 | Philippines |
Scoring by quarter: 26–11, 25–31, 17–18, 21–25
| Pts: Little 19; Rebs: Grandison 12; Asts: Grandison 3 | | Pts: Ramos 15; Rebs: Malonzo 7 Asts: Thompson 4 |

Kalev Sports Hall, Tallinn

Tune up matches in Lithuania

July 1
18:00 (UTC+3)

Report

| Philippines | 70–61 | Ukraine U20 |
Scoring by quarter: 16–12, 17–19, 20–17, 17–13
| Pts: Abando 18; Rebs: Ramos 8 Asts: Brownlee, K. Ravena 5 | | Pts: Kobzystyi 21; Rebs: Brynyuk 6 Asts: Koshevatsky 4 |

Žalgiris Arena, Kaunas

July 2
17:00 (UTC+3)

Report

| Philippines | 84–74 | Ukraine U20 |
Scoring by quarter: 20–20, 25–22, 24–18, 15–14
| Pts: Brownlee 21; Rebs: Brownlee 8 Asts: Perez 8 | | Pts: Kobzystyi 15; Rebs: Brynyuk 10; Asts: Koshevatsky 5 |

Žalgiris Arena, Kaunas

July 4
– (UTC+3)

Report 1, 2

| Lithuania Selection | 90–80 | Philippines |

Žalgiris Arena, Kaunas

July 8
11:00 (UTC+3)

Report

| Lithuania Universiade | 102–125 | Philippines |

Žalgiris Arena, Kaunas

Heyuan WUS International Basketball Tournament

August 3
20:00 (UTC+8)

Report

| Philippines | 76–65 | Iran B |

Heyuan Gymnasium, Heyuan

August 4
20:00 (UTC+8)

Report

| Philippines | 64–72 | Senegal |

Jiangman En Ping Sport Gymnasium, Enping

August 6
20:00 (UTC+8)

| Philippines | 75–63 | Senegal |

Heyuan Gymnasium, Heyuan

August 7
20:00 (UTC+8)

| Philippines | 63–48 | Iran B |

Xiaoqing Sport Center, Zhaoqing

Last tune up matches in the Philippines

August 18
20:00 (UTC+8)

Report

| Philippines | 85–62 | Ivory Coast |
Scoring by quarter: 27–24, 15–14, 18–15, 25–9
| Pts: Clarkson, Fajardo 13; Rebs: Edu 7 Asts: Thompson 5 | | Pts: Diadet, Kone 12; Rebs: Sidibe 9 Asts: Diabate 4 |

PhilSports Arena, Pasig

August 20
20:00 (UTC+8)

Report

| Philippines | 87–102 | Montenegro |
Scoring by quarter: 19–16, 23–28, 22–32, 23–26
| Pts: Clarkson 27; Rebs: Edu 8 Asts: Clarkson 5 | | Pts: Vučević 18; Rebs: Vučević 9 Asts: Perry 9 |

PhilSports Arena, Pasig

August 21
20:00 (UTC+8)

Report

| Philippines | 77–84 | Mexico |
Scoring by quarter: 27–31, 24–20, 12–18, 14–15
| Pts: Thompson 14; Rebs: Fajardo, Thompson 6 Asts: Thompson 5 | | Pts: Stoll 17; Rebs: Ibarra 9 Asts: Girón, Stoll 4 |

PhilSports Arena, Pasig

== Group phase ==
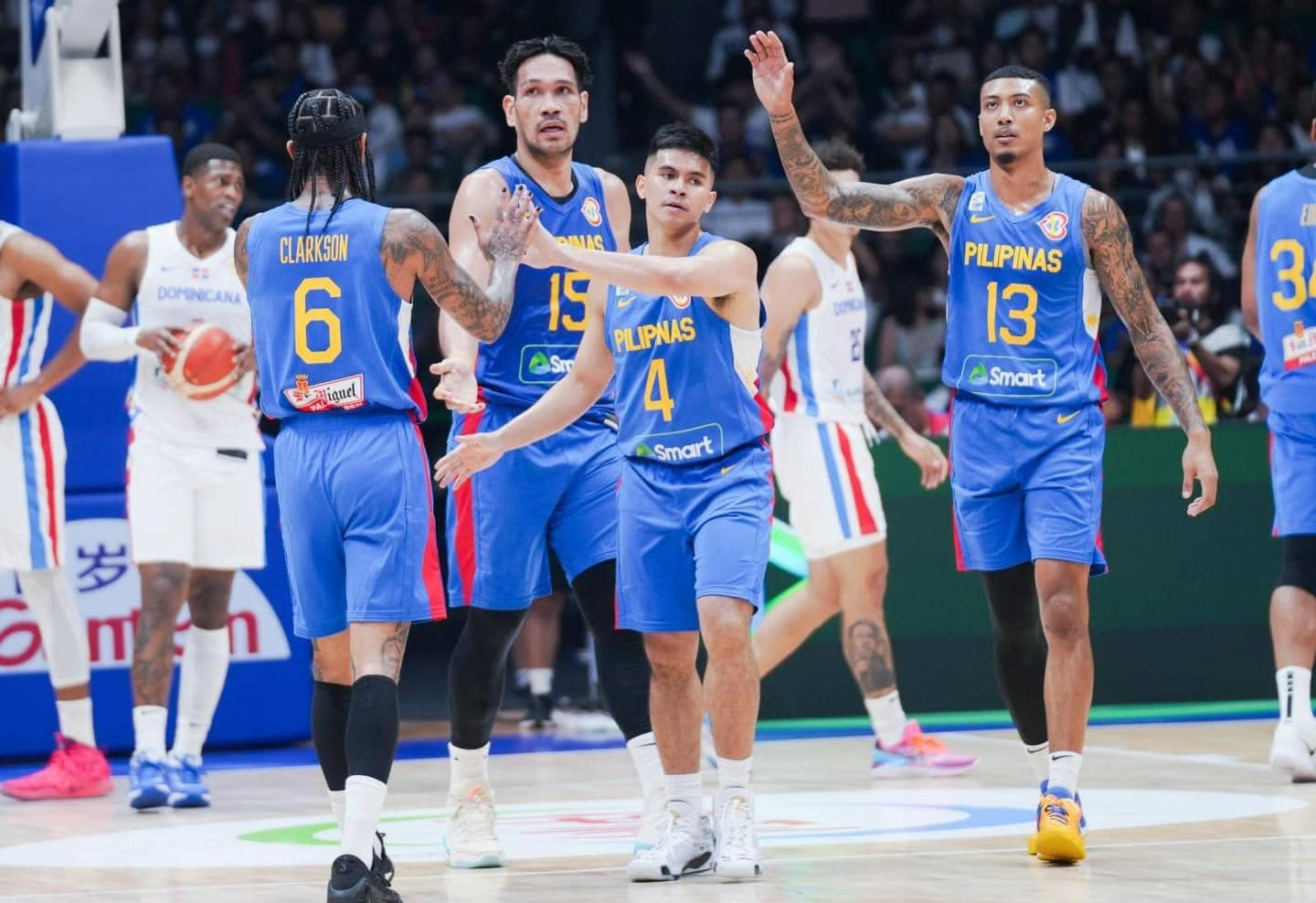
Game against the Dominican Republic at the Philippine Arena.

The Philippines as hosts were drawn into Group A with Angola, the Dominican Republic, and Italy.

| Pos | Team | Pld | W | L | PF | PA | PD | Pts | Qualification |
|---|---|---|---|---|---|---|---|---|---|
| 1 | Dominican Republic | 3 | 3 | 0 | 249 | 230 | +19 | 6 | Second round |
| 2 | Italy | 3 | 2 | 1 | 253 | 237 | +16 | 5 | Second round |
| 3 | Angola | 3 | 1 | 2 | 214 | 226 | −12 | 4 | 17th–32nd classification |
| 4 | Philippines (H) | 3 | 0 | 3 | 234 | 257 | −23 | 3 | 17th–32nd classification |

Source: FIBA
Rules for classification: Tiebreakers
(H) Hosts

All times are local UTC+8.

=== Dominican Republic ===
This was the first game between the Dominican Republic and the Philippines in the World Cup. The Dominicans won in the 2020 FIBA Men's Olympic Qualifying Tournament in Belgrade, which was the last competitive game between the two teams.

The match broke the record for the most attended FIBA World Cup match with 38,115 coming to the venue. This surpassed the 1994 FIBA World Championship final in Toronto between the United States and Russia which was witnessed by an audience of 32,616 people.

25 August 2023
20:00

Boxscore

| Dominican Republic | 87–81 | Philippines |
Scoring by quarter: 22–18, 20–24, 24–22, 21–17
| Pts: Towns 26; Rebs: Towns 10; Asts: Feliz 8 | | Pts: Clarkson 28; Rebs: Clarkson, Fajardo 7 Asts: Clarkson 7 |

Philippine Arena, Bocaue
Attendance: 38,115
Referees: Yohan Rosso (FRA), Leandro Zalazar (ARG), Gatis Saliņš (LAT)

=== Angola ===
This was the second game between the Philippines and Angola in the World Cup. The Angolans won the first meeting in 2019, which was the last competitive game between the two teams.

The Philippines conceded their second game against Angola despite leading by as much as 11 points. They would trail behind Angola by the end of the first half and never made a comeback.

27 August 2023
20:00

Boxscore

| Philippines | 70–80 | Angola |
Scoring by quarter: 19–12, 14–24, 19–20, 18–24
| Pts: Clarkson 21; Rebs: Fajardo 7 Asts: Clarkson 7 | | Pts: Gonçalves 17; Rebs: Bango, Fernando 7 Asts: Domingos 7 |

Araneta Coliseum, Quezon City
Attendance: 12,784
Referees: Guilherme Locatelli (BRA), Mārtiņš Kozlovskis (LAT), Martin Vulić (CRO)

=== Italy ===
This was the third game between the Philippines and Italy in the World Cup. The Italians won the first two meetings in 1978 and 2019.

At the team introduction, coach Chot Reyes was jeered by the crowd which player Jordan Clarkson described as "weird" in the post-game interview.

The team lost to Italy, which meant that the Philippines finished the first round without a win. Reyes apologized to national federation chairman emiritus Manny Pangilinan through text after the lost.

29 August 2023
20:00

Boxscore

| Philippines | 83–90 | Italy |
Scoring by quarter: 23–20, 16–28, 21–25, 23–17
| Pts: Clarkson 23; Rebs: Edu 8 Asts: Clarkson 6 | | Pts: Fontecchio 18; Rebs: Fontecchio, Melli 6 Asts: Spissu 9 |

Araneta Coliseum, Quezon City
Attendance: 11,821
Referees: Yohan Rosso (FRA), Leandro Zalazar (ARG), Mārtiņš Kozlovskis (LAT)

== Classification round ==
The Philippines finished last in the first round which relegated them to the classification round.

As no Asian team advanced to the second round, they were still in contention to clinch the sole Asian berth for the men's basketball tournament of the 2024 Summer Olympics in France.

| Pos | Team | Pld | W | L | PF | PA | PD | Pts |
|---|---|---|---|---|---|---|---|---|
| 1 | South Sudan | 5 | 3 | 2 | 456 | 431 | +25 | 8 |
| 2 | Philippines (H) | 5 | 1 | 4 | 398 | 419 | −21 | 6 (Note: Philippines 3 Pts, +11 PD; Angola 3 Pts, +3 PD; China 3 Pts, −14 PD) |
| 3 | Angola | 5 | 1 | 4 | 368 | 410 | −42 | 6 |
| 4 | China | 5 | 1 | 4 | 379 | 473 | −94 | 6 |

Source: FIBA
Rules for classification: Tiebreakers
(H) Hosts

=== South Sudan ===
This is the first time South Sudan and the Philippines played against each other. The Philippines lost to South Sudan, with coach Chot Reyes admitting that the team's morale is "really low".

Asked about his career's future, Reyes defers to any decision of the Samahang Basketball ng Pilipinas, national federation would make adding that people already know he has "already retired and left this job several times" and that he has returned to the position on occasions when requested by the SBP since he could not turn down the "call of service for our country".

The lost also meant that the Philippines failed to secure a direct qualification to the Olympics, although they can still get a place in the FIBA Olympic Qualifying Tournament.

August 31, 2023
20:00

Boxscore

| South Sudan | 87–68 | Philippines |
Scoring by quarter: 34–17, 17–16, 9–17, 27–18
| Pts: Jones 17; Rebs: Gabriel 11; Asts: Jones 14 | | Pts: Clarkson 24; Rebs: Edu 14; Asts: Ravena 5 |

Araneta Coliseum, Quezon City
Attendance: 9,250
Referees: Guilherme Locatelli (BRA), Gatis Saliņš (LAT), Georgios Poursanidis (GRE)

=== China ===
The Philippines and China last played against each other in the 2018 Asian Games with the latter team winning 80–82. The Philippines would not end their campaign winless after they clinch a victory at China's expense. It would also be the country's first FIBA Basketball World Cup win on home soil, as they were not able to register a victory in their last hosting in 1978.

2 September 2023
20:00

Boxscore

| Philippines | 96–75 | China |
Scoring by quarter: 16–16, 23–24, 34–11, 23–24
| Pts: Clarkson 34; Rebs: Edu 10; Asts: Ramos, Thompson 4 | | Pts: Li 17; Rebs: Li 9 Asts: Li 5 |

Araneta Coliseum, Quezon City
Attendance: 11,080
Referees: Mārtiņš Kozlovskis (LAT), Kerem Baki (TUR), Martin Vulić (CRO)

== Aftermath ==
Chot Reyes would step down from the head coaching role of the Philippine national team shortly after their final game against China. Reyes has expressed non-interest to get involved in the selection process for his successor who is expected to guide the Philippines at the 2022 Asian Games (Note: postponed to 2023) in Hangzhou, China.

The Philippines failed to qualify directly for the men's basketball tournament of the 2024 Summer Olympics in Paris via finishing as the best team from FIBA Asia. It was Japan that was able to qualify through this route. The Philippines however qualified for the 2024 FIBA Men's Olympic Qualifying Tournament giving them an alternate route to get into the Olympics.
