= 2024 FIBA Men's Olympic Qualifying Tournaments – Piraeus =

2024 FIBA World Olympic Qualifying Tournament for Men
Tournament details
- Host country: Greece
- City: Piraeus
- Dates: 2–7 July
- Teams: 6
- Venue: 1 (in 1 host city)

Final positions
- Champions: Greece
- Runners-up: Croatia
- Third place: Dominican Republic
- Fourth place: Slovenia

Tournament statistics
- Games played: 9
- Attendance: 55,492 (6,166 per game)
- MVP: (Greece) Giannis Antetokounmpo
- Top scorer: (Slovenia) Luka Dončić (27.7 ppg)

Official website
- Website

The 2024 FIBA Men's Olympic Qualifying Tournament in Piraeus was one of four 2024 FIBA Men's Olympic Qualifying Tournaments. The tournament was held at Piraeus, Greece, from 2 to 7 July 2024. Six teams participated in two groups of three teams, where the first-and second-placed teams qualified for the semifinals. The winner of the tournament advanced to the 2024 Summer Olympics.

Greece won the tournament with a finals win over Croatia.

== Teams ==
Team	Qualification	Date of qualification	WR
Slovenia	One of top 16 eligible teams	10 September 2023	11
Greece	One of top 16 eligible teams	10 September 2023	14
Dominican Republic	One of top 16 eligible teams	10 September 2023	19
New Zealand	Highest-ranked eligible team – Asia and Oceania	10 September 2023	21
Croatia	Winner of 2024 European Pre-Qualifying Tournament 2	20 August 2023	30
Egypt	Highest-ranked eligible team – Africa	10 September 2023	40

== Venue ==
Piraeus	2024 FIBA Men's Olympic Qualifying Tournaments – Piraeus (Greece)
Peace and Friendship Stadium	2024 FIBA Men's Olympic Qualifying Tournaments – Piraeus (Greece)
Capacity: 11,640	2024 FIBA Men's Olympic Qualifying Tournaments – Piraeus (Greece)

== Preliminary round ==
All times are local (UTC+3).

=== Group A ===
Pos	Team	Pld	W	L	PF	PA	PD	Pts	Qualification
1	Croatia	2	1	1	194	182	+12	3	Semi-finals
2	Slovenia	2	1	1	196	186	+10	3	Semi-finals
3	New Zealand	2	1	1	168	190	−22	3	

Source: FIBA

2 July 2024
21:00

Boxscore

Slovenia	92–108	Croatia
Scoring by quarter: 16–31, 25–23, 27–39, 24–15
Pts: Dončić 26; Rebs: Dončić 11; Asts: Dončić 10		Pts: Filipović 21; Rebs: Šarić 10; Asts: Šarić 10

Peace and Friendship Stadium, Piraeus
Attendance: 4,109
Referees: Luis Vázquez (PUR), Gatis Saliņš (LAT), Daniel García (VEN)

3 July 2024
17:30

Boxscore

Croatia	86–90	New Zealand
Scoring by quarter: 29–28, 31–27, 19–19, 7–16
Pts: Zubac 29; Rebs: Zubac 16; Asts: Hezonja 6		Pts: Webster 21; Rebs: Delany 9 Asts: Ili 4

Peace and Friendship Stadium, Piraeus
Attendance: 396
Referees: Manuel Mazzoni (ITA), Julio Anaya (PAN), Ahmed Al-Shuwaili (IRQ)

4 July 2024
17:30

Boxscore

New Zealand	78–104	Slovenia
Scoring by quarter: 9–27, 30–19, 18–31, 21–27
Pts: Ili 28; Rebs: Ili 10; Asts: Ili 4		Pts: Dončić 36; Rebs: Nebo 12; Asts: Dončić 10

Peace and Friendship Stadium, Piraeus
Attendance: 1,885
Referees: Roberto Vázquez (PUR), Julio Anaya (PAN), Amy Bonner (USA)

=== Group B ===
Pos	Team	Pld	W	L	PF	PA	PD	Pts	Qualification
1	Greece (H)	2	2	0	202	153	+49	4	Semi-finals
2	Dominican Republic	2	1	1	172	186	−14	3	Semi-finals
3	Egypt	2	0	2	148	183	−35	2	

Source: FIBA
(H) Hosts

2 July 2024
17:30

Boxscore

Egypt	77–90	Dominican Republic
Scoring by quarter: 22–16, 9–27, 17–25, 29–22
Pts: Metwaly 24; Rebs: El-Sheikh, Oraby 4 Asts: Gendy 4		Pts: Montero 17; Rebs: Nunez 9 Asts: Feliz 5

Peace and Friendship Stadium, Piraeus
Attendance: 493
Referees: Julio Anaya (PAN), Manuel Mazzoni (ITA), Scott Beker (AUS)

3 July 2024
21:00

Boxscore

Dominican Republic	82–109	Greece
Scoring by quarter: 15–25, 26–31, 24–24, 17–29
Pts: Duarte 26; Rebs: Montero, Santos 5 Asts: Montero 5		Pts: G. Antetokounmpo 32; Rebs: Mitoglou 6 Asts: Calathes 11

Peace and Friendship Stadium, Piraeus
Attendance: 11,648
Referees: Luis Vázquez (PUR), Gatis Saliņš (LAT), Amy Bonner (USA)

4 July 2024
21:00

Boxscore

Greece	93–71	Egypt
Scoring by quarter: 20–12, 22–26, 26–14, 25–19
Pts: Mitoglou, Papagiannis 16; Rebs: Calathes, Papagiannis 5 Asts: Calathes 9		Pts: Metwaly 22; Rebs: Mahmoud, Oraby 6 Asts: Refaat 4

Peace and Friendship Stadium, Piraeus
Attendance: 11,216
Referees: Manuel Mazzoni (ITA), Daniel García (VEN), Scott Beker (AUS)

== Final round ==
Semi-finals
6 July
Dominican Republic	77
Croatia	80
6 July
Greece	96
Slovenia	68

Final
7 July
Croatia	69
Greece	80

=== Semi-finals ===
6 July 2024
17:30

Boxscore

Greece	96–68	Slovenia
Scoring by quarter: 32–14, 15–19, 19–17, 30–18
Pts: Walkup 19; Rebs: Papagiannis 10; Asts: Calathes 11		Pts: Dončić 21; Rebs: Dončić, Nebo 7 Asts: Dončić 5

Peace and Friendship Stadium, Piraeus
Attendance: 11,998
Referees: Luis Vázquez (PUR), Gatis Saliņš (LAT), Amy Bonner (USA)

6 July 2024
21:00

Boxscore

Dominican Republic	77–80	Croatia
Scoring by quarter: 15–16, 17–21, 21–16, 24–27
Pts: Duarte 17; Rebs: Montero, Santos 5 Asts: Duarte, Montero 4		Pts: Zubac 25; Rebs: Zubac 9 Asts: Hezonja 4

Peace and Friendship Stadium, Piraeus
Attendance: 1,907
Referees: Julio Anaya (PAN), Manuel Mazzoni (ITA), Ahmed Al-Shuwaili (IRQ)

=== Final ===
7 July 2024
21:00

Boxscore

Croatia	69–80	Greece
Scoring by quarter: 22–22, 17–23, 14–21, 16–14
Pts: Zubac 19; Rebs: Šarić, Zubac 12; Asts: Smith 7		Pts: G. Antetokounmpo 23; Rebs: G. Antetokounmpo 8 Asts: Calathes 11

Peace and Friendship Stadium, Piraeus
Attendance: 11,810
Referees: Roberto Vázquez (PUR), Gatis Saliņš (LAT), Julio Anaya (PAN)

== Final ranking ==
Pos	Team	Pld	W	L	Qualification
1	Greece	4	4	0	Qualified for the Olympics
2	Croatia	4	2	2	
3	Dominican Republic	3	1	2	
4	Slovenia	3	1	2	
5	New Zealand	2	1	1	
6	Egypt	2	0	2	

Source: FIBA

== Statistics and awards ==
=== Statistical leaders ===
Players

Points

Name	PPG
(Slovenia) Luka Dončić	27.7
(Egypt) Ahmed Metwaly	23.0
(New Zealand) Shea Ili	23.0
(Croatia) Ivica Zubac	22.8
(Greece) Giannis Antetokounmpo	22.7

Rebounds

Name	RPG
(Croatia) Ivica Zubac	11.3
(Slovenia) Luka Dončić	9.7
(Slovenia) Josh Nebo	9.3
(Croatia) Dario Šarić	8.8
(New Zealand) Finn Delany	8.5

Assists

Name	APG
(Greece) Nick Calathes	10.5
(Slovenia) Luka Dončić	8.3
(Croatia) Dario Šarić	5.5
(Croatia) Mario Hezonja	5.3
(Croatia) Jaleen Smith	4.5

Blocks

Name	BPG
(Egypt) Anas Mahmoud	2.0
(Greece) Giannis Antetokounmpo	1.0
(Greece) Georgios Papagiannis	1.0
(Croatia) Ivica Zubac	0.8
six players	0.5

Steals

Name	SPG
(Dominican Republic) Chris Duarte	2.3
(Egypt) Ahmed Metwaly	2.0
(Egypt) Youssef Refaat	2.0
(Greece) Thomas Walkup	1.8
(Slovenia) Zoran Dragić	1.3

Efficiency

Name	EFFPG
(Croatia) Ivica Zubac	33.0
(Slovenia) Luka Dončić	26.3
(New Zealand) Shea Ili	26.0
(Greece) Giannis Antetokounmpo	23.0
(Slovenia) Josh Nebo	21.7

==== Teams ====
Points

Team	PPG
Greece	94.5
Slovenia	88.0
Croatia	85.8
New Zealand	84.0
Dominican Republic	83.0

Rebounds

Team	RPG
Croatia	40.3
New Zealand	39.0
Slovenia	36.3
Greece	32.0
Dominican Republic	31.3

Assists

Team	APG
Greece	26.8
Croatia	23.5
Slovenia	18.7
Egypt	15.5
Dominican Republic	15.3

Blocks

Team	BPG
Egypt	3.5
Greece	2.3
Slovenia	1.7
Dominican Republic	1.7
New Zealand	1.5

Steals

Team	SPG
Dominican Republic	8.0
Greece	7.3
Egypt	7.0
Slovenia	5.3
New Zealand	4.0
Croatia	4.0

Efficiency

Team	EFFPG
Greece	116.3
Croatia	104.0
Slovenia	92.7
Dominican Republic	88.0
New Zealand	82.0

=== Awards ===
The all star-team and MVP were announced on 7 July 2024.

All-Star Team
Guards	Forwards	Centers
(Dominican Republic) Chris Duarte (Slovenia) Luka Dončić (Greece) Nick Calathes	(Greece) Giannis Antetokounmpo	(Croatia) Ivica Zubac
MVP: (Greece) Giannis Antetokounmpo
