= Ousmane N'Diaye =

Ousmane N'Diaye may refer to:

- Ousmane N'Diaye (basketball) (born 2004), Senegalese basketball player
- Ousmane N'Diaye (footballer) (born 1991), Senegalese professional footballer
