= Barra Njie =

Swedish basketball player (born 2001)

Alagie Barra Njie
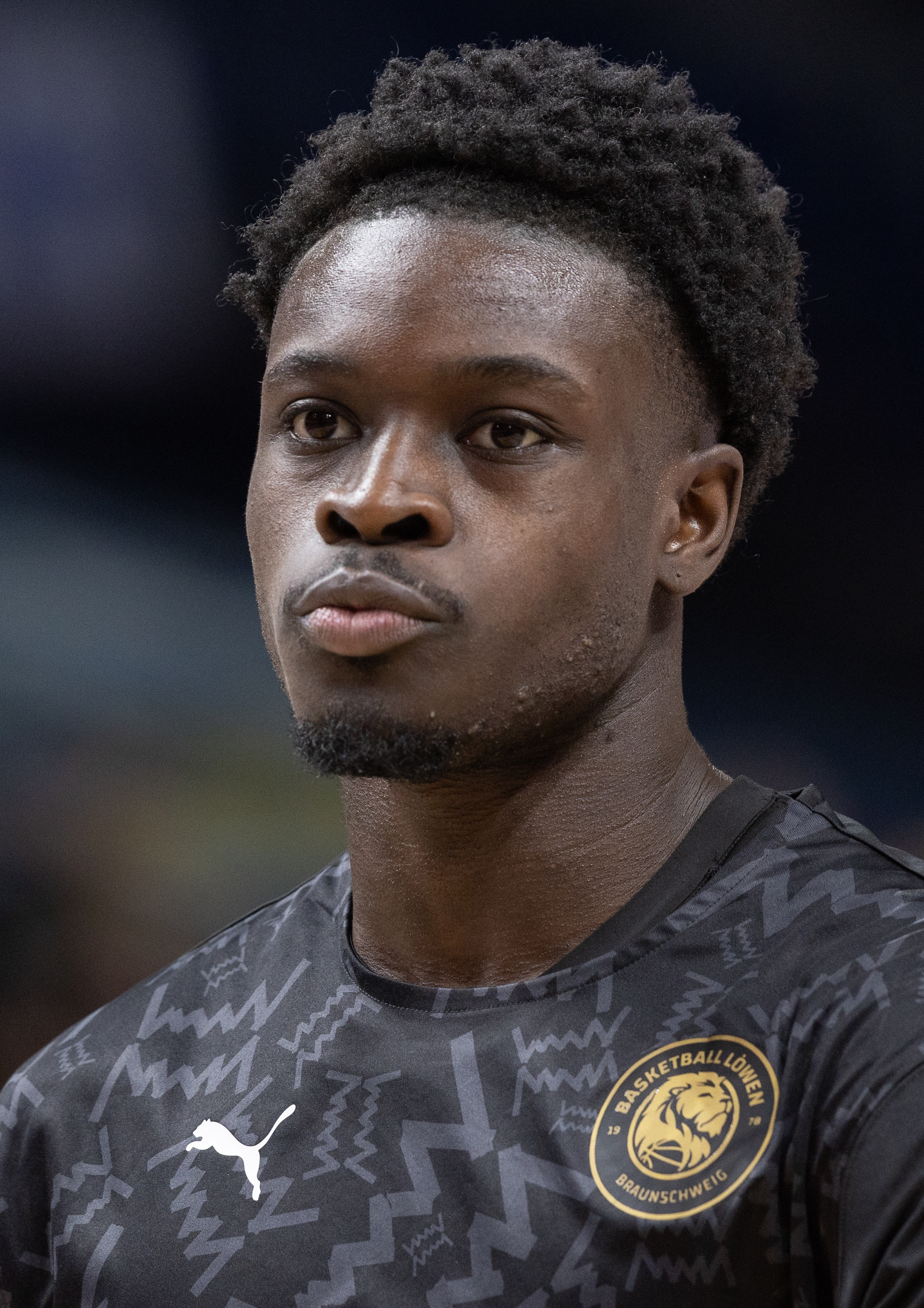

No. 13 – BC Vienna
- Position: Point guard
- League: Austrian Basketball Superliga

Personal information
- Born: 13 January 2001 (age 25) Stockholm, Sweden
- Listed height: 1.91 m (6 ft 3 in)
- Listed weight: 82 kg (181 lb)

Career information
- High school: St. Benedict's Preparatory School
- NBA draft: 2022: undrafted
- Playing career: 2020–present

Career history
- 2020–2021: Fryshuset Basket
- 2021–2022: Delaware Blue Coats
- 2023: Iraurgi SB
- 2023–2026: Löwen Braunschweig
- 2026–present: BC Vienna

Career highlights
- Basketligan Rookie of the Year (2020–21)

Alagie Barra Njie (born 13 January 2001) is a Swedish professional basketball player for BC Vienna of the Austrian Basketball Superliga. He is also a member of the Swedish national team, and usually plays as a point guard.

== Early life and youth career ==
Njie grew up in Stockholm, playing youth basketball at Fryshuset Basket. He is of Gambian descent. He moved to the United States to attend Saint Benedict's Preparatory School in New Jersey, where he played in the prep basketball system (2017–2020).

== Club career ==
Returning to Sweden, Njie joined Basketligan team Fryshuset Basket for the 2020–21 season, averaging 17.8 points, 6.2 rebounds, and 4.9 assists per game and winning Rookie of the Year.

In 2021–22, he signed with Delaware Blue Coats of the NBA G League, appearing in 26 games and averaging 2.5 points per game.

He returned to Europe in early 2023, signing with Iraurgi SB in Spain's LEB Oro and averaging 11.1 points and 2.8 assists per game.

In August 2023, Njie signed with Löwen Braunschweig of the BBL on a three-year contract. He was praised for his athleticism, versatility, and dynamic two-way play.

During the 2024–25 FIBA Europe Cup season, Njie averaged 12.8 points, 2.8 rebounds, and 4.8 assists per game for Braunschweig.

== International career ==
Njie has represented Sweden internationally, including at the 2024 FIBA Men's Pre-Qualifying Olympic Qualifying Tournaments and the EuroBasket 2025 qualifiers.

In the EuroBasket 2025 group stage against Finland, he scored 6 points and contributed 5 assists in 16 minutes.

Njie shares a mentor–player relationship with Dennis Schröder, who is a minority owner of Braunschweig. The two also clash on court in competitive matches, generating attention during EuroBasket 2025:

== Career statistics ==
=== National team ===
Team	Tournament	Pos.	GP	PPG	RPG	APG
Sweden	EuroBasket 2025	16th	6	7.7	2.8	3.8
