= 2024 FIBA Men's Pre-Qualifying Olympic Qualifying Tournaments – Africa =

2024 FIBA Men's Pre-Qualifying Olympic Qualifying Tournaments
Tournament details
- Host country: Nigeria
- City: Lagos
- Dates: 14–20 August 2023
- Teams: 6 (from 1 confederation)
- Venue(s): 1 (in 1 host city)

Final positions
- Champions: Cameroon

Tournament statistics
- Top scorer: (Nigeria) Uchenna Iroegbu (25.0 ppg)
- Top rebounds: (Senegal) Ousmane N'Diaye (9.0 rpg)
- Top assists: (Cameroon) Jeremiah Hill (9.3 apg)

Official website
- OPQT Nigeria

The 2024 FIBA Men's Pre-Qualifying Olympic Qualifying Tournaments in Africa was one of five 2024 FIBA Men's Pre-Qualifying Olympic Qualifying Tournaments. The tournament was held from 14 to 20 August 2023 in Lagos, Nigeria. Cameroon, as the winner, qualified for the 2024 FIBA Men's Olympic Qualifying Tournaments.

== Teams ==
Teams that missed out on the 2023 FIBA Basketball World Cup and the next best-ranked team will participate.

Qualification method		Places	Qualified team
2023 FIBA World Cup Qualifiers – Africa	3rd (worst-ranked)	1	Senegal
2023 FIBA World Cup Qualifiers – Africa	4th	2	Nigeria
2023 FIBA World Cup Qualifiers – Africa	4th	2	Tunisia
2023 FIBA World Cup Qualifiers – Africa	5th	2	Guinea
2023 FIBA World Cup Qualifiers – Africa	5th	2	~~DR Congo~~ (Note: The Democratic Republic of the Congo withdrew before the tournament.)
2023 FIBA World Cup Qualifiers – Africa	6th	2	~~Uganda~~ (Note: Uganda withdrew before the tournament.)
2023 FIBA World Cup Qualifiers – Africa	6th	2	Cameroon
FIBA World Rankings – Africa (November 2022)		1	Mali
Total		8	

== Draw ==
The draw took place on 1 May 2023.

=== Seeding ===
The seedings were announced on 29 April 2023.

Pot 1	Pot 2	Pot 3	Pot 4
Nigeria; Tunisia	Senegal; Cameroon	~~DR Congo~~; ~~Uganda~~	Mali; Guinea

== Preliminary round ==
All times are local (UTC+1).

=== Group A ===
Pos	Team	Pld	W	L	PF	PA	PD	Pts	Qualification
1	Senegal	2	2	0	167	158	+9	4	Semi-finals
2	Mali	2	1	1	148	142	+6	3	Semi-finals
3	Nigeria (H)	2	0	2	155	170	−15	2	

Source: FIBA
Rules for classification: 1) points; 2) head-to-head points; 3) head-to-head points difference; 4) head-to-head number of points scored.
(H) Hosts

14 August 2023
18:00

Boxscore

Senegal	93–87	Nigeria
Scoring by quarter: 25–26, 21–18, 21–24, 26–19
Pts: Ndoye 15; Rebs: Diop 8 Asts: Badio 5		Pts: Iroegbu 24; Rebs: Metu 10; Asts: Iroegbu 5

Eko Convention Center, Lagos
Referees: Amr Aboollo (EGY), Cherubin Leslie (MRI), Tonton Banza (COD)

15 August 2023
18:00

Boxscore

Nigeria	68–77	Mali
Scoring by quarter: 17–15, 26–23, 18–15, 7–24
Pts: Iroegbu 26; Rebs: three players 5 Asts: Ndugba 6		Pts: F. Drame, H. Drame 14; Rebs: F. Drame 10; Asts: Kanté, Konaté 2

Eko Convention Center, Lagos

17 August 2023
18:00

Boxscore

Senegal	74–71	Mali
Scoring by quarter: 19–16, 14–22, 16–16, 25–17
Pts: Badio 19; Rebs: N'Diaye 13; Asts: Sambe 5		Pts: F. Drame 19; Rebs: Diarra 14; Asts: Kante 10

Eko Convention Center, Lagos

=== Group B ===
Pos	Team	Pld	W	L	PF	PA	PD	Pts	Qualification
1	Cameroon	2	2	0	187	144	+43	4	Semi-finals
2	Guinea	2	1	1	169	190	−21	3	Semi-finals
3	Tunisia	2	0	2	156	178	−22	2	

Source: FIBA
Rules for classification: 1) points; 2) head-to-head points; 3) head-to-head points difference; 4) head-to-head number of points scored.

15 August 2023
15:00

Boxscore

Cameroon	104–74	Guinea
Scoring by quarter: 19–20, 26–20, 33–19, 26–15
Pts: Ateba 27; Rebs: Bayehe, Nyama 5 Asts: Hill 11		Pts: Diallo 25; Rebs: Diallo 9 Asts: Diallo 9

Eko Convention Center, Lagos
Referees: Antonio Bernando (ANG), Hassane Kamaté (CIV), Walelign Gebeto (ETH)

16 August 2023
18:00

Boxscore

Tunisia	70–83	Cameroon
Scoring by quarter: 21–19, 18–18, 23–23, 8–23
Pts: Abada 22; Rebs: Lahyani 7 Asts: Abada, Jawadi 6		Pts: Hill 19; Rebs: Bayehe 13; Asts: Hill 5

Eko Convention Center, Lagos
Referees: Youssouf Maiga (MLI), Babacar Gueye (SEN), Diallo Mahamadou (MLI)

18 August 2023
18:00

Boxscore

Guinea	95–86	Tunisia
Scoring by quarter: 20–21, 29–20, 25–18, 21–27
Pts: Kaba 22; Rebs: Condé, Kaba 8 Asts: Diallo 10		Pts: Abada 26; Rebs: Lahiani 8 Asts: Abada 9

Eko Convention Center, Lagos
Referees: Tonton Banza (COD), Didier Gaga (RWA), Haytham Ihawaf (LBA)

== Final round ==
Semi-finals
19 August
Guinea	60
Senegal	100
19 August
Cameroon	87
Mali	70

Final
20 August
Senegal	74
Cameroon	80

=== Semi-finals ===
19 August 2023
15:00

Boxscore

Cameroon	87–70	Mali
Scoring by quarter: 27–17, 22–19, 22–11, 16–23
Pts: Hill 21; Rebs: Bayehe 8 Asts: Hill 7		Pts: F. Drame 16; Rebs: F. Drame, Sissoko 7 Asts: H. Drame 6

Eko Convention Center, Lagos
Referees: Amr Aboollo (EGY), Amir Taboubi (TUN), Cherubin Leslie (MRI)

19 August 2023
18:00

Boxscore

Guinea	60–100	Senegal
Scoring by quarter: 20–20, 12–25, 13–29, 15–26
Pts: Diallo 18; Rebs: Dramé 11; Asts: Doumbia 5		Pts: Badio 20; Rebs: N'Diaye 10; Asts: Badio, Boissy 8

Eko Convention Center, Lagos
Referees: Hassane Kamaté (CIV), Walelign Gebeto (ETH), Haytham Ihawaf (LBA)

=== Final ===
20 August 2023
16:00

Boxscore

Senegal	74–80	Cameroon
Scoring by quarter: 25–25, 8–22, 21–15, 20–18
Pts: Ndoye 18; Rebs: Ndoye 10; Asts: Badio 6		Pts: Gbetkom 19; Rebs: Eboua 7 Asts: Hill 14

Eko Convention Center, Lagos
Referees: Amr Aboollo (EGY), Antonio Bernando (ANG), Kingsley Ojeaburu (NGA)

== Final standings ==
Rank	Team	Record
1st place, gold medalist(s)	Cameroon	4–0
2nd place, silver medalist(s)	Senegal	3–1
3rd place, bronze medalist(s)	Mali	1–2
4	Guinea	1–2
5	Nigeria	0–2
6	Tunisia	0–2

Qualified for the FIBA Men's Olympic qualifying tournaments
