= 2024 FIBA Men's Pre-Qualifying Olympic Qualifying Tournaments =

2023 FIBA Olympic Pre-Qualifying Tournaments
For Men

Tournament details
- Host country: Argentina; Estonia; Nigeria; Poland; Syria; Turkey
- Dates: 12–20 August 2023
- Teams: 35
- Venue(s): 7 (in 7 host cities)

The 2024 FIBA Men's Pre-Qualifying Olympic Qualifying Tournaments were five basketball tournaments that were contested by 40 national teams, where the top teams earned a place in the 2024 FIBA Men's Olympic Qualifying Tournaments. The tournaments were held between 12 and 20 August 2023.

== Hosts selection ==
The tournaments were held in Nigeria, Argentina, Turkey, Poland, Estonia and an Asian country to be named, which was later announced to be Syria.

== Format ==
There were five qualifying tournaments with the teams split per their continent (Europe had two tournaments) and played a tournament at a single venue. The winning team advanced to the Olympic Qualification tournament.

== Teams ==
Teams that missed out on the 2023 FIBA Basketball World Cup and the next best-ranked team(s) participated in these tournaments.

FIBA Africa	FIBA Americas	FIBA Asia and FIBA Oceania	FIBA Europe	
Senegal	Argentina	Saudi Arabia	Turkey	Estonia
Nigeria	~~Panama~~ (Note: Panama withdrew before the tournament.)	Kazakhstan	Sweden	Czech Republic
Tunisia	Uruguay	India	Hungary	Netherlands
Guinea	Bahamas	Bahrain	Iceland	North Macedonia
~~DR Congo~~ (Note: The Democratic Republic of the Congo withdrew before the tournament.)	Colombia	~~South Korea~~ (Note: South Korea withdrew before the tournament.)	Belgium	Poland
~~Uganda~~ (Note: Uganda withdrew before the tournament.)	Virgin Islands	~~Chinese Taipei~~ (Note: Chinese Taipei withdrew before the tournament.)	Israel	Portugal
Cameroon	Chile	Indonesia	Bosnia and Herzegovina	Croatia (Note: Great Britain withdrew before the start of the tournament and Croatia was named their replacement.)
Mali	Cuba	Syria	Ukraine	Bulgaria (Note: A final decision was made in April, to decline Russia's entry due to the Russian invasion of Ukraine. Bulgaria was the next best ranked European team.)

== Qualifying tournaments ==
=== Africa ===
The tournament was held in Lagos, Nigeria.

==== Group A ====
Pos	Team	Pld	W	L	PF	PA	PD	Pts	Qualification
1	Senegal	2	2	0	167	158	+9	4	Semi-finals
2	Mali	2	1	1	148	142	+6	3	Semi-finals
3	Nigeria (H)	2	0	2	155	170	−15	2	

Source: FIBA
Rules for classification: 1) points; 2) head-to-head points; 3) head-to-head points difference; 4) head-to-head number of points scored.
(H) Hosts

==== Group B ====
Pos	Team	Pld	W	L	PF	PA	PD	Pts	Qualification
1	Cameroon	2	2	0	187	144	+43	4	Semi-finals
2	Guinea	2	1	1	169	190	−21	3	Semi-finals
3	Tunisia	2	0	2	156	178	−22	2	

Source: FIBA
Rules for classification: 1) points; 2) head-to-head points; 3) head-to-head points difference; 4) head-to-head number of points scored.

==== Bracket ====
Semi-finals
19 August
Guinea	60
Senegal	100
19 August
Cameroon	87
Mali	70

Final
20 August
Senegal	74
Cameroon	80

==== Final standings ====
Rank	Team	Record
1st place, gold medalist(s)	Cameroon	4–0
2nd place, silver medalist(s)	Senegal	3–1
3rd place, bronze medalist(s)	Mali	1–2
4	Guinea	1–2
5	Nigeria	0–2
6	Tunisia	0–2

Qualified for the FIBA Men's Olympic qualifying tournaments

=== Americas ===
The tournament was held in Santiago del Estero, Argentina.

==== Group A ====
Pos	Team	Pld	W	L	PF	PA	PD	Pts	Qualification
1	Bahamas	2	2	0	210	157	+53	4	Semi-finals
2	Argentina (H)	2	1	1	198	167	+31	3	Semi-finals
3	Cuba	2	0	2	134	218	−84	2	

Source: FIBA
Rules for classification: 1) points; 2) head-to-head points; 3) head-to-head points difference; 4) head-to-head number of points scored.
(H) Hosts

==== Group B ====
Pos	Team	Pld	W	L	PF	PA	PD	Pts	Qualification
1	Chile	3	3	0	217	196	+21	6	Semi-finals
2	Uruguay	3	1	2	215	212	+3	4 (Note: Tied on head to head points. Head to head points difference: Uruguay +11, Colombia +8, Virgin Islands −19.)	Semi-finals
3	Colombia	3	1	2	227	231	−4	4	
4	Virgin Islands	3	1	2	204	224	−20	4	

Source: FIBA
Rules for classification: 1) points; 2) head-to-head points; 3) head-to-head points difference; 4) head-to-head number of points scored.

==== Bracket ====
Semi-finals
19 August
Uruguay	62
Bahamas	78
19 August
Chile	79
Argentina	87

Final
20 August
Bahamas	82
Argentina	75

==== Final standings ====
Rank	Team	Record
1st place, gold medalist(s)	Bahamas	4–0
2nd place, silver medalist(s)	Argentina	2–2
3rd place, bronze medalist(s)	Chile	3–1
4	Uruguay	1–3
5	Colombia	1–2
6	Virgin Islands	1–2
7	Cuba	0–2

Qualified for the FIBA Men's Olympic qualifying tournaments

=== Asia ===
The tournament was held in Damascus, Syria.

==== Round robin ====
Pos	Team	Pld	W	L	PF	PA	PD	Pts	Qualification
1	Bahrain	5	5	0	458	339	+119	10	Olympic Qualifying Tournaments
2	Saudi Arabia	5	3	2	402	375	+27	8	
3	India	5	2	3	386	392	−6	7 (Note: Head-to-head points difference: India +13, Kazakhstan −6, Indonesia −7.)	
4	Kazakhstan	5	2	3	373	414	−41	7	
5	Indonesia	5	2	3	393	431	−38	7	
6	Syria (H)	5	1	4	355	416	−61	6	

Source: FIBA
Rules for classification: 1) points; 2) head-to-head points; 3) head-to-head points difference; 4) head-to-head number of points scored.
(H) Hosts

=== Europe 1 ===
The tournament was held in Tallinn, Estonia.

==== Group A ====
Pos	Team	Pld	W	L	PF	PA	PD	Pts	Qualification
1	Israel	3	2	1	231	199	+32	5 (Note: Tied on head to head points. Head to head points difference: Israel +11, Estonia −1, Czech Republic −10.)	Semi-finals
2	Estonia (H)	3	2	1	224	201	+23	5	Semi-finals
3	Czech Republic	3	2	1	238	236	+2	5	
4	North Macedonia	3	0	3	206	263	−57	3	

Source: FIBA
Rules for classification: 1) points; 2) head-to-head points; 3) head-to-head points difference; 4) head-to-head number of points scored.
(H) Hosts
Notes:

The tournament was held in Gliwice, Poland.

==== Group B ====
Pos	Team	Pld	W	L	PF	PA	PD	Pts	Qualification
1	Poland (H)	3	3	0	246	222	+24	6	Semi-finals
2	Bosnia and Herzegovina	3	2	1	263	238	+25	5	Semi-finals
3	Portugal	3	1	2	226	236	−10	4	
4	Hungary	3	0	3	233	272	−39	3	

Source: FIBA
Rules for classification: 1) points; 2) head-to-head points; 3) head-to-head points difference; 4) head-to-head number of points scored.
(H) Hosts

==== Bracket ====
Semi-finals
18 August
Bosnia and Herzegovina	86
Israel	77
18 August
Poland	93
Estonia	83

Final
20 August
Bosnia and Herzegovina	72
Poland	76

==== Final standings ====
Rank	Team	Record
1st place, gold medalist(s)	Poland	5–0
2nd place, silver medalist(s)	Bosnia and Herzegovina	3–2
3rd place, bronze medalist(s)	Israel	2–2
4	Estonia	2–2
5	Czech Republic	2–1
6	Portugal	1–2
7	Hungary	0–3
8	North Macedonia	0–3

Qualified for the FIBA Men's Olympic qualifying tournaments

=== Europe 2 ===
The tournament was held in Istanbul, Turkey.

==== Group C ====
Pos	Team	Pld	W	L	PF	PA	PD	Pts	Qualification
1	Turkey (H)	3	3	0	288	210	+78	6	Semi-finals
2	Ukraine	3	2	1	234	225	+9	5	Semi-finals
3	Iceland	3	1	2	234	257	−23	4	
4	Bulgaria	3	0	3	213	277	−64	3	

Source: FIBA
Rules for classification: 1) points; 2) head-to-head points; 3) head-to-head points difference; 4) head-to-head number of points scored.
(H) Hosts

==== Group D ====
Pos	Team	Pld	W	L	PF	PA	PD	Pts	Qualification
1	Croatia	3	3	0	274	203	+71	6	Semi-finals
2	Sweden	3	2	1	237	266	−29	5	Semi-finals
3	Netherlands	3	1	2	248	256	−8	4	
4	Belgium	3	0	3	209	243	−34	3	

Source: FIBA
Rules for classification: 1) points; 2) head-to-head points; 3) head-to-head points difference; 4) head-to-head number of points scored.

==== Bracket ====
Semi-finals
18 August
Sweden	84
Turkey	105
18 August
Croatia	85
Ukraine	70

Final
20 August
Turkey	71
Croatia	84

==== Final standings ====
Rank	Team	Record
1st place, gold medalist(s)	Croatia	5–0
2nd place, silver medalist(s)	Turkey	4–1
3rd place, bronze medalist(s)	Ukraine	2–2
4	Sweden	2–2
5	Netherlands	1–2
6	Iceland	1–2
7	Belgium	0–3
8	Bulgaria	0–3

Qualified for the FIBA Men's Olympic qualifying tournaments

== See also ==
- Basketball at the 2024 Summer Olympics – Men's qualification
