= 2024 FIBA Men's Olympic Qualifying Tournaments =

2024 FIBA Olympic Qualifying Tournaments
For Men

Tournament details
- Host country: Spain; Latvia; Greece; Puerto Rico
- Dates: 2–7 July 2024
- Teams: 24

The 2024 FIBA Men's Olympic Qualifying Tournaments were four basketball tournaments contested by 24 national teams, where the four top teams earned a place in the 2024 Summer Olympics basketball tournament. They took place from 2 to 7 July 2024 in Greece, Latvia, Puerto Rico, and Spain.

Brazil, Greece, Puerto Rico and Spain qualified for the Olympics.

== Teams ==
The FIBA Olympic Qualifying Tournaments included the 16 best-placed non-qualified teams from the 2023 FIBA Basketball World Cup and three highest-ranked countries per region in the FIBA World Ranking.

The five other teams were determined through the Olympic Pre-Qualifying Tournaments.

Qualification method	Places	Qualified team
2023 FIBA Basketball World Cup
Highest-ranked eligible team – Africa	1	Egypt
Highest-ranked eligible team – Americas	1	Puerto Rico
Highest-ranked eligible team – Asia and Oceania	1	New Zealand
Top 16 eligible teams	16	Latvia
Top 16 eligible teams	16	Lithuania
Top 16 eligible teams	16	Slovenia
Top 16 eligible teams	16	Italy
Top 16 eligible teams	16	Spain
Top 16 eligible teams	16	Montenegro
Top 16 eligible teams	16	Brazil
Top 16 eligible teams	16	Dominican Republic
Top 16 eligible teams	16	Greece
Top 16 eligible teams	16	Georgia
Top 16 eligible teams	16	Finland
Top 16 eligible teams	16	Lebanon
Top 16 eligible teams	16	Philippines
Top 16 eligible teams	16	Mexico
Top 16 eligible teams	16	Angola
Top 16 eligible teams	16	Ivory Coast
2024 FIBA Olympic Pre-Qualifying Tournaments (OPQT)
Winner – FIBA Africa	1	Cameroon
Winner – FIBA Americas	1	Bahamas
Winner – FIBA Asia	1	Bahrain
Winner – FIBA Europe (OPQT1)	1	Poland
Winner – FIBA Europe (OPQT2)	1	Croatia
Total	24	

== Draw ==
The draw for the Olympic qualifiers took place in Mies, Switzerland on 27 November 2023 (19:00 CET).

=== Seeding ===
The latest ranking before the draw served as the basis to determine the pots for the draw (seeding in brackets).

There were four tournaments, with teams to be drawn into two groups of three teams per tournament. Group As drew teams from pots 1, 4, 5, while Group Bs had teams from pots 2, 3, 6.

Also for "geographical balance" purposes, a group could only have a maximum of two European teams and one Americas team. Each tournament could only have a maximum of three European teams, one Asia or Oceania team, and one African team.

Pot 1	Pot 2	Pot 3	Pot 4	Pot 5	Pot 6
Spain (2); Latvia (8); Lithuania (10); Slovenia (11)	Brazil (12); Italy (13); Greece (14); Poland (15)	Puerto Rico (16); Montenegro (17); Dominican Republic (18); Finland (20)	New Zealand (21); Georgia (23); Mexico (25); Lebanon (28)	Croatia (30); Ivory Coast (33); Angola (34); Philippines (38)	Egypt (41); Bahamas (57); Cameroon (67); Bahrain (69)

== Qualifying tournaments ==
=== Tournament 1 ===
The tournament was held in Valencia, Spain.

==== Preliminary round ====
===== Group A =====
Pos	Team	Pld	W	L	PF	PA	PD	Pts	Qualification
1	Spain (H)	2	2	0	193	140	+53	4	Semi-finals
2	Lebanon	2	1	1	133	174	−41	3	Semi-finals
3	Angola	2	0	2	151	163	−12	2	

Source: FIBA
(H) Hosts

===== Group B =====
Pos	Team	Pld	W	L	PF	PA	PD	Pts	Qualification
1	Bahamas	2	2	0	186	166	+20	4	Semi-finals
2	Finland	2	1	1	174	184	−10	3	Semi-finals
3	Poland	2	0	2	169	179	−10	2	

Source: FIBA

==== Final round ====
Semi-finals
6 July
Finland	74
Spain	81
6 July
Bahamas	89
Lebanon	72

Final
7 July
Spain	86
Bahamas	78

==== Final ranking ====
Pos	Team	Pld	W	L	Qualification
1	Spain	4	4	0	Qualified for the Olympics
2	Bahamas	4	3	1	
3	Finland	3	1	2	
4	Lebanon	3	1	2	
5	Poland	2	0	2	
6	Angola	2	0	2	

Source: FIBA

=== Tournament 2 ===
The tournament was held in Riga, Latvia.

==== Preliminary round ====
===== Group A =====
Pos	Team	Pld	W	L	PF	PA	PD	Pts	Qualification
1	Latvia (H)	2	1	1	163	144	+19	3	Semi-finals
2	Philippines	2	1	1	183	176	+7	3	Semi-finals
3	Georgia	2	1	1	151	177	−26	3	

Source: FIBA
(H) Hosts

===== Group B =====
Pos	Team	Pld	W	L	PF	PA	PD	Pts	Qualification
1	Brazil	2	1	1	155	149	+6	3	Semi-finals
2	Cameroon	2	1	1	143	144	−1	3	Semi-finals
3	Montenegro	2	1	1	142	147	−5	3	

Source: FIBA

==== Final round ====
Semi-finals
6 July
Cameroon	59
Latvia	72
6 July
Brazil	71
Philippines	60

Final
7 July
Latvia	69
Brazil	94

==== Final ranking ====
Pos	Team	Pld	W	L	Qualification
1	Brazil	4	3	1	Qualified for the Olympics
2	Latvia	4	2	2	
3	Philippines	3	1	2	
4	Cameroon	3	1	2	
5	Montenegro	2	1	1	
6	Georgia	2	1	1	

Source: FIBA

=== Tournament 3 ===
The tournament was held in Piraeus, Greece.

==== Preliminary round ====
===== Group A =====
Pos	Team	Pld	W	L	PF	PA	PD	Pts	Qualification
1	Croatia	2	1	1	194	182	+12	3	Semi-finals
2	Slovenia	2	1	1	196	186	+10	3	Semi-finals
3	New Zealand	2	1	1	168	190	−22	3	

Source: FIBA

===== Group B =====
Pos	Team	Pld	W	L	PF	PA	PD	Pts	Qualification
1	Greece (H)	2	2	0	202	153	+49	4	Semi-finals
2	Dominican Republic	2	1	1	172	186	−14	3	Semi-finals
3	Egypt	2	0	2	148	183	−35	2	

Source: FIBA
(H) Hosts

==== Final round ====
Semi-finals
6 July
Dominican Republic	77
Croatia	80
6 July
Greece	96
Slovenia	68

Final
7 July
Croatia	69
Greece	80

==== Final ranking ====
Pos	Team	Pld	W	L	Qualification
1	Greece	4	4	0	Qualified for the Olympics
2	Croatia	4	2	2	
3	Dominican Republic	3	1	2	
4	Slovenia	3	1	2	
5	New Zealand	2	1	1	
6	Egypt	2	0	2	

Source: FIBA

=== Tournament 4 ===
The tournament was held in San Juan, Puerto Rico.

==== Preliminary round ====
===== Group A =====
Pos	Team	Pld	W	L	PF	PA	PD	Pts	Qualification
1	Lithuania	2	2	0	193	177	+16	4	Semi-finals
2	Mexico	2	1	1	176	177	−1	3	Semi-finals
3	Ivory Coast	2	0	2	174	189	−15	2	

Source: FIBA

===== Group B =====
Pos	Team	Pld	W	L	PF	PA	PD	Pts	Qualification
1	Puerto Rico (H)	2	2	0	179	125	+54	4	Semi-finals
2	Italy	2	1	1	183	133	+50	3	Semi-finals
3	Bahrain	2	0	2	109	213	−104	2	

Source: FIBA
(H) Hosts

==== Final round ====
Semi-finals
6 July
Italy	64
Lithuania	88
6 July
Puerto Rico	98
Mexico	78

Final
7 July
Lithuania	68
Puerto Rico	79

==== Final ranking ====
Pos	Team	Pld	W	L	Qualification
1	Puerto Rico	4	4	0	Qualified for the Olympics
2	Lithuania	4	3	1	
3	Italy	3	1	2	
4	Mexico	3	1	2	
5	Ivory Coast	2	0	2	
6	Bahrain	2	0	2	

Source: FIBA
