= 2024 FIBA Men's Pre-Qualifying Olympic Qualifying Tournaments – Americas =

2024 FIBA Men's Pre-Qualifying Olympic Qualifying Tournaments
Tournament details
- Host country: Argentina
- City: Santiago del Estero; La Banda
- Dates: 14–20 August 2023
- Teams: 7 (from 1 confederation)
- Venues: 2 (in 2 host cities)

Final positions
- Champions: Bahamas

Tournament statistics
- Top scorer: (The Bahamas) Eric Gordon (20.3 ppg)
- Top rebounds: (The Bahamas) Deandre Ayton (13.8 rpg)
- Top assists: (Argentina) Facundo Campazzo (11.8 apg)

Official website
- OPQT Argentina

The 2024 FIBA Men's Pre-Qualifying Olympic Qualifying Tournaments in Americas was one of five 2024 FIBA Men's Pre-Qualifying Olympic Qualifying Tournaments. The tournament was held from 14 to 20 August 2023 in Santiago del Estero, Argentina. Bahamas, as the winner, qualified for the 2024 FIBA Men's Olympic Qualifying Tournaments.

== Teams ==
Teams that missed out on the 2023 FIBA Basketball World Cup and the next best-ranked team will participate.

Qualification method		Places	Qualified team
2023 FIBA World Cup Qualifiers – Americas	4th (worst-ranked)	1	Argentina
2023 FIBA World Cup Qualifiers – Americas	5th	2	~~Panama~~
2023 FIBA World Cup Qualifiers – Americas	5th	2	Uruguay
2023 FIBA World Cup Qualifiers – Americas	6th	2	Bahamas
2023 FIBA World Cup Qualifiers – Americas	6th	2	Colombia
FIBA World Rankings – Americas (November 2022)		3	Virgin Islands
FIBA World Rankings – Americas (November 2022)		3	Chile
FIBA World Rankings – Americas (November 2022)		3	Cuba
Total		8	

Panama withdrew before the tournament.

== Draw ==
The draw took place on 1 May 2023.

=== Seeding ===
The seedings were announced on 29 April 2023.

Pot 1	Pot 2	Pot 3	Pot 4
Argentina; Uruguay	~~Panama~~; Colombia	Bahamas; Virgin Islands	Chile; Cuba

== Preliminary round ==
All times are local (UTC−3).

=== Group A ===
Pos	Team	Pld	W	L	PF	PA	PD	Pts	Qualification
1	Bahamas	2	2	0	210	157	+53	4	Semi-finals
2	Argentina (H)	2	1	1	198	167	+31	3	Semi-finals
3	Cuba	2	0	2	134	218	−84	2	

Source: FIBA
Rules for classification: 1) points; 2) head-to-head points; 3) head-to-head points difference; 4) head-to-head number of points scored.
(H) Hosts

14 August 2023
19:10

Boxscore

Cuba	68–109	Bahamas
Scoring by quarter: 16–20, 12–26, 18–33, 22–30
Pts: Guzmán 16; Rebs: Bombino 5 Asts: three players 3		Pts: Hield 24; Rebs: Ayton 10; Asts: Nairn 7

Estadio Ciudad de Santiago del Estero, Santiago del Estero
Referees: Jesed Díaz (PUR), Nathaniel Saunders (CAN), Teresa Stuck (CAN)

16 August 2023
21:10

Boxscore

Bahamas	101–89	Argentina
Scoring by quarter: 25–37, 30–16, 27–14, 19–22
Pts: Gordon 24; Rebs: Ayton 15; Asts: Nairn 7		Pts: Brussino 21; Rebs: Brussino 7 Asts: Campazzo 10

Estadio Ciudad de Santiago del Estero, Santiago del Estero
Referees: Krishna Domínguez (MEX), Alan Dos Santos (BRA), Carmelo De La Rosa (PUR)

17 August 2023
22:10

Boxscore

Cuba	66–109	Argentina
Scoring by quarter: 24–29, 17–21, 14–32, 11–27
Pts: Coutin 15; Rebs: Chacón 7 Asts: Chacón 4		Pts: Redivo 20; Rebs: Vildoza 9 Asts: Campazzo 8

Estadio Vicente Rosales, La Banda
Referees: Alexis Mercado (PUR), Felipe Ibarra (CHI), Orlando Varela (HON)

=== Group B ===
Pos	Team	Pld	W	L	PF	PA	PD	Pts	Qualification
1	Chile	3	3	0	217	196	+21	6	Semi-finals
2	Uruguay	3	1	2	215	212	+3	4 (Note: Tied on head to head points. Head to head points difference: Uruguay +11, Colombia +8, Virgin Islands −19.)	Semi-finals
3	Colombia	3	1	2	227	231	−4	4	
4	Virgin Islands	3	1	2	204	224	−20	4	

Source: FIBA
Rules for classification: 1) points; 2) head-to-head points; 3) head-to-head points difference; 4) head-to-head number of points scored.
Notes:

14 August 2023
17:10

Boxscore

Virgin Islands	61–62	Chile
Scoring by quarter: 17–18, 11–19, 22–13, 11–12
Pts: Corbett 22; Rebs: Smith 13; Asts: Arnold, Nesbitt 3		Pts: Carvacho 23; Rebs: Carvacho 8 Asts: Haase 8

Estadio Vicente Rosales, La Banda
Referees: Grant Todey (USA), Carmelo De La Rosa (PUR), Franco Anselmo (ARG)

14 August 2023
19:40

Boxscore

Uruguay	80–65	Colombia
Scoring by quarter: 19–27, 19–12, 12–13, 30–13
Pts: Rodríguez 19; Rebs: Rojas 12; Asts: Pomoli 11		Pts: Jackson 28; Rebs: Echenique 8 Asts: three players 3

Estadio Vicente Rosales, La Banda
Referees: Krishna Domínguez (MEX), Alan Dos Santos (BRA), Franco Ronconi (ARG)

15 August 2023
18:10

Boxscore

Colombia	97–74	Virgin Islands
Scoring by quarter: 17–31, 25–9, 26–16, 29–18
Pts: Echenique 20; Rebs: Echenique 8 Asts: Roque 4		Pts: Corbett 19; Rebs: Corbett, Jules 6 Asts: Smith 4

Estadio Vicente Rosales, La Banda
Referees: Alexis Mercado (PUR), Orlando Varela (HON), Fernando Leite (BRA)

15 August 2023
20:40

Boxscore

Chile	78–70	Uruguay
Scoring by quarter: 18–14, 27–28, 16–19, 17–9
Pts: Haase, Herrera 18; Rebs: Carvacho 7 Asts: Arroyo 4		Pts: Pomoli 19; Rebs: three players 6 Asts: Rodríguez 5

Estadio Vicente Rosales, La Banda
Referees: Jesed Díaz (PUR), Nathaniel Saunders (CAN), Samuel Hidalgo (DOM)

17 August 2023
17:10

Boxscore

Chile	77–65	Colombia
Scoring by quarter: 18–24, 19–22, 23–6, 17–13
Pts: Carvacho 17; Rebs: Carvacho 6 Asts: Herrera 5		Pts: Jackson 19; Rebs: Echenique, Ibargüen 7 Asts: Atencia, Jackson 3

Estadio Vicente Rosales, La Banda
Referees: Krishna Domínguez (MEX), Franco Ronconi (ARG), Fernando Leite (BRA)

17 August 2023
19:40

Boxscore

Uruguay	65–69	Virgin Islands
Scoring by quarter: 16–13, 16–22, 16–12, 17–22
Pts: Serres 16; Rebs: Calfani 9 Asts: Wachsmann 4		Pts: Arnold 14; Rebs: Hansen 7 Asts: Arnold 4

Estadio Vicente Rosales, La Banda
Referees: Grant Todey (USA), José Fernández (CRC), Teresa Stuck (CAN)

== Final round ==
Semi-finals
19 August
Uruguay	62
Bahamas	78
19 August
Chile	79
Argentina	87

Final
20 August
Bahamas	82
Argentina	75

=== Semi-finals ===
19 August 2023
18:10

Boxscore

Chile	79–87	Argentina
Scoring by quarter: 20–25, 20–21, 16–22, 23–19
Pts: Carvacho 23; Rebs: Carvacho, Herrera 5 Asts: Arroyo 7		Pts: Deck 24; Rebs: Brussino 12; Asts: Campazzo 12

Estadio Ciudad de Santiago del Estero, Santiago del Estero
Referees: Jesed Díaz (PUR), Nathaniel Saunders (CAN), Alan Dos Santos (BRA)

19 August 2023
21:10

Boxscore

Uruguay	62–78	Bahamas
Scoring by quarter: 12–23, 11–20, 11–16, 28–19
Pts: Iglesias 20; Rebs: three players 5 Asts: Zanotta 4		Pts: Hield 17; Rebs: Ayton 9 Asts: Miller Jr. 4

Estadio Ciudad de Santiago del Estero, Santiago del Estero
Referees: Krishna Domínguez (MEX), Alexis Mercado (PUR), Teresa Stuck (CAN)

=== Final ===
20 August 2023
21:10

Boxscore

Bahamas	82–75	Argentina
Scoring by quarter: 22–26, 20–16, 17–21, 23–12
Pts: Gordon 27; Rebs: Ayton 21; Asts: Hield, Nairn 3		Pts: Deck 21; Rebs: Brussino 9 Asts: Campazzo 17

Estadio Ciudad de Santiago del Estero, Santiago del Estero
Referees: Krishna Domínguez (MEX), Grant Todey (USA), Carmelo De La Rosa (PUR)

== Final standings ==
Rank	Team	Record
1st place, gold medalist(s)	Bahamas	4–0
2nd place, silver medalist(s)	Argentina	2–2
3rd place, bronze medalist(s)	Chile	3–1
4	Uruguay	1–3
5	Colombia	1–2
6	Virgin Islands	1–2
7	Cuba	0–2

Qualified for the FIBA Men's Olympic qualifying tournaments
