= Ousmane N'Diaye (basketball) =

Senegalese basketball player

No. 19 – Kentucky Wildcats
- Position: Center
- Conference: Southeastern Conference

Personal information
- Born: 19 March 2004 (age 22) Guediawaye, Senegal
- Listed height: 7 ft 0 in (2.13 m)
- Listed weight: 220 lb (100 kg)

Career information
- College: Kentucky (2026–present)
- NBA draft: 2025: undrafted
- Playing career: 2021–present

Career history
- 2021–2022: Dragons Rhöndorf
- 2022–2025: Saski Baskonia
- 2023–2024: →Palencia Baloncesto
- 2025: →Granada
- 2025–2026: Vanoli Cremona
Medals
Men's basketball
Representing Senegal
AfroBasket
Bronze medal – third place	2025 Angola

Ousmane N'Diaye (born March 19, 2004) is a Senegalese college basketball player for the Kentucky Wildcats of the Southeastern Conference (SEC).

== Professional career ==
In 2016, he was announced as one of 87 participants in the Basketball Without Borders camp in Angola. In February 2020, the then 15-year old N'Diaye was highlighted by ESPN. He was described as "one of the best long-term prospects we evaluated."

On April 24, 2023, N'Diaye declared for the 2023 NBA draft but withdrew before the deadline.

On July 23, 2025, N'Diaye signed with Vanoli Cremona.
