= Jeremiah Hill (basketball) =

American basketball player

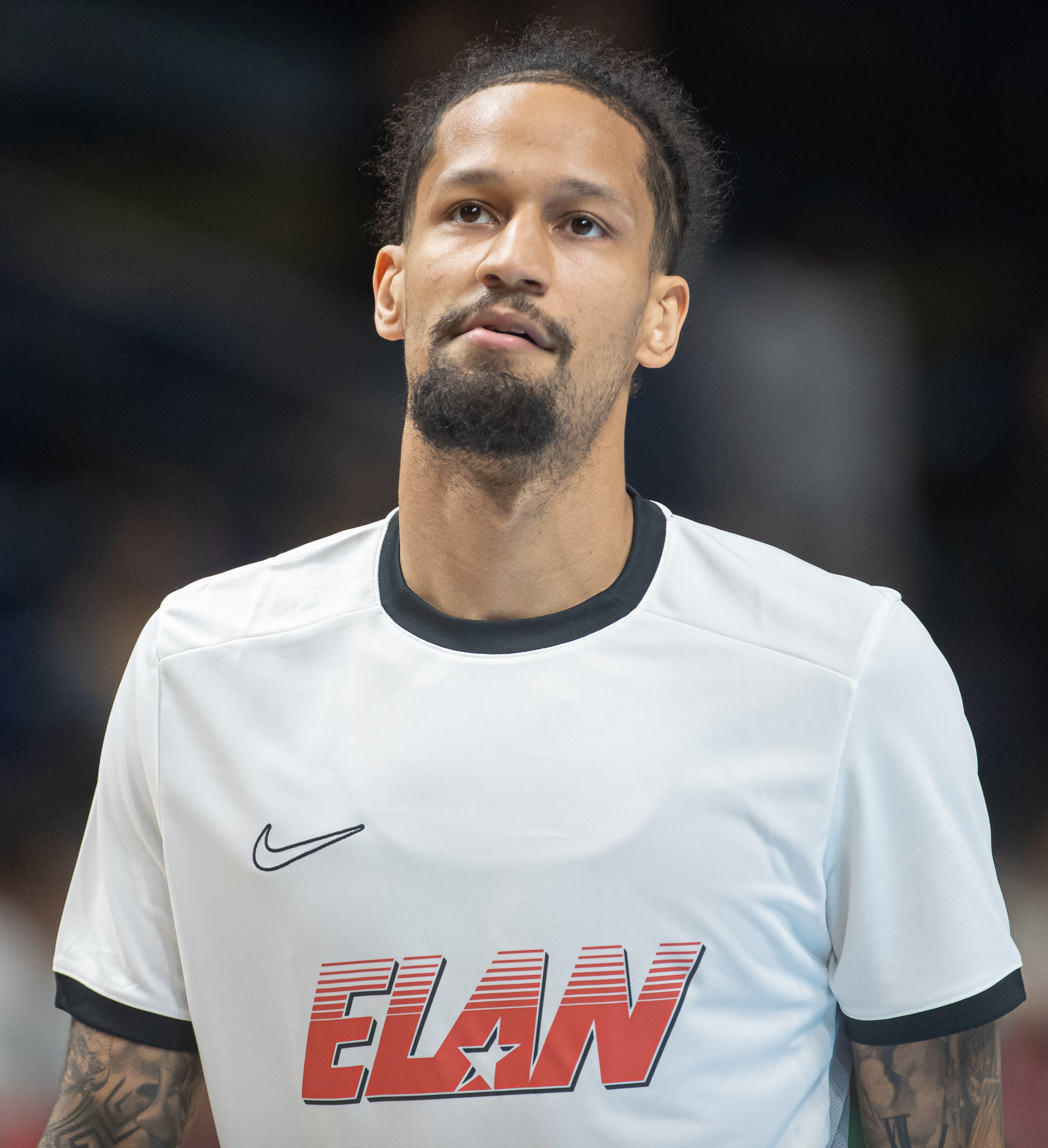
- Hill with Élan Chalon in 2025

No. 8 – Élan Chalon
- Position: Shooting guard
- League: LNB Élite; Champions League

Personal information
- Born: September 4, 1995 (age 31)
- Listed height: 6 ft 2 in (1.88 m)
- Listed weight: 170 lb (77 kg)

Career information
- High school: Richmond Hill (Richmond Hill, Georgia)
- College: Savannah State (2013–2014); Valdosta State (2014–2017)
- NBA draft: 2017: undrafted
- Playing career: 2017–present

Career history
- 2017–2018: Jacksonville Giants
- 2018–2019: Lakeland Magic
- 2019–2021: BC Astana
- 2021–2022: Parma Basket
- 2022: BCM Gravelines-Dunkerque
- 2022–2023: Real Betis
- 2023: Bàsquet Girona
- 2023–2024: Runa Basket Moscow
- 2024–present: Élan Chalon

Career highlights
- Kazakhstan League champion (2021); ABA champion (2018)

Jeremiah Devonte Hill (born September 4, 1995) is an American-born Cameroonian professional basketball guard for Élan Chalon of the LNB Élite and the Champions League.

== Professional career ==
Hill attended Richmond Hill High School and in 2013 committed to play college basketball at Savannah State. Hill later transferred to Valdosta State, where in 2017 he was named to the 2017 NABC Coaches Division-II All American Team. Hill averaged 19.6 points, 5.5 rebounds and 4.3 assists per game as a senior.

Hill then played a season with the Jacksonville Giants of the American Basketball Association (ABA). He won the ABA championship with Jacksonville in 2018. On April 10, 2018, Hill signed with the Lakeland Magic. During a February 6, 2019 game against the Maine Red Claws, Hill scored a career high 30 points, including eight three-point shots, during 24 minutes of play. In July 2019, Hill signed with BC Astana in Kazakhstan. He helped Astana win the 2021 national championship and received 2020-21 Asia-Basket.com All-Kazakhstan League Player of the Year and Finals MVP honours.

On July 24, 2021, he signed with Parma Basket of the VTB United League. On March 9, 2022, he moved to BCM Gravelines-Dunkerque of the French ProA to replace injured Marcquise Reed.

On July 22, 2022, he signed a contract to move to Seville to play for Real Betis of the Liga ACB.

On January 7, 2023, he signed with Bàsquet Girona of the Liga ACB. He moved to Runa Basket Moscow of the VTB United League for the 2023-24 campaign. On June 22, 2024, Hill signed a deal with Élan Chalon of the Ligue nationale de basket.

On July 22, 2024, he signed with Élan Chalon of the LNB Pro A.

== National team ==
Hill was selected to play for the Cameroonian men's national team.
