= 2024 FIBA Men's Pre-Qualifying Olympic Qualifying Tournaments – Europe =

2024 FIBA Men's Pre-Qualifying Olympic Qualifying Tournaments
Tournament details
- Host country: Turkey; Poland; Estonia
- City: Istanbul; Gliwice; Tallinn
- Dates: 12–20 August 2023
- Teams: 16 (from 1 confederation)
- Venue(s): 3 (in 3 host cities)

Official website
- OPQT Poland-Estonia; OPQT Türkiye

The 2024 FIBA Men's Pre-Qualifying Olympic Qualifying Tournaments in Europe was one of five 2024 FIBA Men's Pre-Qualifying Olympic Qualifying Tournaments. The tournament was held from 12 to 20 August 2023. Two tournaments were held, with the winning team of each tournament qualifying for the 2024 FIBA Men's Olympic Qualifying Tournaments. Gliwice, Poland and Tallinn, Estonia hosted the first tournament and Istanbul, Turkey hosted the second one.

Poland and Croatia were the winners of the tournaments, defeating Bosnia and Herzegovina and Turkey respectively in the finals.

== Teams ==
Teams that missed out on the 2023 FIBA Basketball World Cup and the next best-ranked team will participate.

Qualification method		Places	Qualified team
2023 FIBA World Cup Qualifiers – Europe	4th	4	Turkey
2023 FIBA World Cup Qualifiers – Europe	4th	4	Sweden
2023 FIBA World Cup Qualifiers – Europe	4th	4	Hungary
2023 FIBA World Cup Qualifiers – Europe	4th	4	Iceland
2023 FIBA World Cup Qualifiers – Europe	5th	4	Belgium
2023 FIBA World Cup Qualifiers – Europe	5th	4	Israel
2023 FIBA World Cup Qualifiers – Europe	5th	4	Bosnia and Herzegovina
2023 FIBA World Cup Qualifiers – Europe	5th	4	Ukraine
2023 FIBA World Cup Qualifiers – Europe	6th	4	~~Great Britain~~ (Note: Great Britain withdrew before the start of the tournament.)
2023 FIBA World Cup Qualifiers – Europe	6th	4	Estonia
2023 FIBA World Cup Qualifiers – Europe	6th	4	Czech Republic
2023 FIBA World Cup Qualifiers – Europe	6th	4	Netherlands
EuroBasket 2025 Pre-Qualifiers	1st	3	North Macedonia
EuroBasket 2025 Pre-Qualifiers	1st	3	Poland
EuroBasket 2025 Pre-Qualifiers	1st	3	Portugal
Replacement of Great Britain		1	Croatia
FIBA World Rankings – Europe (November 2022)		1	Bulgaria (Note: A final decision was made in April, to decline Russia's entry due to the Russian invasion of Ukraine. Bulgaria was the next best ranked European team.)
Total		16	

== Draw ==
The draw took place on 1 May 2023.

=== Seeding ===
The seedings were announced on 29 April 2023.

Tournament 1 (Poland/Estonia)

Pot 1	Pot 2	Pot 3	Pot 4
Czech Republic; Poland	Israel; Bosnia and Herzegovina	Hungary; Estonia	North Macedonia; Portugal

Tournament 2 (Turkey)

Pot 1	Pot 2	Pot 3	Pot 4
Turkey; Croatia	Ukraine; Belgium	Netherlands; Bulgaria	Iceland; Sweden

== Tournament 1 ==
OPQT Poland-Estonia
Tournament details
- Host country: Poland; Estonia
- City: Gliwice; Tallinn
- Dates: 12–20 August 2023
- Teams: 8 (from 1 confederation)
- Venue(s): 2 (in 2 host cities)

Final positions
- Champions: Poland

Tournament statistics
- Top scorer: (North Macedonia) T. J. Shorts (20.0 ppg)
- Top rebounds: (Bosnia and Herzegovina) Jusuf Nurkić (10.0 rpg)
- Top assists: (Bosnia and Herzegovina) Edin Atić (7.0 apg)

Official website
- OPQT Poland-Estonia

=== Preliminary round ===
All times are local (UTC+2 in Poland, UTC+3 in Estonia).

The tournament was held in Tallinn, Estonia.

==== Group A ====
Pos	Team	Pld	W	L	PF	PA	PD	Pts	Qualification
1	Israel	3	2	1	231	199	+32	5 (Note: Tied on head to head points. Head to head points difference: Israel +11, Estonia −1, Czech Republic −10.)	Semi-finals
2	Estonia (H)	3	2	1	224	201	+23	5	Semi-finals
3	Czech Republic	3	2	1	238	236	+2	5	
4	North Macedonia	3	0	3	206	263	−57	3	

Source: FIBA
Rules for classification: 1) points; 2) head-to-head points; 3) head-to-head points difference; 4) head-to-head number of points scored.
(H) Hosts
Notes:

12 August 2023
16:00

Boxscore

Czech Republic	77–74	Estonia
Scoring by quarter: 23–23, 19–16, 14–17, 21–18
Pts: Krejčí 20; Rebs: Peterka 8 Asts: Krejčí 6		Pts: Konontšuk 16; Rebs: Raieste 6 Asts: Kullamäe 5

Tondiraba Ice Hall, Tallinn
Attendance: 3,654
Referees: Aleksandar Glišić (SRB), Mārtiņš Kozlovskis (LAT), Gintaras Mačiulis (LTU)

12 August 2023
19:00

Boxscore

North Macedonia	65–86	Israel
Scoring by quarter: 19–24, 19–23, 13–25, 14–14
Pts: Shorts 22; Rebs: Gjuroski, Simić 5 Asts: Shorts, Stojanovski 3		Pts: Sorkin 21; Rebs: Sorkin, Ziv 7 Asts: Sorkin 5

Tondiraba Ice Hall, Tallinn
Attendance: 395
Referees: Antonio Conde (ESP), Andris Aunkrogers (LAT), Zafer Yılmaz (TUR)

13 August 2023
16:00

Boxscore

Israel	80–67	Czech Republic
Scoring by quarter: 16–12, 28–19, 12–14, 24–22
Pts: Madar 27; Rebs: Kravits 7 Asts: Madar 5		Pts: Kříž 16; Rebs: Kříž 7 Asts: Krejčí, Sehnal 6

Tondiraba Ice Hall, Tallinn
Attendance: 602
Referees: Antonio Conde (ESP), Gatis Saliņš (LAT), Franko Gracin (CRO)

13 August 2023
19:00

Boxscore

Estonia	83–59	North Macedonia
Scoring by quarter: 25–7, 19–15, 21–22, 18–15
Pts: Treier 14; Rebs: Raieste 11; Asts: Kullamäe 9		Pts: Stojanovski 12; Rebs: Magdevski 6 Asts: Magdevski 4

Tondiraba Ice Hall, Tallinn
Attendance: 3,450
Referees: Aleksandar Glišić (SRB), Andris Aunkrogers (LAT), Gizella Györgyi (ROU)

15 August 2023
16:00

Boxscore

Czech Republic	94–82	North Macedonia
Scoring by quarter: 19–16, 26–23, 26–19, 23–24
Pts: Hruban, Kyzlink 18; Rebs: Kříž 10; Asts: Krejčí 8		Pts: Shorts 27; Rebs: Mladenovski 6 Asts: Shorts 5

Tondiraba Ice Hall, Tallinn
Attendance: 673
Referees: Antonio Conde (ESP), Gintaras Mačiulis (LTU), Gatis Saliņš (LAT)

15 August 2023
19:00

Boxscore

Israel	65–67	Estonia
Scoring by quarter: 12–20, 22–16, 16–16, 15–15
Pts: Sorkin 18; Rebs: Sorkin 9 Asts: Madar 7		Pts: Treier 16; Rebs: Drell, Treier 7 Asts: Kullamäe, Raieste 5

Tondiraba Ice Hall, Tallinn
Attendance: 4,834
Referees: Andris Aunkrogers (LAT), Mārtiņš Kozlovskis (LAT), Zafer Yılmaz (TUR)

The tournament was held in Gliwice, Poland.

==== Group B ====
Pos	Team	Pld	W	L	PF	PA	PD	Pts	Qualification
1	Poland (H)	3	3	0	246	222	+24	6	Semi-finals
2	Bosnia and Herzegovina	3	2	1	263	238	+25	5	Semi-finals
3	Portugal	3	1	2	226	236	−10	4	
4	Hungary	3	0	3	233	272	−39	3	

Source: FIBA
Rules for classification: 1) points; 2) head-to-head points; 3) head-to-head points difference; 4) head-to-head number of points scored.
(H) Hosts

13 August 2023
13:30

Boxscore

Poland	83–81	Hungary
Scoring by quarter: 19–19, 19–13, 21–28, 24–21
Pts: Balcerowski 22; Rebs: Balcerowski, Ponitka 6 Asts: Ponitka 10		Pts: Perl 24; Rebs: Golomán, Karahodžić 7 Asts: Somogyi 6

Gliwice Arena, Gliwice
Attendance: 3,082
Referees: Boris Krejić (SLO), Kerem Baki (TUR), Martin Vulić (CRO)

13 August 2023
16:30

Boxscore

Portugal	75–84	Bosnia and Herzegovina
Scoring by quarter: 24–17, 16–20, 14–21, 21–26
Pts: Lisboa 22; Rebs: Brito 8 Asts: three players 4		Pts: Musa 21; Rebs: Garza 12; Asts: Atić 10

Gliwice Arena, Gliwice
Attendance: 1,263
Referees: Gvidas Gedvilas (LTU), Martin Horozov (BUL), Mehmet Karabilecen (TUR)

14 August 2023
17:30

Boxscore

Hungary	74–86	Portugal
Scoring by quarter: 21–22, 21–26, 23–19, 9–19
Pts: Vojvoda 16; Rebs: Golomán 11; Asts: Karahodžić, Somogyi 3		Pts: Brito 17; Rebs: Delgado 6 Asts: Lisboa 7

Gliwice Arena, Gliwice
Attendance: 919
Referees: Boris Krejić (SLO), Ariadna Chueca (ESP), Sergii Zashchuk (UKR)

14 August 2023
20:30

Boxscore

Bosnia and Herzegovina	76–85	Poland
Scoring by quarter: 19–27, 18–23, 18–20, 21–15
Pts: Nurkić 17; Rebs: Nurkić 8 Asts: Atić 8		Pts: Ponitka, Sokołowski 22; Rebs: Ponitka 9 Asts: Ponitka 7

Gliwice Arena, Gliwice
Attendance: 2,859
Referees: Nicolás Maestre (FRA), Kerem Baki (TUR), Gvidas Gedvilas (LTU)

16 August 2023
18:00

Boxscore

Portugal	65–78	Poland
Scoring by quarter: 10–17, 14–18, 17–18, 24–25
Pts: Gameiro 11; Rebs: Voytso 8 Asts: Lisboa 5		Pts: three players 13; Rebs: Balcerowski, Miličić 6 Asts: Pluta 8

Gliwice Arena, Gliwice
Attendance: 2,754
Referees: Nicolás Maestre (FRA), Radomir Vojinović (MNE), Mehmet Karabilecen (TUR)

16 August 2023
21:00

Boxscore

Hungary	78–103	Bosnia and Herzegovina
Scoring by quarter: 16–36, 12–21, 24–26, 26–20
Pts: Perl 21; Rebs: Golomán 5 Asts: Perl 5		Pts: Musa 26; Rebs: Nurkić 10; Asts: Musa 7

Gliwice Arena, Gliwice
Attendance: 764
Referees: Oskars Lucis (LAT), Sergii Zashchuk (UKR), Ariadna Chueca (ESP)

=== Final round ===
Semi-finals
18 August
Bosnia and Herzegovina	86
Israel	77
18 August
Poland	93
Estonia	83

Final
20 August
Bosnia and Herzegovina	72
Poland	76

==== Semi-finals ====
18 August 2023
17:30

Boxscore

Poland	93–83	Estonia
Scoring by quarter: 22–18, 19–17, 22–21, 30–27
Pts: Sokołowski 19; Rebs: Balcerowski, Ponitka 8 Asts: Pluta 7		Pts: Treier 18; Rebs: Treier 6 Asts: Kullamäe 6

Gliwice Arena, Gliwice
Attendance: 2,945
Referees: Nicolás Maestre (FRA), Radomir Vojinović (MNE), Franko Gracin (CRO)

18 August 2023
20:30

Boxscore

Bosnia and Herzegovina	86–77	Israel
Scoring by quarter: 20–22, 16–11, 23–19, 27–25
Pts: Garza 24; Rebs: Nurkić 14; Asts: Musa 5		Pts: Sorkin 28; Rebs: Sorkin 9 Asts: Ziv 8

Gliwice Arena, Gliwice
Attendance: 1,260
Referees: Oskars Lucis (LAT), Zafer Yılmaz (TUR), Sergii Zashchuk (UKR)

==== Final ====
20 August 2023
14:15

Boxscore

Bosnia and Herzegovina	72–76	Poland
Scoring by quarter: 23–23, 16–17, 15–14, 18–22
Pts: Lazić 16; Rebs: Nurkić 12; Asts: Atić 9		Pts: Sokołowski 16; Rebs: Ponitka 8 Asts: Ponitka 5

Gliwice Arena, Gliwice
Attendance: 5,256
Referees: Oskars Lucis (LAT), Nicolás Maestre (FRA), Zafer Yılmaz (TUR)

=== Final standings ===
Rank	Team	Record
1st place, gold medalist(s)	Poland	5–0
2nd place, silver medalist(s)	Bosnia and Herzegovina	3–2
3rd place, bronze medalist(s)	Israel	2–2
4	Estonia	2–2
5	Czech Republic	2–1
6	Portugal	1–2
7	Hungary	0–3
8	North Macedonia	0–3

Qualified for the FIBA Men's Olympic qualifying tournaments

== Tournament 2 ==
OPQT Türkiye
Tournament details
- Host country: Turkey
- City: Istanbul
- Dates: 12–20 August 2023
- Teams: 8 (from 1 confederation)
- Venue(s): 1 (in 1 host city)

Final positions
- Champions: Croatia

Tournament statistics
- Top scorer: (Sweden) Elijah Clarance (19.3 ppg)
- Top rebounds: (Turkey) Ömer Yurtseven (9.8 rpg)
- Top assists: (Ukraine) Oleksandr Kovliar (7.5 apg)

Official website
- OPQT Türkiye

=== Preliminary round ===
All times are local (UTC+3).

==== Group C ====
Pos	Team	Pld	W	L	PF	PA	PD	Pts	Qualification
1	Turkey (H)	3	3	0	288	210	+78	6	Semi-finals
2	Ukraine	3	2	1	234	225	+9	5	Semi-finals
3	Iceland	3	1	2	234	257	−23	4	
4	Bulgaria	3	0	3	213	277	−64	3	

Source: FIBA
Rules for classification: 1) points; 2) head-to-head points; 3) head-to-head points difference; 4) head-to-head number of points scored.
(H) Hosts

12 August 2023
17:00

Boxscore

Ukraine	80–71 (OT)	Bulgaria
Scoring by quarter: 27–10, 13–19, 15–19, 13–20, Overtime: 12–3
Pts: Kovliar 25; Rebs: Bobrov 11; Asts: Kovliar 7		Pts: Ivanov 18; Rebs: Alipiev 10; Asts: Young 8

Sinan Erdem Dome, Istanbul
Attendance: 1,550
Referees: Yohan Rosso (FRA), Luis Castillo (ESP), Michał Proc (POL)

12 August 2023
20:00

Boxscore

Turkey	99–72	Iceland
Scoring by quarter: 20–17, 34–14, 24–20, 21–21
Pts: Hazer, Yurtseven 13; Rebs: Şengün, Yurtseven 7 Asts: Ulubay 4		Pts: Gunnarsson 20; Rebs: Guðmundsson 5 Asts: Birgisson 4

Sinan Erdem Dome, Istanbul
Attendance: 9,500
Referees: Manuel Mazzoni (ITA), Ademir Zurapović (BIH), Paulo Marques (POR)

13 August 2023
18:00

Boxscore

Iceland	69–82	Ukraine
Scoring by quarter: 18–17, 16–26, 16–23, 19–16
Pts: Hlinason 18; Rebs: Hlinason 9 Asts: Guðmundsson, Steinarsson 4		Pts: Kovliar 23; Rebs: Kravtsov 9 Asts: Kovliar 10

Sinan Erdem Dome, Istanbul
Attendance: 1,000
Referees: Manuel Mazzoni (ITA), Péter Praksch (HUN), Ilias Kounelles (CYP)

13 August 2023
20:45

Boxscore

Bulgaria	66–104	Turkey
Scoring by quarter: 13–28, 9–24, 26–29, 18–23
Pts: Simeonov 20; Rebs: Alipiev 6 Asts: Karamfilov 8		Pts: Korkmaz 14; Rebs: Yurtseven 11; Asts: Sipahi 6

Sinan Erdem Dome, Istanbul
Attendance: 6,555
Referees: Ademir Zurapović (BIH), Marius Ciulin (ROU), Ivor Matějek (CZE)

15 August 2023
17:00

Boxscore

Bulgaria	76–93	Iceland
Scoring by quarter: 13–27, 19–23, 24–26, 20–17
Pts: Ivanov 16; Rebs: Simeonov 9 Asts: Young 7		Pts: Þorbjarnarson 17; Rebs: Hlinason 8 Asts: Steinarsson 6

Sinan Erdem Dome, Istanbul
Attendance: 300
Referees: Marius Ciulin (ROU), Dariusz Zapolski (POL), Carsten Straube (GER)

15 August 2023
20:00

Boxscore

Turkey	85–72	Ukraine
Scoring by quarter: 25–25, 24–16, 21–14, 15–17
Pts: Şengün 30; Rebs: Yurtseven 15; Asts: Sipahi 7		Pts: Mishula 14; Rebs: Kravtsov, Krutous 6 Asts: Krutous 6

Sinan Erdem Dome, Istanbul
Attendance: 7,784
Referees: Manuel Mazzoni (ITA), Paulo Marques (POR), Michał Proc (POL)

==== Group D ====
Pos	Team	Pld	W	L	PF	PA	PD	Pts	Qualification
1	Croatia	3	3	0	274	203	+71	6	Semi-finals
2	Sweden	3	2	1	237	266	−29	5	Semi-finals
3	Netherlands	3	1	2	248	256	−8	4	
4	Belgium	3	0	3	209	243	−34	3	

Source: FIBA
Rules for classification: 1) points; 2) head-to-head points; 3) head-to-head points difference; 4) head-to-head number of points scored.

13 August 2023
12:30

Boxscore

Netherlands	89–91 (OT)	Sweden
Scoring by quarter: 20–18, 19–21, 22–27, 20–15, Overtime: 8–10
Pts: Franke 19; Rebs: N'Guessan 9 Asts: Van der Vuurst de Vries 7		Pts: Pantzar 28; Rebs: Ramstedt, Njie 7 Asts: Njie 6

Sinan Erdem Dome, Istanbul
Attendance: 100
Referees: Paulo Marques (POR), Mihkel Männiste (EST), Zdenko Tomašovič (SVK)

13 August 2023
15:15

Boxscore

Croatia	86–55	Belgium
Scoring by quarter: 18–8, 21–10, 30–13, 17–24
Pts: Hezonja 22; Rebs: Zubac 14; Asts: Smith 5		Pts: Lecomte 16; Rebs: De Ridder 11; Asts: Lecomte 4

Sinan Erdem Dome, Istanbul
Attendance: 500
Referees: Yohan Rosso (FRA), Luis Castillo (ESP), Michał Proc (POL)

14 August 2023
17:00

Boxscore

Belgium	76–78	Netherlands
Scoring by quarter: 16–20, 12–25, 27–12, 21–21
Pts: Schwartz 19; Rebs: De Ridder 7 Asts: Lecomte 2		Pts: Edwards, Kloof 16; Rebs: Edwards 8 Asts: Van der Vuurst de Vries 6

Sinan Erdem Dome, Istanbul
Attendance: 100
Referees: Ademir Zurapović (BIH), Luis Castillo (ESP), Marius Ciulin (ROU)

14 August 2023
20:00

Boxscore

Sweden	67–99	Croatia
Scoring by quarter: 22–24, 20–27, 7–21, 18–27
Pts: Clarance 29; Rebs: Hook, Ramstedt 6 Asts: Njie 3		Pts: Smith 24; Rebs: Hezonja 7 Asts: Šarić, Zubac 7

Sinan Erdem Dome, Istanbul
Attendance: 100
Referees: Manuel Mazzoni (ITA), Yohan Rosso (FRA), Paulo Marques (POR)

16 August 2023
17:00

Boxscore

Netherlands	81–89	Croatia
Scoring by quarter: 15–28, 21–20, 26–20, 19–21
Pts: Franke 22; Rebs: Edwards, N'Guessan 8 Asts: Mast, Van der Vuurst de Vries 4		Pts: Zubac 21; Rebs: Šarić 6 Asts: Šarić 12

Sinan Erdem Dome, Istanbul
Attendance: 350
Referees: Manuel Mazzoni (ITA), Marius Ciulin (ROU), Carsten Straube (GER)

16 August 2023
20:00

Boxscore

Belgium	78–79	Sweden
Scoring by quarter: 23–18, 21–25, 21–22, 13–14
Pts: De Ridder 17; Rebs: De Ridder 9 Asts: Schwartz 7		Pts: Clarance 21; Rebs: Spires 6 Asts: Pantzar 5

Sinan Erdem Dome, Istanbul
Attendance: 150
Referees: Ademir Zurapović (BIH), Paulo Marques (POR), Lorenzo Baldini (ITA)

=== Final round ===
Semi-finals
18 August
Sweden	84
Turkey	105
18 August
Croatia	85
Ukraine	70

Final
20 August
Turkey	71
Croatia	84

==== Semi-finals ====
18 August 2023
17:00

Boxscore

Croatia	85–70	Ukraine
Scoring by quarter: 24–17, 18–19, 26–16, 17–18
Pts: Hezonja 22; Rebs: Šarić 8 Asts: three players 3		Pts: Kovliar 20; Rebs: three players 4 Asts: Kovliar 8

Sinan Erdem Dome, Istanbul
Attendance: 2,500
Referees: Paulo Marques (POR), Michał Proc (POL), Marius Ciulin (ROU)

18 August 2023
20:00

Boxscore

Sweden	84–105	Turkey
Scoring by quarter: 19–26, 23–30, 15–24, 27–25
Pts: Clarance 19; Rebs: Clarance 6 Asts: Njie 14		Pts: Korkmaz 18; Rebs: Yurtseven 9 Asts: Ulubay 6

Sinan Erdem Dome, Istanbul
Attendance: 10,000
Referees: Lorenzo Baldini (ITA), Dariusz Zapolski (POL), Carsten Straube (GER)

==== Final ====
20 August 2023
20:00

Boxscore

Turkey	71–84	Croatia
Scoring by quarter: 14–24, 15–24, 26–18, 16–18
Pts: Korkmaz 19; Rebs: Bitim, Yurtseven 7 Asts: three players 3		Pts: Šarić 22; Rebs: Šarić 11; Asts: Kapusta 6

Sinan Erdem Dome, Istanbul
Attendance: 10,000
Referees: Paulo Marques (POR), Lorenzo Baldini (ITA), Michał Proc (POL)

=== Final standings ===
Rank	Team	Record
1st place, gold medalist(s)	Croatia	5–0
2nd place, silver medalist(s)	Turkey	4–1
3rd place, bronze medalist(s)	Ukraine	2–2
4	Sweden	2–2
5	Netherlands	1–2
6	Iceland	1–2
7	Belgium	0–3
8	Bulgaria	0–3

Qualified for the FIBA Men's Olympic qualifying tournaments
