= Starting 5 =

- Genre: Sports; Documentary
- Starring: Season 1: Jimmy Butler; Anthony Edwards; LeBron James; Domantas Sabonis; Jayson Tatum; Season 2: Jaylen Brown; Kevin Durant; Shai Gilgeous-Alexander; Tyrese Haliburton; James Harden
- Country of origin: United States
- Original language: English
- No. of seasons: 2
- No. of episodes: 18

Production
- Executive producers: Maverick Carter; Jamal Henderson; Philip Byron; Randy Mims; Barack Obama; Michelle Obama; Vinnie Malhotra; Ethan Lewis; Peyton Manning; Jamie Horowitz; Sam Pepper
- Running time: 45 minutes
- Production companies: Uninterrupted; Omaha Productions; Higher Ground Productions

Original release
- Network: Netflix
- Release: October 9, 2024 – October 16, 2025

Starting 5 is an American television documentary series developed for Netflix. It follows various National Basketball Association (NBA) players throughout an entire NBA series, delving into their on-court performance and off-court personal lives. NBA player LeBron James' production company Uninterrupted, as well as Omaha Productions and Higher Ground Productions produced the series. James' business partner and friend Maverick Carter serves as an executive producer on the series, as does Omaha's Peyton Manning and Higher Ground's former president Barack and First Lady Michelle Obama.

James starred in the first season alongside Jimmy Butler, Anthony Edwards, Domantas Sabonis, and Jayson Tatum. Released on October 9, 2024, the season had a mixed critical reception. A second and final season starring Jaylen Brown, Kevin Durant, Shai Gilgeous-Alexander, Tyrese Haliburton, and James Harden was released on October 16, 2025.

== Content and cast ==
=== Season 1 ===
Set during the 2023–24 NBA season, the series' first season consists of ten 45-minute episodes. LeBron James, playing for the Los Angeles Lakers, is one of the five players followed throughout the season. The other players featured are Jimmy Butler of the Miami Heat, Anthony Edwards of the Minnesota Timberwolves, Domantas Sabonis of the Sacramento Kings, and Jayson Tatum of the Boston Celtics.

The personal lives of the five players were significantly featured during the season. Included in the season were Butler's agent notifying him on his father being diagnosed with a terminal illness, as well as James and his wife Savannah reflecting on their son Bronny suffering a cardiac arrest in July 2023. Another topic explored in the season is Edwards' girlfriend giving birth and his resulting fatherhood. Some of the series' moments covering Sabonis are told through his wife's perspective; Sabonis' status as a second-generation NBA player is also explored in the series. Tatum's parents and his son Deuce were featured in his moments in the series, with his storyline following the Celtics' route to winning the 2024 NBA Finals.

=== Season 2 ===
The second season stars Jaylen Brown of the Boston Celtics, Kevin Durant of the Phoenix Suns, Shai Gilgeous-Alexander of the Oklahoma City Thunder, Tyrese Haliburton of the Indiana Pacers, and James Harden of the Los Angeles Clippers.

== Development and release ==
The series is produced by Uninterrupted, a media production company under the SpringHill Company umbrella and founded by James and Maverick Carter. Omaha Productions and Higher Ground Productions also helped produce Starting 5. Executive producers for the series include Carter, Jamal Henderson, Philip Byron, and Randy Mims (through Uninterrupted); Barack and Michelle Obama, Vinnie Malhotra, and Ethan Lewis (through Higher Ground); and Peyton Manning, Jamie Horowitz, and Sam Pepper (through Omaha). The series was developed for Netflix, which has worked with Uninterrupted and Omaha before on similar sports documentary series such as The Redeem Team and Quarterback. Though Higher Ground worked with Netflix before, Starting 5 marked the company's first sports-related programming to stream on the service. Susan Ansman, Trishtan Williams, and Peter J. Scalettar serve as directors on the series, with the latter also being the series' showrunner.

The three production companies involved provided their own unique assets to the series' development; Uninterrupted/SpringHill "brought its ongoing experience with athlete-driven productions", while Higher Ground were involved with the series' storytelling and "emotionally driven" aspects, and through Quarterback and Receiver, Omaha provided proofs of concept for the network, NBA league brass, and the players in the series. Quarterback was "particularly influential" in the development of Starting 5, with Ansman citing the "depth and length of access granted to Quarterback" by high-profile players like Patrick Mahomes as opening the door for similarly-styled series. Scalettar explained to Variety that the Starting 5 crew "shot episodes with the intention of breaking through the media trained facade possessed by players to find underlying emotional subtext". Featuring Sabonis' wife Shashana Rosen and "focusing on family dynamics", for example, "allowed the creatives to discover threads of vulnerability".

The first season of the series was released on Netflix on October 9, 2024. On October 30, a second season was announced. Lauri Markkanen of the Utah Jazz declined to be a subject, citing a wish to keep his private life private and to not disrupt the locker room. It was released on October 16, 2025.

== Episodes ==
Season	Episodes	Originally released
1	10	October 9, 2024
2	8	October 16, 2025

=== Season 1 (2024) ===
No. overall	No. in season	Title	Original release date
1	1	"Meet the Hoopers Part I"	October 9, 2024
2	2	"Meet the Hoopers Part II"	October 9, 2024
3	3	"Survival of the Fittest"	October 9, 2024
4	4	"Father Christmas"	October 9, 2024
5	5	"The Struggle Is Real"	October 9, 2024
6	6	"All Star, Baby"	October 9, 2024
7	7	"Push"	October 9, 2024
8	8	"I'm Here!"	October 9, 2024
9	9	"Passing the Torch"	October 9, 2024
10	10	"Just Be Yourself"	October 9, 2024

=== Season 2 (2025) ===
No. overall	No. in season	Title	Original release date
11	1	"Play to Win"	October 16, 2025
12	2	"Love & Basketball"	October 16, 2025
13	3	"Time Keeps On Slippin'"	October 16, 2025
14	4	"Mama's Boys"	October 16, 2025
15	5	"Ring Chasing"	October 16, 2025
16	6	"Changing of the Guards"	October 16, 2025
17	7	"What the Hali"	October 16, 2025
18	8	"Collision Course"	October 16, 2025

== Reception ==
The first season of Starting 5 received lukewarm critical reception. One positive review came from Katie Baker of The Ringer, who wrote "the moments that take place in cramped arena hallways or sprawling kitchens or, in one case, a labor and delivery ward (!) are what really light up the show—and distinguish it from so many other projects in the increasingly crowded sports documentary space." Baker also wrote positively of the creators and five subjects' willingness to participate in the series' film-making during the first season, writing that they "don't merely understand the assignment—they actually seem to enjoy doing the hard work required of it". Edwards' youthful exuberance was praised by Baker and Jason Jones of The Athletic. Jones, however, was more critical of the series, particularly its depiction of on-court drama. He complimented the series for its coverage of the players' family dynamics but lamented that "the basketball insights in the documentary aren't bad; they just aren't groundbreaking."

Alison Herman of Variety was much more critical of the series, however. Herman wrote that there is a trade-off inherent with series like Starting 5, elaborating that "On the one hand, the comfort of editorial control allows for access into the players' private lives. On the other, that very control all but guarantees the access won't amount to true perspective or vulnerability. Starting 5 delivers on that guarantee with an unremarkable survey of truly remarkable people. The thrill of meeting the players' families and seeing their homes quickly dissipates in light of trite, safe insights into the existence of the NBA's elite. They love their wives, children and parents. They care deeply about winning. They have quirks and eccentricities, but only endearing ones". Herman bemoaned that the players' social media feeds could offer more to viewers than the series. She added that the season "conspicuously lacks such an overarching story", but did positively note that "the players themselves are left to keep us entertained, a weight they are thankfully capable of shouldering".

== See also ==
- List of basketball films
