= Darril Fosty =

Canadian journalist (born 1968)

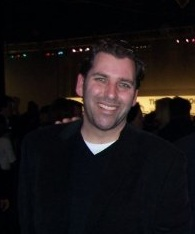
- Fosty at the 2008 NHL All-Star Game
- Born: Darril Wayne Fosty; December 21, 1968 (age 57); Terrace, British Columbia, Canada
- Occupation: Writer
- Writing career
- Years active: 2003–present

Darril Wayne Fosty (December 21, 1968) is a Canadian-American journalist, author, and documentarian.

== Early life ==
Born in Terrace, British Columbia on December 21, 1968, Fosty's family moved to Kamloops, where he started grade one. After high school, Fosty moved to Bellingham, Washington, where he attended Western Washington University, majoring in history and journalism and graduating in 1992.

== Career ==
In 1994, Fosty wrote press releases for the Seattle Sounders FC sports information department. After leaving the Sounders, he worked for the Internet security start-up Zendit, later called Authora. In 2003, Fosty released his first book with his brother George, Splendid is the Sun: The 5,000 Year History of Hockey.

In 2004, he and his brother released the book Black Ice: The Lost History of the Colored Hockey League, 1895-1925 which was featured in a short documentary on ESPN and featured on Oprah.com's "Books That Made A Difference". The book is credited with the revival of the history of the Colored Hockey League of the Maritimes.

A documentary short written, produced, and directed by Fosty in conjunction with the National Hockey League Diversity Program called Black Ice was the winner of Best Documentary Short at the 2008 Roxbury Film Festival in Boston.

The Fosty brothers received recognition from the Shaka Franklin Foundation of Denver, Colorado, for the creation of "The Black Ice Project" and their ongoing efforts to preserve Black history in 2008, teaching awards from George Washington University for the book Black Ice in 2011, and the John G. Dennison Award in 2020 from Black History Ottawa.

In 2013, the Fosty brothers' book Where Brave Men Fall: The Battle of Dieppe and the Espionage War Against Hitler, 1939-1942 looked at how American and British news organizations, including Time and Life magazines, leaked information about the Dieppe Raid to the German side, resulting in the deaths, wounding, and capture of over 4,300 American, British, and Canadian soldiers.

In 2022, LeBron James, Drake, and Maverick Carter produced Hubert Davis' documentary film Black Ice based on the Fosty brothers' book. The film won the People's Choice Documentary Award at the Toronto International Film Festival.

In 2022, Fosty released the book Nais-Myth: Basketball's Stolen Legacy, which credits the invention of basketball to a 16-year-old volunteer director at the Herkimer, New York, YMCA named Lambert Will who invented the game in 1891 only to have his idea taken and credited to James Naismith. The book resulted in the New York State Legislature passing a resolution recognizing Lambert Will, and not James Naismith, as the inventor of basketball and the Village of Herkimer, New York as the birthplace of basketball.

== Personal life ==
Fosty lives in New York City. He is the co-founder of the Society of North American Sports Historians and Researchers and of CardBiz.ca.

=== Non-fiction ===
- Splendid Is The Sun: The 5,000 Year History of Hockey (2003).
- Black Ice: The Lost History of the Colored Hockey League of the Maritimes (2004).
- Footie's Black Book: A Guide To International Association Football (World Cup Soccer 2010 Edition) (2010).
- Where Brave Men Fall: The Battle of Dieppe And The Allied Espionage War Against Hitler, 1939–1942 (2013).
- Tribes: An International Hockey History (2014).
- Creating Excellence: Inside the World of Stryker-Indigo (2014).
- Nais-Myth: Basketball's Stolen Legacy (2022).
- Coiled Dragon: From Soccer to AI, China's Upcoming War with America (2024).
- Collectors Guide To O-Pee-Chee Hockey Cards, 1933-1995 (2024).
- Black Ice: The Lost History of the Colored Hockey League of the Maritimes (20th Anniversary Edition) (2025).
- O-Pee-Chee & Topps Hockey Card Collectors Guide 1933-1995 (2026)

=== Fiction ===
- Apocalypse 2012 Cookbook: An End of the World Cooking and Survival Guide for the Man, Woman and Family On the Run (2011).
- Apocalypse Cookbook (2026).
