= Mind the Game =

Sports podcast

- Logo used for season 1
- Genre: Sports
- Format: Audio; video
- Language: English

Creative team
- Created by: LeBron James; JJ Redick
- Directed by: Jason Gallagher

Cast and voices
- Hosted by: LeBron James (seasons 1–3); JJ Redick (season 1); Steve Nash (seasons 2-3)

Production
- Production: Uninterrupted; ThreeFourTwo Productions; Wondery

Publication
- No. of episodes: 49
- Original release: March 19, 2024
- Updates: Weekly

Related

YouTube information
- Channel: Mind the Game
- Years active: 2024–present
- Genre: Sports podcast
- Subscribers: 899 thousand
- Views: 105.8 million
- Last updated: June 28, 2026

Mind the Game is a basketball podcast created by the American basketball players LeBron James and JJ Redick. At the time of the podcast's debut on March 19, 2024, James was an active player for the Los Angeles Lakers of the National Basketball Association (NBA), while Redick was a retired NBA player, serving as an NBA broadcast analyst for ESPN and sports podcaster. The first season was produced by James' and Redick's respective media production companies, Uninterrupted and ThreeFourTwo Productions, and distributed on YouTube.

On June 24, just a few months after the podcast's debut, Redick was introduced as the head coach of the Lakers and stated he would not continue podcasting in the role. In March 2025, Mind the Game was announced to return with James now joined by Canadian former NBA player and coach Steve Nash. Uninterrupted and Wondery co-produced the second season of the series. With the latter being an Amazon Music subsidiary, the podcast began to be additionally distributed on Amazon Prime Video. Critically, the series has received praise for the on-air chemistry and analysis of its hosts, though some writers and sports personalities have criticized the podcast's tone.

== Content ==
A sports podcast, Mind the Game is hosted by NBA player LeBron James. Retired fellow NBA players JJ Redick and Steve Nash filled the role of James' co-host in the first and second seasons, respectively. The hosts discuss and analyze the game of basketball, primarily in an "X's and O's" fashion.

James Caspian Kang of The New Yorker described that in the video form of podcast, James and Redick are "shot in an intimate style with a lot of wine bottles littered around the set". Episodes feature Redick explaining basketball jargon so that the audience can later follow along when he and James "meticulously" analyze particular plays, which included some of James' from throughout his career. Redick's explanations are delivered in solo monologues. In the video version of the podcast, his explanations are accompanied by on-screen definitions and he is featured drawing up the actions he describes.

The structure of the show remained largely the same with Nash as a co-host; he and James held similar detailed discussions on the podcast regarding game preparation, basketball strategy, post-game recovery, and related topics. The second season also expanded its scope to include interviews with other active NBA players; James' teammate Luka Dončić and peer Kevin Durant were featured during the season.

== Episodes ==
=== Series overview ===
Season	Episodes	Originally released	
Season	Episodes	First released	Last released
1	9	March 19, 2024	June 5, 2024
2	17	April 1, 2025	July 15, 2025
3	23	October 8, 2025	Ongoing

=== Season 1 (2024) ===
No. overall	No. in season	Title	Original release date	Viewers (millions)
1	1	"What Makes a Great Basketball Player?"	March 19, 2024	4.48
2	2	"The Hardest Actions to Guard in Basketball"	March 27, 2024	2.49
3	3	"Basketball Evolution"	April 3, 2024	1.79
4	4	"The Spacing, The Icons and The Block"	April 10, 2024	1.18
5	5	"The NBA Playoffs"	April 17, 2024	1.30
6	6	"How Three-Point Shooting Changed Everything"	May 1, 2024	0.88
7	7	"Breaking Down the 2024 NBA Playoffs (So Far)"	May 8, 2024	0.90
8	8	"The Conference Finals"	May 22, 2024	1.02
9	9	"The NBA Finals"	June 5, 2024	0.98

=== Season 2 (2025) ===
No. overall	No. in season	Title	Original release date	Viewers (millions) (Note: as of July 7, 2025)
10	1	"Luka Dončić, Longevity, and Love of the Game"	April 1, 2025	1.86
11	2	"LeBron's Routine in Detail"	April 8, 2025	1.26
12	3	"How Steve Nash's Suns Revolutionized Today's NBA"	April 15, 2025	0.57
13	4	"NBA Playoffs Are a Different Game"	April 22, 2025	1.11
14	5	"Wolves vs. Lakers and the Evolution of Anthony Edwards"	May 8, 2025	1.06
15	6	"Why the Mid-Range Matters So Much in the Playoffs"	May 13, 2025	0.66
16	7	"Brunson, Jokić and The Evolution of the NBA Playmaker"	May 20, 2025	0.40
17	8	"Playoff Trends: Physicality, Crazy Comebacks, and More"	May 27, 2025	0.31
18	9	"The Luka Dončić Interview (Part 1)"	June 1, 2025	2.39
19	10	"Thunder vs. Pacers is the Perfect NBA Finals"	June 4, 2025	0.72
20	11	"The Luka Dončić Interview (Part 2)"	June 8, 2025	1.28
21	12	"The 2025 NBA Finals Are For the REAL Basketball Fan"	June 11, 2025	0.18
22	13	"LeBron James & Steve Nash Answer Fans Burning Questions"	June 17, 2025	0.30
23	14	"LeBron on Cooper Flagg and Going #1 in the NBA Draft"	June 24, 2025	0.35
24	15	"The Kevin Durant Interview (Part 1)"	July 1, 2025	2.96

== Production ==
=== Background and development ===
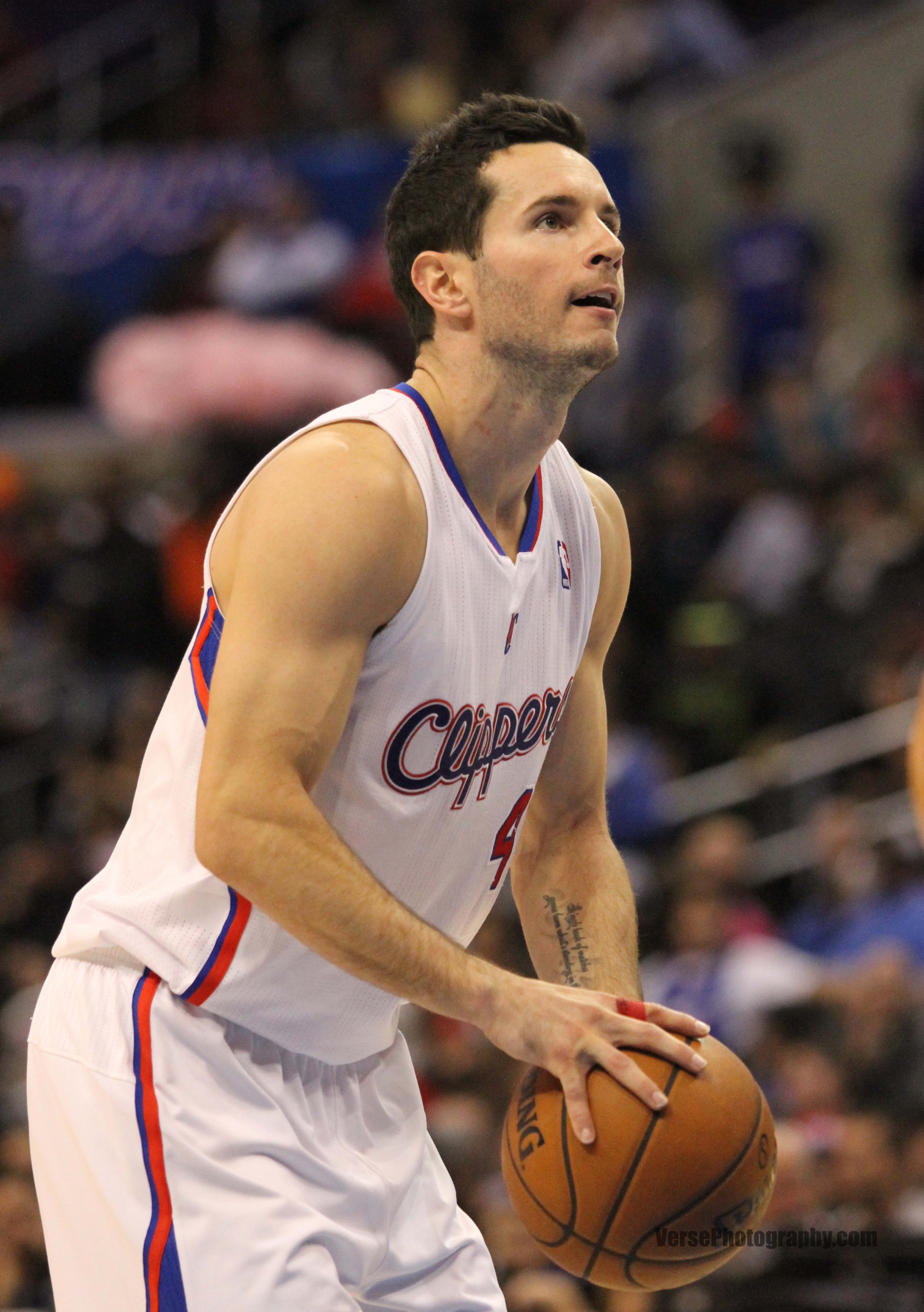
JJ Redick (pictured in 2013) had a considerable amount of podcasting experience prior to co-hosting season 1 of Mind the Game.

Prior to Mind the Game, Redick had been in the podcasting space for years. He was first approached in the summer of 2015 to join NBA reporter Adrian Wojnarowski's then new website, The Vertical, as a writer. Still an active player at the time, Redick declined, thinking he would not able to balance writing with his playing workload. That October, Wojnarowski pitched the idea of Redick hosting a podcast instead. In February 2016, Redick became the first active NBA player to host a weekly show when he launched his podcast with The Vertical, part of Yahoo! Sports' network. Redick hosted 40 episodes of his podcast for Yahoo! Sports, as well as a singular one produced by Uninterrupted, a production company founded by James. Redick further worked with Uninterrupted as the subject of The Process, a short documentary film produced by the company in 2017. Redick also met media producer Tommy Alter, who suggested the former host a podcast for The Ringer. Alter's production credits include The Shop, a talk show-formatted web series starring James. Redick went on to host for three seasons, the final of which was co-hosted by Alter. In 2020, following his stint with The Ringer, Redick co-founded ThreeFourTwo Productions along with Alter and the two began hosting The Old Man and the Three podcast.

While Redick was an experienced podcaster when Mind the Game premiered, the series marked James's first venture in the medium. Bleacher Report reported that ESPN analyst and former NBA player Jay Williams stated that Mind the Game "was broadly in the work for years as an idea and predated [Darvin] Ham's tenure" as head coach of the Lakers (which began in 2022). The podcast was produced by James's and Redick's respective media companies. Jason Gallagher, who directed Redick's previous podcasting ventures, continued to work with Redick, directing Mind the Game.

=== Release ===
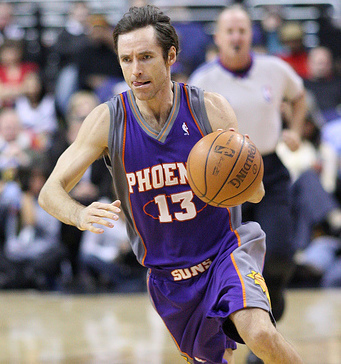
Steve Nash (pictured in 2007) replaced JJ Redick as LeBron James' co-host in season 2.

Mind the Game premiered on digital streaming platforms on March 19, 2024, with its video format being released on an eponymous YouTube channel.

In June 2024, Redick signed on to be the head coach of James' Lakers. During his introductory press conference on June 24, Redick stated that he was "done with podcasting", including his appearances on Mind the Game. At the time, the podcast released nine episodes. On the future status of Mind the Game, Sports Illustrated writer Eva Geitheim stated "it's unclear if James will continue the podcast on his own, bring on a new co-host, or end the podcast altogether". Meanwhile, ESPN writer Dave McMenamin referred to the podcast as "shuttered". Redick did however add during his introductory press conference that there would be closure of sorts for Mind the Game, stating "we'll just do something for all of the people that listened and we'll have a small little video".

On March 26, 2025, a second season was announced, with former NBA player Steve Nash joining James as the new co-host, replacing Redick. Produced by Uninterrupted and Wondery, the second season premiered on April 1 and was released on YouTube and Amazon Prime.

In 2026, Indiana Pacers point guard Tyrese Haliburton joined James to guest host an episode of the podcast. Actor Timothée Chalamet appeared on a live recording of the podcast, as part of a promotional tour for his film Marty Supreme.

== Reception ==
=== Critical response ===
After the first episode of Mind the Game was uploaded, Jimmy Traina of Sports Illustrated called the podcast "a must listen". Traina wrote that Redick already proved himself a "tremendous podcaster" in the space. He added that James's foray into podcasting was successful, calling him "a natural" and praising his mixture of "X's and O's with fun and lightheartedness".

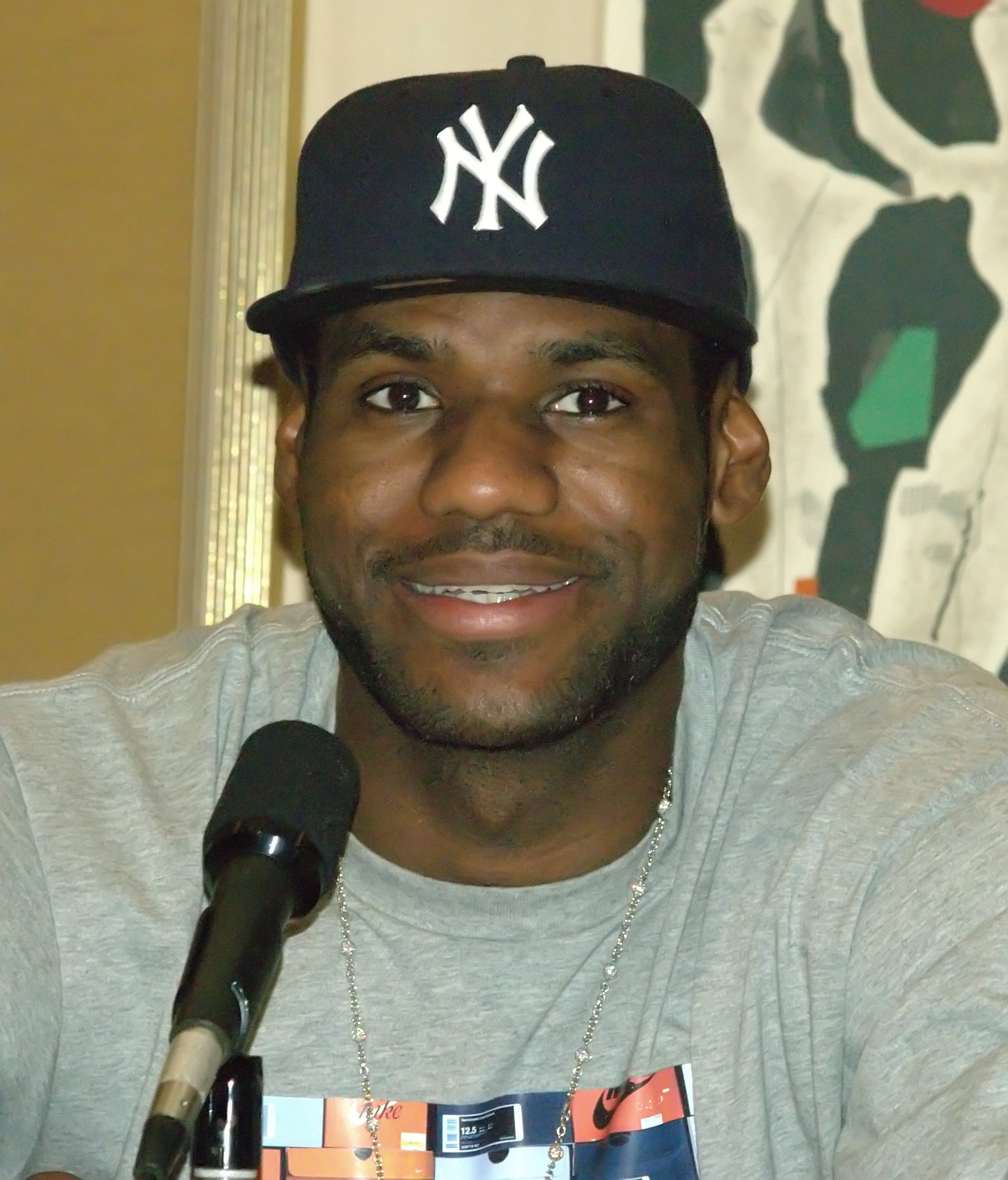
LeBron James (pictured in 2009) has received both critical praise for his podcasting and criticism for his decision to launch Mind the Game.

Writing on the series after its first five episodes premiered, Kang wrote that "The show's gambit is to bring star power and the perspective of real insiders to analytical commentary, renegotiating the sportswriter's balance between geeky shoptalk and the audience's love of narratives". Marcus Thompson II of The New York Times wrote positively of James' and Redick's work on the podcast, opining that although "it drips with pretension at times" and "occasionally delves into condescending tones", audiences should "be patient" with the show as the hosts "eventually descend to proletarian realms". Thompson II added that "Most of the episodes are actually spent right where you want them: talking ball, breaking down plays and players, rehashing memories. You don't even notice the swirls and sips because it's too captivating when [James] slides into his zone of explanation". Thompson praised the chemistry between James and Redick, calling the latter a "worthy floor general" for the show and writing that:

Vulnerability, clearly, is to be coaxed out of [James]. The show could certainly use more of it. But Redick squeezes out enough to avoid predictability. It's [James'] analysis of it all, the triumphs and the struggles, that offers the show's greatest gems and makes it a compelling digestion.

Stephen A. Smith, the host of ESPN's First Take talk show stated that "numerous coaches, Black coaches, called me expressing how they took issue with that podcast taking place". Smith also opined that James' decision to launch the podcast in the middle of the 2023–24 NBA season while the Lakers' then head coach Darvin Ham was on the "hot seat" was an "egregious thing". Smith added that many of the coaches who contacted him felt that it "hurt" Ham's standing as the Lakers' coach. Ham was fired from his position following the Lakers' elimination from the 2024 NBA playoffs and Redick emerged as a widely reported candidate for the vacancy; ESPN analyst and reporter Andraya Carter stated that Mind the Game reflected Redick's ambitions to be an NBA coach. ESPN sportswriter Brian Windhorst was also critical of the podcast, though about its content, opining that NBA fans want to view shows covering the league's drama and would not want to engage with basketball media that is centered around "X's and O's".

=== Viewership ===
The first episode of Mind the Game received over 1.3 million views on YouTube in its first day, attracting 227,000 subscribers in the same period. By the time Redick was hired as the Lakers' coach, the episode received nearly 4 million views. Each of the nine episodes received over 700,000 views at the time of Redick's hiring. When the second season was announced, the podcast's YouTube channel amassed over 500,000 subscribers and the first season's episodes received an average of 1.5 million views.
