= Uninterrupted =

American sports media company

- Type: Private
- Industry: Entertainment; Sports; Apparel
- Founded: 2014; 12 years ago
- Founder: LeBron James; Maverick Carter
- Parent: SpringHill Company
- Website: uninterrupted.com

Uninterrupted (stylized in all caps) is an American multi-platform media company founded by LeBron James and Maverick Carter. Its primary focus is on sports media, with an intended aim to highlight athletes' voices in the sports media space.

Initially started in 2014 as a series of video testimonials by professional athletes, including James, Uninterrupted has since expanded to produce film and television series, sell e-commerce and apparel goods, and host a film festival. In 2019, the company launched a Canadian-centered branch and the following year, Uninterrupted was merged to form SpringHill Company, which would later merge with Fulwell 73 in 2025.

== Founding and early projects (2015–2017) ==
Founded by LeBron James and Maverick Carter, Uninterrupted first formed in December 2014, as a series of testimonials by various professional athletes. James and Carter are childhood friends and long-time business partners, and initially self-financed the venture. James, an American professional basketball player who was then a member of the National Basketball Association (NBA)'s Cleveland Cavaliers gave testimonials of his professional career. He was joined by other players such as Rob Gronkowski, a tight end for the New England Patriots; Draymond Green, a small forward on the Golden State Warriors; and Ronda Rousey, a fighter in the UFC. The series was produced by SpringHill Entertainment, a media company founded by James and Carter, and run by the latter. The testimonials were first hosted on Bleacher Report, a website owned by Turner Sports. The Facebook 360 and Oculus VR platforms later hosted Uninterrupted content, as did go90.

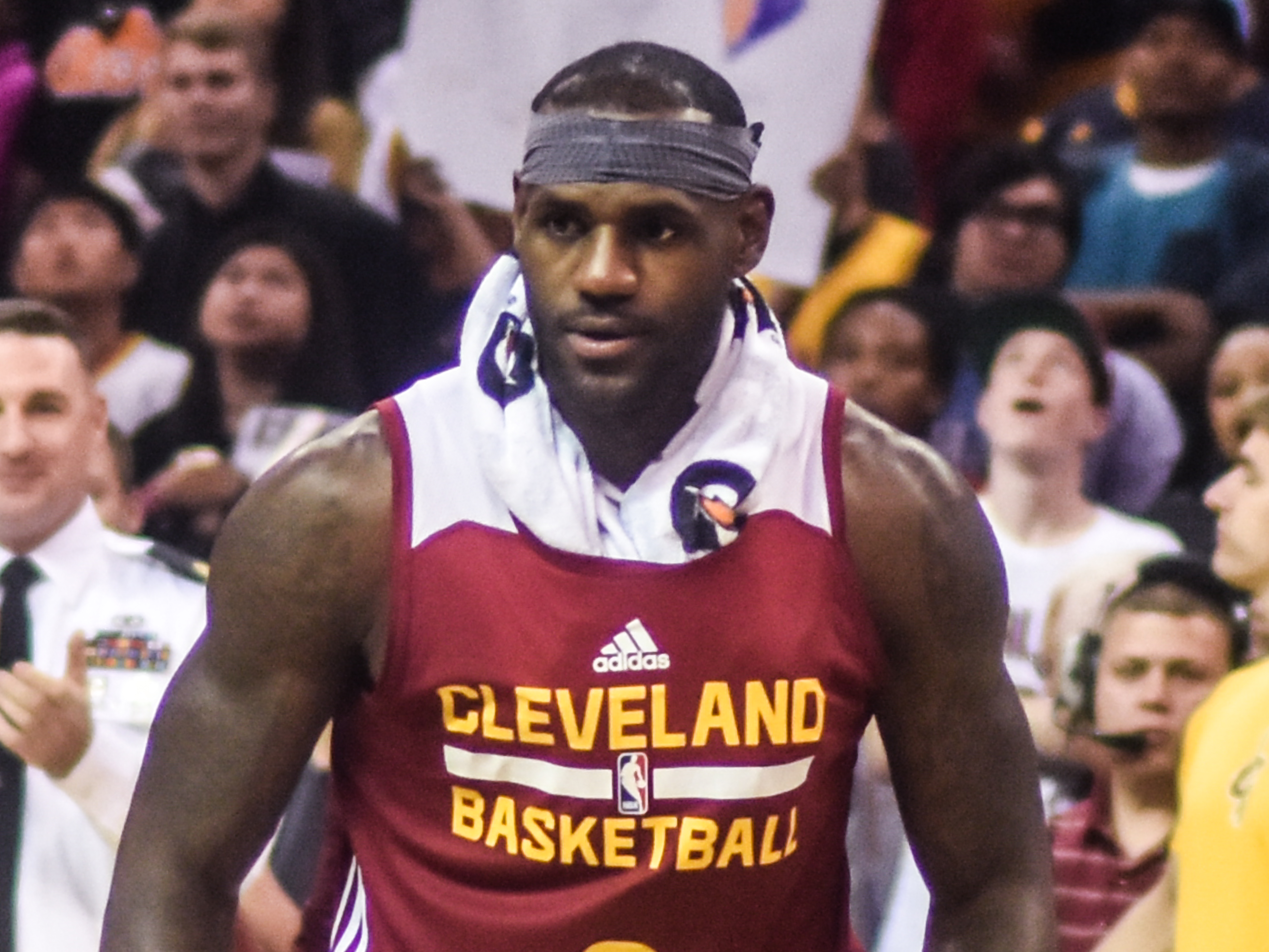
LeBron James in 2015

In May 2015, Uninterrupted registered its YouTube channel, where it hosts content as well. In September, Striving for Greatness, a documentary series featuring James' training regimen was filmed by Uninterrupted. He later began posting links to episodes of the series on social media later that autumn. In December, Uninterrupted received a $15.8 million investment from Warner Bros. and Turner Sports, with the latter becoming the company's primary sales arm.

By 2017, the company described itself as a "distributed media platform", as well as "an all-digital sports programming network". That year, Uninterrupted produced the documentary series Flashback featuring Dwyane Wade, Rebuilt starring Chris Bosh, as well as Draft Diaries. Uninterrupted also produced the feature-length documentary Fight Mom and began its own podcasting network. Carter hosted Kneading Dough, which was released as a video series and podcast. Carter also hosted Branching Out with both podcast series sponsored by Chase Bank. Additionally, Green hosted his own podcast on the network, dubbed Dray Day.

== Launching The Shop, Canadian operation, and e-commerce and apparel (2017–2019) ==
Uninterrupted began its development of The Shop in 2017, as well, with the project being "a 30-minute panel talk show set in a barbershop". The series featured James and his guests getting their hair cut. ESPN aired clips of the episode in its programming around NBA Finals games, while the first episode in its entirety was aired on Uninterrupted's website and ESPN's YouTube channel, garnering around 4 million views. The Shop's pilot starred James and Green; James' Cavaliers and Green's Warriors coincidentally matched up against each other during that year's Finals. The first episode also featured Carter, former NBA player Charles Oakley, and rapper 2 Chainz.

Later in the year, Uninterrupted produced More Than An Athlete, an eight-episode documentary series about James' basketball career, with James, Carter, and their childhood friends Rich Paul and Randy Mims appearing in the series and serving as executive producers. The series premiered on ESPN+ on November 20, 2018, with episodes airing weekly through January 2019. In 2019, Uninterrupted partnered with the over-the-top streaming platform DAZN to produce 40 Days, a boxing documentary series. Aired on April 23 and 30, the first two episodes featured Canelo Álvarez and Daniel Jacobs as they prepared for their middleweight title fight in May 2019.

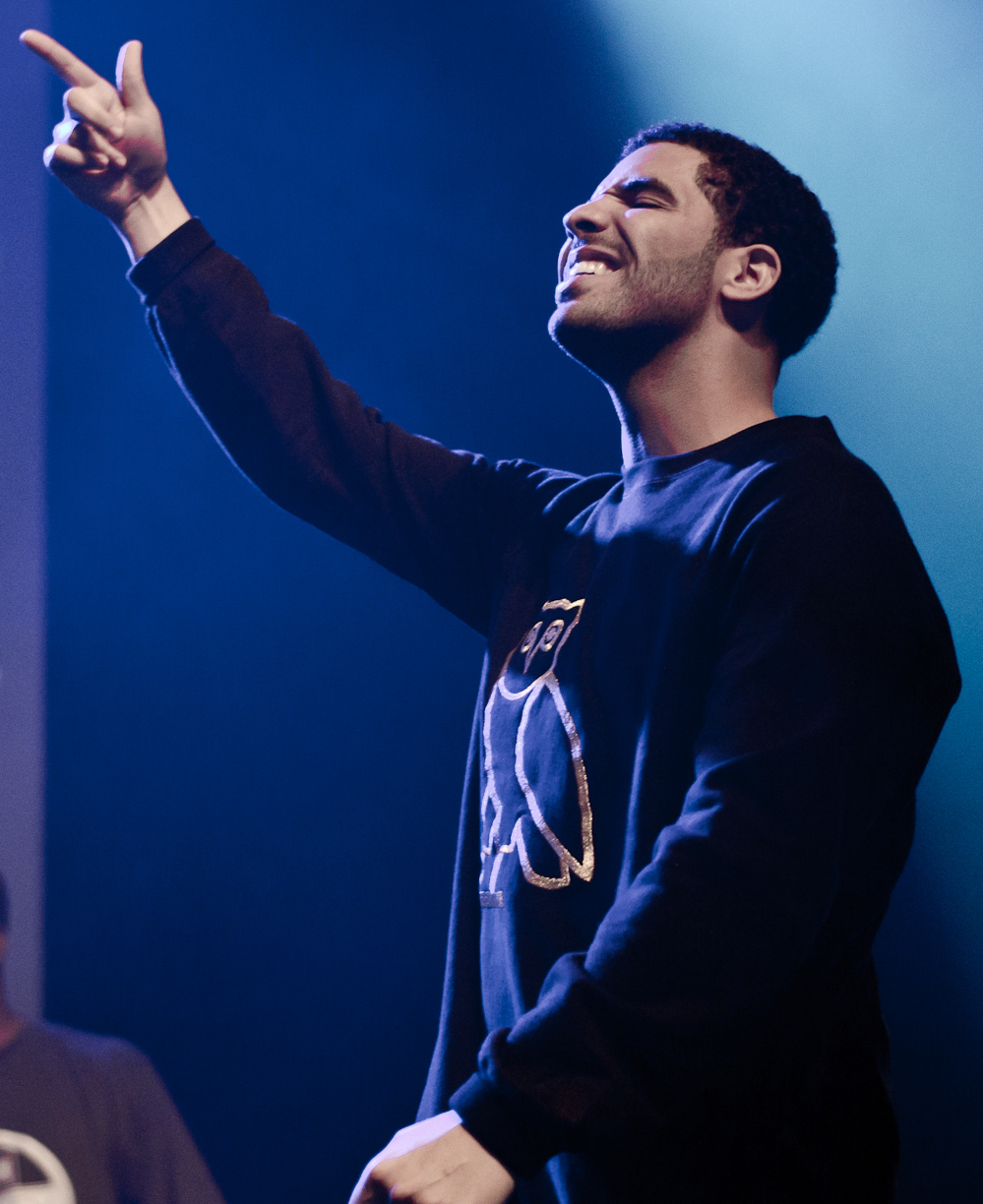
Canadian musician Drake (pictured in 2011) partnered with the company to launch Uninterrupted Canada in 2019

The company partnered with Canadian musician Drake to form Uninterrupted Canada, with the Canadian platform officially launching on August 2. The partnership deal saw Drake become a part owner and promoter of Uninterrutped Canada. Scott Moore was brought on as the CEO of the Canadian operation. Toronto Raptors player Serge Ibaka was one of Uninterrupted Canada's first athletes to be brought on board for content production; the company also produced Height Doesn't Measure Heart, a series with Toronto Blue Jays pitcher Marcus Stroman. Uninterrupted Canada also produced the interview show Who's Interviewing Who?.

Outside of Canada, Uninterrupted also partnered with David Beckham's Studio 99 to produce a documentary series around Inter Miami CF. In October, Uninterrupted launched its own e-commerce merchandise and apparel. The collection was a collaboration with Nike, featuring the company's branding as well as Uninterrupted's "I am more than an athlete" phrase. Nike released two Uninterrupted-branded sneakers (one LeBron 17 and one Air Force 1) as part of the collaboration. Uninterrupted's fashion line was expanded in December, with the launch of a private label.

Also in October, Uninterrupted announced it would be co-producing a documentary series about the Memphis Tigers' 2019–20 men's basketball season, following Memphis coach Penny Hardaway, assistant coach Mike Miller, and the team's number-one recruit James Wiseman.

== Merger into SpringHill, film festival, and further projects (2020–present) ==
In 2020, SpringHill Entertainment and Uninterrupted were merged, along with LeBron's other studio, The Robot Company, to form SpringHill Company. In April 2021, Uninterrupted partnered with Peacock to produce a documentary series about the 2020 Summer Olympics. In October 2021, SpringHill Company sold a minority stake to Nike, Epic Games, RedBird Capital Partners and Fenway Sports Group that would value the company at $725 million.

Beginning with its fifth season premiere in March 2022, The Shop began to air exclusively on Uninterrupted's YouTube channel, with Grey Goose becoming the show's presenting sponsor. In July, a Shop spin-off was launched: titled The Shop: Lineup, it focused on one guest and more prominently featured Grey Goose's vodka products.

Uninterrupted and Nike again collaborated on a shoe release, a Nike LeBron 20 variant, in April 2023. The shoe prominently included the brand's lapis lazuli color.

In June, Uninterrupted announced it would help produce a sequel to The Game Changers. The company also collaborated with Tribeca Enterprises and co-hosted a film festival on July 13 at NeueHouse Hollywood. The festival focused on athletes and their storytelling, with two new works showcased at the festival centering on Black athletes and their experiences. One of these productions, Goliath, is a documentary series about Wilt Chamberlain and produced by Showtime. Black Ice, a documentary film about racism in ice hockey was also screened at the festival, with James and Carter serving as executive producers. The film festival returned the following year, with James serving on the festival's short film selection committee with Naomi Osaka and Joel Embiid.

Uninterrupted embarked on a live tour of The Shop in the fall of 2023, visiting several historically black colleges and universities (HBCUs) including Tennessee State University, Hampton University, and North Carolina A&T University.

In March 2024, The Shop became its own consumer brand, splitting from Uninterrupted. That month, the James-hosted Mind the Game podcast first aired, with Uninterrupted producing. Later in the year, Uninterrupted-produced basketball series were released. Vice TV premiered Uninterrupted: The Real Stories of Basketball, a documentary series featuring various Hall of Fame players on June 4. Another series, Starting 5, which followed James and four other NBA players throughout the 2023–24 NBA season was released on Netflix on October 9.

== Copyright and trademark issues ==
On March 26, 2018, the University of Alabama's Crimson Tide football team released a teaser trailer for Shop Talk, which similar to The Shop, was centered around unfiltered conversation in a barbershop setting. The first episode of Shop Talk featured former Crimson Tide player Julio Jones alongside the Nick Saban, the team's coach. Uninterrupted's head of business and legal affairs issued a letter to the University of Alabama, highlighting copyright concerns and requesting the institution to send the entire first episode of Shop Talk for review "to then have a conversation about how to address Uninterrupted's concerns amicably". Shop Talk was later renamed as Bama Cuts.

A lawsuit filed in February 2020, by the Maryland-based nonprofit organization Game Plan, alleged that Uninterrupted (as well as Nike, ESPN, and Take-Two Interactive) infringed on the phrase "I am more than an athlete", trademarked by Game Plan. Attorneys for Uninterrupted responded stating, "the complaint filed by Game Plan today is meritless and contains numerous factual inaccuracies. Uninterrupted owns prior rights in and to the More Than An Athlete trademark". In December 2023, the Trademark Trial and Appeal Board ruled that Game Plan "never proved it was the rightful owner" of the "more than an athlete" phrase, effectively having Uninterrupted win the trademark rights to it.
