= Joel Embiid =

Cameroonian-American basketball player (born 1994)

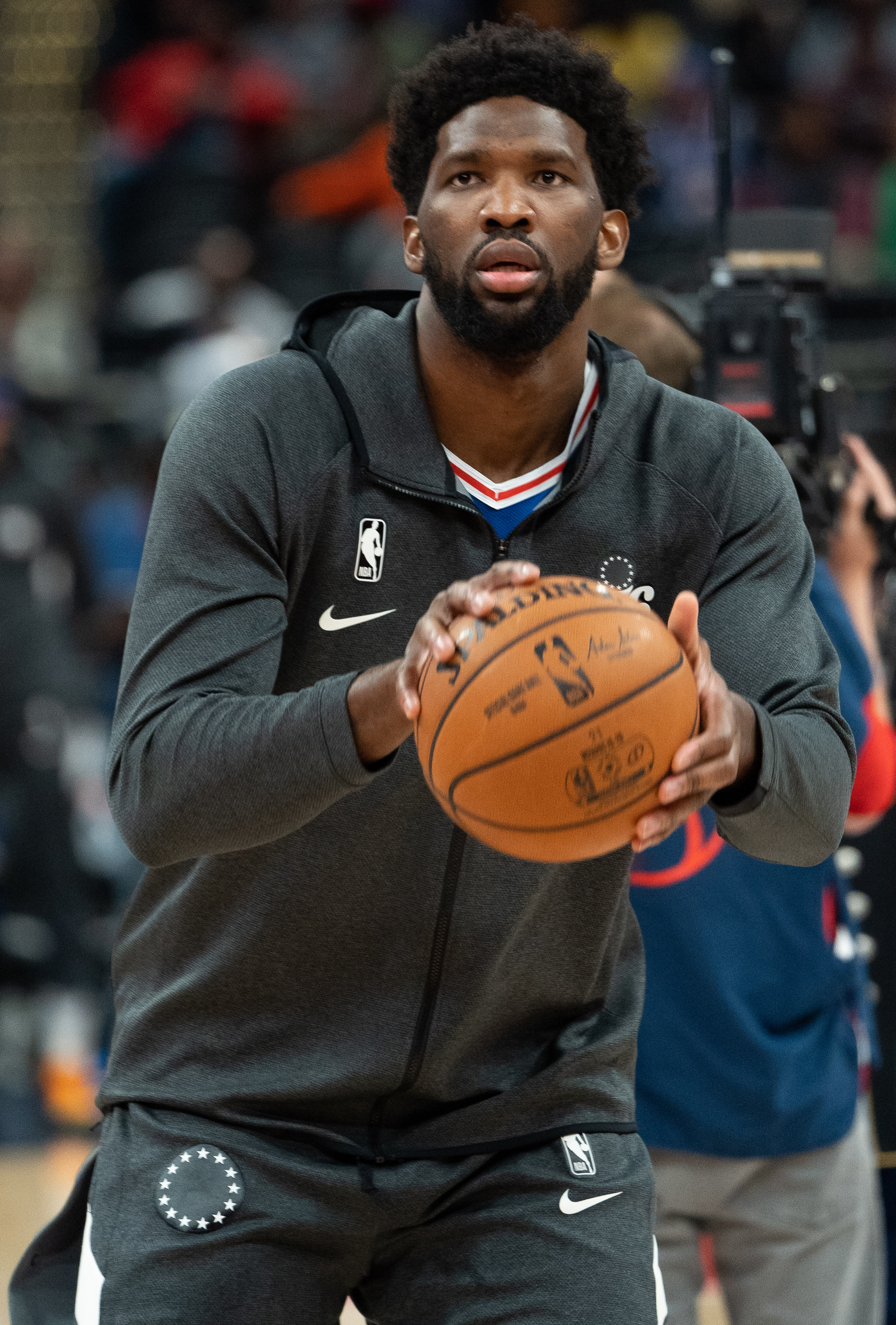
- Embiid with the Philadelphia 76ers in 2019

No. 21 – Philadelphia 76ers
- Position: Center
- League: NBA

Personal information
- Born: 16 March 1994 (age 32) Yaoundé, Cameroon
- Listed height: 7 ft 0 in (2.13 m)
- Listed weight: 270 lb (122 kg)

Career information
- High school: Montverde Academy (Montverde, Florida); The Rock School (Gainesville, Florida)
- College: Kansas (2013–2014)
- NBA draft: 2014: 1st round, 3rd overall pick
- Drafted by: Philadelphia 76ers
- Playing career: 2014–present

Career history
- 2014–present: Philadelphia 76ers

Career highlights
- NBA Most Valuable Player (2023); 7× NBA All-Star (2018–2024); All-NBA First Team (2023); 4× All-NBA Second Team (2018, 2019, 2021, 2022); 3× NBA All-Defensive Second Team (2018, 2019, 2021); 2× NBA scoring champion (2022, 2023); NBA All-Rookie First Team (2017); Second-team All-Big 12 (2014); Big 12 Defensive Player of the Year (2014); Big 12 All-Defensive Team (2014); Big 12 All-Newcomer Team (2014)
- Stats at NBA.com
- Stats at Basketball Reference
Medals
Men's basketball
Representing the United States
Olympic Games
| Gold medal – first place | 2024 Paris | Team |

Joel Hans Embiid (/dʒoʊˈɛl ɛmˈbiːd/ joh-EL em-BEED; born 16 March 1994) is a Cameroonian American (Note: Embiid is a citizen of Cameroon, France and the United States. For this article, he is introduced as Cameroonian American.) professional basketball player for the Philadelphia 76ers of the National Basketball Association (NBA). After one year of college basketball with the Kansas Jayhawks, he was drafted third overall by the 76ers in the 2014 NBA draft. The 7-foot (2.13 m) center is a seven-time NBA All-Star, a five-time member of the All-NBA Team, a three-time member of the All-Defensive Team, and a two-time NBA scoring champion. He was named the NBA Most Valuable Player (MVP) in 2023. Embiid also won a gold medal on the 2024 U.S. Olympic team.

Multiple foot and knee injuries delayed Embiid's debut for two seasons until 2016–17 when he was named to the NBA All-Rookie First Team despite playing only 31 games. He nicknamed himself "the Process" to embrace the era in 76ers history in which he began his career. Embiid led the NBA in scoring during the 2021–22 and 2022–23 seasons, becoming the first center to do so since Shaquille O'Neal (2000), and was also the first center since Moses Malone (1982) to average over 30 points per game, while also being the first foreign player to lead the NBA in scoring.

== Early life ==
Embiid was born in Yaoundé, Cameroon, to military officer Thomas Embiid and his wife, Christine. He played volleyball and soccer in childhood and originally planned to play professional volleyball in Europe but started playing basketball at age 15, modeling his game after NBA Hall of Fame center Hakeem Olajuwon. Embiid was discovered at a basketball camp by Luc Mbah a Moute, a fellow native of Yaoundé and an NBA player. With Mbah a Moute as his mentor, Embiid moved to the United States at age 16 to devote himself to becoming a professional basketball player.

Embiid enrolled at Montverde Academy, Mbah a Moute's alma mater, but transferred after his first year due to a lack of playing time. He then attended The Rock School, a Christian academy, in Gainesville, Florida. As a senior, he led their team to a 33–4 record and state championship, averaging 13.0 points, 9.7 rebounds and 1.9 blocks per game.

Embiid was a five-star recruit according to Rivals.com and committed to Kansas in November 2012.

== College career ==
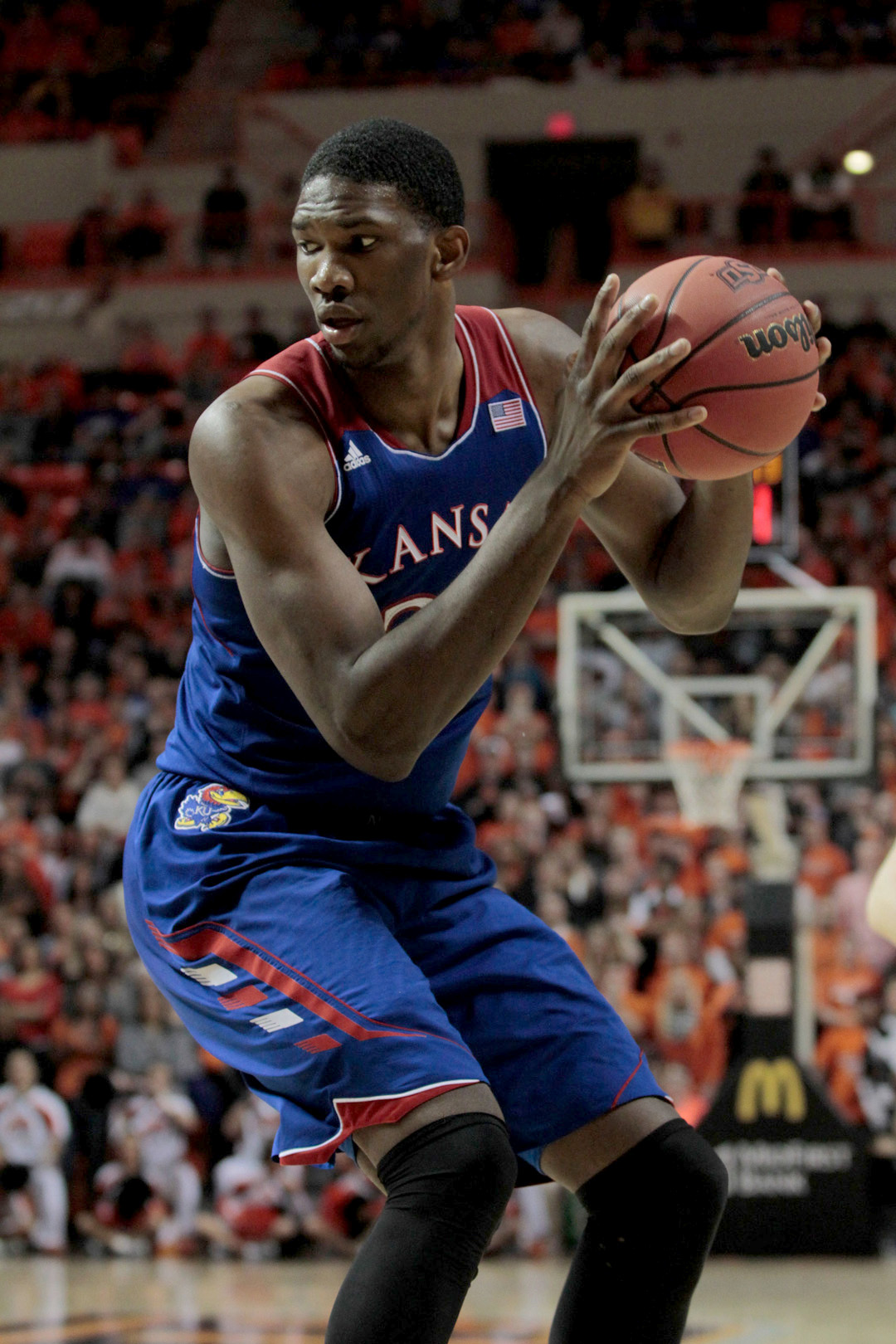
Embiid with the Kansas Jayhawks in 2014

Embiid attended the University of Kansas for one year alongside notable teammate Andrew Wiggins. On 13 February 2014, he was named one of the 30 finalists for the Naismith College Player of the Year. In 2013–14, he played 28 games, averaging 11.2 points, 8.1 rebounds, 1.4 assists and 2.6 blocks in 23.1 minutes per game. He had over 15 points in seven games and over 5 blocks in six games. He subsequently earned Big 12 Defensive Player of the Year honors and was named second-team All-Big 12.

Embiid suffered a stress fracture in his back in March 2014. He missed that year's Big 12 tournament and NCAA tournament. Kansas lost in the second round (round of 32) of the NCAA tournament.

== Professional career ==
=== 2014 NBA draft ===
On 9 April 2014, Embiid declared for the 2014 NBA draft, forgoing his final three years of college eligibility. On 20 June 2014, he underwent surgery on a broken navicular bone in his right foot, and was subsequently ruled out for four to six months. Six days later, he was selected with the third overall pick by the Philadelphia 76ers. That selection made him the third Cameroonian-born NBA player after Ruben Boumtje-Boumtje and Luc Mbah a Moute, as well as the highest selected player from Cameroon.

=== Philadelphia 76ers (2014–present) ===
==== Injury-plagued seasons (2014–2016) ====
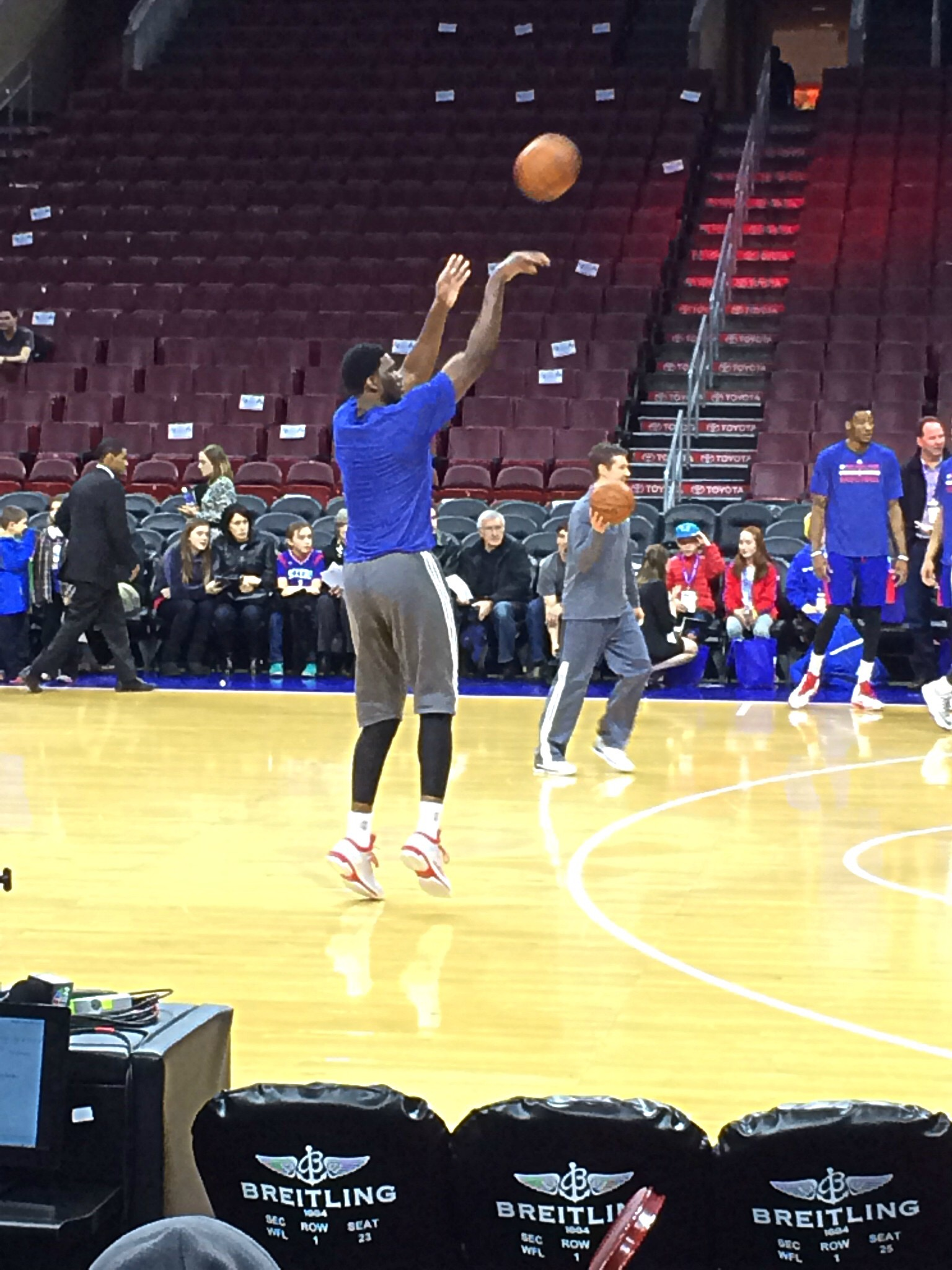
Embiid practicing with the 76ers in 2014

On 26 August 2014, Embiid signed his rookie scale contract with the 76ers. He was later ruled unlikely to play at all in the 2014–15 season due to the broken navicular bone in his foot. After missing the entire 2014–15 season, it was announced on 13 June 2015 that Embiid had suffered a setback in his recovery after a CT scan revealed less healing than anticipated. It was later determined that Embiid's chances of playing in the 2015–16 season were slim following a second round of surgery on his right foot on 18 August 2015. He missed the entire 2015–16 season.

==== 2016–17 season: All-Rookie honors ====
On 4 October 2016, Embiid started at center in the 76ers' first preseason game against the Boston Celtics. In his first action, he recorded six points, four rebounds and two blocks in 13 minutes en route to a 92–89 victory. On 26 October 2016, Embiid made his long-awaited NBA regular-season debut in the 76ers' season opener against the Oklahoma City Thunder. In 25 minutes as the starting center, he recorded 20 points, seven rebounds and two blocks in a 103–97 loss. On 1 November, he recorded his first career double-double with 18 points and 10 rebounds in a 103–101 loss to the Orlando Magic. On 11 November, his 25-point effort helped the 76ers claim their first win of the season, defeating the Indiana Pacers 109–105. On 19 November, he scored a then-career high 26 points in 20 minutes in a 120–105 win over the Phoenix Suns. On 1 December, he was named Eastern Conference Rookie of the Month for games played in October and November. On 18 December, he set a new career high with 33 points in a 108–107 win over the Brooklyn Nets. On 3 January 2017, he was named Eastern Conference Rookie of the Month for games played in December.

On 11 January 2017, Embiid grabbed a then-career high 14 rebounds in a 98–97 win over the New York Knicks. On 23 January, he was named Eastern Conference Player of the Week for games played Monday, 16 January through Sunday, 22 January. Two days later, he was named in the World Team for the 2017 Rising Stars Challenge. On 2 February 2017, he was named Eastern Conference Rookie of the Month for games played in January, while also being named a Taco Bell Skills Challenge participant. On 11 February 2017, it was revealed that Embiid had a torn meniscus in his left knee, but that surgery would not be required. As a result of the injury, Embiid was ruled out of the All-Star Weekend festivities. After initially ruling him out indefinitely on 27 February with swelling in his left knee, the 76ers issued a statement two days later announcing that Embiid would miss the rest of the 2016–17 season, an MRI on his left knee having revealed that the area affected by the bone bruise had improved significantly while the previously identified meniscus tear appeared more pronounced. On 24 March 2017, he underwent successful minor arthroscopic surgery to address the meniscus tear in his left knee. At the season's end, he was named to the NBA All-Rookie First Team.

==== 2017–18 season: First All-Star and All-NBA appearances ====
On 10 October 2017, Embiid signed a five-year, $148 million designated rookie scale maximum contract extension with the 76ers, with the ability to earn an additional $30 million if he earns an All-NBA first-, second- or third-team selection, or is named MVP in 2017–18. In the 76ers' season opener against the Washington Wizards on 18 October, Embiid scored 18 points and 13 rebounds in a 120–115 loss. Five days later, he scored 30 points in a 97–86 win over the Detroit Pistons. On 30 October, he had 22 points, nine rebounds, five assists and two steals in 25 minutes in a 115–107 win over the Houston Rockets, becoming just the third player to post such numbers in 25 minutes of play or less since 1983–84, joining Pau Gasol (2015) and Fat Lever (1990). On 15 November, Embiid scored a then-career high 46 points—the most by a Philadelphia player in 11 years—and grabbed 15 rebounds in a 115–109 win over the Los Angeles Lakers. Embiid also had seven assists and seven blocked shots, making him the first NBA player with 40 points, seven assists and seven blocks in a game since Julius Erving against the Pistons in 1982. Embiid shot 14 for 20 from the field and 16 of 19 at the free throw line, giving him the most points by a Sixers player since Allen Iverson scored 46 against the Chicago Bulls in 2006. In addition, the previous 35 times someone scored at least 44 for the 76ers, it was Iverson.

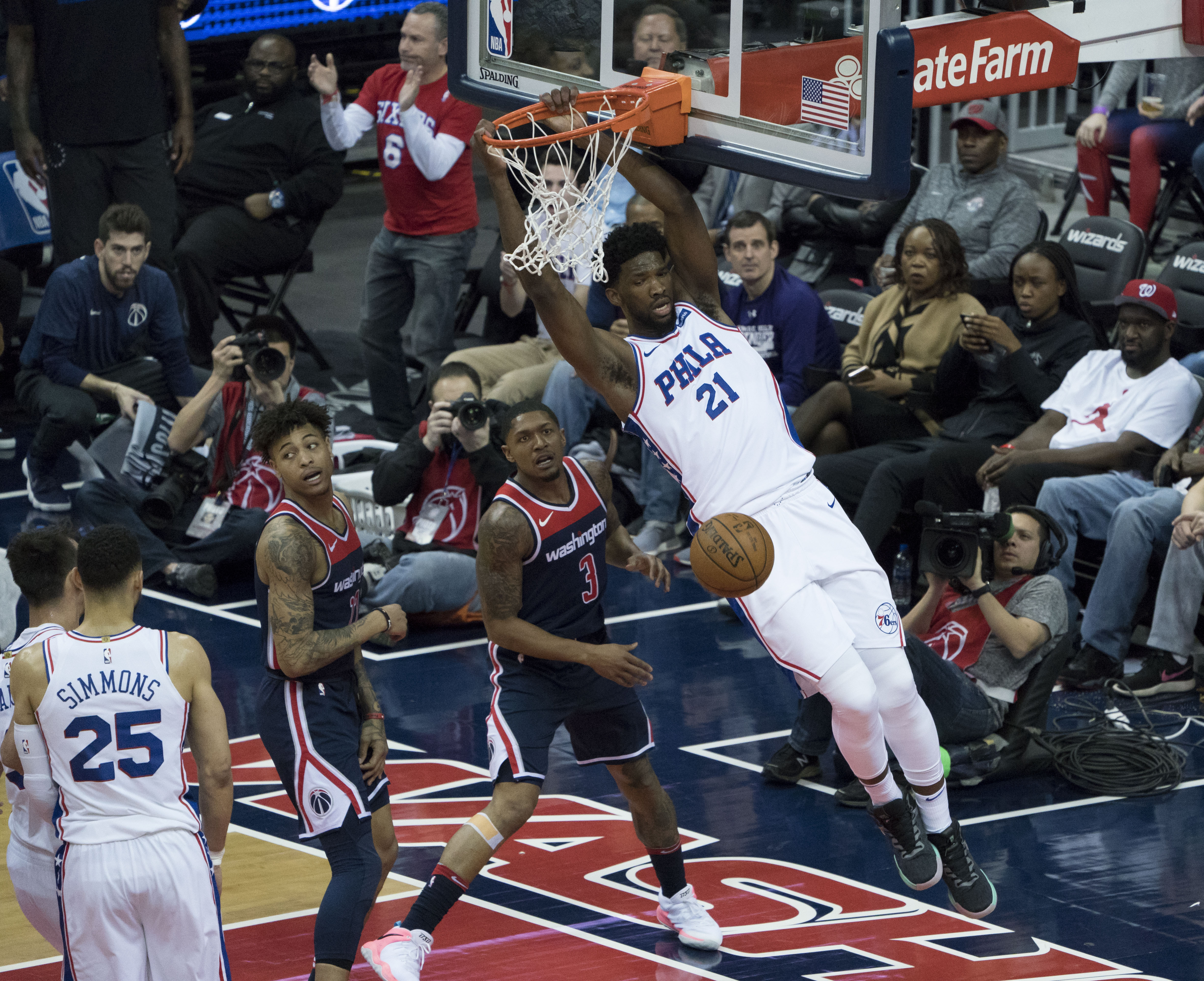
Embiid dunking the basketball in 2018

On 18 January, he was named a starter for the 2018 NBA All-Star Game, becoming the first Philadelphia player selected as an All-Star starter since Allen Iverson in the 2009–10 season, and the first Sixers All-Star since Jrue Holiday in 2013. Later that day, he scored 26 points and matched a then-career best with 16 rebounds in an 89–80 win over the Boston Celtics. He was subsequently named Eastern Conference Player of the Week for games played between Monday, 15 January and Sunday, 21 January. On 10 February, he had 29 points and tied a then-career high with 16 rebounds in a 112–98 win over the Los Angeles Clippers. Two days later, he was named Eastern Conference Player of the Week for games played between Monday, 5 February and Sunday, 11 February. On 15 March, he scored 29 points in a 118–110 win over the New York Knicks, becoming the first Sixers player to notch 40 20-point performances in a season since Andre Iguodala in 2007–08. A day later, on his 24th birthday, Embiid had 24 points and a then-career high 19 rebounds in a 120–116 win over the Brooklyn Nets. On 28 March against the Knicks, Embiid suffered an orbital fracture of his left eye. He underwent surgery three days later, with a two-week return date the likely outcome.

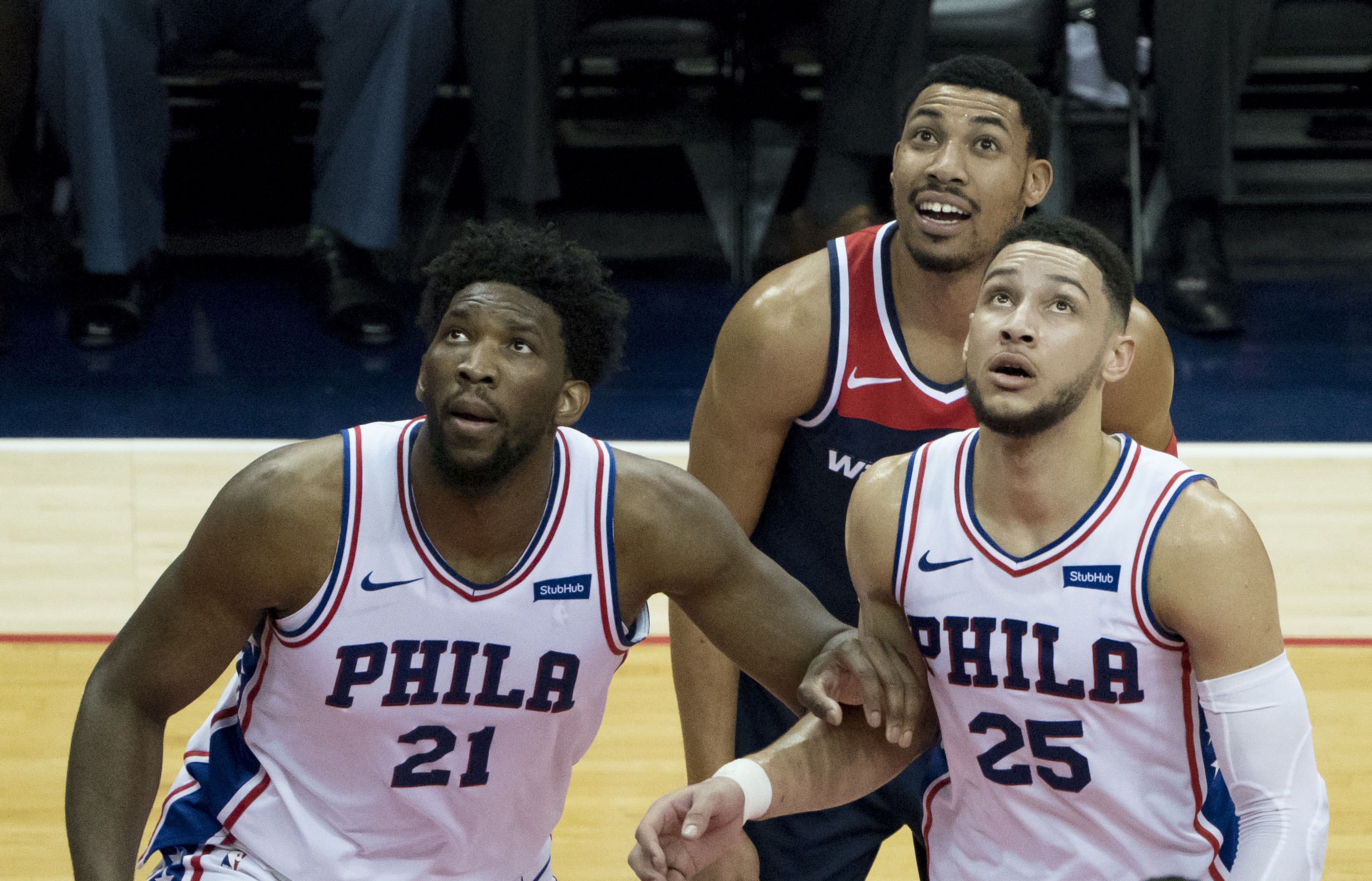
Embiid with Ben Simmons in 2018

After missing the first two games of the 76ers' first-round playoff series against the Miami Heat with the left eye injury, Embiid made his playoff debut in Game 3 on 19 April. He helped the 76ers take a 2–1 lead in the series with a 128–108 win behind his 23 points. Embiid helped the 76ers move on to the second round of the playoffs with a 4–1 defeat of the Heat, as he recorded 19 points and 12 rebounds in a 104–91 win in Game 5. In Game 1 of the 76ers' second-round series against the Celtics, Embiid recorded 31 points and 13 rebounds in a 117–101 loss. The 76ers went on to lose to the Celtics in five games, with Embiid recording 27 points and 12 rebounds in a 114–112 loss in Game 5. Embiid said in his postgame press conference after Game 5 that he felt there should have been a foul called on his potential game-tying layup attempt with under 20 seconds left. The NBA later confirmed that a foul should have been called on the play.

==== 2018–19 season: Playoff disappointment ====
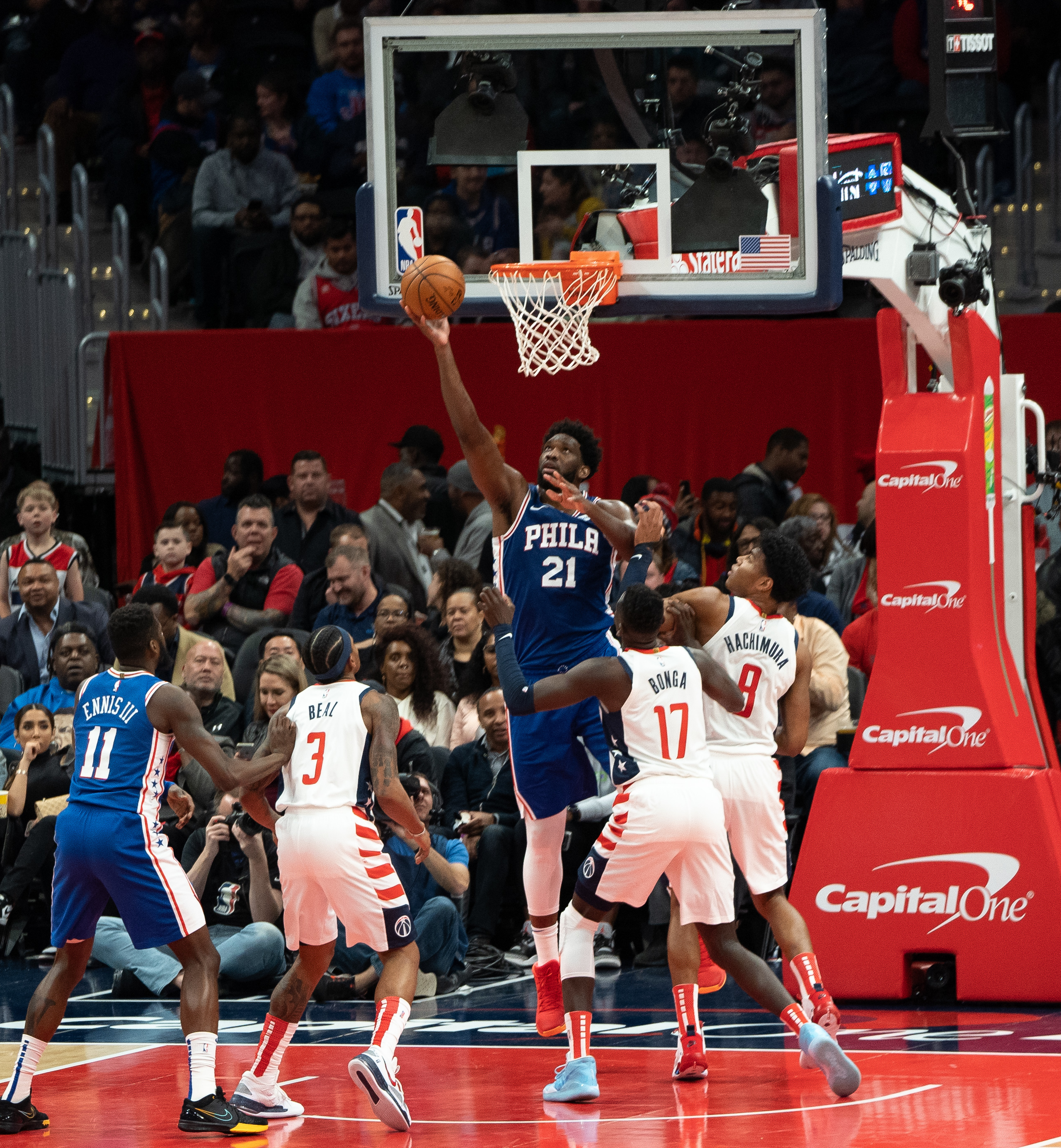
Embiid attacking the basket in 2019

On 24 October 2018, Embiid had 30 points and 19 rebounds in a 123–108 loss to the Milwaukee Bucks, becoming the franchise's first player to reach those marks in the same game since Charles Barkley did so in November 1991. On 27 October, he had 27 points and 14 rebounds in a 105–103 win over the Charlotte Hornets, thus registering a double-double in all six games to start the season. He became one of seven players with 2,000 points, 1,000 rebounds and 200 blocks in his first 100 games, joining Tim Duncan, Shaquille O'Neal, Alonzo Mourning, David Robinson, Hakeem Olajuwon and Ralph Sampson. On 1 November, he had 41 points and 13 rebounds in a 122–113 win over the Los Angeles Clippers. Two days later, he recorded 39 points and 17 rebounds in a 109–99 win over the Detroit Pistons. Thirty-two of his 39 points came in the first half, the highest for a Sixer since Allen Iverson had 33 points in the first half on 18 December 2004 against the Milwaukee Bucks. On 9 November, he recorded 42 points and 18 rebounds in a 133–132 overtime win over the Hornets. On 14 November, he recorded his first career triple-double with 19 points, 13 rebounds and 10 assists in a 111–106 loss to the Orlando Magic. On 14 December, he recorded 40 points and 21 rebounds in a 113–101 loss to the Indiana Pacers, becoming the first Sixers player with at least 30 points and 20 rebounds in a game since Barkley on 7 December 1990. On 2 January, he matched his season high with 42 points, including 30 in the first half, and grabbed 18 rebounds in a 132–127 win over the Phoenix Suns. On 10 March, he returned from an eight-game absence with a sore left knee and recorded 33 points and 12 rebounds in a 106–89 win over the Pacers. On 17 March, he had 40 points and 15 rebounds in a 130–125 win over the Bucks. On 20 March, Embiid scored 37 points and had a career-high 22 rebounds in a 118–115 win over the Boston Celtics. On 28 March, he had 39 points, 13 rebounds and six assists in a 123–110 win over the Brooklyn Nets. On 4 April, he returned from a three-game absence and had 34 points, 13 rebounds, 13 assists and three blocks in a 128–122 loss to the Bucks. He joined Wilt Chamberlain as the only other big man in team history with multiple triple-doubles in the same season. Embiid finished the season missing 14 games after the All-Star break, including five of the final seven games, due to rest and injury. In Game 4 of the 76ers' first-round playoff series against the Nets, Embiid had 31 points, 16 rebounds, seven assists and six blocks in a 112–108 win. Embiid battled through illness and flu-like symptoms during the second round of the playoffs, which the Sixers lost in seven games to the Toronto Raptors, despite his 21-point, 11-rebound outing in a 92–90 closeout loss in Game 7, won by a shot by Kawhi Leonard, which bounced off the rim several times before it dropped through the hoop at the buzzer.

==== 2019–20 season: First round exit ====
On 31 October 2019, Embiid was suspended for two games without pay due to an altercation with Karl-Anthony Towns during a game against the Minnesota Timberwolves. On 25 November, Embiid grabbed a game-high 13 rebounds but went scoreless in an NBA game for the first time in his career in the 76ers' 101–96 loss to the Toronto Raptors. On 20 February 2020, Embiid scored a then-season-high 39 points, along with 16 rebounds, to lead Philadelphia to a 112–104 overtime win against the Brooklyn Nets. Four days later, Embiid scored a then-career high 49 points and recorded 14 rebounds in a 129–112 win against the Atlanta Hawks. On 1 August, Embiid scored 41 points, as well as 21 rebounds, in a 127–121 loss to the Indiana Pacers. This was the 76ers’ first game in the Orlando bubble, returning from a four-month hiatus due to the COVID-19 pandemic. In the playoffs, the Sixers were eliminated in the first round despite Embiid averaging a then-playoff career-high 30 points per game.

==== 2020–21 season: MVP runner-up ====
On 20 February 2021, Embiid recorded a double-double with a then-career-high 50 points and 17 rebounds in the 76ers' 112–105 win against the Chicago Bulls. Embiid finished the regular season with a then-career-high 28.5 points, 10.6 rebounds and 2.8 assists in 51 games played, leading the Sixers to the best record in the Eastern Conference. He was second in NBA Most Valuable Player Award voting. On 8 June, Embiid had a then-playoff career-high 40 points alongside 13 rebounds, in a second round win against the Atlanta Hawks. Philadelphia would go on to lose to Atlanta in seven games despite Embiid averaging 30.4 points, 12.7 rebounds and 3.9 assists.

==== 2021–22 season: First scoring title ====
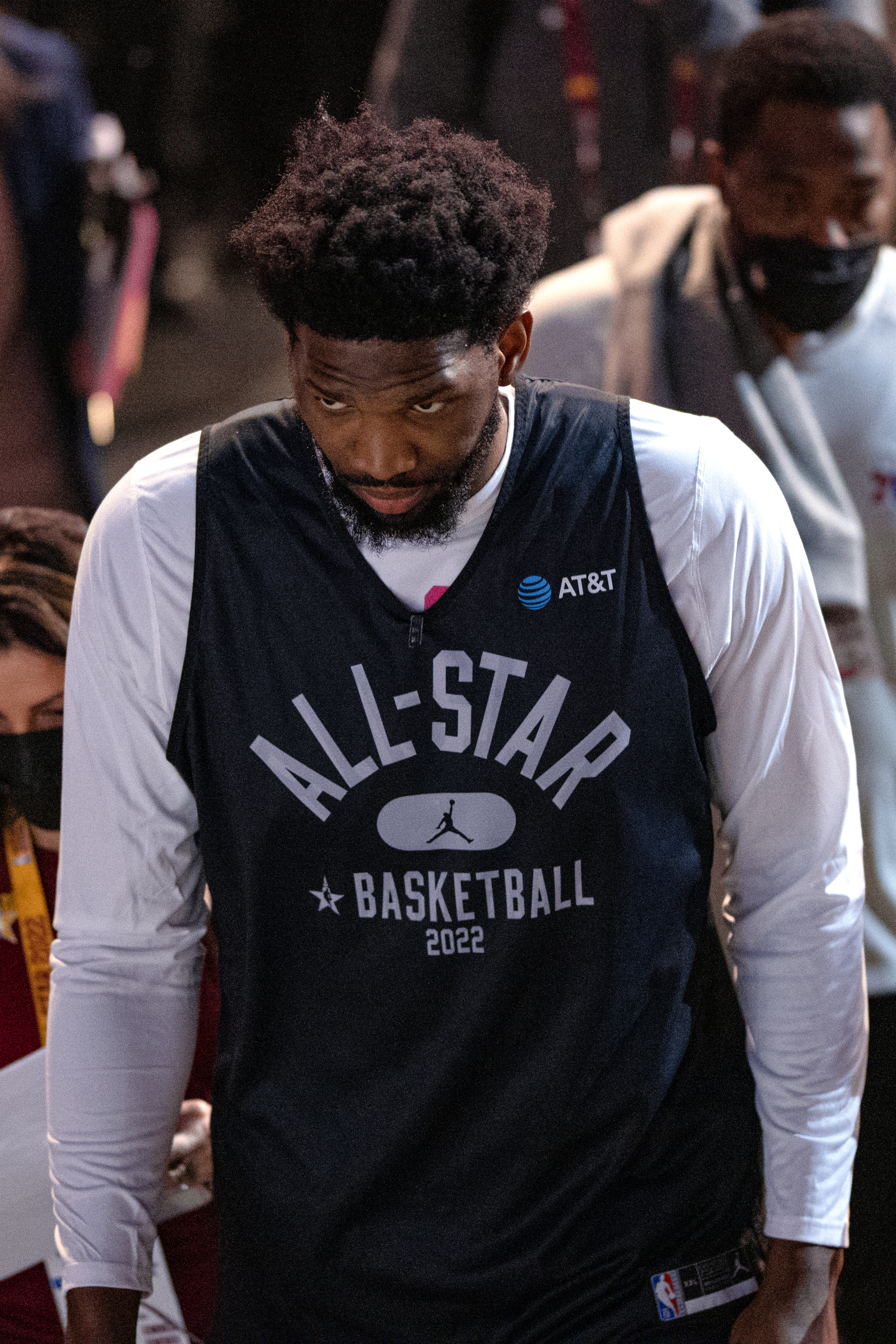
Embiid at the 2022 NBA All-Star Game

On 17 August 2021, Embiid signed a four-year, $196 million extension with the 76ers. Embiid missed nine games due to testing positive for COVID-19. In his first game back, he scored 42 points and recorded 14 rebounds in a 121–120 double-overtime loss against the Minnesota Timberwolves. On 6 December, Embiid scored 43 points, grabbed 15 rebounds, and dished out seven assists on 15-of-20 shooting from the field in a 127–124 overtime win over the Charlotte Hornets.

On 19 January 2022, Embiid matched his then-career high of 50 points on 17-for-23 shooting from the field, along with 12 rebounds and three blocks, in a 123–110 win over the Orlando Magic. On 12 February, Embiid logged his fourth career triple-double with 40 points, 14 rebounds, 10 assists and three steals in a 103–93 win over the Cleveland Cavaliers. He became the first Sixers player with a 40-point triple-double since Wilt Chamberlain in 1968. On 17 February, Embiid had 42 points, 14 rebounds and five assists in a 123–120 win over the reigning champions Milwaukee Bucks. On 9 April, Embiid had 41 points, a season-high 20 rebounds, four assists and two steals on 14-of-17 shooting from the field in a 133–120 win over the Indiana Pacers. Since the introduction of shot clock in 1954–55, Embiid became the fifth player in NBA history to score at least 40 points and grab 20 rebounds while shooting 80 percent or better from the field, joining former NBA All-Star John Drew and Hall of Famers Charles Barkley, Wilt Chamberlain and Bob Pettit. At the end of the regular season, Embiid was named the NBA scoring champion, averaging 30.6 points per game, becoming the first center to do so since Shaquille O'Neal in 2000, and also the first center to average over 30 points per game since Moses Malone in 1982. Embiid also became the first foreign player to win an NBA scoring title and the first Sixer to lead the league in scoring since Allen Iverson won the title for the fourth and final time in 2005.

On 18 April, during Game 2 of the first round of the playoffs, Embiid recorded a double-double of 31 points and 11 rebounds in a 112–97 win over the Toronto Raptors. On 20 April, during Game 3 of the first round, Embiid scored a game-winning three-pointer with under 1 second left in overtime against the Raptors. He finished the game with 33 points and 13 rebounds. During that game, Embiid injured his thumb and was relegated to a soft cast for the second half of the game and during the following Friday practice. After the game it was reported that he was experiencing "pain and discomfort". Although Embiid played through the pain in Game 4 and scored 21 points and had eight rebounds, the 76ers fell to the Toronto Raptors in a 110–102 loss. It was later reported that Embiid would require surgery on the thumb, but that he would postpone the surgery until the end of the 76ers' season. On 28 April, Embiid had 33 points, 10 rebounds and three blocks to lead the 76ers to a 132–97 win in Game 6 to end their first round series. The next day, the Sixers announced that Embiid had suffered a mild concussion and a right orbital fracture and would be out indefinitely. Because of the injury, Embiid missed the first two games of the Eastern Conference Semifinals where Philadelphia would go on to lose to Miami in six games. On 30 May, Embiid underwent right thumb surgery and a procedure on his left index finger.

==== 2022–23 season: First MVP and second scoring title ====
On 13 November 2022, Embiid scored a career-high 59 points along with 11 rebounds, eight assists and seven blocks in a 105–98 victory over the Utah Jazz, with 26 points and five blocks coming in the fourth quarter. He became the first player in NBA history with 50 points, 10 boards, five assists and five blocks in a game since blocks became an official stat in the 1973–74 season. This was also the fifth-best scoring performance in 76ers franchise history. He managed to top 101 total points in less than 24 hours, following up a 42-point, 10-rebound and six-assist performance on 12 November in a 121–109 win over the Atlanta Hawks. On 11 December, Embiid had 53 points and 11 rebounds, leading the Philadelphia 76ers to a 131–113 win over the Charlotte Hornets. He became the third player in 76ers franchise history to have multiple 50-point games in the same season, joining Allen Iverson (2000–01 and 2004–05) and Wilt Chamberlain (1965–66 and 1967–68). It is also the 30th game in Embiid's career with 40 points and 10 rebounds. The only other player in franchise history to accomplish that feat was Chamberlain. On 23 December, Embiid put up 44 points and seven rebounds in a 119–114 win over the Los Angeles Clippers. He also tied Wilt Chamberlain for the second-most 40-point games in 76ers franchise history. On 27 December, Embiid put up 48 points, 11 rebound, three steals and three blocks in a 116–111 loss to the Washington Wizards. He also surpassed Wilt Chamberlain for the second-most 40-point games in 76ers franchise history. On 3 January, Embiid was awarded the Eastern Conference Player of the Month award for his play during the month of December, the fifth of his career, breaking a tie with Allen Iverson for the most such honors in 76ers franchise history.

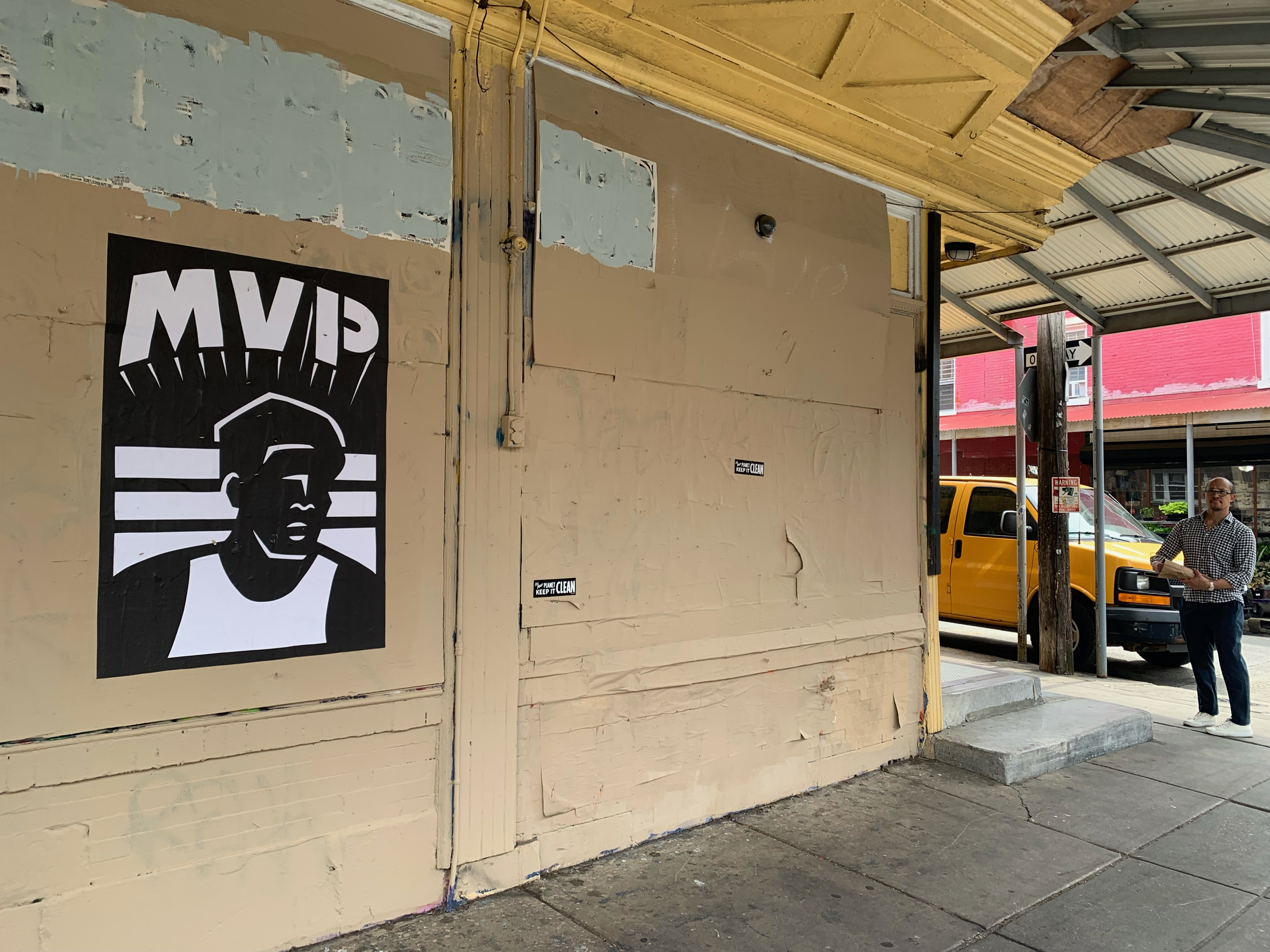
Joe Boruchow's Embiid MVP poster on S 9th St by Montrose in Philadelphia's Italian Market in April 2023

On 28 January, Embiid recorded 47 points, a season-high 18 rebounds, 5 assists, 3 steals and 2 blocks in a 126–119 win over the Denver Nuggets. He became the second player in 76ers franchise history to produce at least four games of 45-plus points, 15-plus rebounds and five-plus assists, joining Wilt Chamberlain. Embiid also became just the third player in NBA history to record at least 47 points, 18 rebounds, five assists, three steals and two blocked shots. He joined Hall of Famers Chris Webber (5 January 2001) and Bob McAdoo (18 March 1975) with such games. For his play in January, Embiid took home the Eastern Conference Player of the Month, the sixth of his career and second in a row. He scored a league-best 34.9 points, 10.7 rebounds, 3.2 assists, 1.0 steals and 1.6 blocks in 10 games during the month. On 15 February, Embiid scored his 10,000th career point in a game against the Cleveland Cavaliers. He also surpassed Allen Iverson as the fastest player to reach 10,000 career points in 76ers franchise history, doing so in just 373 games. On 26 February, Embiid put up 41 points, 12 rebounds, five assists and three blocks in a 110–107 loss to the Boston Celtics. He also surpassed Wilt Chamberlain for the most games with at least 40 points, 10 rebounds and five assists in 76ers franchise history. On 9 March, he put up 39 points, seven rebounds, four assists, two steals, three blocks and a game-winning fadeaway jumpshot in a 120–119 win over the Portland Trail Blazers. On 18 March, Embiid put up 31 points, seven rebounds and seven assists in a 141–121 win over the Indiana Pacers. He also put up his ninth consecutive 30-point game, surpassing Allen Iverson and Wilt Chamberlain for the most consecutive games with at least 30 points in 76ers franchise history. On 4 April, Embiid scored 52 points on 20-of-25 shooting from the field, along with 13 rebounds, six assists and two blocks in a 103–101 win over the Boston Celtics. He became just the second player in NBA history to produce a stat line of at least 50–10–5 while shooting 80% or better. Embiid also joined Wilt Chamberlain and Kareem Abdul-Jabbar as the only three centers to have three 50-plus-point games in a season in NBA history. On 9 April, Embiid was named the NBA scoring champion, averaging 33.1 points per game, doing so for the second straight season. He also joined James Harden as the first pair of teammates to lead the NBA in scoring and assists in a season since George Gervin and Johnny Moore did so in the 1981–82 season. On 2 May, Embiid won the NBA Most Valuable Player Award. He became the fifth 76er ever to capture league MVP honors, joining Hall of Famers Wilt Chamberlain, Julius Erving, Allen Iverson and Moses Malone.

In Game 4 of the Eastern Conference Semifinals, Embiid put up 34 points and 13 rebounds in a 116–115 overtime win against the Boston Celtics. He also tied Wilt Chamberlain for the most 30-point and 10-rebound playoff games in 76ers franchise history. The 76ers eventually lost the series to the Celtics in seven games.

==== 2023–24 season: Career high in scoring and knee surgery ====
On 6 November 2023, Embiid posted 48 points, 11 rebounds and 6 assists on 17–25 shooting from the field in a 146–128 victory over the Washington Wizards. He scored 29 points on 10–10 shooting in the 3rd quarter, joining LeBron James (10–10, 4 January 2008) and Klay Thompson (13–13, 23 January 2015) as the only players since 1997–98 season to shoot 10-for-10 or better in a quarter. Embiid also recorded his sixth 45-point, 10-rebound, 5-assist game, passing Wilt Chamberlain for most in Sixers history. Additionally, he became the first player in the shot clock era (since 1954–55 season) to have 45 points, 10 rebounds and 5 assists while being on the court less than 31 minutes. On 6 December, Embiid scored 50 points along with 12 rebounds and seven assists in a 131–126 win over the Washington Wizards. On 15 December, Embiid put up 35 points, 13 rebounds, four blocks, two assists, two steals in a 124–92 win over the Detroit Pistons. He also surpassed Wilt Chamberlain for the most consecutive 30-point and 10-rebound games with nine in Sixers history. On 20 December, Embiid scored a season-high 51 points and grabbed 12 rebounds in a 127–113 win over the Minnesota Timberwolves. He also recorded his 12th straight game with 30 or more points and 10-plus rebounds. It is the NBA's longest such streak since Kareem Abdul-Jabbar did it in 16 straight games for the Milwaukee Bucks in the 1971–72 season. Embiid finished the month of December averaging 40.2 PPG, 12.6 RPG and 4.9 APG on shooting splits of 60.6/42.3/92.1. With these numbers, he became the first player in NBA history to average 40 or more points in a month on 60% field goal shooting.

On 2 January 2024, Embiid put up a triple-double with 31 points, 15 rebounds and 10 assists through playing only the first three quarters in a 110–97 win over the Chicago Bulls. He became the first player in NBA history to put up at least 30 points, 15 rebounds and 10 assists in a game without playing in the fourth quarter. On 15 January, Embiid posted 41 points and 10 rebounds in a 124–115 win over the Houston Rockets. He recorded his 16th straight game with 30 or more points and 10-plus rebounds, tying Kareem Abdul-Jabbar. The next day, Embiid logged 41 points, seven rebounds and 10 assists in a 126–121 win over the Denver Nuggets. He had his 18th straight 30-point game, tying Hall of Famer Elgin Baylor for the sixth-longest streak in NBA history. On 20 January, Embiid put up 33 points, 10 rebounds, five assists and three blocks in a 97–89 win over the Charlotte Hornets. He had his 20th straight 30-point game, joining James Harden and Wilt Chamberlain as the only players in NBA history to score at least 30 points in 20-plus consecutive games. On 22 January, Embiid scored 70 points along with 18 rebounds and five assists in a 133–123 win over the San Antonio Spurs, breaking the Sixers franchise record for most points in a game previously set by Wilt Chamberlain in 1967. With the performance, Embiid also became the ninth player in NBA history to score 70 or more points in a game, and the third center to reach the mark, joining Chamberlain and David Robinson. He also became the first player in NBA history to score at least 70 points, 15 rebounds and five assists in a game. On 1 February, it was announced Embiid would miss multiple games with a lateral meniscus injury in his left knee after Jonathan Kuminga of the Golden State Warriors fell on his knee diving for a ball in a game a few days earlier. On 2 April, Embiid returned from knee surgery and finished with 24 points, six rebounds, seven assists and three steals, leading the 76ers to a 109–105 win over the Oklahoma City Thunder.

On 25 April 2024, Embiid put up a playoff career-high 50 points along with eight rebounds and four assists in the Sixers' 125–114 victory in Game 3 of the first round of the playoffs against the New York Knicks. In the press conference after the game, he stated that he had been diagnosed with Bell's Palsy and had been dealing with migraines and blurred vision. In Game 5, Embiid recorded his first playoff triple-double with 19 points, 16 rebounds, 10 assists and four blocks in the Sixers' 112–106 overtime win over the Knicks. Philadelphia would go on to lose to New York in six games despite Embiid's 39-point and 13-rebound outing in the 118–115 close-out loss in Game 6. He finished the playoffs averaging a career-high 33.0 points, 10.8 rebounds, and a career-high 5.7 assists.

==== 2024–25 season: Dealing with injuries ====
On September 19, 2024, Embiid signed a three-year, $193 million extension, which would keep him under contract through the 2028–29 season.

On November 2, Embiid shoved a reporter in the locker room following a loss to the Memphis Grizzlies after the columnist had allegedly written an article pertaining to Embiid's son and his late brother. Three days later, Embiid received a three-game suspension for the altercation, which would not begin until he was able to return from injury, as he missed the start of the season due to a knee ailment. On November 21, it was reported that in an hour-long meeting involving players and coaches, Tyrese Maxey criticized Embiid for regularly being late to team activities.

On February 4, 2025, Embiid returned after a left knee injury sidelined him the previous 15 games. He recorded his eighth career triple-double with 29 points, 11 rebounds and 10 assists in a 118–116 win over the Dallas Mavericks. On February 28, the 76ers announced that Embiid would miss the remainder of the season due to ongoing issues with his left knee. In 19 total starts for Philadelphia during the 2024–25 NBA season, he averaged 23.8 points, 8.2 rebounds, and 4.5 assists. On April 11, Embiid underwent arthroscopic surgery on his left knee.

==== 2025–26 season: Minutes restriction and back-to-back management ====
Embiid started the 2025–26 season on a minutes restriction due to left knee injury management, limiting him to 20 minutes a game and additionally excluding him from playing back-to-back games. On December 12, 2025, Embiid scored a then-season-high 39 points and grabbed nine rebounds in a 115–105 win over the Indiana Pacers. On January 22, 2026, Embiid recorded a triple-double with 32 points, 15 rebounds and 10 assists in a 128–122 overtime win over the Houston Rockets. On January 31, Embiid scored a season-high 40 points and grabbed 11 rebounds in a 124–114 victory over the New Orleans Pelicans. He made 38 starts for the 76ers during the year, averaging 26.9 points, 7.7 rebounds, and 3.9 assists. On April 9, Embiid underwent emergency surgery after being diagnosed with appendicitis, ending his regular season. On April 26, Embiid returned in time for the playoffs, where he scored 26 points in a 128–96 loss to the Boston Celtics in Game 4 of the first round. In the deciding Game 7, Embiid had 34 points, 12 rebounds, and six assists as the 76ers won 109–100, while overcoming a 3–1 series deficit for the first time in franchise history. Embiid also won a Game 7 for the first time in his career. Embiid played all but one game in the second round, where the 76ers were swept by the eventual champion New York Knicks.

== National team career ==
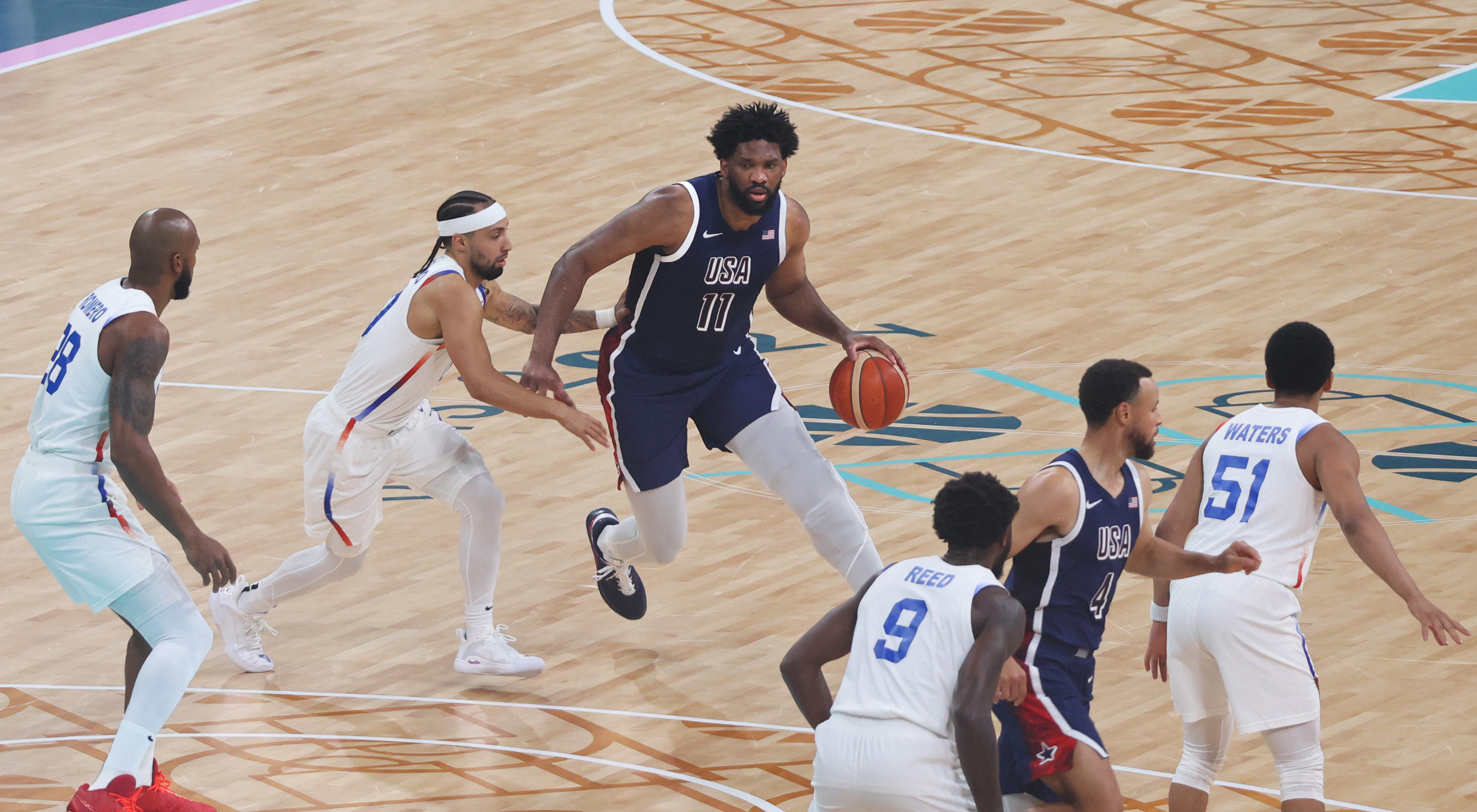
Embiid playing in the 2024 Summer Olympics for the United States national team in a game versus the Puerto Rico national team. He received booing from the French fans at the Olympics for choosing to represent the United States over France.

Embiid was eligible to compete for the national teams of Cameroon, France, and United States. On 7 February 2017, Embiid was named to the preliminary Cameroon team to compete in the 2017 FIBA AfroBasket in the Republic of Congo, with the group qualifier taking place in March, during the NBA regular season. Fellow Cameroon-born NBA player Luc Mbah a Moute has voiced his opinion on Embiid representing his country saying, "It would be great for our team, our country and Joel". Embiid ultimately did not play for Cameroon.

In July 2022, Embiid was granted citizenship by France as "a foreigner [...] whose naturalization is of exceptional interest". Later in September, he also became a U.S. citizen. He had spoken to French President Emmanuel Macron on the phone, as Macron had courted him to play for the France national team.

Embiid committed to play for the 2024 U.S. Olympic team in Paris, stating that he wanted to win a gold medal for his son, who was born in the U.S.

After talking to my family, I knew it had to be Team USA. I want to play with my brothers in the league. I want to play for my fans because they’ve been incredible since the day I came here. But most of all, I want to honor my son who was born in the US. I want my boy to know I played my first Olympics for him.

During the Olympics, Embiid was frequently booed by French fans over his decision to play for the United States. He helped Team USA win the gold medal, and in five games, he averaged 11.2 points, 3.8 rebounds, 1.4 assists and a block per game while shooting 56.8% from the field.

Embiid has not ruled out playing for Cameroon in the future. However, he would need permission from FIBA and the United States men's national basketball team in order to do so in 2028.

== Personal life ==
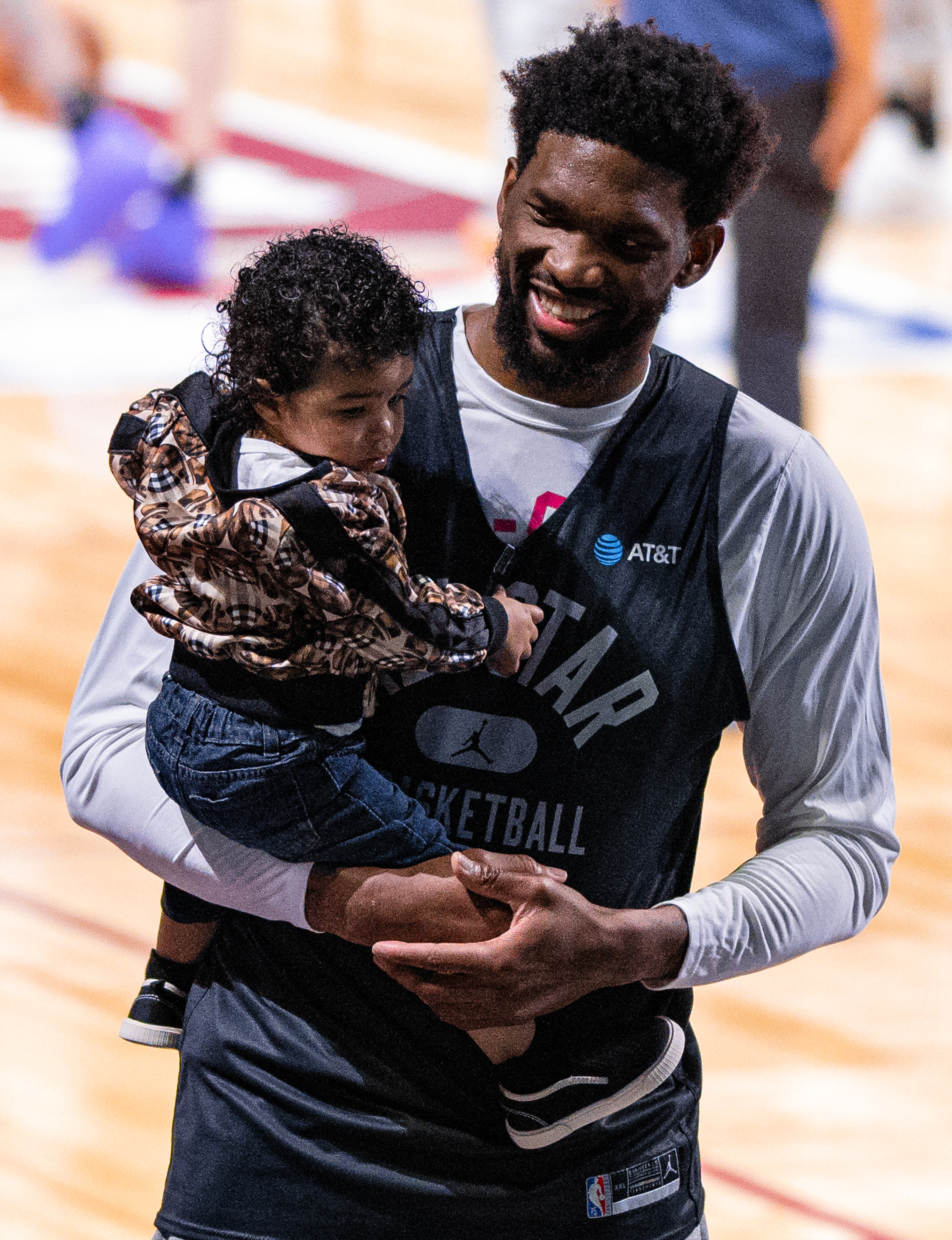
Embiid with his son at the NBA All-Star Game in 2022

Embiid's younger brother, Arthur, died on 16 October 2014, in a car crash in his home country of Cameroon. He also has a younger sister. In addition to English, Embiid is fluent in French and Basaa. Embiid has been in a relationship with Brazilian model Anne de Paula since 2018. In September 2020, she gave birth to a son. The couple was married in July 2023.

Embiid is known for his playful personality and social media presence, particularly for his trolling. He is Catholic and a teetotaler.

Embiid is an avid supporter of Real Madrid CF, frequently posting on Twitter during the team's matches.

In March 2021, Embiid donated $100,000, his 2021 NBA All-Star Game winnings, to fight homelessness in Philadelphia, for which he received the NBA Cares Community Assist Award in April 2021.

== Business interests ==
In 2023, Embiid founded Miniature Géant, a production studio, in partnership with LeBron James's SpringHill Company. The studio's focus is on African storytelling with an initial emphasis on sports. Sarah Kazadi-Ndoye, Miniature Géant's creative head described the studio's projects as having the "common denominator [of] Africa and the joys and the quest of African people and the African diaspora."

In 2024, Miniature Géant announced two projects: a documentary about Dutch-Ghanaian soccer star Memphis Depay and Backline, a narrative feature about African athletes breaking into professional American football. The movie will be written and directed by Editi Effiong, director of the hit Netflix film The Black Book, and will be produced in conjunction with LeBron James' production company Uninterrupted. Production was set to begin in 2025 with filming split between Nigeria and the United States. The company’s initial development slate also includes an adaptation of Sebastian Abbot’s non-fiction book "The Away Game: The Epic Search for Soccer’s Next Superstars", about a group of 13-year-old African boys scouted to join a prestigious soccer academy, as well as documentary about Cameroonian mixed martial arts fighter Francis Ngannou.

Embiid had a five-year sneaker sponsorship deal with Under Armour that expired in 2022. In 2024, Embiid officially announced a new sneaker deal with Skechers.

== Awards and honors ==
NBA

- NBA Most Valuable Player: 2023
- 7× NBA All-Star: 2018–2024
- 5x All-NBA Team selections:
  - All-NBA First Team: 2023
  - 4× All-NBA Second Team: 2018, 2019, 2021, 2022
- 3× NBA All-Defensive Second Team: 2018, 2019, 2021
- 2× NBA scoring champion: 2022, 2023
- 3× NBA free throw scoring leaders: 2021, 2022, 2023
- NBA All-Rookie First Team: 2017

USA Basketball

- Olympics gold medalist: 2024

College

- Second-team All-Big 12: 2014
- Big 12 Defensive Player of the Year: 2014
- Big 12 All-Defensive Team: 2014
- Big 12 All-Newcomer Team: 2014

== Career statistics ==
Legend
| GP | Games played | GS | Games started | MPG | Minutes per game |
| FG% | Field goal percentage | 3P% | 3-point field goal percentage | FT% | Free throw percentage |
| RPG | Rebounds per game | APG | Assists per game | SPG | Steals per game |
| BPG | Blocks per game | PPG | Points per game | **Bold** | Career high |
| * | Led the league |

=== NBA ===
==== Regular season ====
| Year | Team | GP | GS | MPG | FG% | 3P% | FT% | RPG | APG | SPG | BPG | PPG |
|---|---|---|---|---|---|---|---|---|---|---|---|---|
| 2016–17 | Philadelphia | 31 | 31 | 25.4 | .466 | .367 | .783 | 7.8 | 2.1 | .9 | **2.5** | 20.2 |
| 2017–18 | Philadelphia | 63 | 63 | 30.4 | .483 | .308 | .769 | 11.0 | 3.2 | .6 | 1.8 | 22.9 |
| 2018–19 | Philadelphia | 64 | 64 | 33.7 | .484 | .300 | .804 | **13.6** | 3.7 | .7 | 1.9 | 27.5 |
| 2019–20 | Philadelphia | 51 | 51 | 29.5 | .477 | .331 | .807 | 11.6 | 3.0 | .9 | 1.3 | 23.0 |
| 2020–21 | Philadelphia | 51 | 51 | 31.1 | .513 | .377 | .859 | 10.6 | 2.8 | 1.0 | 1.4 | 28.5 |
| 2021–22 | Philadelphia | **68** | **68** | 33.8 | .499 | .371 | .814 | 11.7 | 4.2 | 1.1 | 1.5 | 30.6* |
| 2022–23 | Philadelphia | 66 | 66 | **34.6** | **.548** | .330 | .857 | 10.2 | 4.2 | 1.0 | 1.7 | 33.1* |
| 2023–24 | Philadelphia | 39 | 39 | 33.6 | .529 | **.388** | **.883** | 11.0 | **5.6** | **1.2** | 1.7 | **34.7** |
| 2024–25 | Philadelphia | 19 | 19 | 30.2 | .444 | .299 | .882 | 8.2 | 4.5 | .7 | .9 | 23.8 |
| 2025–26 | Philadelphia | 38 | 38 | 31.6 | .489 | .333 | .854 | 7.7 | 3.9 | .6 | 1.2 | 26.9 |
| Career | | 490 | 490 | 31.9 | .500 | .339 | .830 | 10.8 | 3.7 | .9 | 1.6 | 27.6 |
| All-Star | | 5 | 5 | 26.1 | .623 | .440 | .750 | 9.4 | 2.2 | .6 | .8 | 23.8 |

==== Playoffs ====
| Year | Team | GP | GS | MPG | FG% | 3P% | FT% | RPG | APG | SPG | BPG | PPG |
|---|---|---|---|---|---|---|---|---|---|---|---|---|
| 2018 | Philadelphia | 8 | 8 | 34.8 | .435 | .276 | .705 | **12.6** | 3.0 | .9 | 1.9 | 21.4 |
| 2019 | Philadelphia | **11** | **11** | 30.4 | .428 | .308 | .822 | 10.5 | 3.4 | .7 | 2.3 | 20.2 |
| 2020 | Philadelphia | 4 | 4 | 36.2 | .459 | .250 | .814 | 12.3 | 1.3 | **1.5** | 1.3 | 30.0 |
| 2021 | Philadelphia | **11** | **11** | 32.4 | **.513** | **.390** | .835 | 10.5 | 3.4 | 1.0 | 1.5 | 28.1 |
| 2022 | Philadelphia | 10 | 10 | 38.5 | .484 | .212 | .820 | 10.7 | 2.1 | .4 | .8 | 23.6 |
| 2023 | Philadelphia | 9 | 9 | 37.4 | .431 | .179 | **.905** | 9.8 | 2.7 | .7 | **2.8** | 23.7 |
| 2024 | Philadelphia | 6 | 6 | **41.4** | .444 | .333 | .859 | 10.8 | **5.7** | 1.2 | 1.5 | **33.0** |
| 2026 | Philadelphia | 7 | 7 | 33.3 | .460 | .179 | .831 | 7.3 | 5.4 | .3 | .9 | 24.0 |
| Career | | 66 | 66 | 35.1 | .459 | .277 | .828 | 10.5 | 3.3 | .8 | 1.6 | 24.8 |

=== College ===
| Year | Team | GP | GS | MPG | FG% | 3P% | FT% | RPG | APG | SPG | BPG | PPG |
|---|---|---|---|---|---|---|---|---|---|---|---|---|
| 2013–14 | Kansas | 28 | 20 | 23.1 | .626 | .200 | .685 | 8.1 | 1.4 | .9 | 2.6 | 11.2 |

== See also ==
- List of NBA players born outside the United States
- List of NBA annual scoring leaders
- List of NBA single-game scoring leaders
- List of NBA single-season scoring leaders
- List of NBA single-game playoff scoring leaders
- List of NBA All-Stars
