= SpringHill Company =

Media production company

- Type: Private
- Industry: Entertainment
- Predecessors: SpringHill Entertainment; Robot Company; Uninterrupted
- Founded: 2020; 6 years ago
- Founder: LeBron James; Maverick Carter
- Headquarters: Los Angeles, California, US
- Key people: LeBron James
- Products: Film; Television; Audio; Consulting; Marketing; Storytelling
- Parent: Fulwell Entertainment (2025–present)
- Website: www.springhillcompany.com

SpringHill Company is an entertainment development and production company founded in 2020 by LeBron James and Maverick Carter. Its board of directors includes Serena Williams. The company unites three earlier companies founded by James and Carter: SpringHill Entertainment, an entertainment production company founded in 2007, the Robot Company, an integrated marketing agency and brand and culture consultancy founded by Carter and James together with Paul Rivera, the creator of the talk show The Shop, and Uninterrupted, founded in 2015 with the aim to empower athletes by providing a platform that allows them to share their stories.

SpringHill Company signed a two-year scripted television deal with ABC Signature, a part of Disney Television Studios, in June 2020. In September 2020, the company signed a four-year first-look deal with Universal Pictures.

Like SpringHill Entertainment before, the company is named after the housing complex in Akron, Ohio, where James was raised.

In November 2024, it was announced that SpringHill Company would merge with Fulwell 73 with Leo Pearlman and Maverick Carter as co-CEOs of the merged company. The merger was finalized in February 2025, with both companies placed under the Fulwell Entertainment umbrella.

== Filmography ==
=== Films ===
Year	Film	Director	Distributor
2019	What's My Name: Muhammad Ali	Antoine Fuqua	HBO
2021	Dreamland: The Burning of Black Wall Street	Salima Koroma	CNN
2021	Space Jam: A New Legacy	Malcolm D. Lee	Warner Bros. Pictures
2022	Hustle	Jeremiah Zagar	Netflix
2022	Fantasy Football	Anton Cropper	Paramount+
2023	House Party	Calmatic	Warner Bros. Pictures
2023	Shooting Stars	Chris Robinson	Peacock
2023	Black Ice	Hubert Davis	Bell Media, Elevation Pictures (Canada); Lionsgate, Roadside Attractions (United States)
2024	Rez Ball	Sydney Freeland	Netflix
TBA	Blood Count	Peter Ramsey	Paramount Pictures
TBA	New Kid	Prentice Penny	Universal Pictures
TBA	Weekend Warriors	Stephen Chbosky	Apple Studios

=== Television ===
Year	Series	Distributor
2014–2017	Survivor's Remorse	Starz
2016–present	The Wall	NBC
2018–2020	Shut Up and Dribble	Showtime
2018–present	The Shop	HBO/YouTube
2019	Million Dollar Mile	CBS
2020	Self Made	Netflix
2021	The Playbook	Netflix
2021–present	Recipe for Change	YouTube
2023	The Crossover	Disney+
TBA	Fantasy Sports	Disney+
