= Black Ice (2022 film) =

- Film poster
- Directed by: Hubert Davis
- Written by: Hubert Davis
- Based on: Black Ice: The Lost History of the Colored Hockey League of the Maritimes, 1895-1925 by Darril Fosty and George Fosty
- Produced by: Vinay Virmani
- Cinematography: Chris Romeike
- Edited by: Eamonn O'Connor
- Music by: Simon Poole
- Production companies: First Take Entertainment; Uninterrupted Canada; Black Ice Productions
- Distributed by: Elevation Pictures
- Release date: September 10, 2022 (TIFF)
- Running time: 97 minutes
- Country: Canada
- Language: English
- Box office: $47,362

Black Ice is a 2022 Canadian documentary film, directed by Hubert Davis and produced by Vinay Virmani. Based in part on Darril Fosty and George Fosty's 2004 non-fiction book Black Ice: The Lost History of the Colored Hockey League of the Maritimes, 1895-1925, the film presents a history of the Coloured Hockey League of the Maritimes of the early 20th century, and the lingering history of anti-black racism in the sport of ice hockey.

Executive producers of the film included Drake, LeBron James and Maverick Carter.

The film premiered at the 2022 Toronto International Film Festival, where it was the winner of the People's Choice Award for Documentaries.

The film was named to TIFF's annual year-end Canada's Top Ten list for 2022.

== Reception ==
On the review aggregator website Rotten Tomatoes, 96% of 26 critics' reviews are positive, with an average rating of 7.5/10. The website's consensus reads: "Black Ice offers an enlightening -- and possibly enraging -- overview of institutional racism in professional hockey." Metacritic, which uses a weighted average, assigned the film a score of 82 out of 100, based on five critics, indicating "universal acclaim".

Michael Talbot-Haynes of Film Threat gave the film a score of 10 out of 10 and wrote, "Easily one of the most surprising and profound sports documentaries ever made, Black Ice, directed by Hubert Davis, features earth-shaking discoveries about black Canadians in the history of hockey."

Peyton Robinson of RogerEbert.com gave the film three out of four stars and wrote, "Through multi-generational testimony from Black hockey players, we learn about the racism endured by athletes from teammates, coaches, leagues, and fans alike who believe they don't belong in the sport. There's no timidity in the doc's testimonies. The film affords its subjects the same blunt expression that has been weaponized against them, and the result is unfiltered emotional depth that translates poignantly."

== See also ==
- Black players in ice hockey
- List of films about ice hockey
