= The Shop =

2018 American talk show television series

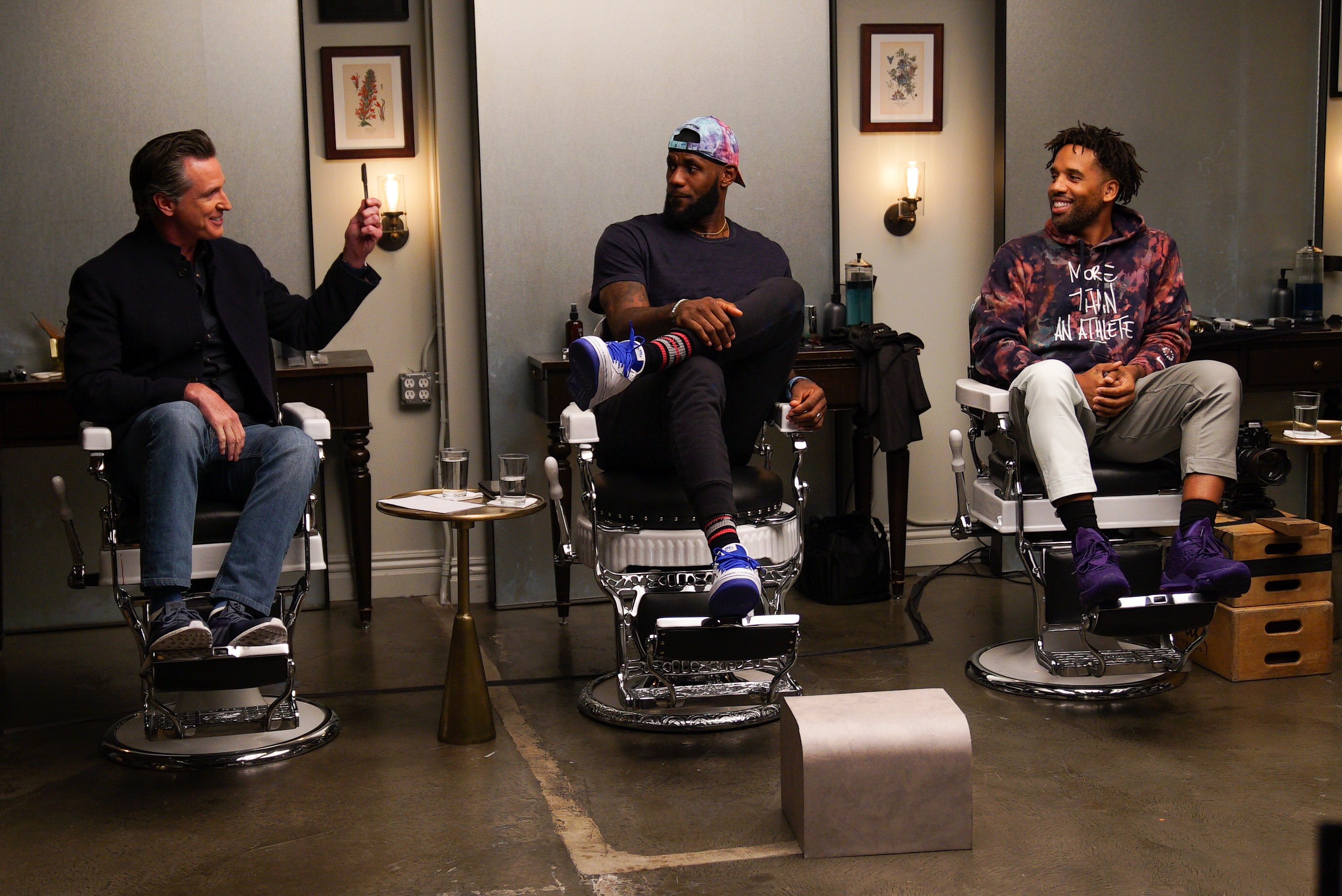
- Governor Gavin Newsom on The Shop with LeBron James and Maverick Carter in 2019
- Genre: Talk show
- Created by: Paul Rivera
- Starring: LeBron James; Maverick Carter
- Country of origin: United States
- Original language: English
- No. of seasons: 6
- No. of episodes: 30

Production
- Executive producers: LeBron James; Maverick Carter; Peter Nelson; Rick Bernstein
- Producers: Kevin McGrail; Brandon Riley; Rob Roediger
- Running time: 30 minutes
- Production company: Frehand

Original release
- Network: HBO (seasons 1–4); YouTube (season 5–8)
- Release: August 28, 2018 – November 6, 2025

The Shop: Uninterrupted, or simply The Shop, is an American television talk show created by Paul Rivera. It stars professional basketball star LeBron James and businessman Maverick Carter, who alongside guests have conversations and debates in a barbershop. The series premiered on HBO in the United States on August 28, 2018. On February 28, 2022, the series was renewed for a fifth season and moved to YouTube. In 2021, the series won a Sports Emmy for Outstanding Edited Sports Series.

== Production ==
=== Conception and development for Uninterrupted ===
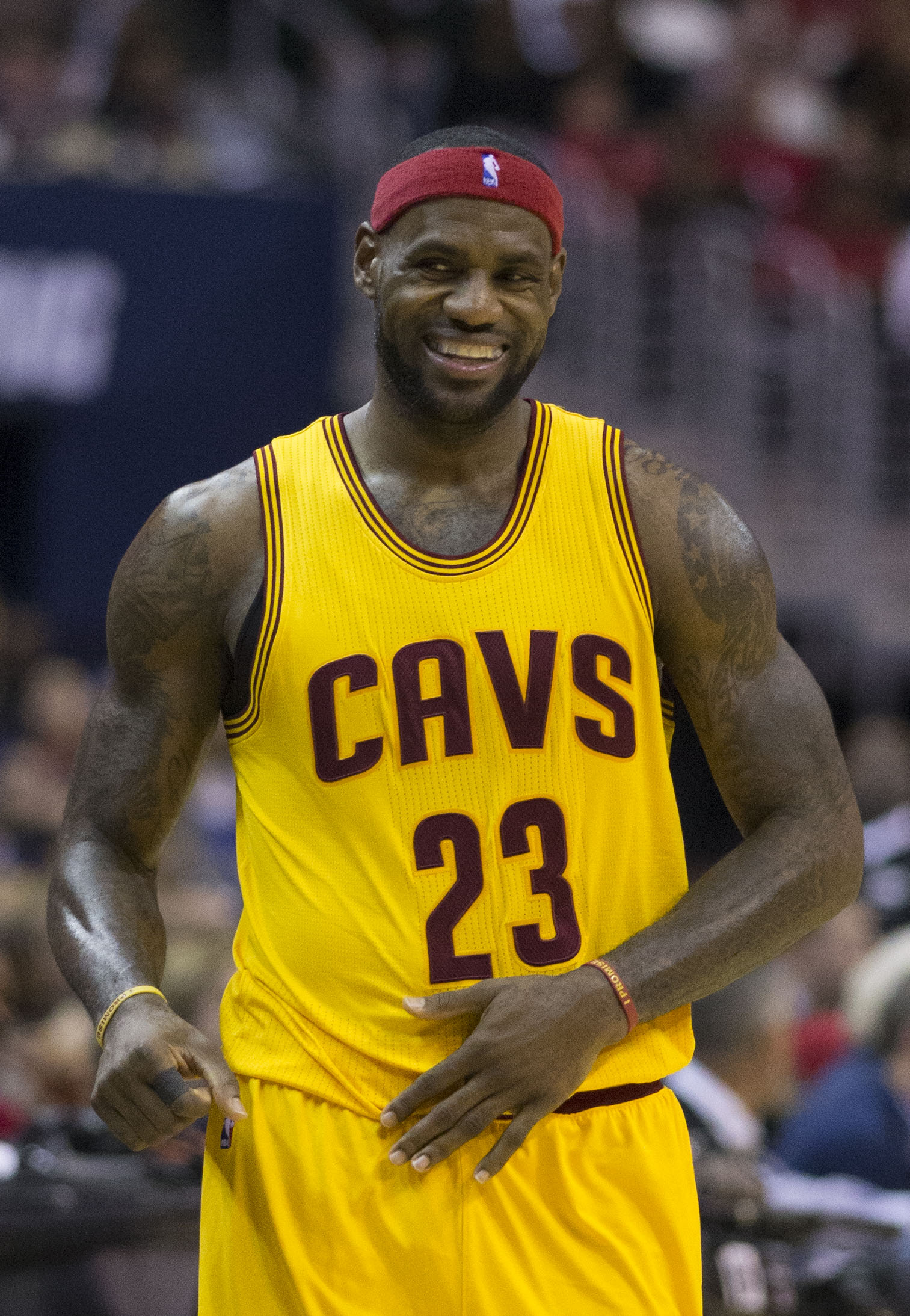
LeBron James in 2014

James spoke on how The Shop became an idea saying, "when I was a kid, being in barbershops meant listening to adults talk about sports, clothing, politics, music, everything happened in the shop. It was so real and so candid—no one had a sense of, well I can't be myself here." Randy Mims and Paul Rivera, both business partners of James' and Carter's, first proposed The Shop.

In February 2016, during the NBA's All-Star Weekend, the first iteration of The Shop was filmed in a Toronto-based barbershop for the Uninterrupted website. The following year, another episode of The Shop was filmed in a New Orleans–based barbershop. James and Carter were joined by Golden State Warriors power forward Draymond Green, Atlanta rapper 2 Chainz, Grey's Anatomy star Jesse Williams, former New York Knicks All-Star Charles Oakley, and businessman Steve Stoute. Stoute moderated the group's discussion, which notably generated James detailing how his mother did not want him to return to the Cleveland Cavaliers in 2014. The filming premiered on the Uninterrupted platform on June 9, 2017, coinciding with Game 4 of the NBA Finals between James' Cavaliers and Green's Warriors. The New Orleans episode was optioned by ESPN as a one-off.

=== HBO iteration ===
Following the New Orleans episode, talks with HBO began in earnest. HBO then ordered a handful of episodes of The Shop, with the episode order being left vague due to James' primary focus on his basketball career. The deal with HBO did not include airing the Toronto or New Orleans episodes; the first episode for HBO was filmed in West Hollywood's Barber Surgeons Guild, in July 2018. The episode guest starred New York Giants wide receiver Odell Beckham Jr., rapper Snoop Dogg, Los Angeles Sparks forward Candace Parker, comedian Jon Stewart, New Orleans Saints running back Alvin Kamara, and Green, alongside James and Carter. The episode premiered on HBO on August 28. Further episodes aired later throughout the year. The second episode was filmed in a Washington, D.C. hair salon, which houses a separate cuttery. This episode is notable for the guest appearance from rapper Drake, who spoke on the personal troubles between him and fellow musician Kanye West. Drake was honest and offered insight to the fight that normally would not have been made known. The third and fourth episodes were also filmed in Los Angeles, with the latter notable for wide receiver Antonio Brown publicly musing on his dissatisfaction with his role on the Pittsburgh Steelers, as well as with his heated relationship with quarterback Ben Roethlisberger.

The second season of The Shop premiered on March 1, 2019, with the premiere episode being filmed in Charlotte, North Carolina, during the NBA's 2019 All-Star Weekend.

The fourth season premiered on May 28, 2021.

== Episodes ==
=== Season 1 (2018) ===
No. overall	No. in season	Title	Original release date
1	1	"Episode 1"	August 28, 2018
Guests: Odell Beckham Jr., Michael Bennett, Jerrod Carmichael, Snoop Dogg, Draymond Green, Candace Parker, Vince Staples, and Jon Stewart.
2	2	"Episode 2"	October 12, 2018
Guests: Mo Bamba, Elena Delle Donne, Drake, Victor Oladipo, and Ben Simmons.
3	3	"Episode 3"	December 21, 2018
Guests: Mary J. Blige, Chris Bosh, Ice Cube, Todd Gurley, Jimmy Kimmel, Nas, and Lena Waithe.

=== Season 2 (2019–20) ===
No. overall	No. in season	Title	Original release date
4	1	"Episode 1"	March 1, 2019
Guests: Antonio Brown, Jerrod Carmichael, 2 Chainz, Anthony Davis, Jamie Foxx, and Meek Mill.
5	2	"Episode 2"	May 5, 2019
Guests: Lonzo Ball, Don Cheadle, DeAndre Hopkins, Jimmy Iovine, Seth Rogen, Travis Scott, and Pharrell Williams.
6	3	"Episode 3 (New York)"	September 3, 2019
Guests: Kevin Hart, Rob Gronkowski, Kevin Love, CJ McCollum, Charlamagne tha God, Lil Nas X, and Paul Rivera.
7	4	"Episode 4 (L.A.)"	October 25, 2019
Guests: Gavin Newsom, Jerrod Carmichael, Rick Rubin, Bill Hader, Sean Combs, Paul Rivera, DeMar DeRozan, Rich Paul, Ed O'Bannon, Katelyn Ohashi, Diana Taurasi
8	5	"Episode 5"	December 14, 2019
Guests: Will Smith, Martin Lawrence, CC Sabathia, Chance the Rapper
9	6	"Episode 6"	February 7, 2020
Guests: Megan Rapinoe, Whoopi Goldberg, Sue Bird, Stacey Abrams, Malcolm Jenkins, Hasan Minhaj

=== Season 3 (2020) ===
No. overall	No. in season	Title	Original release date
10	1	"Episode 1"	March 8, 2020
Guests: Patrick Mahomes, Chadwick Boseman, Trae Young, Roddy Ricch, Tiffany Haddish, Steve Stoute and Paul Rivera
11	2	"Episode 2"	October 30, 2020
Guests: Former President Barack Obama

=== Season 4 (2021) ===
No. overall	No. in season	Title	Original release date
12	1	"Episode 1"	May 28, 2021
Guests: Jay-Z, Nneka Ogwumike, Bad Bunny
13	2	"Episode 2"	June 25, 2021
Guests: Tom Brady, Kid Cudi, Chelsea Handler, Draymond Green
14	3	"Episode 3"	July 30, 2021
Guests: Maverick Carter, Trae Young, DJ Khaled, Meek Mill, Chase Young, Jemele Hill
15	4	"Episode 4"	August 27, 2021
Guests: Jason Sudeikis, Jack Harlow, Carmelo Anthony, Keegan-Michael Key, Liz Cambage
16	5	"Episode 5"	September 24, 2021
Guests: Naomi Osaka, Wanda Sykes, Kevin Love, Jadakiss
17	6	"Episode 6"	October 29, 2021
Guests: David Beckham, James Corden, Saweetie, Bubba Wallace, Yvonne Orji

=== Season 5 (2022) ===
No. overall	No. in season	Title	Original release date
18	1	"Episode 1"	March 4, 2022
Guests: Donald Glover, Quinta Brunson, J Balvin, Lamar Jackson; Hosts: LeBron James, Maverick Carter, Paul Rivera
19	2	"Episode 2"	April 4, 2022
Guests: Rick Ross, Gunna, A'ja Wilson, Steve Stoute; Hosts: LeBron James
20	3	"Episode 3"	May 6, 2022
Guests: Jake Paul, Amber Ruffin, Francis Ngannou, Romeo Santos; Hosts: Maverick Carter, Paul Rivera
21	4	"Episode 4"	June 10, 2022
Guests: Fat Joe, Amy Schumer, Don Lemon; Hosts: LeBron James, Maverick Carter, Paul Rivera
22	5	"Episode 5"	July 15, 2022
Guests: Daniel Kaluuya, Marcus Rashford, Rashid Johnson; Hosts: LeBron James, Maverick Carter, Paul Rivera
23	6	"Episode 6"	September 2, 2022
Guests: Kyrie Irving, Idris Elba, Drew Barrymore, Paul Rabil; Hosts: Maverick Carter, Paul Rivera
24	7	"Episode 7"	October 7, 2022
Guests: Lisa Leslie, Draymond Green, P.J. Tucker; Hosts: LeBron James, Maverick Carter, Paul Rivera
25	8	"Episode 8"	December 20, 2022
Guests: Tracee Ellis Ross, Anuel AA, Aldis Hodge; Hosts: Maverick Carter, Paul Rivera

=== Season 6 (2023) ===
No. overall	No. in season	Title	Original release date
26	1	"Episode 1"	March 9, 2023
Guests: Stefon Diggs, Ryan Garcia, Desi Banks
27	2	"Episode 2"	March 23, 2023
Guests: Rich Paul, Druski, Cordae, Steve Stoute
28	3	"Episode 3"	April 6, 2023
Guests: J.R. Smith, Chloe Bailey, Kenya Barris, Chiney Ogwumike
29	4	"Episode 4"	April 20, 2023
Guests: Teyana Taylor, Tabitha Brown, Babyface, Allyson Felix, Bobby Hundreds
30	5	"Episode 5"	May 4, 2023
Guests: Damson Idris, DaBaby, Hebru Brantley, Katelyn Ohashi
31	6	"Episode 6"	May 18, 2023
Guests: Devin Haney, Tee Grizzley, Amin Joseph, HaHa Davis
32	7	"Episode 7"	June 1, 2023
Guests: Wood Harris, J.B. Smoove, Shenseea, Dominique Fishback
33	8	"Episode 8"	June 15, 2023
Guests: Chris Paul, Ty Lue, LaKeith Stanfield, Killer Mike

=== Season 7 (2024) ===
No. overall	No. in season	Title	Original release date
34	1	"Episode 1"	March 7, 2024
Guests: Nelly, Becky Hammon, Cedric the Entertainer
35	2	"Episode 2"	March 28, 2024
Guests: Michael Rubin, Tiffany Haddish, Robert Kraft
36	3	"Episode 3"	April 18, 2024
Guests: LeBron James, Travis Scott, Sauce Gardner, Chad Johnson, Ice Spice, Julio Rodriguez
37	4	"Episode 4"	May 9, 2024
Guests: Mo Gilligan, LL Cool J, Teddy Swims, Lena Waithe, Trent Williams
38	5	"Episode 5"	May 30, 2024
Guests: Baron Davis, Calvin Johnson, Simu Liu, Tobe Nwigwe
39	6	"Episode 6"	June 13, 2024
Guests: MGK, Glorilla, Johnny Manziel, Alycia Baumgardner, Hit-Boy
40	7	"Episode 7"	July 11, 2024
Guests: Andre 3000, LeBron James, Sexyy Red, Jiaoying Summers, Nigel Sylvester
41	8	"Episode 8"	August 1, 2024
Guests: Brent Faiyaz, Sam Jay, Wiz Khalifa, Sean O'Malley, Sloane Stephens, Steve-O, Dana White

== Reception ==
Following the series' HBO premiere, Haley O'Shaughnessy of The Ringer wrote: "The setting creates a very personal facade, an opportunity to speak on fame and kids and race openly. The viewer is in on the conversation, but isn't in the conversation. Opinions on hot-topic issues that LeBron's addressed before aren't delivered like a sermon, which are more likely to fall flat. He's chatting with people he respects. And you feel like part of that group." O'Shaughnessy added that, "The Shop is another platform, but it isn't a pedestal. It's not a postgame press conference, where power dynamics are heavily skewed. It's an HBO show that attempts to keep a level playing field for everyone involved." Following the second episode, The Ringer's Micah Peters opined, "[The Shop is] really good TV––they sip wine, they offer a side of themselves rarely seen in public, and LeBron James says swear words. Even the color palette is spare and direct. This, like most barbershops, is a space reserved strictly for real talk." Rashad Grove of The Source wrote on the series' authenticity of the Black barbershop experience, "LeBron on The Shop is showing the world what really goes down at the Black barbershop. The conversations are raw and authentic over many glasses of wine."

Meredith Blake of the Los Angeles Times published a lukewarm review of the first episode, writing, "Though the effort to capture the vibrance and tell-it-like-it-is spirit of the African American barbershop met with slightly mixed results in the first episode, The Shop is more than worth a return visit," and adding "stylish black-and-white photographs of guests arriving at the shop serve as act breaks and enhance the show's documentary feel. But the choppy editing sometimes removes context from the conversation, offering little sense of how one subject flows to the next."

Billy Haisley of Deadspin wrote a more critical review of The Shop's first episode, questioning its candidness. Haisley referred to other outlets' comments on the episode, writing," Amazing: Slate, the Washington Post, and HBO all agree that an edited, literally filtered TV program created, produced, and starring a world-famous athlete with a notoriously and meticulously maintained image is best described as 'unfiltered.' The Ringer and the Sporting News at least consulted a thesaurus before copying The Shop's press release language, writing, respectfully, that the episode was 'honest' and 'candid.'" Haisley added, "The point here isn't that the things LeBron and Co. say in The Shop are insincere or fake or anything of the sort [...] Rather, the point is that the things said in The Shop are calculated, risk-free, decidedly filtered, stated for the predominant purpose of bolstering LeBron's brand. It's to position LeBron as a bold truth-teller without him having to actually tell any bold truths. And it should be treated as such." Carrie Battan of The New Yorker wrote positively of the show's candidness, however, commenting: "Theoretically, The Shop should have been yet another affirmation of our worst suspicions—that we would only ever get to see our superheroes in sanitized, strictly controlled ways. But James has offered a potent rebuttal to the argument that celebrities can't make interesting, revelatory content about themselves and their colleagues."

Battan wrote a positive review of The Shop, following its first season, as she opined positively on the series' setting "designed to generate the sense of candor, camaraderie, and intimacy that happens inside African-American barbershops." Battan conceded "[she does] not operate under the delusion that this show is a purely unfiltered, candid, and unprecedentedly revealing look at the assembled stars. There are plenty of platitudes and generalities being proffered here," but opined that The Shop "does exactly what the best celebrity profiles have always aspired to do: delight, surprise, inform."

Due to the series airing during James' basketball career, sports media outlets naturally covered The Shop, focusing on segments that dealt with James' presence in basketball. The ongoings of James' first season as a member of the Los Angeles Lakers lent themselves to discussion topics on the series, which led to further coverage by sports media. For example, Anthony Davis was the subject of rumors regarding an attempt to trade him to the Lakers at the time of his appearance on The Shop. The series also chronicled James' and fellow Lakers teammate Lonzo Ball's reactions to Magic Johnson stepping down from his Lakers front office role during the 2019 offseason; this was also noted by sports media outlets.
