= Maverick Carter =

American businessman and media personality (born 1981)

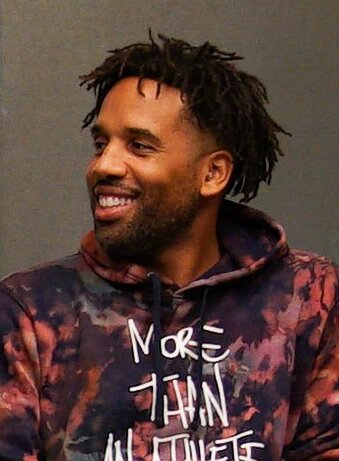
- Carter in 2019
- Born: October 10, 1981 (age 44); Ohio, U.S.
- Education: St. Vincent–St. Mary High School; Western Michigan University; University of Akron (dropped out)
- Occupations: Businessman; media personality
- Organization(s): SpringHill Company; Uninterrupted
- Known for: Business manager of LeBron James

Maverick Carter (born October 10, 1981) is an American sports marketing businessman and executive who is the chief executive officer (CEO) of SpringHill Company, Uninterrupted, and the Robot Company, all part of the holding company LRMR Ventures, which he co-founded with LeBron James.

== Early life and education ==
Maverick Carter was born on October 10, 1981. He spent most of his youth in Akron, Ohio, and Atlanta, Georgia. Carter grew up the son of Katherine Powers, a social worker, and Otis Carter. Carter and LeBron James became friends as children. Both played basketball and football at St. Vincent–St. Mary High School (SVSM) in Akron. He also played on the same team as Jay Williams at the Five Star Camp.

After graduating from SVSM, Carter played college basketball for one season at Western Michigan, averaging 2.0 points and 2.3 personal fouls per game in 2000-01, before transferring after his freshman year to the University of Akron. Carter attended Western Michigan University but left to intern in Nike's basketball sports marketing department.

== Career ==
Carter interned with Nike, withdrawing from college to become a Nike field representative. He later secured a full-time position at Nike before joining James as a business associate in 2004. He became the business manager of James in 2005.

In 2010, Carter managed the production of The Decision, a television special announcing James's move from the Cleveland Cavaliers to the Miami Heat. In 2011, he arranged a deal between LRMR and Fenway Sports Group that secured James a partial stake in Liverpool F.C. and bolstered his overseas profile. In the same year, he also developed The LeBrons series of commercials featuring caricatures of James.

In 2013, Carter founded SpringHill Entertainment, followed by the launch of Uninterrupted in the following year. In 2014, Carter, together with Paul Wachter, negotiated a Nike endorsement deal for James that was reported to be worth over $1 billion. Wachter also assisted in establishing partnerships with Cannondale and Beats Electronics, the latter of which reportedly generated more than $100 million in earnings for James following Apple Inc.'s acquisition of Beats in 2014. Later in 2014, Carter moved to Los Angeles and signed a production deal with Warner Bros. Entertainment. In 2015, Uninterrupted raised $23 million in funding from Warner Bros. Entertainment and Turner Sports.

In 2016, Carter donated $1 million to the National Museum of African American History and Culture in Washington, D.C.

In 2020, Carter co-founded SpringHill Company with LeBron James with an investment of $100 million. Named after the Akron apartment complex where James lived in sixth grade, the company consolidated three businesses: the Robot Co., SpringHill Entertainment, and Uninterrupted. Before its merger, SpringHill Entertainment completed at least 19 film and television projects, including a Netflix limited series about Madam C.J. Walker starring Octavia Spencer, the Disney XD series Becoming, the Starz series Survivor's Remorse, the NBC game show The Wall, the Bleacher Report spinoff Uninterrupted, and Space Jam: A New Legacy. Carter and James provided $1.3 million to the initial winners of their game show The Wall. Likewise, Uninterrupted worked with 250 professional athletes, including Serena Williams and Odell Beckham Jr.

In 2021, Carter parlayed a deal whereby he and James each gained part ownership stakes of the Boston Red Sox.

In 2022, Carter was an executive producer, alongside James and Drake, of Hubert Davis's documentary film Black Ice.

In 2023, he won the Children's and Family Emmy Award for Outstanding Young Teen Series at the 2nd Children's and Family Emmy Awards as executive producer on the Disney+ sports drama series The Crossover.
