= Angelyne =

American entertainer and model

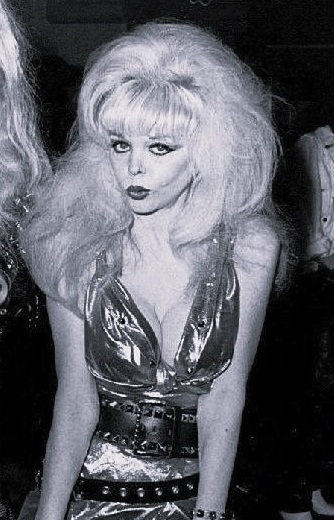
- Angelyne in 1985
- Born: Ronia Tamar Goldberg; October 2, 1950 (age 76); Chmielnik, Republic of Poland
- Other names: Renee Goldberg, Angelyne L'Lyne
- Citizenship: Poland, Israel, United States
- Occupations: Billboard model; singer; actress; businesswoman
- Years active: 1974–present
- Musical career
- Origin: Los Angeles, California, U.S.
- Genres: New wave; Dance-pop
- Instrument: Vocals
- Website: angelyne.com

Angelyne (born Ronia Tamar Goldberg, October 2, 1950) is an American singer, actress, media personality, and model. She came to prominence in 1984 after the appearance of a series of billboards in and around Los Angeles, California, printed with the word "Angelyne", and picturing her posed suggestively. These billboards caught the attention of local media outlets, and soon she received several offers for film roles, magazine interviews, and television show appearances. She was also noted for concealing her birth name, age, and identity, which did not become public knowledge until 2017.

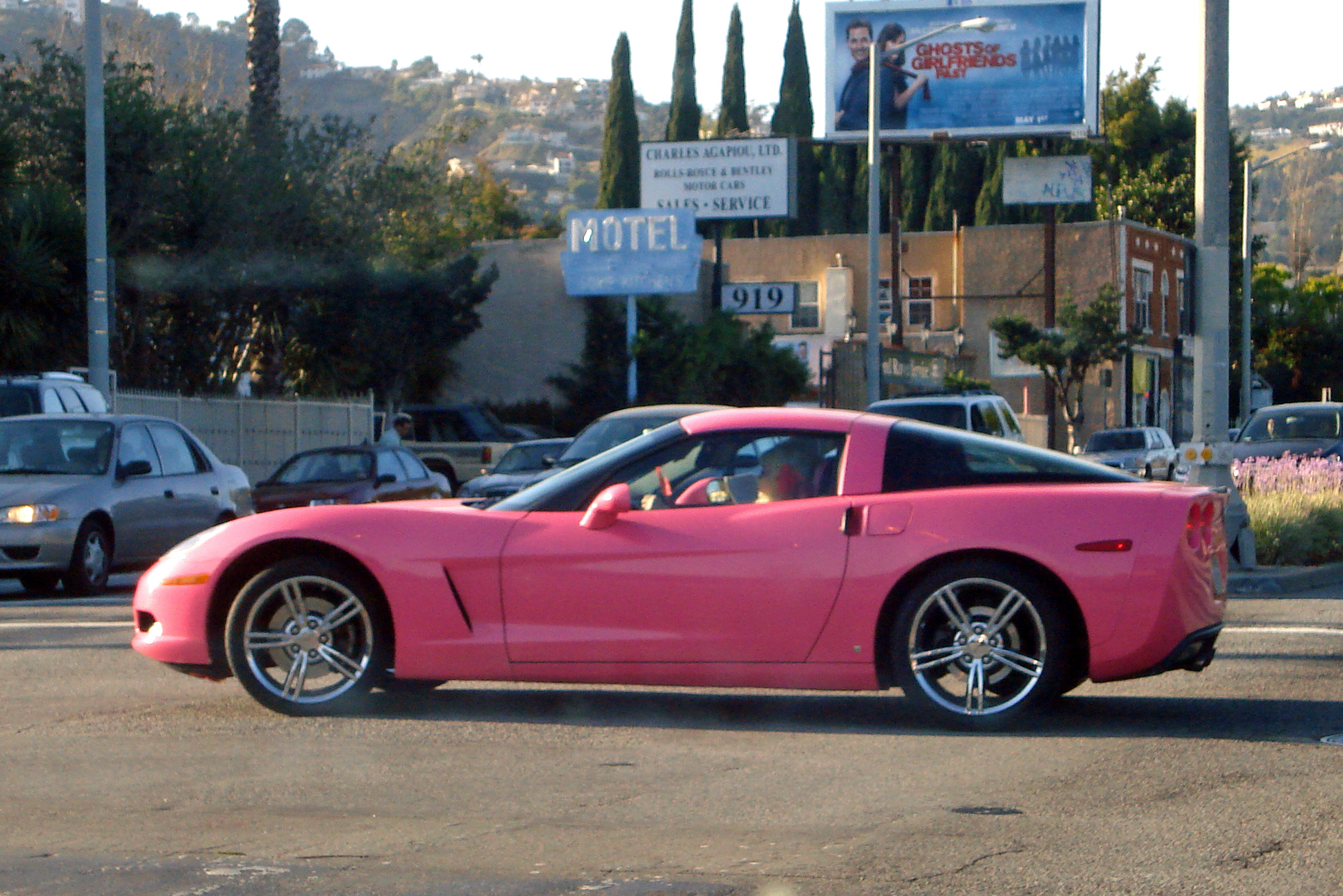
Angelyne's signature pink Corvette, an iconic part of her public persona.

In 1978, she joined her then-boyfriend's punk rock band Baby Blue, which performed in clubs around Los Angeles, but never became financially successful. In 1982, she released her self-titled debut album and her first posters began appearing as a part of the album's promotion. After the launch of a massive billboard campaign in February 1984, she began working on her second album. Driven to Fantasy was released in 1986. Angelyne then appeared in small parts in films such as Earth Girls Are Easy (1988), Dangerous Love (1988), and Homer and Eddie (1989).

Her billboards have been featured in a number of movies and television series, including the opening credits of Moonlighting and atop the building occupied by producer Harry Zimm (played by Gene Hackman in Get Shorty), and have been spoofed in shows such as The Simpsons, Futurama, and BoJack Horseman. Another distinctive feature of Angelyne's celebrity persona is her pink Corvette.

Angelyne is also a visual artist; she began painting in 1998 and has had several art shows in Los Angeles. She has run for Governor of California twice, during the recall elections of Gray Davis in 2003 and Gavin Newsom in 2021.

== Early life ==
Angelyne's previous names and origins became publicly known in a 2017 article by Gary Baum for The Hollywood Reporter. The article cited public records revealing that Angelyne was born in Poland as Ronia Tamar Goldberg to Holocaust survivors who were Polish Jewish. After being liberated from German Nazi concentration camps, including Skarżysko-Kamienna, Bergen-Belsen, and Buchenwald, her parents were married in the Föhrenwald DP camp, and then returned to post-war Poland. The family later settled in Bnei Brak, Israel, before immigrating to the United States in 1959. They moved to the Fairfax District of Los Angeles, where she went by the name Renee Tami Goldberg. Goldberg attended James Monroe High School and was married briefly to Michael Strauss in the late 1960s.

== Career ==
In 1978, Angelyne joined her then-boyfriend's band Baby Blue. They performed in local clubs in L.A. and once opened along with Rubber City Rebels for the Screamers' show at the Whisky a Go Go. The punk rock club The Masque served as a rehearsal place for the band. They released a single "Rock n' Roll Rebel" with a B-side, "Fantasy Man". Only 1,000 copies of the record were made and distributed in England.

The band did not receive much attention, so they decided to promote it by posting her picture around town. In 1979, the single "Too Much to Touch" was released under the name Angelyne, also promoted by posters and flyers.

In 1982, she released a self-titled debut album on an independent label, Erika Records. The 12" picture disc contained 11 songs, including two versions of "Sexy Stranger", a cover of Elvis Presley's hit "(Let Me Be Your) Teddy Bear", and the main single "Kiss Me L.A.". Another series of bus-shelter posters promoted the album. In July 1983, Erika Records released another Angelyne single, "My List", accompanied by a music video.

According to Angelyne, she met wealthy adhesive-free-tape entrepreneur Hugo Maisnik (inventor of Hugo's Amazing Tape) in 1982. Maisnik had a display-printing business in Los Angeles. Described as "very eccentric" and a "bored prankster", Maisnik reportedly saw potential in using Angelyne's image and understood the "intricacies of the outdoor-advertising game". In February 1984, Angelyne's first billboard proclaiming "Angelyne Rocks" went up on Sunset Boulevard.

In 1986, she released her second album, Driven to Fantasy, on her label, Pink Kitten. An enhanced pink vinyl reissue of the album was later released in Italy; in 2024, it was re-released on "Pink Corvette vinyl" by Dark Entries. In June 1987, an 85 feet high mural depicting Angelyne was painted on the side of a building on Hollywood and Vine. Her manager allegedly financed the $22,000 painting.

That same year, her friend Nina Hagen got her recording with Michael "Doc" Dosco, who had previously worked with Hagen on her album Nina Hagen in Ekstasy. He wrote and produced several songs for Angelyne, including "Animal Attraction," which was later featured in Julien Temple's movie Earth Girls Are Easy, where Angelyne had a cameo. The single was released in 1988 with remixes by Italian producer Pino Toma. Hagen mentioned Angelyne in her song "Super Freak Family," and her voice can be heard in "Pillow Talk".

By 1995, she had over 200 billboards up all over Los Angeles.

In 1997, Angelyne launched her website where she offered tours around Sunset Boulevard and Hollywood. In 1998, Angelyne pursued another artistic venture and began painting self-portraits. Since then she has had several successful art exhibitions.

In July 2013, Angelyne signed a contract with designer Michael Kuluva to be a face of a limited edition T-shirt for his clothing line Tumbler and Tipsy.

== Political career ==
Angelyne was a candidate for Hollywood city council in 2002, if it were to secede from Los Angeles. She ran for office again in 2003, this time for governor of California. Her slogan during the campaign was "We've had Gray, we've had Brown, now it's time for some blond and pink." Her mascot was a pink Maltese named Budda. She finished 29th in a field of 135 candidates, garnering 2,536 votes.

In April 2021, Angelyne announced plans to run in the 2021 California gubernatorial recall election of Gavin Newsom. She ran without a party preference. The 50% threshold to recall the incumbent governor was not reached. She received 0.5% of the vote and finished 18th out of 46, the highest candidate without a party preference.

== Portrayals in popular culture ==
In 1995, a black-and-white short documentary by Robinson Devor, Angelyne, was released.

The Angelyne Dream Experience, an experimental film by Dan Kapelovitz, who also worked on her EP Beauty & the Pink, was released in 1998. The short film with elements of psychedelia features Angelyne driving in the streets of Los Angeles, greeting her fans and talking about out-of-body experience.

Hugo Maisnik's daughter, Katherine Saltzberg, wrote and performed in the 2009 one-woman play Los Angelyne about her experience growing up in the shadow of the Angelyne billboards.

A miniseries based on the life of Angelyne, Angelyne, starring Emmy Rossum, created by Nancy Oliver, was ordered by Peacock in 2020. The series was executive produced by Sam Esmail and Angelyne. Production of the series was delayed due to the COVID-19 pandemic. The first trailer was released in April 2020. The series premiered on Peacock in May 2022.

== Discography ==
=== Albums ===
- Angelyne (1982)
- Driven to Fantasy (1986)
- Beware My Bad Boyfriend (Unreleased)
- Beauty & the Pink (2000)
- Hot Pink (2025)
- Billboard Queen (2025)

=== Compilations ===
- Eargasmmm (2019)

=== Spoken word ===
- Cosmic Gods (2018)

=== Singles ===
- "Rock n' Roll Rebel / Fantasy Man" (1978)
- "Too Much to Touch / Mystified" (1979)
- "Too Much to Touch / Emotional" (1981)
- "Kiss Me L.A." (1982)
- "My List / Skin Tight" (1983)
- "Flirt / Dreamin' About You" (1986)
- "Animal Attraction" (1988)
- "I'm So Lucky" (2003)
- "Heart" (2017)
- "Sexy Heart" (2017)

== Filmography ==
=== Films ===
- Phantom of the Paradise (1974)
- The Wild Party (1975)
- Can I Do It... 'Til I Need Glasses? (1977)
- The Frisco Kid (1979)
- Earth Girls Are Easy (1988)
- Dangerous Love (1988)
- Hardcase and Fist (1989)
- Homer and Eddie (1989)
- The Malibu Beach Vampires (1991)
- Get Shorty (1995)
- The Angelyne Dream Experience (1998)
- Wild Horses (1998)
- The Underground Comedy Movie (1999)
- Flies on Cupid (2000)
- King of Hollywood (2008)
- Place Like Home (2012)
- Running Wild (2013)
- The Disaster Artist (2017)

=== Television and documentaries ===
- Thicke of the Night (1983)
- The Tube (1985)
- Truth or Consequences (1987)
- Tommy's Hollywood Report (1987)
- Hot Seat (October 10, 1987)
- The Evening Magazine (July 1988)
- Up All Night (1991)
- Hollywood Women (1994)
- Angelyne (1995)
- Boulevard of Dreams (1996)
- Nina Hagen = Punk + Glory (1999)
- The Roseanne Show (March 22, 2000)
- Cleavage (2002)
- Alaska y Mario (2012)

=== Music videos ===
- "My List" (c. 1982) – Angelyne – Steve Lomas Productions
- "Jimmy Mack" (1985) – Sheena Easton
- "Right on Track" (1987) – Breakfast Club
- "I Can Take Care of Myself" (1987) – Billy Vera
- "City Life" (1988) – Tonio K
- "This Note's for You" (1989) – Neil Young
- "The I.N.C. Ride" (1995) – Masta Ace Incorporated
- "We Are All Made of Stars" (2002) – Moby
- "Pink Christmas" (2014) – Slink
- "Dionysus" (2015) – Mikhail Tank (featuring Angelyne as Aphrodite, the Goddess of Love)
- "Sunshine Sunshine Santa Claus" (2015) – Nikki & Candy
- "Mirror Mountain" (2015) – Mini Mansions
- "Give Up the Wheel" (2017) – Stray Echo
- "Cell" (2019) – Fukushima Daisies
- "Running Red Lights" (2020) – The Avalanches
- "Walk of Fame" (2022) – VR Sex

=== Billboard appearances ===
- Moonlighting (1986)
- Games of Survival (1989)
- The Jigsaw Murders (1989)
- Tax Season (1989)
- Another You (1991)
- Where the Day Takes You (1992)
- Jimmy Hollywood (1994)
- Get Shorty (1995)
- The Fan (1996)
- Volcano (1997)
- Rush Hour (1998)
- 8mm (1999)
- The Day After Tomorrow (2004)
- Notorious (2009)
- Rock of Ages (2012)
- Behind the Candelabra (2013)
- Terminator Genisys (2015)
