= Jotham (disambiguation) =

Jotham was a King of Judah in the Hebrew Bible.

Jotham or Yotam may also refer to:

== Given name ==
=== Jotham ===
- Jotham (son of Gideon), a character in the Hebrew Bible
- Jotham P. Allds, American politician
- Jotham Blanchard, Canadian politician
- Jotham Gay, Nova Scotian political figure
- Jotham Johnson, American archaeologist
- Jotham Meeker, American missionary
- Jotham Post, Jr., American politician
- Jotham Russell (born 2003), Australian American football player
- Jotham Tumwesigye, Ugandan judge

=== Yotam ===
- Yotam Ben Horin, Israeli musician
- Yotam Bugiangge
- Yotam Halperin (born 1984), Israeli basketball player
- Yotam Hanochi, Israeli-Portuguese basketball player
- Yotam Ottolenghi, Israeli chef and restaurant owner
- Yotam Solomon, Israeli fashion designer
- Yotam Tepper, Israeli archaeologist

== Surname ==
- Eustace Jotham, English soldier

== Other uses ==
- Jotham W. Wakeman Public School Number 6, school in New Jersey
