= Kuluva =

Kuluva is a surname. Notable people with the surname include:

- Michael Kuluva (born 1983), American fashion designer and founder of the New York fashion week label Tumbler and Tipsy
- Will Kuluva (1917–1990), American stage, film and TV actor
