= Tumbler and Tipsy =

Clothing brand

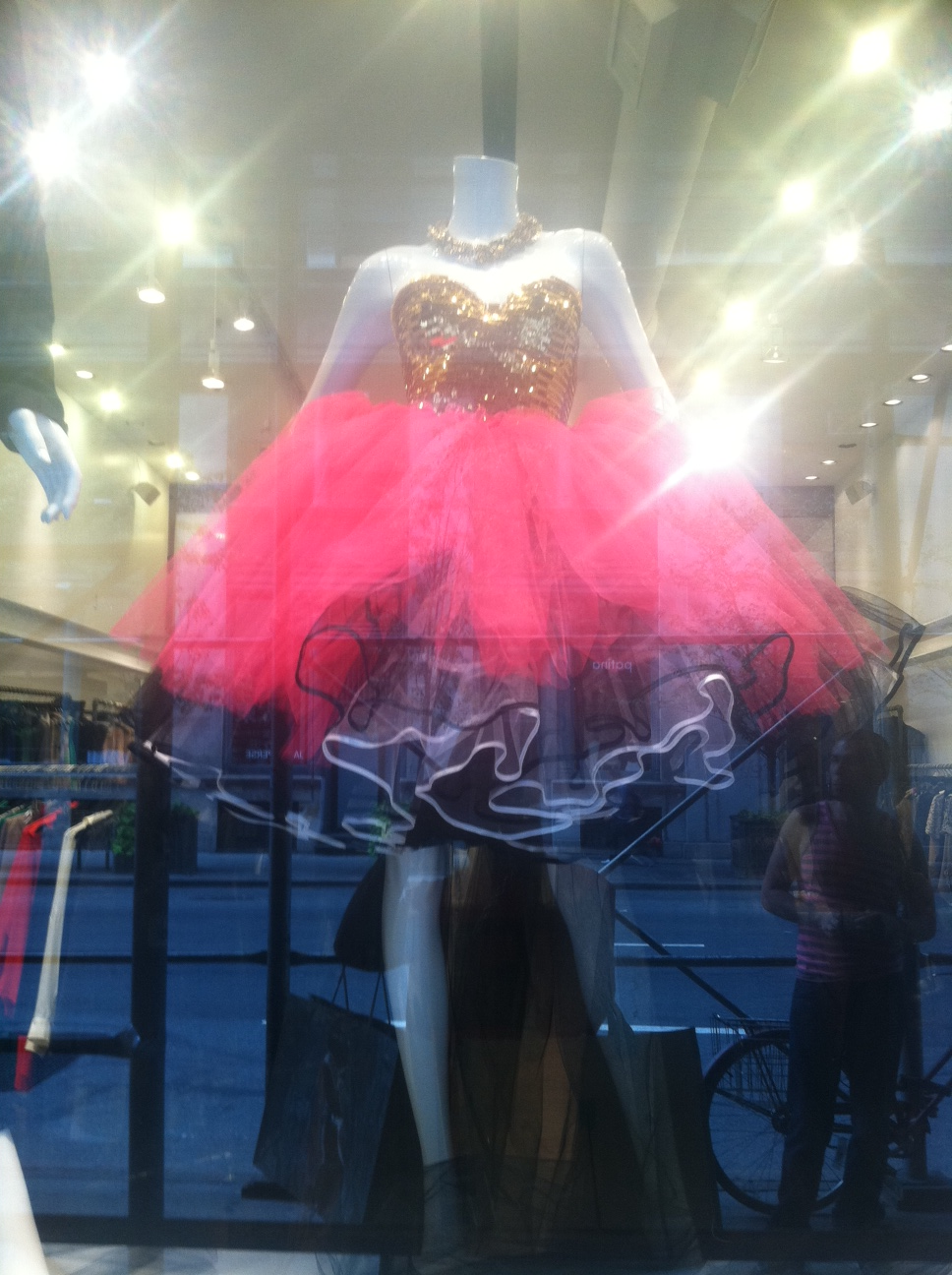
Tumbler and Tipsy by Michael Kuluva Dress in 3NY Store Window in 2012.

Tumbler and Tipsy is a brand of clothing and accessories founded by Michael Kuluva in 2009. Kuluva graduated from Fashion Institute of Design & Merchandising with a degree in fashion design in 2012. Tumbler and Tipsy by Michael Kuluva became the first fashion designer label to collaborate with a video game software company, Ubisoft to design high end garments for the New York Fashion Week Spring 2013 runway.

== New York Fashion Week ==
In September 2012, Tumbler and Tipsy by Michael Kuluva showed their Spring 2013 collection at New York Fashion Week. For Tumbler and Tipsy's debut fashion show in New York City, the label partnered with Ubisoft to design collaborative garments inspired by the video game Just Dance 4 that were then shown on the runway by celebrities such as Kendall Jenner and Olympic Gold Medalist Alex Morgan.

For Tumbler and Tipsy's sophomore New York Fashion Week show, Tumbler and Tipsy presented their Fall 2013 collection of plaid tweed garments which were inspired by the label's designer, Michael Kuluva for his take on the 1990s grunge movement while also staying true to the brands signature sequin look. Kuluva also maintained their outlook on today's Popular Culture by having Rick Genest "Zombie Boy" walk their runway alongside U.S. Figure Skating's three time senior men's national champion and 2010 Winter Olympics competitor, Johnny Weir. Kuluva developed partnerships with the Conair Corporation for their release of the "Infiniti by Conair" collection and with the luxury audio company Harman Kardon, as they released their new audio headphones during the New York Fashion Week show.

For the Tumbler and Tipsy Spring/Summer 2014 fashion season, Kuluva designed a collection entitled "So Next Level" which was inspired by today's popular fashion culture plus the future of "party themed" fashions. For the New York Fashion Week runway show, Neon Hitch opened the celebrity filled show with a live harpist on stage performing her hit single, "Love U Betta", while also wearing the collaborative "Out of the Closet Hanger Gown" designed for AIDS Healthcare Foundation who presented this seasons runway show. The Tumbler and Tipsy runway show continued with celebrity models coming down the infamous "T & T" catwalk such as Perez Hilton, Tarik Lakehal, Yasmine Petty and Johnny Weir. This season also had exclusive partners such as Swarovski Austrian Crystals, Caviar Frames and Flips Audio Headphones.

The Tumbler and Tipsy Spring/Summer 2015 "Pop Jungle" collection was first shown on the New York Fashion Week runway in the penthouse of "Top of the Garden" New York City, NY on September 8, 2014. The show featured a jungle themed collection with a seventies splash of tie-dye mixed with the pop culture of today, with the runway soundtrack produced by Cherrytree Records & Interscope Records featuring Kuluva's first solo pop music single entitled, "Do it non stop" plus having the global pop icon Amanda Lepore as the grand finale, this collection was a jungle party on the runway. Kuluva definitely put his signature stamp on pop fashion again this Spring/Summer 2015 season.

Tumbler and Tipsy by Michael Kuluva revealed their latest Spring/Summer 2016 "Champagne Wishes & Candy Dreams" Runway Collection presented by Kia Motors on September 16, 2015 at the Metropolitan West in New York City, NY. The S/S 2016 collection was candy inspired with having strategic collaborations with different candy manufacturers such as Jelly Belly and Pop Rocks plus the Tumbler and Tipsy brand officially debuted their own chocolate bar entitled, "The Glitter Bar", which is the world's first edible glitter chocolate candy bar. "The Glitter Bar" wrapper gown opened the runway show which was hand made with of over 100 Glitter Bar wrappers sewn together to form a bustier for the top of the pink, white and black tulle gown. The "Jelly Belly Couture" collaborative gown was worn by America's Next Top Model Cycle 22 contestant Ava Capra which had thousands of hand placed Jelly Belly beans attached onto the colorful hand made corset and also hand placed on the collaborative "Jelly Belly Couture" shoes which were paired with the signature "Tipsy Tutu". As for the Pop Rocks Candy gown collaboration, Kuluva hand sewed the Pop Rocks candy wrappers together to make two corseted gowns, one of which was worn down the runway by reality TV star Jill Zarin. Other notable reality TV stars such as Jonny Drubel, Ava Capra, Bello Sánchez and Hadassah Richardson made their way down the Tumbler and Tipsy runway. To encourage children to read more books, Tumbler and Tipsy partnered up with the iconic kids television show, Reading Rainbow this fashion season by creating a one of a kind Swarovski Crystal collaborative gown which was modeled by America's Next Top Model contestant Hadassah Richardson. Front row celebrities included Big Ang, Ally Shapiro, Bobby Zarin and Josh Canfield. This whimsical candy collection raises the artistic bar plus sets the newest trends for the world of pop fashion.

Kuluva's Spring/Summer 2017 "Creaky and Tipsy" collection at New York Fashion Week brought arthritis awareness while still staying true to Kuluva's iconic, fun-loving Tumbler and Tipsy brand. "I created very sporty, spandex-like material and garments that emphasize different bursts that would be on your elbows or different joints," Kuluva says. "When an outfit is completely worn, all the different joints light up with these bursts. You'll see exactly where our pain is; where we feel pressure. You can view it from the clothing." With this arthritis inspired collection being presented, Kuluva partnered with the non profit organization, CreakyJoints, to become public that he was diagnosed with Rheumatoid Arthritis at age 28. The spring/summer 2017 runway show featured Olympic gold medalist Dalilah Muhammad, Olympic silver medalist Nia Ali, Somaya Reece, Asaf Goren from "So You Think You Can Dance" and reality television star Teresa Giudice daughter Milania Guidice.

== Los Angeles Fashion Week ==
Kuluva started Tumbler and Tipsy while attending design school at FIDM. During Kuluva's last year at FIDM, Kuluva was asked to be a part of Los Angeles Fashion Week as an emerging designer presenting 12 looks to the critics. The select 12 looks were enough to bring the design label to forefront of the fashion scene and into boutiques worldwide. The Spring 2012 collection sold out worldwide making the label into a lifestyle brand with a fun party aesthetic.

The Tumbler and Tipsy brand was asked to present their Fall 2013 collection two more time's on the runway during Los Angeles Fashion Week, which were both received with rave reviews by industry critics and fans. The Los Angeles Fashion Week shows featured celebrity model Rick Genest "Zombie Boy" as the face of the label.

Tumbler and Tipsy also took to the runway two more times at Los Angeles Fashion Week showcasing the labels best looks of the Spring/Summer 2014 fashion season featuring reality television star Josie Stevens. Kuluva's designs quickly appeared in US Weekly, E! and Wet Paint and other publications.

The Tumbler and Tipsy Spring/Summer 2015 collection went from the New York runway directly to Los Angeles Fashion Week runway for a reprise of the "Jungle Pop" collection which featured celebrities such as actress Candis Cayne, NFL player Dale Moss plus reality TV star Asia Monet Ray for the debut of the children line "Tumbler and Tiny". The collection was another huge success on the other side of the USA with being named one of the "6 Top Sexiest Looks of Los Angeles Fashion Week" from fashion critics at LA Weekly.

For the Fall/Winter 2015 fashion season, Tumbler and Tipsy presented a capsule collected at Los Angeles Fashion Week entitled "Tres Tipsy" which was inspired from Kuluva's travels to Paris, France. Kuluva used his signature designs of the Tumbler and Tipsy brand and transformed them into a blue, white and red nostalgia which also included a celebrity finale "French Flag" gown worn by the former Pussycat Doll Kaya Jones.

== Television ==
On New Year's Eve of 2013, Tumbler and Tipsy by Michael Kuluva was featured on Dick Clark's New Year's Rockin' Eve show with both Flo Rida and Stayc Reign dressed in Tumbler and Tipsy. Shangela Laquifa Wadley was also dressed in Tumbler and Tipsy at the 2013 RuPaul's Drag Race Los Angeles Season 5 Premiere.

In 2015, Tumbler and Tipsy was featured on the final season of America's Next Top Model Cycle 22 during the "Go See" designer competition with the brand's Creative Director Michael Kuluva.

Michael Kuluva starred on Episode 7 of "Cholos Try" in 2016 which featured the Tumbler and Tipsy brand throughout the entire episode. The episode was televised and streamed online on the Mitu Network in July 2016.

Tumbler and Tipsy's next appearance was in February 2017 on Bravo TV series, First Family of Hip Hop featuring Somaya Reece walking the finale of the Tumbler and Tipsy Spring/Summer 2017 runway show at New York Fashion Week.

Michael Kuluva appeared on the finale episode of the Lifetime (TV network) docuseries, "Growing Up Supermodel" in 2018.

== Collaborations ==
Tumbler and Tipsy has collaborated with corporations, celebrities and design houses including Just Dance 4, Reading Rainbow, Jelly Belly, Pop Rocks, K-Way Jackets, Monster Cable Products, CreakyJoints, Conair Corporation, AIDS Healthcare Foundation, Out of the Closet, Angelyne, Lil Debbie, D.A.O Shoes, Cherrytree Records, Cliq Jewelry, Clac Belts and Harman Kardon.
