= Sierra Canyon School =

Prep school in Los Angeles, California, US

Coordinates: 34.2703°N 118.5861°W

Location
- 11052 Independence Avenue (lower campus); 20801 Rinaldi Street (upper campus); Chatsworth, Los Angeles, California; United States

Information
- Type: Private; Independent; day; college-preparatory school
- Motto: Latin: Excellentia propter se (Excellence is its own reward)
- Religious affiliation: Nonsectarian
- Established: 1978
- Founder: Mick Horwitz & Howard Wang
- Head of School: Stephanie Rubin
- Faculty: 170
- Grades: PK-12
- Gender: co-educational
- Enrollment: 1,100
- Average class size: 17
- Student to teacher ratio: 10:1
- Campus: Suburban, 37 acres
- Colors: Navy, Gray & White
- Athletics: 76 Athletic teams
- Athletics conference: CIF Southern Section; Mission League
- Nickname: Trailblazers
- Accreditation: California Association of Independent Schools; National Association of Independent Schools; Western Association of Schools and Colleges
- Newspaper: The Standard
- Tuition: $29,150–$48,600
- Website: sierracanyonschool.org

Sierra Canyon School (SCS) is a private, coeducational university-preparatory day school located in Los Angeles, California. Sierra Canyon enrolls students in preschool through grade 12.

Sierra Canyon School is accredited by the California Association of Independent Schools (CAIS). SCS is a member of National Association of Independent Schools (NAIS) and the Western Association of Schools and Colleges (WASC).

== History ==
Sierra Canyon School began in 1972 as the Sierra Canyon Day Camp, started by founders Mick Horwitz and Howard Wang. In 1978, the day camp became Sierra Canyon Elementary School. It began with 150 students, spanning Early Kindergarten through 6th grade.

In 1990, Sierra Canyon was the only school in Los Angeles, and the only private school in California, to be honored as a Recognized School of Excellence by the U.S. Department of Education. Founding directors Mick Horwitz and Howard Wang, and Principal Ann Gillinger received the Blue Ribbon Award of Excellence in Education from President George H. W. Bush at the White House.

By 2001, the school had grown to nearly 700 students from early kindergarten through 8th grade. An independent, non-sectarian, co-educational high school had not been built in the San Fernando Valley since 1961, during which time the Valley's population had grown by 60 percent. The need for a high school prompted the founders to appoint James P. Skrumbis as head of school in 2004 in order to expand and open an Upper School. The new Upper School opened in 2006, serving 7th through 12th grades. The upper and lower schools merged and incorporated as a non-profit organization for early kindergarten through 12th grade and established itself as a college preparatory private school. Sierra Canyon graduated its first senior class in June 2009.

== Educational program ==
Sierra Canyon School offers all students a fully UC-approved, comprehensive, four-year curriculum that includes honors and Advanced Placement courses.

== Athletic program ==
Sierra Canyon School participates in a full range of interscholastic athletics as a member of the CIF Southern Section (CIF–SS). Boys' teams include lacrosse, football, baseball, basketball, soccer, tennis, wrestling, cross country, track, golf, and swimming during the school year. Girls have the opportunity to compete in soccer, basketball, tennis, softball, beach volleyball, cross country, track, swimming, and volleyball.

In 2009, the girls' basketball team became the first to win a CIF–SS title in any sport for the school.

In 2015, the boys' and girls' basketball teams won California Interscholastic Federation (CIF) State championships. It was the first time in school history that both the boys' and girls' teams won a state basketball championship in the same year. The girls' basketball championship was their third consecutive state title.

In 2015, the girls' soccer team won the CIF Regional championships. The football team won the CIF–SS championship, and the following year, 2016, the Trailblazers won the CIF–SS championship, won the CIF State Southern California regional and won the CIF State championship, finishing the season with a 16-0 record.

In 2016, the Trailblazers won the CIF-SS Division 4 Championship in Football and won its first ever CIF-SS championship in girls' volleyball. During winter, the Trailblazers won their third ever CIF-SS soccer championship and second regional championship.

In 2016-2017, the Trailblazers won a school record eight league titles (football, girls' volleyball, boys' basketball, girls' soccer, lacrosse, golf, and softball).

In 2017, Sierra Canyon girls' volleyball team won the regional and state championships, the first state volleyball championship for the school.

In 2019, the boys' high school basketball team added Bronny James, son of NBA player LeBron James, later joined by five-star basketball recruit Ziaire Williams and Zaire Wade, son of NBA player Dwyane Wade.

The Sierra Canyon boys' basketball team held a media day on October 10, 2019 — one of few high school teams to do so. The media day attracted local and national news outlets. Since 2021 the basketball program has been the subject of the docuseries Uninterrupted's Top Class: The Life and Times of the Sierra Canyon Trailblazers, of which the first season on Amazon Freevee was nominated for Best Sports Show at the 4th Critics' Choice Real TV Awards.

== Campus ==
The campus contains more than 700 trees, lawns, flowers, and a horse trail on the lower campus which continues into Brown's Canyon. The lower campus includes a computer lab, a music room, and library. The upper campus includes a technology center, a media center for digital filmmaking, the black-box theater, and the Upper School Library. In the Spring of 2010, the student-designed Community Garden was added at the top of the campus.

== Notable alumni ==
- Maximo Adams (2026), basketball player for the North Carolina Tar Heels.
- Marcus Bagley (2020-transferred), basketball player in the NBA G League
- Marvin Bagley III (2017), NBA player, #2 Overall Pick in the 2018 NBA draft
- Amari Bailey (2022), former NBA player, currently playing professionally in the Israeli Basketball Premier League, 2021 California Mr. Basketball
- Ireland Baldwin (2013), model and daughter of actors Alec Baldwin and Kim Basinger
- Brandon Boston Jr. (2020), former NBA player, 2020 California Mr. Basketball
- Kennedy Burke (2015), WNBA player, 2024 WNBA Champion with the New York Liberty
- Cecilia Cassini (2017), fashion designer
- Vanessa de Jesus (2020), basketball player for the Duke Blue Devils, competes internationally for the Philippines
- Trentyn Flowers (2024-transferred), Former NBA player
- Corinne Foxx (2012), actress and daughter of Jamie Foxx
- Kwazi Gilmer (2024), college football wide receiver for the Nebraska Cornhuskers
- G Hannelius (2017), actress and singer
- DJ Harvey (2021), college football cornerback for the USC Trojans
- Parker Jackson-Cartwright (2014), basketball player who plays professionally in New Zealand
- Bronny James (2023), NBA player, son of LeBron James
- Bryce James (2025), Basketball player for the Arizona Wildcats, younger son of LeBron James
- Zoe Jarvis (2018), LOVB Pro Volleyball player
- Kendall Jenner (2014-transferred), socialite, reality television star, model, founder of 818 Tequila
- Kylie Jenner (2015-transferred), socialite, reality television star, founder and CEO of Kylie Cosmetics
- Christian Koloko (2019), NBA player
- Michael Kuluva (2001-transferred), Professional Figure Skater & Fashion Designer of Tumbler and Tipsy
- Kenyon Martin Jr. (2019), Former NBA player, son of Kenyon Martin
- Remy Martin (2017), basketball player who played professionally in Greece and Iceland
- Justin Pippen (2024), basketball player, younger son of Scottie Pippen and Larsa Pippen
- Scotty Pippen Jr. (2019), NBA player, son of Scottie Pippen and Larsa Pippen
- Kamari Ramsey (2022), NFL safety for the Houston Texans, former safety for the USC Trojans
- Cody Riley (2017), professional basketball player playing in Israel
- Jerzy Robinson (2026), college basketball player
- Willow Smith (2018), singer, actress and daughter of actors Jada and Will Smith
- Cassius Stanley (2019), former NBA player for the Indiana Pacers and Detroit Pistons NBA
- Derryck Thornton (2016-transferred), basketball player who played professionally in Serbia, Austria, and England
- Zaire Wade (2020), basketball player who played professionally in the NBA G League and South Africa, son of Dwyane Wade
- Duane Washington Jr. (2018), former NBA player
- JuJu Watkins (2023), basketball player for the USC Trojans
- Ziaire Williams (2020), NBA player, 2021 NBA draft #10 Overall Pick
