= Savannah James =

American businesswoman (born 1986)

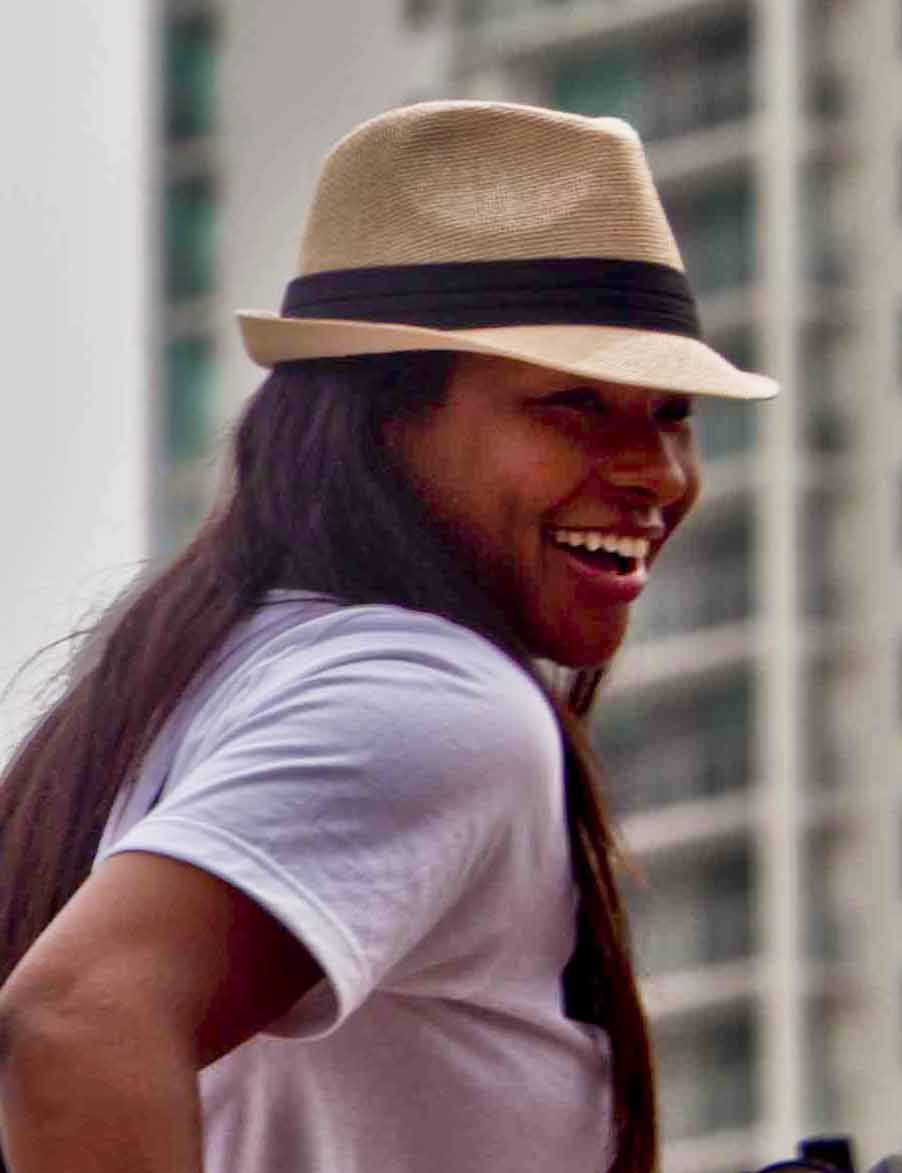
- James in 2012
- Born: Savannah Brinson; August 27, 1986 (age 40); Akron, Ohio, U.S.
- Occupation: Businesswoman
- Spouse: LeBron James (m. 2013)
- Children: 3, including Bronny and Bryce

Savannah James (née Brinson; born August 27, 1986) is an American businesswoman and philanthropist. She is the wife of basketball player LeBron James.

== Career ==
In 2016, James provided local Akron high school senior students with prom dresses. James also owned a juice store, The Juice Spot, in Brickell, Florida, but closed in 2016 due to moving back to Ohio. In 2010, LeBron and Savannah James released a children's bedroom furniture collection with American Signature called Home Court by LeBron James. She also founded a mentorship program called Women of Our Future.

James launched a podcast in April 2024 with co-host April McDaniel called Everybody's Crazy. In 2025, James partnered with Nick Axelrod-Welk to launch her skincare brand Reframe Beauty.

== Personal life ==
Brinson was born on August 27, 1986, in Akron, Ohio, the youngest of five children born to Jennifer Brinson and J. K. Brinson. She attended Buchtel Community Learning Center, where she played softball and was a cheerleader. During this time, she met LeBron James, who was a student at rival high school St. Vincent–St. Mary. The two first encountered each other at a football game and later began dating. Brinson was unaware of James' status as an elite basketball prospect at the time. James proposed to Brinson on December 31, 2011, during a party celebrating New Year's Eve and his 27th birthday. They married on September 14, 2013, in San Diego, California. Together, they have three children: Zhuri, Bryce, and LeBron Jr., a guard for the Los Angeles Lakers.
