= Tumwesigye =

Tumwesigye is a surname. Notable people with the surname include:

- Elioda Tumwesigye (born 1964), Ugandan politician
- Jotham Tumwesigye (born 1948), Ugandan lawyer and judge
