= Fashion Institute of Design and Merchandising =

Fashion school in Los Angeles, California

Coordinates: 34.0442°N 118.2598°W

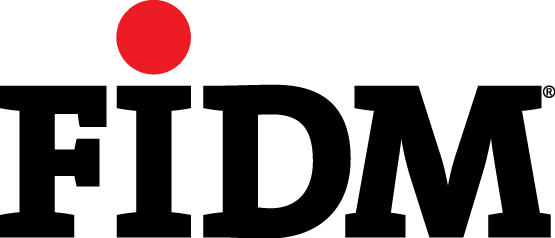
- Type: Private for-profit college
- Active: 1969–2025
- Location: Los Angeles, California, United States
- Website: fidm.edu

The Fashion Institute of Design and Merchandising (FIDM) was a private college founded in 1969 by Tonian Hohberg in downtown Los Angeles. In 2023, Arizona State University (ASU) announced that FIDM would become a part of ASU's fashion education program. The school officially closed on March 31, 2025 with its final graduating class.

== Academics ==
The college offered 26 associate degree programs; a Bachelor of Science degree in business management, which was also available via distance learning; and nine Bachelor of Arts degree programs. The college also offered a master's in business administration degree.

The college was accredited by the WASC Senior College and University Commission. Due to a commission review finding problems in sustainability and faculty oversight in 2019, status was changed from "Accredited" to "Accredited with Notice of Concern". It was also an accredited institutional member of the National Association of Schools of Art and Design (NASAD).

== Campuses ==
In addition to its Los Angeles campus, the college previously had three satellite campuses located in San Francisco, Orange County, and San Diego.

The main campus was the Los Angeles campus. The campus featured the modern architecture of Clive Wilkinson, innovative study spaces, a design studio, and the FIDM Museum and Galleries.

The San Francisco campus was located in Union Square. The Orange County Campus had lofts, an indoor/outdoor student lounge, bright colors, and a unique audiovisual igloo.

== In popular culture ==
FIDM served as the location of Lifetime's Project Runway season six, Project Runway: Under the Gunn, Project Runway: Threads, and Project Runway: Junior. Several FIDM alumni, including Santino Rice, Daniel Franco, Guadalupe Vidal, Kelli Martin, and Leann Marshall, were contestants on the original Project Runway show. FIDM was also featured in the MTV show The Hills, which shows the life of upcoming fashion designer, Lauren Conrad, who comes from Laguna Beach and wants to become famous for her designs.

== FIDM Museum ==
The Fashion Institute of Design & Merchandising Museum located at the Los Angeles Campus, was home to a large collection of fashion and costume pieces from the 1800s to today. The museum featured permanent and temporary exhibits, including costumes and designs from early 20th-century Hollywood, theater, and current television shows and films. The FIDM Museum Permanent Collection featured more than 15,000 objects representing over 200 years of fashion, spanning haute couture, ready-to-wear, international ensembles, film costumes, and fragrance. Highlights of the collection included the Lilli Ann, Michael Arnaud, Damask Cecil Beaton, Nancy Dinsmore, Rudi Gernreich, Stella Hanania, Helen Larson, Tina Leser, Maurice Levin, and Gianni Versace Menswear archives.

== Notable people ==
=== Alumni ===
- Princess Rajwa Al Hussein, Saudi architect and the wife of Hussein, Crown Prince of Jordan
- Marina Toybina, costume designer
- Lubov Azria, fashion designer
- Katie Bender Wynn, filmmaker
- Amanda Bynes, fashion designer, actress
- Lauren Conrad, author and fashion designer
- Cris Crotz, Miss Nevada 2010
- Candice Cuoco, fashion designer, Project Runway 14 finalist
- Kyra Davis, novelist
- Lil Debbie, rapper, model, and fashion designer
- Nikita Dragun, Beauty YouTuber
- Rhonda Harper, surfer and surf coach
- Mario Hollands, pitcher for the Philadelphia Phillies
- Sassa Jimenez, fashion designer, Philippines
- Karen Kane, fashion designer
- Lisa Kristine, fine art photographer
- Michael Kuluva, fashion designer, professional figure skater, owner of Tumbler and Tipsy
- Masiela Lusha, Albanian-American actress, poet, and humanitarian
- Leanne Marshall, fashion designer, Project Runway 5 winner
- Thai Nguyen, fashion designer and television personality
- Trish Summerville, costume designer
- Santino Rice, fashion designer, Project Runway 2 finalist
- Yotam Solomon, fashion designer
- Marlene Stewart, costume designer
- Edwin Bodney, poet
- Gottmik, drag performer, make-up artist
- Samantha Richelle, actress and fashion designer

=== Faculty and staff ===
- Kevin Reagan, graphic designer and author
- Bradford Shellhammer, entrepreneur and designer, founding editor of Queerty
- Nick Verreos, fashion designer

== See also ==
- Grand Hope Park
