= Driven to Fantasy =

1986 studio album by Angelyne

Studio album by Angelyne
- Released: 1986
- Recorded: 1985–86
- Genre: Dance-pop; rock; new wave
- Length: 30:23
- Label: Pink Kitten
- Producer: Angelyne; David Pasarow; Dale Carroll

Angelyne chronology
Angelyne (1982)	Driven to Fantasy (1986)	Beware of My Boyfriend (unreleased)

Singles from Driven to Fantasy
- 1. "My List" Released: June 1983; 2. "Flirt" Released: 1986

Driven to Fantasy is the second studio album by American singer and billboard model Angelyne, released in 1986 on her independent record label, Pink Kitten Records. It was her first musical release since her self-titled debut album (1982) and the rise to fame caused by her self-promoting billboard campaign, which made her a fixture on the Los Angeles scene. Produced by Angelyne and her guitarist David Pasarow, Driven to Fantasy is a dance-pop album with strong influences of new wave music. Angelyne collaborated with Pasarow and Dale Carroll on writing the songs for the album.

== Background and recording ==
Driven to Fantasy features four new songs, two dance mixes, and two previously released singles, "My List" and "Skin Tight", which were first issued in June 1983 by Erika Records.

In 1987, the album was reissued in Italy on pink vinyl with a different track listing. This edition included "Sexy Stranger", "Rock 'n' Roll Rebel", "Emotional", and "Kiss Me L.A.", songs previously recorded with Jordan Michaels.

== Cover and packaging ==
The album cover was shot by Larry L. Lombardi and depicts Angelyne leaning back on the hood of her pink Chevrolet Corvette. The same image was originally used on her first billboard on Sunset Boulevard in February 1984.

== Release and availability ==
The record was and remains available through the official Angelyne fan club.

In 2024, the album was re-released on "Pink Corvette vinyl" by Dark Entries.

== Track listing ==
Driven to Fantasy standard edition track listing
No.	Title	Writer(s)	Producer(s)	Length
1.	"Tangerine Rose"	Angelyne; David Pasarow	Angelyne; Pasarow	3:51
2.	"Sex Goddess"	Angelyne; Greg Carey	Angelyne; Pasarow	3:25
3.	"Dreamin About You"	Angelyne; Pasarow	Angelyne; Pasarow	3:25
4.	"My List"	Angelyne; Dale Carroll	Angelyne; Carroll	3:12
5.	"Skin Tight"	Angelyne; Carroll	Angelyne; Carroll	2:25
6.	"Flirt"	Angelyne; Pasarow	Angelyne; Pasarow	3:23
7.	"Sex Goddess" (Dance Mix)	Angelyne; Carey	Angelyne; Pasarow	5:37
8.	"Dreamin About You" (Dance Mix)	Angelyne; Pasarow	Angelyne; Pasarow	5:05
Total length:				30:23

1987 Italian edition
No.	Title	Writer(s)	Producer(s)	Length
7.	"Sexy Stranger"	Angelyne; Carroll	Jordan Michaels; Carroll	3:55
8.	"Rock 'n' Roll Rebel"	Angelyne; Michaels	Michaels	2:56
9.	"Emotional"	Angelyne; Michaels	Michaels	3:10
10.	"Kiss Me L.A."	Angelyne; Michaels	Michaels; Carroll	3:05
Total length:				32:47

== Credits and personnel ==
Performance

- Angelyne – vocals
- David Pasarow – guitar, bass
- Larry L. Lombardi – keyboards
- John Buxnor – keyboards
- Greg Carey – drums

Production

- Angelyne – producer
- David Pasarow – producer
- Dale Carroll – producer
- Ron McMaster – mastering

Design

- Larry L. Lombardi – photography
- Bill Wittman – artistic layout

Special thanks

- Hugo Maisnik
- Audrey Sherwood
- Nina Hagen
- Rodney Bingenheimer
