= Darnell Roy =

American rapper (born 1991)

- Born: Darnell Robinson; February 9, 1991 (age 35); Tenafly, New Jersey, U.S.
- Genres: Hip hop
- Occupations: Rapper; Record executive; Record producer
- Instrument: Vocals
- Years active: 2010–present

Darnell Robinson (born February 9, 1991) known professionally as Darnell Roy is an American rapper, record executive and record producer. He appeared in First Family of Hip Hop as the president of Sugar Hill Records.

== Early life ==
Roy was born in Tenafly, New Jersey, United States. He is the grandson of Sylvia Robinson, the founder of Sugarhill Records. In 2008, he enrolled at SAE Institute in Atlanta, Georgia, but left to pursue music.

== Career ==
Roy began recording songs as a child at the Sugarhill studio. In 2006, he appeared on MTV's My Super Sweet 16. In March 2010, he produced his first record, "Drip", with Young Joc featuring Lil Wayne. He later collaborated with the Young Money artists Lil Twist and Lil Chuckee. He went on to participate in the Scream Tour with Bow Wow, Omarion and Chris Brown. In 2016, he appeared in Bravo's docu-series First Family of Hip Hop. Following the show's debut, he released the song, "NASA". In January 2017, his single "Not So Low Key Ft. Velous" was released and in June the same year, he shared the track "Preserve" where he discusses his family's legacy in hip hop.

== Filmography ==
Television roles
Year	Title	Role	Notes
2006	My Super Sweet 16	Himself	Episode: "Darnell Robinson"
2016	First Family of Hip Hop	Himself	Lead role

== Discography ==
Title	Details
"Go Wild"	Released: May 2, 2012
"Promise"	Released: December 13, 2012
"Dividends"	Released: February 9, 2016
"NASA"	Released: October 10, 2016
"Not So Low Key" ft. Velous	Released: January 14, 2017
"Preserve"	Released: June 20, 2017
