= Karen Kane =

American fashion designer

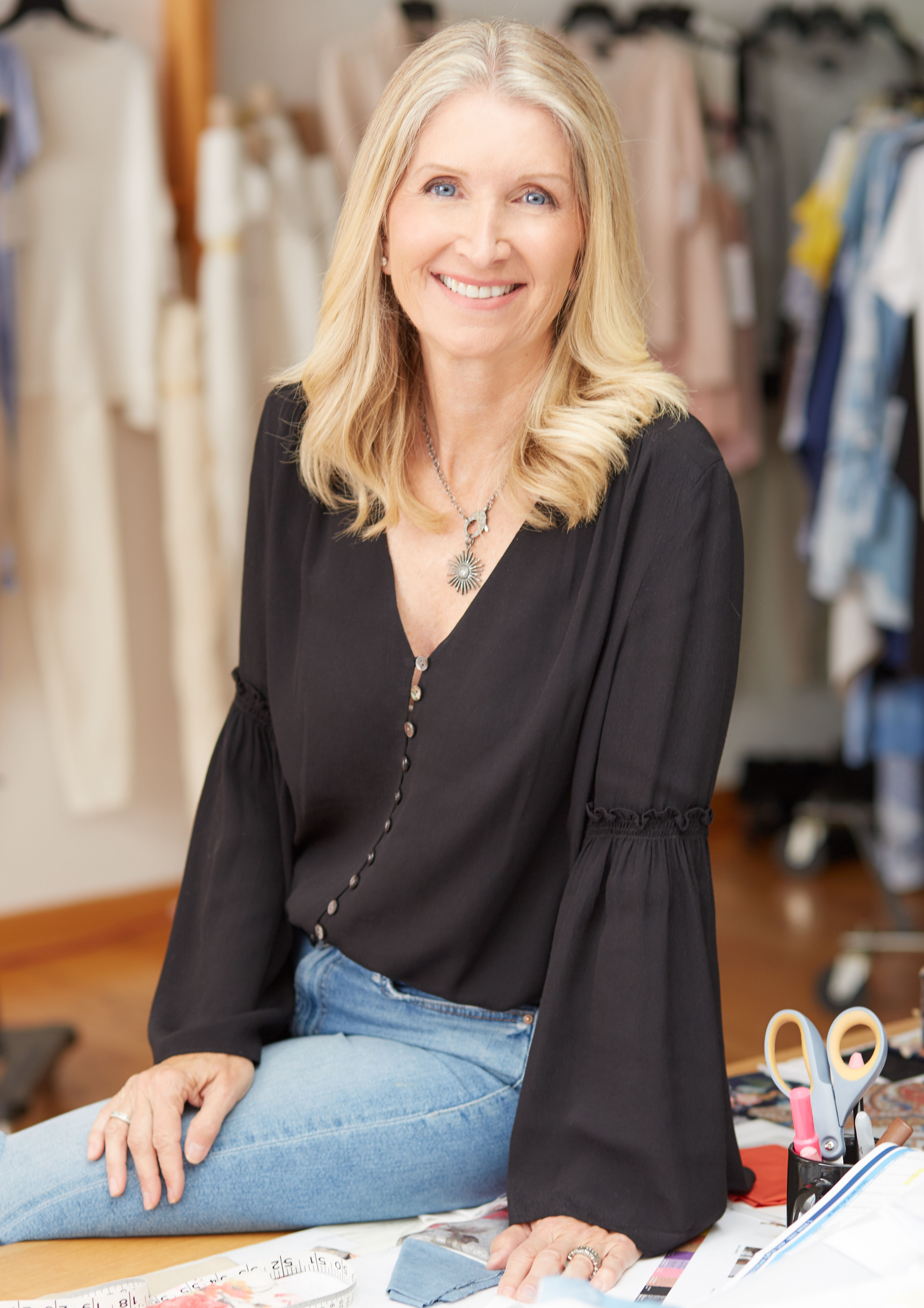
- Born: Barberton, Ohio, United States
- Education: Santa Barbara High School Fashion Institute of Design & Merchandising
- Occupation: Fashion designer
- Labels: Karen Kane; Robert Michaels; Karen by Karen Kane; Red 23; Fifteen Twenty
- Spouse: Lonnie Kane (since 1979)
- Children: Michael Kane; Robert Kane
- Awards: 2014 LA Business Journal Southern California Apparel Award Finalist; 2012 LA Business Journal Women Making a Difference Award Nominee; 2006 Dallas Fashion Award for Modernwear Designer of the Year; 1995 Fashion Industries Guild nomination for California Designer of the Year
- Website: http://www.karenkane.com

Karen Kane is an American fashion designer. Her designs are known for their relaxed, California-inspired feeling.

== Biography ==
Kane was born in the Akron suburb Barberton, Ohio, the youngest of three children. At the age of 9, her family moved from Ohio to Santa Barbara, California, where she grew up sewing and taking as many fashion-related classes as possible.

Karen Kane started her career in fashion when she graduated from the Fashion Institute of Design & Merchandising in Los Angeles at the age of 19. Her first job was as a pattern maker at a junior sportswear company. It was there that she met her husband and future business partner, Lonnie. In 1979, Karen and Lonnie married and launched the Karen Kane womenswear collection out of their Studio City garage. Initially, the brand was sold only at smaller specialty stores, but as the line expanded, it was picked up by department stores such as Bloomingdales, Nordstrom, Dillard's, Belk, and Von Maur, online retailers like Zappos, Gwynnie Bee, Lord & Taylor, Wolf & Badger, and large national specialty stores.

In 2012, Karen Kane was invited to the White House to attend US President Barack Obama's "Insourcing American Jobs" summit and later that year, US Trade Representative Demetrios Marantis toured Kane's headquarters in California to learn more about the challenges of domestically manufacturing apparel in the United States. In 2011, 80% of Kane’s line was made in the United States and 20% was imported from other countries. In Spring 2012, that percentage increased to 90%. As of Fall 2013, Kane continued to manufacture most of her collection in the United States (primarily in Southern California).

In 2008, Karen Kane launched Fifteen Twenty, a collection of assorted separates primarily made of silk. The brand has been worn by celebrities such as Reese Witherspoon, Jessica Biel, Carrie Underwood, Jessica Alba, Rosie Huntington-Whiteley, and others. In 2011, Kane introduced a casual complement to her Fifteen Twenty line entitled Red 23. “The line of T-shirts, tank tops, sweaters, jackets and scarves in neutral colors…will be carried by high-end specialty stores.” In 2015, Red 23 was absorbed into Fifteen Twenty to broaden the main brand into a larger collection. Today, Fifteen Twenty is a full collection of tops, jackets, dresses, skirts, and pants, and is sold in high-end specialty stores and online boutiques such as Nordstrom and Rent The Runway.

In 2013, Kane selected IMG (company) to represent the brand in developing licensed products.

During the COVID-19 pandemic, Kane's company temporarily shifted production from manufacturing clothing to making face covers for medical workers, nursing homes, first responders, and other at-risk individuals.

== Company ==
Kane's clothing is most well known for having an easy, relaxed style that is reflective of California. In 2020, Kane's company earned B Corporation (certification). Kane is privately owned and family operated.

In addition to sizes XS-XL, the brand also produces a plus size division of the lifestyle collection entitled Karen Kane Women’s, as well as petite sizes. In 2013, Kane added a sixth division to her company: Robert Michaels. Named for her two sons (Michael & Robert), the collection consists of knit dresses, tops, and sweaters, and is sold exclusively at Bloomingdale's.

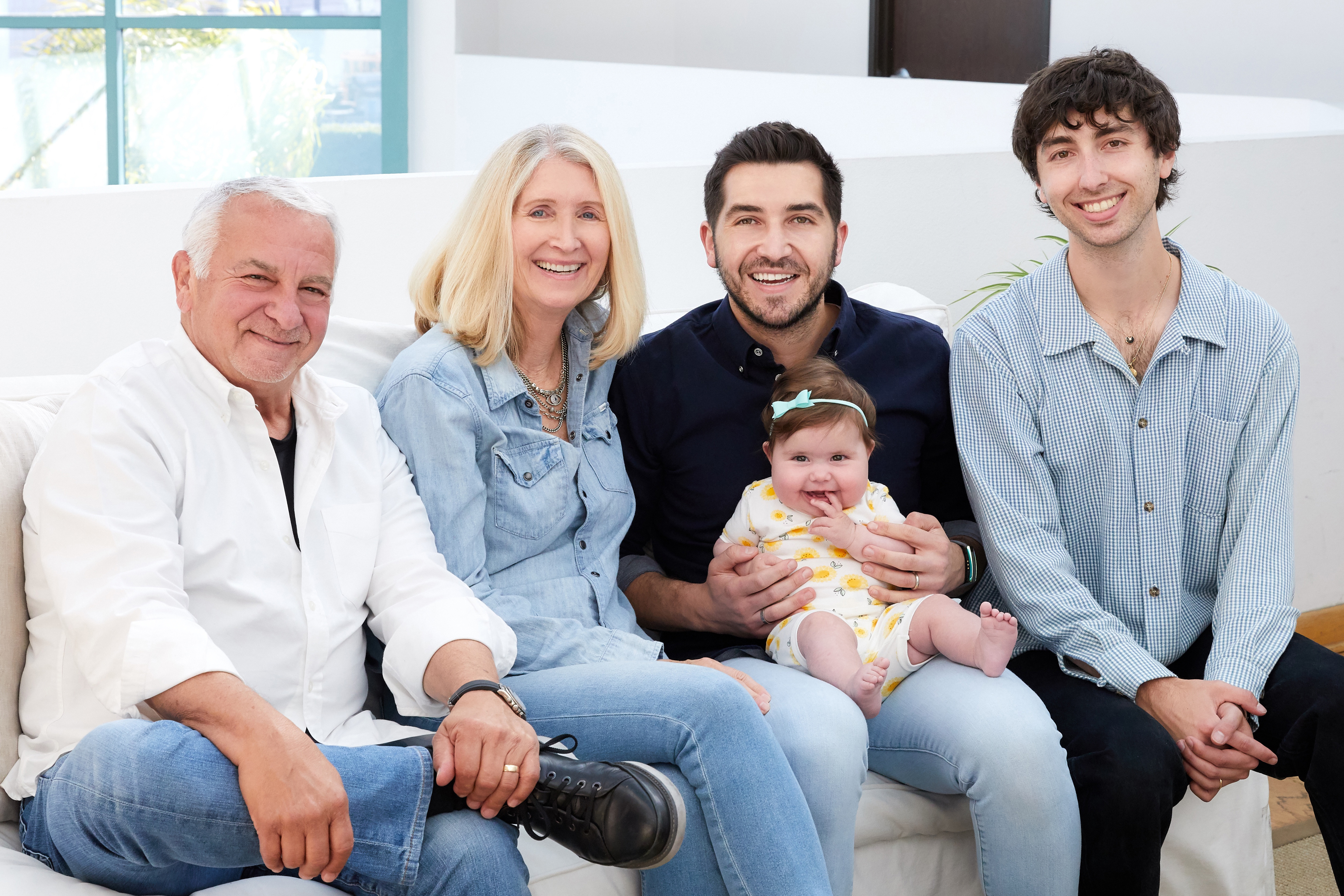
Karen Kane photographed with her family in her office, April 2021

Kane's husband, Lonnie, currently serves as the Chairman of the California Fashion Association. Since its inception, Kane's business has always been family-run. Her parents, Olga and Frank, were the company's first accounting and facilities employees. Lonnie's mother, Cecelia, worked in customer service and eventually handled employee benefits. Karen and Lonnie's older son, Michael, serves as the company's other co-president. Their younger son, Robert, designed a line of t-shirts that appeared in the 'Karen by Karen Kane' summer collection.

== Personal life ==
Karen Kane lives in Los Angeles with her husband, Lonnie, and runs her namesake clothing company out of Vernon, California.
