= Rhonda Harper =

American surfer

- Born: Kansas City, Missouri
- Education: Fashion Institute of Design and Merchandising
- Occupation: Surf coach
- Known for: Founder of Black Girls Surf

Rhonda Harper is an American surfer and surf coach and the founder of Black Girls Surf, a nonprofit organization that works to help young women of color to become professional surfers.

== Early life and education ==
Harper was born in Kansas City, Missouri. At age 10, her family moved to San Jose, California, providing Harper with her first exposure to the ocean. While at school, she was harassed due to her skin color, and had an alteration with other school kids who were dressed as members of the Ku Klux Klan. Her mother, afraid for her daughter, sent her to live with her sister on the North Shore of Hawaii. She joined the swim team in high school, but quit after being teased by the swim coach: "He always had something to say about Black bodies and Black people". While on the beach, she was invited to paddle out into the waves by a crewmember from Magnum, P.I., which was filming there at the time, introducing her to surfing.

When Harper was either 18 or 19, she recalls bringing her shortboard to a beach in Santa Cruz, California, and upon returning to her car, found a racial slur written on her windshield. She suffered another incident in San Diego and was driven away from surfing for a few years.

== Career ==
After graduating high school, Harper went to the Fashion Institute of Design and Merchandising. Harper worked with her brother making clothes, including celebrity clients Eddie Murphy and Heavy D. After Nick Gabaldón, a surfer of African-American and Latino descent, died at Ink Well Beach, Harper led the charge to have the city of Santa Monica install a commemorative plaque in his honor. Harper also did a brief stint in the Coast Guard.

In 2012, Harper was the managing editor for the Black Sports Network. While covering the Vans Triple Crown, she recalls realizing no Black surfers were in the competition. She enrolled to be a judge for the International Surfing Association with the goal of "learning what the judges were looking for and why certain surfers got more points than others. I wanted to figure out why more black surfers were not in the ISA."

In 2014, Harper founded the nonprofit organization Black Girls Surf to help young women of color become professional surfers. Black Girls Surf runs training camps from the beginner to professional level, and also raises funds for surfing equipment and transport to and from surfing competitions. In addition to the United States, Black Girls Surf maintains chapter across the world, including Senegal, Nigeria, Jamaica, Sierra Leone, and South Africa. Harper is a coach to Khadjou Sambe, the first female professional surfer from Dakar, the capital of Senegal.

In 2020, Harper traveled to Senegal to train with Sambe, but was unable to return for seventeen months due to travel restrictions imposed by the COVID-19 pandemic. Faced with the extended stay, a local surf school came up for sale, and she purchased it to start a new school: Black Girls Surf in Senegal. Harper has stated she wanted to "make sure that [the girls] were in a stable environment where they could grow and build on their surfing skills", targeting the Junior Olympics in 2026.

Through Black Girls Surf, Harper aims to empower African-American women surfers, recalling the lack of black representation in surfing when she was a child. In addition to her role as an advocate and coach, Harper also cites the need to "act as security" when her students are in the water. She states that she sees more than just territorialism and uses the phrase "surfing while black" to describe the aggression and harassment her students experience on the waves.
