= Michael Kuluva =

American fashion designer

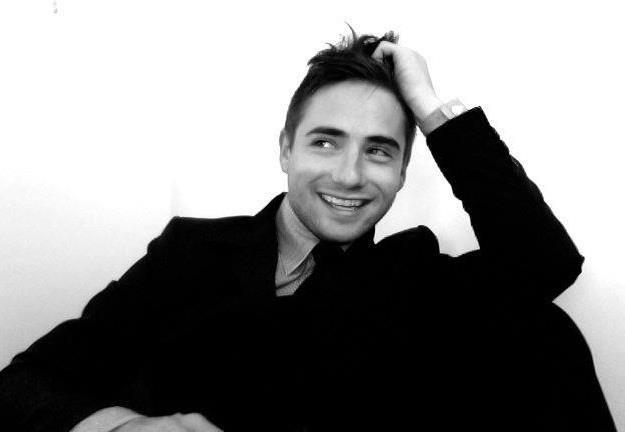
- Kuluva for Tumbler and Tipsy New York Fashion Week Elle Magazine 2012
- Born: Michael David Kuluva; May 6, 1983 (age 43); Missoula, Montana, U.S.
- Occupations: Fashion designer; figure skater; actor; TV personality; philanthropist
- Agent: Creative Artists Agency
- Labels: Tumbler and Tipsy; MICHAEL KULUVA
- Spouse: Russ Witherby (m. 2014; div. 2017)
- Relatives: Will Kuluva (cousin)
- Website: www.michaelkuluva.com

Michael David Kuluva (born May 6, 1983) is an American fashion designer and founder of the New York fashion week label Tumbler and Tipsy. He resides in Los Angeles, California. In 2012, Kuluva collaborated with a video game software company, Ubisoft to design high end garments for the New York Fashion Week Spring 2013 runway.

== Early life ==
Kuluva was born in Montana and raised in Los Angeles, California. His parents, Randy and Carol, are both attorneys in California. Kuluva had a passion for competitive figure skating which led him into the world of fashion. Kuluva attended Sierra Canyon School and graduated with honors from Montclair College Preparatory School in 2001. Kuluva forwent college after graduating high school at that time to pursue his professional figure skating career.

Kuluva's maternal grandfather is Roy Walter McClean of the Walt Disney Company. Roy W. McClean was the president of Retlaw Enterprises, also known as WDI and WED, Walt Disney's private company. McClean was employed with the Walt Disney Company from 1956 through 1988, when he retired. McClean died on April 7, 2005.

== Figure skating career ==
Kuluva competed in amateur U.S. Figure Skating, from 1989 through 2001, reaching the national and international level before moving into professional figure skating. Kuluva toured with Holiday On Ice as himself and Disney on Ice as the principal performer in their Disney/Pixar's The Incredible's in a Magic Kingdom Adventure production by portraying the main role of Dash Parr. Kuluva continued to portray the role of Dash Parr with Disney On Ice in 2005 for syndicated United States national television shows including Good Morning America, Live! with Kelly and Michael and The Today Show. Kuluva was also featured as himself in the Sony Motion Picture, "The Cutting Edge: Going for the Gold" in 2006.

== Fashion design career ==
Kuluva started designing in 2009 and retired from the sport of figure skating to begin schooling at the Fashion Institute of Design and Merchandising in Los Angeles. Kuluva started his fashion label Tumbler and Tipsy while attending FIDM and was asked to be a part of Los Angeles Fashion Week as an emerging designer. In September 2012, Kuluva graduated from FIDM with a degree in fashion design and presented his Spring 2013 collection at New York Fashion Week. For Kuluva's debut fashion show in New York City, he partnered with Ubisoft to design collaborative garments inspired by the video game Just Dance 4 that were then shown on the runway by celebrities such as Kendall Jenner and Olympic Gold Medalist Alex Morgan.

For Kuluva's sophomore New York Fashion Week show in February 2013, Kuluva presented his Fall 2013 collection of plaid tweed garments which were inspired by the 1990s grunge movement while also staying true to the brands signature sequin look. Kuluva also maintained his outlook on today's Popular Culture by having Rick Genest "Zombie Boy" walk his runway alongside U.S. Figure Skating's three time senior men's national champion and 2010 Winter Olympics competitor, Johnny Weir. Kuluva developed partnerships with the Conair Corporation for their release of the "Infiniti by Conair" collection and with the luxury audio company Harman Kardon, as they released their new audio headphones during the New York Fashion Week show. Kuluva was asked to present his Fall 2013 collection two more times on the runway during Los Angeles Fashion Week.

For the Tumbler and Tipsy Spring/Summer 2014 fashion season, Kuluva designed a collection entitled "So Next Level" which was inspired by then-popular fashion culture plus the future of "party themed" fashions. For the New York Fashion Week runway show, Neon Hitch opened the show with a live harpist on stage performing her single, "Love U Betta", while also wearing the collaborative "Out of the Closet Hanger Gown" designed for AIDS Healthcare Foundation who presented this seasons runway show. The Tumbler and Tipsy runway show continued with models coming down the "T & T" catwalk including Perez Hilton, Brielle Biermann, Yasmine Petty and Johnny Weir. This season also had exclusive partners including Swarovski Austrian Crystals, Caviar Frames and Flips Audio Headphones.

The partnership continued with Kuluva and the AIDS Healthcare Foundation, who also owns the Out of the Closet Thrift Stores, in which Kuluva participated in help opening their Brooklyn location with the "Donate & Style Contest". Another appearance in Los Angeles at their flagship store kicked off during Los Angeles Fashion Week for their "Donate & Style West Coast Contest" in which all proceeds went to the United States' largest AIDS healthcare non profit organization. Tumbler and Tipsy also took to the runway two more times at Los Angeles Fashion Week showcasing the labels best looks of the season plus featured reality television star Josie Stevens. Kuluva's designs appeared in US Weekly, E! and Wet Paint plus other publications.

The Tumbler and Tipsy Spring/Summer 2015 "Pop Jungle" collection was first shown on the New York Fashion Week runway in the penthouse of "Top of the Garden" New York City, NY on September 8, 2014. The show featured a jungle-themed collection with a seventies splash of tie-dye mixed with pop culture. With the runway soundtrack produced by Cherrytree Records & Interscope Records featuring Kuluva's first solo pop music single "Do it non stop" plus having singer Amanda Lepore as the grand finale, this collection was a jungle party on the runway. Following the New York runway, the "Pop Jungle" collection went to the Los Angeles Fashion Week runway for a reprise which featured actress Candis Cayne, NFL player Dale Moss and reality tv star Asia Monet Ray for the debut of the children line "Tumbler and Tiny". The collection was named one of the "6 Top Sexiest Looks of Los Angeles Fashion Week" by fashion critics at LA Weekly.

For the Fall/Winter 2015 fashion season, Tumbler and Tipsy presented a capsule collected entitled "Tres Tipsy" which was inspired from Kuluva's travels to Paris, France. Kuluva used his designs of the Tumbler and Tipsy brand and transformed them into a blue, white and red nostalgia which also included a finale "French Flag" gown worn by the former Pussycat Doll Kaya Jones.

Tumbler and Tipsy by Michael Kuluva showed their Spring/Summer 2016 "Champagne Wishes & Candy Dreams" Runway Collection presented by Kia Motors on September 16, 2015 at the Metropolitan West in New York City, NY. The S/S 2016 collection was candy inspired with having strategic collaborations with different candy manufacturers such as Jelly Belly and Pop Rocks plus the Tumbler and Tipsy brand officially debuted The Glitter Bar, an edible glitter chocolate candy bar.

"The Glitter Bar" wrapper gown opened the Tumbler and Tipsy Spring/Summer 2016 New York Fashion Week runway show which was hand made with of over 100 Glitter Bar wrappers sewn together to form a bustier for the top of the pink, white and black tulle gown. The "Jelly Belly Couture" collaborative gown was worn by America's Next Top Model Cycle 22 contestant Ava Capra which had thousands of hand-placed Jelly Belly beans attached onto the colorful hand made corset and also hand placed on the collaborative "Jelly Belly Couture" shoes which were paired with the signature "Tipsy Tutu". As for the Pop Rocks Candy gown collaboration, Kuluva hand sewed the Pop Rocks candy wrappers together to make two corseted gowns, one of which was worn down the runway by reality tv star Jill Zarin. Other reality TV stars such as Jonny Drubel, Ava Capra, Bello Sánchez and Hadassah Richardson made their way down the Tumbler and Tipsy runway. To encourage children to read more books, Tumbler and Tipsy partnered up with the iconic kids television show, Reading Rainbow this fashion season by creating a one of a kind Swarovski Crystal collaborative gown which was modeled by America's Next Top Model contestant Hadassah Richardson. Front row celebrities included Big Ang, Ally Shapiro, Bobby Zarin and Josh Canfield.

Kuluva's Spring/Summer 2017 "Creaky and Tipsy" collection at New York Fashion Week brought arthritis awareness while still staying true to Kuluva's iconic, fun-loving Tumbler and Tipsy brand. "I created very sporty, spandex-like material and garments that emphasize different bursts that would be on your elbows or different joints," Kuluva says. "When an outfit is completely worn, all the different joints light up with these bursts. You'll see exactly where our pain is; where we feel pressure. You can view it from the clothing." With this arthritis inspired collection being presented, Kuluva partnered with the non profit organization, CreakyJoints, to become public that he was diagnosed with Rheumatoid Arthritis at age 28. The spring/summer 2017 runway show featured Olympic gold medalist Dalilah Muhammad, Olympic silver medalist Nia Ali, Somaya Reece, Asaf Goren from "So You Think You Can Dance" and reality television star Teresa Giudice daughter Milania Guidice.

Kuluva's fashion designs and himself have been published internationally in Vogue Italia, Elle US September 2012, Women's Wear Daily Elle US December 2012, Elle US May 2013, Elle Japan September 2016 and Elle Thailand December 2016 issues.

In 2015, Kuluva made a guest appearance on America's Next Top Model Cycle 22 as the models compete for the "Go See" designer competition which included the Tumbler and Tipsy brand.

== Personal life ==
Kuluva began dating figure skater Russ Witherby in December 2012. The two were engaged in December 2013, and married on December 13, 2014, at the Ritz-Carlton in Rancho Mirage, California. Kuluva separated from Witherby in 2015 and the couple divorced in 2017.

== Filmography ==
Year	Title	Role	Notes
2017	Growing Up Supermodel	Himself	TV series
2017	First Family of Hip Hop	Himself	TV series
2016	Cholos Try	Himself	TV series
2015	America's Next Top Model	Himself	TV series
2014	Fashion News Live	Himself	TV series
2014	Beverly Hills Pawn	Himself	TV series
2013	Fashion News Live	Himself	TV series
2012	Entertainment Tonight	Himself	TV series
2012	Access Hollywood	Himself	TV series
2012	E! News	Himself	TV series
2012	Fashion News Live	Himself	TV series
2011	Deal or No Deal	Himself	TV series
2006	The Cutting Edge: Going for the Gold	Skater (Cameo)	Motion picture
2005	Good Morning America	Dash Parr	TV series
2005	The Today Show	Dash Parr	TV series
2005	Live with Regis and Kelly	Dash Parr	TV series
2005	The Daily Buzz	Dash Parr/Himself	TV series
