= Angelyne (album) =

1982 studio album by Angelyne

Studio album by Angelyne
- Released: 1982
- Recorded: Jennyfudy; Rudy Records, San Francisco, California
- Genre: Rock; new wave
- Length: 42:00
- Label: Erika
- Producer: Jordan Michaels; Dale Carroll; Leonard Johnson

Angelyne chronology
Angelyne (1982)	Driven to Fantasy (1986)

Singles from Angelyne
- 1. "Kiss Me L.A." Released: 1982

Angelyne is the debut studio album by American singer and billboard model Angelyne, released in 1982 by Erika Records as a limited edition picture disc. It was her first album under her own name following her tenure as the lead singer of the band Baby Blue. Angelyne is a rock album influenced by new wave music. She collaborated on the album with producers Jordan Michaels, Dale Carroll, and Leonard Johnson. The album features a cover of the Elvis Presley hit "(Let Me Be Your) Teddy Bear."

== Promotion ==
Flyers and posters were distributed around Los Angeles to promote the album. The campaign was initially organized by Angelyne's then-boyfriend, manager, and former Baby Blue bandmate, Jordan Michaels. In 1982, billboard print company owner Hugo Maisnik took over the campaign, expanding it by placing large billboards of Angelyne throughout the city. This widespread exposure contributed to her local fame and earned her the nickname "Billboard Queen of Los Angeles".

== Release and reception ==
The single "Kiss Me L.A." received moderate airplay on local radio. A track titled "Lee Ann Love" was reportedly planned for inclusion but did not appear on the final release. Musically, Angelyne has been compared to artists such as Berlin, Missing Persons, and Kim Wilde.

== Track listing ==
No.	Title	Writer(s)	Producer(s)	Length
1.	"Kiss Me L.A."	Jordan Michaels; Angelyne	Michaels; Dale Carroll	3:14
2.	"Sexy Stranger" (Long Version)	Carroll; Angelyne	Michaels; Carroll	7:35
3.	"I Want You"	Michaels	Michaels; Carroll	5:00
4.	"Blue High Heel Shoes"	Carroll	Michaels; Carroll	3:02
5.	"Draculove"	Michaels; Angelyne	Leonard Johnson	2:46
6.	"Teddy Bear"	Kal Mann; Bernie Lowe	Johnson	3:03
7.	"Still On My Mind"	Carroll	Michaels; Carroll	3:04
8.	"Only Love"	Michaels	Michaels; Carroll	5:04
9.	"Loony Bin"	Tom Schoenberger; Steve Mercer	Michaels; Carroll	2:34
10.	"Hearthrob"	Michaels; Angelyne	Michaels; Carroll	2:43
11.	"Sexy Stranger" (Short Version)	Carroll; Angelyne	Michaels; Carroll	3:55
Total length:				42:00

== Credits and personnel ==
- Angelyne – vocals
- Jordan Michaels – producer, guitar, arrangements
- Dale Carroll – producer, arrangements
- Leonard Johnson – producer
- David Dalessandro – drums
- Peter Christian – drums
- John Stanbridge – drums
- Susan Rogers – engineer
- John Banuelos – engineer

Credits adapted from the album's liner notes.
