= April Sargent =

American ice dancer

April L. Sargent (born April 1, 1968) is an American former ice dancer. Skating with Russ Witherby, she won the gold medal at the U.S. Figure Skating Championships in 1992 and competed in the Winter Olympics that year. She currently coaches at the Philadelphia Skating Club & Humane Society.

Sargent was born in Ogdensburg, New York, and was formerly an ISU technical specialist.

== Results ==
(with John D'Amelio)

Event	1983	1984	1985	1986
U.S. Championships	10th J.	2nd J.	10th	7th
J. = Junior level

(with Russ Witherby)

International
Event	1986–87	1987–88	1988–89	1989–90	1990–91	1991–92
Olympics						11th
Worlds		13th	WD	8th	9th	9th
Skate America				2nd		
Skate Canada			2nd			
Trophée de France				2nd		4th
NHK Trophy			3rd			
Nations Cup					2nd	3rd
National
U.S. Champ.	4th	3rd	2nd	2nd	2nd	1st
WD = Withdrew
