= Russ Witherby =

American figure skater

Russel S. Witherby (born February 3, 1962, in Cincinnati, Ohio) is an American coach and former competitive figure skater. He holds USFS Gold Medals in Dance & Free Dance, as well as International Dances. He competed in ice dance with several partners. Russ is the 1992 US Ice Dance Champion. He and April Sargent Thomas competed in the 1992 Winter Olympics. His other partners included Lois Luciani and Susie Wynne.

He is currently coaching at the Philadelphia Skating Club and Humane Society and Wissahickon Skating Club, where he is the Director of Figure Skating.

== Personal life ==
Witherby began dating fashion designer Michael Kuluva in December 2012. The two were engaged in December 2013, and married on December 13, 2014, at the Ritz-Carlton in Rancho Mirage, California. Witherby separated from Kuluva in 2015 and the couple divorced in 2017.

== Results ==
=== With Luciani ===
Event	1983	1984	1985	1986
U.S. Championships	9th	7th	4th	3rd

=== With Sargent ===
International
Event	1986–87	1987–88	1988–89	1989–90	1990–91	1991–92
Olympics						11th
Worlds		13th	WD	8th	9th	9th
Skate America				2nd		
Skate Canada			2nd			
Trophée de France				2nd		4th
NHK Trophy			3rd			
Nations Cup					2nd	3rd
National
U.S. Champ.	4th	3rd	2nd	2nd	2nd	1st
WD = Withdrew

=== With Wynne ===
International
Event	1992–1993	1993–1994
World Championships	15th	
Trophée de France		4th
Piruetten		4th
National
U.S. Championships	2nd	2nd
