= Bryce James =

American basketball player (born 2007)

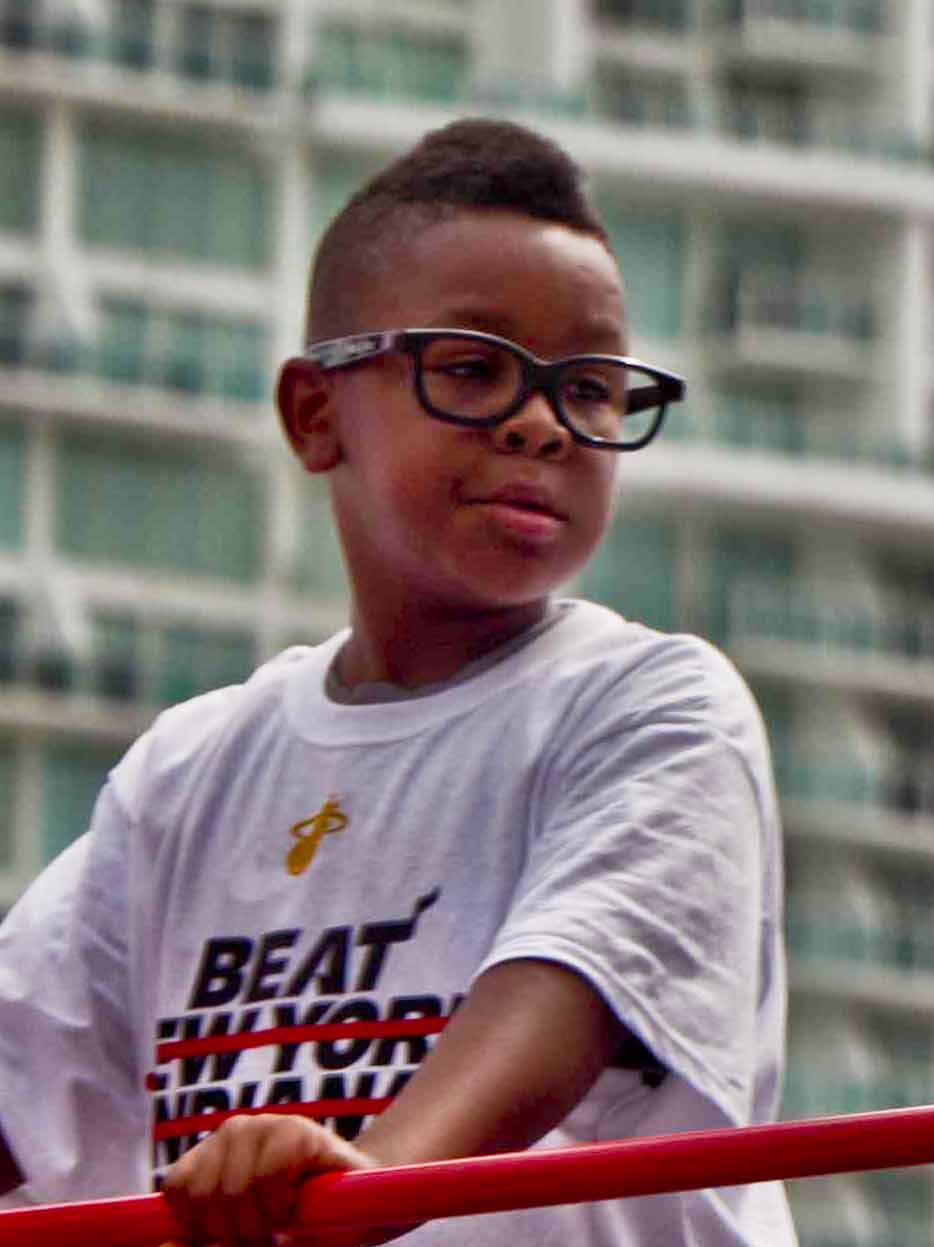
- James as a child in 2012

No. 6 – Arizona Wildcats
- Position: Shooting guard
- League: Big 12 Conference

Personal information
- Born: June 14, 2007 (age 19) Cuyahoga Falls, Ohio, U.S.
- Listed height: 6 ft 5 in (1.96 m)
- Listed weight: 195 lb (88 kg)

Career information
- High school: Sierra Canyon (Los Angeles, California)
- College: Arizona (2026−present)

Bryce Maximus James (born June 14, 2007) is an American college basketball player for the Arizona Wildcats of the Big 12 Conference. He is the second child of National Basketball Association (NBA) player LeBron James and businesswoman and philanthropist Savannah James. His older brother is NBA player Bronny James. He primarily plays the shooting guard position.

== Early life ==
James was born on June 14, 2007, in Cuyahoga Falls, Ohio, to LeBron James and Savannah James. His brother is fellow basketball player and guard for the Los Angeles Lakers, Bronny James. James attended Sierra Canyon School in Chatsworth, Los Angeles until he transferred to Campbell Hall School ahead of his junior year of high school. He stayed with Campbell only for a few summertime months, when on August 10, 2023, James announced he would be changing his transfer decision to Notre Dame High School in Sherman Oaks, California. On November 21, 2023, James transferred back to Sierra Canyon.

In December 2022, James signed a name-image-likeness contract with Klutch Sports.

== High school career ==
=== Recruiting ===
James was deciding between attending college at Ohio State, Duquesne or Arizona.

College recruiting
| Name | Hometown | School | Height | Weight | Commit date |
|---|---|---|---|---|---|
| Bryce James; SG / SF | Los Angeles, CA | Sierra Canyon (CA) | 6 ft 4 in (1.93 m) | 190 lb (86 kg) | Jan 1, 2025 |
| Bryce James; SG / SF | Recruit ratings: Rivals: 247Sports: ESPN: (79) | | | | |
Overall recruit ranking: Rivals: 220 247Sports: 284
Note: In many cases, Scout, Rivals, 247Sports, On3, and ESPN may conflict in their listings of height and weight.; In these cases, the average was taken. ESPN grades are on a 100-point scale.; Sources: "Arizona 2025 Basketball Commitments". Rivals.; "2025 Arizona Wildcats Recruiting Class". ESPN.; "2025 Team Ranking". Rivals.

== College career ==
On January 1, 2025, he announced his commitment to attend the University of Arizona to play college basketball for the Wildcats under Tommy Lloyd. On April 17, 2025, he officially signed with the Wildcats. James did not play in the 2025-2026 season, choosing to redshirt his freshman year.
