= Bronny James =

American basketball player (born 2004)

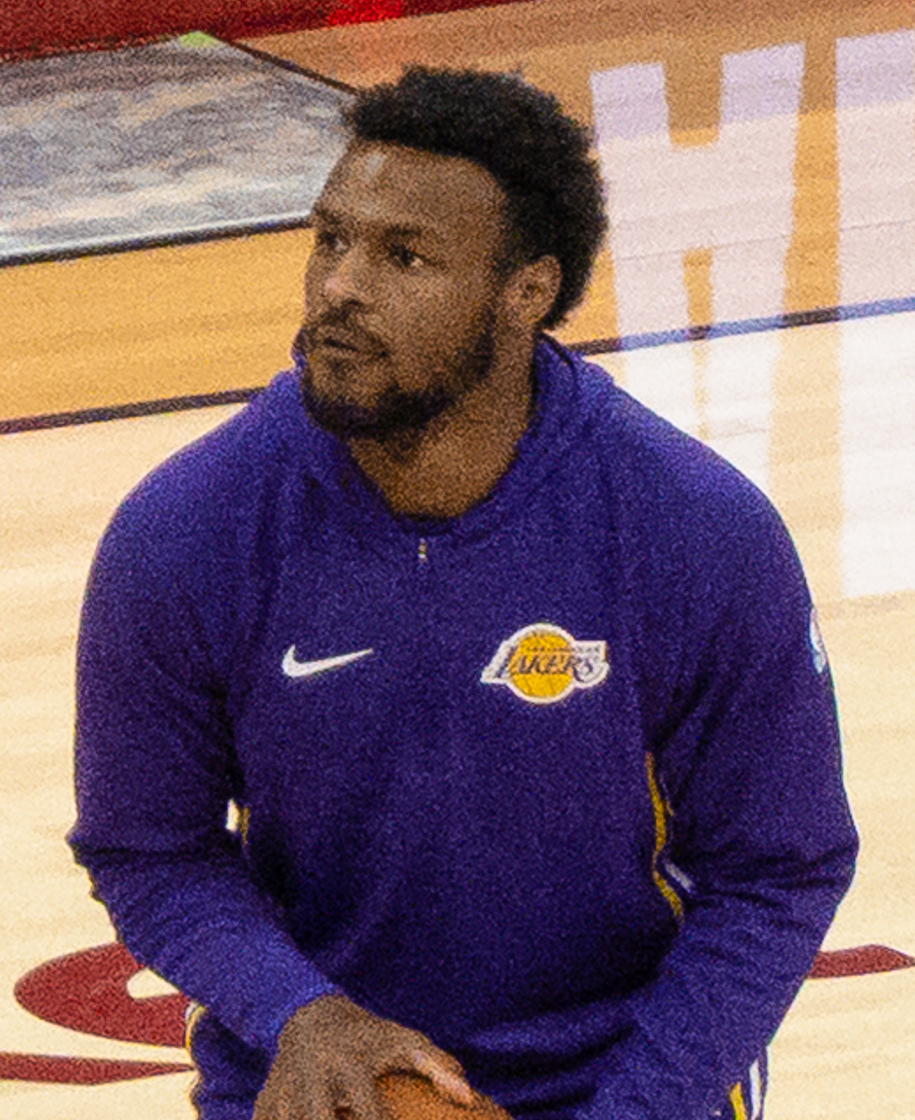
- James with the Los Angeles Lakers in 2026

No. 9 – Los Angeles Lakers
- Position: Point guard / shooting guard
- League: NBA

Personal information
- Born: October 6, 2004 (age 22) Akron, Ohio, U.S.
- Listed height: 6 ft 2 in (1.88 m)
- Listed weight: 210 lb (95 kg)

Career information
- High school: Sierra Canyon (Los Angeles, California)
- College: USC (2023–2024)
- NBA draft: 2024: 2nd round, 55th overall pick
- Drafted by: Los Angeles Lakers
- Playing career: 2024–present

Career history
- 2024–present: Los Angeles Lakers
- 2024–2026: →South Bay Lakers / Coachella Valley Lakers

Career highlights
- McDonald's All-American (2023)
- Stats at NBA.com
- Stats at Basketball Reference

LeBron Raymone "Bronny" James Jr. (born October 6, 2004) is an American professional basketball player for the Los Angeles Lakers of the National Basketball Association (NBA). A consensus four-star recruit, James was named a McDonald's All-American as a senior in high school in 2023. He played one season of college basketball for the USC Trojans before being selected by the Lakers in the second round of the 2024 NBA draft. He is the eldest child and former teammate of LeBron James Sr., making them the first active father–son duo in NBA history.

== Early life and career ==
James was born on October 6, 2004, in Akron, Ohio, to reigning NBA Rookie of the Year LeBron James, age 19, and his girlfriend Savannah Brinson, age 18. He was raised by both of his parents, who married in 2013. As a child, James played several sports including basketball and soccer, but his father did not allow him to play football or ice hockey because of safety concerns.

By the time James was 10 years old, his highlights from youth basketball games were drawing national attention. During his childhood, James played for the Miami City Ballers with teammates such as Jett Howard and the Houston-based Gulf Coast Blue Chips. In middle school, he competed for the North Coast Blue Chips, a team that included Mikey Williams. James also played for Old Trail School in Bath Township, Summit County, Ohio, where he attended middle school, and led his team to an Independent School League tournament win. In July 2018, a youth game featuring James was canceled after a fan wearing a Michael Jordan jersey heckled his father and was denied entrance. On August 6, 2018, he enrolled at Crossroads School, a private K–12 school in Santa Monica, California. California state rules prevented him from immediately joining the varsity team because he was in eighth grade. On December 3, 2018, in his first game for the school, James scored 27 points in a 61–48 victory over Culver City Middle School. In April 2019, he made his Nike Elite Youth Basketball League (EYBL) debut with Strive for Greatness.

== High school career ==
=== Freshman season ===
On May 29, 2019, James transferred to Sierra Canyon School, a private K–12 school in Chatsworth, Los Angeles, for his freshman year of high school. He joined the school with his brother Bryce and incoming senior Zaire Wade, son of Dwyane Wade, a longtime teammate of James’s father. Sierra Canyon's basketball program, under head coach Andre Chevalier, was one of the best in the nation and won the previous two California Interscholastic Federation (CIF) Open Division state titles. The 2019–20 team was led by five-star recruits Brandon Boston Jr. and Ziaire Williams, who transferred there for their senior years. Before the season, ESPN announced that its networks would air 15 of the team's games. Despite heavy media attention, James's father barred him from being interviewed.

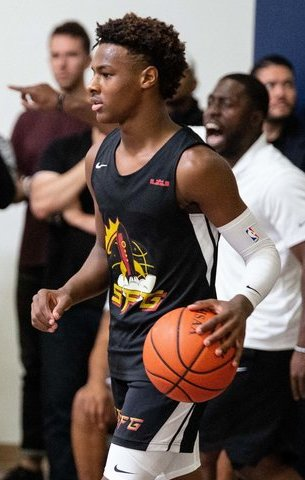
James with Strive for Greatness at the Nike EYBL in 2019

On November 21, 2019, James made his high school debut, scoring 10 points off the bench in a 91–44 win over Montgomery High School. On December 14, he scored 15 points, including a go-ahead layup, and was named the game's most valuable player (MVP) in a 59–56 victory over his father's alma mater, St. Vincent–St. Mary High School. On January 15, 2020, James scored a season-high 17 points in a 117–62 win over Viewpoint School. Five days later, during a Hoophall Classic game against Paul VI Catholic High School, a spectator threw an orange peel at James, briefly stopping play. A clip of the incident went viral, drawing criticism from James’s father, and the spectator apologized.

Sierra Canyon went 30–4 on the season and reached the Open Division state championship game, which was canceled due to the COVID-19 pandemic. As a freshman, James averaged 4.1 points and 15 minutes per game, and was the team's only player to appear in all 34 games.

=== Sophomore season ===
On November 12, 2020, James played his first preseason game as a sophomore for California Basketball Club (CBC), a travel team representing Sierra Canyon, against Air Nado, a team affiliated with Coronado High School, at the High School Showcase. He scored nine points, all in the first half. In February 2021, James tore his meniscus at practice and underwent surgery. Due to the COVID-19 pandemic, he had not played any official games for Sierra Canyon in the 2020–21 season, which was set to begin later that year. After missing most of the season, James returned against Centennial High School in the CIF Southern Section Open Division final on June 11. He scored seven points in an 80–72 loss. Sierra Canyon, led by junior Amari Bailey, finished the season with a 16–2 record.

=== Junior season ===
In James's junior season, his Sierra Canyon team was led by seniors Amari Bailey and Kijani Wright. On December 4, 2021, he scored a game-high 19 points in a 71–53 win over St. Vincent–St. Mary High School in the Chosen-1's Invitational at Staples Center, as Bailey was sidelined with an ankle injury. His team was upset by Harvard-Westlake School in the CIF Southern Section Open Division semifinals, where he scored four points.

Sierra Canyon reached the Open Division regional final, losing to Centennial High School, 83–59, and James was held scoreless while playing through hip soreness. The team ended the season with a 26–5 record. As a junior, James averaged 8.8 points, 3.3 rebounds, 2.8 assists and 1.9 steals per game in 29 appearances.

=== Senior season ===
In his senior season, James stepped into a leading role and was joined on the team by his younger brother, Bryce. In August 2022, he played alongside his Sierra Canyon teammates for CBC in three exhibition games in Europe. In his second game, James led all scorers with 25 points in a 97–85 loss to U18 French Select in Paris. On October 29, James and his team were evacuated from a preseason game against the Hyattsville Stags, a team representing DeMatha Catholic High School, after a fight broke out in the stands and a fan reported seeing a gun. Although no firearms were found, the game was not resumed.

After missing the first two regular season games with an illness, James made his senior debut on November 26, recording 13 points, four assists and three rebounds in a 63–60 overtime loss to Rancho Christian School. In his first home game on November 30, he scored 25 points in a 77–61 win over Crossroads School. In January 2023, James missed four games with a knee injury and scored 19 points in his return on February 1 as his team lost to Notre Dame High School, 88–61, at the Mission League semifinals. Sierra Canyon was relegated from the CIF Open Division to Division I after its worst performance in the regular season and Southern Section Open Division playoffs in the tenure of Andre Chevalier. James scored 10 points in an 80–68 season-ending loss to Notre Dame High School at the Division I regional final. As a senior, he averaged 14.2 points, 5.5 rebounds, 2.4 assists and 1.8 steals per game, leading his team to a 23–11 record. He was selected to play in the McDonald's All-American Game and was named to the United States team for the Nike Hoop Summit. James scored 15 points, making five three-pointers which tied the record for most made three-pointers in the event ever while dishing out 4 assists and 2 steals, in a 109–106 loss at the McDonald's All-American Game and finished second in the event's dunk contest. In the Nike Hoop Summit, he scored 11 points, 4 rebounds, a steal and a block as along with hitting the go ahead free-throws as his team won, 90–84.

=== Recruiting ===
By 2015, James was receiving scholarship offers and letters of interest from college basketball programs, according to his father, who commented, "It should be a violation. You shouldn't be recruiting 10-year-old kids." In 2016, ESPN reported that James held offers from Duke and Kentucky. Entering high school, analysts viewed him a high major NCAA Division I prospect. He first appeared in recruiting rankings before his sophomore season, and 247Sports and ESPN rated him a four-star recruit and a top-30 player in the 2023 class. Early in his junior season coming off a season ending injury, James fell to 52nd and 49th in rankings by 247Sports and ESPN, respectively, and he dropped 31 spots to number 60 in rankings by Rivals in June 2022. In his senior season, he rose in rankings from each service with On3 ranking James the 9th-best player in his class . On January 17, 2023, the Los Angeles Times reported that James would decide between attending college at Ohio State, Oregon or USC. On May 6, James announced his commitment to USC, with Ohio State being his other finalist.

College recruiting
Name	Hometown	School	Height	Weight	Commit date
Bronny James; PG / SG	Los Angeles, CA	Sierra Canyon (CA)	6 ft 3 in (1.91 m)	180 lb (82 kg)	May 6, 2023
Bronny James; PG / SG	Recruit ratings: Rivals: 247Sports: ESPN: (89)				
Overall recruit ranking: Rivals: 22 247Sports: 19 ESPN: 20
Note: In many cases, Scout, Rivals, 247Sports, On3, and ESPN may conflict in their listings of height and weight.; In these cases, the average was taken. ESPN grades are on a 100-point scale.; Sources: "USC 2023 Basketball Commitments". Rivals.; "2023 USC Trojans Recruiting Class". ESPN.; "2023 Team Ranking". Rivals.

== College career ==
In March 2023, James was projected as a top-ten pick in the 2024 NBA draft and, according to ESPN NBA draft analyst Jonathan Givony, was seen as the most improved prospect in the country. On July 24, 2023, James collapsed during a USC practice session at the Galen Center. It was later revealed that he had suffered cardiac arrest caused by a congenital heart defect. James was released from the hospital on July 27.

Less than five months later, James made his collegiate debut for the Trojans on December 10, finishing with four points, three rebounds, two assists, two steals, and one block off the bench in an 84–79 loss against Long Beach State. On December 30, James scored a career-high 15 points on 6-of-11 from the field and had three assists in a road loss against Oregon State. On January 17, 2024, James played a season-high 30 minutes and recorded 11 points, five rebounds and six assists in an 82–67 loss to No. 12 Arizona. James appeared in USC's final 25 games, starting six and averaging 4.8 points, 2.8 rebounds and 2.1 assists in 19.3 minutes. On April 5, 2024, James announced on Instagram that he would enter the 2024 NBA draft while maintaining his college eligibility and also enter the transfer portal. In early May 2024, James was medically cleared to be eligible for the NBA draft. On May 28, 2024, it was reported that James had at least 10 workout invites from NBA teams but only visited a "couple" of those teams, which included the Los Angeles Lakers and Phoenix Suns. He later had workouts with only those two teams.

== Professional career ==
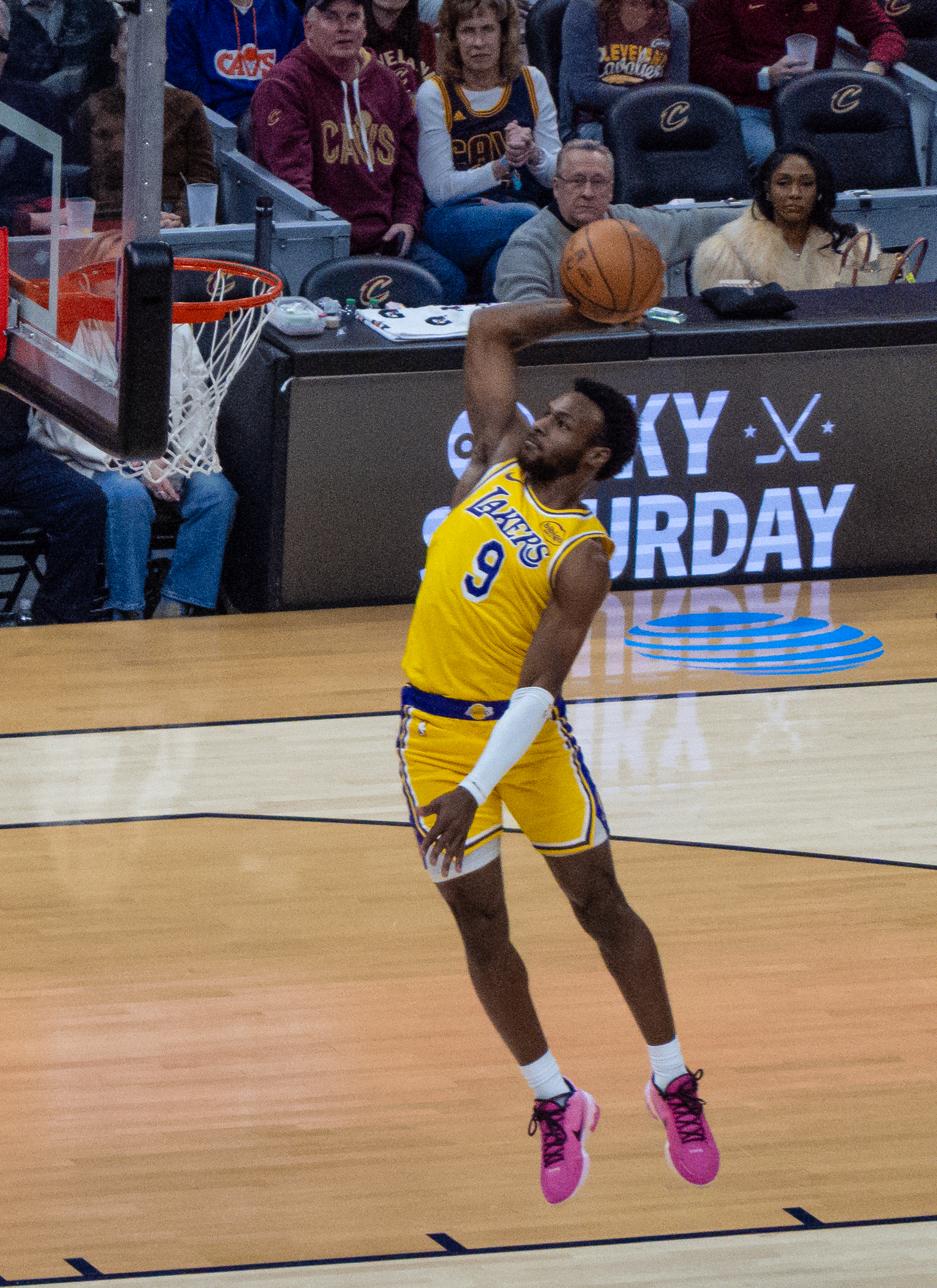
James in 2026

On June 27, 2024, James was selected by the Los Angeles Lakers with the 55th overall pick in the 2024 NBA draft. The selection paired James with his father, becoming the first-ever father–son duo to be in the NBA at the same time. On July 3, he signed a contract with the Lakers. He played for the Lakers in the NBA Summer League and played six games during the preseason.

On October 22, 2024, in the season opener against the Minnesota Timberwolves, James and his father became the first father–son duo to play together in the NBA. Bronny debuted with a rebound in three minutes of play in the Lakers' 110–103 win over the Timberwolves. On October 30, he scored his first NBA basket—alongside two assists and a steal—in a 134–110 loss to the Cleveland Cavaliers. Throughout his rookie season, James was assigned several times to the South Bay Lakers of the NBA G League. On December 12, 2024, he scored a game-high 30 points on 13-of-23 shooting in South Bay's 106–100 loss to the Valley Suns. On January 24, 2025, he scored a then career-high 31 points in a 122–110 win over the Rip City Remix.

On January 31, 2025, returning from the G League in a win over the Washington Wizards, James put up five points on 1–for–6 shooting, two rebounds, and two assists, playing the entire fourth quarter. On March 20, James recorded his first double-digit scoring game of his NBA career, co-leading the shorthanded Lakers with 17 points on 7-of-10 shooting and five assists in a 118–89 loss to the Milwaukee Bucks. On March 24, 2025, he scored a career and game-high 39 points with seven rebounds, four assists, a team-high four steals and one block in South Bay's 122–118 win over the Santa Cruz Warriors. In the Lakers' regular-season finale on April 13, with the team's starters rested, James made his first career start and finished with four points in a 109–81 loss to the Portland Trail Blazers.

On February 10, 2026, James had 12 points and six assists in a 136–108 loss to the San Antonio Spurs. On April 18, in a first–round matchup against the Houston Rockets, James and his father became the first father–son duo to play in a playoff game together.

James appeared in five of the Lakers' first nine games of the 2026–27 season, averaging 2.4 minutes and 0.8 points per game. On November 5, 2026, he was assigned to the Coachella Valley Lakers of the NBA G League. He was recalled two days later following a 22-point effort during Coachella Valley's season opener against the Salt Lake City Stars.

== Player profile ==
James stands at 6 feet 1 1/2 inches (1.87 m) barefoot and plays the point guard and shooting guard positions. Analysts during his high school years described shooting and defense as his main strengths, although he lacks the size of most NBA players with his skill set. James was at his best at catch-and-shoot situations and could also shoot off movement. He could defend point guards; his defensive anticipation and intensity were praised. In 2023, ESPN's Givony said James was developing into one of the top perimeter defenders in his high school class. Jonathan Wasserman described James as possessing a high basketball IQ and being a willing passer. Although he was a reliable ball-handler, he could struggle to create separation from defenders. His driving and finishing abilities were labeled as weaknesses, although he had the strength to finish through contact. James's playing style before entering the NBA drew comparisons to De'Anthony Melton, Lonzo Ball, Miles McBride, and Jrue Holiday.

== Allegations of nepotism ==
James has been described as a nepo baby, with critics suggesting that his father's influence played a significant role in his opportunities. After James was selected to play in the 2023 McDonald's All-American Game, recruiting analyst Dinos Trigonis raised concerns about a "smell of nepotism here that isn't good for our kids." The Los Angeles Lakers faced similar allegations after their selection of James in the 2024 NBA draft, which allowed him to play on the same team as his father despite widespread concerns about his lackluster college play and readiness for the league. According to ESPN analyst Bob Myers, James's agent, Rich Paul, discouraged other teams from selecting him in the draft, threatening to have him play overseas if chosen by another team. ESPN reporter Adrian Wojnarowski addressed the claims of nepotism by stating that such practices are prevalent in various roles in the NBA. James Jr.'s $2.2 million salary became fully guaranteed on June 29, 2026, one day before his dad announced he would be leaving the Lakers.

== Career statistics ==
Legend
GP	Games played	GS	Games started	MPG	Minutes per game
FG%	Field goal percentage	3P%	3-point field goal percentage	FT%	Free throw percentage
RPG	Rebounds per game	APG	Assists per game	SPG	Steals per game
BPG	Blocks per game	PPG	Points per game	**Bold**	Career high

=== NBA ===
==== Regular season ====
Year	Team	GP	GS	MPG	FG%	3P%	FT%	RPG	APG	SPG	BPG	PPG
2024–25	L.A. Lakers	27	**1**	6.7	.313	.281	.786	**.7**	.8	.3	**.1**	2.3
2025–26	L.A. Lakers	**42**	**1**	**8.9**	**.409**	**.386**	**.857**	.5	**1.2**	**.5**	**.1**	**2.9**
Career		69	2	8.1	.374	.348	.810	.6	1.1	.4	.1	2.7

==== Playoffs ====
Year	Team	GP	GS	MPG	FG%	3P%	FT%	RPG	APG	SPG	BPG	PPG
2025	L.A. Lakers	2	0	1.8	.000	.000	—	.0	.0	.0	.0	.0
2026	L.A. Lakers	**8**	0	**5.3**	**.500**	**.333**	—	**.4**	**.9**	**.1**	.0	**1.5**
Career		10	0	4.6	.417	.250	—	.3	.7	.1	.0	1.2

=== College ===
Year	Team	GP	GS	MPG	FG%	3P%	FT%	RPG	APG	SPG	BPG	PPG
2023–24	USC	25	6	19.3	.366	.267	.676	2.8	2.1	.8	.2	4.8

== Personal life ==
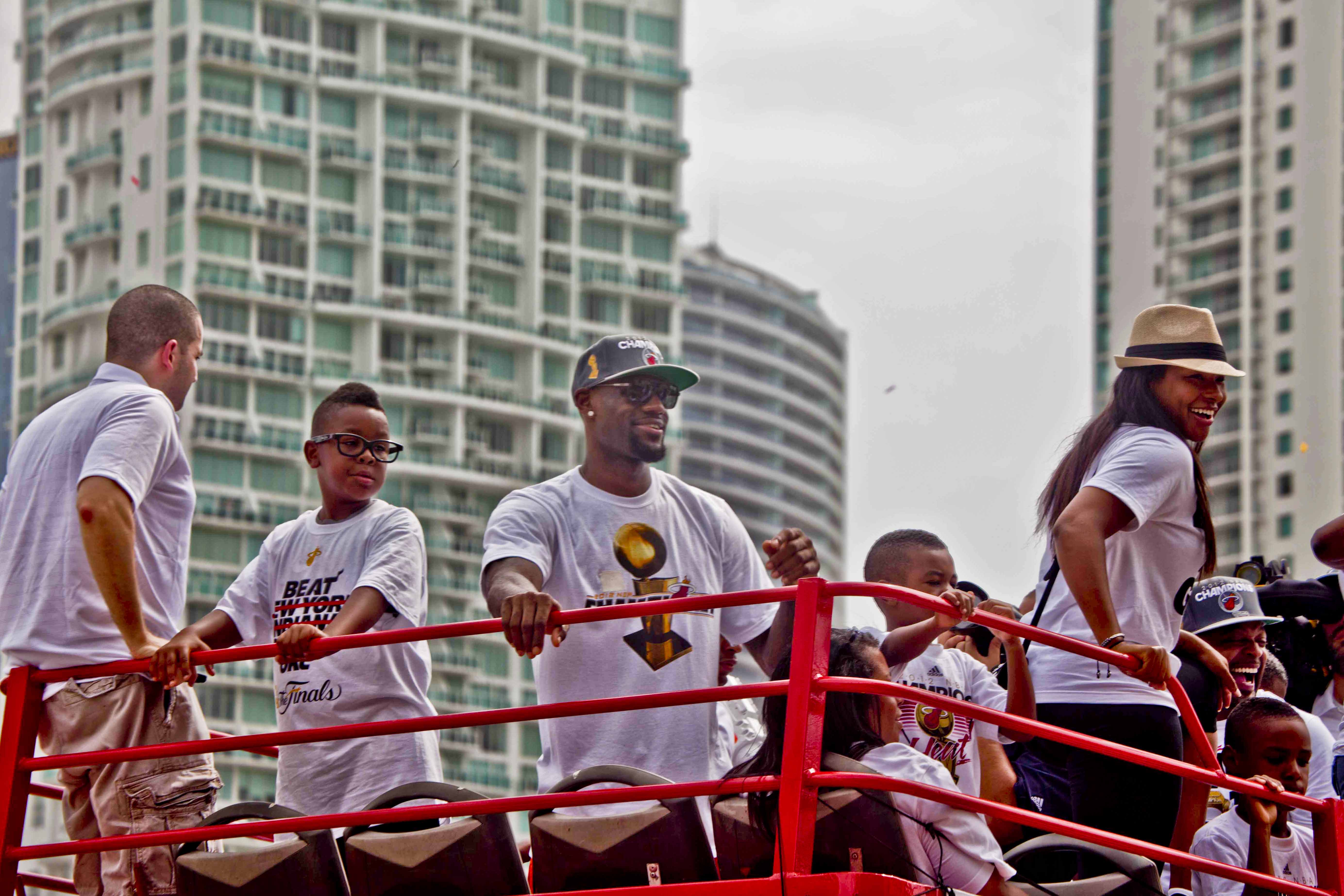
Bronny with his father LeBron (left) and mother Savannah (right) during the Miami Heat's 2012 NBA champions title celebration

James's godfather is NBA All-Star Chris Paul, who is a close friend of his father.

In 2020, James signed with esports organization FaZe Clan. Through the partnership, he was expected to stream Fortnite and Call of Duty: Warzone under the handle "FaZe Bronny." In June 2021, James made his first appearance on the cover of Sports Illustrated alongside members of FaZe Clan, including NFL quarterback Kyler Murray.

James has established a large social media following since high school. In May 2019, he started an Instagram account and reached one million followers in his first day on the platform. By the end of high school, James had over seven million followers on Instagram.

Analysts projected James to have one of the highest-earning potentials from his name, image and likeness (NIL) among college athletes. In February 2022, he filed for trademarks on variations of his name: Bronny, BJ Jr. and Bronald. In high school, James signed NIL deals with Nike and Beats by Dre.

James is an avid fan of hip-hop music, and has been seen listening to artists such as Yeat, SoFaygo, and Travis Scott, where the latter two performed for James at his 18th birthday party.

=== Basketball jersey number ===
James has worn the number 0 jersey because it is the number worn by his favorite NBA player, Russell Westbrook. He has also worn the number 23 jersey in honor of his father. In July 2024, James chose the number 9 jersey for his professional debut in the NBA during the 2024–25 Los Angeles Lakers season. The decision was made to honor the late musician Juice Wrld, alluding to Juice's 2017 debut EP 9 9 9.

== See also ==
- List of second-generation NBA players
