= Yotam Solomon =

American fashion designer

- יותם שלמון
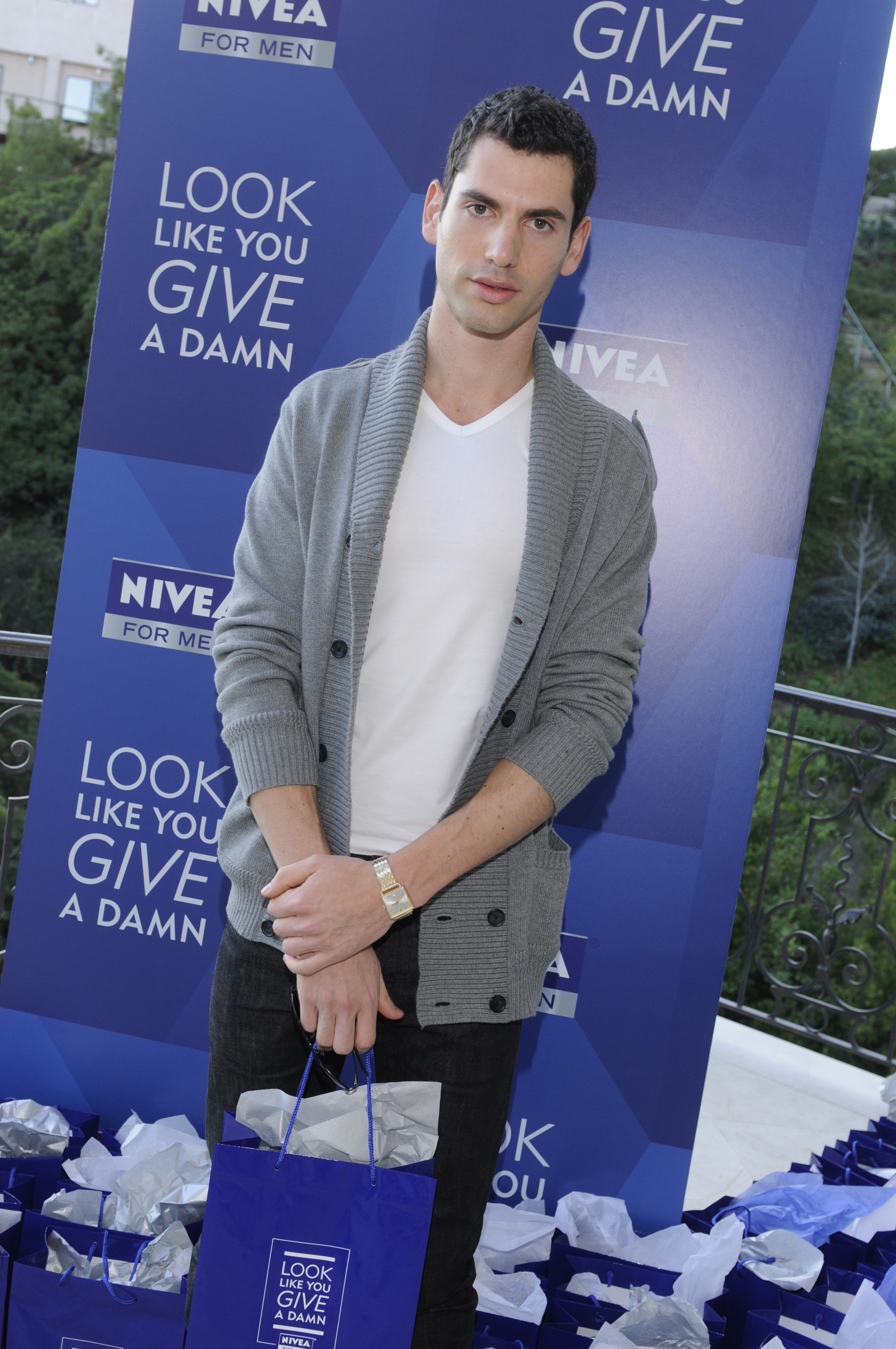
- Solomon at the Nivea For Men Mansion for the 68th Annual Golden Globes
- Born: March 28, 1987 (age 39); Israel
- Education: FIDM
- Occupation: Fashion designer
- Label: YOTAM SOLOMON
- Website: yotamsolomon.com

Yotam Solomon (Hebrew: יותם שלמון; born March 28, 1987) is a Los Angeles–based, Israeli-born fashion designer.

== Biography ==
=== Personal life ===
Solomon's grandparents migrated from Austria and Hungary to Israel after the Holocaust. A son of Israeli-born parents, Yotam grew up in Israel and attended art school through his teen years. A viola prodigy since he was young, Solomon moved to Los Angeles in 2003. He attended Beverly Hills High School and graduated from Santa Susana High School, where he received the National Orchestra Award in 2005. After Santa Susana High School, Yotam attended FIDM for Fashion Design and graduated with honors. After graduation, Solomon acquired a pattern-making position for a men's label. This job opportunity inspired him to start his own label, presenting his first Spring-Summer 2008 Ready to Wear and Footwear Collection during LA Fashion Week, October 2007. Since, Yotam has showcased successful collections in LA and New York fashion weeks.

As a supporter of the arts, Yotam explained his thoughts about the art world from a fashion perspective. In March 2010, Yotam had an interview with KiptonArt where he talked about how whatever artists are doing affects designers and whatever designers are doing affects artists, as designers and artists draw inspiration from one another.

=== Career ===
Yotam Solomon started his eponymous label in July 2007.

During the first night of NY Fashion's Night Out 2009, Yotam Solomon was selected for a presentation hosted by Tribeca. Design Within Reach collaborated with Yotam and Preston Lee, from Bravo's Top Design to celebrate "fashion and interior design". In the same year he was named "L.A.'s Top Young Designer" by AOL's Stylelist. For his Spring-Summer 2009 Runway show, Yotam decided to create a collection inspired by swimming pools, a Los Angeles staple. Los Angeles is filled with many swimming pools, like the famous Beverly Hills Hotel pool, the Sheats-Goldstein House by John Lautner, the Roosevelt Hotel in Hollywood and many others. Pools often have different colors and shapes, and some even living plants and fish. Solomon wanted to celebrate his upbringing by drawing inspiration from his teenage years where he was inspired by the colors, the shimmering, and the sheer beauty that many of us take for granted and showcase these effects as wearable art.

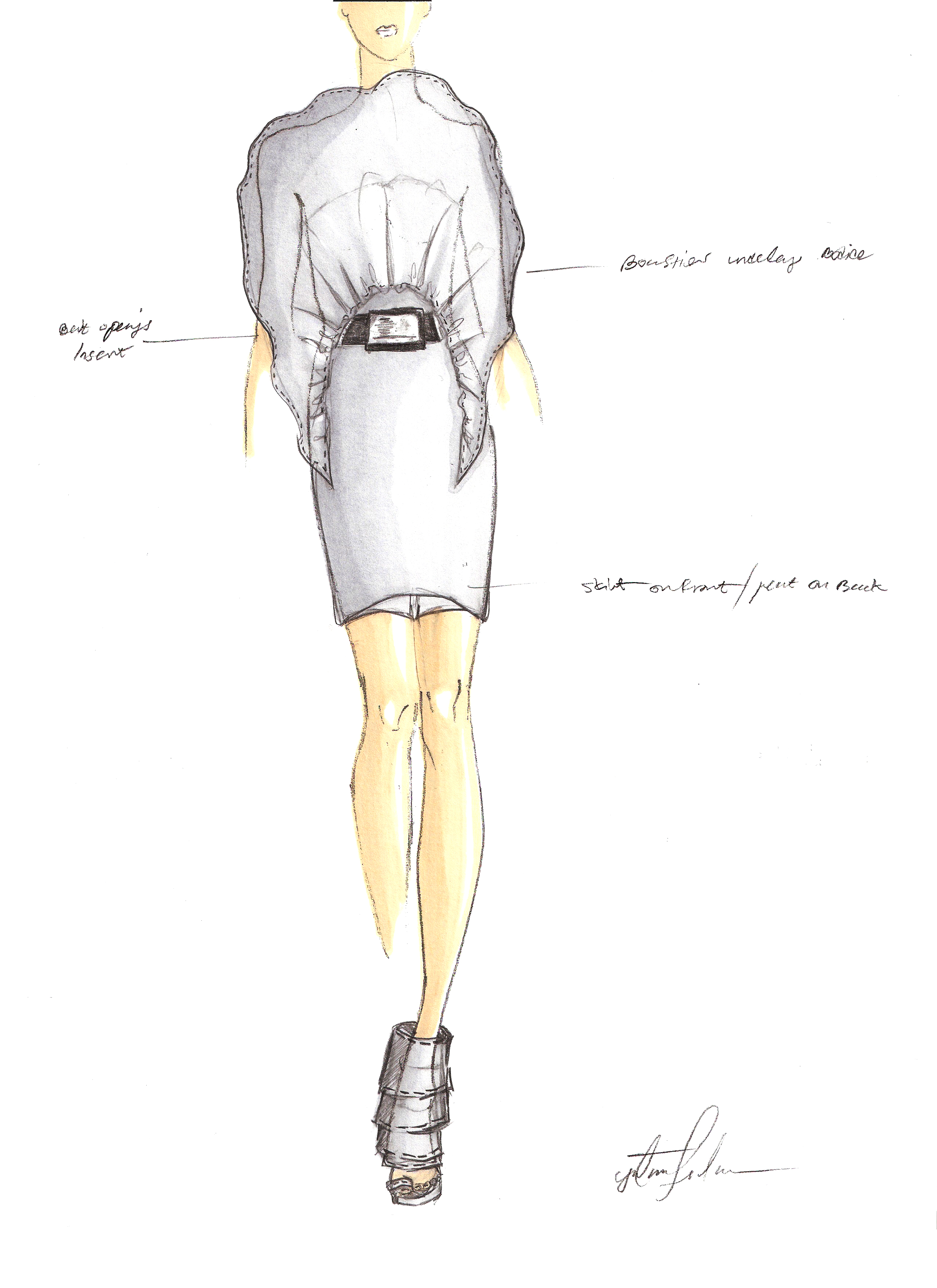
Featured in this hand sketch by designer Yotam Solomon, is a structured blouse with a matching pencil skirt with a layered front pleat. As a fashion designer Yotam experiments with shapes to create statement avant-garde designs that are sustainable and comfortable to the wearer.

Yotam Solomon presented his Fall 2010 collection, titled Native American Collection at a private event in the Hollywood Hills in March 2010. In 2010, Yotam celebrated Earth Day by unveiling his collection of living dresses as actor Matthew Morrison introduced the Dasani Plant Model Fashion Show, where Coca-Cola and Dasani celebrated the launch of their first plant-based bottle, made with up to 30 percent plants replacing petrochemicals. The show took place on an open-air runway at the Grove in Los Angeles.

In May 2010 Yotam became a spokesperson for LG Electronics, teaming up with Victoria Beckham and Eva Longoria, who represented two different phones. He was chosen by Beckham to create a capsule collection inspired by the LG Lotus Elite, and appeared with her in the commercial that aired on MTV. In September 2010 Yotam created a collection inspired by the BP oil spill in the Gulf of Mexico in order to raise awareness and funds. Receiving accolades from the media and fashion industry, Yotam was said to be "cleaning it up" by Refinery29.

In Fall 2010, Yotam Solomon launched a diffusion footwear line titled YOTAM SOLOMON II, which was announced by Women's Wear Daily.

In March 2012 Yotam took part in BREATHE LA's Attire to Inspire fashion fundraiser at the L.A. Live Conga Room. Yotam Solomon founded REVOterial, inspired by Revolutionary materials and the mission of creating cradle-to-cradle materials and products in the fashion and lifestyle sectors. Yotam Solomon joined the Los Angeles Cleantech Incubator as a resident company in 2014. In this image, Yotam is walking through the new LACI downtown Los Angeles campus, while under construction. It was completed and opened in 2015.

In 2019, Yotam Solomon joined Newlight Technologies as creative director and co-founder of Covalent AirCarbon. Yotam created a collection of formulated AirCarbon (created with sequestered methane) fashion and lifestyle products. AirCarbon was engineered to be extruded and injected-molded to create a material that can be manufactured using plug-and-play production methods and crafted with traditional methods as well. Featured in the image is the versatile strap Penrose clutch, Solomon created this patented strap design, the design also features a unisex handbag design with a laser-printed blockchain-tracked LCA generating a unique customer-facing experience that tracks the product's entire life-cycle. As part of the first collection, called the Gen Alpha, symbolizing the first carbon-negative capsule collection, it also reflects on the fact that the true impact will happen in the future with the next generation, Generation Alpha. Featured in the image is the unisex Poppy tote, made with AirCarbon vegan leather, its design is inspired by the native California poppy flower. As part of the collection, each product contains a laser-printed carbon date, representing a blockchain-tracked LCA that tracks the product's entire life-cycle.

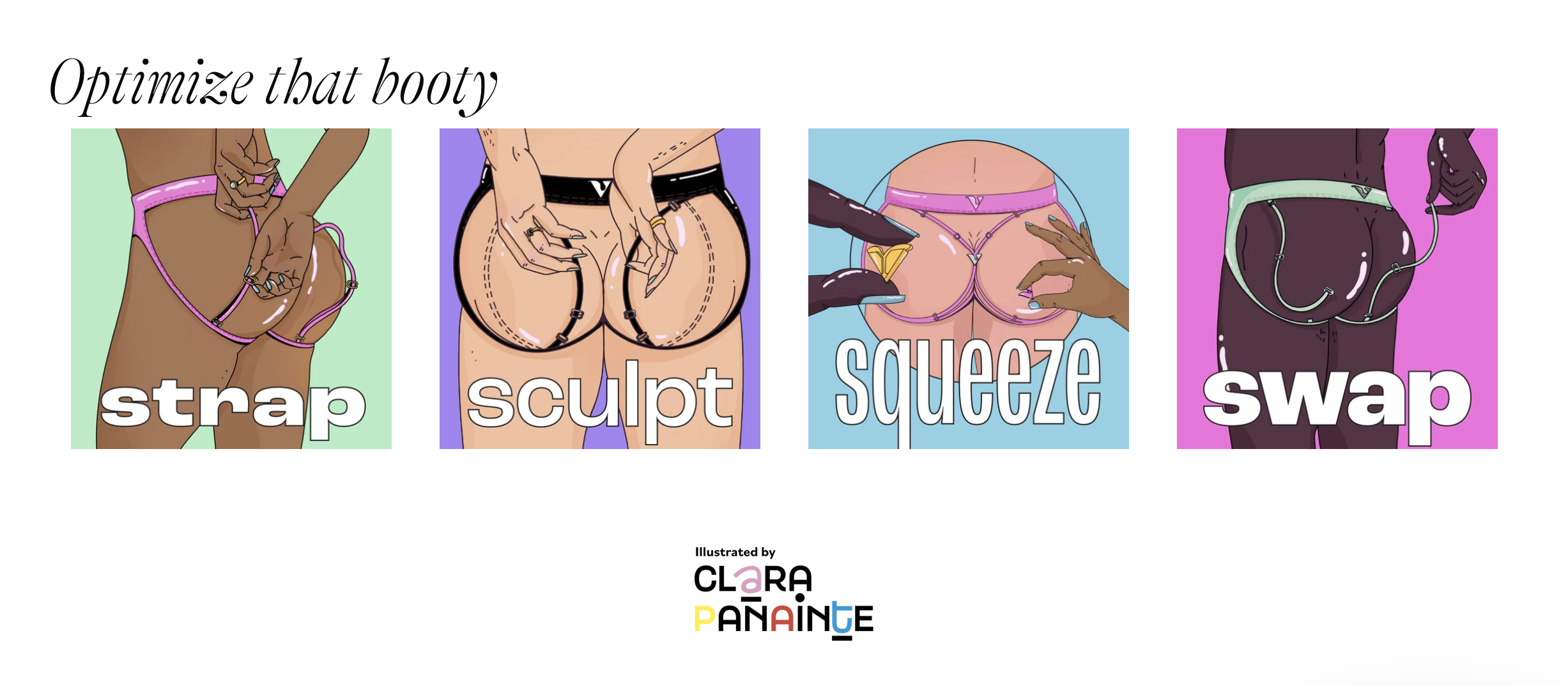
Strap, Sculpt, Squeeze

In January 2024, Solomon launched Virtue a genderless fluid fashion brand that promotes honest conversations. Virtue's 2024 hero product is the strap briefs a genderless reimagined jockstrap design, that is offered in a pouch fit for those who pack and a compact fit for those who tuck. Designer Yotam Solomon and Art director Noah Hilsenrad partnered with illustrator artist Clara Panainte to create illustrations showcasing the features of the Virtue strap briefs, based on the dozen ways the straps can be worn by showcasing some key features. The Guardian highlighted Virtue as an indie brand leading the charge in genderless and sustainable fashion, reflecting Solomon's broader philosophy of innovation and responsibility in the industry.

In November 2024, Solomon spearheaded Virtue's "Free Your Cheeks" campaign, an Election Day activation featured in VICE. The campaign used Virtue's strap briefs to celebrate themes of freedom and self-expression while encouraging civic engagement. This bold initiative further cemented Solomon's reputation as a designer at the forefront of cultural and social conversations, blending fashion with activism to challenge traditional norms and foster inclusivity.
