= The Malibu Beach Vampires =

1991 film directed by Francis Creighton

The Malibu Beach Vampires is a horror film. Filmed in 1991 and directed by Francis Patrick Creighton, the film is a vampire tale sporting a modern-day twist now featured on the DVD Blood Soaked Cinema: Bite Night. The vampires are neon bikini clad girls dancing on Malibu Beach to the song "Beach Blanket Bingo". The movie follows their three lovers, Colonel Oliver West (Rod Sweitzer), Congressman Terry Upstart (Marcus Frieshman), and Reverend Tim Fakker (Francis Creighton), who works with Pammy Faye (Gretchen House) and a group of tap dancers. One bite from a vampire forces the victim to speak the truth. Reverend Fakker lands himself 50 years in prison but finds the Lord, Congressman Upstart leaves politics and opens a dating service, and Colonel West retires from the Marines and opens a lingerie store.

== Spoofs ==
The opening theme, "Beach Blanket Bingo", first appeared in the 1965 movie, Beach Blanket Bingo. The dance sequence also features a poor imitation of the famous Michael Jackson "Thriller" monster walk.

Tim Fakker and Pammy Faye fund raise in the movie by performing faith healing, reminiscent of the scandalous fund raising activities between 1984–1987 of Jim Bakker and his wife Tammy Faye Bakker.

== Acclaim ==
The film was noted in a question on NPR's popular news quiz show Wait, Wait, Don't Tell Me. Host of the show Peter Sagal explained that The Malibu Beach Vampires is widely acclaimed by those few who have seen it as one of the worst movies ever made. One internet reviewer said, "Were I a weaker man, I most likely would have jammed grapefruit spoons into my eyes and then blindly flung myself to my death in oncoming traffic after watching this."

== Cast ==
- Kelly Galindo - Chairperson, Malibu Vampires, Inc.
- Christina Walker - Vice-President, Vampire Affairs
- Mimi Spivak - Vampire In Charge of Federal Budget
- Marcus Frishman - Congressman Terry Upstart
- Rod Sweitzer - Colonel Oliver West
- Gretchen House - Pammy Faye Fakker
- Francis Creighton - Rev. Fakker
- Anet Anatelle - Wannabe Cher
- Cherie Romans - Girl Who Failed Her S.A.T.
- Yvette Buchanan - Rocket Scientist
- Joan Rudelstein - Brain Surgeon
- Becky LeBeau - Census Taker
- Angelyne - Barbara Bush Impersonator
- Mario Chapel
- La Joy Farr
- Jack Fitzgerald
- J. Adams
- Titus Moede (as Titus Moody)
- The Malibu Dolphins
