= Out of the Closet =

American thrift store chain

- Founded: 1990
- Founder: Michael Weinstein
- Location(s): 4905 Hollywood Boulevard; Los Angeles, California
- Origins: Atwater Village, Los Angeles, California
- Region served: California, Florida
- Product: Pre-owned merchandise
- Owner: AIDS Healthcare Foundation
- Key people: Michael Weinstein, President; Laura Nelson, CFO
- Revenue: 5.8 million (2006)
- Website: www.outofthecloset.org

Out of the Closet is a nonprofit chain of mission-driven thrift stores whose revenues provide medical care for patients with HIV/AIDS. The chain is owned and operated by AIDS Healthcare Foundation (AHF), a Los Angeles, California-based charity that provides medical, preventive, and educational resources for patients. AHF is the largest nonprofit HIV/AIDS healthcare, research, prevention, and education provider in the world. According to AHF, there are 25 OTC stores in nine U.S. states.

Out of the Closet (OTC) thrift stores generate income to help fund the medical services AHF provides for those patients who are unable to pay. Proceeds from OTC thrift stores directly benefit AHF, with 96 cents of every dollar taken in at a thrift store going toward providing HIV/AIDS care. At certain OTC locations, the organization provides free rapid HIV testing and medication pick-up services through AHF pharmacies, in addition to men's and women's clothing, furniture, dishes, decor, books, albums, and other products.

== Background ==
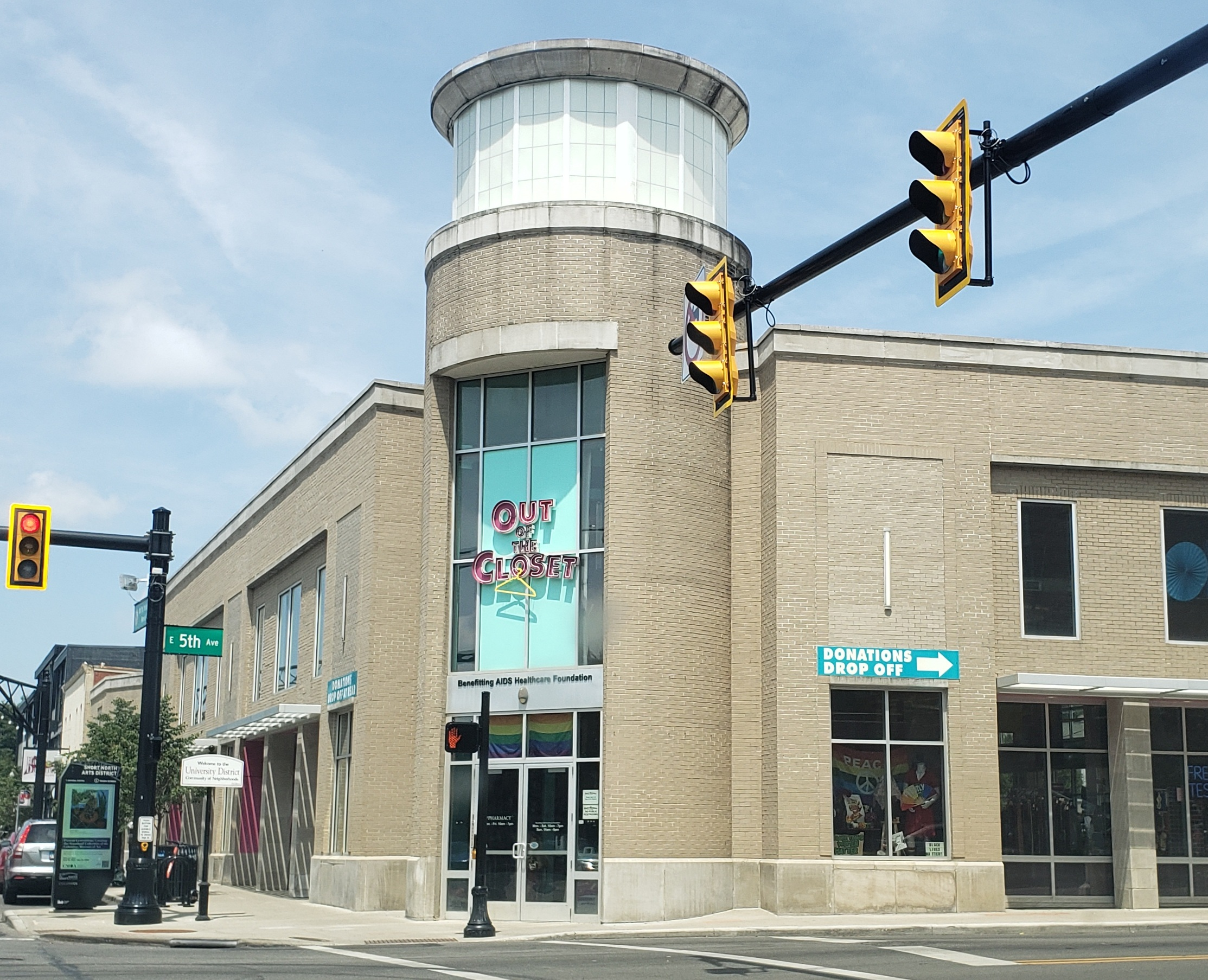
An Out of the Closet location in The Short North district of Columbus, Ohio, at 5th Avenue and High Street.

Out of the Closet was founded by AHF president Michael Weinstein, whose retail experience stemmed from his family's furniture business on the East Coast. He opened the first location in Atwater Village in 1990. The "Out of the Closet" name has been federally trademarked by AHF since 1997.

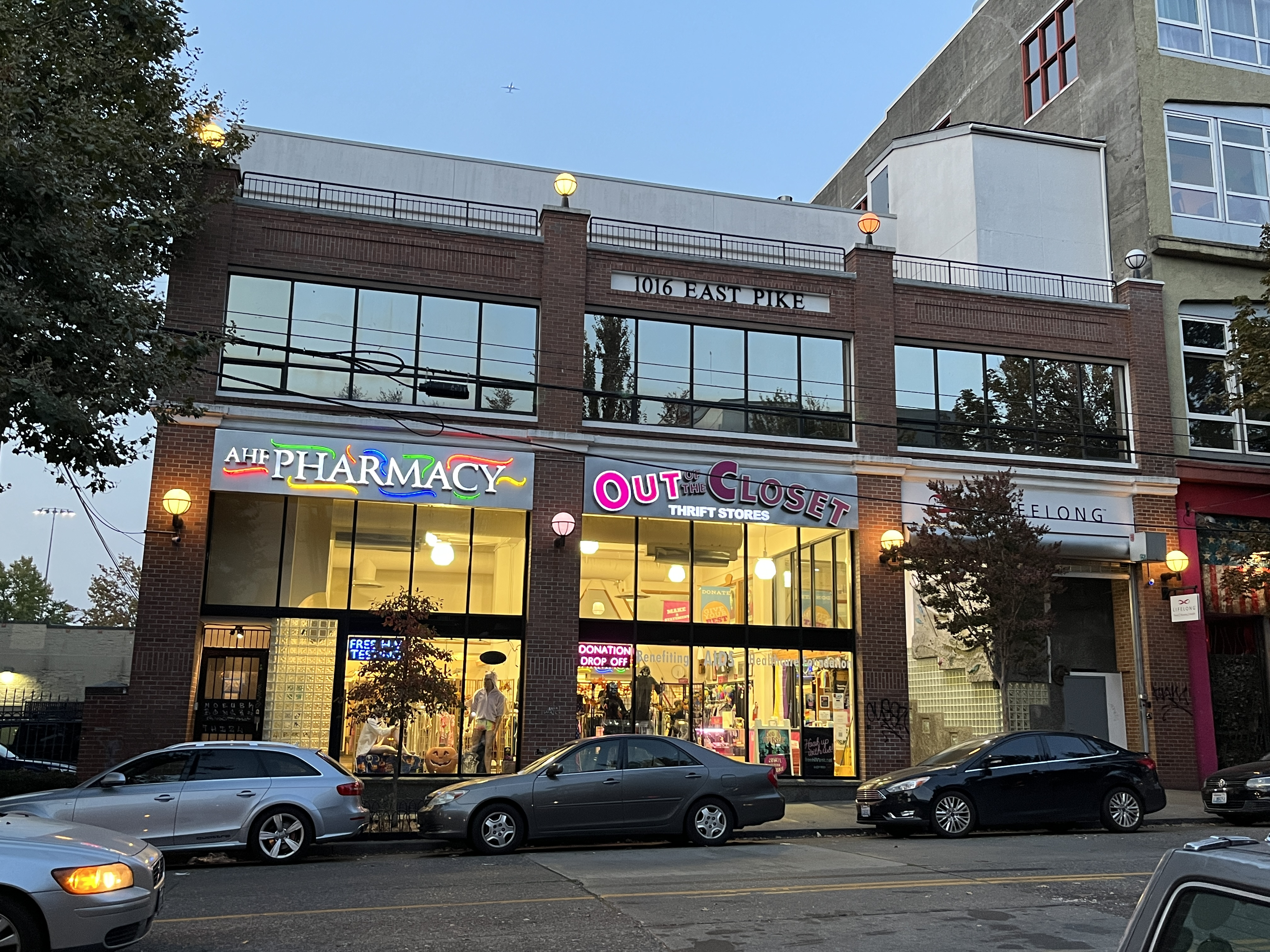
Out of the Closet, Capitol Hill, Seattle, 2022

There are more than 20 OTC locations throughout the United States, including the Los Angeles area, San Francisco Bay Area, Florida, Illinois, Ohio, Texas, and New York City. An OTC location opened in Capitol Hill, Seattle in 2014. A Houston location opened in 2019, followed by an Austin opening in 2024.

In addition to regular thrift store operations, several stores offer healthcare services, including free rapid HIV and STD testing on a walk-in basis, along with counseling in a separate location of the store. AHF also provides wraparound services with no barriers to treatment, such as connecting patients with case managers and health benefits counselors, with the end goal of HIV suppression.

OTC locations have provided free clothing for transgender and gender non-conforming students at colleges and universities, such as Roanoke College in Virginia.

== Accolades ==
Out of the Closet thrift stores have garnered various accolades. Out South Florida named the OTC location in Wilton Manors the “Best Thrift Store in Broward County” in 2023 and 2024, in addition to similar awards in Miami, Fort Lauderdale, and Orlando.

In 2024, OTC was named the “Best Local Resale or Thrift Store” in Houston, and one of the best thrift stores for “secondhand savings” in Dallas. That same year, the Columbus, Ohio location was recognized for its free HIV testing services.
