= Jotham Tumwesigye =

Ugandan Supreme Court Justice (born c.1948)

Jotham Tumwesigye is a Ugandan lawyer and judge who has served as a Justice of the Supreme Court of Uganda since 2009.

== Background and education ==
He was born in Uganda circa 1948. He graduated from Makerere University in 1974, with a Bachelor of Laws. He also holds a Diploma in Legal Practice.

== Career ==
Following his graduation from the Law Development Centre, he worked as a state attorney in the Uganda Ministry of Justice until 1981.

Between 1981 and 1986, he lived in exile in Kenya, where he lectured at the Kenya Institute of Administration; the institution which is now the Kenya School of Government. He was part of the group that crafted the 1995 Uganda Constitution. Later, he served as the Inspector General of Government and then as chairperson of the Uganda Human Rights Commission. From 2000 until 2009, he served as the Inspector General of Government (IGG). In 2009, he was appointed to the Supreme Court of Uganda.

== Other considerations ==
In addition to his duties at the Supreme Court, Jotham Tumwesigye concurrently serves as the head of the "Judicial Integrity Committee", which monitors the integrity of judicial officers. He also represented the Uganda judiciary on the "Judicial Service Commission", a position he took over from the former Chief Justice, Bart Magunda Katureebe. He previously served as chairman of the "Directorate of Citizenship and Immigration", a division of the Uganda Ministry of Internal Affairs.

== See also ==
- Judiciary of Uganda
