= First Family of Hip Hop =

American reality television series

- Genre: Reality
- Starring: Darnell Roy
- Country of origin: United States
- Original language: English
- No. of seasons: 1
- No. of episodes: 8

Production
- Executive producers: Banks Tarver; Ken Druckerman; Anneka Jones; Danielle Medina; Ashley M. Buie
- Running time: 42 minutes
- Production companies: Left/Right; Mad Fusion

Original release
- Network: Bravo
- Release: January 15 – March 19, 2017

First Family of Hip Hop is an American reality television series that premiered on the Bravo cable network, on January 15, 2017, and ended on March 19. The show follows the life of the family of late Sylvia Robinson.

== Cast ==
- Leland Robinson, Sr.
- Leland Robinson, Jr.
- Rhondo Robinson, Jr.
- Darnell Robinson
- Kasin Robinson
- LeA Robinson
- Antonio Jordan
- Eseni Ellington
- Shanell "Lady Luck" Jones
- Somaya Reece
- Sasha Robinson

== Production ==
First Family of Hip Hop was announced in October 2016, when Bravo had commissioned a new reality series alongside a state of renewals with Left/Right Productions would serve as producer foe the upcoming series First Family of Hip Hop alongside Mad Fusion.

== Broadcast ==
The series premiered in Australia on Arena on February 27, 2017.
