= LeBron James =

American basketball player (born 1984)

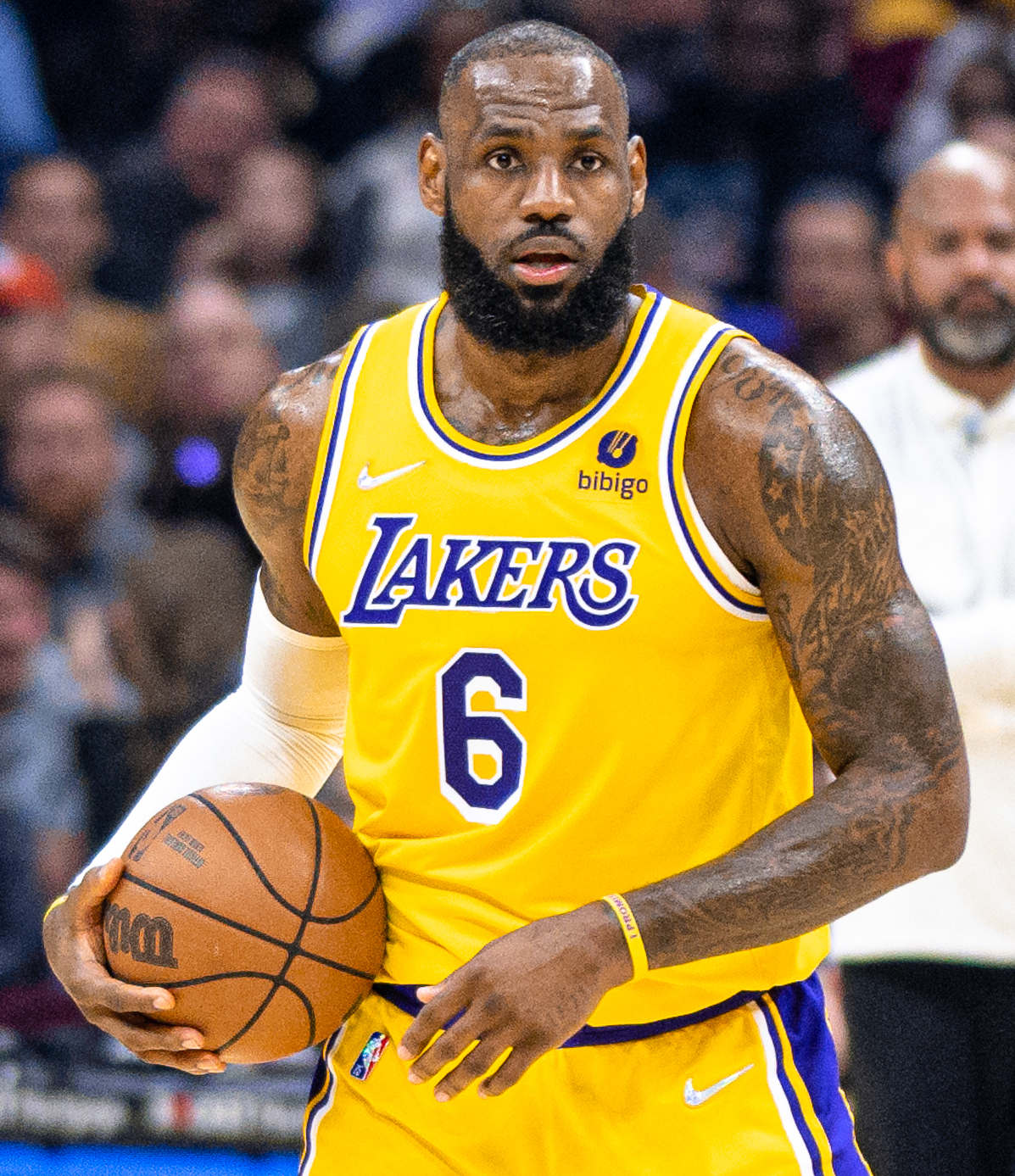
- James with the Los Angeles Lakers in 2022

No. 23 – Philadelphia 76ers
- Position: Small forward / power forward
- League: NBA

Personal information
- Born: December 30, 1984 (age 41) Akron, Ohio, U.S.
- Listed height: 6 ft 9 in (2.06 m)
- Listed weight: 250 lb (113 kg)

Career information
- High school: St. Vincent–St. Mary (Akron, Ohio)
- NBA draft: 2003: 1st round, 1st overall pick
- Drafted by: Cleveland Cavaliers
- Playing career: 2003–present

Career history
- 2003–2010: Cleveland Cavaliers
- 2010–2014: Miami Heat
- 2014–2018: Cleveland Cavaliers
- 2018–2026: Los Angeles Lakers
- 2026–present: Philadelphia 76ers

Career highlights
- 4× NBA champion (2012, 2013, 2016, 2020); 4× NBA Finals MVP (2012, 2013, 2016, 2020); 4× NBA Most Valuable Player (2009, 2010, 2012, 2013); 22× NBA All-Star (2005–2026); 3× NBA All-Star Game MVP (2006, 2008, 2018); 13× All-NBA First Team (2006, 2008–2018, 2020); 4× All-NBA Second Team (2005, 2007, 2021, 2025); 4× All-NBA Third Team (2019, 2022–2024); 5× NBA All-Defensive First Team (2009–2013); NBA All-Defensive Second Team (2014); NBA Rookie of the Year (2004); NBA All-Rookie First Team (2004); NBA scoring champion (2008); NBA assists leader (2020); NBA Cup champion (2023); NBA Cup MVP (2023); NBA 75th Anniversary Team; Olympics MVP (2024); AP Male Athlete of the Decade (2010s); 4× AP Male Athlete of the Year (2013, 2016, 2018, 2020); 3× Sports Illustrated Sportsperson of the Year (2012, 2016, 2020); USA Basketball Male Athlete of the Year (2012); 2× Gatorade Male Basketball Player of the Year (2002, 2003); 2× First-team Parade All-American (2002, 2003); Second-team Parade All-American (2001); 3× Ohio Mr. Basketball (2001–2003)
- Stats at NBA.com
- Stats at Basketball Reference
Medals
Men's basketball
Representing the United States
Olympic Games
Gold medal – first place	2008 Beijing	Team
Gold medal – first place	2012 London	Team
Gold medal – first place	2024 Paris	Team
Bronze medal – third place	2004 Athens	Team
FIBA World Championship
Bronze medal – third place	2006 Japan
FIBA Americas Championship
Gold medal – first place	2007 Las Vegas

LeBron Raymone James (Note: Pronunciation of "LeBron": /ləˈbrɒn/ lə-BRON) (born December 30, 1984) is an American professional basketball player who plays as a forward for the Philadelphia 76ers of the National Basketball Association (NBA). Nicknamed "King James", he is the NBA's all-time leading scorer and has won four NBA championships from 10 NBA Finals appearances, including eight consecutive appearances between 2011 and 2018. He has won three Olympic gold medals as a member of the U.S. national team. James is widely regarded as one of the greatest basketball players of all time. (Note: Attributed to multiple references:)

James ranks third in NBA career assists and sixth in NBA career steals, and has won four NBA MVP awards, four Finals MVP awards, three All-Star Game MVP awards, the Rookie of the Year award, the inaugural NBA Cup MVP, and the Olympics MVP. He has been selected for the All-Star roster a record 22 times; to the All-NBA Team 21 times, including to the First Team a record 13 times; and to the All-Defensive Team six times. The oldest active player in the NBA, he holds league records for the most seasons played with 24, the most games played, the most minutes played, and the most field goals.

Born and raised in Akron, Ohio, James gained national attention at St. Vincent–St. Mary High School and was heavily touted as a future NBA superstar for his scoring, passing, and playmaking abilities. A prep-to-pro, the Cleveland Cavaliers selected James with the first overall pick of the 2003 NBA draft. He won Rookie of the Year and quickly established himself as one of the league's premier players, leading Cleveland to its first NBA Finals appearance in 2007 and winning the scoring title in 2008. After winning back-to-back MVPs in 2009 and 2010, he joined the Miami Heat as a free agent in 2010, a controversial move announced in the television special The Decision.

With the Heat, James won his first two NBA championships in 2012 and 2013, earning MVP and Finals MVP honors both years. After four seasons in Miami, he returned to Cleveland in 2014, leading the Cavaliers to their first-ever championship in 2016 and ending the Cleveland sports curse. He signed with the Los Angeles Lakers in 2018, winning another title in 2020 and becoming the first player to be named Finals MVP with three different teams. After eight years with the Lakers, James signed with the Philadelphia 76ers in 2026.

James was the first player in NBA history to accumulate $1 billion in earnings as an active player and has been listed by Forbes as one of the world's ten highest-paid athletes fifteen times. Time named him as one of the 100 most influential people in the world four times—the most for a professional athlete.

== Early life ==
LeBron Raymone James was born on December 30, 1984, (Note: He was born at 4:39 p.m. EST.) at Summa Health Akron Campus (Note: Then known as Akron City Hospital) in Akron, Ohio, to 16-year-old Gloria Marie James. His father, Anthony McClelland, who had an extensive criminal record including arson and theft, was not involved in James's life. (Note: Attributed to multiple references:) During James's childhood, the family often struggled, moving between apartments in the more run‑down neighborhoods of Akron while Gloria sought steady employment. Realizing that her son would benefit from a more stable environment, she allowed him to live with the family of Frank Walker, a local youth football coach who introduced James to basketball when he was nine.

James began playing organized basketball in the fifth grade. He later competed in Amateur Athletic Union (AAU) basketball for the Northeast Ohio Shooting Stars. The team achieved success locally and nationally, led by James and his friends Sian Cotton, Dru Joyce III, and Willie McGee. The group called themselves the "Fab Four" and agreed that they would attend high school together. In a decision that generated local controversy, they enrolled at St. Vincent–St. Mary High School, a private Catholic school with a predominantly white student body.

== High school career ==
=== Basketball ===
As a 6-foot-2-inch (1.88 m) tall freshman, James averaged 18 points and 6 rebounds per game for the St. Vincent–St. Mary varsity basketball team. The team, known as The Fighting Irish, went 27–0 en route to the Division III state title, making them the only boys high school team in Ohio to finish the season undefeated. As a sophomore, James averaged 25.2 points and 7.2 rebounds, along with 5.8 assists and 3.8 steals per game. For some home games during the season, St. Vincent–St. Mary played at the University of Akron's 5,492-seat Rhodes Arena to satisfy ticket demand from alumni and fans, as well as college and NBA scouts who wanted to see James play. The Fighting Irish finished the season 26–1 and repeated as state champions. For his outstanding play, James was named Ohio Mr. Basketball and was selected for the USA Today All-USA First Team, becoming the first sophomore to achieve either.

In 2001, during the summer before his junior year, James was the subject of a feature article in Slam magazine. Writer Ryan Jones lauded the 16-year-old James, who had grown to 6 feet 7 inches (2.01 m), as "[possibly] the best high school basketball player in America right now". During the season, James also appeared on the cover of Sports Illustrated, becoming the first high school basketball underclassman to do so. With averages of 29 points, 8.3 rebounds, 5.7 assists, and 3.3 steals per game, he was again named Ohio Mr. Basketball and selected to the USA Today All-USA First Team, and became the first junior to be named male basketball Gatorade National Player of the Year. St. Vincent–St. Mary finished the year with a 23–4 record, ending their season with a loss in the Division II championship game. Following the loss, James unsuccessfully petitioned for a change to the NBA's draft eligibility rules in an attempt to enter the 2002 NBA draft. During this time, he used marijuana, which he said was to help cope with the stress that resulted from the constant media attention he was receiving.

During his senior year, James and the Fighting Irish played against several nationally ranked teams, including Oak Hill Academy on December 12, 2002. The game was nationally televised on ESPN2. Time Warner Cable, looking to capitalize on James's popularity, offered St. Vincent–St. Mary's games to Ohio-based subscribers for $7.95 per game on a pay-per-view basis throughout the season, but this ended up not being profitable. For the year, James averaged 31.6 points, 9.6 rebounds, 4.6 assists, and 3.4 steals per game, was named Ohio Mr. Basketball and selected to the USA Today All-USA First Team for an unprecedented third consecutive year, and was named Gatorade National Player of the Year for the second consecutive year. He participated in three year-end high school basketball all-star games—the EA Sports Roundball Classic, the Jordan Brand Capital Classic, and the McDonald's All-American Game—losing his National Collegiate Athletic Association (NCAA) eligibility and making it official that he would enter the 2003 NBA draft.

James was at the center of several controversies during his senior year. For his 18th birthday, James skirted state amateur bylaws by accepting a Hummer H2 as a gift from his mother, who had secured a loan for the vehicle by utilizing James's future earning power as an NBA player. This prompted an investigation by the Ohio High School Athletic Association (OHSAA) because its guidelines stated that no amateur may accept any gift valued over $100 as a reward for athletic performance. James was cleared of any wrongdoing because he had accepted the vehicle from a family member and not from an agent or any outside source. Later in the season, James accepted two throwback jerseys worth $845 from an urban clothing store in exchange for posing for pictures, violating OHSAA rules and resulting in his being stripped of his high school sports eligibility. James appealed the ruling and his penalty was eventually dropped to a two-game suspension, allowing him to play the remainder of the year. The Irish were also forced to forfeit one of their wins, their only official loss that season. In his first game back after the suspension, James scored a career-high 52 points. St. Vincent–St. Mary won the Division II championship, marking their third division title in four years.

=== Football ===
As an underclassman, James played wide receiver for St. Vincent–St. Mary's football team. He was recruited by some Division I programs, including Notre Dame. At the end of his second year, James was named first team all-state, and as a junior, he helped lead the Fighting Irish to the state semifinals. James did not play during his senior year because of a wrist injury that he sustained in an AAU basketball game. Some sports analysts, football critics, high school coaches, as well as former and current professional players have speculated that James could have played in the National Football League (NFL). (Note: These include Ryan Jones, Tim Graham, John Breech, Bill Barnwell, and Ryan Wilson.)

== Professional career ==
=== Cleveland Cavaliers (2003–2010) ===
==== 2003–2004: Rookie of the Year ====
The Cleveland Cavaliers selected James as the first overall pick of the 2003 NBA draft. James chose jersey number 23 in honor of Michael Jordan. In his first regular season game, James scored 25 points in a 106–92 loss to the Sacramento Kings, setting an NBA record for the most points scored by a prep-to-pro player in his debut performance. At the conclusion of the 2003–04 season, James became the first Cavalier to receive the NBA Rookie of the Year Award. and only the third player in league history to average at least 20 points, five rebounds, and five assists per game as a rookie.

==== 2004–2008: Rise to superstardom ====
In the 2004–05 season, James earned his first NBA All-Star Game selection, contributing 13 points, 8 rebounds, and 6 assists in a winning effort for the Eastern Conference. Teams took note of his rapid development, and Denver Nuggets coach George Karl told Sports Illustrated: "It's weird talking about a 20-year-old kid being a great player, but he is a great player ... He's the exception to almost every rule." On March 20, James scored 56 points against the Toronto Raptors, setting Cleveland's new single-game points record. At the end of the season, James was named to his first All-NBA Team. The Cavaliers again failed to make the playoffs, finishing the season 42–40. During the 2006 offseason, James signed a three-year, $60 million contract extension with the Cavaliers, with the option for a fourth year.

At the 2006 All-Star Game, James led the Eastern Conference to victory with 29 points and was named the NBA All-Star Game Most Valuable Player (MVP). He finished second in overall NBA MVP Award voting, behind Steve Nash. Under James's leadership, the Cavaliers qualified for the playoffs for the first time since 1998. In his postseason debut, James recorded a triple-double in a win over the Washington Wizards. In Game 3, he made the first game-winning basket of his career, and another in Game 5. Cleveland defeated the Wizards before losing to the Detroit Pistons in the second round.

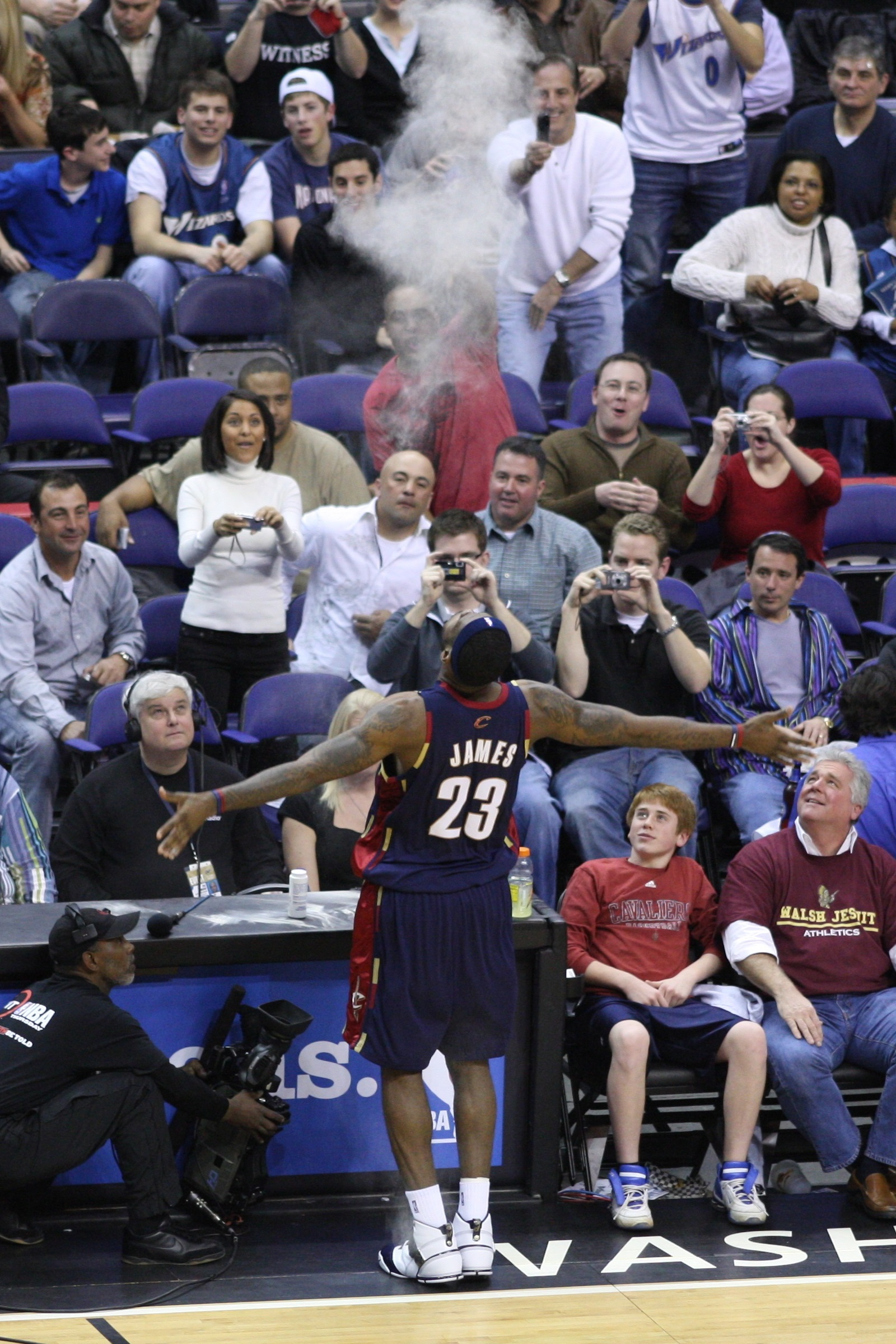
James engages in a pre-game ritual of tossing crushed chalk into the air in March 2008.

The Cavaliers finished the 2006–07 season with 50 wins and entered the playoffs as the second seed in the Eastern Conference. In the first two rounds, James led the team to wins over the Wizards and New Jersey Nets, earning them a matchup with the Pistons in the Eastern Conference finals. In Game 5, James logged 48 points with nine rebounds and seven assists in a 109–107 double-overtime win. He scored the last 25 points for the Cavaliers, and performed a game-winning layup with 2.2 seconds left. In 2012, ESPN ranked James's performance as the fourth greatest in modern NBA playoff history. The Cavaliers won the series in six games, granting them their first NBA Finals appearance, which pitted them against the San Antonio Spurs. The Spurs defeated the Cavaliers in a four-game sweep.

On December 11, 2007, James came off the bench for the first time in his career. (Note: In other words, he was not part of the starting five-man squad at the beginning of the game.) He chose to enter the game at the same time as his teammate Anderson Varejão—who had been involved in a pay dispute with Cavaliers management—to prevent fans from booing Varejão. In February of the 2007–08 season, James was named All-Star Game MVP for the second time after a 27-point, eight-rebound, and nine-assist performance. On March 21, he surpassed Brad Daugherty as the Cavaliers' all-time leading scorer. James's 30 points per game were the highest in the league, marking his first scoring title. Seeded fourth in the East entering the playoffs, the Cavaliers defeated the Wizards, before being eliminated by the Boston Celtics in the next round.

==== 2008–2010: MVP seasons ====
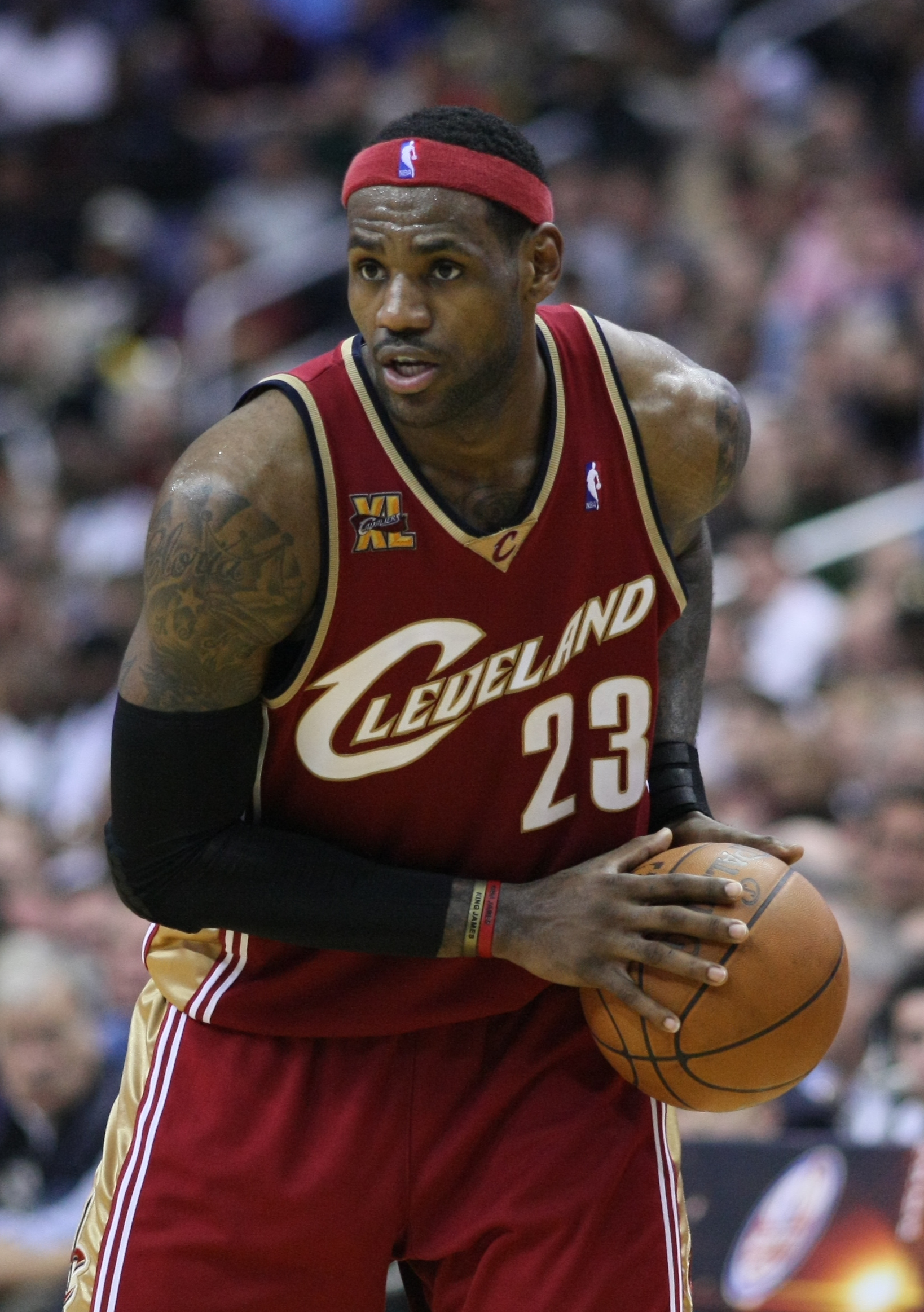
James with the Cavaliers in 2009.

At the end of the 2008–2009 season, James finished second in the voting for the NBA Defensive Player of the Year Award. He made his first NBA All-Defensive Team, with 23 chase-down blocks and a career-high 93 total blocks. With James's play and the acquisition of All-Star guard Mo Williams, Cleveland went a franchise record 66–16; James became the first Cavalier to win the MVP Award. John Hollinger of ESPN described James's season as "arguably the greatest individual season in history".

In the 2009 playoffs, Cleveland swept the Pistons and the Atlanta Hawks to earn a matchup with the Orlando Magic in the Eastern Conference Finals. The Cavaliers lost Game 1, despite James scoring 49 points on 66 percent shooting. In Game 2, James hit a game-winner to tie the series 1–1. Cleveland lost the series in six games; following the loss, James left the court without shaking hands with his opponents, which was viewed as unsportsmanlike by some. James averaged 35.3 points per game during the playoffs.

In February of the 2009–10 season, James was forced into a temporary point guard role following injuries to players in the Cavaliers' backcourt. With James's leadership, Cleveland finished the year with the best record in the league. James shot over 50% on field goals for the first time in his career, and he received his second NBA MVP Award. To open the playoffs, Cleveland advanced past the Chicago Bulls to earn a matchup with the Celtics in the second round. James was criticized for not playing well in Game 5, shooting only 20 percent on 14 shots and scoring 15 points. The Cavaliers suffered their worst loss in franchise history; at the conclusion, James walked off the court to boos from Cleveland's crowd. The Cavaliers were eliminated from the postseason in Game 6.

=== Miami Heat (2010–2014) ===
==== The Decision ====
James became an unrestricted free agent on July 1, 2010. He was contacted by several teams, including the Bulls, Los Angeles Clippers, Miami Heat, New York Knicks, New Jersey Nets, and Cavaliers. On July 8, James announced on a live ESPN special titled The Decision that he would sign with the Heat. The special was broadcast from the Boys & Girls Club of Greenwich, Connecticut and raised $2.5 million for the organization. An additional $3.5 million was raised from advertising revenue, and was donated to other charities. The day before the special aired, fellow free agents Chris Bosh and Dwyane Wade announced they would sign with Miami. James joined with Bosh and Wade in part so he could shoulder less of the offensive load, and he thought he would have a better chance of winning an NBA championship with the Heat. Heat president Pat Riley played a major role in convincing James to play on the team with Bosh and Wade. James would be relieved of the burden of scoring, and thought he could be the first player since Oscar Robertson to average a triple-double in a season. James, Bosh and Wade were referred to as an NBA superteam.

Upon leaving the Cavaliers, James drew criticism from executives, fans, and current and former players. The Decision was viewed as unnecessary. Many thought the prolonged wait for James's choice was unprofessional, as not even the teams courting him were aware of his decision until moments before the show. Upon learning that James would not be returning to Cleveland, Cavaliers owner Dan Gilbert published a letter to fans in which he denounced James's actions. Some angry fans of the team recorded videos of themselves burning his jersey. Former NBA players, including Michael Jordan and Magic Johnson, were critical of James, condemning him for forming a superteam with Bosh and Wade in Miami and not trying to win a championship in Cleveland. Some commentators defended James's decision to join Miami by noting the Cavaliers' inability to build strong support around him. They argued other NBA greats had benefitted from talented teammates. James drew further criticism in an interview with CNN when he claimed race might have been a factor in the fallout from The Decision. The phrase "taking my talents to South Beach" became a punch line for critics. James later expressed regret over his handling of The Decision. (Note: Attributed to multiple references:)

==== 2010–2011: Year of media and fan scrutiny ====
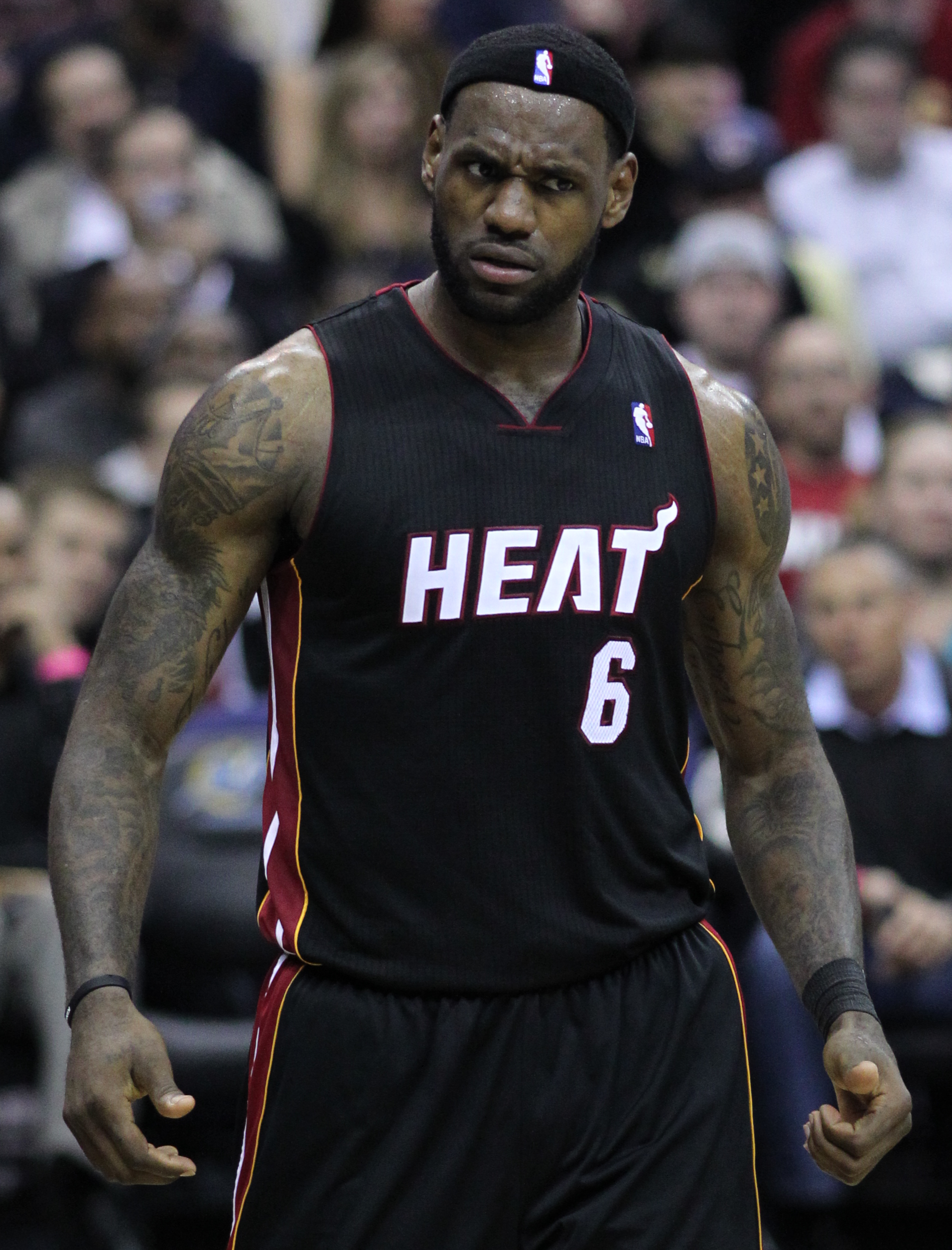
James as a member of the Heat in March 2011.

James signed a 6-year, $110 million contract with the Heat on July 10, 2010. (Note: Attributed to multiple references:) He changed his jersey number to 6, as the number 23 was retired in Miami for Michael Jordan. The Heat threw a welcome party for the "Big Three" at the American Airlines Arena, during which James declared that the Heat would win multiple championships. (Note: Attributed to multiple references:) Outside Miami, the spectacle was badly received, furthering negative perception of James.

Throughout the 2010–11 season, the media and opposing fans treated James as a villain. The Heat struggled to adjust to these new circumstances, going only 9–8 after 17 games. James later admitted the negativity made him play with an angrier demeanor. On December 2, James faced the Cavaliers in Cleveland for the first time since departing. He scored 38 points and led Miami to victory while being booed every time he touched the ball. The Heat turned their season around and finished as the East's second seed.

In the Eastern Conference Semifinals, the Heat played the Boston Celtics. In Game 5, James scored the Heat's last 10 points in a series-clinching win. After the buzzer, James knelt in an emotional moment, later telling reporters it was an extremely personal victory for him and the team. The Heat advanced to the Finals, where they lost to the Dallas Mavericks. James's Finals average of 17.8 points per game was a 9-point drop from the regular season, the largest drop-off in league history. Some analysts and commentators questioned the Heat's offensive hierarchy during the series, arguing that head coach Erik Spoelstra appeared to defer to Dwyane Wade at times rather than centering the offense around James.

==== 2011–2013: Back-to-back championships ====
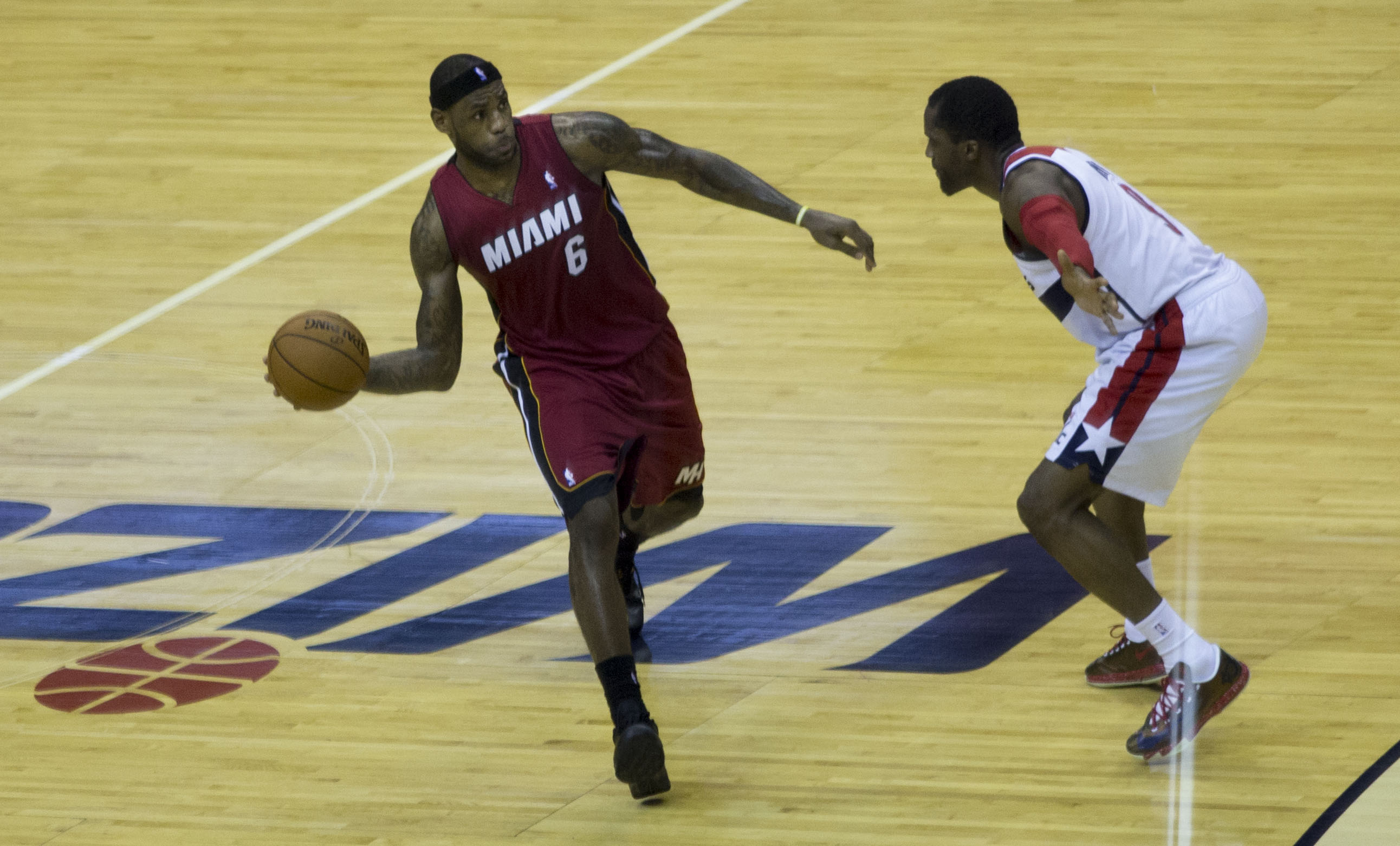
James bringing the ball up the court with the Heat in 2014

The 2011–12 season was delayed by a lockout. During that summer, James worked with Hakeem Olajuwon to improve his post up game. (Note: Attributed to multiple references:) As the start of the season approached, James set a goal for himself to leave behind the "villain role" that he had embraced, and said he was hoping to regain a sense of joy on the court. Miami began the year with a franchise-best 18–6 record, and James was named MVP for the third time. (Note: Attributed to multiple references:)

In the second round of the playoffs, Miami lost Bosh to an abdominal injury and found themselves trailing the Indiana Pacers two games to one. James responded with a 40-point, 18-rebound, and nine-assist outing in Game 4 to even the series. To compensate for Bosh's absence, the Heat embraced a small-ball lineup with James at power forward, which they retained after Bosh's return in the conference finals against the Celtics. Facing elimination in Game 6, James recorded 45 points and 15 rebounds to lead the Heat to victory in a "career-defining performance". Miami won Game 7 to advance to the Finals, earning them a matchup with the Oklahoma City Thunder. In Game 5, James registered a triple-double as the Heat defeated the Thunder for their second-ever championship and James's first. James was voted Finals MVP with averages of 28.6 points, 10.2 rebounds, and 7.4 assists. His full postseason run was ranked the second best in modern NBA history.

During January of the 2012–13 season, James became the youngest player in NBA history to score 20,000 career points. In February, he averaged 29.7 points and 7.8 assists while setting shooting efficiency records. The Heat began a 27-game winning streak, which is the third longest in NBA history, and James's performance was described as a "month for the ages". Miami finished with a franchise and league best 66–16 record, and James was named MVP for the fourth time, falling one vote shy of becoming the first player to win unanimously.

The Heat won the Eastern Conference Finals against the Pacers, then faced the Spurs in the Finals. James was criticized for his lack of aggressiveness and poor shot selection, as Miami fell behind 2–3. (Note: Attributed to multiple references:) In Game 6, James recorded his second triple-double of the series, including 16 fourth quarter points, to lead the Heat to a comeback victory. The Heat proceeded to win Game 7, marking their second consecutive championship. James was named Finals MVP for the second straight season.

==== 2013–2014: Final season in Miami ====
On March 3 of the 2013–14 season, James scored a career-high 61 points against the Charlotte Bobcats. He also set a record for the most three-point field goals made in a 60-point game. Miami earned their fourth consecutive Finals berth, again facing the Spurs. (Note: Attributed to multiple references:) In Game 2, James led the Heat to a series-tying victory with 35 points on a 64 percent shooting rate. San Antonio defeated the Heat in five games, ending Miami's quest for three consecutive championships.

=== Return to Cleveland (2014–2018) ===
In June 2014, James opted out of his contract with the Heat and became an unrestricted free agent. He returned to the Cavaliers, signing a two-year, $42 million contract, and switched back to the No. 23 jersey. (Note: Attributed to multiple references:) In contrast to his departure four years earlier, his announcement to return to Cleveland was well received. (Note: Attributed to multiple references:)

==== 2014–2016: Ending Cleveland's championship drought ====
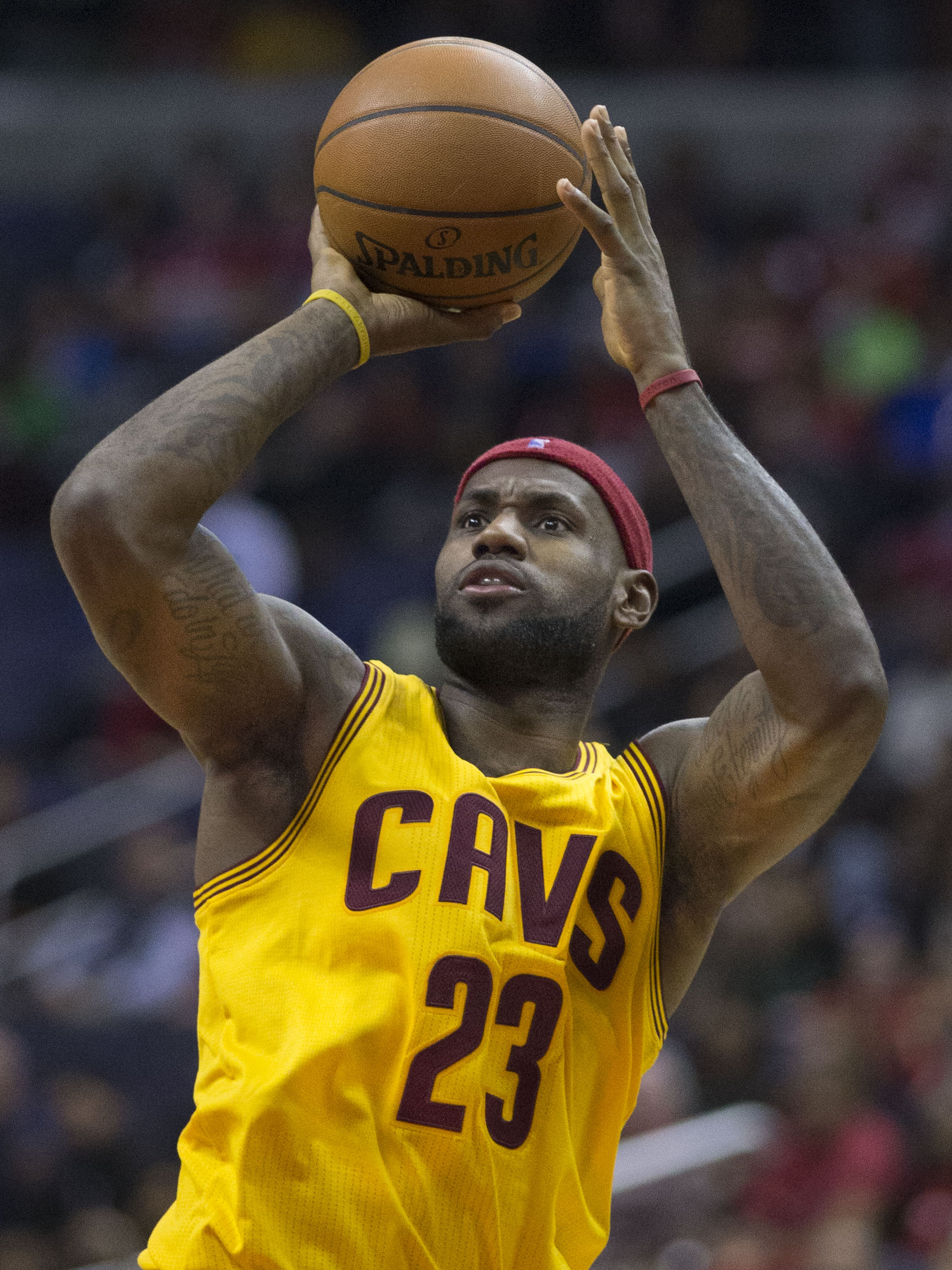
James takes a shot in November 2014. During that season, James became the Cavaliers' all-time assists leader.

In January of the 2014–15 season, James missed two weeks due to knee and back strains, which was the longest stretch of missed games in his career at the time. The Cavaliers advanced to the Finals against the Golden State Warriors, making James the first player since the 1960s to play in five consecutive Finals. Cleveland took a 2–1 series lead, but lost in six games.

During the 2015 offseason, James declined his $21.5 million player option and re-signed with Cleveland on a two-year, $47 million contract that carried a second year player option. During the 2015–16 season, there was speculation that James played a role in the firing of Cavaliers head coach David Blatt. Despite this distraction, Cleveland finished with 57 wins and the best record in the East. The Cavaliers advanced to the NBA Finals, losing only two games en route to a rematch with the Warriors, who were coming off a record-setting 73-win season.

To begin the series, Cleveland fell behind 3–1. James responded by registering 41-point games in Games 5 and 6, leading the Cavaliers to consecutive wins. In Game 7, he posted a triple-double and made a clutch block on the Warriors' Andre Iguodala as Cleveland claimed victory, becoming the first NBA team to come back from a 3–1 deficit in the Finals. The win also marked the city of Cleveland's first professional sports title in 52 years. James became the third player to record a triple-double in an NBA Finals Game 7, and averaged 29.7 points, 11.3 rebounds, 8.9 assists, 2.3 blocks, and 2.6 steals during the series. He was unanimously selected as the Finals MVP. During a White House ceremony honoring the Cavaliers for their victory, U.S. president Barack Obama praised James's work ethic, determination, selflessness and his "insistence on always making the right play."

==== 2016–2018: End of second stint in Cleveland ====
James opted out of his player option and re-signed with the Cavaliers on a three-year, $100 million contract, in which the final year was a player option. The 2016–17 season was marred by injuries and unexpected losses for the Cavaliers; James described it as one of the strangest years of his career. Cleveland finished the season as the East's second seed, with James averaging 26.4 points and career highs in rebounds (8.6), assists (8.7), and turnovers (4.1) per game.

In Game 3 of the first round of the playoffs, James led Cleveland to a comeback victory against the Pacers. In Game 5 of the Eastern Conference Finals against the Celtics, James scored 35 points and surpassed Michael Jordan as the NBA's all-time postseason scoring leader. The Cavaliers advanced to the NBA Finals for the third consecutive year, again facing the Warriors. In Game 4, James logged a triple-double of 31 points, 10 rebounds, and 11 assists, as Cleveland staved off elimination. With this performance, James passed Magic Johnson for the most NBA Finals triple-doubles in a career. The Cavaliers lost the Finals in five games, despite James's double-double in game 5. Averaging 33.6 points, 12.0 rebounds, and 10.0 assists in the series, James became the first player to average a triple-double in the Finals.

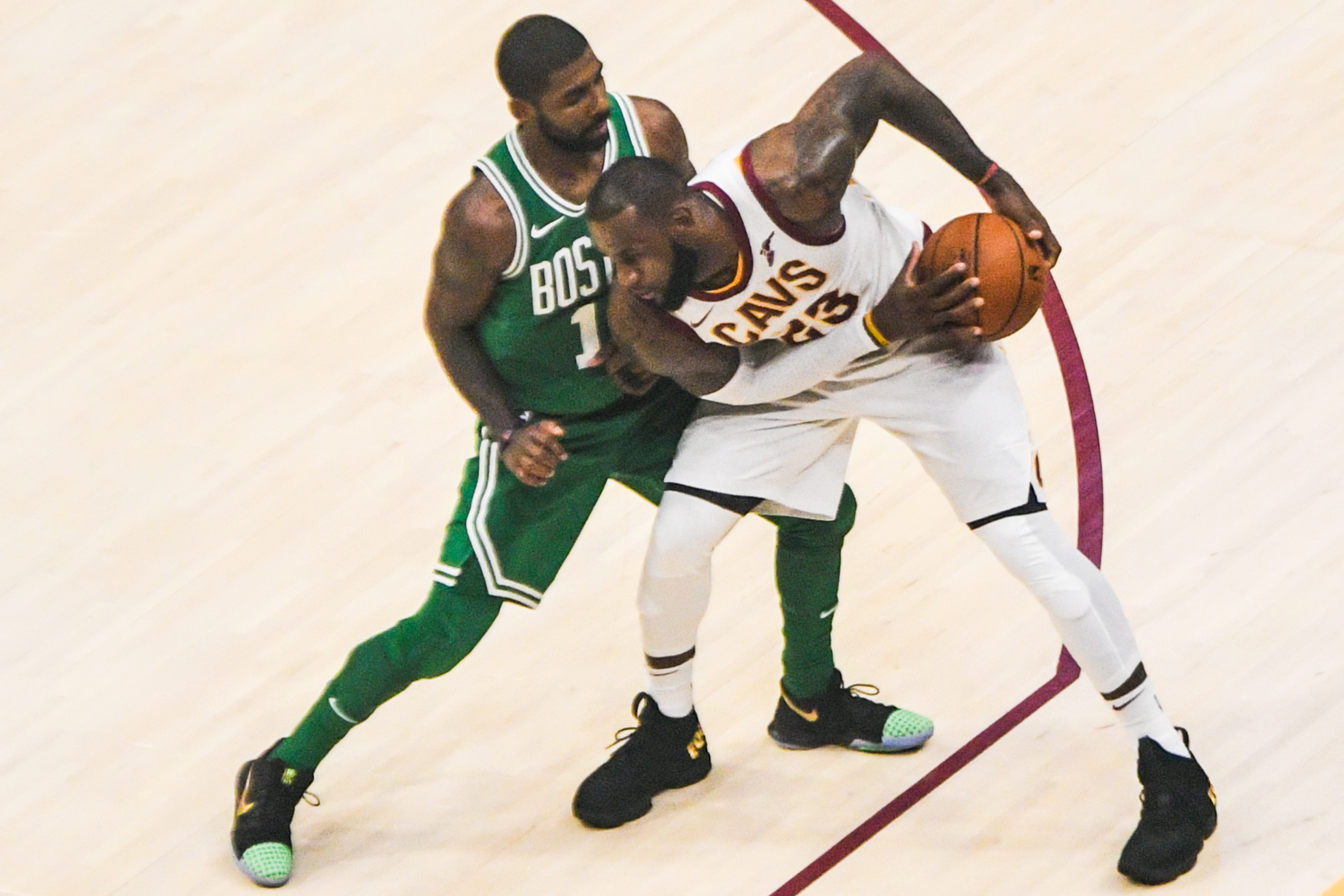
James protects the ball from Kyrie Irving in October 2017. The two were teammates in Cleveland for three seasons.

Before the 2017–18 season, the Cavaliers overhauled their roster by trading Irving to the Celtics, who requested the trade in part because he no longer wanted to play with James. After a slow start, Cleveland rebounded by winning 18 of 19 games. In a November 3 game, James scored 57 points, the second-highest point total of his career and a franchise record. Later in the season, James won his third All-Star Game MVP Award and set an NBA record of scoring in double digits for 867 straight games. (Note: Attributed to multiple references:)

In the Eastern Conference finals, the Cavaliers defeated the Celtics, giving James his eighth consecutive NBA Finals appearance and sending Cleveland to their fourth straight Finals against the Golden State Warriors. In Game 1, James scored a playoff career-high 51 points in a 124–114 overtime loss. Afterwards, he injured his hand punching a locker room wall, which hampered him for the remainder of the series. The Cavaliers lost in the first Finals sweep since 2007.

=== Los Angeles Lakers (2018–2026) ===
==== 2018–2019: Injury and playoff miss ====
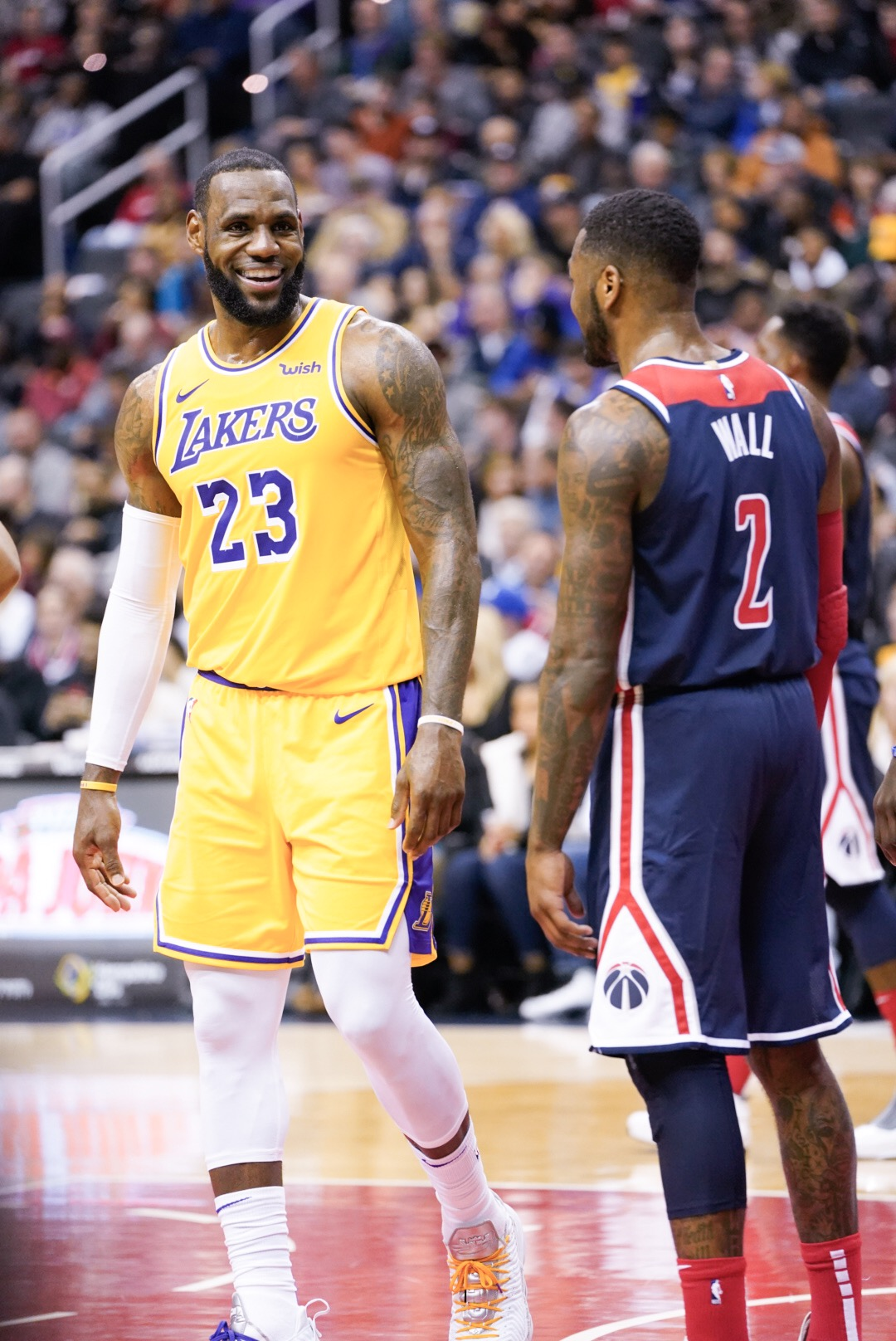
James during his first season with the Lakers in 2018

In June 2018, James opted out of his contract with the Cavaliers and became an unrestricted free agent. He signed with the Los Angeles Lakers on a four-year, $153.5 million contract. James's agent Rich Paul explained: "In 2010, when he went to Miami, it was about championships. In 2014, when he went back to Cleveland, it was about delivering on a promise. In 2018, it was just about doing what he wants to do." Reactions among Cleveland fans and coaches were more positive than during James's first departure, although ESPN reported that reactions from players, coaches, executives and agents throughout the NBA were mixed.

The Lakers hoped James would make them championship contenders. The team rounded out their roster with a controversial collection of playmakers and veterans, and started the 2018–19 season by recording only two wins in their first seven games. In November, they began a turnaround, which included James's highest-scoring game of the season. James suffered a groin injury after Christmas—the first major injury of his career—which caused him to miss 17 consecutive games. The Lakers fell out of playoff contention, marking the first time James missed the playoffs since 2005. (Note: Attributed to multiple references:) For the first time in twelve years, he did not make the All-NBA First Team.

==== 2019–2020: Fourth NBA championship ====
During the offseason, the Lakers traded several players to the New Orleans Pelicans for "big man" Anthony Davis. James moved to full-time point guard, and the Lakers opened the 2019–20 season with a 17–2 record, matching the best start in the team's history. On January 25, 2020, James achieved third place on the all-time regular season scoring list, surpassing former Lakers star Kobe Bryant a day before Bryant died in a helicopter crash. On January 31, James delivered an improvised eulogy in honor of Bryant, describing him as a "brother" and expressing a desire to continue Bryant's legacy. James ended the regular season—which was suspended due to the COVID-19 pandemic—as the league leader in assists for the first time in his career, averaging 10.2 assists per game. He earned a record 16th All-NBA Team selection as part of the First Team, extending his record First Team selections to 13.

The Lakers entered the playoffs as the top seed in the Western Conference and advanced to the Finals. In Game 5 against the Denver Nuggets, James helped clinch the series by scoring 38 points. The Lakers started strong in the Finals, winning the first two games against James's former team, the Miami Heat. In Game 5, James scored 40 points and had 13 rebounds and seven assists. The Lakers eliminated the Heat in Game 6, earning James his fourth NBA championship. With averages of 29.8 points, 11.8 rebounds, and 8.5 assists per game, James was named the Finals MVP, and became the only player to win the award with three different teams.

==== 2020–2021: Back-to-back chase ====
James signed a two-year, $85.7 million extension that kept him with the Lakers through the 2022–23 season. During the 2020–21 season, James became the first player in NBA history to score 10 points or more in 1,000 consecutive games, and the third player to score 35,000 career points. (Note: Attributed to multiple references:) He sprained his ankle in late March and missed 20 games, the longest absence of his career. (Note: Attributed to multiple references:) The season was his 17th consecutive season averaging at least 25 points per game, an NBA record. (Note: Attributed to multiple references:) In a play-in tournament to determine playoff seeds, the Lakers defeated the Warriors 103–100, with James posting a triple-double. (Note: Attributed to multiple references:) In the first round of the playoffs, the Lakers lost to the Phoenix Suns in six games, marking the first time James lost in the first round. (Note: Attributed to multiple references:) James made his 17th consecutive All-NBA Team selection, marking a new record for most selections. (Note: Attributed to multiple references:)

==== 2021–2022: First in the 10K-10K-10K club ====
For the 2021–22 season, James switched his jersey back to No. 6. He had meant to switch two years earlier—to allow Davis to wear No. 23—but Nike had a surplus of merchandise featuring James with No. 23, and so prevented him from making the switch. On November 21, in a game against the Pistons, James was ejected after getting into a scuffle with Isaiah Stewart. It was only the second time he was ejected from a game, and he was suspended for one game. In early December, James achieved his 100th triple-double, (Note: Attributed to multiple references:) and in February he surpassed Kareem Abdul-Jabbar for the most combined points scored in the regular season and playoffs. (Note: Attributed to multiple references:) James earned his 18th All-Star selection and was celebrated as a member of the NBA 75th Anniversary Team. At the 2022 NBA All-Star Game, James's team achieved its fifth consecutive All-Star victory. (Note: Attributed to multiple references:)

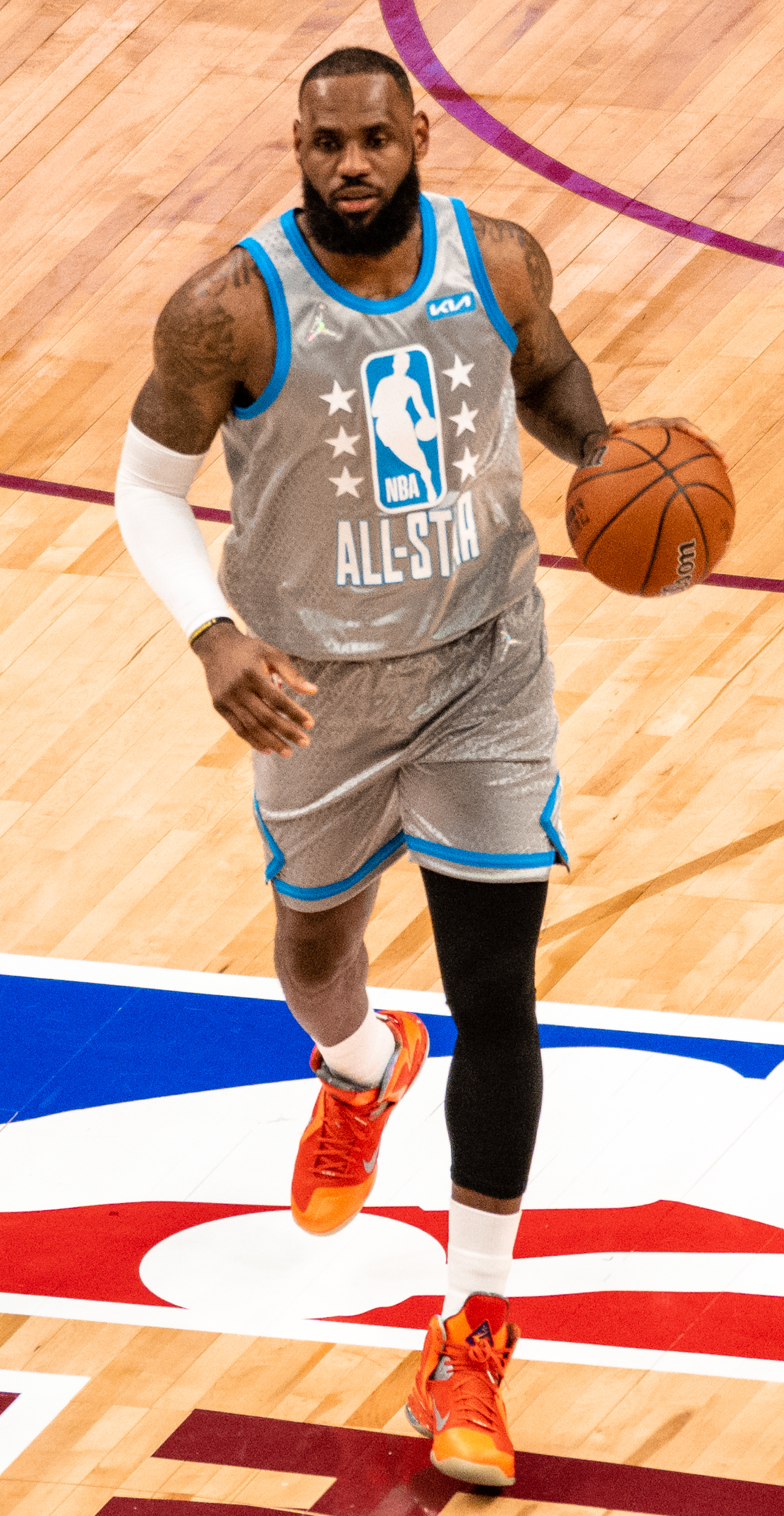
James at the 2022 NBA All-Star Game

In March, James recorded two 50-point games, becoming the oldest player to have multiple 50-point games in a season. (Note: Attributed to multiple references:) He recorded his 10,000th career assist, becoming the only player in NBA history to record at least 10,000 points, 10,000 rebounds, and 10,000 assists. James suffered an ankle injury in March, (Note: Attributed to multiple references:) and the Lakers were eliminated from playoff and play-in contention for the first time since 2019. James was named to the All-NBA Third Team for the second time; it was his 18th consecutive All-NBA Team selection, extending the record for most selections.

==== 2022–2023: All-time scoring record ====
In August 2022, James signed a two-year, $97 million contract extension with the Lakers, which had a player option in the second year. The contract brought his career earnings to $529 million, an NBA record. On December 13, James scored 33 points in a 122–118 overtime loss to the Celtics, surpassing Wilt Chamberlain for the second-most 30-point games in NBA history, at 516.

During January 2023, James recorded a string of accomplishments. He received his 66th Player of the Week award; became the second player in NBA history to reach 38,000 points; achieved his 100th career game with 40 or more points scored; became the first player with a 40-point game against every NBA team; was named as a starter at the 2023 NBA All-Star Game, tying Kareem Abdul-Jabbar's record for the most All-Star selections with 19; (Note: It was also James' 19th consecutive All-Star appearance) and became the first player in NBA history to post a triple-double in his 20th season. (Note: Attributed to multiple references:) On February 7, James passed Abdul-Jabbar as the all-time leading scorer in NBA history. The NBA stopped the game with 10.9 seconds left in the third quarter for an on-court ceremony, during which James gave a speech and received the game ball from Abdul-Jabbar. (Note: Attributed to multiple references:)

James sustained a foot injury in late February, which caused him to miss 13 games. (Note: Attributed to multiple references:) On April 2, he posted a triple-double during a 134–109 victory over the Houston Rockets, tying Jason Kidd for fourth place on the all-time triple-doubles list. James finished the regular season with averages of 28.9 points, 8.3 rebounds and 6.8 assists per game, becoming the oldest player in NBA history to average at least 25 points, five rebounds, and five assists in a season. In Game 4 of the first-round playoffs against the Memphis Grizzlies, James had 22 points, a playoff career-high 20 rebounds, and seven assists in a 117–111 overtime victory, marking his first game ever with both 20 points scored and 20 rebounds. He became the oldest player in league history with at least 20 points and 20 rebounds in a playoff game. In Game 6 of the Western Conference semifinals, James put up 30 points, nine rebounds, nine assists and two steals, in a 122–101 victory over the Warriors to lead the Lakers to the Western Conference finals. He also won his 41st playoff series, surpassing Derek Fisher for the most playoff series wins in NBA history. In the Western Conference finals, the Lakers were swept by the Nuggets, who would go on to win the championship.

==== 2023–2024: NBA Cup MVP and 40K points ====
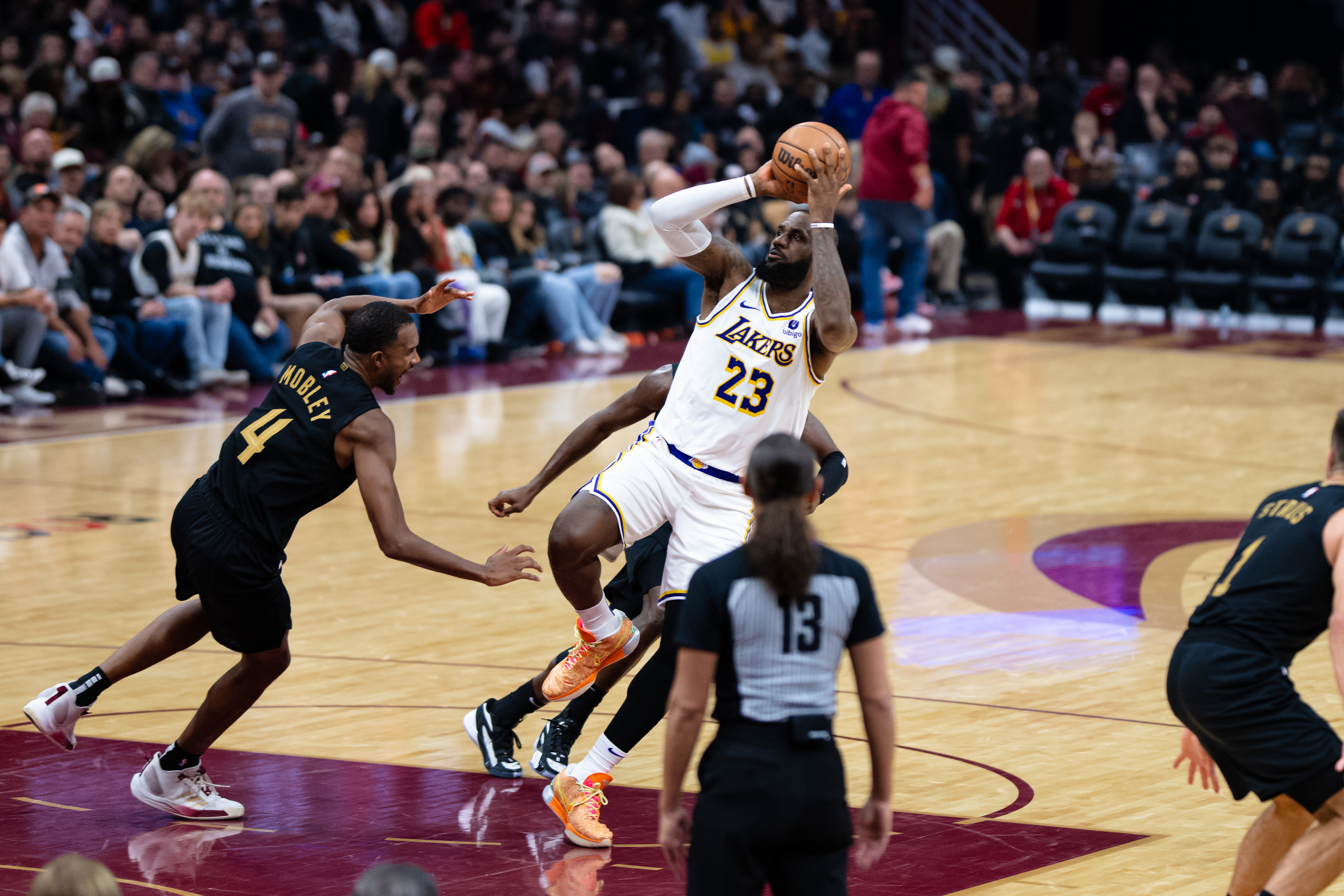
James shooting a fadeaway against the Cavaliers in Cleveland in 2023

For the 2023–24 season, James switched back to jersey No. 23 from No. 6 in honor of Bill Russell, who had died the previous year and whose No. 6 jersey had been retired league-wide. With the retirements of Udonis Haslem and Andre Iguodala, James became the NBA's oldest active player. On November 15, James logged 28 points, 10 rebounds and 11 assists in a 125–110 loss to the Sacramento Kings, becoming the second-oldest player to record a triple-double. In November, James became the first player in NBA history to reach 5,000 career turnovers. On November 27, in a 138–94 loss to the Philadelphia 76ers, James surpassed Kareem Abdul-Jabbar to become the player with the most minutes played in NBA games during the regular season and playoffs. The 44-point loss was the worst of James's career. On December 9, James and the Lakers won the inaugural NBA In-Season Tournament, with James receiving the Tournament MVP award and being selected to the All-Tournament team.

On January 25, 2024, James was named an All-Star starter for the 2024 NBA All-Star Game, marking his 20th NBA All-Star selection, surpassing Abdul-Jabbar for the most All-Star selections. On February 28, James led the Lakers to a 116–112 comeback win against the Clippers. Trailing by 21 points entering the fourth quarter, he outscored the Clippers by himself 19–16 in the final quarter, going 5-for-8 from three-point range. It was the largest fourth-quarter comeback of James's career. Three days later, James became the first player in NBA history to reach 40,000 career points. On March 16, he scored a season-high 40 points in a loss to the Warriors. On March 31, he put up 40 points on a career-high nine 3-pointers in a 116–104 victory over the Brooklyn Nets. On April 2, James passed Oscar Schmidt to become the world's all-time scoring leader in basketball history. James finished his 21st season in the NBA averaging 25.7 points, 8.3 assists and 7.3 rebounds a game. He shot 54% from the field and a career-high 41% from 3-point range.

==== 2024–2025: First father-son duo ====
On July 6, 2024, James re-signed with the Lakers on a two-year, $104 million contract which carried a no-trade clause and had a player option in the second year. James's son Bronny had been drafted 55th by the Lakers; on October 22, in a game against the Minnesota Timberwolves, James and Bronny became the first father-son duo to play in an NBA game together. (Note: Attributed to multiple references:) On November 13, James logged a triple-double against the Grizzlies, setting a new record for the oldest player to record a triple-double in three consecutive games. Two days later, he recorded his fourth consecutive triple-double of the season, breaking his own record for the most consecutive triple-doubles. On December 1, James became only the second player (after Kareem Abdul-Jabbar) to score 15,000 career field goals, and on December 19 he passed Abdul-Jabbar for the most regular season minutes played in a career.

On January 3, 2025, James put up 30 points and eight assists in a 119–102 win over the Hawks, surpassing Michael Jordan for the most 30-point regular season games in NBA history. On February 6, James recorded a season-high 42 points in a win over the Warriors, making James the oldest player to score 40 or more points in a game. James was selected for his 21st NBA All-Star Game, but missed the game due to foot and ankle soreness, which ended his streak of 20 consecutive All-Star game starts. On March 4, James surpassed 50,000 career points across the regular season and playoffs. Four days later, he experienced a groin injury, which kept him off the court for seven games. On March 26, he scored 13 points and a game-winning buzzer-beater in a 120–119 victory against the Pacers. The Lakers were eliminated in the first round of the playoffs for the second straight year. In the deciding game 5 loss to the Timberwolves, James sprained the medial collateral ligament in his left knee. He spent the next several months focused on recovery in preparation for the Lakers' September training camp.

==== 2025–2026: Final season in Los Angeles ====
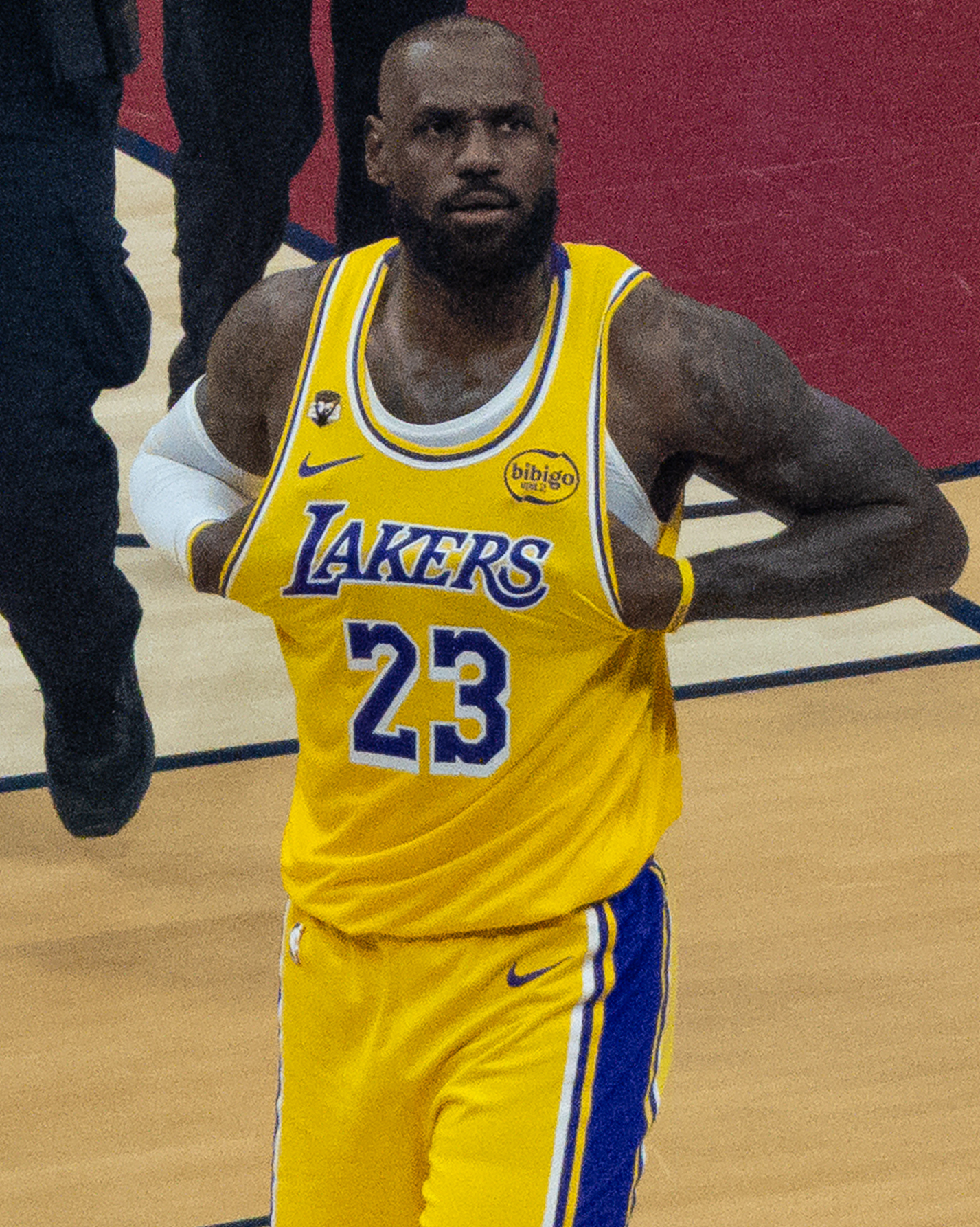
James with the Los Angeles Lakers in 2026

After missing the Lakers' first 14 games due to sciatica, James made his season debut on November 18 in a 140–126 win over the Utah Jazz. He became the first player to play in 23 NBA seasons. On December 4, in a 123–120 win over the Toronto Raptors, James assisted on Rui Hachimura's game-winning, buzzer-beating 3-pointer, finishing the game with eight points. This ended his record-making streak of 1,297 consecutive games with at least 10 points. James passed Kobe Bryant to become the player with the most double-doubles with 30+ points in Lakers franchise history.

After sitting out a game against the San Antonio Spurs on February 10, James became ineligible from receiving any regular season awards by missing his 18th game of the season. As a result, his record streak of 21 consecutive All-NBA Team selections came to an end. On February 12, he became the oldest player in NBA history to post a triple-double, recording 28 points, 12 assists, and 10 rebounds in a victory over the Dallas Mavericks. On February 28, James reached 1,000 three-pointers made as a Laker. On March 5, in a game against the Denver Nuggets, James made his 15,838th career field goal and surpassed Kareem Abdul-Jabbar for the most career field goals made in NBA history. On March 21, James played his 1,612th career game, passing Robert Parish to become the all-time leader in career games played. Ten days later, James surpassed Abdul-Jabbar for the most career wins in NBA history, with 1,229. On April 10, James recorded his 12,000th career assist in a game against the Phoenix Suns, joining Jason Kidd, Chris Paul, and John Stockton as the only players to record at least 12,000 career assists in NBA history. On May 7, he became the first NBA player to play in 300 playoff games. On June 30, it was announced that James had informed the Lakers that he would not be returning to the team for the 2026–27 season.

=== Philadelphia 76ers (2026–present) ===
On July 24, 2026, James announced on X that he would be signing with the Philadelphia 76ers, calling it his "last decision". Following the announcement, Pennsylvania governor Josh Shapiro declared July 24 "LeBron James Day" throughout the state. Two days later, James signed a 2-year, $8 million contract with the team, which includes a player option. He made his debut with the 76ers on October 20, recording 14 points, nine rebounds, and seven assists in a 106–100 win over the New York Knicks. On November 4, James became the first player in NBA history to score 16,000 regular-season field goals over the course of his career. On November 15, he reached 12,092 career assists during a 131–124 win over the Indiana Pacers, surpassing Jason Kidd to become third in career assists.

== National team career ==
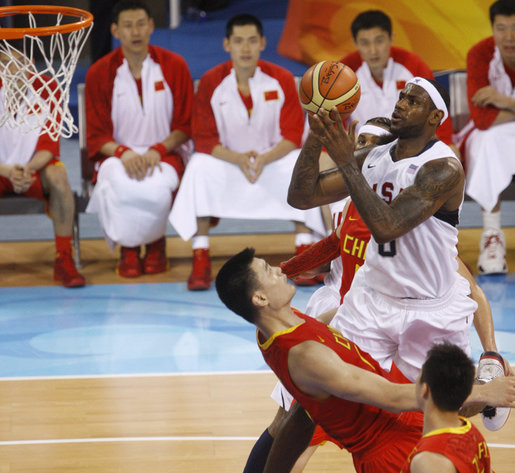
James attempting a shot over China's Yao Ming at the 2008 Summer Olympics

As a 19-year-old rookie, James made his debut for the United States national team at the 2004 Olympics in Athens, Greece, although he spent most of the event on the bench. Team USA finished with a bronze medal, becoming the first U.S. basketball team to return home without a gold medal since the NBA started allowing active players to participate in the Olympics. James felt he was not given "a fair opportunity to play".

At the 2006 FIBA World Championship in Japan, James took on a greater role for Team USA, averaging 13.9 points, 4.8 rebounds, and 4.1 assists per game as co-captain. The team finished the tournament with an 8–1 record, winning another bronze medal. During this time, James was known for his disrespectful attitude toward the national team's staff, coaches and players. While assembling the 2008 Olympic squad, Team USA managing director Jerry Colangelo and coach Mike Krzyzewski told James he could only play if he improved his attitude, and James complied. Colangelo said that James matured significantly as both a player and a person as a result of the ultimatum. (Note: Attributed to multiple references:)

At the FIBA Americas Championship 2007, James put up 31 points against Argentina in the championship game, the most ever by an American in an Olympic qualifier. Team USA went 10–0, winning the championship and qualifying for the 2008 Olympics in Beijing, where they went undefeated and won the gold medal.

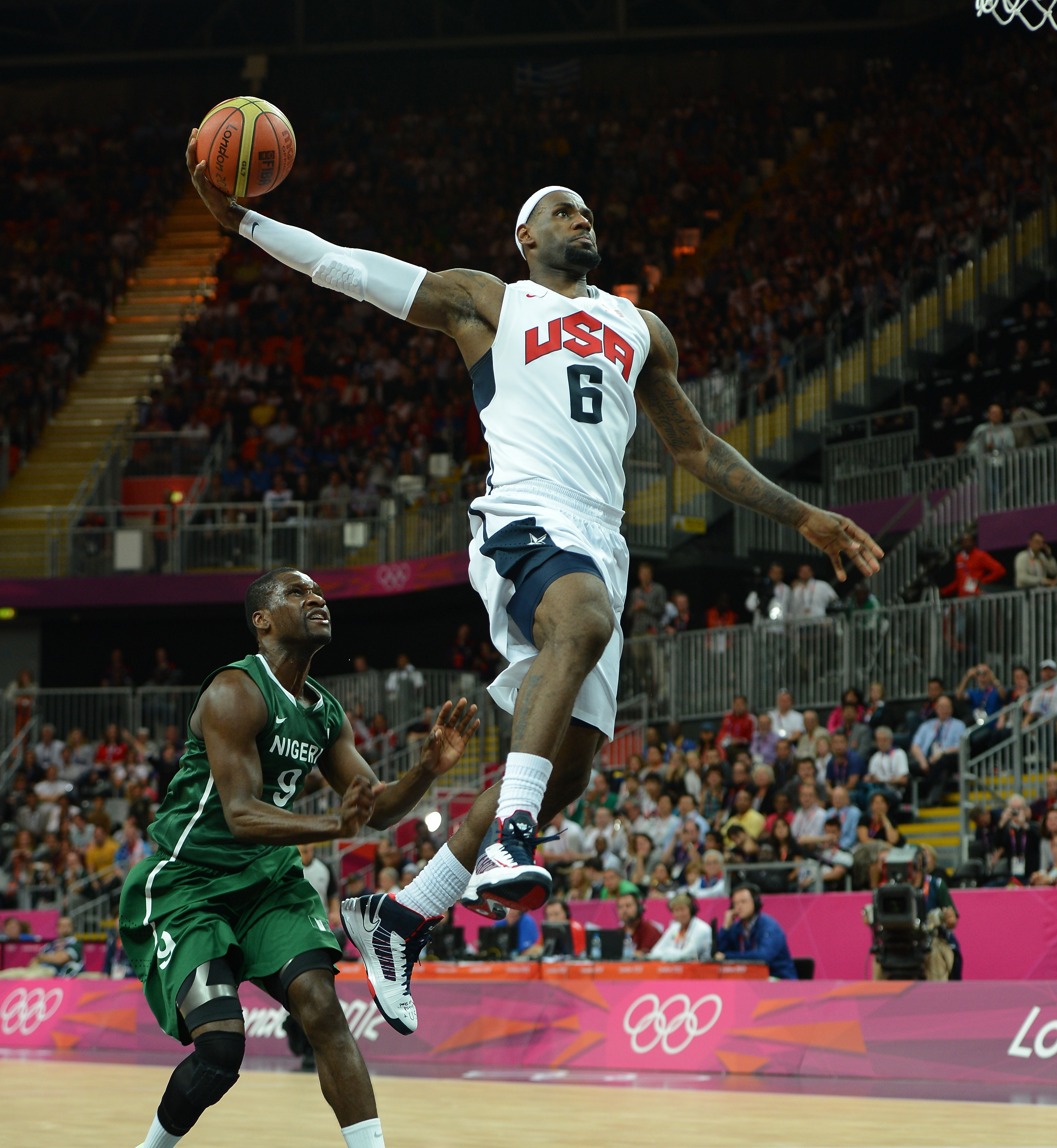
James attempting a dunk at the 2012 Summer Olympics

James did not play at the 2010 FIBA World Championship but became the leader of Team USA ahead of the 2012 Olympics in London. During a game against Australia, he recorded the first triple-double in U.S. Olympic basketball history with 11 points, 14 rebounds, and 12 assists. (Note: Assists were recorded as an official Olympic statistic starting in 1976.) Team USA won the gold medal, again defeating Spain in the final game. James contributed 19 points in the victory, becoming the all-time leading scorer in U.S. men's basketball history. He became the second player, alongside Michael Jordan, to win an NBA MVP award, NBA championship, NBA Finals MVP, and Olympic gold medal in the same year.

After a 12-year hiatus from the Olympics, James joined the 2024 Olympic squad in Paris as team captain at 39 years old. He was one of two Team USA flag-bearers for the opening ceremony of the games, becoming the first male basketball player to receive the honor. James led the team in rebounds and assists, and recorded his second Olympic triple double, becoming the first player in Olympic history with two triple doubles. Team USA won their fifth straight gold medal, defeating France 98–87 in the final game. With averages of 14.2 points, 6.8 rebounds and 8.5 assists in the tournament, James was named the FIBA Men's Olympics MVP and was selected to the FIBA Men's Olympics All-Star Five. James became the third male basketball player to win three gold medals at the Olympics.

== Player profile ==
Standing 6 feet 9 inches (2.06 m) tall and weighing 250 pounds (113 kg), James has played the majority of his career at the small forward and power forward positions, but he has also been deployed at other positions when necessary. His playing style, which is athletic and versatile, has drawn comparisons to Basketball Hall of Fame players Oscar Robertson, Magic Johnson and Michael Jordan. (Note: Attributed to multiple references:)

=== Offense ===
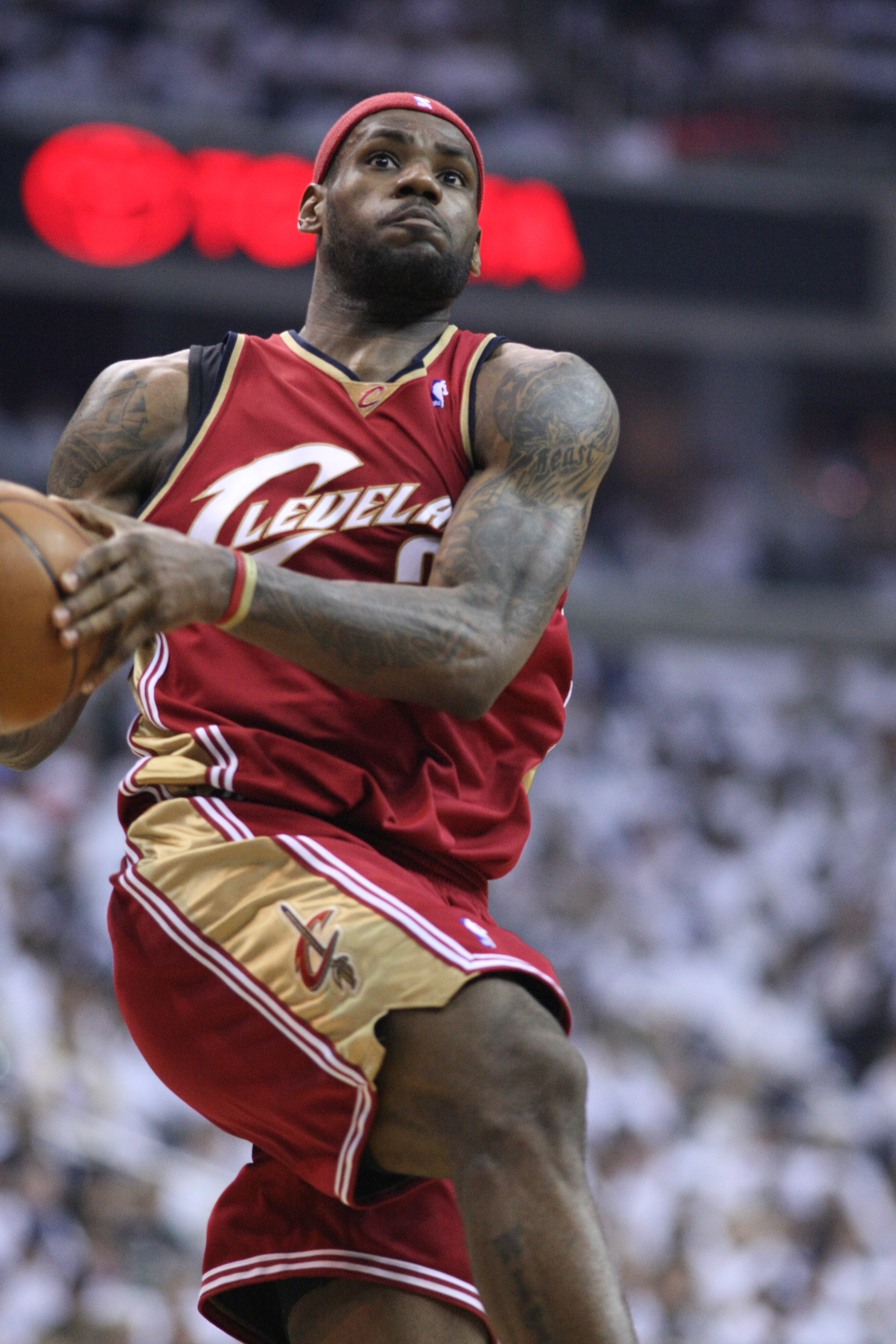
James drives to the basket in March 2008. A deft finisher, he led the NBA in scoring and shooting percentage at the rim in 2013.

James led the Cavaliers in scoring as an 18-year-old rookie, and became the youngest player to score 30,000 career points. During his first stint in Cleveland, James was primarily used as an on-ball point forward, and although his shooting tendencies were perimeter-oriented, he established himself as one of the best slashers and finishers in basketball. His combination of speed and size often created matchup problems for opposing teams because James was capable of charging past larger defenders and overpowering smaller ones. James was frequently criticized for not having a reliable jump shot or post game. Teams would try to exploit these weaknesses by forcing him to settle for three-pointers and long two-pointers, a strategy famously used by Spurs coach Gregg Popovich in the 2007 Finals, during which James scored on only 36 percent of his two-point field goal attempts, and on only 20 percent of his three-point attempts.

In Miami, Heat coach Erik Spoelstra changed James's role to a more unconventional one. James spent more time in the post and improved his shot selection and accuracy on jump shots. He also learned how to work as an off-ball cutter in the Heat's "pass-happy" offense. With these improvements, James's overall scoring efficiency rose significantly. During this time, ESPN's Tom Haberstroh called James's free-throw shooting his biggest weakness.

In 2015 and 2016, James began to experience subtle age-related declines in productivity, posting his lowest scoring averages since his rookie season. His shooting also temporarily regressed, and he briefly ranked as the NBA's worst high-volume shooter from outside the key. Despite these changes, he remained an elite offensive player who beat defenses with body control, strength, and varying attack speeds.

For most of his career, James has controlled the offense as the primary ball handler on his team. His playmaking ability is generally considered one of his premier skills, and some analysts rank him among the greatest passers in NBA history. By exploiting his size, vision, and the attention he garners from opposing defenses, he creates easy points for his teammates with precise assists. James executes unconventional passes, including after leaving his feet and through defensive traffic. His uncanny tendency to find an open player has pushed opposing teams to incorporate elements of zone defense into their strategies. Early in his career, James was criticized for overpassing in pressure situations, in particular for passing instead of shooting in the waning seconds of close games; however, as his career progressed, James's clutch performance was viewed more favorably.

=== Defense ===
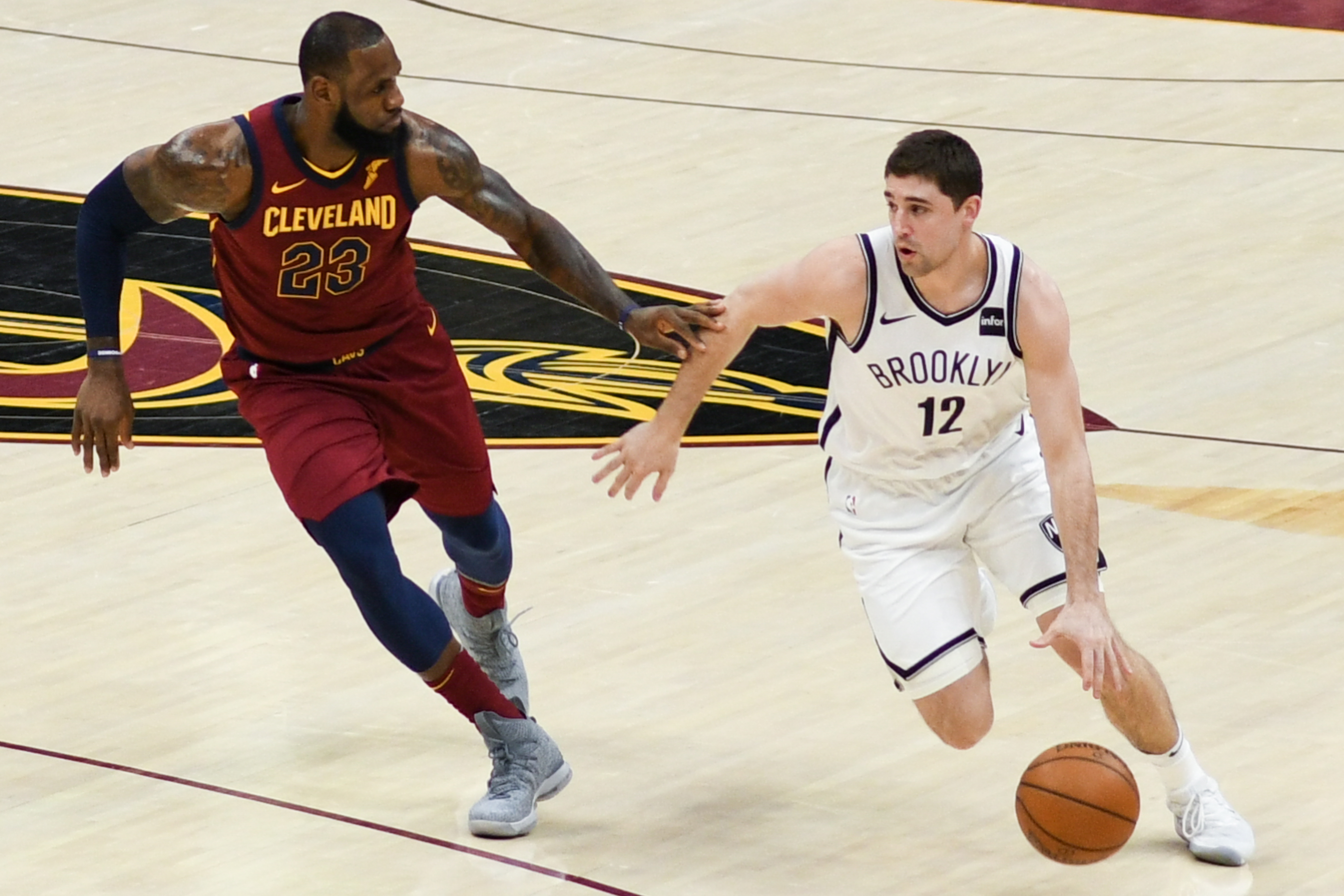
James defending against Joe Harris in February 2018

At the beginning of his NBA career, James was considered a poor defensive player, but he improved steadily over the years. In 2009, he demonstrated proficiency at the chase-down block. In Miami, he developed into a more versatile defensive player, and the Heat relied on him to guard all five positions. Between 2012 and 2016, he was ranked among the top three defenders in the NBA by general managers, and was named the best perimeter defender in the league ahead of the 2014–15 season. Along with Shane Battier and Dwyane Wade, Miami used James in an ultra-aggressive defensive scheme, with James cheating off the ball to help out inside or to get into rebounding position. Beginning in 2014, some analysts saw a regression in his defensive impact, stemming from a lack of effort and expected age-related declines. During his second stint in Cleveland, James's defense progressively declined. After missed drives on offense, he often dawdled back on defense while complaining to the referees; he provided less help off the ball, and was less aggressive in switching. James himself admitted to taking plays off at times, referring to this approach as "chill mode". He eventually developed a reputation for raising his defensive impact in the playoffs, which some analysts referred to as "Playoff LeBron".

== Legacy ==
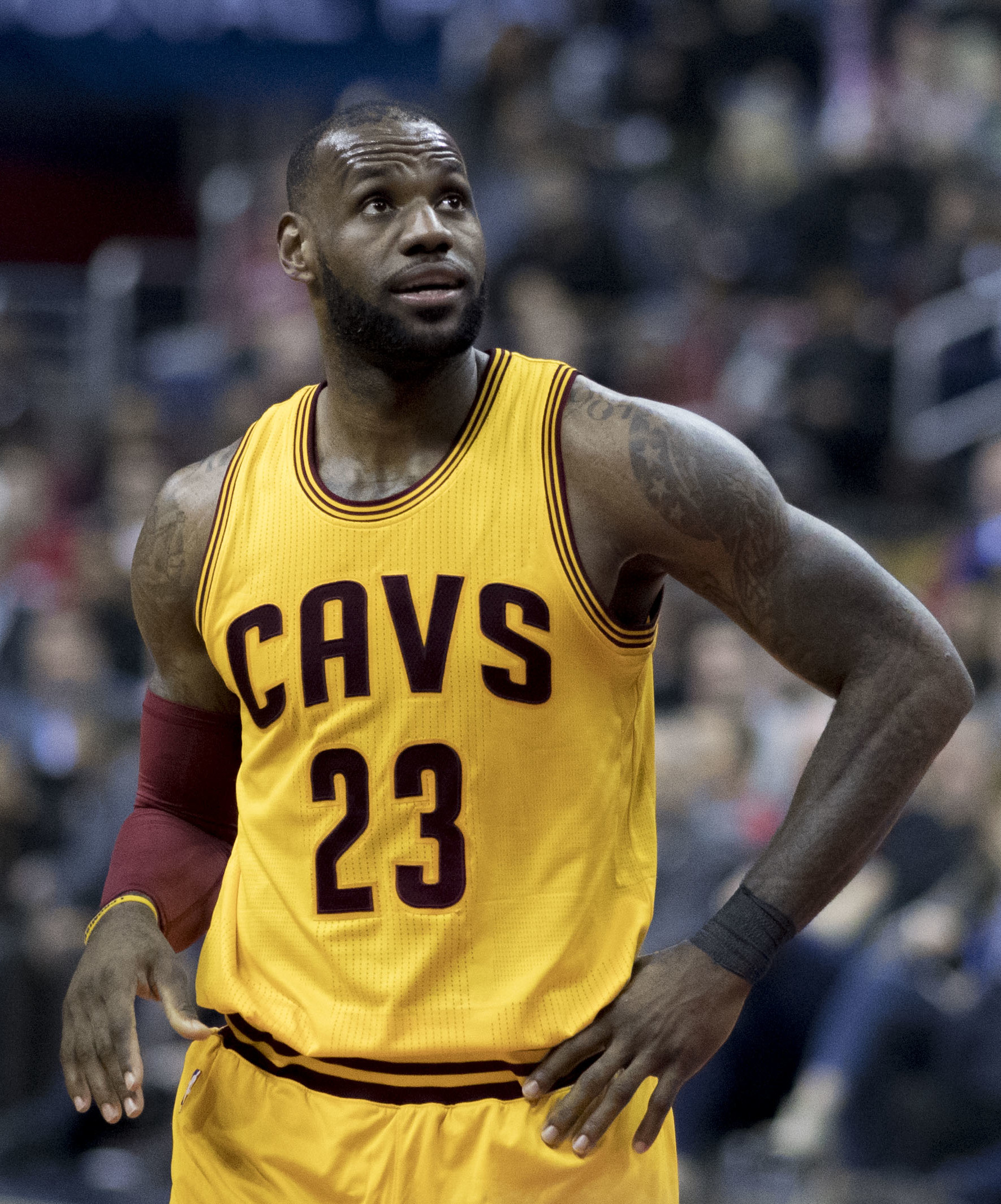
James with the Cavaliers in 2017. According to NBA analyst Brian Windhorst, who has covered James since high school, "No one has ever had as much hype as James has had to live up to, and James has delivered on every last drop."

James left high school as one of the most hyped prospects in NBA history. (Note: See Ryan Jones, Jay Bilas, Chris Broussard, Sam Smith, and Chad Ford.) Upon entering the league, he made an immediate impact and was voted Rookie of the Year in his debut season. As of 2024, James has been named to 21 All-NBA Teams, including 13 times to the First Team, which are both NBA records. His four MVP awards are matched only by Michael Jordan, Kareem Abdul-Jabbar, Wilt Chamberlain, and Bill Russell; James and Russell are the only players to win four MVP awards in a five-year span. James has also won four Finals MVP Awards, which is the second-most all-time, and earned All-Defensive honors every season from 2009 to 2014. While James has never won the Defensive Player of the Year Award, he has finished second in the voting twice and lists it among his goals. His teams have appeared in the Finals ten times and won four championships; his 10 Finals appearances are tied for third all-time. (Note: Tied with Abdul-Jabbar behind Bill Russell (12) and Sam Jones (11) of the Celtics) Some analysts have criticized him for not having a better Finals record, while others have countered that James usually performed well but his team was defeated by superior competition. (Note: Attributed to multiple references:)

Based on his career longevity and on-court performances, sports publications have regarded James as one of the greatest basketball players in history, and he is considered by many to be the greatest basketball player of all time. (Note: See Sports Illustrated (ranked 5th in 2016), ESPN (ranked 3rd in 2016 and 2nd in 2020), CBS Sports (ranked 2nd in 2017), Fox Sports (ranked 2nd in 2017), Slam (ranked 2nd in 2018), and Bleacher Report (ranked 2nd in 2019). For examples of commentators arguing that James is the greatest player of all time, see The Guardian (2016) and Sports Illustrated (2023). The Athletic's 2024 anonymous poll of NBA players found that James received 42.1% of the votes for greatest player of all time, finishing second to Michael Jordan, who received 45.9%. Further examples include NBC Sports (2018) and the Los Angeles Times (2023), both of which published commentary arguing that James is the greatest basketball player of all time.) He was named the Associated Press Male Athlete of the Decade for the 2010s. His high rankings have resulted in frequent debates about whether James or Michael Jordan is the greatest player ever. (Note: Various news outlets have commented on James being considered the greatest basketball player of all time, and whether or not he has surpassed Jordan as the greatest: Posnanski, Joe (June 23, 2016). "The great debate: Would you rather have LeBron James or Michael Jordan?". NBC Sports. Archived from the original on June 24, 2016.; Ryan, Bob (May 13, 2017). "Who's the GOAT, Michael or LeBron?". The Boston Globe.; Pelton, Kevin (May 10, 2018). "LeBron or MJ? How the King is settling the GOAT debate". ESPN.; Botkin, Brad (January 2, 2019). "LeBron James had at least one thing right when he declared himself the greatest player of all time". CBS Sports.; Olivieri, Anthony (February 14, 2019). "GOATs on GOATs: LeBron and MJ in their own words through the years". ESPN.; Davis, Scott (March 18, 2019). "Most Americans think Michael Jordan is the 'GOAT' over LeBron James, and it's not even close". Business Insider.; Lowe, Zach (October 12, 2020). "LeBron James vs. Michael Jordan: Why the GOAT debate is different now". ESPN.) In a 2016 interview with Sports Illustrated, James said he was hoping to surpass Jordan as the greatest player. In February 2018, The Ringer spent an entire week devoted to both players, with Bill Simmons ultimately concluding that Jordan was still ahead. James has ranked second behind Jordan in polls, the results of which show a strong correlation with the age of respondents, as older voters more often choose Jordan. (Note: Attributed to multiple references:) Business Insider stated that the data "would suggest that younger, more-engaged NBA fans lean toward James, as he's still playing" while older generations "who watched Jordan play and tune in less today lean toward Jordan." Referring to James as the best challenger to Jordan's status as the greatest player, Sam Quinn of CBS Sports stated that "in the rings-obsessed basketball discourse", Jordan having more titles and an "unblemished Finals record holds significant weight".

In addition to praising James's on-court accomplishments, analysts have also noted his influence on player empowerment throughout the NBA, which stemmed from his willingness to change teams during free agency. Ben Golliver of The Washington Post said that James's move to the Heat in 2010 "defined a decade of player movement", and that he "fundamentally flipped the power balance between stars and their organizations." Players have also remarked on his influence, such as Warriors forward Draymond Green, who reflected: "We've taken control of our destiny. And I think a lot of people hate that ... I think the doors that he's opened for athletes and especially basketball players is his biggest accomplishment." Multiple current and former NBA players have suggested James's free agency decisions catalyzed the league-wide trend in "superteams" in the 21st century. (Note: Attributed to multiple references:)

=== Public image ===
James is often considered by fellow NBA players and the media to be the "face of the NBA", frequently alongside Golden State Warriors superstar Stephen Curry. In 2014, James reportedly asked NBA commissioner Adam Silver to increase the duration of the All-Star break, and it was extended the following season. On February 13, 2015, James was elected the first vice president of the National Basketball Players Association (NBPA). Throughout the 2010s, James was usually ranked as the best player in the NBA each season by ESPN and Sports Illustrated.

Throughout his career, James has been ranked by Forbes as one of the world's most influential athletes, (Note: Such as in 2010 and 2013) and has been listed by Time as one of the 100 most influential people in the world. During his first stint with the Cavaliers, James was adored by local fans, and Sherwin-Williams displayed a giant Nike-produced banner of James at its world headquarters. Despite their affection for James, some Cleveland fans were irritated when he wore a Yankees cap at a Cleveland Indians baseball game against the New York Yankees. Following his actions during the 2010 free agency period and The Decision, James was listed as one of the most disliked athletes in the United States. By 2013, his image had mostly recovered and he was reported by ESPN as the most popular player in the NBA for the second time in his career. In 2014, James was named the most popular male athlete in America by the Harris Poll. He has led the league in jersey sales six times. As of June 2023, James is the most followed basketball player on Instagram, with over 155 million followers.

Critics noted similarities between the April 2008 Vogue cover featuring James and Gisele Bündchen and the World War I Destroy This Mad Brute poster.

Memorabilia associated with James is highly sought after; two of James's rookie cards are among the most expensive basketball cards ever sold at auction, with one selling for $1.8 million in July 2020. All jerseys worn in the 2020 NBA All-Star Game were auctioned by the NBA and NBPA to raise funds for charity; James's jersey sold for $630,000, setting a record for a modern-day sports jersey.

In March 2008, James was featured on the cover of Vogue magazine with Gisele Bündchen. ESPN columnist Jemele Hill considered the cover "distasteful", noting similarities between it and images of King Kong capturing a fair-skinned love interest. Other critics echoed Hill's sentiments and accused the magazine of creating imagery that associates black men with aggressive animals. (Note: Attributed to multiple references:)

A biography of James, titled LeBron, was published on April 11, 2023, by Jeff Benedict. The book was based on three years of research and more than 250 interviews. In 2025, Mattel announced that it was adding a Ken doll modeled after James to its Barbie toy line. The doll is an inch taller than a standard Ken doll. The same year, James was named an honorary co-chair of the Met Gala in Manhattan, but he did not attend due to a knee injury. (Note: Attributed to multiple references:)

== Media and business interests ==
=== Endorsements ===
Large Nike-sponsored billboard featuring James across from the Cavaliers' stadium in downtown Cleveland, October 2016

James has signed numerous endorsement contracts, including with AT&T, Audemars Piguet, Beats by Dre, Blaze Pizza, Coca-Cola, Dunkin' Brands, Intel, Kia, McDonald's, Nike, PepsiCo, State Farm, and Taco Bell. Coming out of high school, James was the subject of a three-way bidding war among Nike, Reebok, and Adidas; he eventually signed a seven-year deal with Nike in May 2003 for approximately $90 million. James's signature Nike shoes have been a successful product.

In 2011, Fenway Sports Group became the sole global marketer of James's rights; as part of the deal, James was granted a minority stake in the English Premier League soccer club Liverpool. That same year, James co-founded the designer retail store UNKNWN in Miami. When Apple acquired Beats Electronics in 2014, James earned more than $30 million through the sale of his stake in the company. James has been listed as one of the richest celebrities, and was the first active NBA player to become a billionaire. In 2013, he surpassed Kobe Bryant as the highest paid basketball player in the world, with earnings of $56.5 million. In 2015, James was ranked the sixth highest earning athlete, and in 2016 was ranked the third highest.

During Super Bowl LVI in 2022, a Crypto.com commercial depicted James offering advice to a CGI version of his younger self. The commercial, which was produced by James's SpringHill Company, inspired a series of internet memes about possible advice James could have offered. Crypto subsequently distributed 5,550 non-fungible tokens featuring James to randomly-selected recipients who scanned a QR code in the commercial.

=== Entertainment ===
James hosted the 33rd-season premiere of Saturday Night Live in 2007, and co-hosted the 2007 ESPY Awards with Jimmy Kimmel. In 2012, James had a cameo role on the HBO series Entourage, and in 2015 he appeared as himself in the Judd Apatow film Trainwreck. (Note: Attributed to multiple references:) Also in 2015, James's digital video company Uninterrupted raised $15.8 million from Warner Bros. Entertainment and Turner Sports to expand its efforts to bring athlete-created content to fans. Uninterrupted is hosted on the website Bleacher Report and has been used by athletes such as Rob Gronkowski and Richard Sherman. In 2017, Uninterrupted produced the documentary The Carter Effect, which was screened at the Toronto International Film Festival.

James and his business partner Maverick Carter own the production company SpringHill Entertainment. The company's first project was the documentary More Than a Game (2009), which chronicled James's high school years. Series produced by SpringHill include the game show The Wall, the sports documentary series Becoming, the sitcom Survivor's Remorse, and the animated web series The LeBrons. In 2016, CNBC aired a reality series hosted by James called Cleveland Hustles, which featured aspiring entrepreneurs competing to open businesses under the mentorship of a Cleveland investor. In 2023, SpringHill and Warner Bros. released a reboot of the House Party film series, which contains a cameo by James.

James was the executive producer of rapper 2 Chainz's 2019 album Rap or Go to the League. A press release said the album celebrates "black excellence" while challenging "the notion that the only way out of the inner city is either to become a rapper or a ball player." In June 2022, it was announced that James was launching a media company, Hana Kuma, in partnership with the professional tennis player Naomi Osaka and Maverick Carter.

In March 2024, James and JJ Redick launched a podcast called Mind the Game, where the two have "pure conversations about basketball." (Note: Attributed to multiple references:) The podcast was suspended after Redick was hired as head coach for the Los Angeles Lakers in June 2024. In March 2025, a second season was announced with Steve Nash replacing Redick as James's co-host.

=== Investments and other ventures ===
In 2012, James, Maverick Carter and Paul Wachter made an investment of less than $1 million in the Pasadena-based fast casual chain Blaze Pizza; their investment had grown to $25 million by 2017. James later became a spokesman for the company and began appearing in advertisements after ending his contract with McDonald's.

James partnered with Arnold Schwarzenegger in 2018 to found Ladder, a company that developed nutritional supplements to help athletes with severe cramps, which James experienced during the 2014 NBA Finals.

During the 2019 offseason, James filed for a trademark on the term "Taco Tuesday" for use in downloadable audio and visual works, podcasts, social media, online marketing, and entertainment services. James had used the term on Instagram to refer to his family's taco dinners. The request was denied by the United States Patent and Trademark Office, stating that "Taco Tuesday" was "a commonplace term, message or expression widely used by a variety of sources that merely conveys an ordinary, familiar, well-recognized concept or sentiment." In November 2020, James became an angel investor of the tequila and mezcal company Lobos 1707.

After personal frustration with comments on the Black Lives Matter movement made by Republican U.S. senator Kelly Loeffler, who at the time was the owner of the WNBA's Atlanta Dream, James assisted Dream player Renee Montgomery in her successful bid to buy the team in March 2021. That same year, James joined Fenway Sports Group as a partner, making him a part-owner of the Boston Red Sox, New England Sports Network, RFK Racing, and Liverpool F.C.; he had already owned a two-percent share in Liverpool F.C. individually. The investment made James and Carter the company's first black partners.

In June 2022, James said that once he finishes playing basketball, he would like to own an NBA team located in Las Vegas, Nevada, either through expansion or relocation. However, in March 2026 he said he was not interested in being part of an ownership group for a Las Vegas franchise. In August 2022, James and the rapper Drake became part owners of the Italian soccer club A.C. Milan. James is also a part owner of the Pittsburgh Penguins of the National Hockey League.

=== Professional contracts ===
James's first agent was Aaron Goodwin. After leaving Goodwin in 2005, James formed the sports marketing company LRMR with his childhood friends Maverick Carter, Ernest "Randy" Mims and Rich Paul. LRMR handles James's marketing, which included the much-criticized television special The Decision. Following his departure from Goodwin, James had signed with agent Leon Rose, who joined Creative Artists Agency (CAA) in 2007. Rose worked with fellow CAA agent Henry Thomas, who represented Dwyane Wade and Chris Bosh, to bring James to Miami in 2010. In 2012, James left CAA and became a client of Paul and the agency he founded, Klutch Sports Group.

Throughout his career, James has taken a unique approach to his NBA contracts, usually opting to sign shorter-term deals in order to maximize his earnings potential and flexibility. (Note: Attributed to multiple references:) For example, in 2006 James and the Cavaliers negotiated a three-year, $60 million contract extension instead of the four-year maximum as it allotted him the option of seeking a new contract worth more money as an unrestricted free agent following the 2010 season. This move allowed James, Dwyane Wade, and Chris Bosh to sign together with the Heat. During the 2011 NBA lockout, James received contract offers to play professional football from the Dallas Cowboys and Seattle Seahawks; he gave the offers serious consideration and even began training with them in mind. During his second stint in Cleveland, based on a negotiation strategy devised by NBA agent Mark Termini, James began re-signing a new contract each season to take advantage of higher salaries resulting from the NBA's rising salary cap. In 2016, he signed with the Cavaliers on a three-year contract, which made him the highest-paid player in the league for the first time in his career.

== Philanthropy ==
James has maintained close ties to his hometown of Akron, Ohio, which is also where his charity foundation, the LeBron James Family Foundation (LJFF), is based. Since 2005, the foundation has held an annual bike-a-thon to raise money for various causes. In 2015, James announced a partnership with the University of Akron to provide scholarships for up to 2,300 children beginning in 2021. In 2017, he received the J. Walter Kennedy Citizenship Award from the NBA for his "outstanding service and dedication to the community."

In November 2017, the Akron School Board approved the I Promise School, a public elementary school created in a partnership with the LJFF to help struggling students stay in school. The school opened on July 30, 2018, with James remarking that it was his most important professional accomplishment. Other initiatives undertaken by James in Akron include the I Promise Institute at the University of Akron, the I Promise Village housing complex, the House Three-Thirty community center and retail plaza, and the I Promise Health Quarters medical center. (Note: Attributed to multiple references:)

James is also an active supporter of various non-profit organizations, including After-School All-Stars, Boys & Girls Clubs of America and Children's Defense Fund. (Note: Attributed to multiple references:) In 2016, he donated $2.5 million to the Smithsonian National Museum of African American History and Culture to support an exhibit on Muhammad Ali. In 2022, the LeBron James Family Foundation partnered with Crypto to educate underserved Akron communities about blockchains and Web3 tools.

== Social activism ==
James has taken public stances on various social issues—many of them controversial—and has mentioned a feeling of obligation to effect change using his status. These issues include the War in Darfur, the killing of Trayvon Martin, Donald Sterling's racist comments in 2014, the Michael Brown verdict, the death of Eric Garner, the U.S. national anthem kneeling protests, the shooting of Breonna Taylor, the death of Ma'Khia Bryant, Kyle Rittenhouse, the Houston Astros sign stealing scandal and the 2022 U.S. Supreme Court ruling that overturned Roe v. Wade. (Note: Attributed to multiple references:)

After a racial slur was painted on the gate of James's Brentwood home in 2017, he commented on the difficulty of being black in the United States. He said, "We got a long way to go for us as a society and for us as African Americans until we feel equal in America." In 2018, Fox News host Laura Ingraham told James to "shut up and dribble" in response to his political statements. That same year, James used Ingraham's statement as the title for a Showtime documentary film series he produced, Shut Up and Dribble, which examines the role of athletes in politics and culture.

In October 2019, NBA executive Daryl Morey expressed support for pro-democracy protesters in Hong Kong. After James said Morey was "misinformed", James was criticized by protesters in the movement, with many using racist language against him on social media. (Note: Attributed to multiple references:) In February 2022, political commentator Bill Maher called James hypocritical for not taking a critical stance towards the Chinese government's human rights abuses.

On August 27, 2020, James and his Lakers teammates, as well as the Milwaukee Bucks, began boycotting the 2020 NBA playoffs to protest the shooting of Jacob Blake. In response, senior White House advisor Jared Kushner said he planned to reach out to James regarding the boycott. Following a players' committee to discuss the boycott, James and others spoke with former president Barack Obama, who reportedly advised them to continue playing and finish the NBA season.

== Politics ==
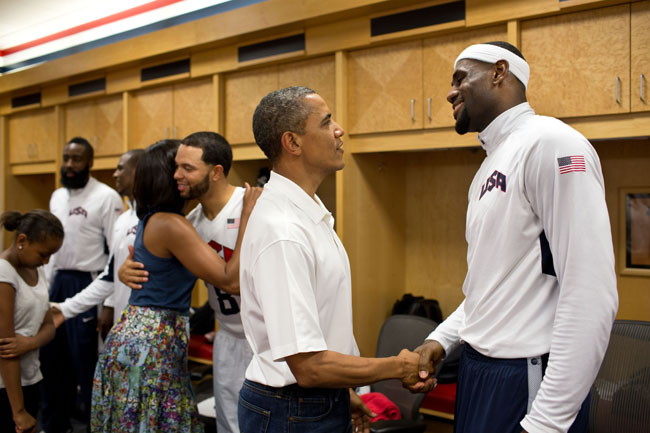
James with U.S. president Barack Obama in 2012. James had supported Obama's 2008 presidential campaign.

In June 2008, James donated $20,000 to a committee in support of Barack Obama's 2008 U.S. presidential election campaign. Later that year, James gathered almost 20,000 people at Rocket Arena (Note: Then known as Quicken Loans Arena) for a free Jay-Z concert and a viewing of Obama's 30-minute American Stories, American Solutions television advertisement. Eight years later, James campaigned for Hillary Clinton during the 2016 U.S. presidential election.

In 2017, James called U.S. President Donald Trump a "bum" after Trump withdrew a White House invitation to Stephen Curry. The following year, James accused Trump of attempting to divide the country with sports, and declared that he would never sit across from Trump. (Note: Attributed to multiple references:) In August 2020, James announced his support for the campaign of Joe Biden for the 2020 U.S. presidential election. James spoke in support of the More Than a Vote movement, encouraging African-Americans to vote and criticizing voter suppression. In October 2024, James announced his support for Kamala Harris in the 2024 U.S. presidential election.

In October 2023, following the October 7th attacks in Israel, James voiced his support for Israel on Instagram. His statement drew backlash for its omission of the Palestinians affected by the ensuing Gaza war. (Note: Attributed to multiple references:)

== Personal life ==
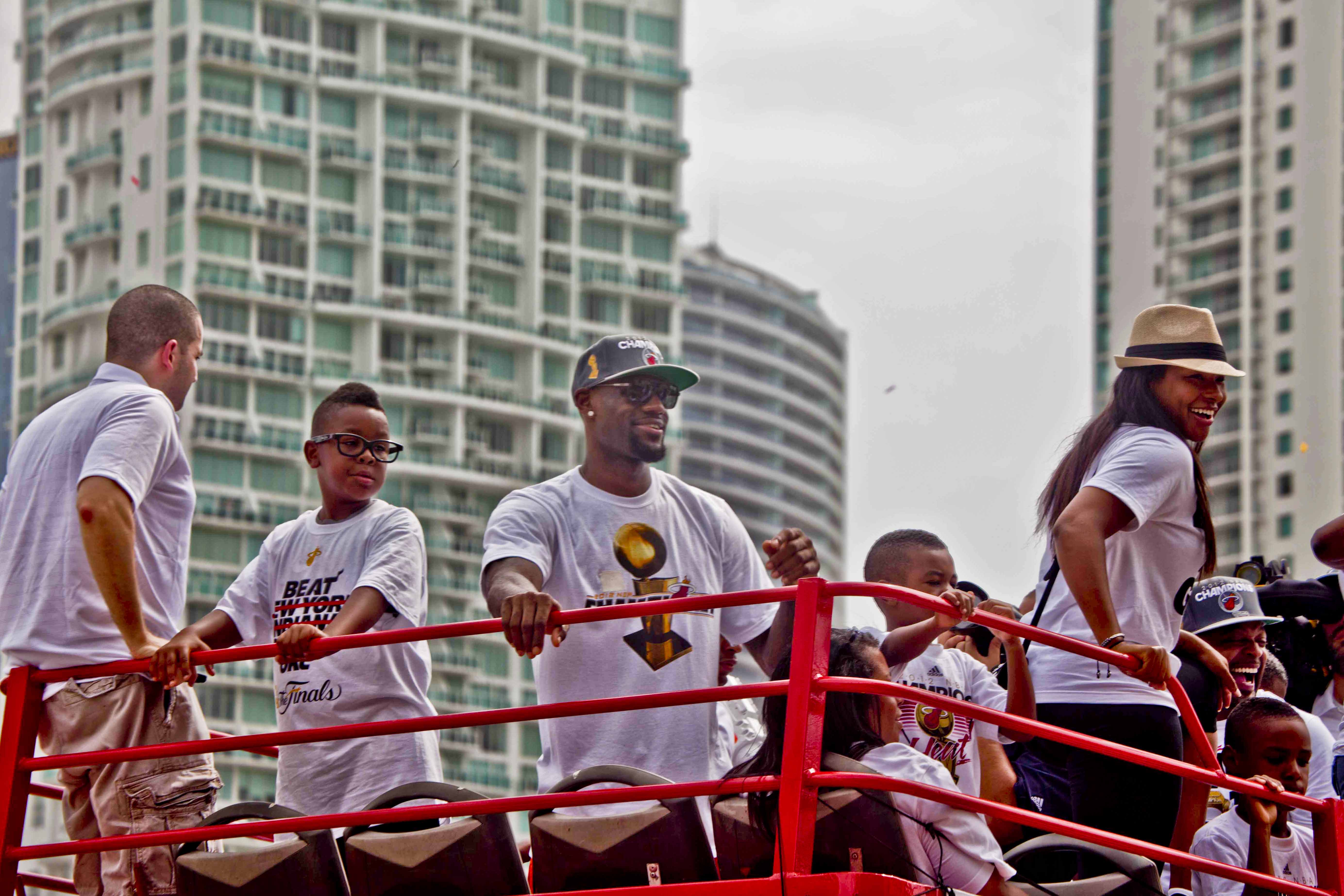
James with his wife Savannah and their children at the Miami Heat's 2012 NBA championship victory parade

James married his high school girlfriend, Savannah Brinson (born August 27, 1986), on September 14, 2013, in San Diego, California. They have two sons, Bronny and Bryce, and a daughter, Zhuri. Bronny was drafted by the Lakers in June 2024 and played his first game with his father that October. In 2017, Cavaliers team chaplain Jerry Birch described James as a Christian. James has referred to God as "the man above".

James owns a 30,000 square foot (2,787 m^{2}) mansion in Akron, Ohio, that he custom-built in 2003 at a cost of $2.1 million. During his stint with the Heat, James lived in Coconut Grove, where he bought a $9 million three-story mansion overlooking Biscayne Bay. In November 2015, he bought a 9,350 square-foot (869 m^{2}) East Coast-style mansion in Brentwood, Los Angeles, for $21 million. He purchased another home in Brentwood in December 2017 for $23 million. In September 2020, he bought a third home in Los Angeles, this one in Beverly Hills, for $36.75 million.

James's closest friends in the NBA are Carmelo Anthony, Chris Paul, and his former Heat teammate Dwyane Wade. The four have been referred to as the "banana boat crew". During an excursion to the Bahamas, James rescued Anthony after he was carried away from their boat by a current. Anthony credited James with saving his life.

In September 2023, new client names from the Biogenesis scandal were released, including that of Ernest "Randy" Mims, a longtime friend and business manager of James, and David Alexander, a well-known trainer of prominent athletes who co-owned a cold-pressed juice and smoothie business with Savannah and also served as her personal trainer. The DEA determined that there "was never any indication that LeBron James did anything wrong."

According to James's business partner Maverick Carter, James was in the habit of spending $1.5 million per year on his body, as reported by Men's Health in 2021. This figure included paying for personal chefs and trainers as well as recovery therapies such as cryotherapy and hyperbaric chambers. In a March 2025 interview, James denied that he spends up to $1 million per year on his health. He told ESPN in 2018 that he drinks wine every night, believing it to be good for his heart. He also has a fondness for sweets, especially chocolate chip cookies. (Note: Attributed to multiple references:) While experiencing sciatica in late 2025, James removed desserts and alcohol from his diet for two months. James enjoys golfing in his free time.

== NBA career statistics ==
Legend
GP	Games played	GS	Games started	MPG	Minutes per game
FG%	Field goal percentage	3P%	3-point field goal percentage	FT%	Free throw percentage
RPG	Rebounds per game	APG	Assists per game	SPG	Steals per game
BPG	Blocks per game	PPG	Points per game	**Bold**	Career high
†	Won an NBA championship	*	Led the league	‡	NBA record

=== Regular season ===
Year	Team	GP	GS	MPG	FG%	3P%	FT%	RPG	APG	SPG	BPG	PPG
2003–04	Cleveland	79	79	39.5	.417	.290	.754	5.5	5.9	1.6	.7	20.9
2004–05	Cleveland	80	80	42.4*	.472	.351	.750	7.4	7.2	**2.2**	.7	27.2
2005–06	Cleveland	79	79	**42.5**	.480	.335	.738	7.0	6.6	1.6	.8	**31.4**
2006–07	Cleveland	78	78	40.9	.476	.319	.698	6.7	6.0	1.6	.7	27.3
2007–08	Cleveland	75	74	40.4	.484	.315	.712	7.9	7.2	1.8	**1.1**	30.0*
2008–09	Cleveland	81	81	37.7	.489	.344	.780	7.6	7.2	1.7	**1.1**	28.4
2009–10	Cleveland	76	76	39.0	.503	.333	.767	7.3	8.6	1.6	1.0	29.7
2010–11	Miami	79	79	38.8	.510	.330	.759	7.5	7.0	1.6	.6	26.7
2011–12†	Miami	62	62	37.5	.531	.362	.771	7.9	6.2	1.9	.8	27.1
2012–13†	Miami	76	76	37.9	.565	.406	.753	8.0	7.3	1.7	.9	26.8
2013–14	Miami	77	77	37.7	**.567**	.379	.750	6.9	6.4	1.6	.3	27.1
2014–15	Cleveland	69	69	36.1	.488	.354	.710	6.0	7.4	1.6	.7	25.3
2015–16†	Cleveland	76	76	35.6	.520	.309	.731	7.4	6.8	1.4	.6	25.3
2016–17	Cleveland	74	74	37.8*	.548	.363	.674	**8.6**	8.7	1.2	.6	26.4
2017–18	Cleveland	**82***	**82***	36.9*	.542	.367	.731	**8.6**	9.1	1.4	.9	27.5
2018–19	L.A. Lakers	55	55	35.2	.510	.339	.665	8.5	8.3	1.3	.6	27.4
2019–20†	L.A. Lakers	67	67	34.6	.493	.348	.693	7.8	**10.2***	1.2	.5	25.3
2020–21	L.A. Lakers	45	45	33.4	.513	.365	.698	7.7	7.8	1.1	.6	25.0
2021–22	L.A. Lakers	56	56	37.2	.524	.359	.756	8.2	6.2	1.3	**1.1**	30.3
2022–23	L.A. Lakers	55	54	35.5	.500	.321	.768	8.3	6.8	.9	.6	28.9
2023–24	L.A. Lakers	71	71	35.3	.540	**.410**	.750	7.3	8.3	1.3	.5	25.7
2024–25	L.A. Lakers	70	70	34.9	.513	.376	**.782**	7.8	8.2	1.0	.6	24.4
2025–26	L.A. Lakers	60	60	33.2	.515	.317	.737	6.1	7.2	1.2	.6	20.9
Career		1,622‡	1,620‡	37.6	.507	.348	.737	7.5	7.4	1.5	.7	26.8
All-Star		21‡	20‡	26.6	.511	.303	.738	5.8	5.6	1.1	.4	21.4

=== Playoffs ===
Year	Team	GP	GS	MPG	FG%	3P%	FT%	RPG	APG	SPG	BPG	PPG
2006	Cleveland	13	13	**46.5**	.476	.333	.737	8.1	5.8	1.4	.7	30.8
2007	Cleveland	20*	20*	44.6	.416	.280	.755	8.1	8.0	1.7	.5	25.1
2008	Cleveland	13	13	42.5	.411	.257	.731	7.8	7.6	1.8	1.3	28.2
2009	Cleveland	14	14	41.4	.510	.333	.749	9.1	7.3	1.6	.9	**35.3**
2010	Cleveland	11	11	41.8	.502	.400	.733	9.3	7.6	1.7	**1.8**	29.1
2011	Miami	21*	21*	43.9	.466	.353	.763	8.4	5.9	1.7	1.2	23.7
2012†	Miami	**23***	**23***	42.8	.500	.259	.739	9.7	5.6	1.9	.7	30.3
2013†	Miami	**23***	**23***	41.8	.491	.375	.777	8.4	6.6	1.8	.8	25.9
2014	Miami	20	20	38.2	.565	.407	**.806**	7.1	4.8	1.9	.6	27.4
2015	Cleveland	20	20	42.2	.417	.227	.731	**11.3**	8.5	1.7	1.1	30.1
2016†	Cleveland	21	21	39.1	.525	.340	.661	9.5	7.6	2.3	1.3	26.3
2017	Cleveland	18*	18*	41.3	.565	**.411**	.698	9.1	7.8	1.9	1.3	32.8
2018	Cleveland	22*	22*	41.9	.539	.342	.746	9.1	**9.0**	1.4	1.0	34.0
2020†	L.A. Lakers	21*	21*	36.3	.560	.370	.720	10.8	8.8	1.2	.9	27.6
2021	L.A. Lakers	6	6	37.3	.474	.375	.609	7.2	8.0	1.5	.3	23.3
2023	L.A. Lakers	16	16	38.7	.498	.264	.761	9.9	6.5	1.1	1.1	24.5
2024	L.A. Lakers	5	5	40.8	**.566**	.385	.739	6.8	8.8	**2.4**	1.0	27.8
2025	L.A. Lakers	5	5	40.8	.489	.357	.775	9.0	5.6	2.0	**1.8**	25.4
2026	L.A. Lakers	10	10	38.4	.459	.327	.746	6.7	7.3	1.3	.3	23.2
Career		302‡	302‡	41.2	.495	.332	.741	8.9	7.2	1.7	1.0	28.2

== Achievements and honors ==
NBA

- 4× NBA champion: 2012, 2013, 2016, 2020
- 4× NBA Finals Most Valuable Player: 2012, 2013, 2016, 2020
- 4× NBA Most Valuable Player: 2009, 2010, 2012, 2013
- 22× NBA All-Star: 2005, 2006, 2007, 2008, 2009, 2010, 2011, 2012, 2013, 2014, 2015, 2016, 2017, 2018, 2019, 2020, 2021, 2022, 2023, 2024, 2025, 2026
- 3× NBA All-Star Game MVP: 2006, 2008, 2018
- 21× All-NBA selection:
  - First team: 2006, 2008, 2009, 2010, 2011, 2012, 2013, 2014, 2015, 2016, 2017, 2018, 2020
  - Second team: 2005, 2007, 2021, 2025
  - Third team: 2019, 2022, 2023, 2024
- 6× NBA All-Defensive selection:
  - First Team: 2009, 2010, 2011, 2012, 2013
  - Second Team: 2014
- NBA Rookie of the Year: 2004
- NBA All-Rookie First Team: 2004
- NBA scoring leader: 2008
- NBA assists leader: 2020
- 3× NBA minutes leader: 2007, 2017, 2018
- J. Walter Kennedy Citizenship Award: 2017
- NBA 75th Anniversary Team
- NBA Cup winner: 2023
- NBA Cup Most Valuable Player: 2023
- NBA Cup All-Tournament Team: 2023

USA Basketball

- 3× Olympic Gold Medal winner: 2008, 2012, 2024
- Olympic Bronze Medal winner: 2004
- FIBA Men's Olympics Most Valuable Player: 2024
- FIBA Men's Olympics All-Star Five: 2024
- FIBA World Championship Bronze Medal winner: 2006
- FIBA Americas Championship Gold Medal winner: 2007
- USA Basketball Male Athlete of the Year: 2012
- Commemorative banner in Miami's American Airlines Arena (for his 2012 gold medal won as a member of the Miami Heat)

High school

- 2003 National Champion
- 3× OHSAA Champion: 2000, 2001, 2003
- OHSAA Division IV All-Ohio First Team Offense (football): 2001
- Naismith Prep Player of the Year: 2003
- 2× Mr. Basketball USA: 2002, 2003
- 2× Gatorade National Player of the Year: 2002, 2003
- 2× USA Today High School Player of the Year: 2002, 2003
- 3× Ohio Mr. Basketball: 2001, 2002, 2003
- 3× USA Today All-USA First Team: 2001, 2002, 2003
- 2× PARADE High School Player of the Year: 2002, 2003
- McDonald's National Player of the Year: 2003
- McDonald's High School All-American: 2003
- McDonald's All-American Game MVP: 2003
- EA Sports Roundball Classic MVP: 2003
- Jordan Brand Classic MVP: 2003
- No. 23 retired by St. Vincent–St. Mary
- St. Vincent–St. Mary home basketball court named The LeBron James Arena

Media

- AP Athlete of the Decade: 2010–2019
- 4× AP Athlete of the Year: 2013, 2016, 2018, 2020
- 3× Sports Illustrated Sportsperson of the Year: 2012, 2016, 2020
- Sporting News Athlete of the Year: 2012
- 3× Sporting News NBA MVP: 2006, 2009, 2010
- Sporting News Rookie of the Year: 2004
- Sports Illustrated NBA All-Decade First Team: 2000–2009
- 2× Hickok Belt winner: 2012, 2013
- 20× ESPY Award winner in various categories (16 individually, four as part of a team)
- 9× BET Sportsman of the Year Award winner
- Time Athlete of the Year: 2020
- Co-flag bearer for the U.S. at the 2024 Summer Olympics opening ceremony
- 4× Time 100 Most Influential People: 2005, 2013, 2017, 2019

NAACP Image Awards

- 2017 Jackie Robinson Award
- 2021 President's Award

Sports Emmy Awards

- 2020 Outstanding Long Sports Documentary (as executive producer of What's My Name? – Muhammad Ali Part 1)
- 2021 Outstanding Edited Sports Series (as executive producer of The Shop: Uninterrupted)
- 2023 Outstanding Long Documentary (as executive producer of The Redeem Team)

Halls of Fame

- Naismith Memorial Basketball Hall of Fame – Class of 2025 as a member of the 2008 United States men's Olympic basketball team ("Redeem Team")
- St. Vincent–St. Mary Hall of Fame – Class of 2011

Fashion

- First black man to appear on the cover of Vogue, posing with supermodel Gisele Bündchen on the April 2008 edition
- Honorary chair of the 2025 Met Gala in Manhattan

State/Local

- 6× Cleveland Sports Awards Professional Athlete of the Year: 2004, 2005, 2006, 2009, 2015, 2016
- South Main Street in downtown Akron renamed King James Way
- Six-story commemorative banner in downtown Akron
- Featured on Space Jam-inspired mural in Akron
- Featured on "Cleveland is the Reason" mural in downtown Cleveland with other notable Cleveland-area figures
- Honorary lockers at Ohio State's football and basketball facilities
- LeBron James Home Court Museum in Akron, Ohio
- As part of a 10-year anniversary celebration of the Cavaliers' 2016 NBA Championship, a new public outdoor basketball court in downtown Cleveland was opened on June 19, 2026. James is featured prominently on both a banner overseeing the court, and on the court itself where his name and number are etched in.

== Filmography ==
=== Film ===
Year	Title	Role	Notes
2008	More than a Game	Himself	
2009	Square Roots: The Story of SpongeBob SquarePants	Himself	—
2015	Trainwreck	Himself	
2018	Smallfoot	Gwangi	Voice role
2021	Space Jam: A New Legacy	Himself	Also co-producer
2022	Black Ice	—	Executive producer
2022	Hustle	—	Producer
2022	The Redeem Team	Himself	
2023	House Party	Himself	Also co-producer
TBA	Weekend Warriors	—	Producer

=== Television ===
Year	Title	Role	Notes
2004	My Wife and Kids	Himself	Episode: "Outbreak Monkey"
2005	The Simpsons	Himself	Episode: "Homer and Ned's Hail Mary Pass"
2007	Saturday Night Live	Himself	Episode: "LeBron James/Kanye West"
2009	Entourage	Himself	Episode: "Give a Little Bit"
2009	SpongeBob SquarePants	Himself	Episode: "SpongeBob's Truth or Square"
2011	The Cleveland Show	Himself	Episode: "A Short Story and a Tall Tale"
2011–2014	The LeBrons	Himself	Lead role
2014; 2020	Becoming	Himself	Pilot; also executive producer
2015	Survivor's Remorse	Himself	Episode: "Guts"
2016	Teen Titans Go!	Himself	Episode: "The Cruel Giggling Ghoul"
2017–present	The Wall	—	Executive producer
2018–present	The Shop	Host	Executive producer
2020	Graduate Together: America Honors the High School Class of 2020	Host	Executive producer
2020	Self Made	—	Executive producer
2022	Legacy: The True Story of the LA Lakers	Himself	Documentary series
2024	Starting 5	Himself	Documentary series
2026	Cartoonified with Phineas and Ferb	Himself	Episode: "LeBron and Zhuri James meet Phineas and Ferb!"

== See also ==
- Cleveland Cavaliers draft history
- List of first overall NBA draft picks
- List of most-followed Instagram accounts
- List of NBA career scoring leaders
- List of NBA career rebounding leaders
- List of NBA career assists leaders
- List of NBA career steals leaders
- List of NBA career turnovers leaders
- List of NBA career 3-point scoring leaders
- List of NBA career free throw scoring leaders
- List of NBA seasons played leaders
- List of NBA career games played leaders
- List of NBA career minutes played leaders
- List of NBA career triple-double leaders
- List of NBA career playoff scoring leaders
- List of NBA career playoff assists leaders
- List of NBA career playoff rebounding leaders
- List of NBA career playoff steals leaders
- List of NBA career playoff blocks leaders
- List of NBA career playoff triple-double leaders
- List of NBA career playoff turnovers leaders
- List of NBA career playoff 3-point scoring leaders
- List of NBA career playoff free throw scoring leaders
- List of NBA career playoff minutes leaders
- List of NBA franchise career scoring leaders
- List of NBA annual minutes leaders
- List of NBA single-game scoring leaders
- List of NBA single-game playoff scoring leaders
- List of basketball players with most career points
- List of Olympic medalists in basketball
- NBA All-Star Game records
- NBA post-season records
- NBA regular season records
- Shooting Stars (2023 film)
- List of oldest and youngest NBA players

== Notes ==
Olympic Games
Preceded by Sue Bird; Eddy Alvarez	Flagbearer for United States; Paris 2024; With: Coco Gauff	Succeeded by Incumbent
