= More Than a Vote =

United States-based non-profit organization

More than a Vote is a nonprofit organization fighting for African Americans's voting rights, as well as advocating criminal justice reform in the United States. It was founded in June 2020, amid the Black Lives Matter protests following the murders of Breonna Taylor and George Floyd, by NBA basketball player LeBron James and other black athletes and entertainers. More Than a Vote works with non-partisan VoteRiders to spread state-specific information on voter ID requirements.

In August, 2024, WNBA ten-time All-Star, Nneka Ogwumike, took over leadership of the organization, refocusing its attention to reproductive rights for the 2024 election cycle. Ogwumike is joined by a coalition of WNBA. players including, Brittney Griner, Breanna Stewart, A'ja Wilson, Cameron Brink, Chelsea Gray, Naz Hillmon, Jewell Loyd, Jordin Canada, and Allisha Gray, who will help to educate the public on threats to women's reproductive rights.

Stephanie Shriock, previous president of Emily's List, was named as the organization's 2024 senior campaign advisor.

== See also ==
- Voter suppression in the United States
