= Becoming (2020 TV series) =

- Genre: Documentary
- Based on: Becoming (2014) by LeBron James
- Directed by: Dan Howlett
- Music by: David Vanacore
- Country of origin: United States
- Original language: English
- No. of seasons: 1
- No. of episodes: 10

Production
- Executive producers: Rebecca Bruno; Philip Byron; Maverick Carter; Jamal Henderson; LeBron James; Will Nothacker
- Producers: Emily Moffet; Dan Howlett; Isabel Perez-Loehmann; Renee Turner Sniatkowski
- Cinematography: Gregory Purpura
- Editor: Kris Byrnes
- Running time: 24 minutes
- Production companies: SpringHill Entertainment; ITV America

Original release
- Network: Disney+
- Release: September 18, 2020

Becoming is an American documentary television series produced by Walt Disney Television for Disney+. Episodes focus on different celebrities and their respective roads to fame.

Based on the 2014 pilot produced by LeBron James and Maverick Carter for Disney XD, Becoming started as a series that profiled professional athletes. After being picked up by Disney+, it debuted its 10-episode run on September 18, 2020, on the streaming service.

Becoming was nominated for the Outstanding Unstructured Reality Program award at the 2021 Primetime Emmy Awards.

== Plot ==
Each episode of Becoming profiles a different celebrity as they revisit the challenges and obstacles that they overcame to reach success. Celebrities retell stories and visit locations that became pivotal to their careers.

== Production ==
Becoming began as a half-hour special executive produced by LeBron James and Maverick Carter and filmed in Akron, Ohio, that recounts James' rise to stardom in the NBA. This pilot premiered on Disney XD on October 26, 2014, and was produced by ESPN Films and James' SpringHill Production Company. According to James, "Sports and athletes were my inspiration growing up. It was the stories about Michael Jordan, Deion Sanders, and Allen Iverson that kept me dreaming. When I learned that they had some of the same struggles and challenges I did, it made everything seem possible. That's what Becoming is all about."

On February 10, 2015, Disney XD announced that Becoming had been greenlit for a full series, and James stated that it would focus on stories of professional athletes. This iteration of the series includes episodes about Alex Morgan, CC Sabathia, and Tim Howard.

On October 28, 2019, Disney+ picked up Becoming for ten episodes to be produced with SpringHill Entertainment, Spoke Studios, and ITV America. Instead of focusing solely on sports, this iteration of the series "chronicles the origin stories of world-class entertainers, musicians and athletes." All ten episodes were released on Disney+ on September 18, 2020.

== Episodes ==
No.	Title	Original release date
1	"Anthony Davis"	September 18, 2020
2	"Adam DeVine"	September 18, 2020
3	"Candace Parker"	September 18, 2020
4	"Caleb McLaughlin"	September 18, 2020
5	"Colbie Caillat"	September 18, 2020
6	"Nick Kroll"	September 18, 2020
7	"Julianne Hough"	September 18, 2020
8	"Nick Cannon"	September 18, 2020
9	"Ashley Tisdale"	September 18, 2020
10	"Rob Gronkowski"	September 18, 2020

== Reception ==
Becoming was nominated for Outstanding Unstructured Reality Program at the 2021 Primetime Emmy Awards.
