= Stephanie Schriock =

American political strategist

- Born: March 18, 1973 (age 53); Mankato, Minnesota, U.S.
- Education: Minnesota State University, Mankato (BA); George Washington University
- Political party: Democratic

Stephanie Schriock (born March 18, 1973) is an American political strategist and former president of EMILY's List, a position she served in from 2010 until 2021.

== Early life and education ==
Schriock was born in Mankato, Minnesota, in 1973. She attended Butte High School. She graduated from Minnesota State University, Mankato in 1995 and did master's work at George Washington University in political management.

== Career ==
Schriock managed the races of Senator Jon Tester in 2006 and Senator Al Franken in 2008. She was also Finance Director for Howard Dean's 2004 Presidential campaign. Schriock was considered a potential candidate in the 2014 United States Senate election in Montana before ultimately declining to run.

In 2010, Schriock was elected president of EMILY's List, an organization dedicated to recruiting pro-choice Democratic women to run for elected office, succeeding founder Ellen Malcolm. Schriock raised more than $52 million and elected a record number of women to the House and Senate in 2012. In 2011, she urged Elizabeth Warren to run for the Senate, an election she would go on to win with the support of EMILY's List. Schriock also led the organization in support of Hillary Clinton's 2016 presidential bid and was herself reportedly considered by Clinton to be her campaign manager. In the 2020 democratic presidential primaries, Schriock announced the organization would endorse Elizabeth Warren, crediting her past relationship with Warren as a reason for the endorsement. Laphonza Butler succeeded her as president of EMILY's List in 2021.

She serves on the Board of Advisors of Let America Vote, an organization founded by former Missouri Secretary of State Jason Kander that aims to end voter suppression.

Schriock was named senior campaign advisor to More Than a Vote in 2024.
