= James Harden =

American basketball player (born 1989)

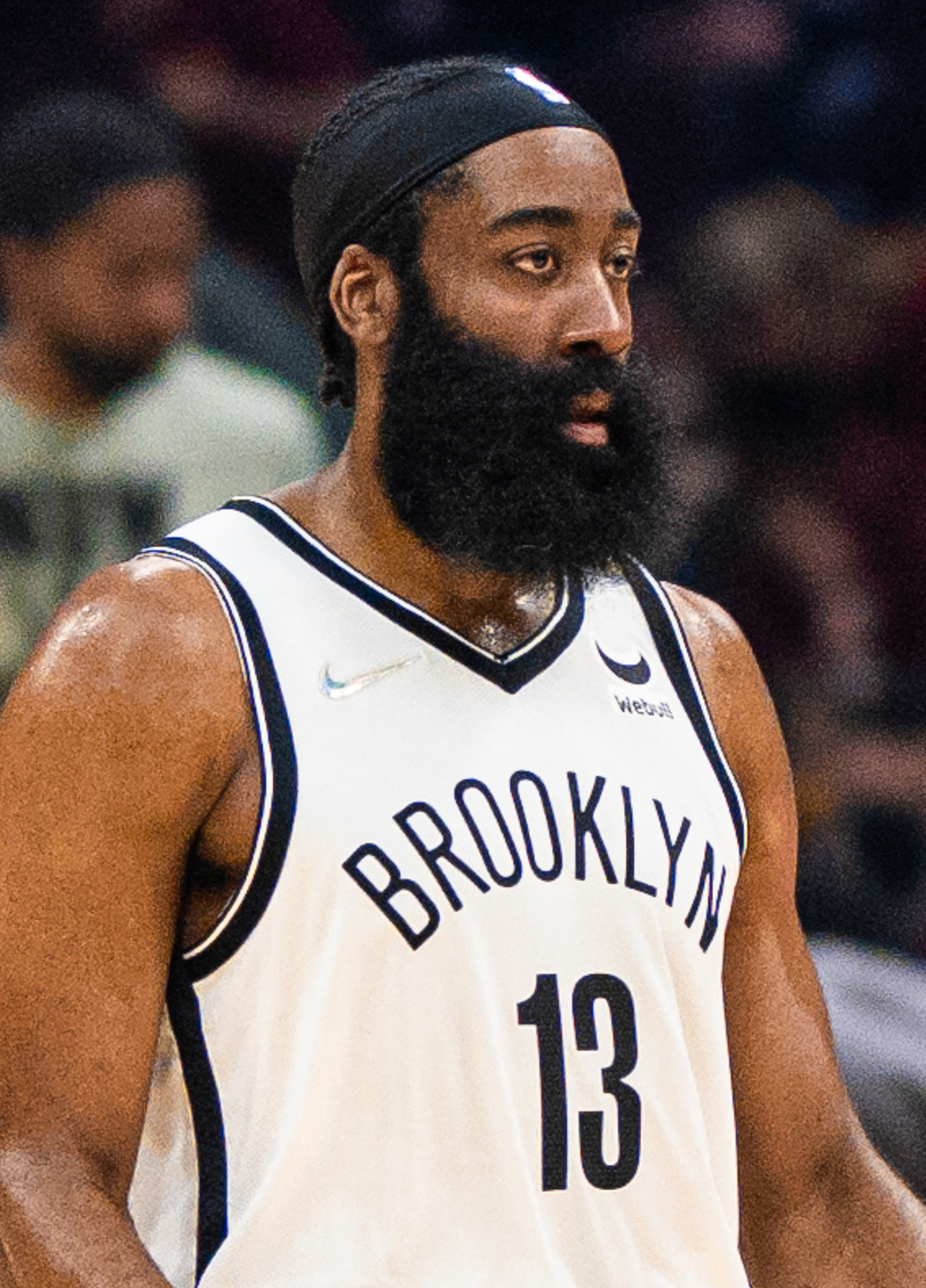
- Harden with the Brooklyn Nets in 2022

No. 1 – Cleveland Cavaliers
- Position: Point guard / shooting guard
- League: NBA

Personal information
- Born: August 26, 1989 (age 37) Los Angeles, California, U.S.
- Listed height: 6 ft 4 in (1.93 m)
- Listed weight: 220 lb (100 kg)

Career information
- High school: Artesia (Lakewood, California)
- College: Arizona State (2007–2009)
- NBA draft: 2009: 1st round, 3rd overall pick
- Drafted by: Oklahoma City Thunder
- Playing career: 2009–present

Career history
- 2009–2012: Oklahoma City Thunder
- 2012–2021: Houston Rockets
- 2021–2022: Brooklyn Nets
- 2022–2023: Philadelphia 76ers
- 2023–2026: Los Angeles Clippers
- 2026–present: Cleveland Cavaliers

Career highlights
- NBA Most Valuable Player (2018); 11× NBA All-Star (2013–2022, 2025); 6× All-NBA First Team (2014, 2015, 2017–2020); 2× All-NBA Third Team (2013, 2025); NBA Sixth Man of the Year (2012); 3× NBA scoring champion (2018–2020); 2× NBA assists leader (2017, 2023); NBA All-Rookie Second Team (2010); NBA 75th Anniversary Team; Consensus first-team All-American (2009); Pac-10 Player of the Year (2009); 2× First-team All-Pac-10 (2008, 2009); No. 13 jersey retired by Arizona State Sun Devils; Second-team Parade All-American (2007); McDonald's All-American (2007)
- Stats at NBA.com
- Stats at Basketball Reference
Medals
Men's basketball
Representing the United States
Olympic Games
Gold medal – first place	2012 London	Team
World Cup
Gold medal – first place	2014 Spain	Team

James Edward Harden Jr. (born August 26, 1989) is an American professional basketball player for the Cleveland Cavaliers of the National Basketball Association (NBA). He is widely regarded as one of the greatest shooting guards and scorers in NBA history. In 2021, Harden was honored as one of the league's top 75 players by being named to the NBA 75th Anniversary Team. Harden is also a two-time member of the United States national team, winning gold medals at the 2012 Summer Olympics and 2014 FIBA World Cup. Harden is nicknamed "the Beard" after his characteristic facial hair.

Harden played college basketball for the Arizona State Sun Devils, where he was named a consensus All-American and Pac-10 Player of the Year in 2009. Harden was selected with the third overall pick in the 2009 NBA draft by the Oklahoma City Thunder. In 2012, he was named NBA Sixth Man of the Year and helped Oklahoma City reach the NBA Finals, where they lost to the Miami Heat in five games. After the Thunder refused to offer him a max contract extension, Harden was unwilling to take a pay cut and was subsequently traded to the Houston Rockets before the 2012–13 season.

In his first season with the Rockets, Harden set or matched several team records and was named to his first All-NBA Team (a third-team selection), as well as his first NBA All-Star team. Over the next seven full seasons with Houston, Harden led the league in scoring three times and assists once, and was named the NBA Most Valuable Player in 2018 while leading the Rockets to the Western Conference Finals. He was also named to seven consecutive NBA All-Star teams and earned All-NBA First Team honors six times. After requesting a trade at the beginning of the 2020–21 season, Harden was traded to the Brooklyn Nets as part of a four-team trade. With Brooklyn, he was named to his ninth and tenth consecutive All-Star games before being traded to the Philadelphia 76ers at the 2022 trade deadline. In 2023, Harden led the league in assists for the second time in his career. He was traded to the Los Angeles Clippers at the start of the 2023–24 season and was named to his 11th All-Star Game in 2025. In 2026, after two-and-half seasons with LA, he was traded to Cleveland at the trade deadline.

== Early life ==
James Harden was born on August 26, 1989, in Los Angeles, California to Monja Willis. Before his birth, after that of his older sister, their mother suffered a string of miscarriages. With a 10 year age gap between Harden and his older siblings, she nicknamed him “Lucky”. He and his two siblings were raised by his mother in Compton. He shares two older half-siblings through his father, sister Arniq Jelks and brother Akili Roberson, who played quarterback for Kansas in 1997. Harden played baseball growing up but focused on basketball around age 10.

== High school career ==
Harden attended Artesia High School in Lakewood, California. In his sophomore year, he averaged 13.2 points as Artesia went 28–5. He improved his stats to 18.8 points, 7.7 boards and 3.5 assists in his junior season and led Artesia to the California state title and a 33–1 record. Artesia repeated as state champions in Harden's final year after going 33–2. Harden had similar stats during the previous season: 18.8 points, 7.9 rebounds, and 3.9 assists. He was named a McDonald's All-American, and also earned second-team Parade All-American honors.

He also helped his AAU team, Pump-N-Run Elite, to the 2006 Las Vegas Adidas Super 64 championship. Harden had 34 points in the victory over a DC Assault team which included Michael Beasley, Nolan Smith and Austin Freeman. In the game against Houston Hoops, played on the same day, Harden had 33 points. In the final, Pump-N-Run Elite beat Kevin Love's Southern California All-Stars.

== College career ==
In Harden's freshman year, Arizona State was picked to finish ninth in the Pac-10 Conference. Behind his 17.8 points, 5.3 rebounds and 3.2 assists per game, the Sun Devils went 21–13 (9–9) and finished tied for fifth in the Pac-10. They were considered a bubble team for the 2008 NCAA tournament. Left out of the tournament, they were selected to the 2008 NIT field and defeated Alabama State and Southern Illinois before falling to defending national champion Florida.

After his freshman year, Harden was named first-team All-Pac-10 and was named to the conference all-freshman team. He was also named first team All-District by the NABC and the USBWA. Entering his sophomore year, Harden appeared on many pre-season All-American lists and on the cover of the Sports Illustrated college basketball preview issue. He was named to the Wooden Award preseason watch list. On November 30, 2008, Harden scored a career-high 40 points in an 88–58 victory over UTEP.

Harden finished his sophomore campaign with averages of 20.1 points, 5.6 rebounds, and 4.2 assists. He was named to the 2009 All-Pac 10 Tournament Team following Arizona State's defeat by USC at the Staples Center. Following the conference season, Harden was named the Pacific-10 Conference's Player of the Year. He was also named a consensus All-American. After the conclusion of the season (a second-round NCAA tournament loss to Syracuse), Harden declared for the 2009 NBA draft. He employed Rob Pelinka as his agent.

== Professional career ==
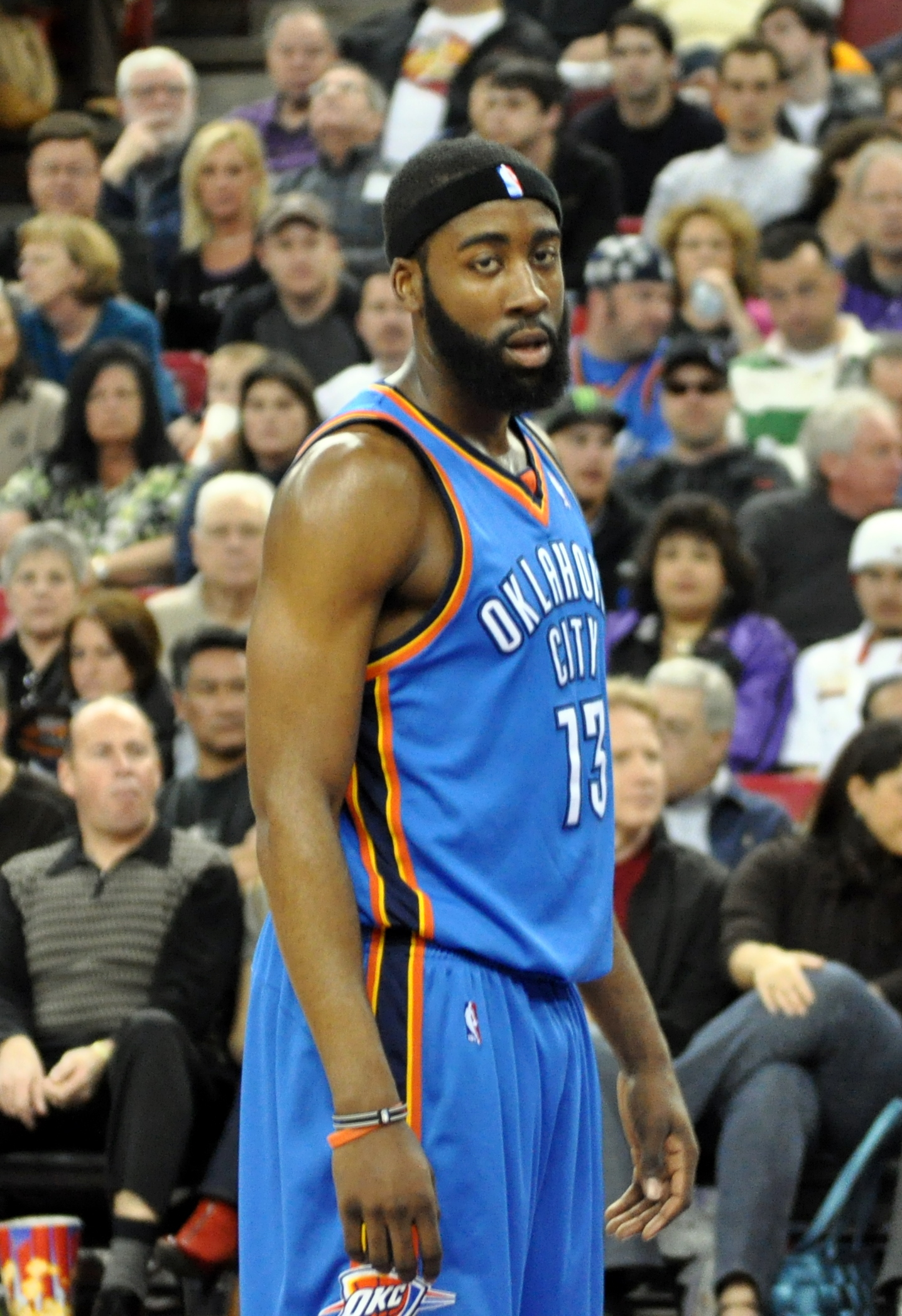
Harden with the Thunder in 2010

=== Oklahoma City Thunder (2009–2012) ===
Harden was selected with the third overall pick in the 2009 NBA draft by the Oklahoma City Thunder. He recorded the fourth highest 3-point percentage in NBA history (.375) for a player under the age of 21 (with a minimum of 150 attempts) during the 2009–10 season. He connected on seven straight 3-point field goals over two games (November 18 and 20), recording the most consecutive 3-point makes by a rookie since Houston guard Michael Dickerson made eight straight in May 1999. He was named to the NBA All-Rookie Second Team at the conclusion of the season.

During the 2010–11 season, he scored 10-plus points on 54 occasions, including a season-high 26 points against the Phoenix Suns on March 6, 2011.

Harden averaged 16.8 points, 4.1 rebounds and 3.7 assists in 62 games (two starts) during the lockout-shortened 2011–12 season, as he received the NBA Sixth Man of the Year Award.

Harden scored in double-figures in all but four of his appearances during the season. He scored a season-high 40 points against Phoenix on April 18, 2012, becoming the first NBA player in a reserve role to score 40 points since Dallas guard Rodrigue Beaubois in March 2010. Harden helped the Thunder reach the 2012 NBA Finals, where they were defeated in five games by the Miami Heat.

During the 2012 free agency period, Oklahoma City attempted to sign Harden to a four-year contract extension worth between $52 and $55 million. Harden later contended that he was given too little time to consider the offer.

=== Houston Rockets (2012–2021) ===
==== 2012–2013: First All-Star and All-NBA selections ====
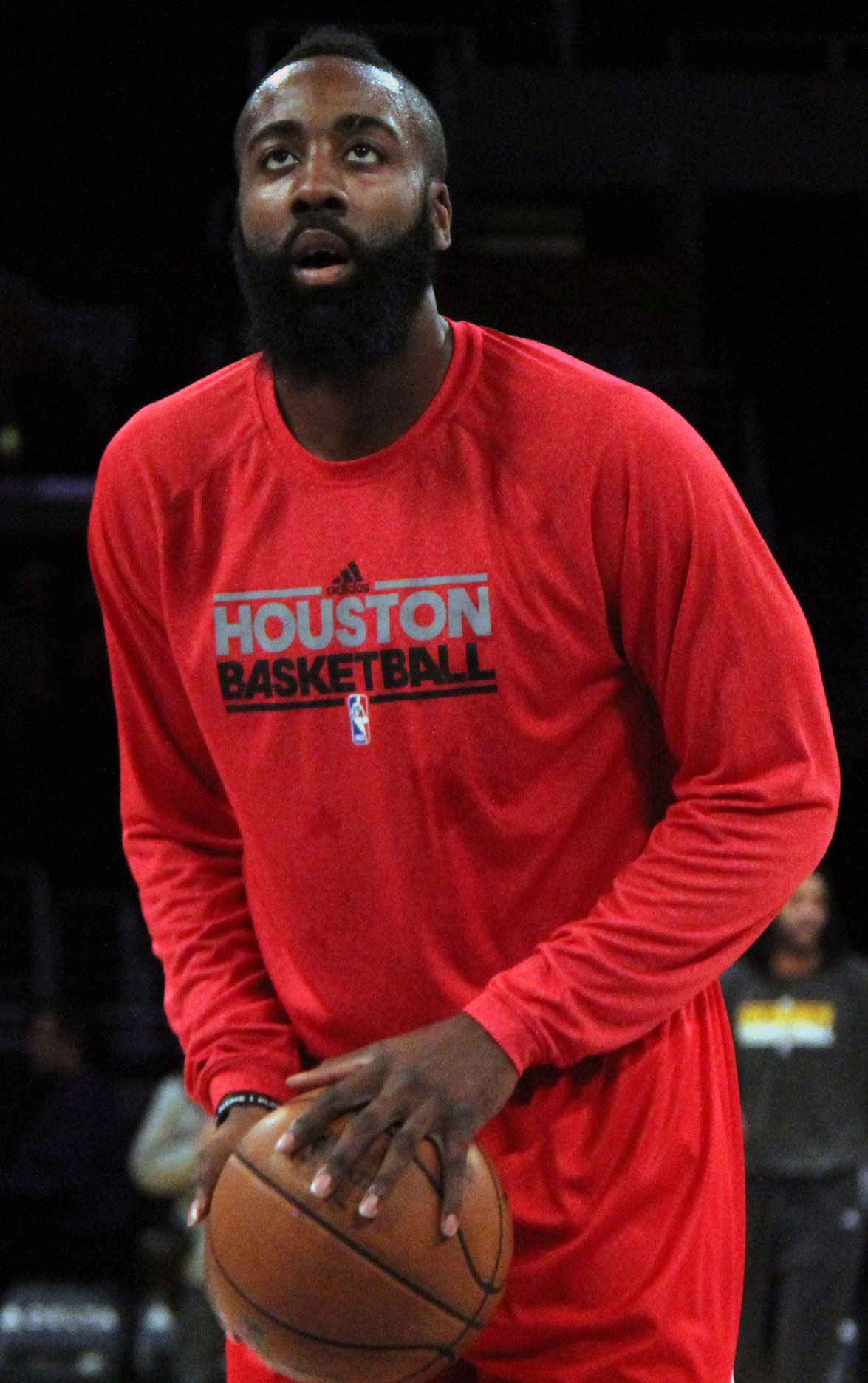
Harden with the Rockets in 2012

After failing to agree on a contract extension with the Thunder, Harden was traded to the Houston Rockets on October 27, 2012, along with Daequan Cook, Cole Aldrich, and Lazar Hayward, in exchange for Kevin Martin, Jeremy Lamb, two first round picks (which became Steven Adams in 2013 and Mitch McGary in 2014), and a second round pick (which became Álex Abrines in 2013). Rockets general manager Daryl Morey called Harden a "foundational" player and expected him to be Houston's featured player despite previously only playing a supporting role behind Kevin Durant and Russell Westbrook. On October 31, 2012, Harden signed a contract extension with the Rockets for five years worth $80 million.

That same day, he became the first-ever NBA player to score 37 or more points while registering a double-digit assist total in his team debut, posting 37 points, a career-high 12 assists, six rebounds, four steals and one block in a 105–96 win over the Detroit Pistons. He became just the fourth NBA player in the last 25 years to post those totals in a single game and matched the third-highest point total for any NBA player in his team debut (most for Rockets debut). Two days later, he scored 45 points against the Atlanta Hawks. His 82 total points were the most scored by a player in his first two games with a team in NBA history, surpassing the previous mark held by Wilt Chamberlain, who scored 79 points in his first two career games with the Philadelphia Warriors in 1959. He registered the first triple-double of his career on February 2, 2013, against the Charlotte Bobcats, recording 21 points, 11 rebounds and 11 assists. Harden was named as a reserve for the 2013 NBA All-Star Game, marking his first All-Star selection. He recorded 15 points, six rebounds and three assists in a 143–138 win by the West over the East. On February 20, 2013, Harden scored a career-high 46 points in a 122–119 win over his former team, the Oklahoma City Thunder.

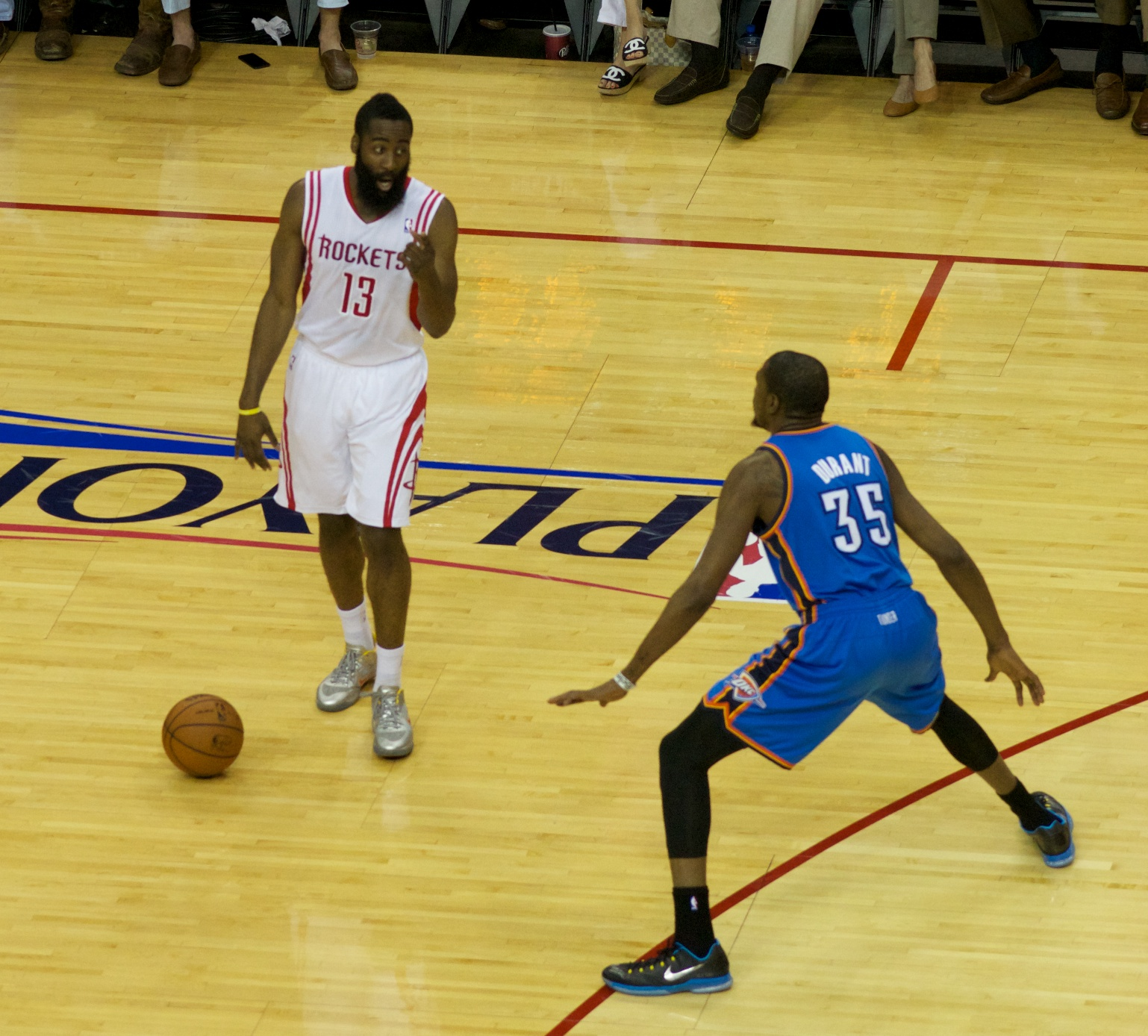
Harden (left) and Kevin Durant during the 2013 NBA playoffs

Harden had one of the greatest statistical seasons in team history in his first campaign with Houston. He became just the fifth player in team history to reach 2,000 points in one campaign (2,023 points). He surpassed Moses Malone's team mark for free throws made in a season (630 FTM in 1981–82), joining Malone as the only two Rockets players to ever reach 600 free throws made in a single season. Harden joined Gilbert Arenas (2005–06 and 2006–07), Kobe Bryant (2005–06 and 2007–08) and Jerry Stackhouse (2000–01) as the only four players in NBA history to record at least 600 free throws made and hit 150 or more 3-pointers in one season. Harden joined Tracy McGrady (four times in 2004–05) and Hakeem Olajuwon (three times in 1992–93) as the only Rockets to ever capture Player of the Week honors three or more times in one season. He was named to the 2012–13 All-NBA Third Team, marking his first career All-NBA Team selection while becoming just the seventh player in Rockets history to earn All-NBA recognition.

==== 2013–2014: First All-NBA First Team selection ====
Harden was selected by the head coaches as a reserve for the 2014 NBA All-Star Game, which marked his second consecutive All-Star selection. He was later named as a replacement starter for the All-Star Game. He was the first Rockets player ever to pick up Western Conference Player of the Week honors in consecutive weeks in the same season (February 24 – March 2; March 3–9). On December 26, 2013, against the Memphis Grizzlies, Harden became the first player in NBA history to register at least 27 points on two or fewer field goals made (2–9 FG), finishing with a career best 22-of-25 from the stripe and tying the Rockets single-game record for free throws made (22–27 FT by Sleepy Floyd in February 1991). On February 5, 2014, against the Phoenix Suns, Harden became just the third player to score at least 3,000 points in his first 120 games played with the Rockets, joining Elvin Hayes (3,320) and Tracy McGrady (3,056). On February 25, 2014, he scored a season-high 43 points in a 129–103 win over the Sacramento Kings. At the season's end, he earned All-NBA First Team honors.

==== 2014–2016: MVP runner-up and turnovers record ====
Over the first two months of the season, Harden was in MVP contention with scoring over 40 points 3 times in a 6 game stretch. In April 2015, he became the first player in franchise history to have two 50-point games in a season. He helped the Rockets win their first division title since 1994 and clinched the No. 2 seed in the Western Conference. Harden was again named to the All-NBA First Team, and finished second in the NBA MVP voting behind Stephen Curry. Harden was later voted the inaugural National Basketball Players Association's MVP for the 2014–15 season.

In Game 5 of the Rockets' second round playoff series against the Los Angeles Clippers, Harden recorded his first career playoff triple-double with 26 points, 11 rebounds and 10 assists. McHale benched Harden in the 4th quarter when the Rockets came back to win Game 6 against the Clippers. In Game 4 of the Western Conference Finals against the Golden State Warriors, Harden scored a playoff career-high 45 points. In Game 5 of the Western Conference Finals, Harden had a forgettable finale, with a playoff-record 13 turnovers and 14 points on 2-of-11 shooting.

In November 2015, Harden became the first Rocket to score 43-plus points in consecutive games since Malone had two streaks of three games doing so during the 1981–82 season. On November 18, head coach Kevin McHale was fired after the Rockets began the season with a 4–7 record. McHale later believed Harden had intentionally showed up to camp overweight to get McHale fired in retaliation for benching him in the Clippers series.

On January 20, Harden became the first player to have at least 33 points, 17 rebounds and 14 assists in a game since Wilt Chamberlain had 53 points, 32 rebounds and 14 assists for Philadelphia in March 1968. Harden finished March with 457 points, 152 assists and 102 rebounds, becoming the first player to record at least 450 points, 150 assists and 100 rebounds in a single month since Oscar Robertson did it in December 1967. Harden finished the 2015–16 season with 374 turnovers, beating Artis Gilmore's mark of 366 in 1977–78, the first season the NBA recorded turnovers. Harden set career marks in points (29), assists (7.5) and rebounds (6.1) to join LeBron James, Michael Jordan and Oscar Robertson as the only players in NBA history to average at least 29 points, seven assists and six rebounds in a season.

==== 2016–2017: Point guard role and leading the NBA in assists ====
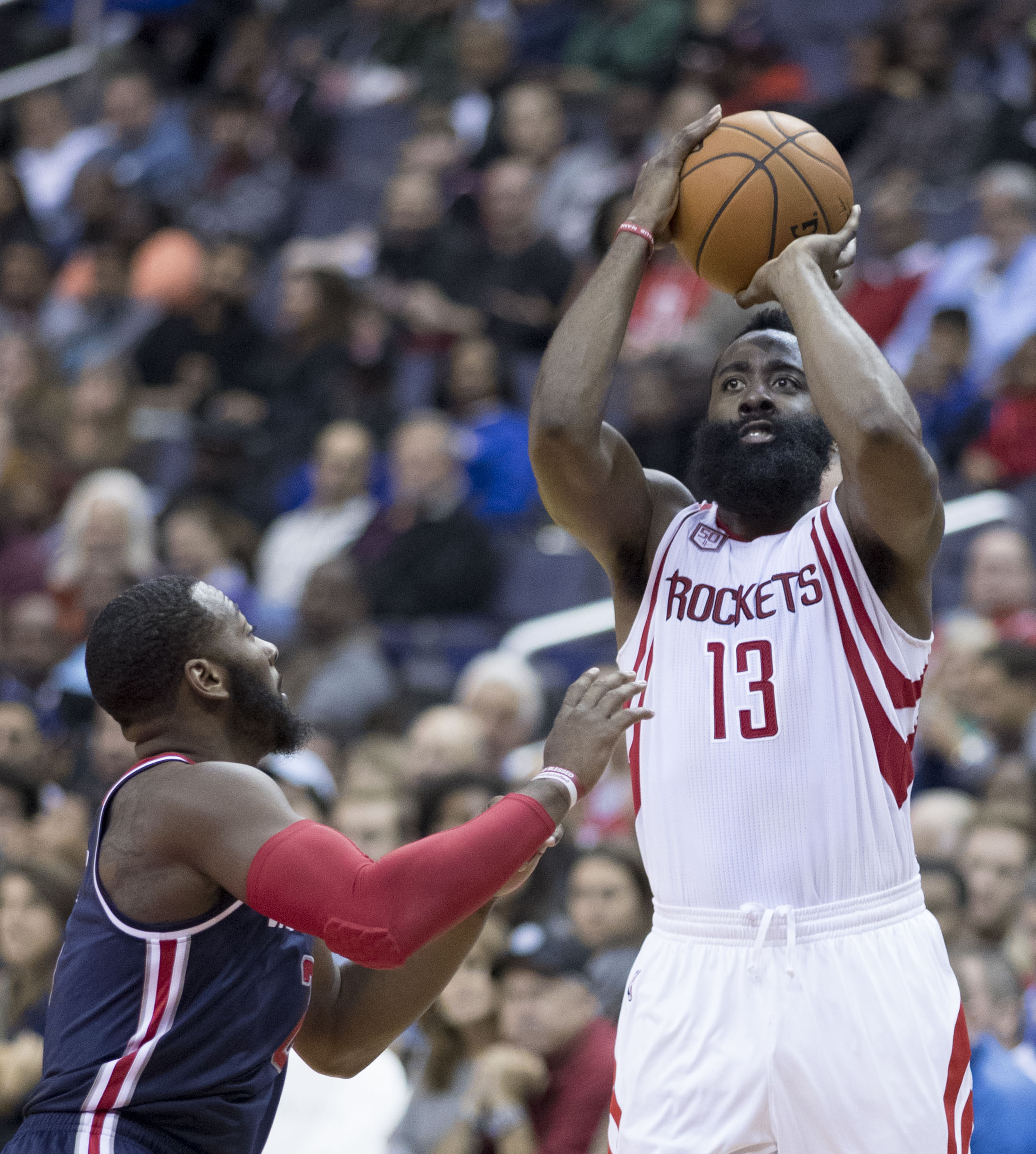
Harden shoots over John Wall in 2016

On July 9, 2016, Harden signed a four-year, $118.1 million contract extension with the Rockets. In September 2016, new Rockets head coach Mike D'Antoni announced that Harden would take on the point guard role to begin the 2016–17 season. In the Rockets' season opener on October 26, Harden had 34 points, a career-high 17 assists, and eight rebounds in a 120–114 loss to the Los Angeles Lakers, becoming just the second player in NBA history to record at least 30 points and 15 assists in an opener; Tim Hardaway had 32 and 18 for the Golden State Warriors in 1990.

On December 14, he recorded 15 points, 14 assists and 11 rebounds against the Sacramento Kings, the 14th triple double of his career, tying him with Hakeem Olajuwon for most in franchise history. He set the franchise record two days later in the Rockets' 122–110 win over the New Orleans Pelicans, Harden helped the team set an NBA-record with 24 three-pointers, as he finished with 29 points, 11 rebounds and 13 assists. On December 23, he tied a career high with 17 assists in a 115–109 loss to the Memphis Grizzlies.

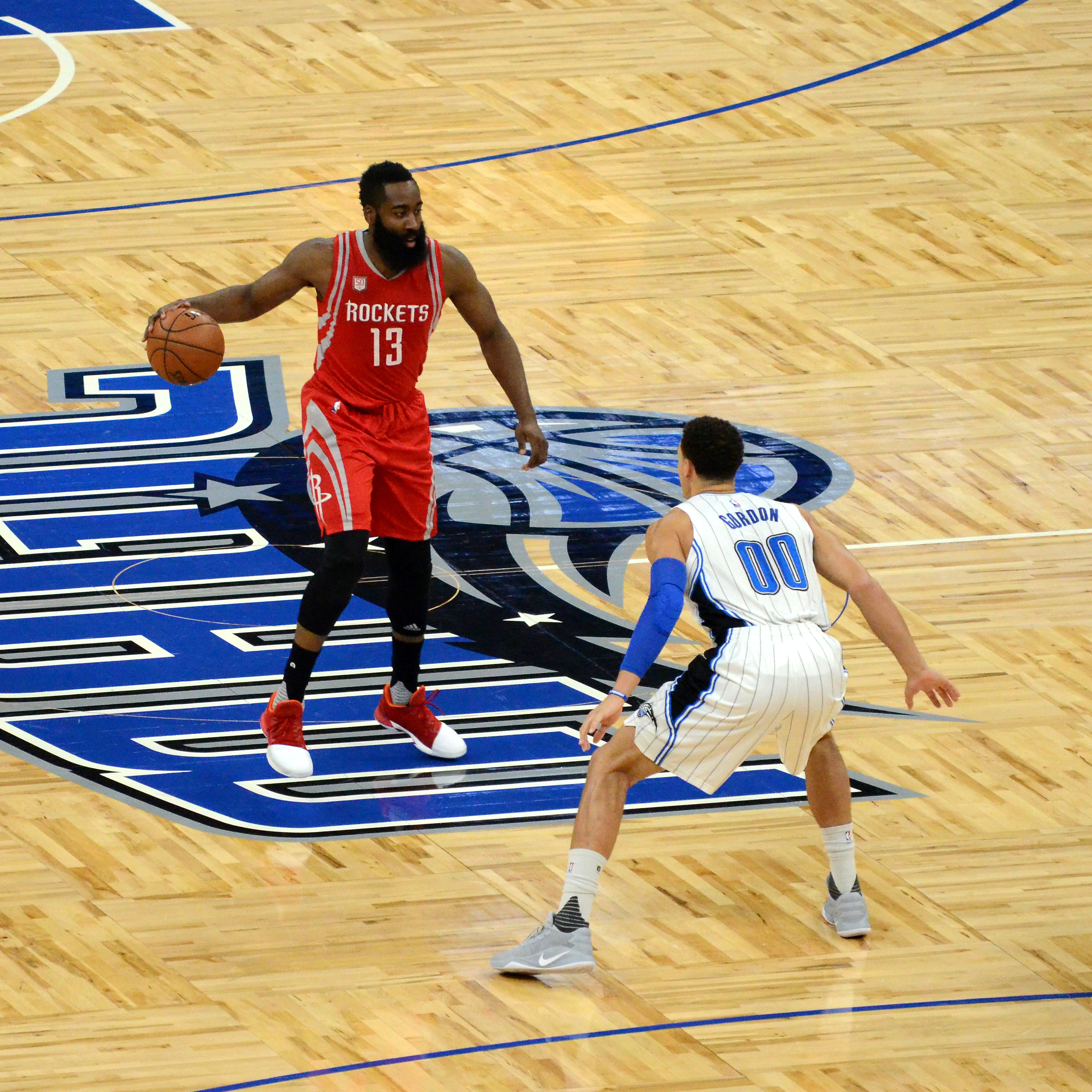
Harden with the ball in a game against the Orlando Magic in 2017

On December 31, 2016, Harden recorded another triple-double with 53 points, 17 assists and 16 rebounds in a 129–122 win over the New York Knicks, becoming the first player in NBA history to finish with a 50–15–15 stat line. He tied Wilt Chamberlain for the most points in a triple-double in NBA history—Chamberlain pulled the feat during the 1967–68 season, with 53 points, 32 rebounds and 14 assists. Harden set career highs for points and three-pointers (with nine) and matched his career best for assists. It was his 17th career triple-double and his fourth career 50-point game.

Two days later, he recorded his ninth triple-double of the season in a win over the Washington Wizards and was named Western Conference Player of the Week for a third time. It was Harden's 12th Player of the Week honor, matching Hakeem Olajuwon for the most Player of the Week awards in franchise history. Harden's career-best December run earned him Western Conference Player of the Month honors.

His 10th and 11th triple-doubles on January 8 and 10 in Rockets wins saw him become the fourth player in NBA history with at least 40 points, 10 rebounds and 10 assists in consecutive games—Pete Maravich, Michael Jordan and Russell Westbrook are the three others to do it. On January 27, he recorded his 14th triple-double of the season with 51 points, 13 rebounds and 13 assists in a 123–118 win over the Philadelphia 76ers, becoming the first player in NBA history with multiple 50-point triple-doubles in a season. On February 3 against the Chicago Bulls, Harden scored his 10,000th point as a Rocket, passing Yao Ming for sixth place in franchise history.

On February 11, he scored 40 points in three quarters (his ninth 40-point game of the season) to help the Rockets win 133–102 over the Phoenix Suns. He played just 29 minutes against the Suns to become the first Rockets player since Sleepy Floyd in 1991 to score 40 points in less than 30 minutes. Between March 12 and 18, he had four straight triple-doubles, giving him 19 for the season. He finished the regular season with 22 triple-doubles and became the first player in NBA history to finish the regular season with at least 2,000 points (2,356), 900 assists (907) and 600 rebounds (659). He also ended the regular season as the league leader in assists, averaging 11.2 assists per game. He placed second in league MVP voting to former teammate Westbrook.

In Game 5 of the Rockets' second round playoff series against the San Antonio Spurs, Harden recorded his second career postseason triple-double with 33 points, 10 rebounds and 10 assists in a 110–107 overtime loss; the loss saw the Rockets go down 3–2 in the series. The Rockets were eliminated by the Spurs with a 114–75 loss in Game 6. Harden tied his season low of 10 points, shooting 2-of-11 before fouling out with 3:15 remaining.

==== 2017–2018: MVP season and scoring title ====
On July 8, 2017, Harden signed a four-year contract extension with the Rockets for approximately $160 million, giving him a total six-year deal with $228 million guaranteed—the richest contract in NBA history. On November 5, he scored a career-high 56 points in a 137–110 win over the Utah Jazz, falling just shy of Calvin Murphy's 57-point franchise record set in 1978. Harden joined Wilt Chamberlain as the only players in NBA history to have at least 10 assists and shoot better than 75 percent from the field in a 50-point performance. He went on to become the first player in team history to score at least 20 points in each of the team's first 20 games of a season. Harden was named Western Conference Player of the Month for games played in October and November, marking the fifth time Harden has received the honor, all coming as a Rocket. On December 9, he scored 48 points against the Portland Trail Blazers to become only the second player to score at least 20 points in each of the first 24 games since the 1990–91 season.

On December 20, despite Harden's 51 points, the Rockets were defeated 122–116 by the Los Angeles Lakers, ending their 14-game winning streak. Harden set a franchise record by scoring at least 20 points in his 30th straight game. The previous record was held by Malone, who did it in 29 straight games in the 1981–82 season. Two days later, Harden had a second straight 51-point performance in a 128–118 loss to the Los Angeles Clippers. It was Harden's third 50-point game of the season and he became the first player in franchise history to have two straight 50-point games. He also became the first NBA player to score 50 or more in consecutive games since Kobe Bryant did so in four straight in March 2007. On December 31 against the Lakers, Harden left with a hamstring injury late in the fourth quarter. Without Harden, the Rockets won 148–142 in double overtime. The following day, he was ruled out for two weeks with a Grade 2 hamstring strain. He missed seven games as a result. On January 26, Harden moved into second in Rockets history in assists with 3,347, passing Allen Leavell's 3,339.

On January 30, in a 114–107 win over the Orlando Magic, Harden became the first player in NBA history to score 60 points as part of a triple-double, finishing with 10 rebounds and 11 assists for his third triple-double of the season. Harden scored 18 points in the fourth quarter to eclipse the 57 points Calvin Murphy scored in 1978 to break Houston's single-game scoring record. It was his fourth 50-point game of the season and bested his previous career high of 56 points set in November against Utah. On March 25, he helped the Rockets reach 60 wins in a season for the first time in franchise history, recording a triple-double (fourth of season, 35th of career) with 18 points, 15 assists and 10 rebounds in three quarters in a 118–99 win over the Atlanta Hawks. The Rockets finished the regular season as the No. 1 seed for the first time in franchise history, with a franchise-best 65–17 record. Harden won his first scoring title, averaging 30.4 points per game, second in franchise history to Malone's 31.1 in 1981–82.

In Game 1 of the Rockets' first-round playoff series against the Minnesota Timberwolves, Harden scored 44 points in a 104–101 win. In Game 1 of their second-round series against the Jazz, Harden scored 41 points in a 110–96 win. It was his sixth 40-point playoff game of his career. In Game 1 of the Western Conference Finals, Harden scored 41 points in a 119–106 loss to the Golden State Warriors. In Game 4 against the Warriors, Harden scored a game-high 30 points to help the Rockets even the series at 2–2 with a 95–92 win. In Game 6, he recorded 32 points, nine assists and seven rebounds in a 115–86 loss.

Despite a 32-point effort from Harden in Game 7, the Rockets were eliminated from the playoffs with a 101–92 defeat. He was only 2-of-13 on 3-pointers, and Houston made just 7 of 44, including 27 straight misses. In June, Harden was named the NBA Most Valuable Player for the 2017–18 season, becoming the third player in franchise history to receive the award, joining Moses Malone (1978–79 and 1981–82) and Hakeem Olajuwon (1993–94). That same month, he was voted the National Basketball Players Association's MVP for the 2017–18 season, earning the honor for a second time.

==== 2018–2019: Career high in scoring ====
The Rockets started the season with an 11–14 record. By the end of December, Harden had carried the Rockets to a 21–15 record with fellow All-Star Chris Paul out with a hamstring injury. On January 11, he had 43 points, 10 rebounds and 12 assists in a 141–113 win over the Cleveland Cavaliers. He also made eight 3-pointers to extend his NBA record to 12 games in a row with at least five. It was Harden's 13th game of the season with 40 points, surpassing Malone's franchise record, and his seventh in the previous nine games as he continued to carry the team with Paul and Eric Gordon out with injuries.

On January 23, Harden scored a career-high 61 points to go with 15 rebounds in a 114–110 win over the New York Knicks, thus setting the fourth-longest streak for 30-point games in NBA history at 21—at the time, Wilt Chamberlain held the three longer streaks (65, 31 and 25). With 43 points against the Utah Jazz on February 2, Harden set the third-longest streak in NBA history for games with 30-plus points. On February 21, in the Rockets' first game after the All-Star break, Harden scored 30 points against the Los Angeles Lakers for his 32nd consecutive game with 30-plus points, surpassing Chamberlain's for the second-longest streak in league history.

After missing the Rockets' next game with an illness and a strained neck, his return game on February 25 saw him score 28 points against the Atlanta Hawks, snapping his 32-game streak with at least 30. On March 19, he scored 31 points in a win against the Hawks and became the first player in NBA history to score 30 or more points against all 29 other teams in a single season. On March 20, he scored 57 points in a 126–125 overtime loss to the Memphis Grizzlies, marking his seventh 50-point game of the season. Two days later, he matched his career high with 61 points, including 27 in the first quarter, to lead the Rockets to a 111–105 victory over the San Antonio Spurs. For these performances, he received his fourth Western Conference Player of the Week honor of the 2018–19 season.

On March 31, Harden had 50 points, 11 rebounds and 10 assists in a 119–108 win over the Sacramento Kings to record his ninth 50-point game of the regular season. It was his fifth career 50-point triple-double, the most of any player in NBA history. He also became the ninth player in NBA history to make 2,000 3-pointers in their career. After a 135–103 victory against the Los Angeles Clippers on April 3, he became the third person in NBA history to record 2,700+ points and 500+ assists in a single season.

In a 149–113 blowout win against the Phoenix Suns on April 7, Harden's 30-point, 13-rebound, nine-assist, and two-steal performance matched and broke several records: he tied Kobe Bryant for the most 30-point games in one season for any NBA player in the past 30 years with 56 games; became the second player in NBA History (Michael Jordan, 1989–90) to record 2,700 points, 500 assists, and 500 rebounds in one season; and joined Michael Jordan as the only player to average at least 30 points, seven assists, five rebounds and two steals in one season. He finished the season with the largest scoring margin (8.1 points per game) over the second-leading scorer since Wilt Chamberlain in 1962–63.

Harden led the Rockets to a Game 2 win against the Utah Jazz with 32 points, 13 rebounds, and 10 assists—his third career triple-double during the postseason—to give the Rockets a 2–0 series lead in the first round. In Game 3 against the Jazz, he had one of the worst shooting nights of his career when he started the game 0-of-15, a figure breaking the NBA playoff record for most missed consecutive shots without a make in a game since Michael Jordan went 0-of-11 in an 87–80 loss against the Miami Heat in the 1997 Eastern Conference Finals. However, he finished the game with 22 points on 3-of-20 shooting, 10 assists, six steals, and four rebounds to lead the Rockets to a 104–101 win, putting the series at 3–0. The Rockets went on to lose 4–2 to the Warriors in the conference semifinals. At the season's end, he was unanimously selected to his fifth All-NBA First Team, and he was announced a finalist for the MVP award.

==== 2019–2021: Third consecutive scoring title and trade request ====
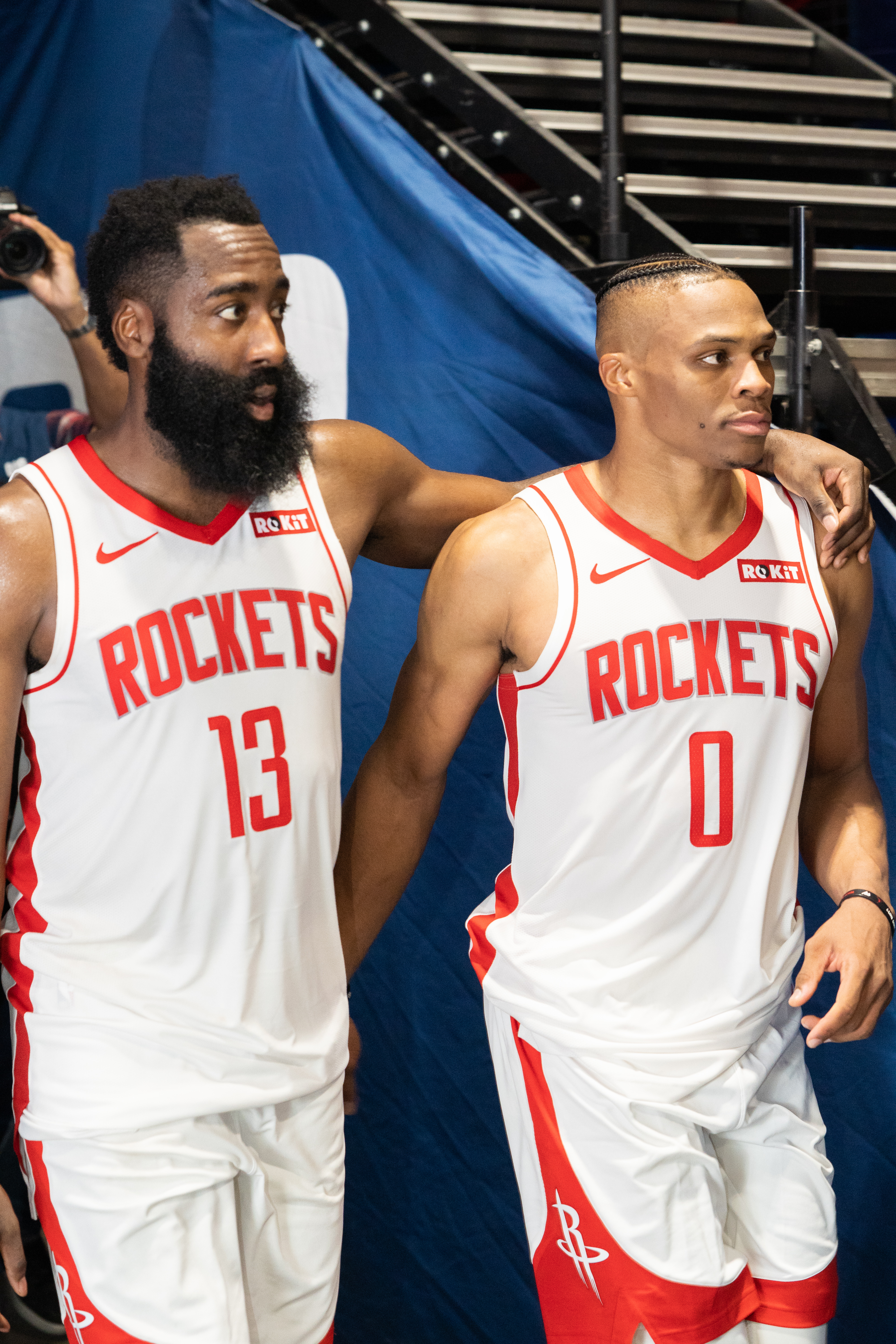
Former Thunder teammate Russell Westbrook joined Houston in 2019–20.

After a disappointing start to the season shooting 28.6% from the field and 15% from the three-point line in the first three games, Harden scored 59 points on 18–32 shooting from the field, along with nine assists in a 159–158 win against the Washington Wizards on October 30, 2019—two points away from his career-high. With this game, Harden extended a streak of having a 50-point game in 6 straight seasons, the 2nd-longest streak in NBA history behind Wilt Chamberlain (10 straight seasons, 1959–69). On November 11, 2019, he was named the Western Conference's Player of the Week after the Rockets went 3–0, Harden recording a double-double in each game and averaging 40.7 points, scoring 22 3-pointers on 43.1% shooting; 9.3 assists; 8.0 rebounds; 2.33 steals; and 1.33 blocks.

Harden has scored a total of 334 points in 318 minutes of play this season, the highest total through the first nine games of a season since Michael Jordan scored 337 in 1988–89. Harden, at this point in the season, hit 39 3-pointers, marking the fourth-highest total through the first nine games of a season and the most by a player besides Stephen Curry. On November 30, 2019, in a 158–111 blowout win against the Atlanta Hawks, Harden got his fourth career 60-point game—tied for third-most with Michael Jordan—with a season-high 60 points along with 8 assists in 31 minutes. With this game, Harden joins Klay Thompson and Kobe Bryant as the only players to hit 60 points in just three quarters. His 24 shot attempts are the fewest ever in a 60-point game in NBA history.

On December 11, 2019, Harden got his fourth 50-point game of the season with 55 points on an efficient 20-of-34 field goal shooting and 10-of-18 from three in a 116–110 win against the Cleveland Cavaliers. He became the fourth player in NBA history with multiple games of 10 or more 3-pointers, joining Stephen Curry (15), Klay Thompson (5), and J.R. Smith (3). He continued his scoring rampage in the following 130–107 win against the Orlando Magic on December 13, 2019, where he got his second 50-point game in a row—the third time in his career where he has scored back-to-back 50-point games—with 54 points on 19-of-31 field goal shooting and 10-of-15 from three, in addition to seven assists, and five rebounds. In this game, Harden became the second player in NBA history to score 10+ 3PM in consecutive games, joining Stephen Curry, who did this in February 2016, and he also passed Paul Pierce for eighth in the all-time career three-pointers made list.

He also became the first player in NBA history to have 50+ points and 10+ 3PM in back-to-back games. Before those last two performances, only three times had a player attempted seven or less free throws while scoring 54 or more points in a game; Harden did it twice that week. On December 21, 2019, Harden passed Elgin Baylor for most 40-point games in NBA history with 40 points a 139–125 win against the Phoenix Suns. He became the Western Conference player of the month for December for his historical and efficient scoring tear during the month. He finished the decade as the NBA's leading scorer with 19,578 points going back to January 1, 2010, despite beginning his career as a sixth man with the Oklahoma City Thunder.

In the Rockets’ first game after the suspension of the season due to COVID-19, Harden became the second highest scorer in franchise history after a 49 point, 9 rebound, 8 assist, 3 steal, 3 block, and 1 turnover performance on 70% shooting from the field in a 153–149 comeback overtime victory over the Dallas Mavericks. During the 2018–2020 seasons, Harden became the first player since Wilt Chamberlain with at least 20 games of 40+ points over a three-year period. He became the league's scoring champion for the third season in a row and the league leader in total steals. He additionally became a finalist for the MVP award and was named to the NBA's All-Seeding First Team. Houston was eliminated from the playoffs in the second round by the Lakers.

During the off-season, general manager Morey and head coach D'Antoni left the Rockets. Harden demanded a trade in November 2020, and reported to training camp late. On December 26, he put up a season-high 44 points and tied a career-high 17 assists in a 128–126 overtime loss to the Portland Trail Blazers.

=== Brooklyn Nets (2021–2022) ===
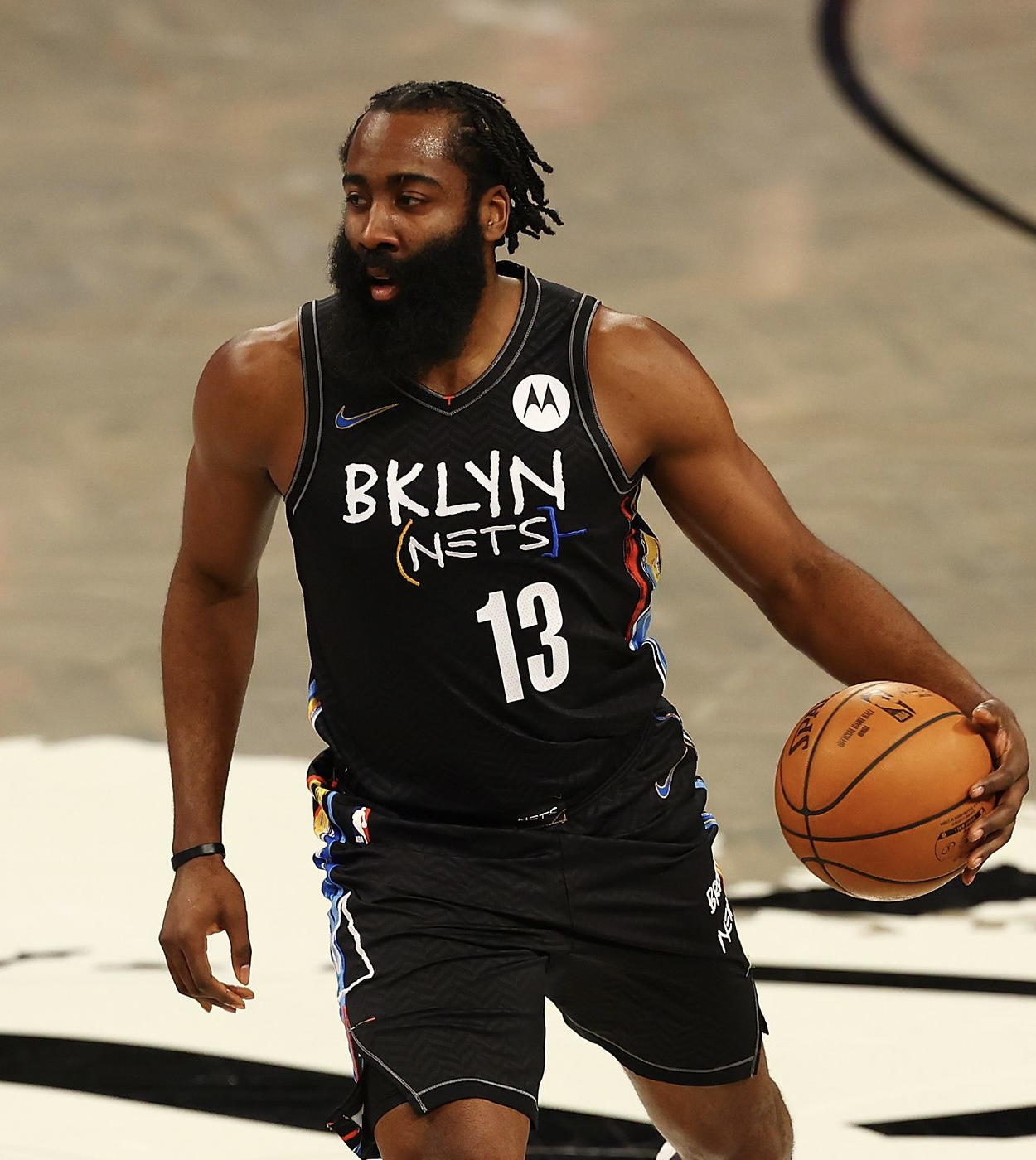
Harden on the Nets wearing their "city edition" jersey

Near the end of 2020, Harden requested a trade to the Brooklyn Nets, intending to form a superteam with former teammate Kevin Durant and Kyrie Irving. On January 14, 2021, Harden was traded to the Nets in a four-team deal which involved the Cleveland Cavaliers and Indiana Pacers, sending Rodions Kurucs, Dante Exum, Victor Oladipo, four first-round draft picks and four first-round pick swaps to the Rockets. On January 16, he recorded 32 points, 12 rebounds and 14 assists in a 122–115 win over the Orlando Magic, becoming the first player in franchise history and the seventh player in NBA history to log a triple-double in their team debut. Harden also set the record for being the first player in NBA history to post a 30-point triple-double debut performance, while also setting a franchise record for the most assists in a player's first game with the Nets.

On February 2, Harden earned his first Eastern Conference Player of the Week honor, after logging a double-double average with 25.3 points and 11.3 assists over three games. On February 19, Harden posted a double-double with 23 points and 11 assists in a 108–98 win over the Los Angeles Lakers, becoming the first player in franchise history to log a double-double in eleven consecutive games. On February 22, Harden was named Eastern Conference Player of the Week, after leading the Nets to four straight wins. He averaged 31.8 points, 9.0 rebounds, 10.8 assists and 1.3 steals per game. The following day, Harden was named an Eastern Conference reserve for the 2021 NBA All-Star Game, marking his ninth consecutive All-Star selection.

On March 1, Harden logged his seventh career triple-double as a Net with 30 points, 15 assists and 14 rebounds in a 124–113 overtime victory against the San Antonio Spurs, giving the franchise their first win in San Antonio in 19 years. In his efforts, Harden became the first player in league history to post a 30–15–10 stat line with zero turnovers in a game since individual turnovers were first tracked during the 1977–78 season. The following day, Harden was named Eastern Conference Player of the Month for the month of February. The honor was the eleventh of his career and first as a Net, making him the first Net to win the award since Vince Carter in April 2007. Harden led the franchise to an Eastern Conference-best 9–4 record in February, recording averages of 25.6 points, 8.8 rebounds, an Eastern Conference-leading 10.7 assists and 1.2 steals in 36.8 minutes per game. On March 13, Harden logged his ninth triple-double as a Net with 24 points, 10 rebounds and 10 assists in a 100–95 win against the Detroit Pistons, surpassing Larry Bird on the league's all-time scoring list. He now sits at 34th overall with 21,792 points, one more point than Bird.

On March 15, Harden registered his tenth triple-double as a Net with 21 points, 15 assists and 15 rebounds in a 117–112 victory against the New York Knicks, becoming the first player in franchise history to log at least 15 points, 15 rebounds and 15 assists in a game. On March 17, Harden posted a season-high 40 points, 10 rebounds and 15 assists in a 124–115 win over the Indiana Pacers, joining Carter as the only Nets players with a 40-point triple-double. He also became the fourth player in NBA history with 100 40-point games and became second all-time in 40-point triple-doubles with 16, behind only Oscar Robertson who had 24. In his efforts, Harden's first two points of the game give him 21,815 points in his career, moving him past Gary Payton into 33rd overall in the league's all-time scoring list while his fourth assist of the first quarter was the 5,637th of his career, moving him past Chauncey Billups into 45th place in the NBA's all-time assist leader. On March 26, Harden, who missed a game against the Utah Jazz due to neck soreness, returned to the Nets and logged a season-high 44 points, 14 rebounds and eight assists in a 113–111 win over the Detroit Pistons.

On March 29, Harden logged his twelfth triple-double in 32 games as a Net with 38 points, 11 rebounds and 13 assists in a 112–107 victory against the Minnesota Timberwolves, tying Jason Kidd's franchise record for triple-doubles in a season who did it twice in 80 and 51 games, respectively. On April 1, Harden was named Eastern Conference Player of the Month for the month of March. The honor was Harden's second as a Net, becoming the first player in league history to earn Player of the Month honors in each of his first two full months with a new team since the award's inception in 1979–80. He also set a record for being the first player in franchise history to earn Player of the Month honors in consecutive months.

Harden led the Nets to an NBA-best 11–2 record in March, recording averages of 27.9 points on 43.8 percent shooting from the field and 87.7 percent shooting from the free-throw line, 9.8 rebounds, 11.5 assists, 1.6 steals in 38.8 minutes per game. Harden's franchise-record six triple-doubles of the month carried the Nets into first place in the Eastern Conference for the first time since 2003. After missing 18 games due to a strained hamstring, Harden returned to action on May 12. Coming off the bench for the first time since 2012, Harden posted a double-double with 18 points and 11 assists in a 128–116 win over the San Antonio Spurs.

In Game 5 of the first round of the playoffs, Harden posted a triple-double with 34 points, 10 rebounds, and 10 assists in a 123–109 win to close out the series. In the first minute of Game 1 against the Milwaukee Bucks in the conference semifinals, Harden re-injured his hamstring and missed the remainder of the game, as well as the next three games of the series. Harden made his return in Game 5 of the series, a 114–108 comeback win. In Game 7, Harden had 22 points, 9 rebounds, and 9 assists in the 111–115 overtime loss.

On October 22, 2021, Harden put up 20 points, seven rebounds and eight assists in a 114–109 win over the Philadelphia 76ers, moving past Kyle Korver for fourth on the all-time three-pointers made list. On November 12, Harden had a season-high 39 points, 5 rebounds and 12 assists in a 120–112 win over the New Orleans Pelicans. On November 19, Harden recorded 36 points, 10 rebounds and 8 assists in a 115–113 win against the Orlando Magic. On December 14, Harden entered health-and-safety protocols, causing him to miss the next three games.

Harden made his return against the Los Angeles Lakers on December 25, where he recorded 36 points, 10 rebounds, 10 assists and 3 blocks in the 122–115 win. On December 27, Harden had 39 points, 8 rebounds and a season-high 15 assists in a 124–108 win over the Los Angeles Clippers. On January 15, 2022, Harden had 27 points, 8 rebounds and tied a season-high 15 assists in a 120–105 win over the New Orleans Pelicans. On January 21, Harden scored 37 points, grabbed 10 rebounds and dished out 11 assists in a 117–102 win over the San Antonio Spurs. On February 3, Harden was named an Eastern Conference reserve for the 2022 NBA All-Star Game, making his tenth straight All-Star selection.

=== Philadelphia 76ers (2022–2023) ===
On February 10, 2022, the Nets traded Harden and Paul Millsap to the Philadelphia 76ers in exchange for Ben Simmons, Seth Curry, Andre Drummond, and two first-round selections. Harden switched to No. 1 from the No. 13 he had worn through his entire professional career up to that point, as No. 13 was retired by the 76ers for Wilt Chamberlain. On February 25, Harden made his Sixers debut, putting up 27 points, 12 assists, and eight rebounds in a 133–102 win over the Minnesota Timberwolves. In the following game on February 27, Harden logged his 68th career triple-double and first as a 76er with a season-high 16 assists to go with his 29 points, 10 rebounds and five steals in a 125–109 win against the New York Knicks. He became the first player in NBA history to record 25-plus points and 10 or more assists in his first two games with a new team. On March 10, in a game against the Nets, Harden made his 2,561st career three-pointer to pass Reggie Miller (2,560) for third place in total NBA career three-pointers made, behind Ray Allen and Stephen Curry.

On April 16, during Game 1 of the first round of the playoffs, Harden recorded a double-double of 22 points and 14 assists in a 131–111 win over the Toronto Raptors. On April 28, Harden had 22 points, 6 rebounds and 15 assists in a 132–97 Game 6 win, to help the Sixers advance to East semifinals. On May 8, Harden had 31 points, seven rebounds and nine assists in a 116–108 Game 4 win over the Miami Heat. Harden scored 16 of his 31 points in the fourth quarter to tie the series at 2–2. Philadelphia was eliminated by Miami in Game 6, when Harden scored 11 points and committed four turnovers. His last basket came with 3:31 left in the second quarter.

On July 27, 2022, Harden re-signed with the 76ers on a two-year, $68.6 million deal which includes a player option for the 2023–24 season. On December 9, Harden scored 28 points and delivered 12 assists in a 134–133 overtime win over the Los Angeles Lakers. He joined LeBron James, Russell Westbrook and Oscar Robertson as the only players in NBA history with 23,000 career points and 6,500 career assists. On December 23, Harden put up a triple-double with 20 points, 21 assists, and 11 rebounds in a 119–114 win over the Los Angeles Clippers. He joined Wilt Chamberlain as the only players in Sixers history to put up a 20-assist triple-double and his 21 assists tied Chamberlain and Maurice Cheeks for the most assists in a game in Sixers history. On February 23, Harden posted 31 points, seven rebounds and seven assists in a 110–105 win over the Memphis Grizzlies.

He passed Allen Iverson for No. 26 on the league's all-time scoring list. On March 6, Harden recorded his second 20-assist game of his career with a near triple-double, recording 14 points and nine rebounds to go along with the 20 assists in a victory over the Indiana Pacers. It was also the second time during the season where Joel Embiid recorded 40+ points to go along with Harden's 20+ assists, marking it the first time in NBA history being done by a pair of teammates multiple times in the same season. On April 9, Harden ended the regular season as the league leader in assists, averaging 10.7 assists per game. He also joined Joel Embiid as the first pair of teammates to lead the NBA in scoring and assists in a season since George Gervin and Johnny Moore did so in the 1981–82 season.

In Game 1 of the Eastern Conference Semifinals, Harden tied a playoff career high 45 points in a 119–115 victory against the Boston Celtics. He hit a go-ahead three-pointer in the final seconds of the fourth in a game heavily favored towards Boston due to an injury to Joel Embiid. In Game 4, Harden put up 42 points, eight rebounds, nine assists, four steals, one block, and a game-winning three-pointer in a 116–115 overtime win. He also joined Jerry West, Michael Jordan, and Kobe Bryant as the only guards in NBA history to put up at least 10 40-point playoff games. The 76ers eventually lost the series to the Celtics in seven games.

Following the 2022–23 season, Harden picked up his $35.6 million option to remain with the 76ers but eventually requested a trade. After trade talks with the Los Angeles Clippers stalled, Harden stated "Daryl Morey is a liar and I will never be a part of an organization that he's a part of".

=== Los Angeles Clippers (2023–2026) ===
==== 2023–24 season ====
On November 1, 2023, the Los Angeles Clippers acquired Harden, P. J. Tucker, and Filip Petrušev from the 76ers in exchange for Marcus Morris Sr., Nicolas Batum, Kenyon Martin Jr. and Robert Covington. As part of the trade, the Clippers dealt a first-round pick, two second-round picks, a pick swap, and cash considerations to the 76ers, while sending a pick swap and cash considerations to the Oklahoma City Thunder. The trade reunited Harden with Russell Westbrook for the second time in their careers.

Harden made his Clippers debut on November 6 against the New York Knicks, finishing with 17 points and six assists in 31 minutes as the Clippers lost 111–97. On November 17, Harden put up 24 points, nine rebounds, seven assists, and a game-winning three-pointer in a 106–100 win over the Houston Rockets. On December 14, Harden posted 28 points, 15 assists, seven rebounds and four blocks in a 121–113 win over the Golden State Warriors. He became the 24th player in NBA history to score 25,000 career points. On December 18, Harden scored 21 of his season-high 35 points in the fourth quarter, and dished out nine assists on 12-of-16 shooting, 8-of-11 from three, 3-of-3 from the free throw line in a 151–127 win over the Indiana Pacers.

On January 26, 2024, Harden recorded his 75th career triple-double with 26 points, 10 rebounds and 13 assists in a 127–107 win over the Toronto Raptors. On February 2, Harden and Russell Westbrook became the third pair of 25,000-point scorers to play together in NBA history in a 136–125 win over the Detroit Pistons. They joined LeBron James and Carmelo Anthony for the 2021–22 Lakers and Kevin Garnett and Paul Pierce for the 2013–14 Nets. On March 17, Harden passed Vince Carter for the 20th place on the league's all-time scoring list. On April 4, in a game against the Denver Nuggets, Harden became the fourth player in NBA history to achieve at least 25,000 career points, 7,000 career assists, and 6,000 career rebounds, joining LeBron James, Oscar Robertson, and Russell Westbrook.

==== 2024–25 season ====
On July 10, 2024, Harden re-signed with the Clippers on a two-year, $70 million contract.

On November 2, 2024, Harden recorded his 78th career triple-double, tying Wilt Chamberlain for seventh in NBA history, as he finished with 25 points, 10 rebounds and 13 assists in a 125–119 loss against the Phoenix Suns. He also became the 20th player in NBA history to reach 26,000 points in his career. On November 15, Harden tied Ray Allen's record of second place in total NBA career three-pointers made, behind Stephen Curry, in a 125–104 loss against his former team the Houston Rockets. On November 17, Harden broke a tie with Ray Allen to solely secure second place in total NBA career three-pointers made, behind Stephen Curry, in a game against the Utah Jazz. On November 27, Harden put up 43 points in a 121–96 win over the Washington Wizards. It was his 100th career 40-point game, joining Wilt Chamberlain, Michael Jordan, and Kobe Bryant as the only players in NBA history with at least 100 40-point games. On December 1, Harden posted a near triple-double with 39 points, 9 rebounds and 11 assists in a 126–122 win over the Denver Nuggets. He also scored his 3,000th career three-pointer, joining Curry as the only players to reach the milestone.

On January 30, 2025, Harden was named as reserve for the 2025 NBA All-Star Game, his eleventh selection. On February 20, Harden had 24 points, five rebounds and eight assists in a 116–110 loss against the Milwaukee Bucks. He became the 13th player in NBA history to score 27,000 career points. On March 5, Harden posted his first 50-point game since 2019 in a 123–115 win over the Detroit Pistons. On April 11, Harden logged his 80th career triple-double with 23 points, 11 rebounds and 10 assists in 101–100 win over the Sacramento Kings. On April 13, Harden recorded 39 points, seven rebounds, 10 assists, two steals and two blocks in a 124–119 overtime win over the Golden State Warriors in the regular-season finale to clinch the No. 5 seed in the Western Conference. He scored 12 of the Clippers' 13 overtime points. Harden started 79 games for the Clippers during the 2024–25 NBA season, averaging 22.8 points, 5.8 rebounds, and 8.7 assists.

==== 2025–26 season ====
On June 29, 2025, Harden declined his player option and re-signed with Los Angeles on a new two-year, $81.5 million contract.

On November 10, Harden posted a triple-double with 35 points (including 19 in the fourth quarter), 10 rebounds, and 11 assists in a 105–102 loss to the Atlanta Hawks. On November 14, Harden had his 82nd career triple-double, recording 41 points, 14 rebounds, and 11 assists in a 133–127 double-overtime victory over the Dallas Mavericks. At 36 years and 81 days old, he became the oldest player in NBA history to record a 40‑point triple‑double, surpassing Larry Bird. Harden has the most triple-doubles in Clippers franchise history as well as the first 40-point triple-double in franchise history. On November 17, Harden scored 28 points in a 110–108 loss to the Philadelphia 76ers. He became the 11th player in NBA history to eclipse 28,000 career points. On November 22, Harden scored a Clippers franchise record 55 points—tied by Kawhi Leonard just over a month later—including a franchise record for first-quarter points with 27, while tying his career high with 10 three-pointers in a 131–116 victory over the Charlotte Hornets. He is now the only player to hold the single-game scoring record for multiple franchises. Harden also joined Stephen Curry, LeBron James, and Kobe Bryant as the only players with a 55+ point game at age 36 or older. This marked Harden’s 25th game scoring 50 or more points, tying Kobe Bryant for third place all-time.

On December 6, Harden put up 34 points in a 109–106 loss to the Minnesota Timberwolves. He also moved past Carmelo Anthony for 10th on the league’s all-time scoring list. On December 20, Harden recorded a double-double with 21 points and 10 assists in a 103–88 win over the Los Angeles Lakers. He surpassed Andre Miller to move into 12th place on the NBA’s all-time assists list. On January 12, Harden posted 32 points and 10 assists in a 117–109 win over the Hornets. He passed Shaquille O’Neal to move into 9th place on the NBA’s all-time scoring list. Harden started 44 games for Los Angeles during the 2025–26 season, posting averages of 25.4 points, 4.8 rebounds, and 8.1 assists.

=== Cleveland Cavaliers (2026–present) ===
On February 4, 2026, the Cleveland Cavaliers acquired Harden from the Clippers in exchange for Darius Garland and a second-round pick. On February 7, Harden made his Cavaliers debut, putting up 23 points, with 15 scored in the fourth quarter, and eight assists in a 132–126 win over the Sacramento Kings. On February 24, in a win against the New York Knicks, Harden had sustained a fracture in his right thumb. Despite having the fracture, Harden claims how he will play through the injury. On March 8, Harden scored 21 points along with five rebounds and five assists in the Cavaliers’ 115–101 victory over the Philadelphia 76ers, surpassing the 29,000-point mark for his NBA career and becoming the ninth player in league history to reach the milestone.

On August 20, 2026, the Cavaliers and Harden agreed to a three-year, $97 million contract extension to remain with the team. On September 8, Harden officially signed the extension.

On November 20, 2026, Harden scored 51 points, along with six rebounds and six assists, in a 128–119 win over the Indiana Pacers. It marked his 26th career 50-point game, surpassing Kobe Bryant (25) for the third-most 50-point games in NBA history.

== Player profile ==
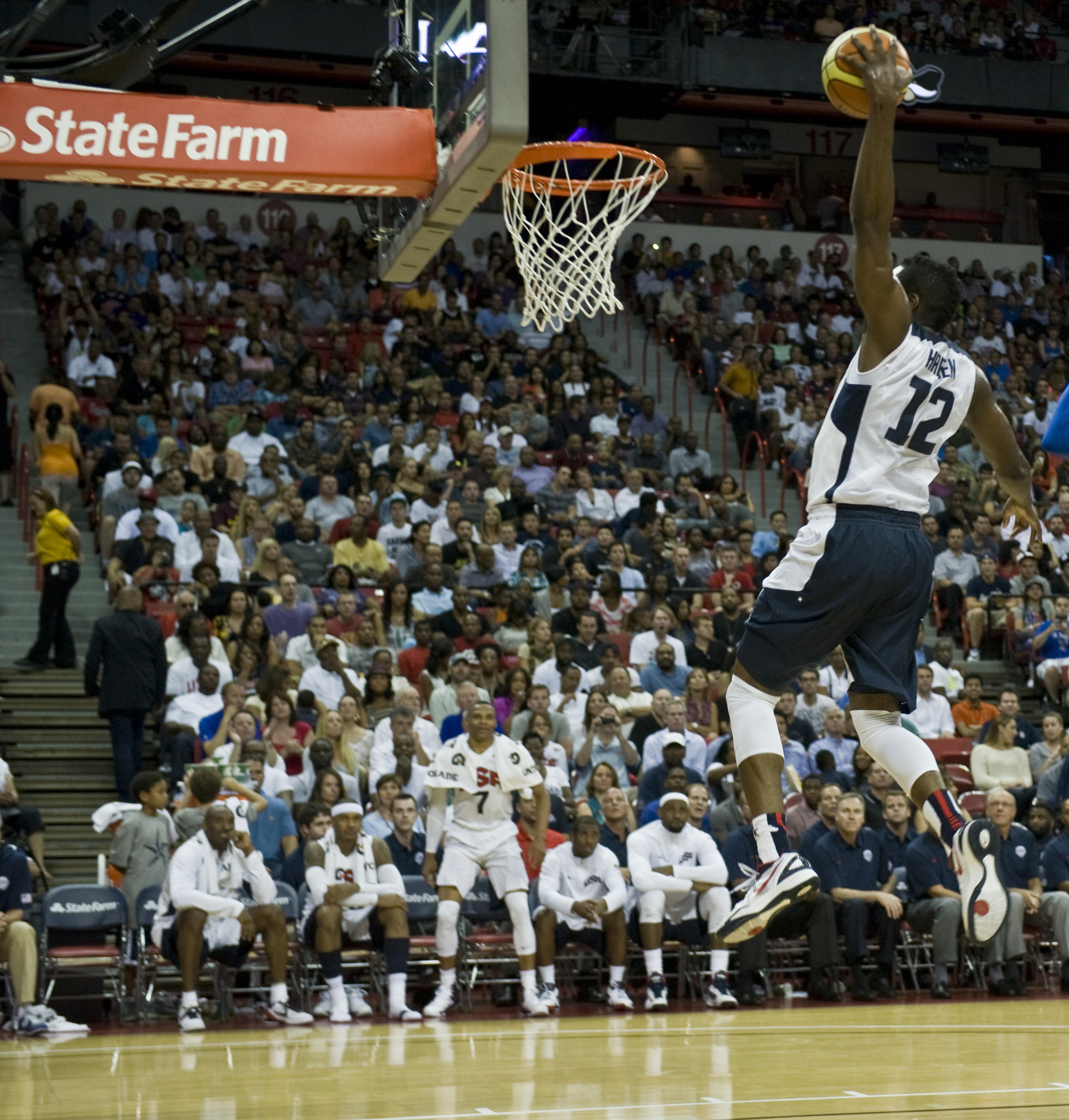
Harden dunking during a 2012 Team USA exhibition game against the Dominican Republic national team

Standing at 6 feet 4 inches tall (1.93 m) and weighing 220 pounds (100 kg), Harden plays mostly at the shooting guard position, but he is capable of playing the point guard position. He is the highest all-time left-handed scorer in NBA history. With season averages of over 25 points per game from the 2012–13 season to the 2019-2020 season, Harden is considered one of the most versatile and dangerous scorers in the NBA. ESPN named him the 5th best shooter in the NBA throughout the entire 2010s decade. He possesses a wide array of offensive moves; two of the most prominent among them being his Euro step and his step-back jumper.

Since his trade to the Houston Rockets in the 2012–13 NBA season, he has scored the most points in the NBA. He is the all-time NBA leader in unassisted three-point makes. He has also gained notoriety for his ability to exploit league rules in order to more efficiently draw fouls and get to the free throw line, from which he is a career 86.3% shooter. He is the all-time leader in 3-point shooting fouls drawn, and he led the NBA in free throw attempts and makes every year from the 2014–15 season until the 2019–20 season. Though primarily a scorer, Harden is also known for his playmaking ability, orchestrating the Rockets' offense with his elevated assist numbers. During the early portion of the 2016–17 season, Rockets head coach Mike D'Antoni played Harden at point guard, which resulted in him averaging over 10 assists per game for the first time in his career. He is also the all-time franchise leader in assists for the Rockets.

While he has garnered acclaim for his prowess on the offensive end, Harden has built a reputation as a poor defender. Criticism of his defense intensified in early 2014, when a video titled "James Harden: Defensive Juggernaut" featuring eleven minutes worth of clips of Harden conceding field goals, was circulated on the Internet. During the 2014 offseason, he committed to an improvement on defense, which manifested as early as August of that year as a member of the United States men's national basketball team. His improved defense carried over to the following season, and has been cited as a major reason for the Rockets' regular season success. Another negative aspect of his game that is sometimes brought up by pundits are his turnovers. Harden set the NBA record for turnovers during the 2015–16 season and broke it again the following season. Harden has also received criticism for not being clutch in key playoff games, notably losing all Game 7 matchups with four different teams. His 3-point percentage drops to 22.4% during those games.

== National team career ==
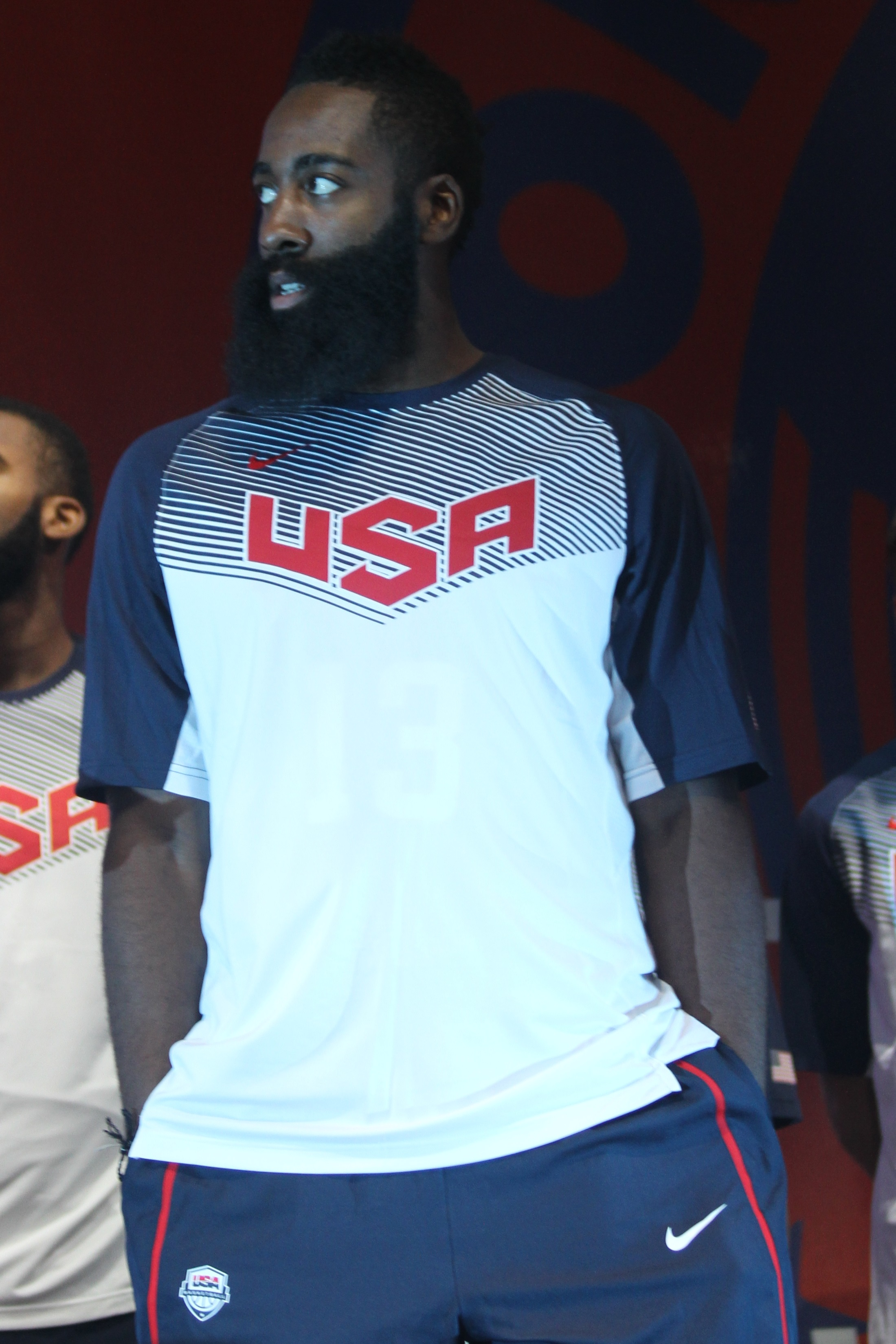
Harden with Team USA at the 2014 World Basketball Festival

Harden was a member of the United States national team that won a gold medal at the 2012 Olympics, and was also a member of the team that won the FIBA Basketball World Cup in 2014. Harden was a candidate for both the 2016 and 2020 Olympics, however, he withdrew from the team on both occasions, with his withdrawal in 2020 due to a hamstring injury sustained during the postseason.

== Awards and honors ==
NBA

- NBA Most Valuable Player: 2018
- 11× NBA All-Star: 2013–2022, 2025
- 8× All-NBA Team selections:
  - 6× First Team: 2014, 2015, 2017–2020
  - 2× Third Team: 2013, 2025
- NBA Sixth Man of the Year: 2012
- 3× NBA scoring champion: 2018–2020
- 2× NBA assists leader: 2017, 2023
- 3× NBA three-point scoring leader: 2018–2020
- 7× NBA free throw scoring leaders: 2013, 2015–2020
- NBA minutes played leaders: 2016
- NBA All-Rookie Second Team: 2010
- NBA Bubble All-Seeding Games First Team: 2020
- NBA 75th Anniversary Team

USA Basketball

- Olympics gold medalist: 2012
- FIBA World Cup gold medalist: 2014

== Career statistics ==
Legend
GP	Games played	GS	Games started	MPG	Minutes per game
FG%	Field goal percentage	3P%	3-point field goal percentage	FT%	Free throw percentage
RPG	Rebounds per game	APG	Assists per game	SPG	Steals per game
BPG	Blocks per game	PPG	Points per game	**Bold**	Career high
*	Led the league

=== NBA ===
==== Regular season ====
Year	Team	GP	GS	MPG	FG%	3P%	FT%	RPG	APG	SPG	BPG	PPG
2009–10	Oklahoma City	76	0	22.9	.403	.375	.808	3.2	1.8	1.1	.3	9.9
2010–11	Oklahoma City	**82**	5	26.7	.436	.349	.843	3.1	2.1	1.1	.3	12.2
2011–12	Oklahoma City	62	2	31.4	**.491**	.390	.846	4.1	3.7	1.0	.2	16.8
2012–13	Houston	78	78	**38.3**	.438	.368	.851	4.9	5.8	1.8	.5	25.9
2013–14	Houston	73	73	38.0	.456	.366	.866	4.7	6.1	1.6	.4	25.4
2014–15	Houston	81	81	36.8	.440	.375	.868	5.7	7.0	1.9	.7	27.4
2015–16	Houston	**82***	**82***	38.1*	.439	.359	.860	6.1	7.5	1.7	.6	29.0
2016–17	Houston	81	81	36.4	.440	.347	.847	8.1	**11.2***	1.5	.5	29.1
2017–18	Houston	72	72	35.4	.449	.367	.858	5.4	8.8	1.8	.7	30.4*
2018–19	Houston	78	78	36.8	.442	.368	.879	6.6	7.5	**2.0**	.7	**36.1***
2019–20	Houston	68	68	36.5	.444	.355	.865	6.6	7.5	1.8	**.9**	34.3*
2020–21	Houston	8	8	36.3	.444	.347	.883	5.1	10.4	.9	.8	24.8
2020–21	Brooklyn	36	35	36.6	.471	.366	.856	**8.5**	10.9	1.3	.8	24.6
2021–22	Brooklyn	44	44	37.0	.414	.332	.869	8.0	10.2	1.3	.7	22.5
2021–22	Philadelphia	21	21	37.7	.402	.326	.892	7.1	10.5	1.2	.2	21.0
2022–23	Philadelphia	58	58	36.8	.441	.385	.867	6.1	10.7*	1.2	.5	21.0
2023–24	L.A. Clippers	72	72	34.3	.428	.381	.878	5.1	8.5	1.1	.8	16.6
2024–25	L.A. Clippers	79	79	35.3	.410	.352	.874	5.8	8.7	1.5	.7	22.8
2025–26	L.A. Clippers	44	44	35.4	.419	.347	**.901**	4.8	8.1	1.3	.4	25.4
2025–26	Cleveland	26	26	33.8	.466	**.435**	.840	4.8	7.7	.8	.5	20.5
Career		1,221	1,007	34.8	.439	.364	.863	5.6	7.3	1.5	.6	24.0
All-Star		10	6	24.7	.453	.418	.500	4.5	5.8	.7	.3	14.9

==== Playoffs ====
Year	Team	GP	GS	MPG	FG%	3P%	FT%	RPG	APG	SPG	BPG	PPG
2010	Oklahoma City	6	0	20.0	.387	.375	.842	2.5	1.8	1.0	.2	7.7
2011	Oklahoma City	17	0	31.6	.475	.303	.825	5.4	3.6	1.2	.8	13.0
2012	Oklahoma City	**20**	0	31.5	.435	**.410**	.857	5.1	3.4	1.6	.1	16.3
2013	Houston	6	6	40.5	.391	.341	.803	6.7	4.5	2.0	**1.0**	26.3
2014	Houston	6	6	**43.9**	.376	.296	.900	4.7	5.8	2.0	.2	26.8
2015	Houston	17	17	37.4	.439	.383	**.916**	5.7	7.5	1.6	.4	27.2
2016	Houston	5	5	38.6	.410	.310	.844	5.2	7.6	**2.4**	.2	26.6
2017	Houston	11	11	37.0	.413	.278	.878	5.5	8.5	1.9	.5	28.5
2018	Houston	17	17	36.5	.410	.299	.887	5.2	6.8	2.2	.6	28.6
2019	Houston	11	11	38.6	.413	.350	.837	**6.9**	6.6	2.2	.9	**31.6**
2020	Houston	12	12	37.3	**.478**	.333	.845	5.6	7.7	1.5	.8	29.6
2021	Brooklyn	9	9	35.7	.472	.364	.903	6.3	8.6	1.7	.7	20.2
2022	Philadelphia	12	12	39.9	.405	.368	.893	5.7	8.6	.8	.7	18.6
2023	Philadelphia	11	11	38.8	.393	.378	.873	6.2	8.3	1.8	.4	20.3
2024	L.A. Clippers	6	6	40.3	.449	.383	.906	4.5	8.0	1.0	**1.0**	21.2
2025	L.A. Clippers	7	7	39.4	.436	.364	.818	5.4	**9.1**	1.3	**1.0**	18.7
2026	Cleveland	18	**18**	37.3	.410	.299	.831	5.1	5.5	1.7	.7	19.2
Career		191	148	36.3	.424	.337	.866	5.4	6.4	1.6	.6	22.2

=== College ===
Year	Team	GP	GS	MPG	FG%	3P%	FT%	RPG	APG	SPG	BPG	PPG
2007–08	Arizona State	34	33	34.1	**.527**	**.407**	.754	5.3	3.2	**2.1**	**.6**	17.8
2008–09	Arizona State	**35**	**35**	**35.8**	.489	.356	**.756**	**5.6**	**4.2**	1.7	.3	**20.1**
Career		69	68	35.0	.506	.376	.755	5.4	3.7	1.9	.4	19.0

== Personal life ==
Harden is a Christian. He has talked about his faith, saying, "I just want to thank God for everything he has done in my life". Harden started growing his trademark beard in 2009 after being too lazy to shave. His beard has appeared in songs and T-shirts, and it earned him an endorsement and a unique candy with Trolli's where a depiction of his face and beard was shown on each gummy.

On August 3, 2015, the sports apparel company Adidas submitted an endorsement deal to Harden worth $200 million over the next 13 years. On July 18, 2019, Harden became a part owner in Houston's professional soccer teams; the Houston Dynamo of MLS and the Houston Dash of NWSL. Harden explained his decision by saying "Houston is my home now, and I saw this as a way to invest in my city and expand my business interests at the same time". as well as "This is my city and I'm here to stay".

Harden revealed on the TV series Starting 5 that he has a son named Jace.

On June 13, 2026, Harden was arrested for criminal possession of a weapon inside a motor vehicle in Houston, Texas. He was released on bond that banned him from possessing any weapon or ammunition and consuming alcohol, controlled substances, drugs, or marijuana. He was also ordered to submit to a random urinalysis and a court date was scheduled for June 22. In August 2026, all charges relating to the gun were dismissed by a Texas judge following Harden's completion of an alternative resolution program to avoid a criminal record.

=== Political views ===
On October 4, 2019, Houston Rockets general manager Daryl Morey issued a tweet that supported the 2019–20 Hong Kong protests. Morey's tweet resulted in the Chinese Basketball Association's suspension of its relationship with the Houston Rockets. Harden later apologized to China, saying, "We apologize. We love China."

On July 17, 2020, Harden was widely criticized and mocked online for wearing a pro-police mask, which has been said to be related to white supremacy and the Blue Lives Matter movement. Atlanta rapper Young Thug stated on Twitter that "he don't have internet" in defense of Harden and indicated that he had not been aware of the controversy. The interaction became a widely shared internet meme among social media users, specifically in online rap and NBA groups.

== See also ==
- List of NBA career scoring leaders
- List of NBA career assists leaders
- List of NBA career steals leaders
- List of NBA career turnovers leaders
- List of NBA career 3-point scoring leaders
- List of NBA career free throw scoring leaders
- List of NBA career free throw percentage leaders
- List of NBA career minutes played leaders
- List of NBA career triple-double leaders
- List of NBA career playoff scoring leaders
- List of NBA career playoff assists leaders
- List of NBA career playoff steals leaders
- List of NBA career playoff turnovers leaders
- List of NBA career playoff 3-point scoring leaders
- List of NBA career playoff free throw scoring leaders
- List of NBA career playoff games played leaders
- List of NBA career playoff minutes leaders
- List of NBA career playoff triple-double leaders
- List of NBA annual scoring leaders
- List of NBA annual assists leaders
- List of NBA annual 3-point scoring leaders
- List of NBA single-game scoring leaders
- List of NBA single-season scoring leaders
- List of NBA single-season 3-point scoring leaders
