= List of NBA career playoff minutes leaders =

This article provides two lists:

A list of National Basketball Association players by total career Playoffs minutes played.

A progressive list of playoffs minutes played leaders showing how the record increased through the years.

== Minutes played leaders ==
This section provides a list of National Basketball Association players by total career Playoffs minutes played.

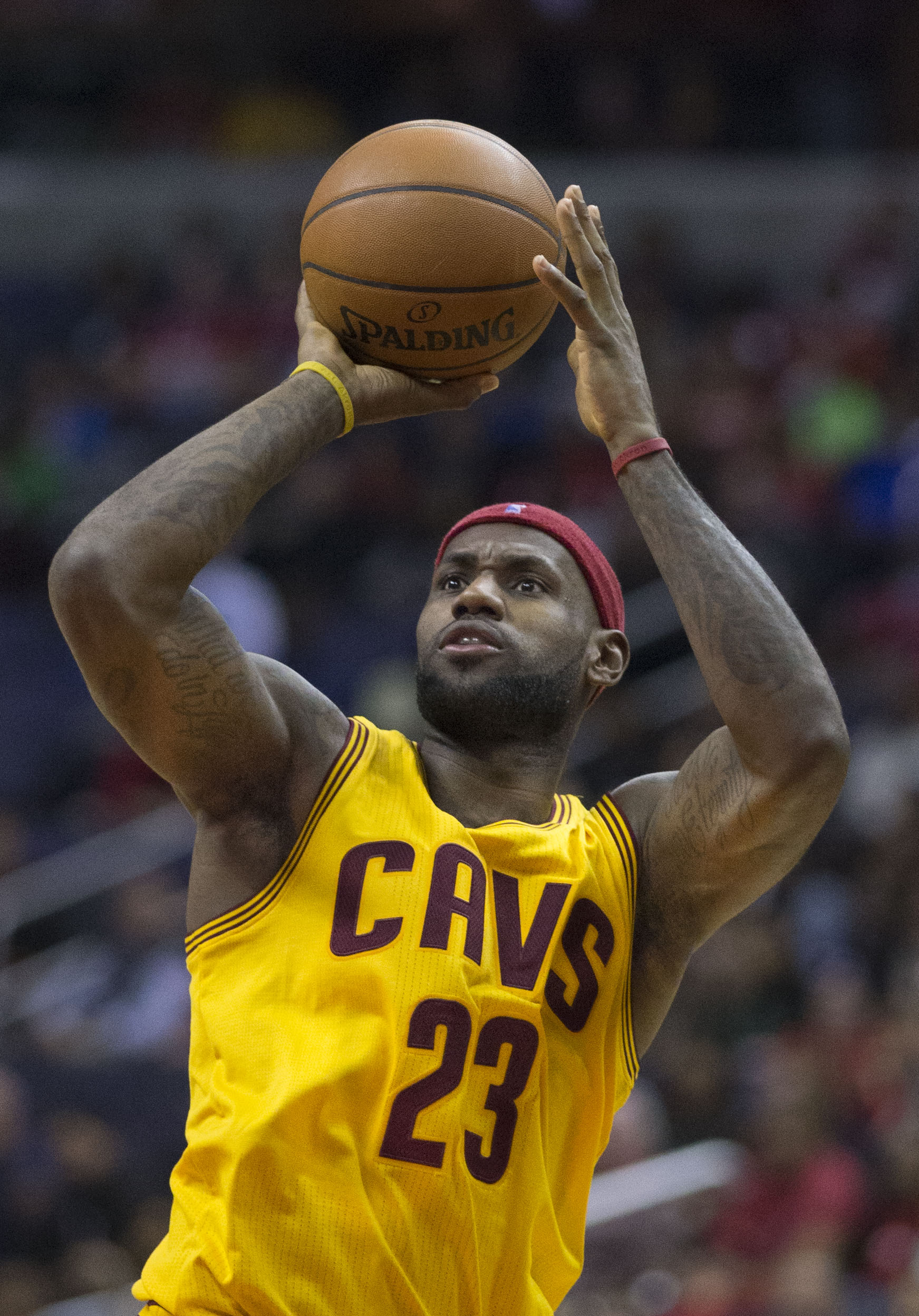
LeBron James has played the most minutes in NBA playoffs history.

Statistics accurate as of the 2026 NBA playoffs.

^	Active NBA player
*	Inducted into the Naismith Memorial Basketball Hall of Fame

Rank	Player	Position(s)	Playoff team(s) played for (years)	Total minutes	Games played	Minutes per game average
1	LeBron James^	SF	Cleveland Cavaliers (2006–2010, 2015–2018); Miami Heat (2011–2014); Los Angeles Lakers (2020–2021, 2023–2026)	12,446	302	41.2
2	Tim Duncan*	PF/C	San Antonio Spurs (1998–1999, 2001–2016)	9,370	251	37.3
3	Kareem Abdul-Jabbar*	C	Milwaukee Bucks (1969–1975); Los Angeles Lakers (1975–1989)	8,851	237	37.3
4	Kobe Bryant*	SG	Los Angeles Lakers (1997–2004, 2006–2012)	8,641	220	39.3
5	Scottie Pippen*	SF	Chicago Bulls (1987–1998); Houston Rockets (1999); Portland Trail Blazers (2000–2003)	8,105	208	39.0
6	Shaquille O'Neal*	C	Orlando Magic (1994–1996); Los Angeles Lakers (1997–2004); Miami Heat (2005–2007); Phoenix Suns (2008); Cleveland Cavaliers (2010); Boston Celtics (2011)	8,098	216	37.5
7	Karl Malone*	PF	Utah Jazz (1986–2003); Los Angeles Lakers (2004)	7,907	193	41.0
8	Tony Parker*	PG	San Antonio Spurs (2002–2018)	7,758	226	34.3
9	Wilt Chamberlain*	C	Philadelphia/San Francisco Warriors (1960–1962, 1964); Philadelphia 76ers (1965–1968); Los Angeles Lakers (1969–1973)	7,559	160	47.2
10	Magic Johnson*	PG	Los Angeles Lakers (1980–1991, 1996)	7,538	190	39.7
11	Bill Russell*	C	Boston Celtics (1957–1969)	7,497	165	45.4
12	Michael Jordan*	SG	Chicago Bulls (1985–1993, 1995–1998)	7,474	179	41.8
13	Dennis Johnson*	PG	Seattle SuperSonics (1978–1980); Phoenix Suns (1981–1983); Boston Celtics (1984–1990)	6,994	180	38.9
14	James Harden^	SG/PG	Oklahoma City Thunder (2010–2012); Houston Rockets (2013–2020); Brooklyn Nets (2021); Philadelphia 76ers (2022–2023); Los Angeles Clippers (2024–2025); Cleveland Cavaliers (2026)	6,940	191	36.3
15	Kevin Durant^	SF/PF	Oklahoma City Thunder (2010–2014, 2016); Golden State Warriors (2017–2019); Brooklyn Nets (2021–2022); Phoenix Suns (2023–2024); Houston Rockets (2026)	6,934	171	40.5
16	Larry Bird*	SF/PF	Boston Celtics (1980–1988, 1990–1992)	6,886	164	42.0
17	John Havlicek*	SF	Boston Celtics (1963–1969, 1972–1977)	6,860	172	39.9
18	Derek Fisher	PG/SG	Los Angeles Lakers (1997–2004, 2008–2011); Utah Jazz (2007); Oklahoma City Thunder (2012–2014)	6,856	259	26.5
19	Robert Horry	PF/SF	Houston Rockets (1993–1996); Los Angeles Lakers (1997–2003); San Antonio Spurs (2004–2008)	6,823	244	28.0
20	Dwyane Wade*	SG	Miami Heat (2004–2007, 2009–2014, 2016, 2018); Chicago Bulls (2017)	6,697	177	37.8
21	Al Horford^	C	Atlanta Hawks (2008–2013, 2015–2016); Boston Celtics (2017–2019, 2022–2025); Philadelphia 76ers (2020)	6,643	197	33.7
22	John Stockton*	PG	Utah Jazz (1985–2003)	6,398	182	35.2
23	Jerry West*	PG	Los Angeles Lakers (1961–1974)	6,321	153	41.3
24	Paul Pierce*	SF	Boston Celtics (2002–2005, 2008–2013); Brooklyn Nets (2014); Washington Wizards (2015); Los Angeles Clippers (2016)	6,229	170	36.6
25	Robert Parish*	C	Golden State Warriors (1977); Boston Celtics (1981–1993); Charlotte Hornets (1995); Chicago Bulls (1997)	6,177	184	33.6
Rank	Player	Position(s)	Playoff team(s) played for (years)	Total minutes	Games played	Minutes per game average

== Progressive list of playoff minutes played ==
This is a progressive list of minutes played leaders showing how the record has increased through the years.

Statistics accurate as of the 2026 NBA playoffs.

^	Active NBA player
*	Inducted into the Naismith Memorial Basketball Hall of Fame

Team abbreviationsTeam listed is the one player was on when he established the record
BAL	Baltimore Bullets	FTW	Fort Wayne Pistons	OKC	Oklahoma City Thunder	SEA	Seattle SuperSonics
BOS	Boston Celtics	GSW	Golden State Warriors	ORL	Orlando Magic	SFW	San Francisco Warriors
CHO	Charlotte Hornets	HOU	Houston Rockets	PHI	Philadelphia 76ers	STL	St. Louis Hawks
CHI	Chicago Bulls	LAL	Los Angeles Lakers	PHW	Philadelphia Warriors	SYR	Syracuse Nationals
CLE	Cleveland Cavaliers	MIA	Miami Heat	PHX	Phoenix Suns	TOR	Toronto Raptors
DAL	Dallas Mavericks	MNL	Minneapolis Lakers	POR	Portland Trail Blazers	UTA	Utah Jazz
DET	Detroit Pistons	NYK	New York Knicks	SAS	San Antonio Spurs	WSB	Washington Bullets

Leaders and records for playoff minutes played for every season
Season	Year-by-year leader	MP	Active leader	MP	Career record	MP	Single-season record	MP	Season
1951–52	George Mikan*MNL	553	George Mikan*MNL	553	George Mikan*MNL	553	George Mikan*MNL	553	1951–52
1952–53	George Mikan*MNL	463	George Mikan*MNL	1,016	George Mikan*MNL	1,016	George Mikan*MNL	553	1952–53
1953–54	Paul SeymourSYR	559	Slater Martin*; MNL 1953–56; STL 1957–59	1,509	Slater Martin*; MNL 1953–56; STL 1957–59	1,509	Paul SeymourSYR	559	1953–54
1954–55	Andy Phillip*FTW	445	Slater Martin*; MNL 1953–56; STL 1957–59	1,824	Slater Martin*; MNL 1953–56; STL 1957–59	1,824	Paul SeymourSYR	559	1954–55
1955–56	Paul Arizin*PHW	409	Slater Martin*; MNL 1953–56; STL 1957–59	1,945	Slater Martin*; MNL 1953–56; STL 1957–59	1,945	Paul SeymourSYR	559	1955–56
1956–57	Bob Cousy*BOS	440	Slater Martin*; MNL 1953–56; STL 1957–59	2,384	Slater Martin*; MNL 1953–56; STL 1957–59	2,384	Paul SeymourSYR	559	1956–57
1957–58	Bob Cousy*BOS	457	Slater Martin*; MNL 1953–56; STL 1957–59	2,800	Slater Martin*; MNL 1953–56; STL 1957–59	2,800	Paul SeymourSYR	559	1957–58
1958–59	Elgin Baylor*MNL	556	Slater Martin*; MNL 1953–56; STL 1957–59	2,818	Slater Martin*; MNL 1953–56; STL 1957–59	2,818	Paul SeymourSYR	559	1958–59
1959–60	Bob Pettit*STL	576	Bob Cousy*BOS	2,916	Bob Cousy*BOS	2,916	Bob Pettit*STL	576	1959–60
1960–61	Elgin Baylor*LAL	540	Bob Cousy*BOS	3,253	Bob Cousy*BOS	3,253	Bob Pettit*STL	576	1960–61
1961–62	Bill Russell*BOS	672	Bob Cousy*BOS	3,727	Bob Cousy*BOS	3,727	Bill Russell*BOS	672	1961–62
1962–63	Bill Russell*BOS	617	Bob Cousy*BOS	4,120	Bob Cousy*BOS	4,120	Bill Russell*BOS	672	1962–63
1963–64	Wilt Chamberlain*SFW	558	Bill Russell*BOS	4,034	Bob Cousy*BOS	4,120	Bill Russell*BOS	672	1963–64
1964–65	Bill Russell*BOS	561	Bill Russell*BOS	4,595	Bill Russell*BOS	4,595	Bill Russell*BOS	672	1964–65
1965–66	Bill Russell*BOS	814	Bill Russell*BOS	5,409	Bill Russell*BOS	5,409	Bill Russell*BOS	814	1965–66
1966–67	Wilt Chamberlain*SFW	718	Bill Russell*BOS	5,799	Bill Russell*BOS	5,799	Bill Russell*BOS	814	1966–67
1967–68	Bill Russell*BOS	869	Bill Russell*BOS	6,668	Bill Russell*BOS	6,668	Bill Russell*BOS	869	1967–68
1968–69	John Havlicek*BOS	850	Bill Russell*BOS	7,497	Bill Russell*BOS	7,497	Bill Russell*BOS	869	1968–69
1969–70	Wilt Chamberlain*LAL	851	Elgin Baylor*LAL	5,510	Bill Russell*BOS	7,497	Bill Russell*BOS	869	1969–70
1970–71	Wes Unseld*BAL	759	Wilt Chamberlain*LAL	6,055	Bill Russell*BOS	7,497	Bill Russell*BOS	869	1970–71
1971–72	Jerry Lucas*NYK	737	Wilt Chamberlain*LAL	6,758	Bill Russell*BOS	7,497	Bill Russell*BOS	869	1971–72
1972–73	Wilt Chamberlain*LAL	801	Wilt Chamberlain*LAL	7,559	Wilt Chamberlain*LAL	7,559	Bill Russell*BOS	869	1972–73
1973–74	John Havlicek*BOS	811	Jerry West*LAL	6,321	Wilt Chamberlain*LAL	7,559	Bill Russell*BOS	869	1973–74
1974–75	Elvin Hayes*WSB	751	John Havlicek*BOS	5,980	Wilt Chamberlain*LAL	7,559	Bill Russell*BOS	869	1974–75
1975–76	Dave Cowens*BOS	798	John Havlicek*BOS	6,485	Wilt Chamberlain*LAL	7,559	Bill Russell*BOS	869	1975–76
1976–77	Doug CollinsPHI	759	John Havlicek*BOS	6,860	Wilt Chamberlain*LAL	7,559	Bill Russell*BOS	869	1976–77
1977–78	Marvin WebsterSEA	904	John Havlicek*BOS	6,860	Wilt Chamberlain*LAL	7,559	Marvin WebsterSEA	904	1977–78
1978–79	Bob Dandridge*WSB	787	Wes Unseld*WSB	4,802	Wilt Chamberlain*LAL	7,559	Marvin WebsterSEA	904	1978–79
1979–80	Julius Erving*PHI	694	Wes Unseld*WSB	4,889	Wilt Chamberlain*LAL	7,559	Marvin WebsterSEA	904	1979–80
1980–81	Moses Malone*HOU	955	Wes Unseld*WSB	4,889	Wilt Chamberlain*LAL	7,559	Moses Malone*HOU	955	1980–81
1981–82	Julius Erving*PHI	780	Kareem Abdul-Jabbar*LAL	4,769	Wilt Chamberlain*LAL	7,559	Moses Malone*HOU	955	1981–82
1982–83	Magic Johnson*LAL	643	Kareem Abdul-Jabbar*LAL	5,357	Wilt Chamberlain*LAL	7,559	Moses Malone*HOU	955	1982–83
1983–84	Larry Bird*BOS	961	Kareem Abdul-Jabbar*LAL	6,124	Wilt Chamberlain*LAL	7,559	Larry Bird*BOS	961	1983–84
1984–85	Dennis Johnson*BOS	848	Kareem Abdul-Jabbar*LAL	6,734	Wilt Chamberlain*LAL	7,559	Larry Bird*BOS	961	1984–85
1985–86	Rodney McCrayHOU	835	Kareem Abdul-Jabbar*LAL	7,223	Wilt Chamberlain*LAL	7,559	Larry Bird*BOS	961	1985–86
1986–87	Larry Bird*BOS	1,015	Kareem Abdul-Jabbar*LAL	7,782	Kareem Abdul-Jabbar*; LAL	7,782	Larry Bird*BOS	1,015	1986–87
1987–88	Magic Johnson*LAL	965	Kareem Abdul-Jabbar*LAL	8,500	Kareem Abdul-Jabbar*; LAL	8,500	Larry Bird*BOS	1,015	1987–88
1988–89	Michael Jordan*CHI	718	Kareem Abdul-Jabbar*LAL	8,851	Kareem Abdul-Jabbar*; LAL	8,851	Larry Bird*BOS	1,015	1988–89
1989–90	Clyde Drexler*POR	853	Dennis Johnson*BOS	6,994	Kareem Abdul-Jabbar*; LAL	8,851	Larry Bird*BOS	1,015	1989–90
1990–91	Magic Johnson*LAL	823	Magic Johnson*LAL	7,403	Kareem Abdul-Jabbar*; LAL	8,851	Larry Bird*BOS	1,015	1990–91
1991–92	Michael Jordan*CHI	920	Larry Bird*BOS	6,886	Kareem Abdul-Jabbar*; LAL	8,851	Larry Bird*BOS	1,015	1991–92
1992–93	Dan Majerle PHX	1,071	Robert Parish*; BOS 1992–94; CHI 1994–95	6,088	Kareem Abdul-Jabbar*; LAL	8,851	Dan Majerle PHX	1,071	1992–93
1993–94	Patrick Ewing*NYK	1,032	Robert Parish*; BOS 1992–94; CHI 1994–95	6,088	Kareem Abdul-Jabbar*; LAL	8,851	Dan Majerle PHX	1,071	1993–94
1994–95	Hakeem Olajuwon*HOU	929	Robert Parish*; BOS 1992–94; CHI 1994–95	6,159	Kareem Abdul-Jabbar*; LAL	8,851	Dan Majerle PHX	1,071	1994–95
1995–96	Gary Payton*SEA	911	Magic Johnson*LAL	7,538	Kareem Abdul-Jabbar*; LAL	8,851	Dan Majerle PHX	1,071	1995–96
1996–97	Karl Malone*UTA	816	Michael Jordan*CHI	6,602	Kareem Abdul-Jabbar*; LAL	8,851	Dan Majerle PHX	1,071	1996–97
1997–98	Michael Jordan*CHI	872	Michael Jordan*CHI	7,474	Kareem Abdul-Jabbar*; LAL	8,851	Dan Majerle PHX	1,071	1997–98
1998–99	Allan Houston NYK	783	Scottie Pippen*; HOU 1998–99; POR 1999–03	7,200	Kareem Abdul-Jabbar*; LAL	8,851	Dan Majerle PHX	1,071	1998–99
1999–00	Shaquille O'Neal*LAL	1,000	Scottie Pippen*; HOU 1998–99; POR 1999–03	7,814	Kareem Abdul-Jabbar*; LAL	8,851	Dan Majerle PHX	1,071	1999–00
2000–01	Allen Iverson*PHI	1,016	Scottie Pippen*; HOU 1998–99; POR 1999–03	7,931	Kareem Abdul-Jabbar*; LAL	8,851	Dan Majerle PHX	1,071	2000–01
2001–02	Kobe Bryant*LAL	833	Scottie Pippen*; HOU 1998–99; POR 1999–03	8,030	Kareem Abdul-Jabbar*; LAL	8,851	Dan Majerle PHX	1,071	2001–02
2002–03	Tim Duncan*SAS	1,021	Scottie Pippen*; HOU 1998–99; POR 1999–03	8,105	Kareem Abdul-Jabbar*; LAL	8,851	Dan Majerle PHX	1,071	2002–03
2003–04	Kobe Bryant*LAL	973	Scottie Pippen*; HOU 1998–99; POR 1999–03	8,105	Kareem Abdul-Jabbar*; LAL	8,851	Dan Majerle PHX	1,071	2003–04
2004–05	Richard HamiltonDET	1,079	Shaquille O'Neal*; MIA 2004–07; PHO 2008–09; CLE 2010	6,813	Kareem Abdul-Jabbar*; LAL	8,851	Richard HamiltonDET	1,079	2004–05
2005–06	Dirk Nowitzki*DAL	983	Shaquille O'Neal*; MIA 2004–07; PHO 2008–09; CLE 2010	7,572	Kareem Abdul-Jabbar*; LAL	8,851	Richard HamiltonDET	1,079	2005–06
2006–07	LeBron James^CLE	893	Shaquille O'Neal*; MIA 2004–07; PHO 2008–09; CLE 2010	7,693	Kareem Abdul-Jabbar*; LAL	8,851	Richard HamiltonDET	1,079	2006–07
2007–08	Paul Pierce*BOS	990	Shaquille O'Neal*; MIA 2004–07; PHO 2008–09; CLE 2010	7,843	Kareem Abdul-Jabbar*; LAL	8,851	Richard HamiltonDET	1,079	2007–08
2008–09	Rashard LewisORL	986	Shaquille O'Neal*; MIA 2004–07; PHO 2008–09; CLE 2010	7,843	Kareem Abdul-Jabbar*; LAL	8,851	Richard HamiltonDET	1,079	2008–09
2009–10	Rajon RondoBOS	975	Shaquille O'Neal*; MIA 2004–07; PHO 2008–09; CLE 2010	8,086	Kareem Abdul-Jabbar*; LAL	8,851	Richard HamiltonDET	1,079	2009–10
2010–11	LeBron James^MIA	922	Kobe Bryant*LAL	8,165	Kareem Abdul-Jabbar*; LAL	8,851	Richard HamiltonDET	1,079	2010–11
2011–12	LeBron James^MIA	983	Kobe Bryant*LAL	8,641	Kareem Abdul-Jabbar*; LAL	8,851	Richard HamiltonDET	1,079	2011–12
2012–13	LeBron James^MIA	960	Kobe Bryant*LAL	8,641	Kareem Abdul-Jabbar*; LAL	8,851	Richard HamiltonDET	1,079	2012–13
2013–14	Kevin Durant^OKC	815	Tim Duncan*SAS	8,902	Tim Duncan*SAS	8,902	Richard HamiltonDET	1,079	2013–14
2014–15	LeBron James^CLE	844	Tim Duncan*SAS	9,152	Tim Duncan*SAS	9,152	Richard HamiltonDET	1,079	2014–15
2015–16	Draymond Green^GSW	879	Tim Duncan*SAS	9,370	Tim Duncan*SAS	9,370	Richard HamiltonDET	1,079	2015–16
2016–17	LeBron James^CLE	744	LeBron James^ CLE 2016–18; LAL 2018–26	9,127	Tim Duncan*SAS	9,370	Richard HamiltonDET	1,079	2016–17
2017–18	LeBron James^CLE	922	LeBron James^ CLE 2016–18; LAL 2018–26	10,049	LeBron James^ CLE 2017–18; LAL 2018–26	10,049	Richard HamiltonDET	1,079	2017–18
2018–19	Kawhi Leonard^TOR	939	LeBron James^ CLE 2016–18; LAL 2018–26	10,049	LeBron James^ CLE 2017–18; LAL 2018–26	10,049	Richard HamiltonDET	1,079	2018–19
2019–20	Jimmy Butler^MIA	806	LeBron James^ CLE 2016–18; LAL 2018–26	10,811	LeBron James^ CLE 2017–18; LAL 2018–26	10,811	Richard HamiltonDET	1,079	2019–20
2020–21	Khris Middleton^MIL	922	LeBron James^ CLE 2016–18; LAL 2018–26	11,035	LeBron James^ CLE 2017–18; LAL 2018–26	11,035	Richard HamiltonDET	1,079	2020–21
2021–22	Jayson Tatum^BOS	983	LeBron James^ CLE 2016–18; LAL 2018–26	11,035	LeBron James^ CLE 2017–18; LAL 2018–26	11,035	Richard HamiltonDET	1,079	2021–22
2022–23	Jimmy Butler^MIA	874	LeBron James^ CLE 2016–18; LAL 2018–26	11,654	LeBron James^ CLE 2017–18; LAL 2018–26	11,654	Richard HamiltonDET	1,079	2022–23
2023–24	Luka Dončić^DAL	899	LeBron James^ CLE 2016–18; LAL 2018–26	11,858	LeBron James^ CLE 2017–18; LAL 2018–26	11,858	Richard HamiltonDET	1,079	2023–24
2024–25	Shai Gilgeous-Alexander^OKC	851	LeBron James^ CLE 2016–18; LAL 2018–26	12,062	LeBron James^ CLE 2017–18; LAL 2018–26	12,062	Richard HamiltonDET	1,079	2024–25
2025–26	Devin Vassell^SAS	801	LeBron James^ CLE 2016–18; LAL 2018–26	12,446	LeBron James^ CLE 2017–18; LAL 2018–26	12,446	Richard HamiltonDET	1,079	2025–26
Season	Year-by-year leader	MP	Active player leader	MP	Career record	MP	Single-season record	MP	Season

== See also ==
- List of NBA career minutes played leaders
- List of NBA annual minutes leaders
