= 2016 United States Olympic basketball team =

2016 United States Olympic basketball team may refer to:

- 2016 United States men's Olympic basketball team
- 2016 United States women's Olympic basketball team
