= 2020 United States women's Olympic basketball team =

- Head coach: Dawn Staley
- Scoring leader: Brittney Griner; A'ja Wilson 16.5
- Rebounding leader: Breanna Stewart 10.0
- Assists leader: Sue Bird 5.8
- Biggest win: 25 vs. Japan
- Biggest defeat: none

The 2020 United States women's Olympic basketball team competed in the Games of the XXXII Olympiad which were held in Tokyo, Japan, and were delayed a year until 2021 because of the COVID-19 pandemic. The U.S. women's Olympic team won their ninth gold medal, and seventh consecutive, at the event. The United States defeated Japan in the gold medal final en route to their eighth victory at the event. The team was led by Dawn Staley, three-time gold medalist with Team USA as a player.

== Roster ==
United States women's national basketball team – 2020 Summer Olympics roster
Players
Coaches

Pos.	No.	Name	Age – Date of birth	Height	Club	Ctr.
G	4	Jewell Loyd	27 – 5 October 1993	1.75 m (5 ft 9 in)	Seattle Storm	(United States)
G	5	Skylar Diggins-Smith	30 – 2 August 1990	1.75 m (5 ft 9 in)	Phoenix Mercury	(United States)
G	6	Sue Bird	40 – 16 October 1980	1.75 m (5 ft 9 in)	Seattle Storm	(United States)
G	7	Ariel Atkins	24 – 30 July 1996	1.73 m (5 ft 8 in)	Washington Mystics	(United States)
SG	8	Chelsea Gray	28 – 8 October 1992	1.80 m (5 ft 11 in)	Las Vegas Aces	(United States)
F	9	A'ja Wilson	24 – 8 August 1996	1.93 m (6 ft 4 in)	Las Vegas Aces	(United States)
PF	10	Breanna Stewart	26 – 27 August 1994	1.91 m (6 ft 3 in)	Seattle Storm	(United States)
SF	11	Napheesa Collier	24 – 23 September 1996	1.86 m (6 ft 1 in)	Minnesota Lynx	(United States)
SG	12	Diana Taurasi	39 – 11 June 1982	1.82 m (6 ft 0 in)	Phoenix Mercury	(United States)
C	13	Sylvia Fowles	35 – 6 October 1985	1.98 m (6 ft 6 in)	Minnesota Lynx	(United States)
C	14	Tina Charles	32 – 5 December 1988	1.93 m (6 ft 4 in)	Washington Mystics	(United States)
C	15	Brittney Griner	30 – 18 October 1990	2.03 m (6 ft 8 in)	Phoenix Mercury	(United States)

Head coach

- (United States) Dawn Staley

Assistant coach(es)

- (United States) Dan Hughes
- (United States) Cheryl Reeve
- (United States) Jennifer Rizzotti

Legend

- Club – describes last
  club before the tournament
- Age – describes age
  on July 26, 2021

== Results ==
=== Group stage ===
27 July 2021
13:40
v

Boxscore

Nigeria	72–81	United States
Scoring by quarter: 20–17, 12–27, 18–26, 22–11
Pts: Kalu 16; Rebs: Kunaiyi-Akpannah 9 Asts: Amukamara 4		Pts: Wilson 19; Rebs: Wilson 13; Asts: Bird 13

Saitama Super Arena, Saitama
Referees: Yu Jung (TPE), Scott Beker (AUS), Gizella Györgyi (NOR)

30 July 2021
13:40
v

Boxscore

United States	86–69	Japan
Scoring by quarter: 28–30, 21–10, 16–13, 21–16
Pts: Wilson 20; Rebs: Stewart 13; Asts: Bird, Stewart 6		Pts: Takada 15; Rebs: Akaho 8 Asts: Machida 11

Saitama Super Arena, Saitama
Referees: Yener Yılmaz (TUR), Yevgeniy Mikheyev (KAZ), Gizella Györgyi (NOR)

2 August 2021
13:40
v

Boxscore

France	82–93	United States
Scoring by quarter: 22–19, 22–31, 23–21, 15–22
Pts: Miyem 15; Rebs: Gruda 6 Asts: Johannès 7		Pts: Wilson 22; Rebs: Stewart, Wilson 7 Asts: Loyd 8

Saitama Super Arena, Saitama
Referees: Manuel Mazzoni (ITA), Ferdinand Pascual (PHI), Rabah Noujaim (LIB)

=== Quarterfinal ===
4 August 2021
17:20
v

Boxscore

Japan	86–85	Belgium
Scoring by quarter: 19–16, 22–26, 20–26, 25–17
Pts: Miyazawa 21; Rebs: Akaho 7 Asts: Machida 14		Pts: Meesseman 25; Rebs: Meesseman 11; Asts: Allemand 8

Saitama Super Arena, Saitama
Referees: Yu Jung (TPE), Amy Bonner (USA), James Boyer (AUS)

=== Semifinal ===
6 August 2021
13:40
v

Boxscore

United States	79–59	Serbia
Scoring by quarter: 25–12, 16–11, 17–16, 21–20
Pts: Griner 15; Rebs: Griner 12; Asts: Bird, Taurasi 4		Pts: Anderson 15; Rebs: Dugalić 10; Asts: Vasić 3

Saitama Super Arena, Saitama
Referees: Antonio Conde (ESP), Yu Jung (TPE), Andreia Silva (BRA)

=== Gold Medal Final ===
8 August 2021
11:30
v

Boxscore

United States	90–75	Japan
Scoring by quarter: 23–14, 27–25, 25–17, 15–19
Pts: Griner 30; Rebs: Stewart 14; Asts: Taurasi 8		Pts: Takada 17; Rebs: Okoye 8 Asts: Machida 6

Saitama Super Arena, Saitama
Referees: Manuel Mazzoni (ITA), Andreia Silva (BRA), Maripier Malo (CAN)

== See also ==
- 2020 Summer Olympics
- Basketball at the 2020 Summer Olympics
- United States at the 2020 Summer Olympics
- United States women's national basketball team
