= 2023 FIBA Basketball World Cup Group P =

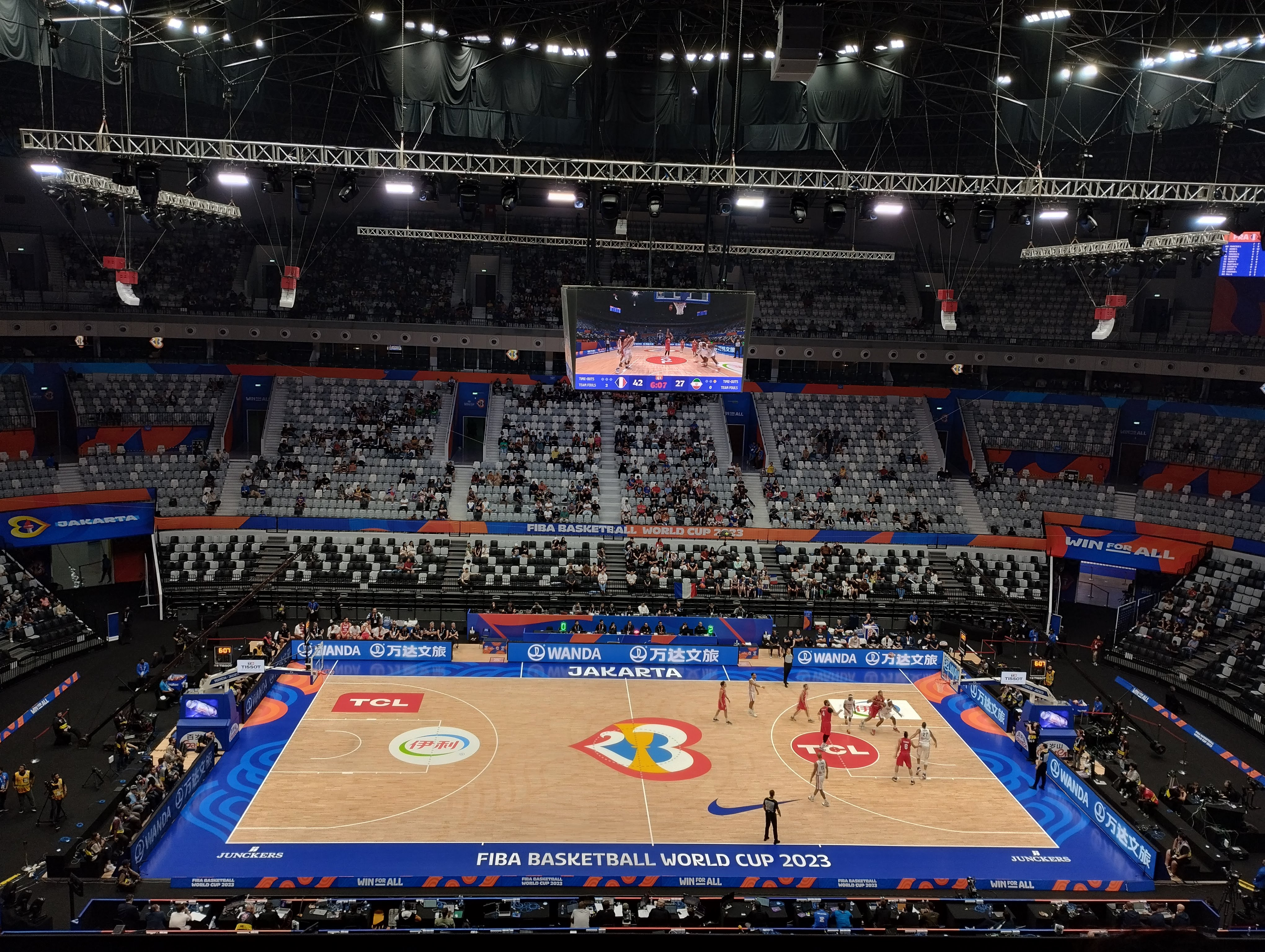
France vs Iran match on August 31rd, 2023

Group P was one of four groups of the classification round of the 2023 FIBA Basketball World Cup. It took place from 31 August to 2 September 2023 and consisted of the bottom-two teams from Groups G and H. The results from the preliminary round was carried over. The teams played against the teams from the other group, with all games played at the Indonesia Arena, Jakarta, Indonesia. The first placed team was classified 17 to 20, the second placed team 21 to 24, the third placed team 25 to 28 and the fourth placed team 29 to 32.

== Qualified teams ==
Group	Third place	Fourth place
G	Ivory Coast	Iran
H	France	Lebanon

== Standings ==
Pos	Team	Pld	W	L	PF	PA	PD	Pts
1	France	5	3	2	405	394	+11	8
2	Lebanon	5	2	3	397	479	−82	7
3	Ivory Coast	5	1	4	373	433	−60	6
4	Iran	5	0	5	321	419	−98	5

Source: FIBA
Rules for classification: Tiebreakers

== Games ==
All times are local (UTC+7).

=== Ivory Coast vs. Lebanon ===
This was the first competitive game between Ivory Coast and Lebanon.

31 August 2023
16:45

Boxscore

Ivory Coast	84–94	Lebanon
Scoring by quarter: 20–32, 21–23, 25–18, 18–21
Pts: Dally 21; Rebs: Tape 6 Asts: Diabate 9		Pts: Saoud 29; Rebs: Spellman 6 Asts: Saoud 8

Indonesia Arena, Jakarta
Attendance: 5,033
Referees: Juan Fernández (ARG), Jenna Reneau (USA), Gvidas Gedvilas (LTU)

=== France vs. Iran ===
This was the second game between France and Iran in the World Cup. The French won the first meeting in 2014. The French also won in the group stage of the 2020 Olympic tournament, which was the last competitive game between the two teams.

31 August 2023
20:30

Boxscore

France	82–55	Iran
Scoring by quarter: 9–12, 26–15, 19–9, 28–19
Pts: Okobo 13; Rebs: Gobert 9 Asts: De Colo 7		Pts: Mirzaei, Yakhchali 11; Rebs: three players 6 Asts: Yakhchali 4

Indonesia Arena, Jakarta
Attendance: 4,494
Referees: Aleksandar Glišić (SRB), Andrés Bartel (URU), Yevgeniy Mikheyev (KAZ)

=== Ivory Coast vs. France ===
This was the first competitive game between Ivory Coast and France.

2 September 2023
16:45

Boxscore

Ivory Coast	77–87	France
Scoring by quarter: 21–25, 20–15, 20–22, 16–25
Pts: Zouzoua 18; Rebs: V. Fofana 7 Asts: Diabate 11		Pts: Cordinier 19; Rebs: Gobert 8 Asts: Francisco 7

Indonesia Arena, Jakarta
Attendance: 9,404
Referees: Andrés Bartel (URU), Scott Beker (AUS), Daigo Urushima (JPN)

=== Iran vs. Lebanon ===
This was the first game between Iran and Lebanon at the World Cup. The Iranians won in the quarter-finals of the 2017 FIBA Asia Cup, which was the last competitive game between the two teams.

2 September 2023
20:30

Boxscore

Iran	73–81	Lebanon
Scoring by quarter: 13–20, 23–28, 13–14, 24–19
Pts: Amini 22; Rebs: Kazemi 11; Asts: three players 4		Pts: Arakji 21; Rebs: Spellman 11; Asts: Arakji 7

Indonesia Arena, Jakarta
Attendance: 5,869
Referees: Johnny Batista (PUR), Yevgeniy Mikheyev (KAZ), Roberto Vázquez (PUR)
