= 2023 FIBA Basketball World Cup Group N =

Group N was one of four groups of the classification round of the 2023 FIBA Basketball World Cup. It took place from 31 August to 2 September 2023 and consisted of the bottom-two teams from Groups C and D. The results from the preliminary round were carried over. The teams played against the teams from the other group, with all games played at the Mall of Asia Arena, Pasay, Philippines. The first placed team was classified 17 to 20, the second placed team 21 to 24, the third placed team 25 to 28 and the fourth placed team 29 to 32.

== Qualified teams ==
Group	Third place	Fourth place
C	New Zealand	Jordan
D	Egypt	Mexico

== Standings ==
Pos	Team	Pld	W	L	PF	PA	PD	Pts
1	Egypt	5	2	3	412	411	+1	7 (Note: Egypt 3 Pts, +26 PD; New Zealand 3 Pts, −6 PD; Mexico 3 Pts, −20 PD)
2	New Zealand	5	2	3	429	463	−34	7
3	Mexico	5	2	3	410	467	−57	7
4	Jordan	5	0	5	369	475	−106	5

Source: FIBA
Rules for classification: Tiebreakers

== Games ==
All times are local (UTC+8).

=== New Zealand vs. Mexico ===
This was the first competitive game between New Zealand and Mexico.

31 August 2023
16:45

Boxscore

New Zealand	100–108	Mexico
Scoring by quarter: 22–31, 19–26, 27–21, 32–30
Pts: Te Rangi 32; Rebs: Harris 8 Asts: Ili 10		Pts: Cruz 27; Rebs: Jaimes 11; Asts: Stoll 9

Mall of Asia Arena, Pasay
Attendance: 2,919
Referees: Takaki Kato (JPN), Daniel García (VEN), Péter Praksch (HUN)

=== Egypt vs. Jordan ===
This was the first competitive game between Egypt and Jordan.

31 August 2023
20:30

Boxscore

Egypt	85–69	Jordan
Scoring by quarter: 22–14, 18–22, 19–20, 26–13
Pts: Amin, Marei 20; Rebs: Marei 14; Asts: Gendy 5		Pts: Bzai 18; Rebs: Al-Dwairi 11; Asts: Ibrahim 5

Mall of Asia Arena, Pasay
Attendance: 3,532
Referees: Antonio Conde (ESP), Boris Krejič (SLO), Manuel Attard (ITA)

=== New Zealand vs. Egypt ===
This was the first competitive game between New Zealand and Egypt.

2 September 2023
16:45

Boxscore

New Zealand	88–86	Egypt
Scoring by quarter: 22–25, 25–10, 21–26, 20–25
Pts: Delany, Le'afa 27; Rebs: Wetzell 7 Asts: Ili 5		Pts: Amin, Gendy 19; Rebs: Mahmoud 9 Asts: Amin 9

Mall of Asia Arena, Pasay
Attendance: 3,738
Referees: Daniel García (VEN), Péter Praksch (HUN), Park Kyoung-jin (KOR)

=== Jordan vs. Mexico ===
This was the first competitive game between Jordan and Mexico.

2 September 2023
20:30

Boxscore

Jordan	80–93	Mexico
Scoring by quarter: 24–24, 19–19, 22–25, 15–25
Pts: Hollis-Jefferson 26; Rebs: Al-Dwairi 9 Asts: Hollis-Jefferson 10		Pts: Girón 21; Rebs: Jaimes 11; Asts: Jaimes 6

Mall of Asia Arena, Pasay
Attendance: 4,956
Referees: Boris Krejič (SLO), Carlos Vélez (COL), Kristian Paez (ECU)
