= 2023 FIBA Basketball World Cup Group O =

Group O was one of four groups of the classification round of the 2023 FIBA Basketball World Cup. It took place from 31 August to 2 September 2023 and consisted of the bottom-two teams from Groups E and F. The results from the preliminary round were carried over. The teams played against the teams from the other group, with all games played at the Okinawa Arena, Okinawa City, Japan. The first placed team was classified 17 to 20, the second placed team 21 to 24, the third placed team 25 to 28 and the fourth placed team 29 to 32.

== Qualified teams ==
Group	Third place	Fourth place
E	Japan	Finland
F	Cape Verde	Venezuela

== Standings ==
Pos	Team	Pld	W	L	PF	PA	PD	Pts
1	Japan (H)	5	3	2	416	426	−10	8
2	Finland	5	2	3	425	449	−24	7
3	Cape Verde	5	1	4	366	432	−66	6
4	Venezuela	5	0	5	371	427	−56	5

Source: FIBA
Rules for classification: Tiebreakers
(H) Hosts

== Games ==
All times are local (UTC+9).

=== Cape Verde vs. Finland ===
This was the first competitive game between Cape Verde and Finland.

31 August 2023
16:30

Boxscore

Cape Verde	77–100	Finland
Scoring by quarter: 16–28, 23–26, 17–23, 21–23
Pts: I. Almeida 17; Rebs: E. Tavares 12; Asts: Mendes 5		Pts: Markkanen 34; Rebs: Markkanen 9 Asts: Jantunen, Salin 6

Okinawa Arena, Okinawa City
Attendance: 5,960
Referees: Jorge Vázquez (PUR), Wojciech Liszka (POL), Ahmed Al-Shuwaili (IRQ)

=== Japan vs. Venezuela ===
This was the first competitive game between Japan and Venezuela.

31 August 2023
20:10

Boxscore

Japan	86–77	Venezuela
Scoring by quarter: 15–19, 21–22, 17–21, 33–15
Pts: Hiejima 23; Rebs: Hawkinson 11; Asts: Kawamura 11		Pts: Sojo 20; Rebs: Ruiz 9 Asts: Guillent 10

Okinawa Arena, Okinawa City
Attendance: 7,374
Referees: Ademir Zurapović (BIH), Blanca Burns (USA), Wael Mostafa (EGY)

=== Finland vs. Venezuela ===
This was the first competitive game between Finland and Venezuela.

2 September 2023
16:30

Boxscore

Finland	90–75	Venezuela
Scoring by quarter: 13–17, 35–18, 19–27, 23–13
Pts: Markkanen 32; Rebs: Markkanen 9 Asts: Little 9		Pts: Chourio 17; Rebs: Graterol 6 Asts: Guillent 7

Okinawa Arena, Okinawa City
Attendance: 6,216
Referees: Martin Horozov (BUL), Wojciech Liszka (POL), Ahmed Al-Shuwaili (IRQ)

=== Japan vs. Cape Verde ===
This was the first competitive game between Japan and Cape Verde.

2 September 2023
20:10

Boxscore

Japan	80–71	Cape Verde
Scoring by quarter: 17–19, 33–18, 23–18, 7–16
Pts: Hawkinson 29; Rebs: Watanabe 10; Asts: Kawamura 8		Pts: Da Rosa, E. Tavares 11; Rebs: E. Tavares 14; Asts: I. Almeida 6

Okinawa Arena, Okinawa City
Attendance: 7,374
Referees: Omar Bermúdez (MEX), Amy Bonner (USA), Waseem Husainy (CAN)
