= 2023 FIBA Basketball World Cup Group M =

Group M was one of four groups of the classification round of the 2023 FIBA Basketball World Cup. It took place from 31 August to 2 September 2023 and consisted of the bottom-two teams from Groups A and B. The results from the preliminary round were carried over. The teams played against the teams from the other group, with all games played at the Araneta Coliseum, Quezon City, Philippines. The first placed team was classified 17 to 20, the second placed team 21 to 24, the third placed team 25 to 28 and the fourth placed team 29 to 32.

== Qualified teams ==
Group	Third place	Fourth place
A	Angola	Philippines
B	South Sudan	China

== Standings ==
Pos	Team	Pld	W	L	PF	PA	PD	Pts
1	South Sudan	5	3	2	456	431	+25	8
2	Philippines (H)	5	1	4	398	419	−21	6 (Note: Philippines 3 Pts, +11 PD; Angola 3 Pts, +3 PD; China 3 Pts, −14 PD)
3	Angola	5	1	4	368	410	−42	6
4	China	5	1	4	379	473	−94	6

Source: FIBA
Rules for classification: Tiebreakers
(H) Hosts

== Games ==
All times are local (UTC+8).

=== Angola vs. China ===
This was the third game between Angola and China in the World Cup. The Angolans won the first two meetings in 1990 and 2002. The Chinese won in the group stage of the 2008 Olympic tournament, which was the last competitive game between the two teams.

31 August 2023
16:00

Boxscore

Angola	76–83	China
Scoring by quarter: 27–24, 18–21, 14–24, 17–14
Pts: Dundão 17; Rebs: De Sousa 9 Asts: Dundão 8		Pts: Hu 20; Rebs: Li 7 Asts: Zhao R. 6

Araneta Coliseum, Quezon City
Attendance: 3,179
Referees: Yohan Rosso (FRA), Mārtiņš Kozlovskis (LAT), Martin Vulić (CRO)

=== South Sudan vs. Philippines ===
This was the first competitive game between South Sudan and the Philippines.

31 August 2023
20:00

Boxscore

South Sudan	87–68	Philippines
Scoring by quarter: 34–17, 17–16, 9–17, 27–18
Pts: Jones 17; Rebs: Gabriel 11; Asts: Jones 14		Pts: Clarkson 24; Rebs: Edu 14; Asts: Ravena 5

Araneta Coliseum, Quezon City
Attendance: 9,250
Referees: Guilherme Locatelli (BRA), Gatis Saliņš (LAT), Georgios Poursanidis (GRE)

=== Angola vs. South Sudan ===
This was the first competitive game between Angola and South Sudan.

2 September 2023
16:00

Boxscore

Angola	78–101	South Sudan
Scoring by quarter: 16–30, 23–23, 18–20, 21–28
Pts: Dundão 21; Rebs: Bango 13; Asts: Domingos 8		Pts: Jones 26; Rebs: Gabriel 10; Asts: Jones 15

Araneta Coliseum, Quezon City
Attendance: 4,136
Referees: Gatis Saliņš (LAT), Luis Castillo (ESP), Carlos Peralta (ECU)

=== Philippines vs. China ===
The Philippines and China last played against each other in the 2018 Asian Games with the latter team winning. This was also the Philippines' first win in the FIBA World Cup since 2014 and first ever win as host; Philippines finished winless in 1978 as host.

2 September 2023
20:00

Boxscore

Philippines	96–75	China
Scoring by quarter: 16–16, 23–24, 34–11, 23–24
Pts: Clarkson 34; Rebs: Edu 10; Asts: Ramos, Thompson 4		Pts: Li 17; Rebs: Li 9 Asts: Li 5

Araneta Coliseum, Quezon City
Attendance: 11,080
Referees: Mārtiņš Kozlovskis (LAT), Kerem Baki (TUR), Martin Vulić (CRO)
