= 2023 FIBA Basketball World Cup Group J =

Group J was one of four groups of the second round of the 2023 FIBA Basketball World Cup. It took place from 1 to 3 September 2023 and consisted of the top-two teams from Groups C and D. The results from the preliminary round were carried over. The teams played against the teams from the other group, with all games played at the Mall of Asia Arena, Pasay, Philippines. The top two teams advanced to the quarterfinals, the third placed team was classified 9 to 12 and the fourth placed team 13 to 16.

== Qualified teams ==
Group	Winner	Runner-up
C	United States	Greece
D	Lithuania	Montenegro

== Standings ==
Pos	Team	Pld	W	L	PF	PA	PD	Pts	Qualification
1	Lithuania	5	5	0	482	375	+107	10	Quarter-finals
2	United States	5	4	1	507	398	+109	9	Quarter-finals
3	Montenegro	5	3	2	397	390	+7	8	
4	Greece	5	2	3	392	419	−27	7	

Source: FIBA
Rules for classification: Tiebreakers

== Games ==
All times are local (UTC+8).

=== United States vs. Montenegro ===
This was the first competitive game between the United States and Montenegro.

1 September 2023
16:40

Boxscore

United States	85–73	Montenegro
Scoring by quarter: 19–18, 18–20, 24–17, 24–18
Pts: Edwards 17; Rebs: Ingram 5 Asts: Haliburton 6		Pts: Vučević 18; Rebs: Vučević 16; Asts: Perry 6

Mall of Asia Arena, Pasay
Attendance: 7,699
Referees: Yohan Rosso (FRA), Boris Krejič (SLO), Gatis Saliņš (LAT)

=== Lithuania vs. Greece ===
This was the second game between Lithuania and Greece in the World Cup. The Greeks won the first meeting in 2006. The Greeks also won in the round of 16 of EuroBasket 2017, which was the last competitive game between the two teams.

1 September 2023
20:40

Boxscore

Lithuania	92–67	Greece
Scoring by quarter: 20–20, 19–23, 25–15, 28–9
Pts: Jokubaitis 19; Rebs: Valančiūnas 9 Asts: Jokubaitis 6		Pts: Walkup 21; Rebs: Walkup 8 Asts: Walkup 7

Mall of Asia Arena, Pasay
Attendance: 5,986
Referees: Manuel Mazzoni (ITA), Mārtiņš Kozlovskis (LAT), Kerem Baki (TUR)

=== Greece vs. Montenegro ===
This was the second game between Greece and Montenegro in the World Cup. The Greeks won the first meeting in 2019, which was also the last competitive game between the two teams.

3 September 2023
16:40

Boxscore

Greece	69–73	Montenegro
Scoring by quarter: 14–19, 16–17, 12–14, 27–23
Pts: Papapetrou 16; Rebs: Bochoridis 6 Asts: Walkup 6		Pts: Vučević 19; Rebs: Dubljević 9 Asts: Dubljević 9

Mall of Asia Arena, Pasay
Attendance: 6,193
Referees: Daniel García (VEN), Kristian Paez (ECU), Péter Praksch (HUN)

=== United States vs. Lithuania ===
This was the fourth game between the United States and Lithuania in the World Cup. The Lithuanians won the first meeting in 1998 while the Americans won the last two games in 2010 and 2014. Also Lithuanian win replay of the 2004 Olympic Games.

3 September 2023
20:40

Boxscore

United States	104–110	Lithuania
Scoring by quarter: 12–31, 25–23, 28–17, 39–39
Pts: Edwards 35; Rebs: Portis 5 Asts: Brunson, Haliburton 7		Pts: Kariniauskas 15; Rebs: Sedekerskis 11; Asts: Jokubaitis 6

Mall of Asia Arena, Pasay
Attendance: 11,349
Referees: Antonio Conde (ESP), Takaki Kato (JPN), Boris Krejič (SLO)
