= 2023 FIBA Basketball World Cup Group I =

Group I was one of four groups of the second round of the 2023 FIBA Basketball World Cup. It took place from 1 to 3 September 2023 and consisted of the top-two teams from Groups A and B. The results from the preliminary round were carried over. The teams were playing against the teams from the other group, with all games played at the Araneta Coliseum, Quezon City, Philippines. The top two teams advanced to the quarterfinals, the third placed team was classified 9 to 12 and the fourth placed team 13 to 16.

== Qualified teams ==
Group	Winner	Runner-up
A	Dominican Republic	Italy
B	Serbia	Puerto Rico

== Standings ==
Pos	Team	Pld	W	L	PF	PA	PD	Pts	Qualification
1	Italy	5	4	1	404	370	+34	9 (Note: Italy 1–0 Serbia)	Quarter-finals
2	Serbia	5	4	1	502	380	+122	9	Quarter-finals
3	Puerto Rico	5	3	2	444	449	−5	8 (Note: Puerto Rico 1–0 Dominican Republic)	
4	Dominican Republic	5	3	2	425	444	−19	8	

Source: FIBA
Rules for classification: Tiebreakers

== Games ==
All times are local (UTC+8).

=== Serbia vs. Italy ===
This will be the second game between Italy and Serbia, as an independent country, in the World Cup. Serbia won the first meeting in 2019. Italy, meanwhile, won their last competitive game at the 2022 FIBA EuroBasket.

1 September 2023
16:00

Boxscore

Serbia	76–78	Italy
Scoring by quarter: 19–23, 23–17, 20–19, 14–19
Pts: Bogdanović 18; Rebs: Milutinov 12; Asts: Bogdanović 4		Pts: Fontecchio 30; Rebs: Fontecchio 7 Asts: Pajola 6

Araneta Coliseum, Quezon City
Attendance: 3,117
Referees: Antonio Conde (ESP), Luis Castillo (ESP), Martin Vulić (CRO)

=== Dominican Republic vs. Puerto Rico ===
This will be the second game between the Dominican Republic and Puerto Rico in the World Cup. Puerto Rico won the first meeting in 1978. Dominican Republic, meanwhile, won their last competitive game at the 2023 Central American and Caribbean Games.

1 September 2023
20:00

Boxscore

Dominican Republic	97–102	Puerto Rico
Scoring by quarter: 12–17, 33–28, 29–24, 23–33
Pts: Towns 39; Rebs: Towns 10; Asts: Feliz 8		Pts: Waters 37; Rebs: three players 7 Asts: Waters 11

Araneta Coliseum, Quezon City
Attendance: 3,465
Referees: Guilherme Locatelli (BRA), Rabah Noujaim (LBN), Carlos Peralta (ECU)

=== Italy vs. Puerto Rico ===
This will be the seventh game between Italy and Puerto Rico in the World Cup. Italy has won all but one of the seven meetings, including their last World Cup matchup (1967, 1978, 1986, 1998, 2006, and 2019); Puerto Rico, meanwhile, won their first meeting in 1963. Italy also won their last competitive game at the 2020 Olympic Qualifying Tournaments.

3 September 2023
16:00

Boxscore

Italy	73–57	Puerto Rico
Scoring by quarter: 25–15, 14–21, 12–11, 22–10
Pts: Ricci, Tonut 15; Rebs: Fontecchio, Melli 12; Asts: Pajola 9		Pts: Waters 13; Rebs: Piñeiro 7 Asts: Waters 9

Araneta Coliseum, Quezon City
Attendance: 4,379
Referees: Guilherme Locatelli (BRA), Mārtiņš Kozlovskis (LAT), Martin Vulić (CRO)

=== Dominican Republic vs. Serbia ===
This will be the first competitive matchup between the Dominican Republic and Serbia.

3 September 2023
20:00

Boxscore

Dominican Republic	79–112	Serbia
Scoring by quarter: 15–29, 20–27, 18–31, 26–25
Pts: Towns 25; Rebs: Towns 7 Asts: Montero 4		Pts: Bogdanović 20; Rebs: S. Jović 6 Asts: S. Jović 7

Araneta Coliseum, Quezon City
Attendance: 6,616
Referees: Yohan Rosso (FRA), Luis Castillo (ESP), Gatis Saliņš (LAT)
