= 2023 FIBA Basketball World Cup Group G =

International basketball results

Group G was one of eight groups of the preliminary round of the 2023 FIBA Basketball World Cup. It took place from 26 to 30 August 2023, and consisted of Brazil, Iran, Ivory Coast, and Spain. Each team played each other once, for a total of three games per team, with all games played at the Indonesia Arena, Jakarta, Indonesia. The top two teams advanced to the second round and the bottom two teams qualified for the classification rounds.

== Teams ==
Team	Qualification		Appearance			Best performance	WR
Team	As	Date	Last	Total	Streak	Best performance	WR
Iran	Asian Group F top three	26 February 2023	2019	4	4	19th place (2010)	20
Spain	European Group L top three	14 November 2022	2019	13	11	Champions (2006, 2019)	1
Ivory Coast	African Group E top two	28 August 2022	2019	5	2	13th place (1982)	43
Brazil	American best fourth placed team	26 February 2023	2019	19	19	Champions (1959, 1963)	13

== Standings ==
Pos	Team	Pld	W	L	PF	PA	PD	Pts	Qualification
1	Spain	3	3	0	275	207	+68	6	Second round
2	Brazil	3	2	1	267	232	+35	5	Second round
3	Ivory Coast	3	1	2	212	252	−40	4	17th–32nd classification
4	Iran	3	0	3	193	256	−63	3	17th–32nd classification

Source: FIBA
Rules for classification: Tiebreakers

== Games ==
All times are local (UTC+7).

=== Iran vs. Brazil ===
This was the third meeting between Brazil and Iran in the World Cup. The Brazilians won the first two meetings in 2010 and 2014.

26 August 2023
16:45

Boxscore

Iran	59–100	Brazil
Scoring by quarter: 12–33, 13–24, 21–25, 13–18
Pts: Aghajanpour 11; Rebs: Amini 6 Asts: four players 3		Pts: Caboclo 16; Rebs: Caboclo 7 Asts: Huertas, Yago 6

Indonesia Arena, Jakarta
Attendance: 6,251
Referees: Julio Anaya (PAN), Aleksandar Glišić (SRB), Daigo Urushima (JPN)

=== Spain vs. Ivory Coast ===
This was the first competitive game between Spain and the Ivory Coast.

26 August 2023
20:30

Boxscore

Spain	94–64	Ivory Coast
Scoring by quarter: 24–17, 29–17, 20–13, 21–17
Pts: W. Hernangómez 22; Rebs: Garuba 7 Asts: Núñez 8		Pts: Koné 11; Rebs: V. Fofana 5 Asts: Koné 3

Indonesia Arena, Jakarta
Attendance: 8,144
Referees: Juan Fernández (ARG), Andrés Bartel (URU), Yevgeniy Mikheyev (KAZ)

=== Ivory Coast vs. Iran ===
This was the first competitive game between the Ivory Coast and Iran.

28 August 2023
16:45

Boxscore

Ivory Coast	71–69	Iran
Scoring by quarter: 15–20, 22–15, 17–21, 17–13
Pts: Zouzoua 17; Rebs: Bah, Sidibé 5 Asts: three players 3		Pts: Yakhchali 19; Rebs: Haddadi, Kazemi 8 Asts: Amini 4

Indonesia Arena, Jakarta
Attendance: 4,558
Referees: Aleksandar Glišić (SRB), Scott Beker (AUS), Gvidas Gedvilas (LTU)

=== Brazil vs. Spain ===
This was the ninth game between Brazil and Spain. The Spaniards have won seven games, including their last head-to-head World Cup game in 2014, with Brazil's only tournament win coming from their meeting in 1986. The Brazilians won their last two Olympic matchups against Spain in 2012 and 2016, respectively.

28 August 2023
20:30

Boxscore

Brazil	78–96	Spain
Scoring by quarter: 22–21, 20–29, 17–14, 19–32
Pts: Caboclo 15; Rebs: Caboclo 11; Asts: Georginho 7		Pts: Aldama 15; Rebs: Núñez 7 Asts: Núñez 5

Indonesia Arena, Jakarta
Attendance: 7,354
Referees: Roberto Vázquez (PUR), Julio Anaya (PAN), Johnny Batista (PUR)

=== Ivory Coast vs. Brazil ===
This was the first competitive game between the Ivory Coast and Brazil.

30 August 2023
16:45

Boxscore

Ivory Coast	77–89	Brazil
Scoring by quarter: 25–23, 21–27, 19–20, 12–19
Pts: Bah 13; Rebs: Bah 13; Asts: Diabate, Koné 3		Pts: Yago 24; Rebs: Caboclo 8 Asts: Yago 12

Indonesia Arena, Jakarta
Attendance: 6,190
Referees: Roberto Vázquez (PUR), Scott Beker (AUS), Andrés Bartel (URU)

=== Iran vs. Spain ===
This was the third meeting in the World Cup between Spain and Iran. The Spaniards won the first two matchups, in 2014 and 2019.

30 August 2023
20:30

Boxscore

Iran	65–85	Spain
Scoring by quarter: 17–16, 17–27, 18–21, 13–21
Pts: Amini 19; Rebs: Girgoorian, Haddadi 5 Asts: Haddadi, Yakhchali 7		Pts: J. Hernangómez 21; Rebs: W. Hernangómez 9 Asts: Núñez 6

Indonesia Arena, Jakarta
Attendance: 7,320
Referees: Julio Anaya (PAN), Juan Fernández (ARG), Johnny Batista (PUR)
