= 2023 FIBA Basketball World Cup =

International basketball competition

FIBAバスケットボールワールドカップ2023 FIBA Basukettobōru Wārudo Kappu 2023; Piala Dunia Bola Basket FIBA 2023
- Win For All

Tournament details
- Host countries: Japan; Indonesia; Philippines
- Dates: 25 August – 10 September
- Officially opened by: See below
- Teams: 32 (from 5 confederations)
- Venue: 5 (Note: For marketing purposes, there are three host cities – Manila, Okinawa, and Jakarta. However, only two of the three venues in the Philippines are within Metro Manila; the Philippine Arena is in the province of Bulacan, 6 kilometers north of Manila's northern boundary.) (in 5 host cities)

Final positions
- Champions: Germany (1st title)
- Runners-up: Serbia
- Third place: Canada
- Fourth place: United States

Tournament statistics
- Games played: 92
- Attendance: 700,665 (7,616 per game)
- MVP: (Germany) Dennis Schröder
- Top scorer: (Slovenia) Luka Dončić (27.0 ppg)

The 2023 FIBA Basketball World Cup was the 19th tournament of the FIBA Basketball World Cup for men's national basketball teams, held from 25 August to 10 September 2023. The tournament was the second to feature 32 teams and was hosted by multiple nations for the first time in its history—the Philippines, Japan, and Indonesia.

It was the first World Cup to be hosted in Indonesia, and the second to be hosted in both the Philippines and Japan, both having first hosted the tournament in 1978 and 2006, respectively. The tournament was also the second of three-straight World Cups to be held in Asia after China's hosting of the 2019 edition and Qatar's upcoming hosting of the 2027 tournament, and the first time in tournament history that a host nation (Indonesia) had not qualified. It also served as qualification for the 2024 Summer Olympics, in which the top two teams from each of the Americas and Europe, and the top team from each of Africa, Asia and Oceania, qualified alongside the tournament's host France.

Germany went undefeated at the tournament to win their first title by defeating Serbia 83–77 in the final. It was the first appearance at the World Cup final for Germany, while for Serbia it would be its second in three tournaments, having appeared in the 2014 final. Canada went on to win the bronze medal, its first medal in World Cup history, after defeating the United States 127–118.

The tournament also set a record for the most-attended World Cup game in history, with 38,115 spectators attending the Dominican Republic vs. Philippines game at the Philippine Arena in Bocaue, breaking the previous one of 32,616 set during the 1994 final at the SkyDome in Toronto. Latvia, Georgia, Cape Verde and South Sudan all made their first World Cup appearances, with Latvia placing in the top five. Co-hosts Japan qualified for the Olympics by virtue of being the best-performing Asian team, while co-hosts Philippines qualified for the 2024 FIBA Olympic Qualifying Tournament. Both co-hosts registered wins in the tournament.

The defending champions, Spain, lost to Latvia and Canada in the second round and finished only in ninth place. This was the first time Spain missed the quarter-finals since 1994. Olympic champions United States also failed to win a medal for the second consecutive tournament.

== Host selection ==
On 7 June 2016, FIBA approved the bidding process for the 2023 FIBA Basketball World Cup.

Joint bids by member federations were also approved by the FIBA Central Board starting from the 2023 edition, and there is no restriction for a country from the confederation that hosted the previous edition to bid for the World Cup hosting rights.

On 1 June 2017, FIBA confirmed the list of candidates for the hosting of the World Cup.

- Argentina / Uruguay
- Philippines / Japan / Indonesia
- Russia (withdrawn)
- Turkey (withdrawn)

Solo bidders Russia and Turkey ended their bids, leaving joint bids of the Philippines–Japan–Indonesia, and Argentina–Uruguay left in the race, automatically marking the 2023 tournament as the first to be hosted by multiple nations.

=== Voting results ===
On 9 December 2017, it was announced that the Philippines, Japan, and Indonesia won the bid and will host the upcoming World Cup, after Argentina and Uruguay withdrew their joint-bid on the same day, leaving FIBA to award the hosting rights via a unanimous vote.

2023 FIBA Basketball World Cup bidding results
Nations	Votes
Philippines / Japan / Indonesia	Unanimous
Argentina / Uruguay	Withdrew

== Teams ==
=== Qualification ===
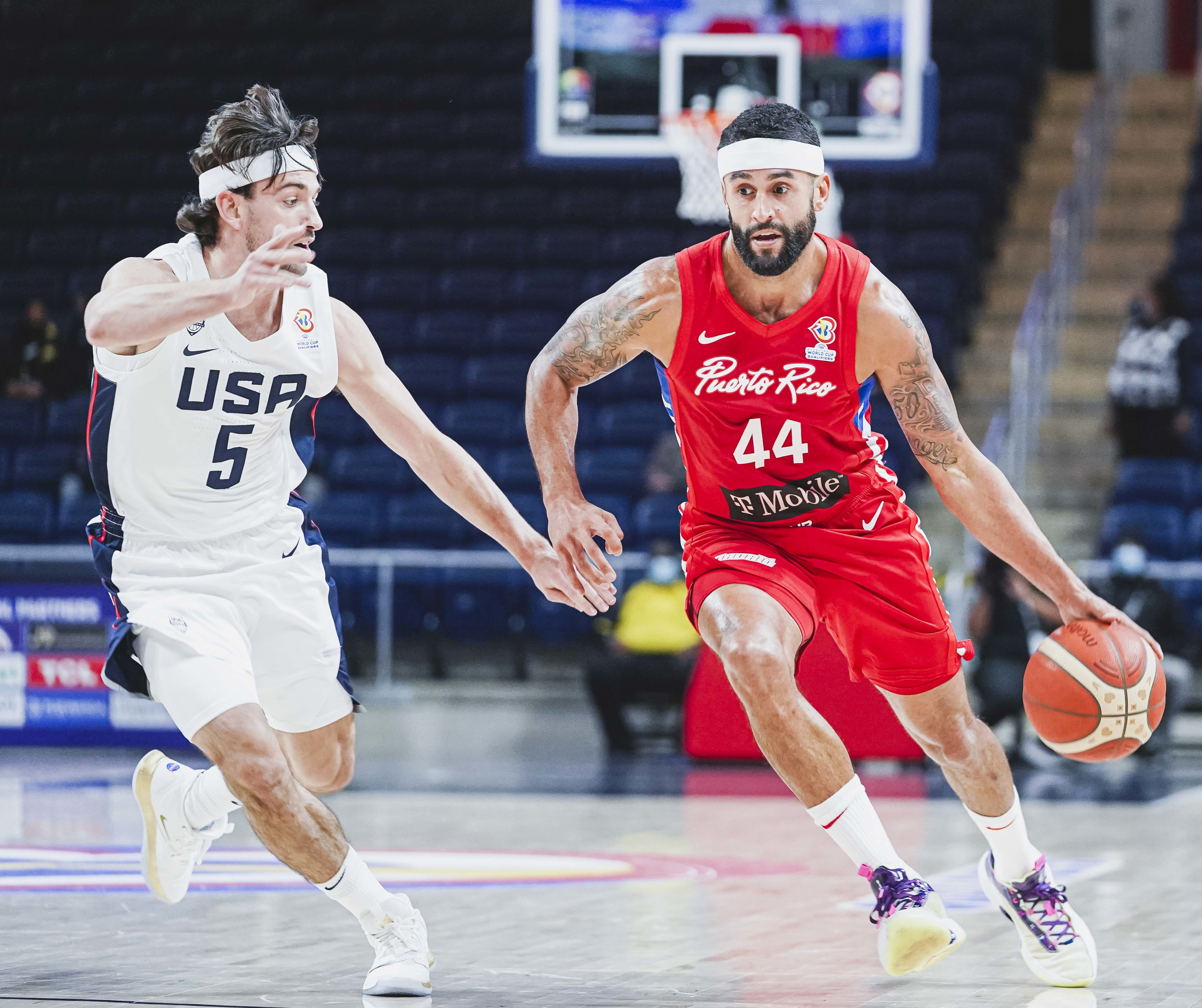
David Stockton (left) and Javier Mojica during a February 2022 qualifying game at Entertainment and Sports Arena

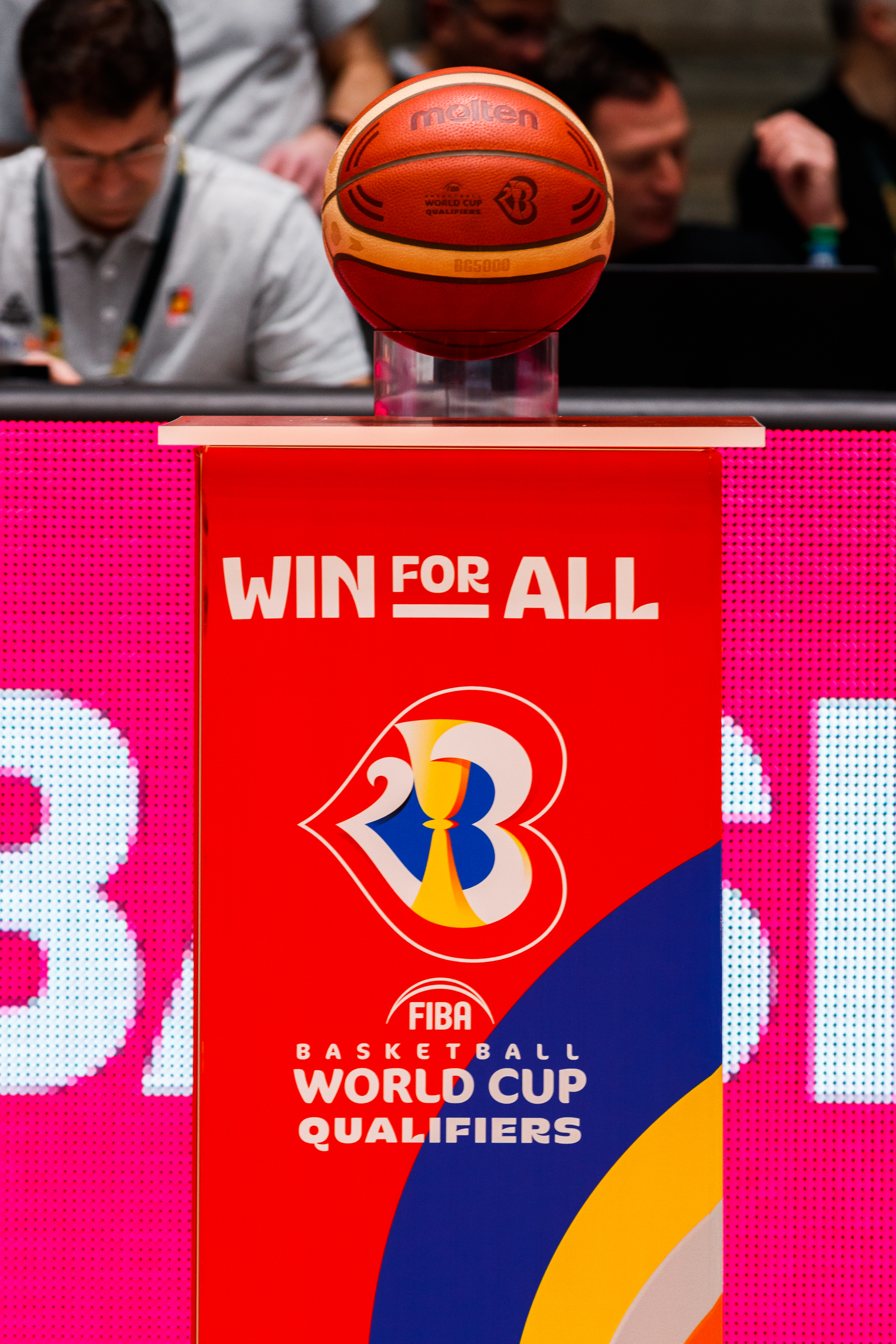
The official Molten basketball in 2023 World Cup Qualifiers

As co-hosts, the Philippines and Japan each got an automatic qualification for the tournament when they were awarded joint hosting rights along with co-host Indonesia. However, Indonesia's host qualification slot was conditional, as FIBA wanted the Indonesian national team to be competitive by 2021 and thus required Indonesia to qualify for and finish in the top-eight (advance to the quarter-finals) of the 2022 FIBA Asia Cup (postponed from 2021). Indonesia officially qualified for the Asia Cup as host and advanced from the preliminary round-robin round, but lost to China in the playoff round (round of 16) and were therefore unable to secure qualification for their hoped-for FIBA Basketball World Cup debut. This was the first time in the FIBA Basketball World Cup history that a host nation did not qualify.

80 teams from four FIBA zones qualified for the World Cup qualifiers through qualification for the FIBA Continental Cups (AfroBasket 2021, 2022 FIBA AmeriCup, 2022 FIBA Asia Cup, and EuroBasket 2022). For Europe and the Americas, additional teams qualified through the pre-qualifiers of the said regions. The participants of both the AfroBasket and the Asia Cup comprised the teams that also took part in the qualifiers for their respective regions. The first game of the qualifiers took place in Minsk on 25 November 2021 between Belarus and Turkey, as part of the European Qualifiers. The draw for the World Cup qualifiers was held at the Patrick Baumann House of Basketball in Mies, Switzerland, on 31 August 2021.

The first round of the Americas, Asia/Oceania, and Africa qualifiers featured 16 teams each, whereas Europe had 32 teams. Division A teams were split into groups of four, to be held in a home-and-away round-robin. The top three teams in each group advanced to the second round. In round two of the World Cup qualifiers, teams were split into six groups, totaling four groups in Europe and two in the other qualifiers. Teams carried over the points from round one, and faced the other three teams again in a home-and-away round-robin. The best teams in each group qualified for the World Cup. No wild card selection was held, and the Olympic champions (United States) were not guaranteed a spot in the tournament.

The complete field of 32 teams that participated in the FIBA Basketball World Cup 2023 was determined on 27 February 2023 at the conclusion of the sixth window of qualifiers.

=== Qualified teams ===
Teams qualified Teams failed to qualify Teams withdrew Teams did not enter

On 28 August 2022, Finland and the Ivory Coast became the first teams to qualify from Europe and Africa, respectively. The following day, New Zealand became the first Asian team outside of hosts Japan and the Philippines to qualify for the tournament. Finland made their second World Cup appearance after their debut at the 2014 edition in Spain. On 10 November 2022, Canada became the first team from the Americas to qualify.

Alongside Finland, Slovenia, Egypt, and Mexico returned to the World Cup since the 2014 edition after notably missing the 2019 tournament in China.

Lebanon returned to the World Cup after participating in the 2010 edition, while Latvia, South Sudan, and Georgia all made their FIBA Basketball World Cup debut. Cape Verde also qualified for their first World Cup, becoming the smallest nation in tournament history to qualify.

Brazil and the United States also secured qualification for the tournament, continuing their streaks of participating in all World Cups since its inception in 1950.

Days before the second window of the Asian Qualifiers, South Korea withdrew from the tournament due to one of its players, scheduled to join the team in its second window campaign, testing positive for COVID-19. The Korea Basketball Association made an appeal to FIBA to justify its non-appearance in the qualifiers but was rejected. As a result, South Korea failed to qualify for the World Cup after qualifying for two straight tournaments (2014 and 2019). Algeria withdrew from the tournament for similar reasons. Russia, who also participated in the 2019 World Cup, were banned from FIBA tournaments, including the World Cup and its qualifiers due to the country's invasion of Ukraine in February 2022. Belarus was also banned from FIBA tournaments and the past results of the games they played in the European Qualifiers were annulled. Mali were disqualified during qualifying by forfeiting two games.

After winning the silver medal at the 2019 World Cup in China and nine consecutive appearances dating back to 1986 in Spain, reigning FIBA AmeriCup champions Argentina failed to qualify for the tournament after their defeat to the Dominican Republic in the final window of qualification. Notable countries in Africa also failed to make the World Cup, including two-time reigning AfroBasket champions Tunisia, which made the last three World Cups prior to 2023 (2010, 2014, and 2019), Senegal, which qualified for the 2014 and 2019 editions, and Nigeria, who was the lone African nation to qualify for the 2020 Summer Olympics in Tokyo.

The qualified teams, listed by region, with numbers in parentheses indicating final positions in the FIBA Men's World Ranking before the tournament were:

Africa (5)

- Angola (41)
- Cape Verde (64) (debut)
- Egypt (55)
- Ivory Coast (42)
- South Sudan (62) (debut)

Americas (7)

- Brazil (13)
- Canada (15)
- Dominican Republic (23)
- Mexico (31)
- Puerto Rico (20)
- United States (2)
- Venezuela (17)

Asia and Oceania (8)

- Australia (3)
- China (27)
- Iran (22)
- Japan (36) (co-hosts)
- Jordan (33)
- Lebanon (43)
- New Zealand (26)
- Philippines (40) (main hosts)

Europe (12)

- Finland (24)
- France (5)
- Georgia (32) (debut)
- Germany (11)
- Greece (9)
- Italy (10)
- Latvia (29) (debut)
- Lithuania (8)
- Montenegro (18)
- Serbia (6)
- Slovenia (7)
- Spain (1)

=== Draw ===
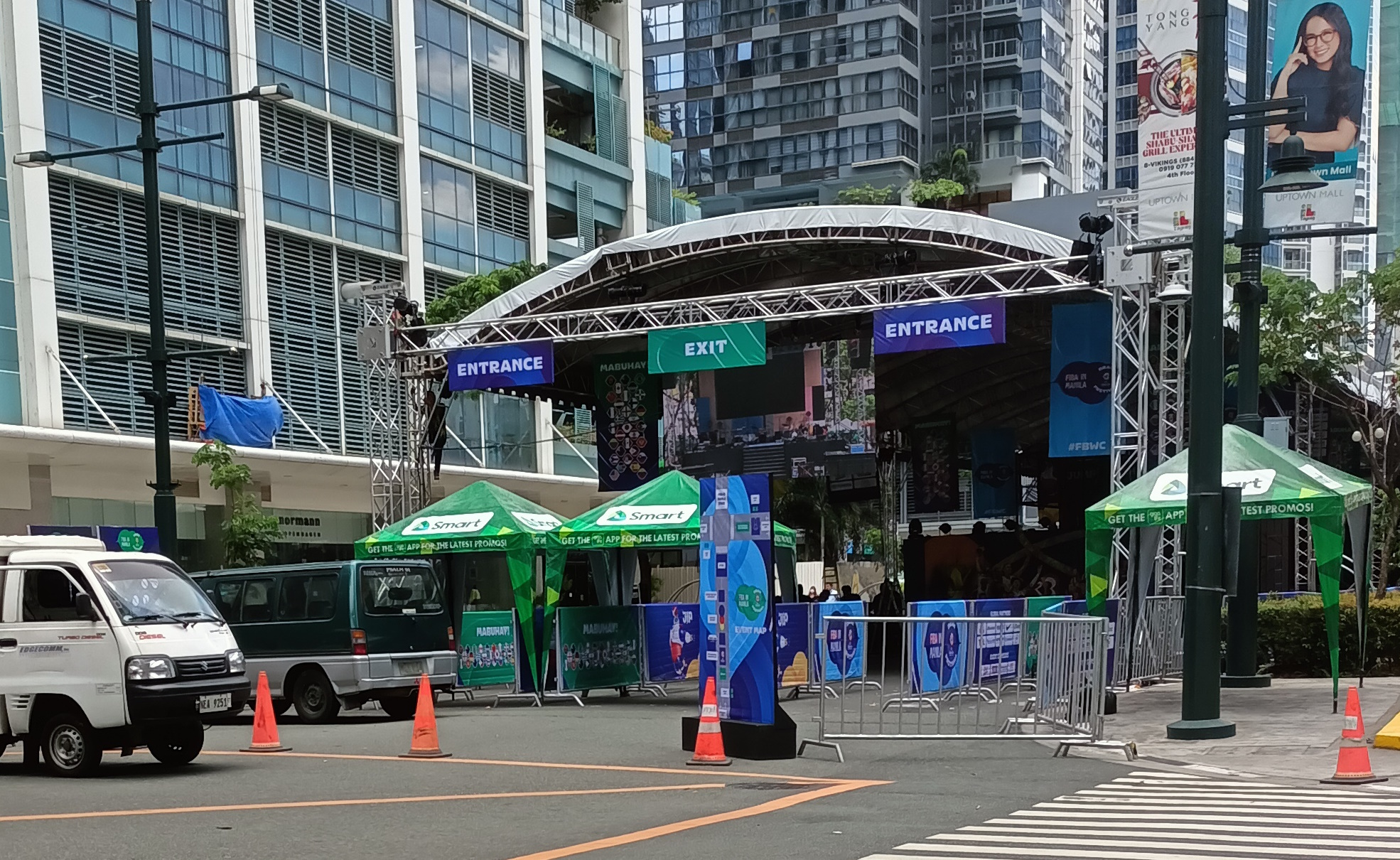
Makeshift venue for the Manila Draw Festival – 2023 FIBA Basketball World Cup along 9th Avenue, near the Uptown Mall, at the Bonifacio Global City in Taguig, Philippines. The draw was held on April 29, 2023

The draw took place on 29 April 2023 at the Araneta Coliseum in Quezon City, Philippines, at 19:30 PHT.

FIBA Basketball World Cup 2023 Global Ambassador Luis Scola (Argentina) and 2011 NBA champion Dirk Nowitzki (Germany) led the draw ceremony, along with Local Ambassadors from the three host nations: 2014 Philippine World Cup team member LA Tenorio and Miss Universe 2018 Catriona Gray (Philippines), former national team member and current president of Levanga Hokkaido Takehiko Orimo (Japan), and actor Raffi Ahmad (Indonesia). American rapper and singer Saweetie and Filipino artists Billy Crawford and Sarah Geronimo performed during the draw.

For the draw, the 32 teams were allocated into eight pots based on the February 2023 FIBA World Rankings. The Philippines were allocated to Pot 1 as the hosts of the final stage of the tournament, alongside the three best-qualified teams: Spain, the United States, and Australia. The remaining 28 teams were allocated Pots 2 to 8 based on the February 2023 FIBA World Ranking, with co-host Japan placed in Pot 7.

Furthermore, the three host countries were given the privilege to select a team each to host in the group stage. The United States were selected to play in the Philippines, Slovenia in Japan, and Canada in Indonesia. FIBA cites "commercial reasons" for the selection which it says would not affect the draw process.

The draw consisted of two clusters of pots. Teams in Pots 1, 3, 5, and 7 were drawn into Groups A, C, E, and G, while teams in Pots 2, 4, 6, and 8 were placed into Groups B, D, F, and H.

Teams from confederations of Africa, Americas, Asia and Oceania would not be allowed to be drawn against other members of their confederation in the group stage. Additionally, each group contains at least one team from Europe, but no more than two. As such, it's known that Montenegro and Mexico were drawn to the same group, so were Spain and Brazil since Greece, Germany, and Italy from Pot 3 could not be drawn with Spain.

=== Seeding ===
The seeding was confirmed on 21 April 2023.

Groups A, C, E, and G

Pot 1	Pot 3	Pot 5	Pot 7
Philippines (40) (host) (Group A); Spain (1); United States (2) (Group C); Australia (3)	Greece (9); Italy (10); Germany (11); Brazil (13)	Iran (22); Dominican Republic (23); Finland (24); New Zealand (26)	Jordan (33); Japan (36) (host) (Group E); Angola (41); Ivory Coast (42)

Groups B, D, F, and H

Pot 2	Pot 4	Pot 6	Pot 8
France (5); Serbia (6); Slovenia (7) (Group F); Lithuania (8)	Canada (15) (Group H); Venezuela (17); Montenegro (18); Puerto Rico (20)	China (27); Latvia (29); Mexico (31); Georgia (32)	Lebanon (43); Egypt (55); South Sudan (62); Cape Verde (64)

=== Squads ===
Each team has a final roster of 12 players; a team can opt to have one naturalized player as per FIBA eligibility rules from its roster.

== Venues ==
Host venues of the FIBA Basketball World Cup in the Greater Manila Area
- 7 Bocaue
- 8 Pasay
- 9 Quezon City

The tournament was hosted in five venues in five separate cities. Three cities in the Greater Manila Area hosted four preliminary round groups, two second round groups, and the final tournament phase from the quarter-finals onwards. Okinawa and Jakarta each hosted two preliminary round groups and one second round group. The Philippines hosted 16 teams, while Japan and Indonesia hosted eight teams each.

In the Philippines, three venues were used for the World Cup: The Mall of Asia Arena in Pasay, Araneta Coliseum in Quezon City, and the Philippine Arena in Bocaue, Bulacan, all of which hosted various 2019 and 2023 FIBA Basketball World Cup Asian qualifiers games of the Philippines. The Mall of Asia Arena hosted the 2013 FIBA Asia Championship, the 2016 FIBA World Olympic Qualifying Tournament in Manila, and the 5v5 basketball events of the 2019 Southeast Asian Games. The Araneta Coliseum hosted the 1978 FIBA World Championship, while the Philippine Arena has a 55,000 seating capacity and was initially poised to host the tournament's final phase and the World Cup final. The arena also hosted the 2018 FIBA 3x3 World Cup and the opening ceremony of the 2019 Southeast Asian Games.

During FIBA's Central Board meeting on 28 April 2023, FIBA announced that the Mall of Asia Arena replaced the Philippine Arena as hosts of the final phase, citing long distances, logistical and transport reasons. Ensuring the arena's usage in the tournament aligning with the initial bid, the Philippine Arena hosted the first two World Cup games of Group A.

One venue in both Japan and Indonesia each hosted World Cup matches. The Okinawa Arena in Okinawa has a 10,000 seating capacity and is the new home arena of the Ryukyu Golden Kings of the Japanese B.League. The arena also hosted exhibition games involving the Japanese men's basketball team in preparation for the 2020 Summer Olympics in Tokyo and various 2023 FIBA Basketball World Cup Asian qualifiers games of Japan. Initially, the Istora Gelora Bung Karno in Jakarta was to be the venue to be used for the tournament. However, FIBA Central Board member Erick Thohir was quoted that the venue was only approved for the 2021 FIBA Asia Cup (postponed to 2022), which was also hosted by the city, but not for the World Cup. During the draw for the 2023 FIBA Basketball World Cup qualifiers on 31 August 2021, it was revealed that a new venue located at the Gelora Bung Karno Sports Complex would be used for the tournament. Known as Indonesia Arena, it has a seating capacity of 16,500 spectators.

A contingency plan exists to move games from Okinawa City to Metro Manila in the case of weather disturbances such as a typhoon.

Jakarta	2023 FIBA Basketball World Cup (Southeast Asia)	
Indonesia Arena	2023 FIBA Basketball World Cup (Southeast Asia)	
Capacity: 16,500 (new venue)	2023 FIBA Basketball World Cup (Southeast Asia)	
Okinawa City	2023 FIBA Basketball World Cup (Southeast Asia)	
Okinawa Arena	2023 FIBA Basketball World Cup (Southeast Asia)	
Capacity: 10,000 (new venue)	2023 FIBA Basketball World Cup (Southeast Asia)	
Greater Manila Area
Bocaue	Pasay	Quezon City
Philippine Arena	Mall of Asia Arena	Araneta Coliseum
Capacity: 55,000	Capacity: 16,500 (renovated venue)	Capacity: 15,000 (renovated venue)

=== Training venues and hotels ===
In the Philippines, the designated training venues for participating teams are the Rizal Memorial Coliseum and the Ninoy Aquino Stadium in Manila, the PhilSports Arena and the Meralco Gym in Pasig. The Conrad Manila in Pasay and Edsa Shangri-La, Manila in Mandaluyong hosted the participating teams.

== Preparations ==
=== Turnover ceremony ===
During the 2019 FIBA Basketball World Cup in China, the three host countries for the 2023 World Cup sent representatives to observe the tournament. The delegations also observed the FIBA Congress and the opening ceremonies.

A turnover ceremony was held at halftime of the final between Argentina and Spain at the Wukesong Arena in Beijing, to officially hand over the hosting rights of the FIBA Basketball World Cup from China to the three co-hosting countries. FIBA Central Board members Manuel V. Pangilinan from the Philippines, Yuko Mitsuya from Japan, and Erick Thohir from Indonesia, received the FIBA Flag from Chinese Basketball Association chairman Yao Ming. Other dignitaries present at the turnover ceremony were then-FIBA President Horacio Muratore and FIBA Basketball World Cup 2019 Global Ambassador Kobe Bryant.

=== FIBA Basketball World Cup 2023 Board ===
During the FIBA Executive Committee's meeting on 31 January 2020, International Olympic Committee and FIBA Executive Committee member Richard Carrión was appointed as the Chairman of the FIBA Basketball World Cup 2023 Board. FIBA Oceania Executive Director David Crocker will also be the tournament's Executive Director. The first meeting of the board took place on the final week of May 2020.

=== Governmental support ===
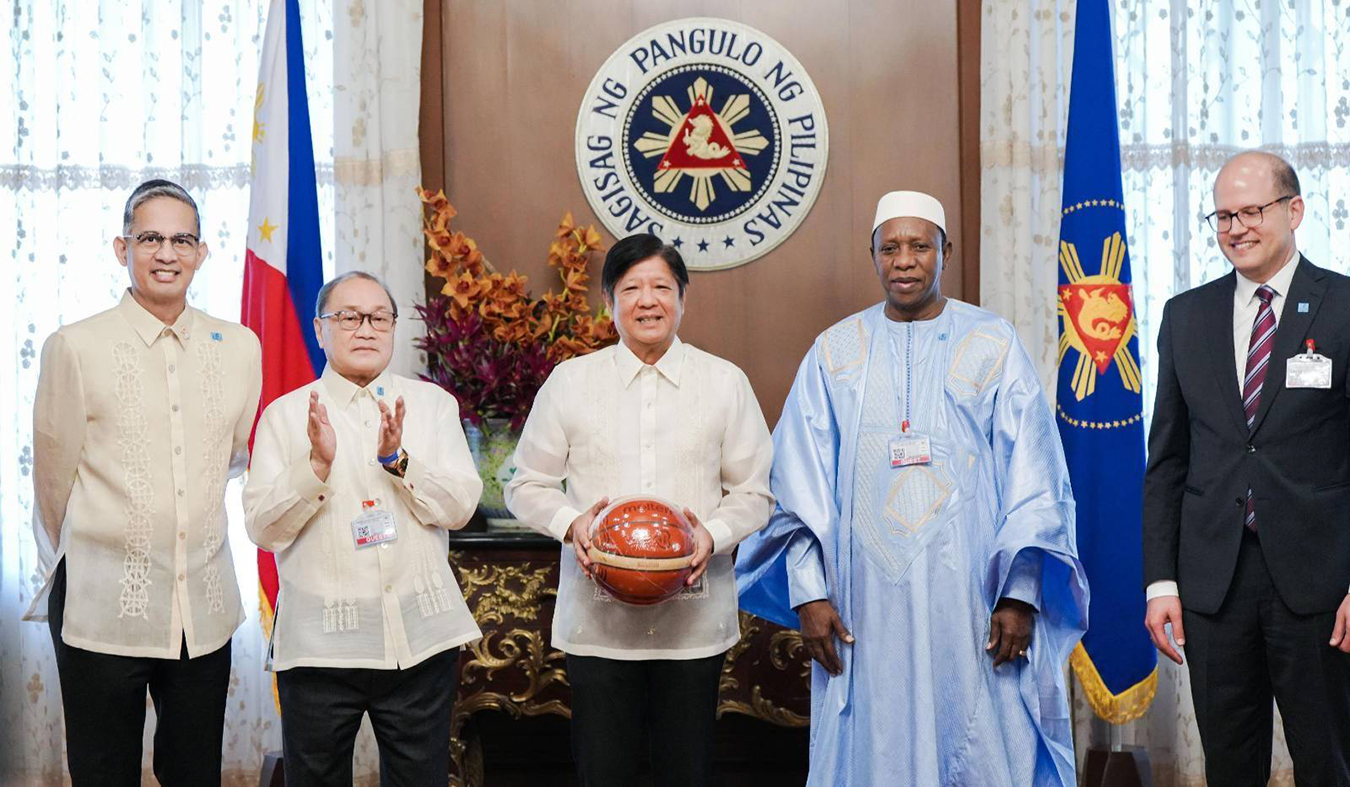
Philippine president Bongbong Marcos (center) in a courtesy call with members of the FIBA Central Board in April 2023 ahead of the 2023 Basketball World Cup draw.

In February 2020, then-Indonesian Youth and Sports Minister Zainudin Amali revealed plans for a new arena to be built in Jakarta for the tournament, with a capacity of between 15,000 and 20,000. Indonesian president Joko Widodo granted a permit for its construction, with the Indonesian government funding the construction of the new arena for the country's hosting of the World Cup. This would be the Indonesia Arena, located within the Gelora Bung Karno Sports Complex. Widodo led the topping-off ceremony of the Indonesia Arena on 13 January 2023, with opening expected to be in June 2023, a few months before the start of the tournament. President Widodo and Acting Governor of Jakarta Heru Budi Hartono officially inaugurated the Indonesia Arena on 7 August 2023. A budget of IDR 135 billion was granted by the Indonesian government, through the country's Ministry of Youth and Sports, to the Indonesian Basketball Association and the local organizing committee for the country's hosting of the tournament.

On 25 August 2020, three years before the start of the tournament, Okinawa City officials conducted a symposium on the construction of an acceptable system for the World Cup. The local organizing committee for the city's hosting was also formed during the same event. In attendance were Okinawa City Mayor Sachio Kuwae, Okinawa Chamber of Commerce president Toshiyuki Miyazato, and Ryukyu Golden Kings president Tatsuro Kimura.

Philippine president Bongbong Marcos signed an administrative order on 27 March 2023, creating an inter-agency task force to prepare for the country's hosting of the World Cup, involving several government agencies. The task force is to be led by Philippine Sports Commission (PSC) Chairman Richard Bachmann. The PSC approved the release of at least ₱800 million for the Philippines' hosting. Classes in public schools and government work in Metro Manila and Bulacan were suspended for the tournament's opening ceremony on 25 August 2023. The traffic number coding scheme in Metro Manila was also suspended on that day.

=== Test events ===
The Okinawa Arena hosted a "pre-opening event" from April to May 2021, which consisted of home games of the Ryukyu Golden Kings. Full operations of the arena began in June 2021.

On 28 June 2023, a test event organized by the Samahang Basketbol ng Pilipinas featuring eight collegiate teams from the Philippine NCAA and UAAP was held at the SM Mall of Asia Arena and Araneta Coliseum as a simulation for the Philippines' hosting of the World Cup.

A test event at the Indonesia Arena, the Indonesia International Basketball Invitation, took place from 2–5 August, that involved the national teams of Indonesia, Syria, and the United Arab Emirates.

=== Volunteers program ===
A Volunteers Program for the Philippines was also launched by the country's Local Organizing Committee on 30 November 2022, opening applications for aspiring applicants to serve as volunteers during the World Cup. The Japanese and Indonesian equivalents were launched on 27 February and 11 March 2023, respectively.

== Preparation games ==
Acropolis International Basketball Tournament

The national teams of Serbia, Greece, and Italy participated in the tournament from 8 to 10 August in Athens.

Basketball SuperCup

On 12 and 13 August 2023, Canada, China, Germany, and New Zealand participated in the 34th edition of the tournament in Hamburg.

China tournaments

From 2–6 August, the Heyuan WUS International Basketball Tournament was held in Heyuan in Guangdong province and involved the national teams of Iran, the Philippines and Senegal. Shenzhen hosted the FIBA Solidarity Cup from 20 to 21 August featuring Brazil, China, Italy, New Zealand, and Serbia.

France Summer Tour

On 26 February 2023, the Fédération Française de Basketball announced that France played in various participation games from July to August in the build-up to the World Cup – against the national teams of Tunisia, Argentina, Lithuania, Montenegro, and Venezuela.

Japan games

Japan played two games against Taiwan from 8–9 July in Hamamatsu and two games against New Zealand on 2 and 4 August in Ōta City. A four-nation warm-up tournament featuring Angola, France, Japan, and Slovenia also took place in Tokyo from 15 to 19 August.

Boomers vs World

Basketball Australia announced on 19 May 2023 that from 14 to 17 August, a four-nation tournament featuring Australia, Brazil, South Sudan and Venezuela, took place in Melbourne.

Spain tournaments

In celebration of the Spanish Basketball Federation's centennial anniversary, two tournaments were hosted in the Spanish cities of Málaga and Granada. Spain played in both tournaments. The first tournament in Málaga from 11 to 13 August featured the United States and Slovenia, while the second tournament in Granada from 17 to 19 August featured the Dominican Republic and Canada.

Tbilisi City Hall Cup

Georgia, Iran, Jordan, and Montenegro took part in the tournament from 12 to 13 August in Tbilisi.

Trentino Cup

On 7 June 2023, the Italian Basketball Federation announced that warm-up games featuring Cape Verde, China, Italy, and Turkey were played from 4 to 5 August in Trento. It also served as warm-up games for Turkey in preparation for the FIBA Olympic Pre-Qualifying Tournaments, which they would be hosting one of two European tournaments.

USA Basketball Showcase in Abu Dhabi

At a press conference in Berlin on 8 March 2023, USA Basketball announced a partnership with the Abu Dhabi's Department of Culture and Tourism, in which the United States faced the national teams of Germany and Greece from 18 to 20 August in Abu Dhabi, United Arab Emirates.

Other games

Exhibition games took place as warm-ups for the World Cup.

Slovenia and Greece played in two games on 2 and 4 August in Ljubljana and Athens, respectively. Spain and Venezuela also played a friendly game on 4 August in Madrid. Germany and Canada played in Berlin on 9 August.

Several teams also have set up training camps in various countries, including co-hosts Philippines, which held a training camp in Estonia and Lithuania in June 2023, where they played games against Finland, Estonia and Ukraine's junior teams, and a Lithuanian pro selection.

== Format ==
Similar to the 2019 edition, the tournament will be played in three phases – the group stage, the second round, and the final phase. In the group stage, the 32 qualified teams will be sorted into eight groups of four (A–H), where every team in a group will play each other once. The top two teams from each group will then advance to the second round. The bottom two teams will then play two classification games to determine the 17th to 32nd rankings. In the second round, there will be four groups (I–L) of four made up of the teams that advanced from the first round, with these groups formed by joining pairs of first round groups together (A & B to I, C & D to J, E & F to K, and G & H to L). Each team plays two games in the second round, one against each of the teams they have not yet played. The top two teams from groups I to L will qualify for the final phase, with all five group stage games counting towards their records. The teams that lost in the quarterfinals will then play classification games to determine the 5th to 8th rankings.

== Officiating ==
On 16 August 2023, FIBA announced the list of 44 referees for the tournament. Of the 44 referees, FIBA included three each from Latvia, Puerto Rico, and the United States.

Female referees will officiate games for the first time in the tournament's history. American referees Amy Bonner, Blanca Burns and Jenna Reneau became the first female referees to be appointed to a men's World Cup. Bonner previously officiated in the last three editions of the FIBA Women's Basketball World Cup in 2014, 2018, and 2022, respectively. Burns and Reneau recently officiated several games in the Americas Qualifiers for the tournament. Burns eventually became the first ever female referee to officiate a World Cup game when she worked the Finland vs. Australia game in Group E on 25 August in Okinawa.

French referee Yohan Rosso, who was one of the three officials in the 2019 final was also selected.

=== Referees ===
- Juan Fernández (ARG)
- Leandro Zalazar (ARG)
- Scott Beker (AUS)
- Ademir Zurapović (BIH)
- Guilherme Locatelli (BRA)
- Martin Horozov (BUL)
- Matthew Kallio (CAN)
- Waseem Husainy (CAN)
- Carlos Vélez (COL)
- Martin Vulić (CRO)
- Carlos Peralta (ECU)
- Kristian Paez (ECU)
- Wael Mostafa (EGY)
- Yohan Rosso (FRA)
- Georgios Poursanidis (GRE)
- Péter Praksch (HUN)
- Manuel Attard (ITA)
- Manuel Mazzoni (ITA)
- Ahmed Al-Shuwaili (IRQ)
- Daigo Urushima (JPN)
- Takaki Kato (JPN)
- Yevgeniy Mikheyev (KAZ)
- Andris Aunkrogers (LAT)
- Gatis Saliņš (LAT)
- Mārtiņš Kozlovskis (LAT)
- Rabah Noujaim (LBN)
- Gvidas Gedvilas (LTU)
- Omar Bermúdez (MEX)
- Julio Anaya (PAN)
- Wojciech Liszka (POL)
- Johnny Batista (PUR)
- Jorge Vázquez (PUR)
- Roberto Vázquez (PUR)
- Aleksandar Glišić (SRB)
- Boris Krejič (SLO)
- Luis Castillo (ESP)
- Antonio Conde (ESP)
- Park Kyoung-jin (KOR)
- Kerem Baki (TUR)
- Amy Bonner (USA)
- Blanca Burns (USA)
- Jenna Reneau (USA)
- Andrés Bartel (URU)
- Daniel García (VEN)

== Opening ceremonies ==
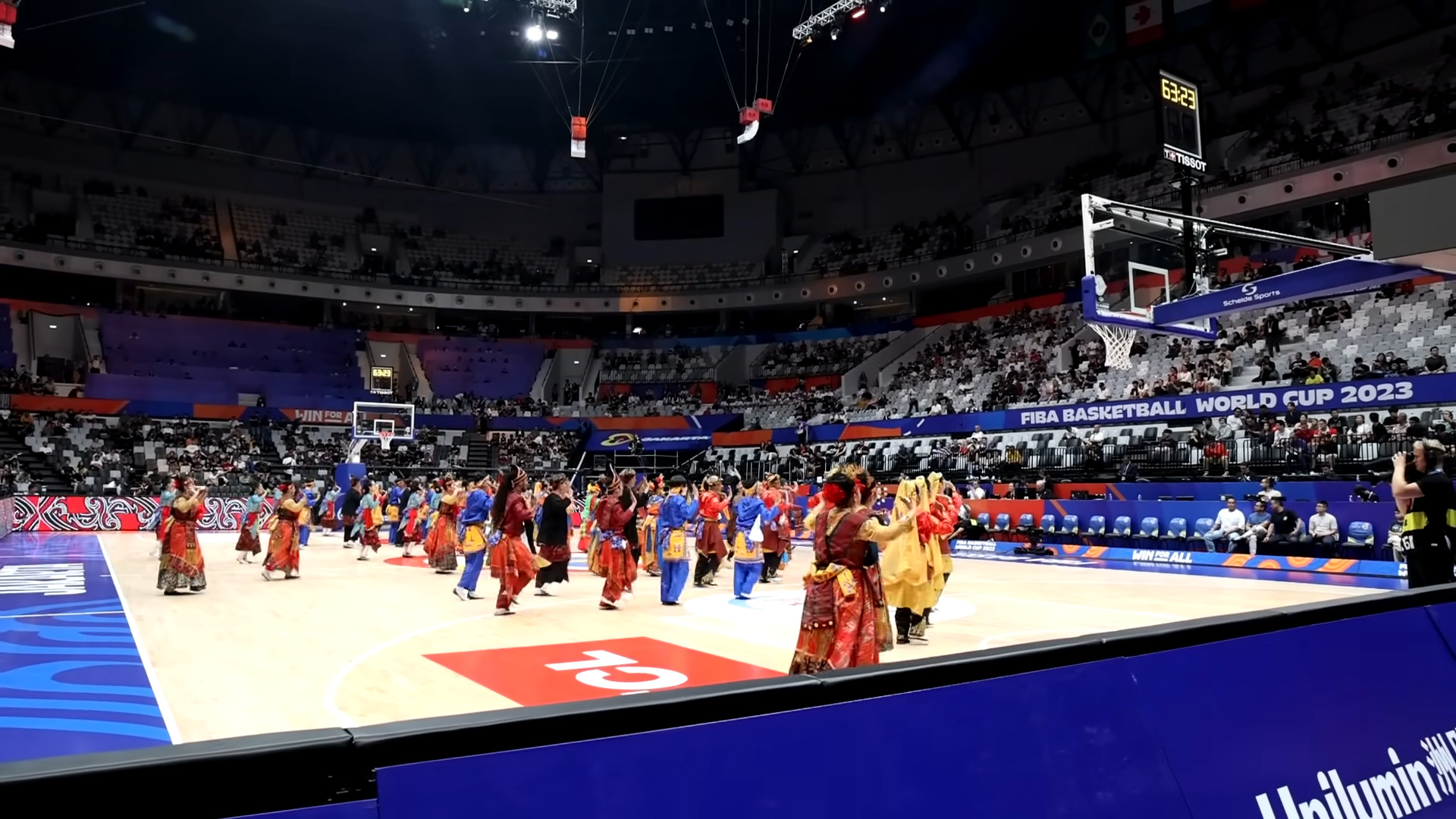
Opening ceremony at the Indonesia Arena in Jakarta.

The main opening ceremony took place in the Philippines on Friday, 25 August 2023 at the Philippine Arena in Bocaue, in between the first two games of Group A (Angola vs. Italy; and Dominican Republic vs. Philippines). It featured performances from artist Sarah Geronimo with rapper Bernard Bernardo, and Filipino bands The Dawn and Ben&Ben, and boy group Alamat. The 1978 FIBA World Championship Philippine team accepted an invitation to attend. Philippine president Bongbong Marcos was originally scheduled to make the ceremonial ball toss in Bocaue, but was unable to after arriving late in the venue for an undisclosed reason.

Another ceremony took place in one of the two co-hosts. It was held on the same day at a later time at the Indonesia Arena in Jakarta, before the Group H game between Canada and France and featured a performance from Indonesian singer and actress Agnez Mo. Indonesian president Joko Widodo was to attend live but was not able to. Instead, he delivered a short speech and opened the tournament in Indonesia via a pre-recorded video.

Both ceremonies and another at the Okinawa Arena in Japan featured performances highlighting the cultures of the host countries. The ceremony in Okinawa took place before the start of the Group E game between Germany and co-hosts Japan. Japanese Prime Minister Fumio Kishida conducted the ceremonial ball toss.

== First round ==
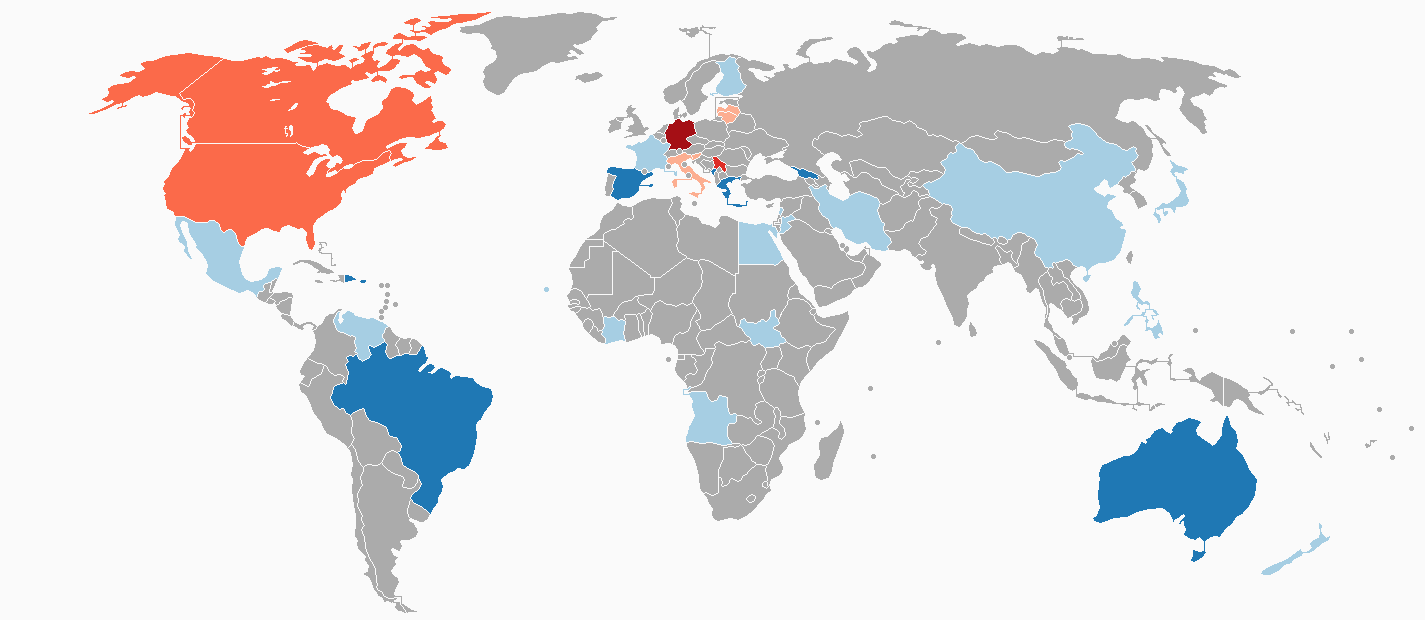
Result of countries participating in the 2023 FIBA Basketball World Cup: First round Second round Quarter-finals Semi-finals Runners-up Champions

=== Classification of teams ===
1. Highest number of points earned, with each game result having a corresponding point:
  - Win: 2 points
  - Loss: 1 point
  - Loss by default: 1 point, with a final score of 2–0 for the opponents of the defaulting team if the latter team is not trailing or if the score is tied, or the score at the time of stoppage if they are trailing.
  - Loss by forfeit: 0 points, with a final score of 20–0 for the opponents of the forfeiting team.
2. Head-to-head record via points system above
3. Point difference in games among tied teams
4. Points for in games among tied teams
5. Point difference in all group games
6. Points for in all group games

=== Group A ===
Venues:

- Philippine Arena, Bocaue, Bulacan
- Araneta Coliseum, Quezon City

Pos	Team	Pld	W	L	PF	PA	PD	Pts	Qualification
1	Dominican Republic	3	3	0	249	230	+19	6	Second round
2	Italy	3	2	1	253	237	+16	5	Second round
3	Angola	3	1	2	214	226	−12	4	17th–32nd classification
4	Philippines (H)	3	0	3	234	257	−23	3	17th–32nd classification

Source: FIBA
Rules for classification: Tiebreakers
(H) Hosts

25 August 2023
Angola	67–81	Italy
Dominican Republic	87–81	Philippines
27 August 2023
Italy	82–87	Dominican Republic
Philippines	70–80	Angola
29 August 2023
Angola	67–75	Dominican Republic
Philippines	83–90	Italy

=== Group B ===
Venue: Araneta Coliseum, Quezon City

Pos	Team	Pld	W	L	PF	PA	PD	Pts	Qualification
1	Serbia	3	3	0	314	223	+91	6	Second round
2	Puerto Rico	3	2	1	285	279	+6	5	Second round
3	South Sudan	3	1	2	268	285	−17	4	17th–32nd classification
4	China	3	0	3	221	301	−80	3	17th–32nd classification

Source: FIBA
Rules for classification: Tiebreakers

26 August 2023
South Sudan	96–101 (OT)	Puerto Rico
Serbia	105–63	China
28 August 2023
China	69–89	South Sudan
Puerto Rico	77–94	Serbia
30 August 2023
South Sudan	83–115	Serbia
China	89–107	Puerto Rico

=== Group C ===
Venue: Mall of Asia Arena, Pasay

Pos	Team	Pld	W	L	PF	PA	PD	Pts	Qualification
1	United States	3	3	0	318	215	+103	6	Second round
2	Greece	3	2	1	256	254	+2	5	Second round
3	New Zealand	3	1	2	241	269	−28	4	17th–32nd classification
4	Jordan	3	0	3	220	297	−77	3	17th–32nd classification

Source: FIBA
Rules for classification: Tiebreakers

26 August 2023
Jordan	71–92	Greece
United States	99–72	New Zealand
28 August 2023
New Zealand	95–87 (OT)	Jordan
Greece	81–109	United States
30 August 2023
United States	110–62	Jordan
Greece	83–74	New Zealand

=== Group D ===
Venue: Mall of Asia Arena, Pasay

Pos	Team	Pld	W	L	PF	PA	PD	Pts	Qualification
1	Lithuania	3	3	0	280	204	+76	6	Second round
2	Montenegro	3	2	1	251	236	+15	5	Second round
3	Egypt	3	1	2	241	254	−13	4	17th–32nd classification
4	Mexico	3	0	3	209	287	−78	3	17th–32nd classification

Source: FIBA
Rules for classification: Tiebreakers

25 August 2023
Mexico	71–91	Montenegro
Egypt	67–93	Lithuania
27 August 2023
Montenegro	89–74	Egypt
Lithuania	96–66	Mexico
29 August 2023
Egypt	100–72	Mexico
Montenegro	71–91	Lithuania

=== Group E ===
Venue: Okinawa Arena, Okinawa City

Pos	Team	Pld	W	L	PF	PA	PD	Pts	Qualification
1	Germany	3	3	0	267	220	+47	6	Second round
2	Australia	3	2	1	289	246	+43	5	Second round
3	Japan (H)	3	1	2	250	278	−28	4	17th–32nd classification
4	Finland	3	0	3	235	297	−62	3	17th–32nd classification

Source: FIBA
Rules for classification: Tiebreakers
(H) Hosts

25 August 2023
Finland	72–98	Australia
Germany	81–63	Japan
27 August 2023
Australia	82–85	Germany
Japan	98–88	Finland
29 August 2023
Germany	101–75	Finland
Australia	109–89	Japan

=== Group F ===
Venue: Okinawa Arena, Okinawa City

Pos	Team	Pld	W	L	PF	PA	PD	Pts	Qualification
1	Slovenia	3	3	0	280	229	+51	6	Second round
2	Georgia	3	2	1	222	207	+15	5	Second round
3	Cape Verde	3	1	2	218	252	−34	4	17th–32nd classification
4	Venezuela	3	0	3	219	251	−32	3	17th–32nd classification

Source: FIBA
Rules for classification: Tiebreakers

26 August 2023
Cape Verde	60–85	Georgia
Slovenia	100–85	Venezuela
28 August 2023
Venezuela	75–81	Cape Verde
Georgia	67–88	Slovenia
30 August 2023
Georgia	70–59	Venezuela
Slovenia	92–77	Cape Verde

=== Group G ===
Venue: Indonesia Arena, Jakarta

Pos	Team	Pld	W	L	PF	PA	PD	Pts	Qualification
1	Spain	3	3	0	275	207	+68	6	Second round
2	Brazil	3	2	1	267	232	+35	5	Second round
3	Ivory Coast	3	1	2	212	252	−40	4	17th–32nd classification
4	Iran	3	0	3	193	256	−63	3	17th–32nd classification

Source: FIBA
Rules for classification: Tiebreakers

26 August 2023
Iran	59–100	Brazil
Spain	94–64	Ivory Coast
28 August 2023
Ivory Coast	71–69	Iran
Brazil	78–96	Spain
30 August 2023
Ivory Coast	77–89	Brazil
Iran	65–85	Spain

=== Group H ===
Venue: Indonesia Arena, Jakarta

Pos	Team	Pld	W	L	PF	PA	PD	Pts	Qualification
1	Canada	3	3	0	324	213	+111	6	Second round
2	Latvia	3	2	1	272	257	+15	5	Second round
3	France	3	1	2	236	262	−26	4	17th–32nd classification
4	Lebanon	3	0	3	222	322	−100	3	17th–32nd classification

Source: FIBA
Rules for classification: Tiebreakers

25 August 2023
Latvia	109–70	Lebanon
Canada	95–65	France
27 August 2023
Lebanon	73–128	Canada
France	86–88	Latvia
29 August 2023
Lebanon	79–85	France
Canada	101–75	Latvia

== Second round ==
The results of the three preliminary round matches are carried over to the second round.

=== Group I ===
Venue: Araneta Coliseum, Quezon City

Pos	Team	Pld	W	L	PF	PA	PD	Pts	Qualification
1	Italy	5	4	1	404	370	+34	9 (Note: Italy 1–0 Serbia)	Quarter-finals
2	Serbia	5	4	1	502	380	+122	9	Quarter-finals
3	Puerto Rico	5	3	2	444	449	−5	8 (Note: Puerto Rico 1–0 Dominican Republic)	
4	Dominican Republic	5	3	2	425	444	−19	8	

Source: FIBA
Rules for classification: Tiebreakers
Notes:

1 September 2023
Serbia	76–78	Italy
Dominican Republic	97–102	Puerto Rico
3 September 2023
Italy	73–57	Puerto Rico
Dominican Republic	79–112	Serbia

=== Group J ===
Venue: Mall of Asia Arena, Pasay

Pos	Team	Pld	W	L	PF	PA	PD	Pts	Qualification
1	Lithuania	5	5	0	482	375	+107	10	Quarter-finals
2	United States	5	4	1	507	398	+109	9	Quarter-finals
3	Montenegro	5	3	2	397	390	+7	8	
4	Greece	5	2	3	392	419	−27	7	

Source: FIBA
Rules for classification: Tiebreakers

1 September 2023
United States	85–73	Montenegro
Lithuania	92–67	Greece
3 September 2023
Greece	69–73	Montenegro
United States	104–110	Lithuania

=== Group K ===
Venue: Okinawa Arena, Okinawa City

Pos	Team	Pld	W	L	PF	PA	PD	Pts	Qualification
1	Germany	5	5	0	467	364	+103	10	Quarter-finals
2	Slovenia	5	4	1	442	409	+33	9	Quarter-finals
3	Australia	5	3	2	469	421	+48	8	
4	Georgia	5	2	3	379	407	−28	7	

Source: FIBA
Rules for classification: Tiebreakers

1 September 2023
Germany	100–73	Georgia
Slovenia	91–80	Australia
3 September 2023
Australia	100–84	Georgia
Germany	100–71	Slovenia

=== Group L ===
Venue: Indonesia Arena, Jakarta

Pos	Team	Pld	W	L	PF	PA	PD	Pts	Qualification
1	Canada	5	4	1	477	367	+110	9 (Note: Canada 1–0 Latvia)	Quarter-finals
2	Latvia	5	4	1	450	410	+40	9	Quarter-finals
3	Spain	5	3	2	429	369	+60	8 (Note: Spain 1–0 Brazil)	
4	Brazil	5	3	2	420	401	+19	8	

Source: FIBA
Rules for classification: Tiebreakers
Notes:

1 September 2023
Spain	69–74	Latvia
Canada	65–69	Brazil
3 September 2023
Brazil	84–104	Latvia
Spain	85–88	Canada

== 17th–32nd classification round ==
The results of the three preliminary round matches are carried over to the 17th–32nd classification round.

=== Group M ===
Venue: Araneta Coliseum, Quezon City

Pos	Team	Pld	W	L	PF	PA	PD	Pts
1	South Sudan	5	3	2	456	431	+25	8
2	Philippines (H)	5	1	4	398	419	−21	6 (Note: Philippines 3 Pts, +11 PD; Angola 3 Pts, +3 PD; China 3 Pts, −14 PD)
3	Angola	5	1	4	368	410	−42	6
4	China	5	1	4	379	473	−94	6

Source: FIBA
Rules for classification: Tiebreakers
(H) Hosts
Notes:

31 August 2023
Angola	76–83	China
South Sudan	87–68	Philippines
2 September 2023
Angola	78–101	South Sudan
Philippines	96–75	China

=== Group N ===
Venue: Mall of Asia Arena, Pasay

Pos	Team	Pld	W	L	PF	PA	PD	Pts
1	Egypt	5	2	3	412	411	+1	7 (Note: Egypt 3 Pts, +26 PD; New Zealand 3 Pts, −6 PD; Mexico 3 Pts, −20 PD)
2	New Zealand	5	2	3	429	463	−34	7
3	Mexico	5	2	3	410	467	−57	7
4	Jordan	5	0	5	369	475	−106	5

Source: FIBA
Rules for classification: Tiebreakers
Notes:

31 August 2023
New Zealand	100–108	Mexico
Egypt	85–69	Jordan
2 September 2023
New Zealand	88–86	Egypt
Jordan	80–93	Mexico

=== Group O ===
Venue: Okinawa Arena, Okinawa City

Pos	Team	Pld	W	L	PF	PA	PD	Pts
1	Japan (H)	5	3	2	416	426	−10	8
2	Finland	5	2	3	425	449	−24	7
3	Cape Verde	5	1	4	366	432	−66	6
4	Venezuela	5	0	5	371	427	−56	5

Source: FIBA
Rules for classification: Tiebreakers
(H) Hosts

31 August 2023
Cape Verde	77–100	Finland
Japan	86–77	Venezuela
2 September 2023
Finland	90–75	Venezuela
Japan	80–71	Cape Verde

=== Group P ===
Venue: Indonesia Arena, Jakarta

Pos	Team	Pld	W	L	PF	PA	PD	Pts
1	France	5	3	2	405	394	+11	8
2	Lebanon	5	2	3	397	479	−82	7
3	Ivory Coast	5	1	4	373	433	−60	6
4	Iran	5	0	5	321	419	−98	5

Source: FIBA
Rules for classification: Tiebreakers

31 August 2023
Ivory Coast	84–94	Lebanon
France	82–55	Iran
2 September 2023
Ivory Coast	77–87	France
Iran	73–81	Lebanon

== Final round ==
Venue: Mall of Asia Arena, Pasay

Fifth place
9 September
Latvia	98
Lithuania	63
Seventh place
9 September
Italy	85
Slovenia	89

5th–8th classification
7 September
Italy	82
Latvia	87
7 September
Lithuania	100
Slovenia	84

Quarter-finals
5 September
Italy	63
United States	100
6 September
Germany	81
Latvia	79
5 September
Lithuania	68
Serbia	87
6 September
Canada	100
Slovenia	89

Semi-finals
8 September
United States	111
Germany	113
8 September
Serbia	95
Canada	86

Final
10 September
Germany	83
Serbia	77
Third place game
10 September
United States	118
Canada (OT)	127

=== Quarter-finals ===
5 September 2023
16:45

Boxscore

Lithuania	68–87	Serbia
Scoring by quarter: 25–24, 13–25, 17–24, 13–14
Pts: Sedekerskis 14; Rebs: Sedekerskis 9 Asts: Jokubaitis 9		Pts: Bogdanović 21; Rebs: Petrušev 6 Asts: Gudurić 6

Mall of Asia Arena, Pasay
Attendance: 6,223
Referees: Omar Bermúdez (MEX), Mārtiņš Kozlovskis (LAT), Johnny Batista (PUR)

5 September 2023
20:40

Boxscore

Italy	63–100	United States
Scoring by quarter: 14–24, 10–22, 20–37, 19–17
Pts: Fontecchio 18; Rebs: Melli 9 Asts: Tonut 5		Pts: Bridges 24; Rebs: Bridges, Portis 7 Asts: Haliburton 5

Mall of Asia Arena, Pasay
Attendance: 9,764
Referees: Julio Anaya (PAN), Ademir Zurapović (BIH), Juan Fernández (ARG)

6 September 2023
16:45

Boxscore

Germany	81–79	Latvia
Scoring by quarter: 13–16, 23–18, 26–25, 19–20
Pts: F. Wagner 16; Rebs: Theis, F. Wagner 8 Asts: Schröder 4		Pts: Žagars 24; Rebs: R. Kurucs 10; Asts: Žagars 8

Mall of Asia Arena, Pasay
Attendance: 7,584
Referees: Antonio Conde (ESP), Yohan Rosso (FRA), Martin Vulić (CRO)

6 September 2023
20:30

Boxscore

Canada	100–89	Slovenia
Scoring by quarter: 26–24, 24–26, 30–21, 20–18
Pts: Gilgeous-Alexander 31; Rebs: Gilgeous-Alexander 10; Asts: Gilgeous-Alexander, Olynyk 4		Pts: Dončić 26; Rebs: Tobey 6 Asts: Dončić 5

Mall of Asia Arena, Pasay
Attendance: 11,710
Referees: Roberto Vázquez (PUR), Manuel Mazzoni (ITA), Gatis Saliņš (LAT)

=== Classification semi-finals ===
7 September 2023
16:45

Boxscore

Italy	82–87	Latvia
Scoring by quarter: 26–18, 16–28, 18–21, 22–20
Pts: Datome 20; Rebs: Melli 9 Asts: Spissu 7		Pts: Gražulis 28; Rebs: Gražulis 6 Asts: Šķēle 9

Mall of Asia Arena, Pasay
Attendance: 4,579
Referees: Ademir Zurapović (BIH), Takaki Kato (JPN), Blanca Burns (USA)

7 September 2023
20:30

Boxscore

Lithuania	100–84	Slovenia
Scoring by quarter: 33–21, 20–22, 22–20, 25–21
Pts: Valančiūnas 24; Rebs: Valančiūnas 12; Asts: Kariniauskas 10		Pts: Dončić 29; Rebs: Tobey 9 Asts: Dragić 3

Mall of Asia Arena, Pasay
Attendance: 11,003
Referees: Matthew Kallio (CAN), Omar Bermúdez (MEX), Johnny Batista (PUR)

=== Semi-finals ===
8 September 2023
16:45

Boxscore

Serbia	95–86	Canada
Scoring by quarter: 23–15, 29–24, 23–24, 20–23
Pts: Bogdanović 23; Rebs: Milutinov 10; Asts: S. Jović 5		Pts: Barrett 23; Rebs: five players 3 Asts: Gilgeous-Alexander 9

Mall of Asia Arena, Pasay
Attendance: 8,630
Referees: Yohan Rosso (FRA), Julio Anaya (PAN), Manuel Mazzoni (ITA)

8 September 2023
20:40

Boxscore

United States	111–113	Germany
Scoring by quarter: 31–33, 29–26, 24–35, 27–19
Pts: Edwards 23; Rebs: Edwards 8 Asts: Haliburton 8		Pts: Obst 24; Rebs: Theis, Voigtmann 7 Asts: Schröder 9

Mall of Asia Arena, Pasay
Attendance: 11,011
Referees: Antonio Conde (ESP), Boris Krejič (SLO), Gatis Saliņš (LAT)

=== Seventh place game ===
9 September 2023
16:45

Boxscore

Italy	85–89	Slovenia
Scoring by quarter: 18–15, 23–27, 19–28, 25–19
Pts: Spissu 22; Rebs: Polonara 7 Asts: Melli 5		Pts: Dončić 29; Rebs: Dončić 10; Asts: Dončić 8

Mall of Asia Arena, Pasay
Attendance: 10,775
Referees: Ademir Zurapović (BIH), Mārtiņš Kozlovskis (LAT), Martin Vulić (CRO)

=== Fifth place game ===
9 September 2023
20:30

Boxscore

Latvia	98–63	Lithuania
Scoring by quarter: 28–20, 21–18, 28–9, 21–16
Pts: A. Kurucs 20; Rebs: four players 6 Asts: Žagars 17		Pts: Jokubaitis 16; Rebs: Sedekerskis 10; Asts: Brazdeikis 3

Mall of Asia Arena, Pasay
Attendance: 9,440
Referees: Manuel Mazzoni (ITA), Blanca Burns (USA), Johnny Batista (PUR)

=== Third place game ===
10 September 2023
16:30

Boxscore

United States	118–127 (OT)	Canada
Scoring by quarter: 25–34, 31–24, 26–33, 29–20, Overtime: 7–16
Pts: Edwards 24; Rebs: Bridges 9 Asts: Haliburton 7		Pts: Brooks 39; Rebs: Barrett, Powell 7 Asts: Gilgeous-Alexander 12

Mall of Asia Arena, Pasay
Attendance: 10,666
Referees: Julio Anaya (PAN), Takaki Kato (JPN), Antonio Conde (ESP)

=== Final ===
10 September 2023
20:40

Boxscore

Germany	83–77	Serbia
Scoring by quarter: 23–26, 24–21, 22–10, 14–20
Pts: Schröder 28; Rebs: Voigtmann 8 Asts: Voigtmann 3		Pts: Avramović 21; Rebs: N. Jović 8 Asts: Bogdanović 5

Mall of Asia Arena, Pasay
Attendance: 12,022
Referees: Roberto Vázquez (PUR), Omar Bermúdez (MEX), Gatis Saliņš (LAT)

== Final standings ==
Pos	Team	Pld	W	L	PF	PA	PD	Pts	Qualification
1st place, gold medalist(s)	Germany (Note: Germany and Serbia qualified to the Summer Olympics as two top teams from FIBA Europe.)	8	8	0	744	631	+113	16	Qualification to Summer Olympics
2nd place, silver medalist(s)	Serbia	8	6	2	761	617	+144	14	Qualification to Summer Olympics
3rd place, bronze medalist(s)	Canada (Note: Canada and United States qualified to the Summer Olympics as two top teams from FIBA Americas.)	8	6	2	790	669	+121	14	Qualification to Summer Olympics
4	United States	8	5	3	836	701	+135	13	Qualification to Summer Olympics
5	Latvia	8	6	2	714	636	+78	14	Qualification to Olympic Qualifying Tournament (Note: Of the teams who do not qualify directly to the Summer Olympics, the following teams proceed to an Olympic Qualifying Tournament: the highest-ranked team from Africa, the highest-ranked team from the Americas, the highest-ranked team from Asia and Oceania and the best 16 of the remaining teams.)
6	Lithuania	8	6	2	713	644	+69	14	Qualification to Olympic Qualifying Tournament
7	Slovenia	8	5	3	704	694	+10	13	Qualification to Olympic Qualifying Tournament
8	Italy	8	4	4	634	646	−12	12	Qualification to Olympic Qualifying Tournament
9	Spain	5	3	2	429	369	+60	8	Qualification to Olympic Qualifying Tournament
10	Australia (Note: Australia qualified to the Summer Olympics as top team from FIBA Oceania.)	5	3	2	469	421	+48	8	Qualification to Summer Olympics
11	Montenegro	5	3	2	397	390	+7	8	Qualification to Olympic Qualifying Tournament
12	Puerto Rico (Note: Puerto Rico qualified to the Olympic Qualifying Tournament as the third-best team from FIBA Americas.)	5	3	2	444	449	−5	8	Qualification to Olympic Qualifying Tournament
13	Brazil	5	3	2	420	401	+19	8	Qualification to Olympic Qualifying Tournament
14	Dominican Republic	5	3	2	425	444	−19	8	Qualification to Olympic Qualifying Tournament
15	Greece	5	2	3	392	419	−27	7	Qualification to Olympic Qualifying Tournament
16	Georgia	5	2	3	379	407	−28	7	Qualification to Olympic Qualifying Tournament
17	South Sudan (Note: South Sudan qualified to the Summer Olympics as top team from FIBA Africa.)	5	3	2	456	431	+25	8	Qualification to Summer Olympics
18	France (Note: France qualified to the Summer Olympics as host country.)	5	3	2	405	394	+11	8	Already qualified to Summer Olympics
19	Japan (Note: Japan qualified to the Summer Olympics as top team from FIBA Asia.) (H)	5	3	2	416	426	−10	8	Qualification to Summer Olympics
20	Egypt (Note: Egypt qualified to the Olympic Qualifying Tournament as the second-best team from FIBA Africa.)	5	2	3	412	411	+1	7	Qualification to Olympic Qualifying Tournament
21	Finland	5	2	3	425	449	−24	7	Qualification to Olympic Qualifying Tournament
22	New Zealand (Note: New Zealand qualified to the Olympic Qualifying Tournament as the better team between the second-best from FIBA Asia and the second-best from FIBA Oceania.)	5	2	3	429	463	−34	7	Qualification to Olympic Qualifying Tournament
23	Lebanon	5	2	3	397	479	−82	7	Qualification to Olympic Qualifying Tournament
24	Philippines (H)	5	1	4	398	419	−21	6	Qualification to Olympic Qualifying Tournament
25	Mexico	5	2	3	410	467	−57	7	Qualification to Olympic Qualifying Tournament
26	Angola	5	1	4	368	410	−42	6	Qualification to Olympic Qualifying Tournament
27	Ivory Coast	5	1	4	373	433	−60	6	Qualification to Olympic Qualifying Tournament
28	Cape Verde	5	1	4	366	432	−66	6	
29	China	5	1	4	379	473	−94	6	
30	Venezuela	5	0	5	371	427	−56	5	
31	Iran	5	0	5	321	419	−98	5	
32	Jordan	5	0	5	369	475	−106	5	

Source: FIBA
Rules for classification: 1) Positions in each group; 2) Win / Loss ratio; 3) Points difference; 4) Points scored; 5) Drawing of lots.
(H) Hosts

== Olympic qualification ==
Qualification to 2024 Summer Olympics
Host	France
Zone	Team
Africa	South Sudan
Americas	Canada, United States
Asia	Japan
Europe	Germany, Serbia
Oceania	Australia

Qualification to Olympic Qualifying Tournament
Zone	Team
Africa	Angola,Egypt, Ivory Coast
Americas	Brazil, Dominican Republic, Mexico, Puerto Rico
Asia	Lebanon, Philippines
Europe	Finland, Georgia, Greece, Italy, Latvia, Lithuania, Montenegro, Slovenia, Spain
Oceania	New Zealand

== Awards ==
The all-star teams, MVP and other awards were announced on 10 September 2023.

2023 FIBA Basketball World Cup champion

Germany
1st title

=== All-Tournament Team ===
All-Star Team
(Germany) Dennis Schröder
(Canada) Shai Gilgeous-Alexander
(United States) Anthony Edwards
(Serbia) Bogdan Bogdanović
(Slovenia) Luka Dončić
All-Second Team
(Latvia) Artūrs Žagars
(Italy) Simone Fontecchio
(Lithuania) Jonas Valančiūnas
(Serbia) Nikola Milutinov
(Germany) Franz Wagner
MVP: (Germany) Dennis Schröder
Rising star: (Australia) Josh Giddey
Best defensive player: (Canada) Dillon Brooks
Best coach: (Latvia) / (Italy) Luca Banchi

== Statistical leaders ==
=== Player tournament average ===
Points
#	Player	Pld	Pts	PPG
1	(Slovenia) Luka Dončić	8	216	27.0
2	(Philippines) Jordan Clarkson	5	130	26.0
3	(Finland) Lauri Markkanen	5	124	24.8
4	(Canada) Shai Gilgeous-Alexander	8	196	24.5
5	(Dominican Republic) Karl-Anthony Towns	5	122	24.4
6	(Jordan) Rondae Hollis-Jefferson	5	118	23.6
7	(Japan) Josh Hawkinson	5	105	21.0
8	(South Sudan) Carlik Jones	5	102	20.4
9	(Puerto Rico) Tremont Waters	5	100	20.0
10	(Montenegro) Nikola Vučević	5	99	19.8

Rebounds
#	Player	Pld	Rebs	RPG
1	(Cape Verde) Edy Tavares	5	62	12.4
2	(Japan) Josh Hawkinson	5	54	10.8
3	(Brazil) Bruno Caboclo	5	46	9.2
4	(Jordan) Ahmad Dwairi	5	45	9.0
5	(Montenegro) Nikola Vučević	5	44	8.8
6	(Lithuania) Jonas Valančiūnas	8	70	8.8
7	(Philippines) A. J. Edu	5	43	8.6
8	(Mexico) Fabián Jaimes	5	42	8.4
9	(Serbia) Nikola Milutinov	8	67	8.4
10	(France) Rudy Gobert	4	33	8.3

Assists
#	Player	Pld	Asts	APG
1	(South Sudan) Carlik Jones	5	52	10.4
2	(Puerto Rico) Tremont Waters	5	46	9.2
3	(New Zealand) Shea Ili	5	38	7.6
3	(Japan) Yuki Kawamura	5	38	7.6
5	(Latvia) Artūrs Žagars	8	59	7.4
6	(Brazil) Yago dos Santos	5	36	7.2
6	(Mexico) Paul Stoll	5	36	7.2
6	(Greece) Thomas Walkup	5	36	7.2
9	(Venezuela) Heissler Guillent	5	33	6.6
10	(Canada) Shai Gilgeous-Alexander	8	51	6.4

Steals
#	Player	Pld	Stls	SPG
1	(Egypt) Ehab Amin	5	13	2.6
1	(Puerto Rico) Tremont Waters	5	13	2.6
3	(Slovenia) Luka Dončić	8	20	2.5
4	(Mexico) Paul Stoll	5	12	2.4
5	(New Zealand) Izayah Le'afa	5	11	2.2
6	(Serbia) Bogdan Bogdanović	8	17	2.1
7	(Iran) Arsalan Kazemi	5	10	2.0
7	(Dominican Republic) Víctor Liz	5	10	2.0
7	(Jordan) Freddy Ibrahim	4	8	2.0
10	(Ivory Coast) Cédric Bah	5	9	1.8

Blocks
#	Player	Pld	Blks	BPG
1	(South Sudan) Wenyen Gabriel	5	13	2.6
2	(Egypt) Anas Mahmoud	5	11	2.2
3	(Greece) Georgios Papagiannis	5	9	1.8
3	(Cape Verde) Edy Tavares	5	9	1.8
3	(Japan) Yuta Watanabe	5	9	1.8
6	(France) Rudy Gobert	4	7	1.8
7	(France) Nicolas Batum	5	8	1.6
7	(Puerto Rico) George Conditt IV	5	8	1.6
7	(Jordan) Ahmad Dwairi	5	8	1.6
7	(Montenegro) Nikola Vučević	5	8	1.6

Minutes
#	Player	Pld	Mins	MPG
1	(Jordan) Rondae Hollis-Jefferson	5	192	38.6
2	(Philippines) Jordan Clarkson	5	179	35.9
3	(Puerto Rico) Tremont Waters	5	175	35.1
4	(Japan) Yuta Watanabe	5	175	35.0
5	(Egypt) Ehab Amin	5	175	35.0
6	(Japan) Josh Hawkinson	5	174	34.9
7	(Jordan) Freddy Ibrahim	4	134	33.6
8	(Jordan) Ahmad Dwairi	5	166	33.4
9	(Lebanon) Wael Arakji	4	128	32.2
10	(Slovenia) Luka Dončić	8	257	32.1

Field Goal Shooting
#	Player	FGM	FGA	FG%
1	(Egypt) Anas Mahmoud	31	43	72.1
2	(Dominican Republic) Andrés Feliz	28	41	68.3
3	(Latvia) Andrejs Gražulis	48	76	63.5
4	(Lithuania) Jonas Valančiūnas	45	72	62.5
4	(Slovenia) Mike Tobey	40	64	62.5
4	(Puerto Rico) Ismael Romero	25	40	62.5
7	(Canada) Dillon Brooks	41	69	59.4
8	(Germany) Daniel Theis	38	64	59.4
9	(Japan) Josh Hawkinson	30	51	58.8
10	(Spain) Willy Hernangómez	31	53	58.5

3 Point Field Goals
#	Player	3PM	3PA	3P%
1	(Dominican Republic) Andrés Feliz	15	23	65.2
2	(Brazil) Tim Soares	9	15	60.0
3	(Canada) Dillon Brooks	20	34	58.8
3	(Slovenia) Mike Tobey	10	17	58.8
5	(South Sudan) Peter Jok	14	24	58.3
6	(Japan) Makoto Hiejima	8	14	57.1
7	(Lebanon) Karim Zeinoun	9	16	56.3
8	(United States) Mikal Bridges	15	27	55.6
8	(Latvia) Andrejs Gražulis	10	18	55.6
10	(Lithuania) Rokas Jokubaitis	11	20	55.0

Free Throws
#	Player	FTM	FTA	FT%
1	(Ivory Coast) Bazoumana Koné	13	13	100.0
2	(United States) Austin Reaves	37	39	94.9
3	(Montenegro) Nikola Vučević	17	18	94.4
4	(Iran) Hamed Haddadi	16	17	94.1
5	(Spain) Santi Aldama	15	16	93.8
6	(Dominican Republic) Karl-Anthony Towns	39	42	92.9
7	(New Zealand) Shea Ili	25	27	92.6
7	(Canada) Kelly Olynyk	25	27	92.6
9	(Finland) Lauri Markkanen	34	38	89.5
10	(Japan) Josh Hawkinson	40	45	88.9
10	(Puerto Rico) Tremont Waters	16	18	88.9

Double-Doubles
#	Player	Pld	DblDbl	DD%
1	(Serbia) Nikola Milutinov	8	4	50.0
2	(Canada) Shai Gilgeous-Alexander	8	3	37.5
2	(South Sudan) Carlik Jones	5	3	60.0
2	(Dominican Republic) Karl-Anthony Towns	5	3	60.0
2	(Lithuania) Jonas Valančiūnas	8	3	37.5
6	(Georgia (country)) Goga Bitadze	5	2	40.0
6	(Brazil) Bruno Caboclo	5	2	40.0
6	(Slovenia) Luka Dončić	8	2	25.0
6	(Jordan) Ahmad Dwairi	5	2	40.0
6	(South Sudan) Wenyen Gabriel	5	2	40.0
6	(New Zealand) Shea Ili	5	2	40.0
6	(Mexico) Fabián Jaimes	5	2	40.0
6	(Egypt) Assem Marei	5	2	40.0
6	(Puerto Rico) Ismael Romero	5	2	40.0
6	(Cape Verde) Edy Tavares	5	2	40.0
6	(Montenegro) Nikola Vučević	5	2	40.0
6	(Puerto Rico) Tremont Waters	5	2	40.0

Efficiency
#	Player	Pld	MPG	PPG	Eff	EffPG
1	(Canada) Shai Gilgeous-Alexander	8	32.1	24.5	243	30.4
2	(Japan) Josh Hawkinson	5	34.9	21.0	143	28.6
3	(Slovenia) Luka Dončić	8	32.1	27.0	208	26.0
3	(South Sudan) Carlik Jones	5	30.3	20.4	130	26.0
5	(Finland) Lauri Markkanen	5	26.7	24.8	120	24.0
5	(Montenegro) Nikola Vučević	5	26.7	19.8	120	24.0
7	(Dominican Republic) Karl-Anthony Towns	5	29.6	24.4	115	23.0
8	(Jordan) Rondae Hollis-Jefferson	5	38.6	23.6	113	22.6
9	(Brazil) Bruno Caboclo	5	28.1	16.4	110	22.0
9	(Dominican Republic) Andrés Feliz	5	27.3	16.0	110	22.0

=== Team tournament averages ===
Points
#	Team	Pld	Pts	PPG
1	United States	8	836	104.5
2	Canada	8	790	98.8
3	Serbia	8	761	95.1
4	Australia	5	469	93.8
5	Germany	8	744	93.0
6	South Sudan	5	456	91.2
7	Latvia	8	714	89.3
8	Lithuania	8	713	89.1
9	Puerto Rico	5	444	88.8
10	Slovenia	8	704	88.0

Rebounds
#	Team	Pld	Rebs	RPG
1	Angola	5	212	42.4
2	Philippines	5	207	41.4
3	Brazil	5	202	40.4
4	Lithuania	8	318	39.8
5	United States	8	317	39.6
6	Egypt	5	196	39.2
7	Montenegro	5	193	38.6
7	Spain	5	193	38.6
9	Georgia	5	192	38.4
9	Puerto Rico	5	192	38.4

Assists
#	Team	Pld	Asts	APG
1	Spain	5	139	27.8
2	Finland	5	123	24.6
3	Latvia	8	195	24.4
4	United States	8	191	23.9
5	Serbia	8	189	23.6
6	Australia	5	116	23.2
7	South Sudan	5	113	22.6
8	Germany	8	180	22.5
9	Canada	8	178	22.3
10	Mexico	5	111	22.2

Steals
#	Team	Pld	Stls	SPG
1	Ivory Coast	5	50	10.0
2	Serbia	8	73	9.1
3	United States	8	72	9.0
3	Montenegro	5	45	9.0
5	Egypt	5	43	8.6
6	Jordan	5	42	8.4
7	Angola	5	41	8.2
8	Germany	8	65	8.1
9	France	5	40	8.0
10	Puerto Rico	5	39	7.8

Blocks
#	Team	Pld	Blks	BPG
1	United States	8	43	5.4
2	France	5	24	4.8
3	South Sudan	5	22	4.4
4	Philippines	5	21	4.2
5	Australia	5	19	3.8
5	Egypt	5	19	3.8
5	Spain	5	19	3.8
8	Lithuania	8	30	3.8
9	Finland	5	17	3.4
9	Japan	5	17	3.4

Field Goal Shooting
#	Team	Pld	FGM/A	FG%
1	Serbia	8	270/498	54.2
2	United States	8	294/549	53.6
3	Latvia	8	264/513	51.5
4	Germany	8	268/524	51.1
5	Australia	5	175/344	50.9
6	Lithuania	8	262/516	50.8
7	Canada	8	269/538	50.0
8	France	5	146/293	49.8
9	Spain	5	151/308	49.0
10	South Sudan	5	157/329	47.7

3 Point Field Goals
#	Team	Pld	3PT/A	3PT%
1	Lithuania	8	86/204	42.2
2	Latvia	8	110/261	42.1
3	South Sudan	5	59/145	40.7
4	Canada	8	102/253	40.3
5	United States	8	82/205	40.0
6	New Zealand	5	57/144	39.6
7	Lebanon	5	46/118	39.0
8	Puerto Rico	5	58/152	38.2
9	Germany	8	91/239	38.1
10	Mexico	5	45/119	37.8

Free Throws
#	Team	Pld	FTM/A	FT%
1	Ivory Coast	5	72/83	86.7
2	Brazil	5	85/102	83.3
3	Finland	5	64/77	83.1
4	Japan	5	79/98	80.6
5	Georgia	5	80/100	80.0
6	Italy	8	103/129	79.8
7	United States	8	166/209	79.4
8	Germany	8	117/148	79.1
9	Serbia	8	141/180	78.3
10	Australia	5	72/92	78.3

=== Player game highs ===
Category	Player	Team	Opponent	Total
Points	Dillon Brooks	Canada	United States	39
Points	Rondae Hollis-Jefferson	Jordan	New Zealand	39
Points	Karl-Anthony Towns	Dominican Republic	Puerto Rico	39
Rebounds	Josh Hawkinson	Japan	Finland	19
Assists	Artūrs Žagars	Latvia	Lithuania	17
Steals	Nicolò Melli	Italy	Slovenia	5
Steals	Stephen Thompson Jr.	Puerto Rico	South Sudan	5
Steals	Raul Neto	Brazil	Iran	5
Blocks	Wenyen Gabriel	South Sudan	Angola	6
Efficiency	Josh Hawkinson	Japan	Finland	44

=== Team game highs ===
Category	Team	Opponent	Total
Points	Canada	Lebanon	128
Rebounds	United States	Jordan	56
Assists	Canada	Lebanon	44
Steals	Montenegro	Egypt	15
Blocks	South Sudan	Angola	9
Difference	Canada	Lebanon	55

== Marketing ==
=== Logos ===
The official logo for the FIBA Basketball World Cup 2023 was unveiled on 4 December 2020. The logo's concept consist of three main elements. The heart symbolizes the passion for the game, the Naismith Trophy represents the prize given to the winner of the World Cup, and the "23" represents the year of the World Cup. The logo for the 2023 FIBA Basketball World Cup has already been agreed upon as early as July 2019 and only needed to be approved by FIBA as of that time. On 28 November 2020, FIBA launched the Don't Miss A Beat campaign leading up to the logo launch. As part of the campaign, VMLY&R created three music beats for the logo launch, inspired from the local music of the hosting countries.

There are also host city logos for Manila, Jakarta, and Okinawa. The Manila logo features a Jeepney, the most popular mean of transportation in the Philippines. Logos for Jakarta and Okinawa feature several landmarks – the Shuri Castle in Shuri, Okinawa and the Monas, the national monument of Indonesia, located in Jakarta.

=== Slogan ===
On 31 August 2021, during the qualifiers draw, FIBA released the slogan for the World Cup, "Win For All".

=== Mascot ===
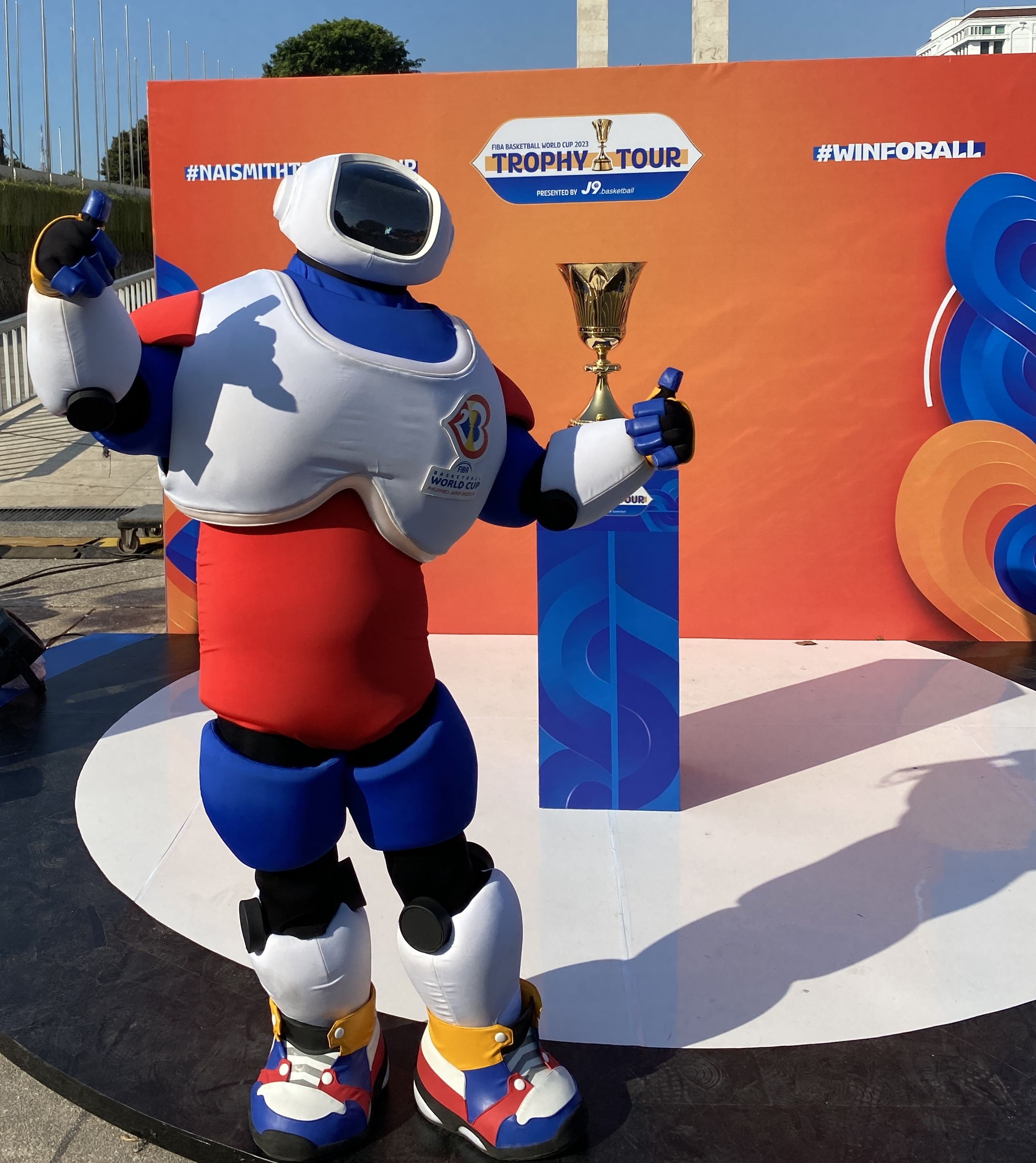
JIP at the FIBA World Cup Trophy Tour in Jakarta.

On 9 June 2022, FIBA unveiled the official mascot for the FIBA Basketball World Cup 2023. According to its fictional biography, the mascot, initially unnamed, was created through the idea of three fans from the three host countries (Philippines, Japan, and Indonesia), to create "something amazing that could unite people and represent them all." The mascot is a basketball robot with an LED face which allows it to connect and interact with people through its various expressions. In addition, the mascot also has a basketball hoop attached to its back as an advocacy for the importance of recycling. The red, blue, and yellow colors of the mascot represent the three colors of the national flags of the host nations. An online naming competition was held, and on 28 July 2022, it was announced the mascot's name is "JIP," which is the first letter of each of the three host countries – the Philippines, Japan, and Indonesia.

=== Ball ===
The official ball used for the World Cup was unveiled on 29 April 2023 during the Draw Festival at the Bonifacio Global City in Taguig. Similar to 2019, the Molten BG5000 was used for the tournament but with a design inspired by wave and gold elements and hearts. Nicknamed "The Passion Wave", it represents a heartbeat birthed out of passion for basketball that reverberates throughout the world. Another version of the ball, intended to be used in the final was also unveiled. This version had the tournament logo, the Naismith Trophy image in gold, the date of the final, and a unique serial number.

=== Trophy tour ===
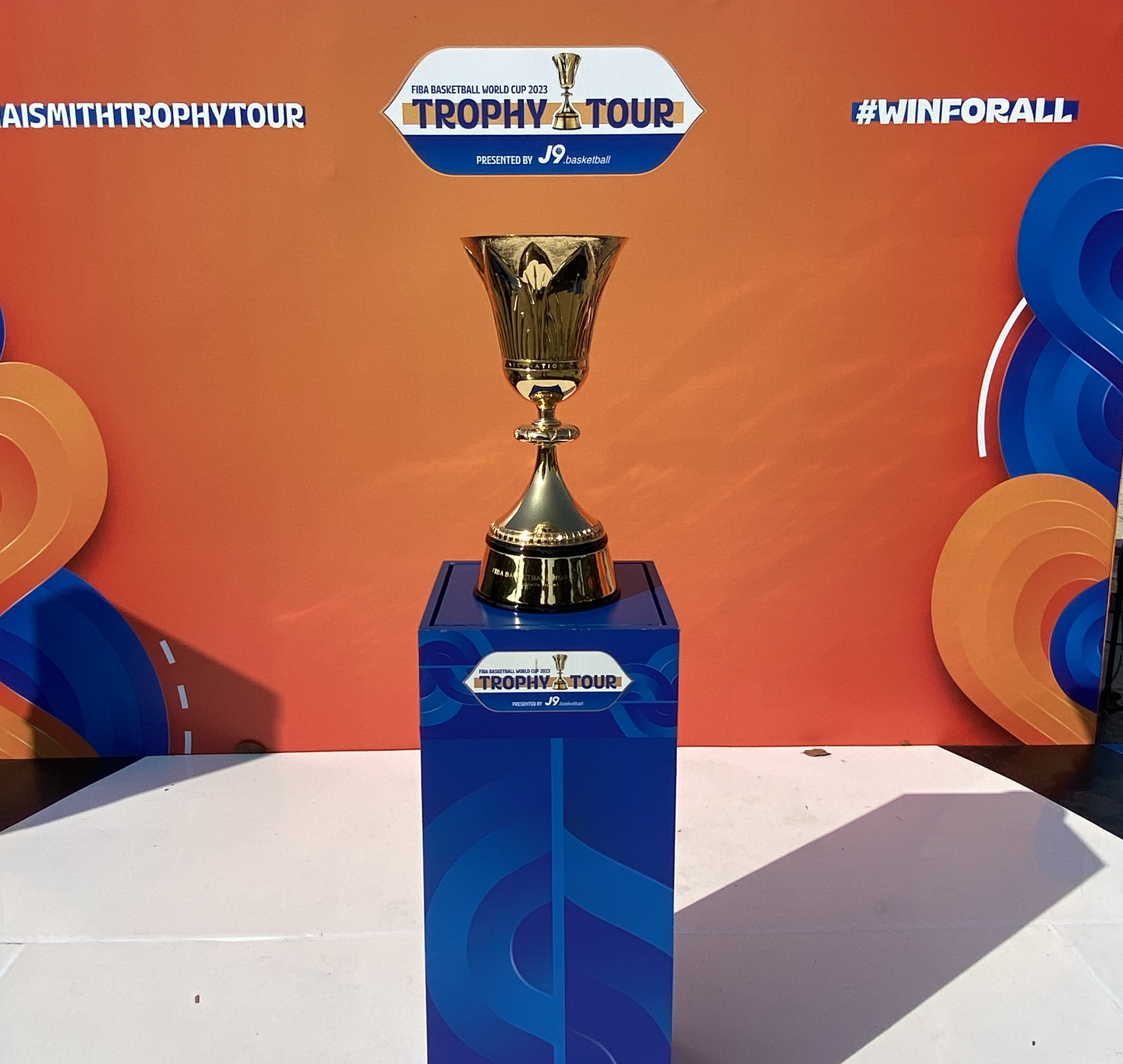
The Naismith Trophy during a tour of Jakarta in August 2023

Several months before the start of the tournament, the Naismith Trophy began a journey through the 30 participating countries and the 3 host countries. The trophy tour was launched at the Bonifacio Global City in Taguig, Metro Manila, Philippines during the week of the World Cup draw. Prior to the launch, the trophy made rounds across several media outlets before visiting the Fort Bonifacio Tenement in Taguig a day after the draw. The following day, on 1 May 2023, it made its first international stop in Beijing, China, with the tour set to conclude on 24 August 2023, a day before the start of the tournament.

Trophy tour stops and dates

- Metro Manila, Philippines (26–30 April)
- China (1–4 May)
  - Beijing (1 & 3–4 May)
  - Shanghai/Suzhou (2 May)
  - Nanjing (3 May)
- Lebanon (5–7 May)
  - Beirut (5 & 7 May)
    - Hazmieh (7 May)
  - Batroun/Adma (5 May)
  - Zahlé/Dbayeh (6 May)
  - Sidon (7 May)
- Auckland, New Zealand (9–10 May)
  - Māngere East (10 May)
- Iran (12–14 May)
  - Tehran (12–13 May)
  - Isfahan (14 May)
- Ivory Coast (14–16 May)
  - Yamoussoukro (14 May)
  - Abidjan (15–16 May)
- Cape Verde (17–19 May)
  - Ribeira Bote, Mindelo (17 May)
  - Praia (19 May)
- Egypt (20–21 May)
  - Alexandria (20 May)
  - Giza/Gezira, Cairo (21 May)
- Luanda, Angola (22–24 May)
- São Paulo, Brazil (25–26 May)
- Juba, South Sudan (29–30 May)
- Lithuania (2–3 June)
  - Vilnius/Trakai (2 June)
  - Kaunas (3 June)
- Montenegro (6–7 June)
  - Rijeka Crnojevića/Boka/
    Sveti Stefan/Cetinje (6 June)
  - Podgorica (7 June)
- Serbia (9–10 June)
  - Belgrade (9 June)
  - Stari Banovci (10 June)
- Helsinki, Finland (11 June)
- Italy (11–13 June)
  - Milan (11–12 June)
  - Bologna (13 June)
- Jordan (15–16 June)
  - Jerash/Umm Qais/Amman (15 June)
  - Petra (16 June)
- Berlin, Germany (17–18 June)
- Georgia (22–24 June)
  - Tbilisi (22–24 June)
  - Mtskheta/Tsalka (Note: The trophy went to the Tsalka Canyon, which is near the city of Tsalka.) (24 June)
- Slovenia (25–27 June)
  - Ljubljana (25–27 June)
  - Bled (26 June)
  - Postojna (27 June)
- Paris, France (28 June)
- Latvia (29–30 June)
  - Riga (29–30 June)
  - Sigulda (30 June)
    - Turaida (30 June)
  - Saulkrasti (30 June)
- Puerto Rico (30 June – 2 July)
  - Guaynabo (30 June – 1 July)
  - San Juan (1–2 July)
- Caracas, Venezuela (3–5 July)
- Mexico City, Mexico (7–8 July)
- Santo Domingo,
  Dominican Republic (9 July)
- Las Vegas, United States (10–11 July)
- Toronto, Canada (13–14 July)
- Japan (15–27 July)
  - Sapporo (15 July)
  - Sendai (17 July)
  - Niigata (18 July)
  - Toyama/Fukui (19 July)
  - Aichi (20 July)
  - Osaka (21 July)
  - Tokyo (22–23 July)
  - Kagawa (24 July)
  - Hiroshima (25 July)
  - Fukuoka (26 July)
  - Nakagami, Okinawa (27 July)
- Indonesia (29 July – 6 August)
  - Surakarta (29–30 July)
  - Bali (31 July – 1 August)
  - Surabaya (2–3 August)
  - Jakarta (4–6 August)
- Greece (9–10 August)
- Málaga, Spain (10–11 August)
- Melbourne, Australia (13–14 August)
- Philippines
  - Cebu (15 August)
  - Davao City (16–18 August)
  - Greater Manila Area (19–20 August)
    - Bocaue
    - Pasay
    - Quezon City
  - Ilocos Norte (21–23 August)
    - Burgos
    - Paoay

=== Ambassadors ===
Former Argentina national team player and two-time FIBA Basketball World Cup silver medalist Luis Scola was named a Global Ambassador for the tournament on 14 December 2022.

Two-time NBA champion and 2006 World Cup winner Pau Gasol joined Scola as one of the tournament's Global Ambassadors on 6 February 2023. Gasol served as an Ambassador for the 2022 FIBA Women's Basketball World Cup in Australia months prior. Ten-time NBA All-Star and three-time Olympic Gold Medalist Carmelo Anthony was also named a Global Ambassador on 24 February 2023.

In August 2022, Indonesian actor Raffi Ahmad and Miss Universe 2018 Catriona Gray were announced as local ambassadors for the tournament in Indonesia and the Philippines, respectively. Former Philippine national team members LA Tenorio, Jeff Chan, Larry Fonacier, and Gary David were also named local ambassadors. The Japanese B.League was named a local ambassador for the tournament in Japan on 22 September 2022. Former Japanese national team player and current Levanga Hokkaido president Takehiko Orimo was announced as a local ambassador in the weeks leading up to the World Cup draw. German-Indonesian actress Cinta Laura was also named a local ambassador for Indonesia on 11 July 2023.

=== Ticketing ===
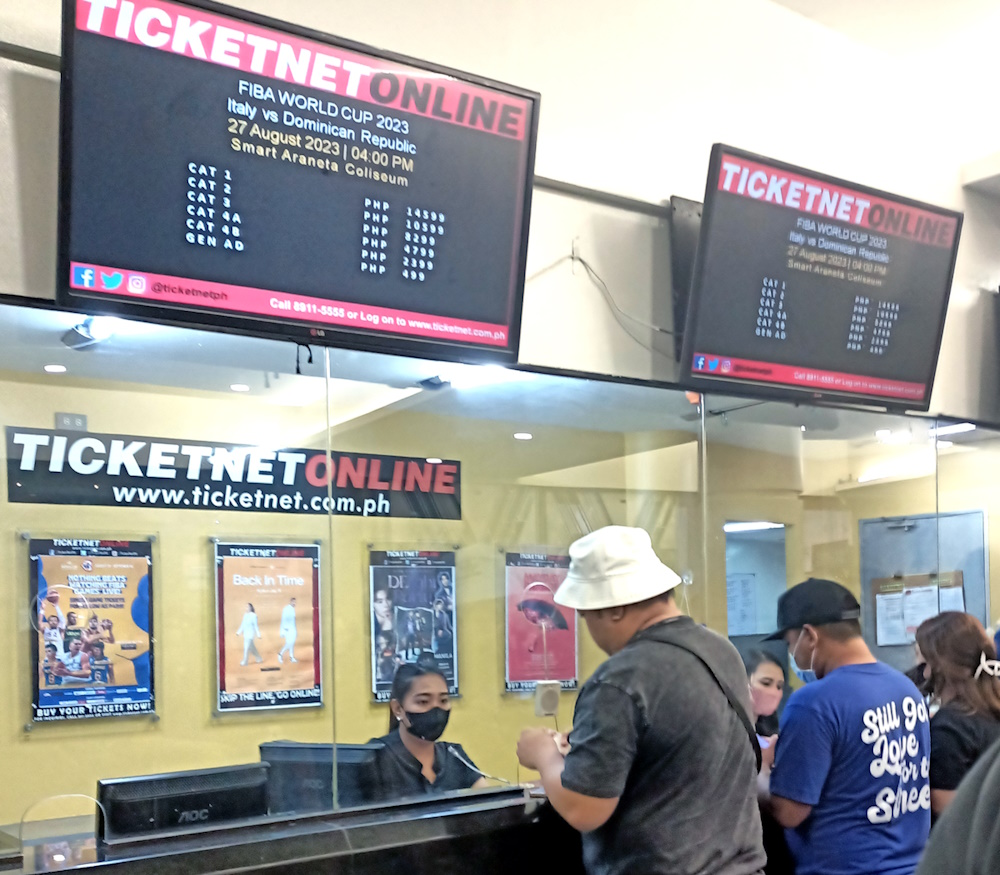
Ticket counter at the Araneta Coliseum in Quezon City.

Pricing for the 2023 FIBA Basketball World Cup game tickets were determined by the local organizing committees and was reviewed by FIBA.

Ticket packages or 'passes' covering multiple games were made available as early as March 2022. Single tickets were made available for purchase in July 2023.

In Okinawa specifically, the target ticket sales of ¥1 billion ($6.8 million) set by the Japanese local organizing committee has been met.

On the last day of the tournament, FIBA concluded that attendance was lower than expected citing high ticket pricing, especially the middle tiers.

=== Countdown clocks ===
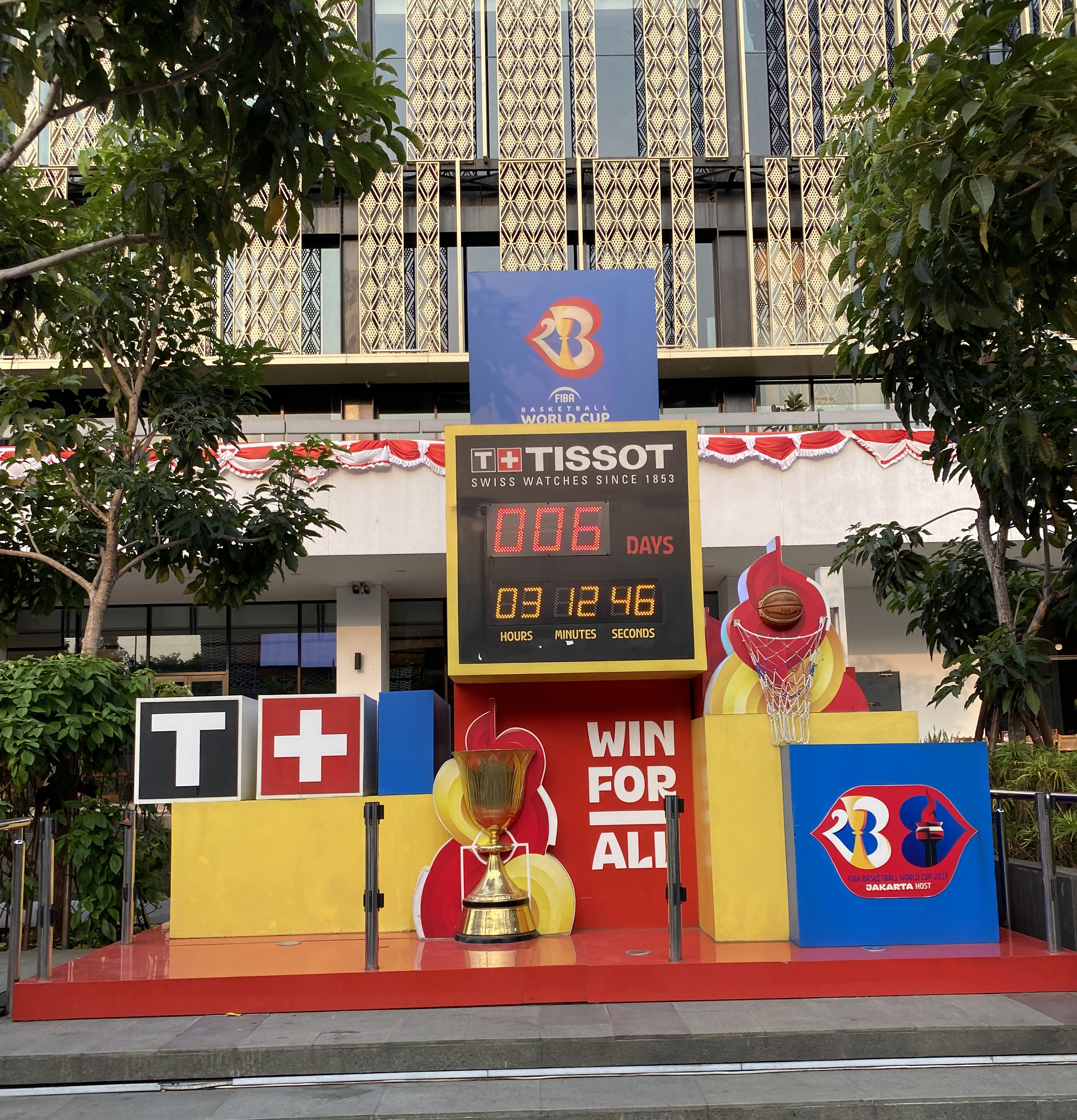
Countdown clock for 2023 FIBA World Cup in front of Sarinah, Jakarta.

Three countdown clocks were unveiled from 25 to 28 August 2022 to mark one year before the tournament. These clocks are situated at the Tenbusu Naha Plaza in Naha, Okinawa; the Selamat Datang Monument in Jakarta; and the SM Mall of Asia in Pasay. The countdown clock in Indonesia was later moved to the front of Sarinah Department Store after the unveiling ceremony.

== Sponsorship ==
FIBA Global Partners	Indonesian Sponsors	Japanese Sponsors	Philippine Sponsors	Global Suppliers	Global Master Licensee
Ganten; J9.com; Molten; Nike; Smart Communications; TCL Corporation; Tencent; Tissot; Wanda Group; Yili Group	Bank Mandiri; Gojek; Pertamina; Perusahaan Listrik Negara; Bukit Asam Enterprises; Kahf	SoftBank Group; Nippon Life; Orion Breweries; TOKIO Inkarami; Ena School; Oriental Bio; Timee; PCA	Toyota Motor Philippines; San Miguel Corporation; Unilab/Alaxan; PepsiCo (Lay's, Gatorade); ArenaPlus; Cignal; Banco de Oro; Dunkin' Philippines; Jollibee; Unilever (Rexona)	Hyperice; Junckers; Schelde Sports; TicketSocket; Unilumin Sports	IMG

== Issues ==
=== Traffic in Manila ===
It was anticipated that heavy traffic in Metro Manila would impact the conduct of games in the Philippines. As part of the preparations, the Philippine local organizing committee had conducted simulations on transporting players from their hotels to the playing venues. The Metropolitan Manila Development Authority has also traffic scheme for the duration of the tournament.

The Philippine Arena would be stripped off of its role as the final round venue due to "serious traffic and transport concerns". In addition the accessibility of the venue in Bulacan adjacent to Metro Manila, has been a longtime issue. Unlike the two other venues in Greater Manila, the Philippine Arena is not accessible by public transport.

=== Attendance in Okinawa ===
Blocks of seat were left vacant for the opening game of the Japanese national team against Germany at the 8,500-seater Okinawa Arena. Players from Japan made a complaint, which prompted intervention by FIBA. FIBA resold unused corporate tickets for Okinawa games to the general public for subsequent games, which boosted attendance, including games not involving Japan.

=== New Zealand game court storming ===
The New Zealand vs United States game at the Mall of Asia Arena in Pasay on 26 August 2023 had a court storming incident. Prior to the start of the game, a ticket-paying fan wearing full New Zealand jersey stormed the court. He was stopped after the New Zealand bench informed the organizers that the fan is not part of their squad.

=== Serbian player kidney injury ===
Serbian player Boriša Simanić was rendered injured after he was elbowed by Nuni Omot of South Sudan with two minutes left in the game. Simanić underwent a surgery at the Makati Medical Center. However, due to complications, he had to undergo a second operation to remove one of his kidneys. He also had to receive a blood transfusion.

=== Filipino senators' shirt statement ===
Senators Joel Villanueva, Migz Zubiri, Bato dela Rosa, and Bong Go attended live the Philippines' final classification match against China with shirts with the "West PH Sea" and the Philippine flag as a show of support to the Philippine claim in the South China Sea disputes. Online critics described the stunt as "performative". Senator Francis Tolentino defended his colleagues insisting that there is nothing wrong to "express personal political beliefs" even in a FIBA game.

== See also ==
- 2022 FIBA Women's Basketball World Cup
