= Fabián Jaimes =

Mexican basketball player (born 1992)

No. 3 – Fuerza Regia de Monterrey
- Position: Power forward
- League: LNBP

Personal information
- Born: 22 September 1992 (age 34) Ciudad Nezahualcóyotl, State of Mexico, Mexico
- Listed height: 6 ft 6 in (1.98 m)
- Listed weight: 220 lb (100 kg)

Career information
- College: Universidad de las Américas Puebla
- Playing career: 2015–present

Career history
- 2015–2017: Panteras de Aguascalientes
- 2016–2019: Tijuana Zonkeys
- 2017–2018: Fuerza Regia de Monterrey
- 2018–2021: Panteras de Aguascalientes
- 2021: Soles de Ojinaga
- 2021–2022: Mexico City Capitanes
- 2022: Tijuana Zonkeys
- 2022–2023: Asociación Deportiva Atenas
- 2022: Astros de Jalisco
- 2023–2024: Panteras de Aguascalientes
- 2024: Halcones de Xalapa
- 2024: Titanes de Barranquilla
- 2025–present: Dorados de Chihuahua
- 2025–present: Tijuana Zonkeys
- 2025: Soles de Mexicali
- 2026–present: Fuerza Regia de Monterrey

Fabián Misael Jaimes Nava (born 22 September 1992) is a Mexican professional basketball player for the Dorados de Chihuahua of the LBE, and the Mexican national team.

== Career ==
Fabián made his debut in the 2015–16 season with the Tijuana Zonkeys to play in the CIBACOPA and would also do so in the 2017–18, 2018–19, and 2022 seasons. The Mexican power forward would also play in the Liga Nacional de Baloncesto Profesional, specifically for six seasons, five of them (2015–16, 2016–17, 2018–19, 2019–20, and 2020–21) with the Panteras de Aguascalientes, except for a brief period during the 2017–18 season when he played for Fuerza Regia de Monterrey, with which he also participated in the Liga de las Américas. On October 27, 2021, he signed with the Mexico City Capitanes of the NBA G League. On March 4, 2022, he was confirmed as a reinforcement for Asociación Deportiva Atenas in the Liga Nacional de Básquet. On December 20, 2024, he was announced as a reinforcement for the Dorados de Chihuahua of the LBE for the 2025 season.

== National team career ==
In August and September 2023, he was a member of the Mexican national team that participated in the 2023 FIBA World Cup held in Asia, finishing in 25th place.
