= 2023 FIBA Basketball World Cup Group F =

Group F was one of eight groups of the preliminary round of the 2023 FIBA Basketball World Cup. It took place from 26 to 30 August 2023, and consisted of Cape Verde, Georgia, Slovenia, and Venezuela. Each team played each other once, for a total of three games per team, with all games played at the Okinawa Arena, Okinawa City, Japan. The top two teams advanced to the second round and the bottom two teams qualified for the classification rounds.

== Teams ==
Team	Qualification		Appearance			Best performance	WR
Team	As	Date	Last	Total	Streak	Best performance	WR
Slovenia	European Group J top three	14 November 2022	2014	4	1	7th place (2014)	7
Cape Verde	African best third placed team	26 February 2023	—	1	1	Debut	66
Georgia	European Group L top three	26 February 2023	—	1	1	Debut	32
Venezuela	Americas Group E top three	26 February 2023	2019	5	2	11th place (1990)	17

== Standings ==
Pos	Team	Pld	W	L	PF	PA	PD	Pts	Qualification
1	Slovenia	3	3	0	280	229	+51	6	Second round
2	Georgia	3	2	1	222	207	+15	5	Second round
3	Cape Verde	3	1	2	218	252	−34	4	17th–32nd classification
4	Venezuela	3	0	3	219	251	−32	3	17th–32nd classification

Source: FIBA
Rules for classification: Tiebreakers

== Games ==
All times are local (UTC+9).

=== Cape Verde vs. Georgia ===
This was the first competitive game between Cape Verde and Georgia.

26 August 2023
17:00

Boxscore

Cape Verde	60–85	Georgia
Scoring by quarter: 11–20, 11–28, 15–22, 23–15
Pts: Mendes 11; Rebs: E. Tavares 12; Asts: Da Rosa 6		Pts: Shengelia 16; Rebs: Bitadze 11; Asts: Andronikashvili 6

Okinawa Arena, Okinawa City
Attendance: 5,669
Referees: Jorge Vázquez (PUR), Martin Horozov (BUL), Wael Mostafa (EGY)

=== Slovenia vs. Venezuela ===
This was the first game between Slovenia and Venezuela in the World Cup. The Slovenians won in the semi-finals of the 2020 FIBA Men's Olympic Qualifying Tournament in Kaunas, which was the last competitive game between the two teams.

26 August 2023
20:30

Boxscore

Slovenia	100–85	Venezuela
Scoring by quarter: 31–33, 25–18, 22–12, 22–22
Pts: Dončić 37; Rebs: Dončić 7 Asts: Dončić 6		Pts: Sojo 16; Rebs: Carrera, Colmenares 4 Asts: Guillent 6

Okinawa Arena, Okinawa City
Attendance: 6,389
Referees: Ademir Zurapović (BIH), Matthew Kallio (CAN), Wojciech Liszka (POL)

=== Venezuela vs. Cape Verde ===
This was the first competitive game between Venezuela and Cape Verde.

28 August 2023
17:00

Boxscore

Venezuela	75–81	Cape Verde
Scoring by quarter: 23–24, 23–9, 20–26, 9–22
Pts: Cubillán 15; Rebs: Sojo 7 Asts: Cubillán 4		Pts: Betinho 22; Rebs: E. Tavares 14; Asts: E. Tavares, W. Tavares 3

Okinawa Arena, Okinawa City
Attendance: 5,841
Referees: Ademir Zurapović (BIH), Wojciech Liszka (POL), Ahmed Al-Shuwaili (IRQ)

=== Georgia vs. Slovenia ===
This was the first game between Georgia and Slovenia in the World Cup. The Slovenians won the last two meetings in EuroBasket 2013 and EuroBasket 2015, respectively.

28 August 2023
20:30

Boxscore

Georgia	67–88	Slovenia
Scoring by quarter: 17–16, 16–29, 17–18, 17–25
Pts: Mamukelashvili 21; Rebs: Mamukelashvili 7 Asts: Tsintsadze 7		Pts: Dončić 34; Rebs: Dončić 10; Asts: Dončić 6

Okinawa Arena, Okinawa City
Attendance: 6,042
Referees: Jorge Vázquez (PUR), Omar Bermúdez (MEX), Blanca Burns (USA)

=== Georgia vs. Venezuela ===
This was the first competitive game between Georgia and Venezuela.

30 August 2023
17:00

Boxscore

Georgia	70–59	Venezuela
Scoring by quarter: 24–19, 18–4, 17–21, 11–15
Pts: Shengelia 25; Rebs: Bitadze 11; Asts: Sanadze, Shengelia 3		Pts: Colmenares 16; Rebs: Colmenares 12; Asts: Guillent 7

Okinawa Arena, Okinawa City
Attendance: 5,807
Referees: Matthew Kallio (CAN), Amy Bonner (USA), Wojciech Liszka (POL)

=== Slovenia vs. Cape Verde ===
This was the first competitive game between Slovenia and Cape Verde.

30 August 2023
20:30

Boxscore

Slovenia	92–77	Cape Verde
Scoring by quarter: 24–21, 21–17, 24–17, 23–22
Pts: Dončić 19; Rebs: Dončić 7 Asts: Dončić 9		Pts: Betinho 17; Rebs: E. Tavares 10; Asts: E. Tavares 5

Okinawa Arena, Okinawa City
Attendance: 5,145
Referees: Ademir Zurapović (BIH), Omar Bermúdez (MEX), Waseem Husainy (CAN)
