= Mohammad Amini =

Iranian basketball player

No. 6 – SLUC Nancy Basket
- Position: Shooting guard
- League: LNB Élite

Personal information
- Born: April 26, 2005 (age 21) Bandar Abbas, Iran
- Listed height: 2.01 m (6 ft 7 in)
- Listed weight: 90 kg (198 lb)

Career information
- NBA draft: 2026: undrafted
- Playing career: 2020–present

Career history
- 2020–2022: Mahram Tehran BC
- 2022–2024: AS Monaco
- 2024–present: SLUC Nancy Basket

Career highlights
- FIBA U18 Asian Championship All-Star Selection (2022); French League champion (2024)
Medals
Men's basketball
Representing Iran
FIBA Asia Cup
Bronze medal – third place	2025 Jeddah

Mohammad "Mo" Amini (born April 26, 2005) is an Iranian professional basketball player for the SLUC Nancy Basket of the LNB Élite.

== Early life ==
Amini was born on April 26, 2005, in Iran.

== Professional career ==
From 2022 to 2024, Amini played for AS Monaco in the LNB Pro A and LNB Elite in France.

In 2024, Amini joined SLUC Nancy Basket in LNB Elite. He appeared in 30 games for Nancy in the 2024–25 season, averaging 6.3 points, 2.7 rebounds, and 1.1 assists per game. In the 2025–26 season he appeared in 27 games averaging 7.8 points, 4.1 rebounds, and 1.8 assists per game.

Amini was an entrant in the 2026 NBA draft but went undrafted.

In July 2026, it was announced that Amini would be joining the Boston Celtics for 2026 NBA Summer League in Las Vegas.

In October 2026, Amini scored a career high 25 points against Dijon Basket.

== National team career ==
Amini represented Iran in the 2023 FIBA World Cup, averaging 13.2 points, 4.6 rebounds, and 1.4 assists per game.

In 2025, Amini represented Iran at the 2025 FIBA Asia Cup in Saudi Arabia where Iran finished with a 5–1 record and was third place, earning the bronze medal. Amini averaged 14.6 points per game.

In August 2026, Amini returned to the Iranian national team for the 2027 FIBA World Cup Asia qualifiers.

== Career statistics ==
=== LNB Elite ===
Year	Team	GP	MPG	FG%	3P%	FT%	RPG	APG	SPG	BPG	PPG
2022-23	AS Monaco Basket	1	37.0	.571	.500	.500	4.0	0.0	0.0	0.0	12.0
2023-24	AS Monaco Basket	5	9.4	.467	.429	.667	2.6	0.4	0.0	0.0	4.6
2024-25	SLUC Nancy Basket	30	16.7	.579	.313	.585	2.7	1.1	0.8	0.2	6.3
2025-26	SLUC Nancy Basket	27	22.6	.500	.257	.625	4.1	1.8	0.8	0.2	7.8
2026-27	SLUC Nancy Basket	5	29.2	.455	.438	.714	4.8	2.4	1.0	0.4	10.8
Career		68	19.7	.528	.310	.620	3.5	1.4	0.7	0.2	7.2

=== FIBA ===
Year	Team	Event	GP	PPG	RPG	APG
2023	Iran	2023 FIBA Basketball World Cup	5	13.2	4.6	1.4
2025	Iran	2025 FIBA Asia Cup qualification	5	15.8	6.2	1.4
2025	Iran	2025 FIBA Asia Cup	5	14.6	5.8	1.8
2027	Iran	2027 FIBA World Cup Asia qualification	2	11.5	6.0	2.5
Career						
