= Canada men's national basketball team results (2020–present) =

This article provides details of international basketball games played by the Canada men's national basketball team from 2020 to present.

== Results ==
Key
| Win |
| Draw |
| Defeat |

=== 2020 ===
| February 21 2022 FIBA AmeriCup qualifiers | Canada | 89–72 | Dominican Republic | Oshawa, Canada |
| 19:05 UTC−5 | Scoring by quarter: 17–22, 18–18, 30–18, 24–14 |
| | Pts: Nicholson 16; Rebs: Nicholson 7 Asts: Kajami-Keane 8 | Boxscore | Pts: Liz 16; Rebs: Delgado 8 Asts: Solano 6 | Arena: Campus Recreation and Wellness Centre; Referees: Leandro Lezcano (ARG), Julio Anaya (PAN), Alexis Mercado (PUR) |

| February 24 2022 FIBA AmeriCup qualifiers | Dominican Republic | 88–84(OT) | Canada | Santo Domingo, Dominican Republic |
| 20:00 UTC−4 | Scoring by quarter: 22–16, 17–17, 11–19, 25–23, Overtime: 13–9 |
| | Pts: Vargas 16; Rebs: Solano 6 Asts: Solano 8 | Boxscore | Pts: P. Scrubb 26; Rebs: Klassen 9 Asts: Kajami-Keane 7 | Arena: Palacio de los Deportes; Attendance: 1,500; Referees: Juan Fernández (ARG), Andreia Silva (BRA), Christian Wilmore (BAH) |

=== 2021 ===
| February 17 2022 FIBA AmeriCup qualifiers | Virgin Islands | 93–95 | Canada | San Juan, Puerto Rico |
| 20:00 UTC−4 | Scoring by quarter: 20–28, 26–19, 23–27, 24–21 |
| | Pts: Hodge 28; Rebs: Aska, Smith 8 Asts: Hodge 7 | Boxscore | Pts: Best 28; Rebs: Bennett, Klassen 8 Asts: Kajami-Keane 9 | Arena: Roberto Clemente Coliseum; Referees: Jorge Vázquez (PUR), Carlos Peralta (ECU), Christian Wilmore (BAH) |

| February 20 2022 FIBA AmeriCup qualifiers | Canada | 95–90 | Virgin Islands | San Juan, Puerto Rico |
| 14:30 UTC−4 | Scoring by quarter: 20–18, 23–17, 25–29, 27–26 |
| | Pts: Kajami-Keane 27; Rebs: T. Scrubb 11; Asts: Kajami-Keane 9 | Boxscore | Pts: Hodge 44; Rebs: Aska 8 Asts: Edwin 4 | Arena: Roberto Clemente Coliseum; Referees: Jorge Vázquez (PUR), Grant Todey (USA), Juan Fernández (ARG) |

| June 29 2020 Olympic Qualifying Tournament – Group stage | Greece | 91–97 | Canada | Victoria, Canada |
| 16:05 UTC−7 | Scoring by quarter: 23–19, 27–27, 21–28, 20–23 |
| | Pts: Mitoglou 14; Rebs: Mitoglou 10; Asts: Calathes 9 | Boxscore | Pts: Wiggins 23; Rebs: Powell 7 Asts: Joseph 6 | Arena: Save-On-Foods Memorial Centre; Referees: Antonio Conde (ESP), Steven Anderson (USA), Luis Castillo (ESP) |

| June 30 2020 Olympic Qualifying Tournament – Group stage | Canada | 109–79 | China | Victoria, Canada |
| 16:05 UTC−7 | Scoring by quarter: 27–19, 32–27, 20–19, 30–14 |
| | Pts: Wiggins 20; Rebs: Powell 9 Asts: Joseph 7 | Boxscore | Pts: Hu 24; Rebs: Shen 8 Asts: Zhao 5 | Arena: Save-On-Foods Memorial Centre; Referees: Aleksandar Glišić (SRB), Leandro Lezcano (ARG), Luis Castillo (ESP) |

| July 3 2020 Olympic Qualifying Tournament – Semi-finals | Canada | 101–103(OT) | Czech Republic | Victoria, Canada |
| 13:05 UTC−7 | Scoring by quarter: 27–29, 17–23, 16–15, 34–27, Overtime: 7–9 |
| | Pts: Barrett 23; Rebs: Lyles 11; Asts: Barrett 6 | Boxscore | Pts: Schilb 31; Rebs: Balvín 19; Asts: Schilb 7 | Arena: Save-On-Foods Memorial Centre; Referees: Aleksandar Glišić (SRB), Leandro Lezcano (ARG), Luis Castillo (ESP) |

| November 28 2023 FIBA World Cup qualifiers – First round | Canada | 115–73 | Bahamas | Santo Domingo, Dominican Republic |
| 17:00 UTC−4 | Scoring by quarter: 32–22, 29–16, 31–13, 23–22 |
| | Pts: Wiltjer 23; Rebs: Alexander 12; Asts: P. Scrubb 11 | Boxscore | Pts: Bridgewater 13; Rebs: four players 5 Asts: Carey, Munnings 5 | Arena: Palacio de los Deportes Virgilio Travieso Soto; Attendance: 0 Referees: Jorge Vázquez (PUR), Carlos Peralta (ECU), Krishna Domínguez (MEX) |

| November 29 2023 FIBA World Cup qualifiers – First round | Bahamas | 77–113 | Canada | Santo Domingo, Dominican Republic |
| 17:00 UTC−4 | Scoring by quarter: 26–34, 20–24, 13–25, 18–30 |
| | Pts: Nesbitt 18; Rebs: Munnings 8 Asts: Munnings 6 | Boxscore | Pts: Wiltjer 25; Rebs: Bennett, T. Scrubb 8 Asts: Chery 7 | Arena: Palacio de los Deportes Virgilio Travieso Soto; Attendance: 0 Referees: Julio Anaya (PAN), Felipe Ibarra (CHI), Norval Young (ISV) |

=== 2022 ===
| February 26 2023 FIBA World Cup qualifiers – First round | Canada | 85–79 | Dominican Republic | Santo Domingo, Dominican Republic |
| 18:00 UTC−4 | Scoring by quarter: 22–20, 20–16, 22–20, 21–23 |
| | Pts: Wiltjer 15; Rebs: T. Scrubb 7 Asts: P. Scrubb 4 | Boxscore | Pts: Liz 29; Rebs: Delgado 13; Asts: Solano 4 | Arena: Palacio de los Deportes Virgilio Travieso Soto; Attendance: 2,000; Referees: Jesed Díaz (PUR), Jenna Reneau (USA), Johnny Batista (PUR) |

| February 27 2023 FIBA World Cup qualifiers – First round | Canada | 94–46 | Virgin Islands | Santo Domingo, Dominican Republic |
| 15:00 UTC−4 | Scoring by quarter: 27–14, 16–7, 22–9, 29–16 |
| | Pts: Wiltjer 24; Rebs: Young 9 Asts: Bell-Haynes, Kajami-Keane 6 | Boxscore | Pts: Christmas 15; Rebs: Christmas 10; Asts: Francis 4 | Arena: Palacio de los Deportes Virgilio Travieso Soto; Attendance: 500; Referees: Jesed Díaz (PUR), Jenna Reneau (USA), Johnny Batista (PUR) |

| July 1 2023 FIBA World Cup qualifiers – First round | Dominican Republic | 75–95 | Canada | Hamilton, Canada |
| 19:00 UTC−4 | Scoring by quarter: 16–21, 20–25, 12–30, 27–19 |
| | Pts: Henríquez 14; Rebs: Delgado 10; Asts: Solano 5 | Boxscore | Pts: Gilgeous-Alexander 32; Rebs: Olynyk 11; Asts: Olynyk 6 | Arena: FirstOntario Centre; Attendance: 5,312; Referees: Roberto Vázquez (PUR), Hortencia Sánchez (MEX), Diego Chiconato (BRA) |

| July 4 2023 FIBA World Cup qualifiers – First round | Virgin Islands | 67–113 | Canada | Saint Thomas, U.S. Virgin Islands |
| 17:00 UTC−4 | Scoring by quarter: 8–28, 13–24, 27–37, 19–24 |
| | Pts: Smith 14; Rebs: Aska, Jules 6 Asts: Richards 3 | Boxscore | Pts: Gilgeous-Alexander, Robertson 24; Rebs: three players 6 Asts: Alexander-Walker 7 | Arena: Sports and Fitness Center; Referees: Carlos Peralta (ECU), Krishna Domínguez (MEX), Yezid Carreño (COL) |

| August 25 2023 FIBA World Cup qualifiers – Second round | Canada | 99–87 | Argentina | Victoria, Canada |
| 19:40 UTC−7 | Scoring by quarter: 28–21, 24–18, 31–29, 16–19 |
| | Pts: Gilgeous-Alexander 23; Rebs: Olynyk, Powell 7 Asts: Gilgeous-Alexander 8 | Boxscore | Pts: Laprovíttola 30; Rebs: Delía 9 Asts: Campazzo 8 | Arena: Save-On-Foods Memorial Centre; Attendance: 6,200; Referees: Jorge Vázquez (PUR), Jenna Reneau (USA), Blanca Burns (USA) |

| August 29 2023 FIBA World Cup qualifiers – Second round | Panama | 50–106 | Canada | Panama City, Panama |
| 19:10 UTC−5 | Scoring by quarter: 7–33, 18–31, 11–28, 14–14 |
| | Pts: Jackson 16; Rebs: Ayarza 7 Asts: Gaskins 3 | Boxscore | Pts: Olynyk 18; Rebs: Powell 8 Asts: Olynyk, Pangos 5 | Arena: Roberto Durán Arena; Referees: Omar Bermúdez (MEX), Andrés Bartel (URU), Johnny Batista (PUR) |

| September 2 2022 FIBA AmeriCup – Group stage | Brazil | 72–63 | Canada | Recife, Brazil |
| 20:10 UTC−3 | Scoring by quarter: 17–15, 15–9, 18–22, 22–17 |
| | Pts: Yago 13; Rebs: Meindl 9 Asts: De Paula 4 | Boxscore | Pts: Banton 20; Rebs: Banton 11; Asts: Kennedy 2 | Arena: Ginásio de Esportes Geraldo Magalhães; Referees: Roberto Vázquez (PUR), Julio Anaya (PAN), Daniel García (VEN) |

| September 3 2022 FIBA AmeriCup – Group stage | Canada | 84–78 | Uruguay | Recife, Brazil |
| 17:40 UTC−3 | Scoring by quarter: 17–19, 25–18, 12–24, 30–17 |
| | Pts: Blair 23; Rebs: Banton 5 Asts: Banton 6 | Boxscore | Pts: Rodríguez 21; Rebs: Iglesias 5 Asts: Parodi, Rodríguez 6 | Arena: Ginásio de Esportes Geraldo Magalhães; Referees: Roberto Vázquez (PUR), Juan Fernández (ARG), Blanca Burns (USA) |

| September 5 2022 FIBA AmeriCup – Group stage | Colombia | 61–62 | Canada | Recife, Brazil |
| 11:10 UTC−3 | Scoring by quarter: 16–21, 22–9, 16–12, 7–20 |
| | Pts: Echenique 18; Rebs: Tello 10; Asts: Atencia, Rojas 4 | Boxscore | Pts: Banton 20; Rebs: Pandi 7 Asts: Banton 5 | Arena: Ginásio de Esportes Geraldo Magalhães; Referees: Omar Bermúdez (MEX), Jenna Reneau (USA), Hortencia Sánchez (MEX) |

| September 8 2022 FIBA AmeriCup – Quarter-finals | Mexico | 77–82 | Canada | Recife, Brazil |
| 11:10 UTC−3 | Scoring by quarter: 19–17, 11–13, 22–24, 25–28 |
| | Pts: Amigo 20; Rebs: Jaimes 10; Asts: Bonilla 7 | Boxscore | Pts: Banton 16; Rebs: Bell-Haynes 6 Asts: Banton 7 | Arena: Ginásio de Esportes Geraldo Magalhães; Referees: Jorge Vázquez (PUR), Carlos Peralta (ECU), Juan Fernández (ARG) |

| September 10 2022 FIBA AmeriCup – Semi-finals | Brazil | 86–76 | Canada | Recife, Brazil |
| 20:40 UTC−3 | Scoring by quarter: 24–20, 20–14, 23–20, 19–22 |
| | Pts: Meindl 19; Rebs: Dias 8 Asts: Huertas 8 | Boxscore | Pts: Blair 24; Rebs: Bell-Haynes 6 Asts: Banton, Bell-Haynes 4 | Arena: Ginásio de Esportes Geraldo Magalhães; Referees: Julio Anaya (PAN), Krishna Domínguez (MEX), Carlos Vélez (COL) |

| September 11 2022 FIBA AmeriCup – Third place game | Canada | 80–84 | United States | Recife, Brazil |
| 17:10 UTC−3 | Scoring by quarter: 16–15, 20–14, 21–25, 23–30 |
| | Pts: Kigab 18; Rebs: three players 5 Asts: Gray 7 | Boxscore | Pts: Clark 18; Rebs: Zimmerman 8 Asts: Cole 8 | Arena: Ginásio de Esportes Geraldo Magalhães; Referees: Guilherme Locatelli (BRA), Daniel García (VEN), Kristian Paez (ECU) |

| November 10 2023 FIBA World Cup qualifiers – Second round | Canada | 94–56 | Venezuela | Edmonton, Canada |
| 19:10 UTC−7 | Scoring by quarter: 25–10, 21–21, 24–11, 24–14 |
| | Pts: Robertson 16; Rebs: Klassen 10; Asts: Chery 6 | Boxscore | Pts: Zamora 14; Rebs: Colmenares 7 Asts: Cubillán 4 | Arena: Edmonton Expo Centre; Attendance: 3,129; Referees: Roberto Vázquez (PUR), Johnny Batista (PUR), Alan dos Santos (BRA) |

| November 13 2023 FIBA World Cup qualifiers – Second round | Canada | 112–71 | Panama | Edmonton, Canada |
| 17:10 UTC−7 | Scoring by quarter: 30–21, 22–11, 33–17, 27–22 |
| | Pts: Best 22; Rebs: Klassen 8 Asts: Klassen, T. Scrubb 5 | Boxscore | Pts: Oglivie 14; Rebs: Oglivie, Romero 9 Asts: Rodriguez 5 | Arena: Edmonton Expo Centre; Attendance: 3,181; Referees: Jorge Vázquez (PUR), Grant Todey (USA), Claudio Osorio (CHI) |

=== 2023 ===
| February 23 2023 FIBA World Cup qualifiers – Second round | Argentina | 83–72 | Canada | Mar del Plata, Argentina |
| 21:40 UTC−3 | Scoring by quarter: 17–18, 23–13, 21–19, 22–22 |
| | Pts: Brussino, Campazzo 13; Rebs: Delía 7 Asts: Campazzo 11 | Boxscore | Pts: T. Scrubb 18; Rebs: Young 9 Asts: P. Scrubb 5 | Arena: Polideportivo Islas Malvinas; Referees: Roberto Vázquez (PUR), Johnny Batista (PUR), Alan dos Santos (BRA) |

| February 26 2023 FIBA World Cup qualifiers – Second round | Venezuela | 57–74 | Canada | Caracas, Venezuela |
| 20:10 UTC−4 | Scoring by quarter: 17–22, 13–15, 8–16, 19–21 |
| | Pts: Colmenares 13; Rebs: Carrera 11; Asts: Cubillán 4 | Boxscore | Pts: P. Scrubb, Young 14; Rebs: T. Scrubb 5 Asts: Bell-Haynes 7 | Arena: Poliedro de Caracas; Attendance: 12,609; Referees: Krishna Domínguez (MEX), Andrés García (URU), Alan dos Santos (BRA) |

| August 9 Friendly | Germany | 86–81 | Canada | Berlin, Germany |
| 19:30 UTC+2 | Scoring by quarter: 27–14, 23–20, 16–24, 20–23 |
| | Pts: F. Wagner 18 | Boxscore | Pts: Dort 14 | Arena: Mercedes-Benz Arena |

| August 12 DBB Supercup 2023 | Canada | 107–76 | New Zealand | Hamburg, Germany |
| 15:45 UTC+2 | Scoring by quarter: 28–24, 39–14, 18–24, 22–14 |
| | Pts: Gilgeous-Alexander 26; Rebs: Alexander-Walker 8 Asts: Bell-Haynes 4 | Boxscore | Pts: Delany 13; Rebs: Brown 7 Asts: Cameron 4 | Arena: Edel-optics.de Arena; Attendance: 3,400 |

| August 13 DBB Supercup 2023 | Germany | 112–113(OT) | Canada | Hamburg, Germany |
| 18:30 UTC+2 | Scoring by quarter: 26–20, 23–25, 38–33, 14–23, Overtime: 11–12 |
| | Pts: Schröder 26; Rebs: M. Wagner 7 Asts: Schröder 8 | Boxscore | Pts: Barrett 31; Rebs: Gilgeous-Alexander 8 Asts: Gilgeous-Alexander 6 | Arena: Edel-optics.de Arena; Attendance: 3,400 |

| August 17 Friendly | Spain | 80–85(OT) | Canada | Granada, Spain |
| 21:30 UTC+2 | Scoring by quarter: 21–27, 44–40, 56–55, 73–73, Overtime: 7–12 |
| | Pts: J. Hernangómez 12; Rebs: Garuba 8 Asts: R. Fernández 6 | Boxscore | Pts: Gilgeous-Alexander 22; Rebs: Powell 12; Asts: Olynyk 6 | Arena: Palacio Municipal de Deportes |

| August 18; Friendly | Canada | 88–94 | Dominican Republic | Granada, Spain |
| 21:30 UTC+2 | Scoring by quarter: 26–27, 21–21, 19–18, 22–28 |
| | Pts: Dort 12; Rebs: Dort 5 Asts: P. Scrubb 3 | Boxscore | Pts: Towns 20; Rebs: Delgado 12; Asts: Feliz 6 | Arena: Palacio Municipal de Deportes |

| August 25 2023 FIBA World Cup – Group stage | Canada | 95–65 | France | Jakarta, Indonesia |
| 20:30 UTC+7 | Scoring by quarter: 14–18, 29–22, 25–8, 27–17 |
| | Pts: Gilgeous-Alexander 27; Rebs: Gilgeous-Alexander 13; Asts: Gilgeous-Alexander 6 | Boxscore | Pts: Fournier 21; Rebs: Gobert 9 Asts: Okobo 4 | Arena: Indonesia Arena; Attendance: 12,091; Referees: Roberto Vázquez (PUR), Johnny Batista (PUR), Gvidas Gedvilas (LTU) |

| August 27 2023 FIBA World Cup – Group stage | Lebanon | 73–128 | Canada | Jakarta, Indonesia |
| 16:45 UTC+7 | Scoring by quarter: 13–29, 17–37, 18–34, 25–28 |
| | Pts: Spellman 16; Rebs: three players 3 Asts: Arakji 5 | Boxscore | Pts: Barrett 17; Rebs: Olynyk 8 Asts: Bell-Haynes 8 | Arena: Indonesia Arena; Attendance: 10,180; Referees: Roberto Vázquez (PUR), Jenna Reneau (USA), Daigo Urushima (JPN) |

| August 29 2023 FIBA World Cup – Group stage | Canada | 101–75 | Latvia | Jakarta, Indonesia |
| 20:30 UTC+7 | Scoring by quarter: 13–29, 30–19, 24–15, 34–18 |
| | Pts: Gilgeous-Alexander 27; Rebs: Ejim 7 Asts: Gilgeous-Alexander 6 | Boxscore | Pts: Gražulis 16; Rebs: R. Kurucs 10; Asts: Šķēle 6 | Arena: Indonesia Arena; Attendance: 11,186; Referees: Juan Fernández (ARG), Jenna Reneau (USA), Johnny Batista (PUR) |

| September 1 2023 FIBA World Cup – Second round | Canada | 65–69 | Brazil | Jakarta, Indonesia |
| 20:30 UTC+7 | Scoring by quarter: 13–16, 24–11, 15–18, 13–24 |
| | Pts: Gilgeous-Alexander 23; Rebs: Olynyk 7 Asts: Alexander-Walker 3 | Boxscore | Pts: Caboclo 19; Rebs: Caboclo 13; Asts: Yago 10 | Arena: Indonesia Arena; Attendance: 8,934; Referees: Julio Anaya (PAN), Jenna Reneau (USA), Johnny Batista (PUR) |

| September 3 2023 FIBA World Cup – Second round | Spain | 85–88 | Canada | Jakarta, Indonesia |
| 20:30 UTC+7 | Scoring by quarter: 21–21, 27–17, 25–23, 12–27 |
| | Pts: W. Hernangómez 25; Rebs: W. Hernangómez 6 Asts: Fernández, Núñez 7 | Boxscore | Pts: Gilgeous-Alexander 30; Rebs: three players 5 Asts: Gilgeous-Alexander 7 | Arena: Indonesia Arena; Attendance: 12,493; Referees: Julio Anaya (PAN), Juan Fernández (ARG), Jenna Reneau (USA) |

| September 6 2023 FIBA World Cup – Quarter-finals | Canada | 100–89 | Slovenia | Pasay, Philippines |
| 20:40 UTC+8 | Scoring by quarter: 26–24, 24–26, 30–21, 20–18 |
| | Pts: Gilgeous-Alexander 31; Rebs: Gilgeous-Alexander 10; Asts: Gilgeous-Alexander, Olynyk 4 | Boxscore | Pts: Dončić 26; Rebs: Tobey 6 Asts: Dončić 5 | Arena: Mall of Asia Arena; Attendance: 11,710; Referees: Roberto Vázquez (PUR), Manuel Mazzoni (ITA), Gatis Saliņš (LAT) |

| September 8 2023 FIBA World Cup – Semi-finals | Serbia | 95–86 | Canada | Pasay, Philippines |
| 16:45 UTC+8 | Scoring by quarter: 23–15, 29–24, 23–24, 20–23 |
| | Pts: Bogdanović 23; Rebs: Milutinov 10; Asts: S. Jovic 5 | Boxscore | Pts: Barrett 23; Rebs: five players 3 Asts: Gilgeous-Alexander 9 | Arena: Mall of Asia Arena; Attendance: 8,630; Referees: Yohan Rosso (FRA), Julio Anaya (PAN), Manuel Mazzoni (ITA) |

| September 10 2023 FIBA World Cup – Third place game | United States | 118–127(OT) | Canada | Pasay, Philippines |
| 16:30 UTC+8 | Scoring by quarter: 25–34, 31–24, 26–33, 29–20, Overtime: 7–16 |
| | Pts: Edwards 24; Rebs: Bridges 9 Asts: Haliburton 7 | Boxscore | Pts: Brooks 39; Rebs: Barrett, Powell 7 Asts: Gilgeous-Alexander 12 | Arena: Mall of Asia Arena; Attendance: 10,666; Referees: Yohan Rosso (FRA), Julio Anaya (PAN), Takaki Kato (JPN) |

=== 2024 ===
| February 23 2025 FIBA AmeriCup qualifiers | Canada | 96–51 | Nicaragua | St. Catharines, Canada |
| 19:10 UTC−5 | Scoring by quarter: 28–18, 23–17, 26–13, 19–3 |
| | Pts: Best 21; Rebs: Young 9 Asts: P. Scrubb 8 | Boxscore | Pts: Garth 14; Rebs: Cacho 6 Asts: Ruiz 6 | Arena: Meridian Centre; Attendance: 3,166; Referees: Jesed Diaz (PUR), Yezid Valentine Carreño Pinzon (COL), Williset Ernesto Del Valle Montalvo (PUR) |

| February 26 2025 FIBA AmeriCup qualifiers | Nicaragua | 46–88 | Canada | Managua, Nicaragua |
| 19:10 UTC−6 | Scoring by quarter: 15–25, 11–17, 11–27, 9–19 |
| | Pts: Ruiz 11; Rebs: Cacho 6 Asts: Ruiz 4 | Boxscore | Pts: Rowe 19; Rebs: Rowe 10; Asts: Kajami-Keane 10 | Arena: Polideportivo Alexis Argüello; Attendance: 6,323; Referees: Johnny Batista (PUR), Alan Dos Santos (BRA), Orlando Jose Varela Diaz (HON) |

| July 10 Friendly | United States | 86–72 | Canada | Las Vegas, United States |
| 19:30 UTC−7 | Scoring by quarter: 14–21, 27–12, 28–21, 17–18 |
| | Pts: Edwards 13; Rebs: Davis 11; Asts: Haliburton 6 | Boxscore | Pts: Barrett 12; Rebs: three players 5 Asts: three players 3 | Arena: T-Mobile Arena; Attendance: 20,757 |

| July 19 Friendly | France | 73–85 | Canada | Orléans, France |
| 21:00 UTC+2 | Scoring by quarter: 19–25, 21–19, 18–20, 15–21 |
| | Pts: Yabusele 19; Rebs: Wembanyama 7 Asts: Wembanyama 4 | Boxscore | Pts: Gilgeous-Alexander 23; Rebs: Birch 6 Asts: Gilgeous-Alexander, Nembhard 5 | Arena: CO'Met Arena |

| July 21 Friendly | Canada | 103–93 | Puerto Rico | Orléans, France |
| 20:00 UTC+2 | Scoring by quarter: 23–23, 23–17, 32–24, 25–29 |
| | Pts: Brooks 21; Rebs: Barrett 7 Asts: Gilgeous-Alexander 6 | Boxscore | Pts: Alvarado 21; Rebs: Romero 8 Asts: Alvarado 6 | Arena: CO'Met Arena |

| July 27 2024 Summer Olympics – Group stage | Greece | 79–86 | Canada | Lille, France |
| 21:00 UTC+2 | Scoring by quarter: 22–26, 16–22, 22–20, 19–18 |
| | Pts: Antetokounmpo 34; Rebs: Mitoglou 8 Asts: Calathes 7 | Boxscore | Pts: Barrett 23; Rebs: Olynyk 6 Asts: Gilgeous-Alexander 7 | Arena: Pierre Mauroy Stadium; Attendance: 26,421; Referees: Roberto Vázquez (PUR), Johnny Batista (PUR), Wojciech Liszka (POL) |

| July 30 2024 Summer Olympics – Group stage | Canada | 93–83 | Australia | Lille, France |
| 13:30 UTC+2 | Scoring by quarter: 26–28, 19–21, 27–21, 21–13 |
| | Pts: Barrett 24; Rebs: Powell 9 Asts: Barrett, Murray 5 | Boxscore | Pts: Giddey 19; Rebs: Landale 12; Asts: Giddey 6 | Arena: Pierre Mauroy Stadium; Attendance: 26,980; Referees: Yohan Rosso (FRA), Johnny Batista (PUR), Takaki Kato (JPN) |

| August 2 2024 Summer Olympics – Group stage | Canada | 88–85 | Spain | Lille, France |
| 17:15 UTC+2 | Scoring by quarter: 19–19, 30–19, 15–18, 24–29 |
| | Pts: Gilgeous-Alexander 20; Rebs: Brooks, Murray 4 Asts: Murray 6 | Boxscore | Pts: Brizuela 17; Rebs: Aldama 11; Asts: three players 4 | Arena: Pierre Mauroy Stadium; Attendance: 26,133; Referees: Ademir Zurapović (BIH), Julio Anaya (PAN), Gatis Saliņš (LAT) |

| August 6 2024 Summer Olympics – Quarter-finals | France | 82–73 | Canada | Paris, France |
| 18:00 UTC+2 | Scoring by quarter: 23–10, 22–19, 16–21, 21–23 |
| | Pts: Yabusele 22; Rebs: Wembanyama 12; Asts: Wembanyama 5 | Boxscore | Pts: Gilgeous-Alexander 27; Rebs: Powell 9 Asts: Gilgeous-Alexander 4 | Arena: Accor Arena; Attendance: 12,258; Referees: Ademir Zurapović (BIH), Omar Bermúdez (MEX), Gatis Saliņš (LAT) |

| November 21 2025 FIBA AmeriCup qualifiers | Canada | 88–71 | Dominican Republic | Saskatoon, Canada |
| 19:10 UTC−6 | Scoring by quarter: 25–18, 24–19, 18–10, 21–24 |
| | Pts: Kabengele 17; Rebs: Rowe 9 Asts: Bell-Haynes 10 | Boxscore | Pts: Figueroa 18; Rebs: Liz 6 Asts: Bautista 7 | Arena: SaskTel Centre; Attendance: 2,981; Referees: Julio Anaya (PAN), Andrés Bartel (URU), Alan dos Santos (BRA) |

| November 24 2025 FIBA AmeriCup qualifiers | Canada | 83–73 | Mexico | Saskatoon, Canada |
| 14:10 UTC−6 | Scoring by quarter: 24–14, 19–24, 23–25, 17–10 |
| | Pts: Bell-Haynes 20; Rebs: Kabengele 12; Asts: Carr 10 | Boxscore | Pts: Rodríguez 21; Rebs: Bonilla 8 Asts: Bonilla 11 | Arena: SaskTel Centre; Attendance: 3,914; Referees: Roberto Vázquez (PUR), Leonardo Zalazar (ARG), Carlos Vélez (COL) |

=== 2025 ===
| February 21 2025 FIBA AmeriCup qualifiers | Dominican Republic | 74–65 | Canada | Santo Domingo, Dominican Republic |
| 20:10 UTC−4 | Scoring by quarter: 19–17, 18–15, 19–13, 18–20 |
| | Pts: Feliz 18; Rebs: Delgado, Feliz 6 Asts: Jones, Montero 4 | Boxscore | Pts: Bell-Haynes, Kabengele 12; Rebs: Kabengele 12; Asts: Bell-Haynes 6 | Arena: Centro Olímpico Juan Pablo Duarte; Attendance: 2,000; Referees: Roberto Vázquez (PUR), Juan Fernández (ARG), Orlando Varela (HON) |

| February 24 2025 FIBA AmeriCup qualifiers | Mexico | 98–94 | Canada | San Luis Potosí, Mexico |
| 19:00 UTC−6 | Scoring by quarter: 26–29, 28–22, 15–20, 29–23 |
| | Pts: Cruz 30; Rebs: Bonilla 8 Asts: Avila, Cruz 4 | Boxscore | Pts: Kabengele 24; Rebs: Mike 10; Asts: Carr 8 | Arena: Arena Potosí; Attendance: 7,924; Referees: Johnny Batista (PUR), Daniel García (VEN), Alan dos Santos (BRA) |

| August 22 2025 FIBA AmeriCup – Group stage | Venezuela | 54–88 | Canada | Managua, Nicaragua |
| 15:40 UTC−6 | Scoring by quarter: 13–26, 13–15, 18–25, 10–20 |
| | Pts: Sifontes 14; Rebs: Sifontes 5 Asts: Mijares, Sifontes 4 | Boxscore | Pts: George 18; Rebs: Muenkat 9 Asts: Bell-Haynes 9 | Arena: Polideportivo Alexis Argüello; Attendance: 500; Referees: Omar Bermúdez (MEX), Andrés Bartel (URU), Orlando Varela (HON) |

| August 23 2025 FIBA AmeriCup – Group stage | Canada | 99–49 | Panama | Managua, Nicaragua |
| 21:10 UTC−6 | Scoring by quarter: 33–16, 21–15, 24–4, 21–14 |
| | Pts: Darling 22; Rebs: Wiltjer 9 Asts: Carr 6 | Boxscore | Pts: Rodríguez Jr. 10; Rebs: Gedeon 5 Asts: three players 2 | Arena: Polideportivo Alexis Argüello; Attendance: 500; Referees: Carlos Vélez (COL), Orlando Varela (HON), Alan dos Santos (BRA) |

| August 25 2025 FIBA AmeriCup – Group stage | Canada | 82–73 | Puerto Rico | Managua, Nicaragua |
| 21:10 UTC−6 | Scoring by quarter: 20–18, 16–16, 22–23, 24–16 |
| | Pts: George 17; Rebs: Kabengele 10; Asts: Wiltjer 5 | Boxscore | Pts: Alvarado 20; Rebs: Conditt IV 8 Asts: Clavell 7 | Arena: Polideportivo Alexis Argüello; Attendance: 5,000; Referees: Andrés Bartel (URU), Krishna Domínguez (MEX), Orlando Varela (HON) |

| August 28 2025 FIBA AmeriCup – Quarter-finals | Canada | 94–56 | Colombia | Managua, Nicaragua |
| 21:10 UTC−6 | Scoring by quarter: 28–15, 26–10, 23–20, 17–11 |
| | Pts: George 18; Rebs: Miller 9 Asts: Bell-Haynes 6 | Boxscore | Pts: Atencia 19; Rebs: Angola 5 Asts: Angola 3 | Arena: Polideportivo Alexis Argüello; Attendance: 1,500; Referees: Andrés Bartel (URU), Krishna Domínguez (MEX), Fernando Leite (BRA) |

| August 30 2025 FIBA AmeriCup – Semi-finals | Canada | 73–83 | Argentina | Managua, Nicaragua |
| 18:10 UTC−6 | Scoring by quarter: 9–24, 20–22, 16–22, 28–15 |
| | Pts: Carr 16; Rebs: Kabengele 8 Asts: Carr 4 | Boxscore | Pts: Vildoza 26; Rebs: Corbalán 11; Asts: Corbalán, Vildoza 6 | Arena: Polideportivo Alexis Argüello; Attendance: 8,000; Referees: Julio Anaya (PAN), Carlos Vélez (COL), Orlando Varela (HON) |

| August 31 2025 FIBA AmeriCup – Third place game | Canada | 85–90 | United States | Managua, Nicaragua |
| 14:40 UTC−6 | Scoring by quarter: 18–23, 19–26, 24–19, 24–22 |
| | Pts: Carr, Kabengele 16; Rebs: Miller 9 Asts: Carr 7 | Boxscore | Pts: Cavanaugh, Smart 21; Rebs: Cooley 8 Asts: Grant 7 | Arena: Polideportivo Alexis Argüello; Attendance: 700; Referees: Julio Anaya (PAN), Daniel García (VEN), Alan dos Santos (BRA) |

| November 28 2027 FIBA World Cup qualifiers – First round | Bahamas | 75–111 | Canada | Nassau, Bahamas |
| 20:40 UTC−5 | Scoring by quarter: 34–24, 14–24, 17–28, 20–25 |
| | Pts: Bridgewater 15; Rebs: Jones 8 Asts: Bridgewater 12 | Boxscore | Pts: Wiltjer 22; Rebs: three players 6 Asts: Bell-Haynes 7 | Arena: Kendal Isaacs Gymnasium; Attendance: 200; Referees: Julio Anaya (PAN), Carlos Vélez (COL), Orlando Varela (HON) |

| December 1 2027 FIBA World Cup qualifiers – First round | Canada | 94–88 | Bahamas | Toronto, Canada |
| 19:10 UTC−5 | Scoring by quarter: 23–11, 29–25, 23–26, 19–26 |
| | Pts: Bell-Haynes 17; Rebs: Kennedy 6 Asts: Bell-Haynes 10 | Boxscore | Pts: Clarke 20; Rebs: Burrows 7 Asts: Clarke 13 | Arena: Mattamy Athletic Centre; Referees: Omar Bermúdez (MEX), Andrés Bartel (URU), Alan dos Santos (BRA) |

=== 2026 ===
| February 26 2027 FIBA World Cup qualifiers – First round | Puerto Rico | 85–96(OT) | Canada | San Juan, Puerto Rico |
| 20:10 UTC−4 | Scoring by quarter: 23–13, 12–23, 22–23, 25–23, Overtime: 3–14 |
| | Pts: Plummer 22; Rebs: Piñeiro 9 Asts: Piñeiro, Zeigler 5 | Boxscore | Pts: Carr 35; Rebs: Bediako 7 Asts: Carr 9 | Arena: Roberto Clemente Coliseum; Referees: Julio Anaya (PAN), Juan Fernández (ARG), Orlando Varela (HON) |

| March 1 2027 FIBA World Cup qualifiers – First round | Jamaica | 81–97 | Canada | Kingston, Jamaica |
| 18:00 UTC−5 | Scoring by quarter: 19–27, 17–22, 22–29, 23–19 |
| | Pts: De Lattibeaudiere 23; Rebs: De Lattibeaudiere 11; Asts: Thelwell 5 | Boxscore | Pts: Carr 17; Rebs: Bediako 9 Asts: Carr 7 | Arena: National Indoor Sports Centre; Attendance: 3,937; Referees: Daniel García (VEN), Roberto Fernández (CRC), Fernando Leite (BRA) |

| July 3 2027 FIBA World Cup qualifiers – First round | Canada | 110–84 | Puerto Rico | Hamilton, Canada |
| 19:10 UTC−4 | Scoring by quarter: 31–16, 25–22, 27–22, 27–24 |
| | Pts: Gilgeous-Alexander 26; Rebs: three players 5 Asts: Alexander-Walker 7 | Boxscore | Pts: Romero 17; Rebs: Freeman 9 Asts: three players 4 | Arena: TD Coliseum; Attendance: 9,826; Referees: Omar Bermúdez (MEX), Carlos Vélez (COL), Samuel Hidalgo (DOM) |

| July 6 2027 FIBA World Cup qualifiers – First round | Canada | 116–78 | Jamaica | Hamilton, Canada |
| 19:10 UTC−4 | Scoring by quarter: 32–15, 25–25, 32–15, 27–23 |
| | Pts: Brooks 20; Rebs: Wiltjer 5 Asts: Gilgeous-Alexander, R. Nembhard 5 | Boxscore | Pts: Thelwell 25; Rebs: Thompson 8 Asts: Bailey, Thelwell 3 | Arena: TD Coliseum; Attendance: 10,441; Referees: Juan Fernández (ARG), Diego Chiconato (BRA), César Gonçalves (BRA) |

| August 27 2027 FIBA World Cup qualifiers – Second round | Panama | 66–86 | Canada | Panama City, Panama |
| 20:40 UTC−5 | Scoring by quarter: 14–14, 20–23, 17–22, 15–27 |
| | Pts: Rodríguez Jr. 17; Rebs: Romero 8 Asts: Gaskins 9 | Boxscore | Pts: Bell-Haynes 18; Rebs: Birch 8 Asts: Carr 12 | Arena: Roberto Durán Arena; Attendance: 3,890; Referees: Alan dos Santos (BRA), Krishna Domínguez (MEX), Fernando Leite (BRA) |

| August 31 2027 FIBA World Cup qualifiers – Second round | Canada | 97–92 | Argentina | Quebec City, Canada |
| 19:10 UTC−4 | Scoring by quarter: 23–29, 25–24, 25–16, 24–23 |
| | Pts: Alexander-Walker 26; Rebs: Kabengele 11; Asts: Carr 8 | Boxscore | Pts: Laprovíttola 31; Rebs: Bolmaro 7 Asts: Bolmaro, Campazzo 5 | Arena: Centre Vidéotron; Attendance: 12,380; Referees: Omar Bermúdez (MEX), Grant Todey (USA), Diego Chiconato (BRA) |

| November 26 2027 FIBA World Cup qualifiers – Second round | Uruguay | vs. | Canada | Montevideo, Uruguay |
| 19:00 UTC−3 |
| | | Boxscore | | Arena: Antel Arena |

| November 29 2027 FIBA World Cup qualifiers – Second round | Argentina | vs. | Canada | Zárate, Argentina |
| 18:10 UTC−3 |
| | | Boxscore | | Arena: Espacio DAM |

=== 2027 ===
| February 26 2027 FIBA World Cup qualifiers – Second round | Canada | vs. | Panama | Canada |
| --:-- |
| | | Boxscore |

| March 1 2027 FIBA World Cup qualifiers – Second round | Canada | vs. | Uruguay | Canada |
| --:-- |
| | | Boxscore |
