= 2023 FIBA Basketball World Cup final =

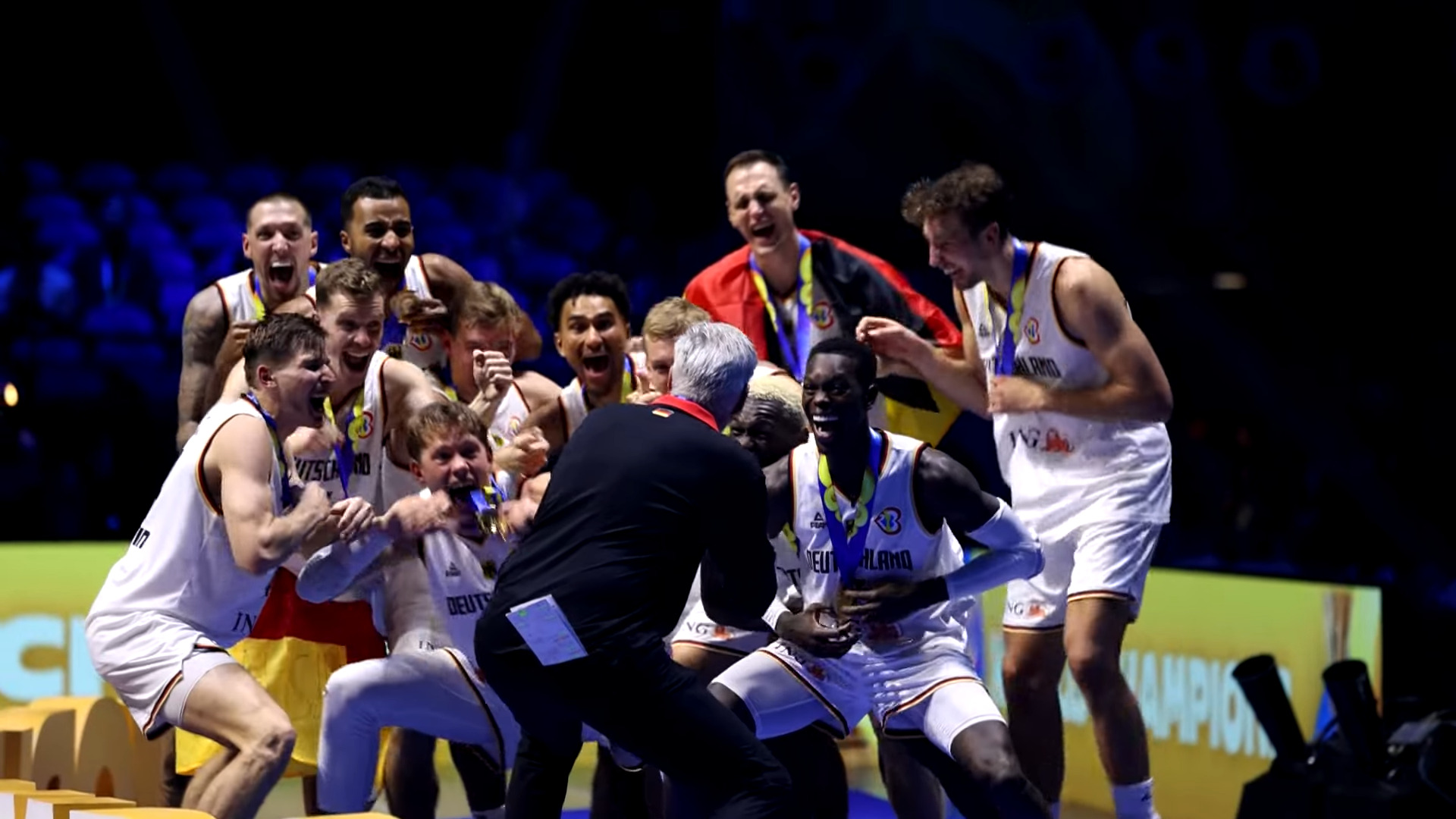
- The Germany national team celebrating winning the World Cup.
- Event: 2023 FIBA Basketball World Cup
Germany	Serbia
83	77
	1	2	3	4	Total
Germany	23	24	22	14	83
Serbia	26	21	10	20	77
- Date: 10 September 2023
- Venue: SM Mall of Asia Arena, Pasay, Metro Manila
- Coaches: Gordon Herbert (Germany); Svetislav Pešić (Serbia)
- TCL Man of the Match: Franz Wagner (Germany)
- Referees: Roberto Vázquez (Puerto Rico); Omar Bermúdez (Mexico); Gatis Saliņš (Latvia)
- Attendance: 12,022

The 2023 FIBA Basketball World Cup final was the concluding basketball game which determined the winner of the 2023 FIBA Basketball World Cup. The game was played on 10 September 2023, at the Mall of Asia Arena, in Pasay, Metro Manila, Philippines, between Germany and Serbia. It was the first all-European final since 2006 in Japan, when Spain won its first title against Greece.

At halftime, a turnover ceremony was held to officially hand over the hosting rights of the FIBA Basketball World Cup from the Philippines, Japan, and Indonesia to Qatar, host of the 2027 FIBA Basketball World Cup, the first in tournament history to be held in the Middle East and North Africa region. The Naismith Trophy was awarded to the winning team for the second time since the adoption of its new version in 2017, with Germany winning its first World Cup title.

== Background ==
The 2023 FIBA Basketball World Cup was the 19th edition of the tournament, held in multiple countries for the first time in its history in the Philippines, Japan, and Indonesia, between 25 August and 10 September 2023. Japan and the Philippines automatically qualified as hosts but Indonesia weren't able to qualify after failing to reach the quarterfinals of the 2022 FIBA Asia Cup, which was the condition set by FIBA for the country to qualify for the tournament. 80 teams competed for the remaining 30 spots through qualification windows organized by FIBA's four confederations (Africa, Americas, Asia-Oceania, Europe) and were held from November 2021 to February 2023. In the final draw, the 32 qualified teams were then divided into eight groups of four teams, with each team playing each other once in a round-robin format. The top two teams in each group qualified for the second round made up of the teams that advanced from the first round, with groups being formed by joining pairs of first-round groups together (A and B to I, C and D to J, E and F to K, and G and H to L). The top two teams from each group advanced to a knock-out phase.

The defending champions from the 2019 World Cup were Spain. They managed to top their first round group but were eliminated in the second round, finishing at third behind Canada and Latvia. Both Germany and Serbia have not won the FIBA Basketball World Cup once, but the latter cliched two consecutive titles in 1998 and 2002, respectively, as the former Yugoslavia. Germany won its last matchup against Serbia at the World Cup in 2010 in double-overtime, 82–81.

Serbia reached the 2014 final and the 2016 Olympic final, but lost to the United States on both occasions. They were also eliminated by Argentina in the quarter-finals of the 2019 tournament. Under head coach Svetislav Pešić, Serbia won all of its five games in the group phase and finished 9th at the EuroBasket 2022. The 2023 final would be the first for Germany in their seventh World Cup appearance and sixth as Germany, as they were formerly known as West Germany in their tournament debut in 1986. Their previous best performance was at the 2002 World Cup, where they won the bronze medal after winning against New Zealand in the third-place game. Under head coach Gordon Herbert, Germany also won the bronze at the EuroBasket 2022, the country's first podium finish in the tournament since 2005.

== Venue ==
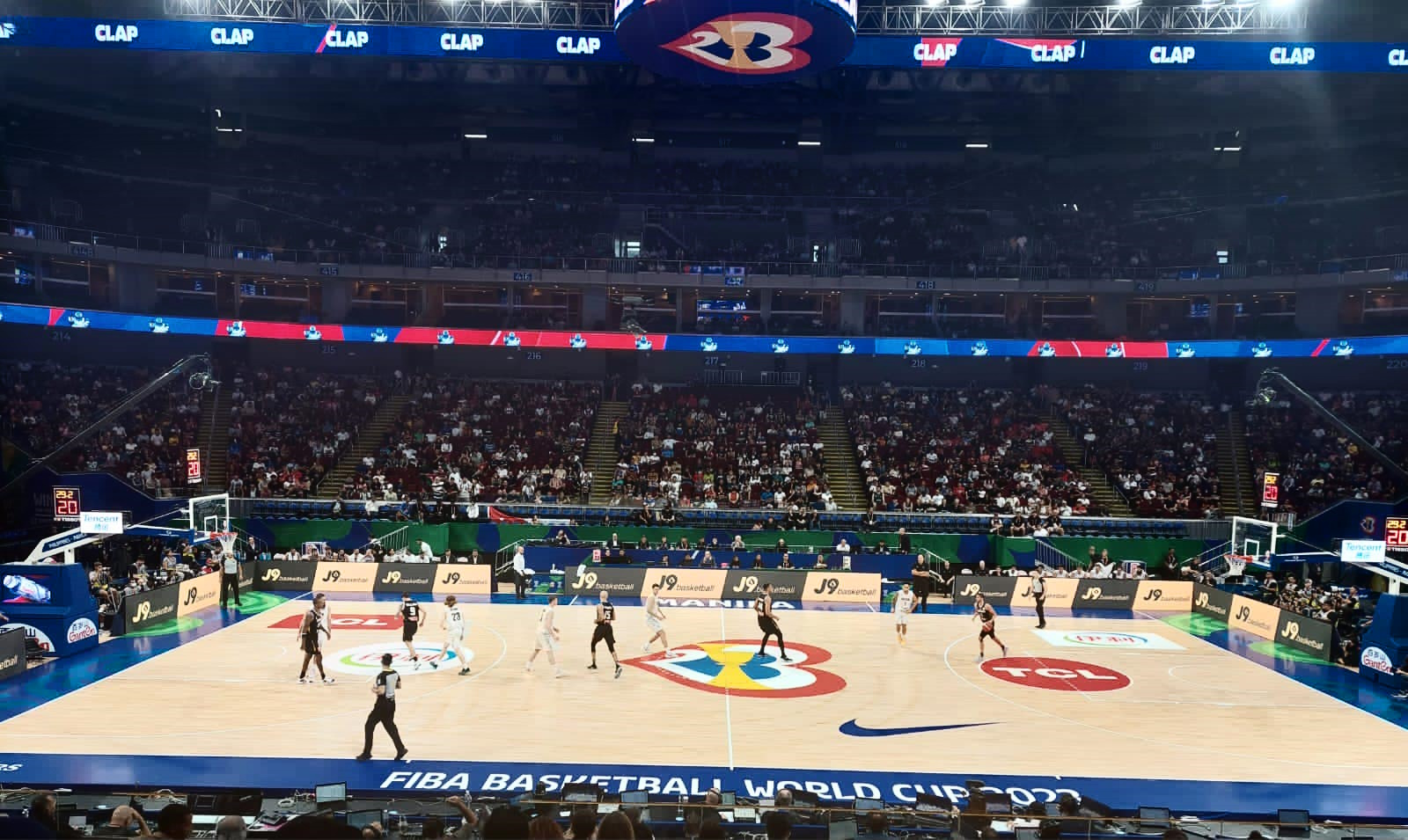
The SM Mall of Asia Arena in Pasay hosted the match

The final was played at the Mall of Asia Arena in Pasay, a city within Metro Manila, Philippines. The arena was one of the five proposed venues of the joint Philippine–Japanese–Indonesian World Cup bid, and was named the Final Phase venue on 28 April 2023. It hosted twelve group stage games, four second-round games, four 17–32 classification games, and all final phase games.

The Mall of Asia Arena, owned by SM Lifestyle Entertainment, which is under SM Prime Holdings, was built as part of the master plan for the SM Mall of Asia complex. The arena was designed by architecture firm Arquitectonica, and has a seating capacity of 15,000 but can host as much as 20,000 people in a full-house capacity. Construction began in 2010, and had its topping-off ceremony in September 2011. It hosted its first basketball event, a 2012 PBA Governors Cup semifinals game between the B-Meg Llamados and the Talk 'N Text Tropang Texters, on 7 July 2012.

The arena is one of the playing venues of the Philippine Basketball Association (PBA) and the country's major collegiate leagues (NCAA, UAAP). It has also hosted the 2013 FIBA Asia Championship, one of the 2016 FIBA World Olympic Qualifying Tournaments for Men, the basketball tournament of the 2019 Southeast Asian Games, and several 2019 and 2023 FIBA Basketball World Cup Asian Qualifiers games of the Philippines.

=== Venue change ===
The Philippine Arena was initially set to host the tournament's final phase.

The joint bid initially called for the 55,000-seater Philippine Arena in Bocaue, Bulacan to host the World Cup's Final Phase, from the quarter-finals to the World Cup Final. The arena previously hosted the 2018 FIBA 3x3 World Cup, three FIBA Basketball World Cup Asian Qualifiers games of the Philippines for 2019 and 2023, and the opening ceremony of the 2019 Southeast Asian Games.

On 28 April 2023, FIBA announced during its Central Board meeting that the venue would be changed to the Mall of Asia Arena in Pasay, citing logistical and transport issues, which were experienced in various events at the arena, including various concerts and the sixth and final window of the 2023 World Cup Asian Qualifiers. Instead, the Philippine Arena hosted the first two games of Group A on 25 August 2023: Angola vs. Italy and Dominican Republic vs. Philippines.

== Route to the final ==
Note: In all results below, the score of the finalist is given first.

Germany		Round	Serbia	
Opponent	Result	Round	Opponent	Result
Japan	81–63	Game 1	China	105–63
Australia	85–82	Game 2	Puerto Rico	94–77
Finland	101–75	Game 3	South Sudan	115–83
Georgia	100–73	Game 4	Italy	76–78
Slovenia	100–71	Game 5	Dominican Republic	112–79
Latvia	81–79	Quarter-finals	Lithuania	87–68
United States	113–111	Semi-finals	Canada	95–86

== Game ==
The game between Germany and Serbia was widely seen as a surprising final, as both teams were not favoured in their semi-final match-ups. In FIBA's media survey, none of the participants tipped Germany or Serbia as title winners, instead favouring record holders United States. The game was tightly contested in the first quarter, which finished with a 23–26 score. Serbia went on a run in the second quarter, and following a Bogdan Bogdanović step-back three-pointer the Serbs led by four points, 38–42. Germany managed to come back and the two teams went into halftime with the score tied at 47–47. It was only the second time a World Cup final had been tied at halftime. In the third quarter, Germany opened up a lead after going on a 15–4 run and began the final quarter with a 12-point lead. Serbia fought back, behind 13 points in the quarter from Aleksa Avramović. With 1:21 remaining and just a three-point lead, Germany's Isaac Bonga turned over the ball to Marko Gudurić, who missed a lay-up as he was fouled in the process. Following more free throws by Germany and Serbia, the game was 79–77, Germany, in the final minute. With just 21 seconds on the clock, it was Dennis Schröder driving lay-up that gave the Germans an 81–77 lead. In the following possession, Gudurić turned the ball over and Schröder converted two free-throws to seal Germany's first-ever World Cup title. Schröder had a game-high 28 points and hit nine of his seventeen attempted field goals. Franz Wagner contributed 19 points and 7 rebounds, while Avramović led Serbia in scoring with 21 points. Bogdanović finished with 17 points and 5 assists. Schröder was named the tournament's most valuable player after the game, and was also named to the All-Star Five along with Bogdanović.

10 September 2023
20:40

Boxscore

Germany	83–77	Serbia
Scoring by quarter: 23–26, 24–21, 22–10, 14–20
Pts: Schröder 28; Rebs: Voigtmann 8 Asts: Voigtmann 3		Pts: Avramović 21; Rebs: N. Jović 8 Asts: Bogdanović 5

Mall of Asia Arena, Pasay
Attendance: 12,022
Referees: Roberto Vázquez (PUR), Omar Bermúdez (MEX), Gatis Saliņš (LAT)

Starters:			Pts	Reb	Ast
PG	17	Dennis Schröder	28	2	2
SG	42	Andreas Obst	7	0	1
SF	9	Franz Wagner	19	7	2
PF	10	Daniel Theis	2	4	2
C	7	Johannes Voigtmann	12	8	3
Reserves:					
PG	0	Isaac Bonga	7	2	0
PG	4	Maodo Lô	0	1	1
SF	5	Niels Giffey	0	0	0
PF	13	Moritz Wagner	8	4	0
PG	21	Justus Hollatz	DNP		
PF	32	Johannes Thiemann	0	2	2
PG	44	David Krämer	DNP		
Head coach:
(Canada Basketball) Gordon Herbert

Germany	Serbia

Germany	Statistics	Serbia
20/33 (61%)	2-pt field goals	17/33 (52%)
7/22 (32%)	3-pt field goals	9/29 (31%)
22/25 (88%)	Free throws	16/19 (84%)
11	Offensive rebounds	12
24	Defensive rebounds	17
35	Total rebounds	29
13	Assists	14
14	Turnovers	12
5	Steals	9
1	Blocks	2
28	Fouls	25

Starters:			Pts	Reb	Ast
PG	24	Stefan Jović	3	0	0
SG	7	Bogdan Bogdanović	17	3	5
SF	13	Ognjen Dobrić	0	0	0
PF	5	Nikola Jović	9	8	1
C	33	Nikola Milutinov	2	4	4
Reserves:					
C	3	Filip Petrušev	10	4	0
SG	9	Vanja Marinković	9	1	0
C	14	Dušan Ristić	DNP		
SG	23	Marko Gudurić	4	3	2
SF	27	Dejan Davidovac	2	2	0
PF	28	Boriša Simanić	DNP		
PG	30	Aleksa Avramović	21	4	4
Head coach:
(Basketball Federation of Serbia) Svetislav Pešić

== Rosters ==
Germany

Germany men's national basketball team – 2023 FIBA Basketball World Cup roster
Players
Coaches

Pos.	No.	Name	Age – Date of birth	Height	Club	Ctr.
SF	0	Isaac Bonga	23 – 8 November 1999	2.03 m (6 ft 8 in)	Bayern Munich	(Germany)
PG	4	Maodo Lô	30 – 31 December 1992	1.91 m (6 ft 3 in)	Olimpia Milano	(Italy)
G/F	5	Niels Giffey	32 – 8 June 1991	2.00 m (6 ft 7 in)	Bayern Munich	(Germany)
C	7	Johannes Voigtmann	30 – 30 September 1992	2.11 m (6 ft 11 in)	Olimpia Milano	(Italy)
G/F	9	Franz Wagner	21 – 27 August 2001	2.08 m (6 ft 10 in)	Orlando Magic	(United States)
F/C	10	Daniel Theis	31 – 4 April 1992	2.03 m (6 ft 8 in)	Indiana Pacers	(United States)
F/C	13	Moritz Wagner	26 – 26 April 1997	2.11 m (6 ft 11 in)	Orlando Magic	(United States)
PG	17	Dennis Schröder (C)	29 – 15 September 1993	1.85 m (6 ft 1 in)	Toronto Raptors	(Canada)
PG	21	Justus Hollatz	22 – 21 April 2001	1.91 m (6 ft 3 in)	Anadolu Efes	(Turkey)
PF	32	Johannes Thiemann	29 – 9 February 1994	2.05 m (6 ft 9 in)	Alba Berlin	(Germany)
SG	42	Andreas Obst	27 – 13 July 1996	1.91 m (6 ft 3 in)	Bayern Munich	(Germany)
SG	44	David Krämer	26 – 14 January 1997	1.96 m (6 ft 5 in)	Covirán Granada	(Spain)

Head coach

- (Canada) / (Finland) Gordon Herbert

Assistant coach(es)

- (Germany) Klaus Perwas
- (United States) Bret Brielmaier

Legend

- (C) Team captain
- Club – describes last
  club before the tournament
- Age – describes age
  on 25 August 2023

Serbia

Serbia men's national basketball team – 2023 FIBA Basketball World Cup roster
Players
Coaches

Pos.	No.	Name	Age – Date of birth	Height	Club	Ctr.
C	3	Filip Petrušev	23 – 15 April 2000	2.11 m (6 ft 11 in)	Philadelphia 76ers	(United States)
PF	5	Nikola Jović	20 – 9 June 2003	2.08 m (6 ft 10 in)	Miami Heat	(United States)
SG	7	Bogdan Bogdanović (C)	31 – 18 August 1992	1.96 m (6 ft 5 in)	Atlanta Hawks	(United States)
SG	9	Vanja Marinković	23 – 1 May 2000	2.16 m (7 ft 1 in)	Saski Baskonia	(Spain)
SF	13	Ognjen Dobrić	28 – 27 October 1994	2.00 m (6 ft 7 in)	Virtus Bologna	(Italy)
C	14	Dušan Ristić	27 – 25 November 1995	2.14 m (7 ft 0 in)	Lenovo Tenerife	(Spain)
SG	23	Marko Gudurić	28 – 8 March 1995	1.96 m (6 ft 5 in)	Fenerbahçe Beko	(Turkey)
PG	24	Stefan Jović	32 – 3 November 1990	1.98 m (6 ft 6 in)	Basket Zaragoza	(Spain)
SF	27	Dejan Davidovac	28 – 17 January 1995	2.03 m (6 ft 8 in)	Crvena zvezda	(Serbia)
PF	28	Boriša Simanić	25 – 20 March 1998	2.11 m (6 ft 11 in)	Basket Zaragoza	(Spain)
PG	30	Aleksa Avramović	28 – 25 October 1994	1.92 m (6 ft 4 in)	Partizan Mozzart Bet	(Serbia)
C	33	Nikola Milutinov	28 – 30 December 1994	2.13 m (7 ft 0 in)	Olympiacos	(Greece)

Head coach

- (Serbia) Svetislav Pešić

Assistant coach(es)

- (Serbia) Nenad Jakovljević
- (Serbia) Saša Kosović
- (Serbia) Oliver Kostić
- (Serbia) Marko Marinović
- (Serbia) Ognjen Stojaković

Legend

- (C) Team captain
- Club – describes last
  club before the tournament
- Age – describes age
  on 25 August 2023
