= 2023 FIBA Basketball World Cup Group L =

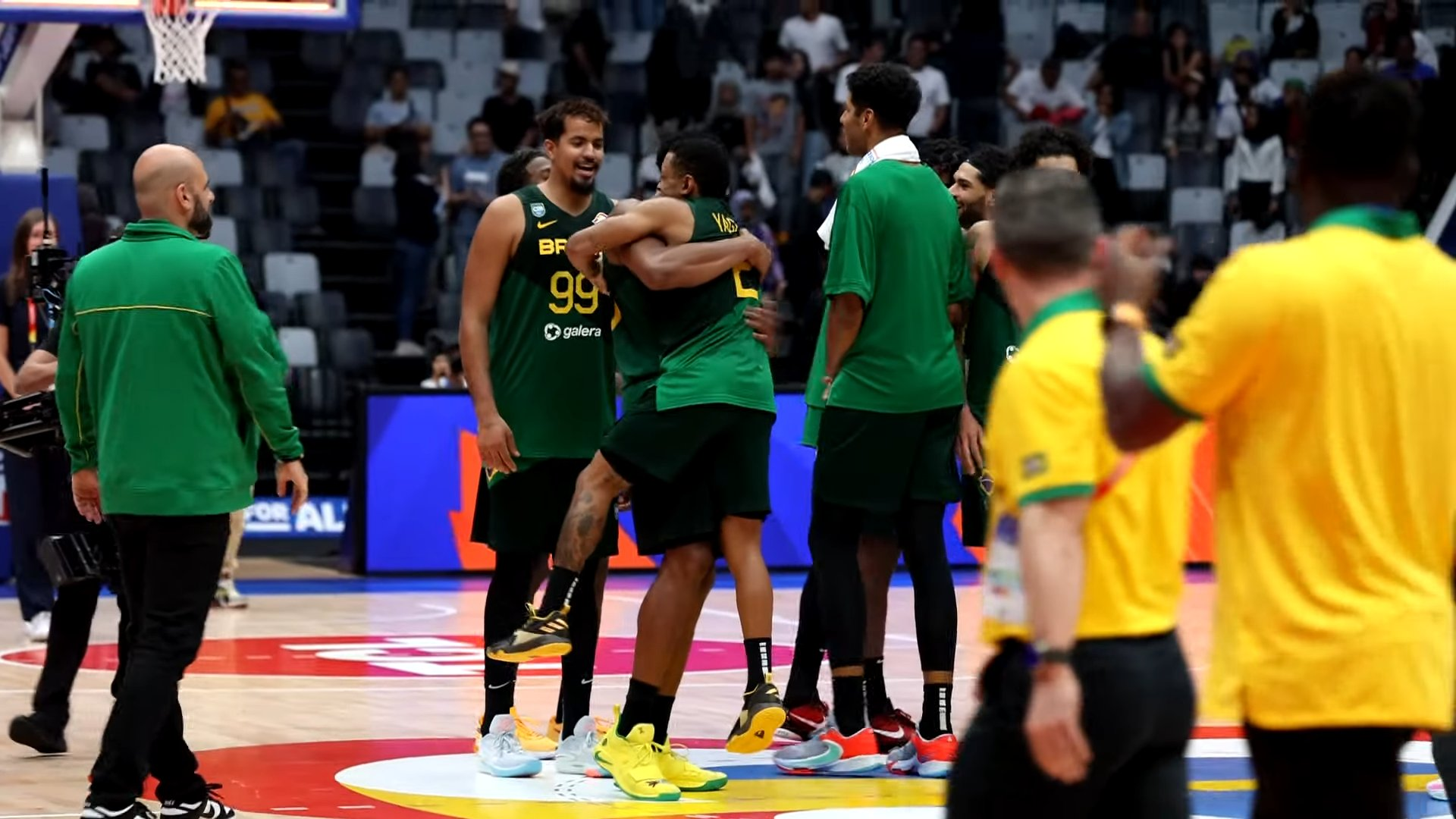
Brazil vs Canada.

Group L was one of four groups of the second round of the 2023 FIBA Basketball World Cup. It took place from 1 to 3 September 2023 and consisted of the top-two teams from Groups G and H. The results from the preliminary round were carried over. The teams were playing against the teams from the other group, with all games played at the Indonesia Arena, Jakarta, Indonesia. The top two teams advanced to the quarterfinals, the third placed team was classified 9 to 12 and the fourth placed team 13 to 16.

== Qualified teams ==
Group	Winner	Runner-up
G	Spain	Brazil
H	Canada	Latvia

== Standings ==
Pos	Team	Pld	W	L	PF	PA	PD	Pts	Qualification
1	Canada	5	4	1	477	367	+110	9 (Note: Canada 1–0 Latvia)	Quarter-finals
2	Latvia	5	4	1	450	410	+40	9	Quarter-finals
3	Spain	5	3	2	429	369	+60	8 (Note: Spain 1–0 Brazil)	
4	Brazil	5	3	2	420	401	+19	8	

Source: FIBA
Rules for classification: Tiebreakers

== Games ==
All times are local (UTC+7).

=== Spain vs. Latvia ===
This was the first game between Spain and Latvia at the World Cup. The Spanish went 2–0 in their head-to-head matchups in the second round of the 2019 FIBA Basketball World Cup European Qualifiers.

1 September 2023
16:45

Boxscore

Spain	69–74	Latvia
Scoring by quarter: 16–17, 16–12, 26–18, 11–27
Pts: W. Hernangómez 14; Rebs: Claver, J. Hernangómez 5 Asts: Llull 7		Pts: Dāv. Bertāns 16; Rebs: R. Kurucs 8 Asts: Žagars 5

Indonesia Arena, Jakarta
Attendance: 7,117
Referees: Roberto Vázquez (PUR), Aleksandar Glišić (SRB), Juan Fernández (ARG)

=== Canada vs. Brazil ===
This was the sixth game between Canada and Brazil in the World Cup. The Braziians won all of the first five games between the two teams, the last one being in 1978. The Brazilians also won in the semi-finals of the 2022 FIBA AmeriCup, which was the last competitive game between the two teams.

1 September 2023
20:30

Boxscore

Canada	65–69	Brazil
Scoring by quarter: 13–16, 24–11, 15–18, 13–24
Pts: Gilgeous-Alexander 23; Rebs: Olynyk 7 Asts: Alexander-Walker 3		Pts: Caboclo 19; Rebs: Caboclo 13; Asts: Yago 10

Indonesia Arena, Jakarta
Attendance: 8,934
Referees: Julio Anaya (PAN), Jenna Reneau (USA), Johnny Batista (PUR)

=== Brazil vs. Latvia ===
This was the first competitive game between Brazil and Latvia.

3 September 2023
16:45

Boxscore

Brazil	84–104	Latvia
Scoring by quarter: 20–22, 22–23, 21–36, 21–23
Pts: Caboclo 20; Rebs: Caboclo, Dias 7 Asts: Huertas 9		Pts: Gražulis 24; Rebs: R. Kurucs 5 Asts: Zoriks 6

Indonesia Arena, Jakarta
Attendance: 10,412
Referees: Roberto Vázquez (PUR), Aleksandar Glišić (SRB), Johnny Batista (PUR)

=== Spain vs. Canada ===
This was the sixth game between Spain and Canada in the World Cup. The Spanish won in 2010, which was also the last competitive game between the two teams.

3 September 2023
20:30

Boxscore

Spain	85–88	Canada
Scoring by quarter: 21–21, 27–17, 25–23, 12–27
Pts: W. Hernangómez 25; Rebs: W. Hernangómez 6 Asts: Fernández, Núñez 7		Pts: Gilgeous-Alexander 30; Rebs: three players 5 Asts: Gilgeous-Alexander 7

Indonesia Arena, Jakarta
Attendance: 12,493
Referees: Julio Anaya (PAN), Juan Fernández (ARG), Jenna Reneau (USA)
