= 2023 FIBA Basketball World Cup Group H =

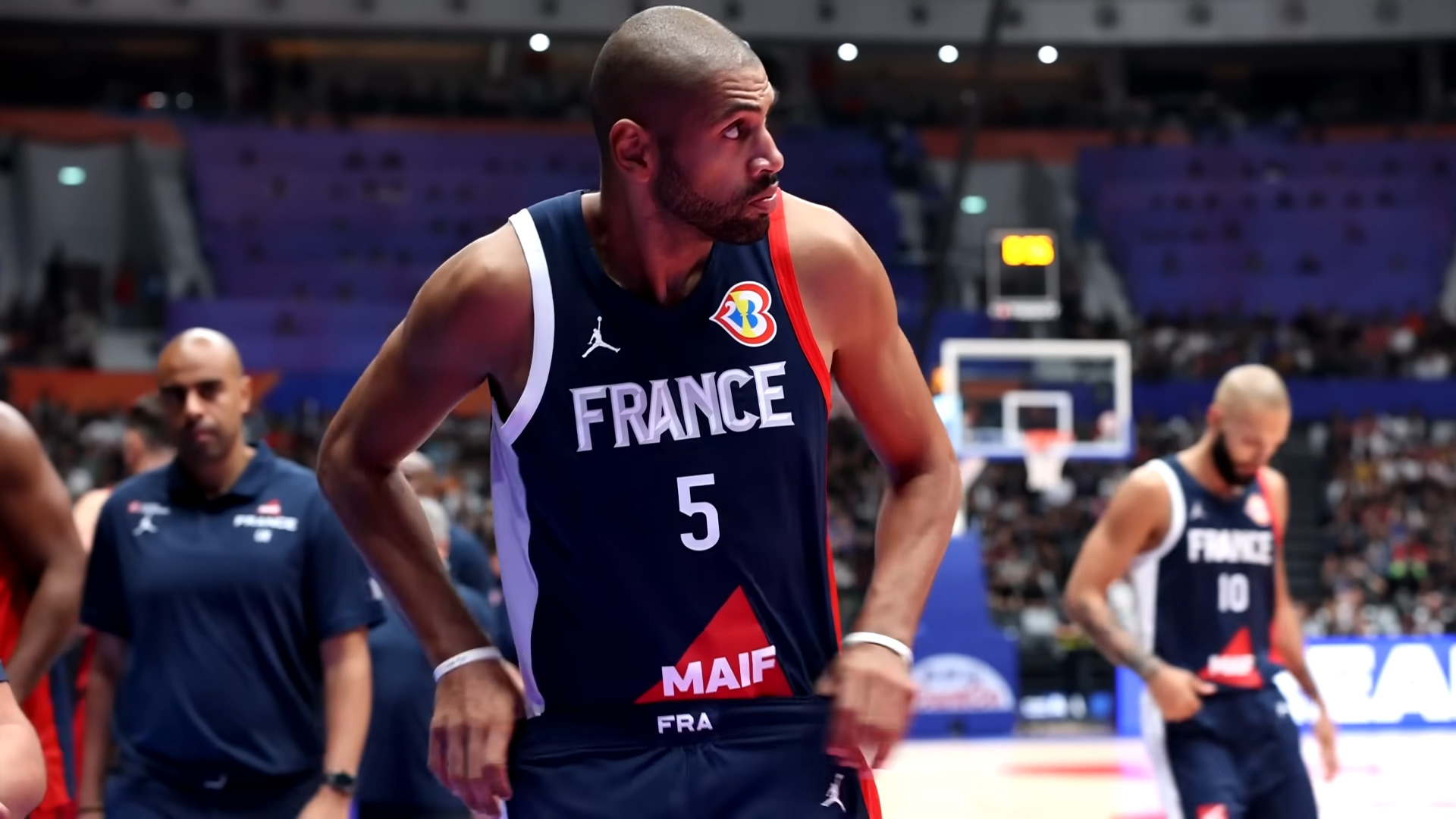
France national team.

Group H was one of eight groups of the preliminary round of the 2023 FIBA Basketball World Cup. It took place from 25 to 29 August 2023, and consisted of Canada, France, Latvia, and Lebanon. Each team played each other once, for a total of three games per team, with all games played at the Indonesia Arena, Jakarta, Indonesia. The top two teams advanced to the second round and the bottom two teams qualified for the classification rounds.

== Teams ==
Team	Qualification		Appearance			Best performance	WR
Team	As	Date	Last	Total	Streak	Best performance	WR
Canada	Americas Group E top three	10 November 2022	2019	15	2	6th place (1978, 1982)	15
Latvia	European Group I top three	11 November 2022	—N/a	1	1	Debut	29
Lebanon	Asian Group E top three	29 August 2022	2010	4	1	16th place (2002)	42
France	European Group K top three	14 November 2022	2019	9	5	3rd place (2014, 2019)	5

== Standings ==
Pos	Team	Pld	W	L	PF	PA	PD	Pts	Qualification
1	Canada	3	3	0	324	213	+111	6	Second round
2	Latvia	3	2	1	272	257	+15	5	Second round
3	France	3	1	2	236	262	−26	4	17th–32nd classification
4	Lebanon	3	0	3	222	322	−100	3	17th–32nd classification

Source: FIBA
Rules for classification: Tiebreakers

== Games ==
All times are local (UTC+7).

=== Latvia vs. Lebanon ===
This was the first competitive game between Latvia and Lebanon.

25 August 2023
16:15

Boxscore

Latvia	109–70	Lebanon
Scoring by quarter: 27–17, 28–13, 27–18, 27–22
Pts: Dai. Bertāns 20; Rebs: Gražulis, Šmits 7 Asts: Žagars 11		Pts: El Darwich 19; Rebs: El Darwich 5 Asts: Arakji 8

Indonesia Arena, Jakarta
Attendance: 5,834
Referees: Julio Anaya (PAN), Scott Beker (AUS), Jenna Reneau (USA)

=== Canada vs. France ===
This was the third game between Canada and France in the World Cup. The French won the first meeting in 2010 and won in the final of the 2016 FIBA World Olympic Qualifying Tournament in Manila.

25 August 2023
20:30

Boxscore

Canada	95–65	France
Scoring by quarter: 14–18, 29–22, 25–8, 27–17
Pts: Gilgeous-Alexander 27; Rebs: Gilgeous-Alexander 13; Asts: Gilgeous-Alexander 6		Pts: Fournier 21; Rebs: Gobert 9 Asts: Okobo 4

Indonesia Arena, Jakarta
Attendance: 12,091
Referees: Roberto Vázquez (PUR), Johnny Batista (PUR), Gvidas Gedvilas (LTU)

=== Lebanon vs. Canada ===
This was the second game between Lebanon and Canada in the World Cup. The Lebanese won the first meeting in 2010, which was also the last competitive game between the two teams.

27 August 2023
16:45

Boxscore

Lebanon	73–128	Canada
Scoring by quarter: 13–29, 17–37, 18–34, 25–28
Pts: Spellman 16; Rebs: three players 3 Asts: Arakji 5		Pts: Barrett 17; Rebs: Olynyk 8 Asts: Bell-Haynes 8

Indonesia Arena, Jakarta
Attendance: 10,180
Referees: Roberto Vázquez (PUR), Jenna Reneau (USA), Daigo Urushima (JPN)

=== France vs. Latvia ===
This was the first game between France and Latvia in the World Cup. The French won in the quarter-finals of EuroBasket 2015, which was also the last competitive game between the two teams. Latvia took their first lead with 37.7 seconds left in the game.

27 August 2023
20:30

Boxscore

France	86–88	Latvia
Scoring by quarter: 33–26, 20–23, 21–13, 12–26
Pts: Fournier 27; Rebs: Gobert 7 Asts: De Colo 8		Pts: Žagars 22; Rebs: R. Kurucs 5 Asts: Žagars 5

Indonesia Arena, Jakarta
Attendance: 9,628
Referees: Julio Anaya (PAN), Juan Fernández (ARG), Andrés Bartel (URU)

=== Lebanon vs. France ===
This was the third game between Lebanon and France in the World Cup. The Lebanese won the first meeting in 2006 while the French won their second encounter in 2010.

29 August 2023
16:45

Boxscore

Lebanon	79–85	France
Scoring by quarter: 20–19, 17–19, 22–20, 20–27
Pts: Arakji 29; Rebs: Haidar, Zeinoun 6 Asts: Arakji, El Darwich 4		Pts: Fournier 17; Rebs: Cordinier 5 Asts: Okobo 5

Indonesia Arena, Jakarta
Attendance: 6,549
Referees: Aleksandar Glišić (SRB), Yevgeniy Mikheyev (KAZ), Daigo Urushima (JPN)

=== Canada vs. Latvia ===
This was the first competitive game between Canada and Latvia.

29 August 2023
20:30

Boxscore

Canada	101–75	Latvia
Scoring by quarter: 13–23, 30–19, 24–15, 34–18
Pts: Gilgeous-Alexander 27; Rebs: Ejim 7 Asts: Gilgeous-Alexander 6		Pts: Gražulis 16; Rebs: R. Kurucs 10; Asts: Šķēle 6

Indonesia Arena, Jakarta
Attendance: 11,186
Referees: Juan Fernández (ARG), Jenna Reneau (USA), Johnny Batista (PUR)
