= 2023 FIBA Basketball World Cup final round =

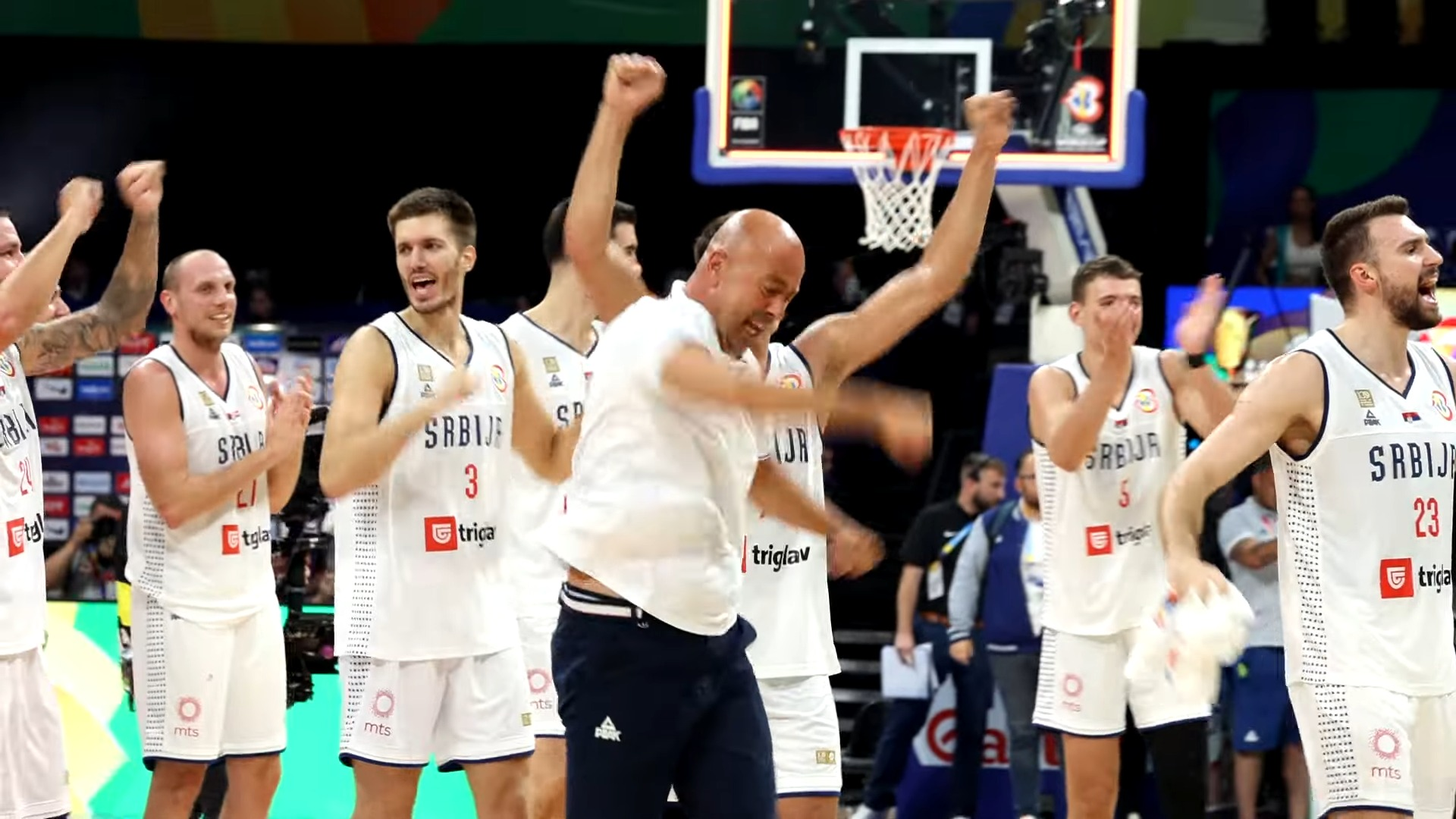
Serbia v. Canada

The final round was the knockout stage of the 2023 FIBA Basketball World Cup. It took place from 5 to 10 September 2023 and consisted of the top-two teams from Groups I, J, K and L. The round was played in a single-elimination tournament, with all games played at the Mall of Asia Arena, Pasay, Philippines. Teams that lost in the quarter-finals were relegated to the classification stage for places 5 to 8.

== Qualified teams ==
Group	Winner	Runner-up
I	Italy	Serbia
J	Lithuania	United States
K	Germany	Slovenia
L	Canada	Latvia

== Bracket ==
Fifth place
9 September
Latvia	98
Lithuania	63
Seventh place
9 September
Italy	85
Slovenia	89

5th–8th classification
7 September
Italy	82
Latvia	87
7 September
Lithuania	100
Slovenia	84

Quarter-finals
5 September
Italy	63
United States	100
6 September
Germany	81
Latvia	79
5 September
Lithuania	68
Serbia	87
6 September
Canada	100
Slovenia	89

Semi-finals
8 September
United States	111
Germany	113
8 September
Serbia	95
Canada	86

Final
10 September
Germany	83
Serbia	77
Third place game
10 September
United States	118
Canada (OT)	127

== Quarter-finals ==
All times are local (UTC+8).

=== Lithuania vs. Serbia ===
This was the second game between Lithuania and Serbia in the World Cup. The Lithuanians won the first meeting in 2010. The Lithuanians also won in the semi-finals of EuroBasket 2015, which was the last competitive game between the two teams.

5 September 2023
16:45

Boxscore

Lithuania	68–87	Serbia
Scoring by quarter: 25–24, 13–25, 17–24, 13–14
Pts: Sedekerskis 14; Rebs: Sedekerskis 9 Asts: Jokubaitis 9		Pts: Bogdanović 21; Rebs: Petrušev 6 Asts: Gudurić 6

Mall of Asia Arena, Pasay
Attendance: 6,223
Referees: Omar Bermúdez (MEX), Mārtiņš Kozlovskis (LAT), Johnny Batista (PUR)

=== Italy vs. United States ===
This was the ninth game between Italy and the United States in the World Cup. The Americans won six of eight World Cup matches including one in 2006, which was also the last competitive game between the two teams.

5 September 2023
20:40

Boxscore

Italy	63–100	United States
Scoring by quarter: 14–24, 10–22, 20–37, 19–17
Pts: Fontecchio 18; Rebs: Melli 9 Asts: Tonut 5		Pts: Bridges 24; Rebs: Bridges, Portis 7 Asts: Haliburton 5

Mall of Asia Arena, Pasay
Attendance: 9,764
Referees: Julio Anaya (PAN), Ademir Zurapović (BIH), Juan Fernández (ARG)

=== Germany vs. Latvia ===
This was the first game between Germany and Latvia at the World Cup. The Germans won in the first round of EuroBasket 2011, which was the last competitive game between the two teams.

6 September 2023
16:45

Boxscore

Germany	81–79	Latvia
Scoring by quarter: 13–16, 23–18, 26–25, 19–20
Pts: F. Wagner 16; Rebs: Theis, F. Wagner 8 Asts: Schröder 4		Pts: Žagars 24; Rebs: R. Kurucs 10; Asts: Žagars 8

Mall of Asia Arena, Pasay
Attendance: 7,584
Referees: Antonio Conde (ESP), Yohan Rosso (FRA), Martin Vulić (CRO)

=== Canada vs. Slovenia ===
This was the first game between Canada and Slovenia in the World Cup. The Slovenians won in the group stage of the 2008 FIBA Men's Olympic Qualifying Tournament, which was the first and only competitive game between the two teams.

6 September 2023
20:30

Boxscore

Canada	100–89	Slovenia
Scoring by quarter: 26–24, 24–26, 30–21, 20–18
Pts: Gilgeous-Alexander 31; Rebs: Gilgeous-Alexander 10; Asts: Gilgeous-Alexander, Olynyk 4		Pts: Dončić 26; Rebs: Tobey 6 Asts: Dončić 5

Mall of Asia Arena, Pasay
Attendance: 11,710
Referees: Roberto Vázquez (PUR), Manuel Mazzoni (ITA), Gatis Saliņš (LAT)

== Classification semi-finals ==
=== Italy vs. Latvia ===
This was the first game between Italy and Latvia at the World Cup. The Italians won in the first round of EuroBasket 2011, which was the last competitive game between the two teams.

7 September 2023
16:45

Boxscore

Italy	82–87	Latvia
Scoring by quarter: 26–18, 16–28, 18–21, 22–20
Pts: Datome 20; Rebs: Melli 9 Asts: Spissu 7		Pts: Gražulis 28; Rebs: Gražulis 6 Asts: Šķēle 9

Mall of Asia Arena, Pasay
Attendance: 4,579
Referees: Ademir Zurapović (BIH), Takaki Kato (JPN), Blanca Burns (USA)

=== Lithuania vs. Slovenia ===
This was the second game between Lithuania and Slovenia in the World Cup. The Lithuanians won the first meeting in 2014. The Slovenians won in the group stage of EuroBasket 2022, which was the last competitive game between the two teams.

7 September 2023
20:30

Boxscore

Lithuania	100–84	Slovenia
Scoring by quarter: 33–21, 20–22, 22–20, 25–21
Pts: Valančiūnas 24; Rebs: Valančiūnas 12; Asts: Kariniauskas 10		Pts: Dončić 29; Rebs: Tobey 9 Asts: Dragić 3

Mall of Asia Arena, Pasay
Attendance: 11,003
Referees: Matthew Kallio (CAN), Omar Bermúdez (MEX), Johnny Batista (PUR)

== Semi-finals ==
=== Serbia vs. Canada ===
This was the first competitive game between Serbia and Canada.

8 September 2023
16:45

Boxscore

Serbia	95–86	Canada
Scoring by quarter: 23–15, 29–24, 23–24, 20–23
Pts: Bogdanović 23; Rebs: Milutinov 10; Asts: S. Jović 5		Pts: Barrett 23; Rebs: five players 3 Asts: Gilgeous-Alexander 9

Mall of Asia Arena, Pasay
Attendance: 8,630
Referees: Yohan Rosso (FRA), Julio Anaya (PAN), Manuel Mazzoni (ITA)

=== United States vs. Germany ===
This was the fourth game between the United States and Germany in the World Cup. The Americans won the first three meetings in 1986, 2002, and 2006. The Americans also won in the preliminary round of the 2008 Olympic tournament, which was the last competitive game between the two teams.

8 September 2023
20:40

Boxscore

United States	111–113	Germany
Scoring by quarter: 31–33, 29–26, 24–35, 27–19
Pts: Edwards 23; Rebs: Edwards 8 Asts: Haliburton 8		Pts: Obst 24; Rebs: Theis, Voigtmann 7 Asts: Schröder 9

Mall of Asia Arena, Pasay
Attendance: 11,011
Referees: Antonio Conde (ESP), Boris Krejič (SLO), Gatis Saliņš (LAT)

== Seventh place game ==
This was the second game between Italy and Slovenia in the World Cup. The Italians won the first meeting in 2006. The Slovenians won in the second round of EuroBasket 2013, which was the last competitive game between the two teams.

9 September 2023
16:45

Boxscore

Italy	85–89	Slovenia
Scoring by quarter: 18–15, 23–27, 19–28, 25–19
Pts: Spissu 22; Rebs: Polonara 7 Asts: Melli 5		Pts: Dončić 29; Rebs: Dončić 10; Asts: Dončić 8

Mall of Asia Arena, Pasay
Attendance: 10,775
Referees: Ademir Zurapović (BIH), Mārtiņš Kozlovskis (LAT), Martin Vulić (CRO)

== Fifth place game ==
This was the first game between Latvia and Lithuania at the World Cup. The Lithuanians won in the group stage of EuroBasket 2015, which was the last competitive game between the two teams.

9 September 2023
20:30

Boxscore

Latvia	98–63	Lithuania
Scoring by quarter: 28–20, 21–18, 28–9, 21–16
Pts: A. Kurucs 20; Rebs: four players 6 Asts: Žagars 17		Pts: Jokubaitis 16; Rebs: Sedekerskis 10; Asts: Brazdeikis 3

Mall of Asia Arena, Pasay
Attendance: 9,440
Referees: Manuel Mazzoni (ITA), Blanca Burns (USA), Johnny Batista (PUR)

== Third place game ==
This was the eighth game between the United States and Canada in the World Cup. The Americans won all of the first seven meetings between the two teams, the last one being in 1986. The Americans also won in the third place game of the 2022 FIBA AmeriCup, which was the last competitive game between the two teams.

10 September 2023
16:30

Boxscore

United States	118–127 (OT)	Canada
Scoring by quarter: 25–34, 31–24, 26–33, 29–20, Overtime: 7–16
Pts: Edwards 24; Rebs: Bridges 9 Asts: Haliburton 7		Pts: Brooks 39; Rebs: Barrett, Powell 7 Asts: Gilgeous-Alexander 12

Mall of Asia Arena, Pasay
Attendance: 10,666
Referees: Julio Anaya (PAN), Takaki Kato (JPN), Antonio Conde (ESP)

== Final ==
This was the second game between Germany and Serbia in the World Cup. The Germans won the first meeting in 2010. The Germans also went 2–0 in their head-to-head matchups in the first round of the 2019 FIBA Basketball World Cup European Qualifiers.

10 September 2023
20:40

Boxscore

Germany	83–77	Serbia
Scoring by quarter: 23–26, 24–21, 22–10, 14–20
Pts: Schröder 28; Rebs: Voigtmann 8 Asts: Voigtmann 3		Pts: Avramović 21; Rebs: N. Jović 8 Asts: Bogdanović 5

Mall of Asia Arena, Pasay
Attendance: 12,022
Referees: Roberto Vázquez (PUR), Omar Bermúdez (MEX), Gatis Saliņš (LAT)
