= Gražulis =

- Lithuanian surname
- m.: Gražulis
- f.: (unmarried): Gražulytė
- f.: (married): Gražulienė

Gražulis is a Lithuanian language family name. Notable people with the surname include:

- Andrejs Gražulis (born 1993), Latvian basketballer
- Thomas P. Grazulis (born 1942), American meteorologist
- Petras Gražulis (born 1958), Lithuanian politician, MP
