= 2023 Serbia FIBA Basketball World Cup team =

Serbia
- Flag of Serbia
- President: Predrag Danilović
- Head coach: Svetislav Pešić
- Preliminary round: Group B Winners
- Second round: Group I Runners-up
- Playoffs: Runners-up
- PIR leader: Bogdan Bogdanović 21.6
- Scoring leader: Bogdan Bogdanović 19.1
- Rebounding leader: Nikola Milutinov 8.4
- Assists leader: Stefan Jović 5.6
- Biggest win: +42; 105–63 China (26 August 2023)
- Biggest defeat: –6; 77–83 Germany (10 September 2023)
Home	Away
- All statistics correct as of July 24, 2023.

The 2023 Serbia FIBA Basketball World Cup team represented Serbia at the 2023 FIBA Basketball World Cup in Philippines, Japan and Indonesia.

Serbia qualified for the World Cup by taking the 2nd place in the European Second Round Group I. The team is coached by Svetislav Pešić, with assistant coaches Oliver Kostić, Marko Marinović, Saša Kosović, Ognjen Stojaković and Nenad Jakovljević. The Serbian team won the fifth place at the previous World Cup.

This was the 4th appearance of Serbia at the FIBA Basketball World Cup; however, FIBA considers Serbia as the successor team of FR Yugoslavia and Serbia and Montenegro who themselves qualified on three occasions. Serbia's best result is 2nd place in 2014; however, FIBA considers Serbia as the successor team of FR Yugoslavia who won 2 World Cups (1998, 2002).

== Timeline ==
- 24 July: 20-man roster announced
- 28 July: The players gathering in Belgrade
- 1 August – 21 August: Exhibition games
- 24 August : Final 12-man roster announced
- 25 August – 10 September: 2023 FIBA Basketball World Cup

== Qualification ==
First round

Pos	Team	Pld	W	L	PF	PA	PD	Pts	Qualification
1	Latvia	6	5	1	475	422	+53	11	Second round (Group I)
2	Belgium	6	4	2	460	392	+68	10	Second round (Group I)
3	Serbia	6	3	3	448	439	+9	9	Second round (Group I)
4	Slovakia	6	0	6	376	506	−130	6	

Source: FIBA
Rules for classification: 1) Points; 2) Head-to-head results; 3) Points difference; 4) Points scored.

Second round

Pos	Team	Pld	W	L	PF	PA	PD	Pts	Qualification
1	Latvia	10	9	1	807	707	+100	19	2023 FIBA Basketball World Cup
2	Serbia	10	6	4	825	803	+22	16 (Note: Serbia 192–191 Greece)	2023 FIBA Basketball World Cup
3	Greece	10	6	4	775	764	+11	16	2023 FIBA Basketball World Cup
4	Turkey	10	4	6	782	742	+40	14 (Note: Turkey 2–0 Belgium)	
5	Belgium	10	4	6	679	717	−38	14	
6	Great Britain	10	1	9	697	832	−135	11	

Source: FIBA
Rules for classification: 1) Points; 2) Head-to-head results; 3) Points difference; 4) Points scored.

== Roster ==
Serbia men's national basketball team – 2023 FIBA Basketball World Cup roster
Players
Coaches

Pos.	No.	Name	Age – Date of birth	Height	Club	Ctr.
C	3	Filip Petrušev	23 – 15 April 2000	2.11 m (6 ft 11 in)	Philadelphia 76ers	(United States)
PF	5	Nikola Jović	20 – 9 June 2003	2.08 m (6 ft 10 in)	Miami Heat	(United States)
SG	7	Bogdan Bogdanović (C)	31 – 18 August 1992	1.96 m (6 ft 5 in)	Atlanta Hawks	(United States)
SG	9	Vanja Marinković	26 – 9 January 1997	1.98 m (6 ft 6 in)	Saski Baskonia	(Spain)
SF	13	Ognjen Dobrić	28 – 27 October 1994	2.00 m (6 ft 7 in)	Virtus Bologna	(Italy)
C	14	Dušan Ristić	27 – 25 November 1995	2.14 m (7 ft 0 in)	Lenovo Tenerife	(Spain)
SG	23	Marko Gudurić	28 – 8 March 1995	1.96 m (6 ft 5 in)	Fenerbahçe Beko	(Turkey)
PG	24	Stefan Jović	32 – 3 November 1990	1.98 m (6 ft 6 in)	Basket Zaragoza	(Spain)
SF	27	Dejan Davidovac	28 – 17 January 1995	2.03 m (6 ft 8 in)	Crvena zvezda	(Serbia)
PF	28	Boriša Simanić	25 – 20 March 1998	2.11 m (6 ft 11 in)	Basket Zaragoza	(Spain)
PG	30	Aleksa Avramović	28 – 25 October 1994	1.92 m (6 ft 4 in)	Partizan Mozzart Bet	(Serbia)
C	33	Nikola Milutinov	28 – 30 December 1994	2.13 m (7 ft 0 in)	Olympiacos	(Greece)

Head coach

- (Serbia) Svetislav Pešić

Assistant coach(es)

- (Serbia) Nenad Jakovljević
- (Serbia) Saša Kosović
- (Serbia) Oliver Kostić
- (Serbia) Marko Marinović
- (Serbia) Ognjen Stojaković

Legend

- (C) Team captain
- Club – describes last
  club before the tournament
- Age – describes age
  on 25 August 2023

=== Earlier candidates ===
The following were candidates to make the team:

Earlier candidates
Player	Team	Added	Removed	Reason
Aleksej Pokuševski	(United States) Oklahoma City Thunder	24 July 2023	28 July 2023	Injured
Ognjen Jaramaz	(Germany) Bayern Munich	24 July 2023	31 July 2023	Injured
Nemanja Nedović	(Serbia) Crvena zvezda Meridianbet	24 July 2023	11 August 2023	Withdrew
Alen Smailagić	(Serbia) Partizan Mozzart Bet	24 July 2023	15 August 2023	Injured
Uroš Trifunović	(Serbia) Partizan Mozzart Bet	24 July 2023	15 August 2023	Injured
Dušan Beslać	(Serbia) Vojvodina	24 July 2023	16 August 2023	Roster cut
Nikola Topić	(Serbia) OKK Beograd	24 July 2023	16 August 2023	Roster cut
Aleksa Radanov	(Greece) Peristeri	24 July 2023	22 August 2023	Roster cut

== Exhibition games ==
Before the World Cup Serbia will play eight exhibition games. First set will include three closed games against Bosnia and Herzegovina and Poland in Belgrade on 1 and 3 August, and against Montenegro in Podgorica on 5 August. After them team will move to Greece in order to play in 2023 Acropolis of Athens Tournament against Greece on 8 August and Italy on 9 August. After returning from Greece Serbia will play another exhibition game in Belgrade, on 16 August, against Puerto Rico. At the end of August team will leave for China where they will play their last two exhibition games against China on 20 August and Brazil on 21 August.

1 August 2023

Serbia	vs.	Bosnia and Herzegovina
Played behind closed doors

Belgrade

3 August 2023

Serbia	vs.	Poland
Played behind closed doors

Belgrade

5 August 2023

Montenegro	vs.	Serbia
Canceled

Podgorica

2023 Acropolis International Basketball Tournament

8 August 2023

Report

Greece	64–71	Serbia
Scoring by quarter: 13–16, 22–23, 14–18, 15–14
Pts: Rogkavopoulos 19; Rebs: Mitoglou 10; Asts: Walkup 10		Pts: Bogdanović 15; Rebs: Milutinov 12; Asts: Bogdanović 5

O.A.C.A. Olympic Hall, Athens
Referees: Tsolakos, Somos, Tsimpouris

9 August 2023

Report

Italy	89–88	Serbia
Scoring by quarter: 19–32, 25–15, 26–23, 19–18
Pts: Fontecchio 13; Rebs: Polonara 11; Asts: Severini 5		Pts: N. Jović 18; Rebs: N. Jović 7 Asts: Gudurić 6

O.A.C.A. Olympic Hall, Athens
Referees: Papapetrou, Tziopanos, Agrafiotis

16 August 2023

Report

Serbia	110–75	Puerto Rico
Scoring by quarter: 26–13, 39–12, 24–21, 21–29
Pts: Dobrić 23; Rebs: N. Jović 8 Asts: S. Jović 11		Pts: Waters 11; Rebs: Romero 6 Asts: Thompson 4

Štark Arena, Belgrade
Attendance: 12,526
Referees: Glišić, Jevtović, Pešić

20 August 2023

Report

China	64–87	Serbia
Scoring by quarter: 12–23, 16–20, 23–22, 13–22
Pts: M. Hu 14; Rebs: Z. Wang, Q. Zhou 6 Asts: J. Zhao 6		Pts: Bogdanović 19; Rebs: Petrušev 8

Shenzhen

21 August 2023

Brazil	85–89	Serbia
Scoring by quarter: 20–21, 18–24, 21–19, 26–25
Pts: Benite 17; Rebs: Caboclo 8 Asts: Raul Neto 7		Pts: Petrušev 17; Rebs: Petrušev 5 Asts: S. Jović 4

Shenzhen

== Tournament ==
The 2023 FIBA Basketball World Cup is the 19th tournament of the FIBA Basketball World Cup championship that is organized by FIBA.

=== Preliminary round ===
Serbia was drawn into Group B with South Sudan, China, and the Puerto Rico and will play all of its group phase matches in Quezon City at the Araneta Coliseum from 26 to 30 August.

Pos	Team	Pld	W	L	PF	PA	PD	Pts	Qualification
1	Serbia	3	3	0	314	223	+91	6	Second round
2	Puerto Rico	3	2	1	285	279	+6	5	Second round
3	South Sudan	3	1	2	268	285	−17	4	17th–32nd classification
4	China	3	0	3	221	301	−80	3	17th–32nd classification

Source: FIBA
Rules for classification: Tiebreakers

Results by round

Round	1	2	3
Ground	H	A	A
Result	W	W	W
Position	1	1	1

Last updated: 30 August 2023.
Source: Competitive matches
Ground: A = Away; H = Home; R = Rest. Result: L = Loss; W = Win; R = Rest; P = Postponed.

==== China ====
This will be the first game between Serbia and China in the World Cup. The Serbians won two of the three Olympic Games matches: 1996 as Yugoslavia and 2016 as Serbia. The Chinese won in the 2004 Olympics.

26 August 2023
20:00 (UTC+8)

Boxscore

Serbia	105–63	China
Scoring by quarter: 25–14, 30–20, 22–13, 28–16
Pts: Bogdanović, Marinković 14; Rebs: Milutinov, Ristić 6 Asts: Gudurić, S. Jović 6		Pts: Zhao R. 17; Rebs: Cui, Zhou 5 Asts: Zhao J. 6

Araneta Coliseum, Quezon City
Attendance: 7,292
Referees: Yohan Rosso (FRA), Andris Aunkrogers (LAT), Rabah Noujaim (LBN)

==== Puerto Rico ====
This will be the second game between Puerto Rico and Serbia in the World Cup. The Serbians won their last meeting in 2019 and also won in the final of the 2016 FIBA Men's Olympic Qualifying Tournament and in the semi-finals of the 2020 edition of the said tournament.

28 August 2023
20:00

Boxscore

Puerto Rico	77–94	Serbia
Scoring by quarter: 15–27, 12–30, 31–18, 19–19
Pts: Piñeiro 14; Rebs: Conditt 11; Asts: Waters 9		Pts: Bogdanović, N. Jović 17; Rebs: Milutinov 15; Asts: S. Jović 6

Araneta Coliseum, Quezon City
Attendance: 2,944
Referees: Yohan Rosso (FRA), Leandro Zalazar (ARG), Carlos Peralta (ECU)

==== South Sudan ====
This will be the first competitive game between South Sudan and Serbia.

30 August 2023
16:00

Boxscore

South Sudan	83–115	Serbia
Scoring by quarter: 20–30, 19–26, 26–27, 18–32
Pts: Jok 21; Rebs: Omot 5 Asts: Jones 6		Pts: N. Jović 25; Rebs: Milutinov 10; Asts: S. Jović 13

Araneta Coliseum, Quezon City
Referees: Yohan Rosso (FRA), Kerem Baki (TUR), Rabah Noujaim (LBN)

=== Second round ===
Serbia qualified for the Group I where it will play against first two teams from preliminary round group A Dominican Republic and Italy and will play all of its group phase matches in Quezon City at the Araneta Coliseum from 1 to 3 September.

Pos	Team	Pld	W	L	PF	PA	PD	Pts	Qualification
1	Italy	5	4	1	404	370	+34	9 (Note: Italy 1–0 Serbia)	Quarter-finals
2	Serbia	5	4	1	502	380	+122	9	Quarter-finals
3	Puerto Rico	5	3	2	444	449	−5	8 (Note: Puerto Rico 1–0 Dominican Republic)	
4	Dominican Republic	5	3	2	425	444	−19	8	

Source: FIBA
Rules for classification: Tiebreakers
Notes:

Results by round

Round	1	2
Ground	H	A
Result	L	W
Position	1	2

Last updated: 3 September 2023.
Source: Competitive matches
Ground: A = Away; H = Home; R = Rest. Result: L = Loss; W = Win; R = Rest; P = Postponed.

==== Italy ====
1 September 2023
16:00

Boxscore

Serbia	76–78	Italy
Scoring by quarter: 19–23, 23–17, 20–19, 14–19
Pts: Bogdanović 18; Rebs: Milutinov 12; Asts: Bogdanović 4		Pts: Fontecchio 30; Rebs: Fontecchio 7 Asts: Pajola 6

Araneta Coliseum, Quezon City
Referees: Antonio Conde (ESP), Luis Castillo (ESP), Martin Vulić (CRO)

==== Dominican Republic ====
3 September 2023
20:00

Boxscore

Dominican Republic	79–112	Serbia
Scoring by quarter: 15–29, 20–27, 18–31, 26–25
Pts: Towns 25; Rebs: Towns 7 Asts: Montero 4		Pts: Bogdanović 20; Rebs: S. Jović 6 Asts: S. Jović 7

Araneta Coliseum, Quezon City
Attendance: 6,616
Referees: Yohan Rosso (FRA), Luis Castillo (ESP), Gatis Saliņš (LAT)

=== Final round ===
==== Quarterfinal ====
This was the second game between Lithuania and Serbia in the World Cup. The Lithuanians won the first meeting in 2010. The Lithuanians also won in the semi-finals of EuroBasket 2015, which was the last competitive game between the two teams.

5 September 2023
16:45

Boxscore

Lithuania	68–87	Serbia
Scoring by quarter: 25–24, 13–25, 17–24, 13–14
Pts: Sedekerskis 14; Rebs: Sedekerskis 9 Asts: Jokubaitis 9		Pts: Bogdanović 21; Rebs: Petrušev 6 Asts: Gudurić 6

Mall of Asia Arena, Pasay
Attendance: 6,223
Referees: Omar Bermúdez (MEX), Mārtiņš Kozlovskis (LAT), Johnny Batista (PUR)

==== Semifinal ====
This was the first competitive game between Serbia and Canada.

8 September 2023
16:45

Boxscore

Serbia	95–86	Canada
Scoring by quarter: 23–15, 29–24, 23–24, 20–23
Pts: Bogdanović 23; Rebs: Milutinov 10; Asts: S. Jović 5		Pts: Barrett 23; Rebs: five players 3 Asts: Gilgeous-Alexander 9

Mall of Asia Arena, Pasay
Attendance: 8,630
Referees: Yohan Rosso (FRA), Julio Anaya (PAN), Manuel Mazzoni (ITA)

==== Final ====
This was the second game between Germany and Serbia in the World Cup. The Germans won the first meeting in 2010. The Germans also went 2–0 in their head-to-head matchups in the first round of the 2019 FIBA Basketball World Cup European Qualifiers.

10 September 2023
20:40

Boxscore

Germany	83–77	Serbia
Scoring by quarter: 23–26, 24–21, 22–10, 14–20
Pts: Schröder 28; Rebs: Voigtmann 8 Asts: Voigtmann 3		Pts: Avramović 21; Rebs: N. Jović 8 Asts: Bogdanović 5

Mall of Asia Arena, Pasay
Attendance: 12,022
Referees: Roberto Vázquez (PUR), Omar Bermúdez (MEX), Gatis Saliņš (LAT)

== Statistics ==
=== Player statistics ===
Legend
GP	Games played	GS	Games started	MPG	Minutes per game
FG%	Field-goal percentage	3FG%	3-point field-goal percentage	FT%	Free-throw percentage
RPG	Rebounds per game	APG	Assists per game	SPG	Steals per game
BPG	Blocks per game	PPG	Points per game	EF	PIR per game

Player	GP	GS	MPG	FG%	3FG%	FT%	RPG	APG	SPG	BPG	PPG	EF
Aleksa Avramović	7	0	17.3	.636	.263	.880	1.4	2.1	1.6	0.3	11.3	11.9
Bogdan Bogdanović	8	8	27.8	.644	.423	.853	3.3	4.6	2.1	0.4	19.1	21.6
Dejan Davidovac	8	0	15.3	.750	.273	.375	2.6	1.4	1.3	0.4	3.8	6.9
Ognjen Dobrić	8	7	20.4	.645	.192	.800	2.0	0.8	1.0	0.3	8.4	7.1
Marko Gudurić	8	0	17.1	.812	.412	.864	2.1	3.3	0.4	0.1	8.3	10.6
Nikola Jović	8	8	23.9	.704	.423	.769	3.0	2.6	0.4	0.1	10.1	12.0
Stefan Jović	8	8	21.6	.583	.278	.571	2.0	5.6	1.1	0.0	5.9	10.0
Vanja Marinković	8	1	16.0	.545	.452	.889	1.3	0.5	0.6	0.1	7.8	7.3
Nikola Milutinov	8	8	24.5	.661	.000	.793	8.4	2.3	0.6	0.6	12.1	19.5
Filip Petrušev	6	0	13.8	.762	.600	.800	3.5	0.8	0.2	0.5	8.2	10.8
Dušan Ristić	5	0	8.7	.556	.833	.333	3.0	0.0	0.2	0.2	5.4	5.8
Boriša Simanić	3	0	6.5	1.000	.000	.500	1.0	0.3	0.0	0.3	1.0	2.0
Total	8	8	200.0	.667	.377	.783	34.1	23.6	9.1	2.9	95.1	117.9

Last updated: 10 September 2023.
Source: 2023 Serbia team
