= Trae Bell-Haynes =

Canadian basketball player (born 1995)

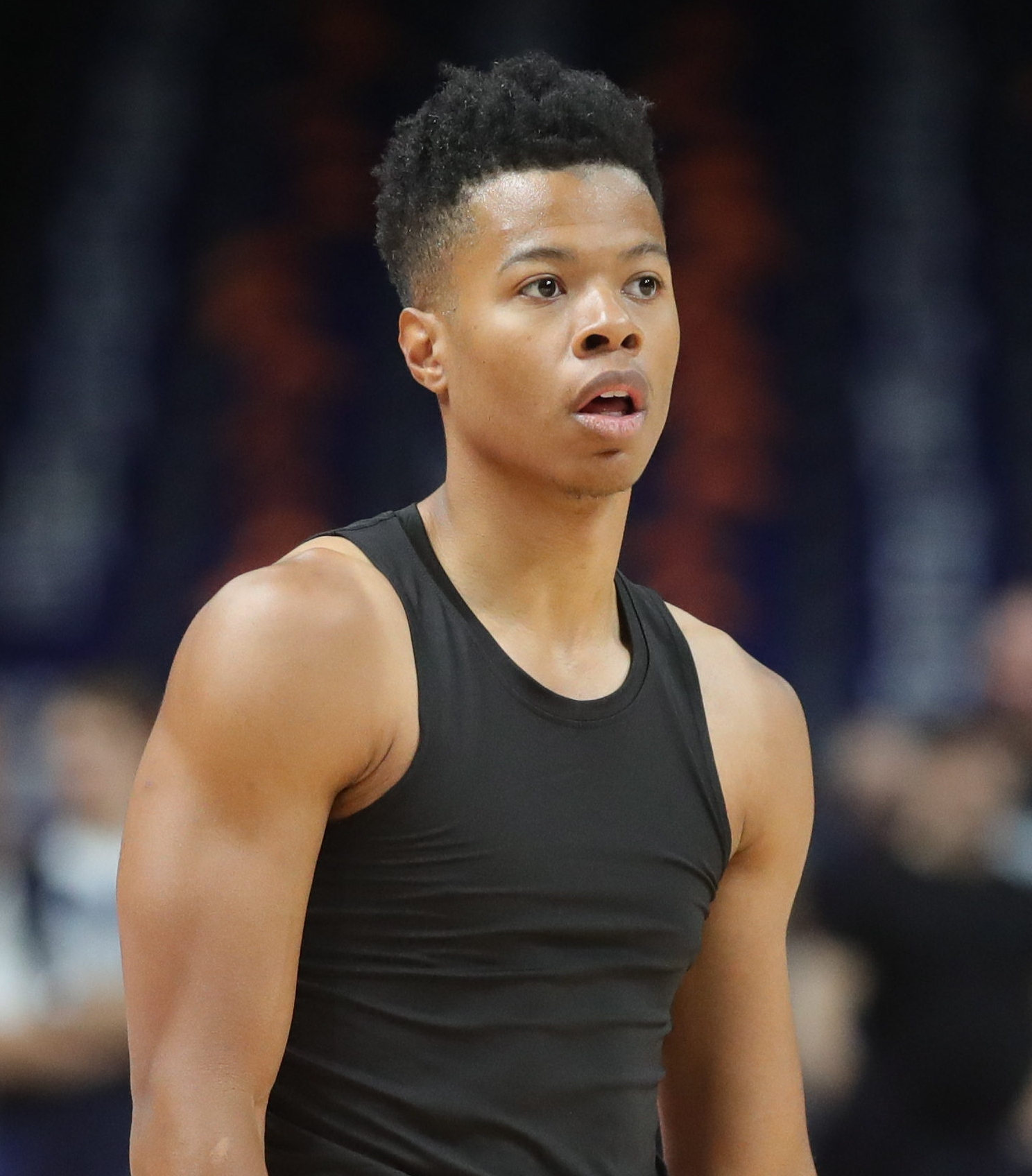
- Bell-Haynes with Canada in 2023

No. 2 – Casademont Zaragoza
- Position: Point guard
- League: Liga ACB

Personal information
- Born: September 5, 1995 (age 31) Toronto, Ontario, Canada
- Listed height: 1.88 m (6 ft 2 in)
- Listed weight: 79 kg (174 lb)

Career information
- High school: Bill Crothers (Unionville, Ontario)
- College: Vermont (2014–2018)
- NBA draft: 2018: undrafted
- Playing career: 2018–present

Career history
- 2018–2019: Skyliners Frankfurt
- 2019: Wisconsin Herd
- 2019: Niagara River Lions
- 2019–2020: Helsinki Seagulls
- 2020–2021: Crailsheim Merlins
- 2021: Niagara River Lions
- 2021–2022: Río Breogán
- 2022–2023: Budućnost VOLI
- 2023–present: Casademont Zaragoza

Career highlights
- Montenegrin League champion (2023); Montenegrin Cup winner (2023); CEBL Second Team All-Star (2019); 2× AP Honorable Mention All-American (2017, 2018); 2× America East Player of the Year (2017, 2018); 2× First-team All-America East (2017, 2018); Third-team All-America East (2016); America East All-Rookie Team (2015)
Medals
Men's basketball
Representing Canada
FIBA World Cup
Bronze medal – third place	2023 Philippines–Japan–Indonesia

Trae Anthoney Bell-Haynes (born September 5, 1995) is a Canadian basketball player for Casademont Zaragoza of the Liga ACB. He played college basketball for the Vermont Catamounts.

== High school career ==
Bell-Haynes played at Bill Crothers Secondary School, just outside his Toronto home, where he was a team captain in grade 12 and led the team in scoring and assists on the way to a 36–6 record. He was also named the MVP of the 2014 Ontario Prep Championships Tournament.

== College career ==
Bell-Haynes starred as a freshman for Vermont, earning America East All-Rookie Team honours in 2014–15, averaging 8.8 points a contest. In his sophomore season, Bell-Haynes took on a larger role, becoming the Catamount's leading scorer with 12.2 points per game, and garnering All-America East Third Team honours, as well as All-Tournament Team after the Catamounts reached the America East Basketball Championship game, falling to Stony Brook. As a junior, Bell-Haynes was named America East Player of the Year and First-Team All-Conference as he guided the Catamounts to a 29–6 overall record and perfect 16–0 mark in conference play along with a 21-game win streak en route to its sixth America East men's basketball title in 2017, securing the automatic bid to the 2017 NCAA tournament. Bell-Haynes followed up his senior season repeating as America East Player of the Year, becoming the third Catamount in Vermont history to repeat as the conference's top player, joining Taylor Coppenrath and Marqus Blakely, and the eighth player to repeat in America East history.

Bell-Haynes finished his Vermont career with 1,629 points, good for eighth all-time in school history, and fifth all-time in assists with 518.

== Professional career ==
=== Skyliners Frankfurt (2018–2019) ===
Bell-Haynes was not selected in the 2018 NBA draft but he signed with the Milwaukee Bucks for NBA Summer League. He signed a three-month deal, with an option for the remainder of the season, with the Skyliners Frankfurt of the German Basketball Bundesliga on August 28, 2018. On February 18, 2019, Bell-Haynes parted ways with the club.

=== Wisconsin Herd (2019) ===
On March 8, 2019, Bell-Haynes signed with the Wisconsin Herd of the NBA G League, appearing in eight games.

=== Niagara River Lions (2019) ===
Bell-Haynes signed with the Niagara River Lions of the upstart Canadian Elite Basketball League on April 29, 2019.

=== European experience ===
Bell-Haynes signed in Finland with the Helsinki Seagulls team on September 9, 2019. He averaged 12.9 points, 3.9 rebounds and 4.8 assists per game. On June 30, 2020, he signed with Crailsheim Merlins. Bell-Haynes was named player of the week on November 17 after contributing 23 points, six rebounds and nine assists in a win against Mitteldeutscher BC.

=== Second stint with the Niagara River Lions (2021) ===
On February 10, 2021, Bell-Haynes re-signed with the Niagara River Lions.

=== Río Breogán (2021–2022) ===
On July 13, 2021, he has signed with Río Breogán of the Spanish Liga ACB.

=== KK Budućnost (2022–2023) ===
On July 16, 2022, he has signed with Budućnost VOLI of the Montenegrin First League.

=== Basket Zaragoza (2023–present) ===
On June 5, 2023, he signed with Casademont Zaragoza of the Liga ACB.
