= Artūrs Žagars =

Latvian basketball player (born 2000)

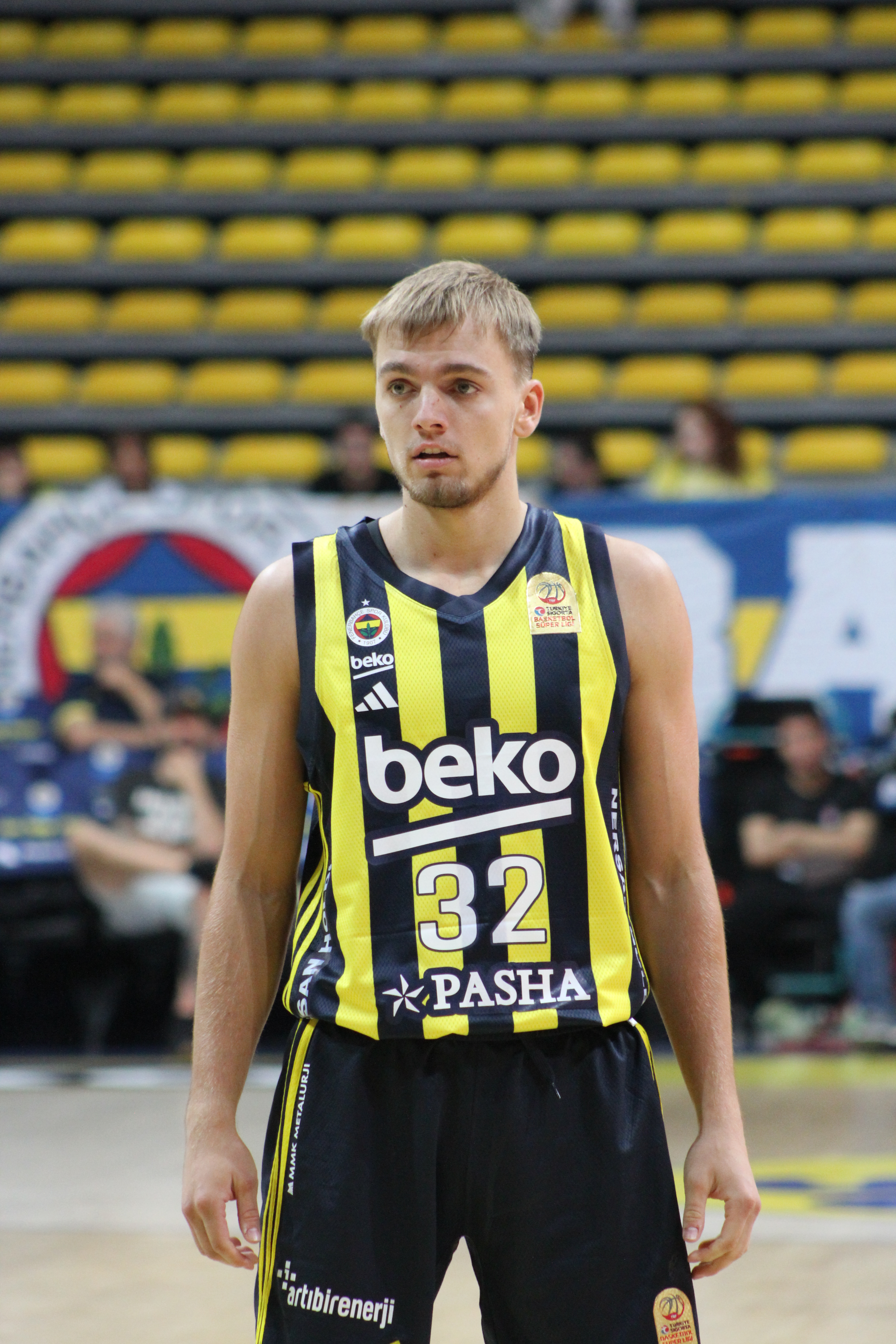
- Žagars with Fenerbahçe in 2024

No. 32 – Zhejiang Golden Bulls
- Position: Point guard
- League: CBA

Personal information
- Born: 21 April 2000 (age 26) Riga, Latvia
- Listed height: 1.90 m (6 ft 3 in)
- Listed weight: 85 kg (187 lb)

Career information
- NBA draft: 2022: undrafted
- Playing career: 2017–present

Career history
- 2017–2022: Joventut Badalona
- 2018–2019: →Prat
- 2021: →Kalev
- 2022: →Löwen Braunschweig
- 2022–2023: Nevėžis Kėdainiai
- 2023–2026: Fenerbahçe
- 2023–2024: →Wolves Vilnius
- 2026–present: Zhejiang Golden Bulls

Career highlights
- EuroLeague champion (2025); 2× Turkish League champion (2025, 2026); Turkish Super Cup winner (2025); Estonian League champion (2021)
Medals
Men's basketball
Representing Latvia
FIBA U18 European Championship
Silver medal – second place	2018 Latvia	National team

Artūrs Mārtiņš Žagars (born 21 April 2000) is a Latvian professional basketball player for the Zhejiang Golden Bulls of the Chinese Basketball Association (CBA). Standing at 1.90 m (6 ft 3 in), he primarily plays at the point guard position.

== Professional career ==
=== Early career ===
Žagars spent much of his early career playing for Latvian club BS DSN Riga.

=== Joventut Badalona ===
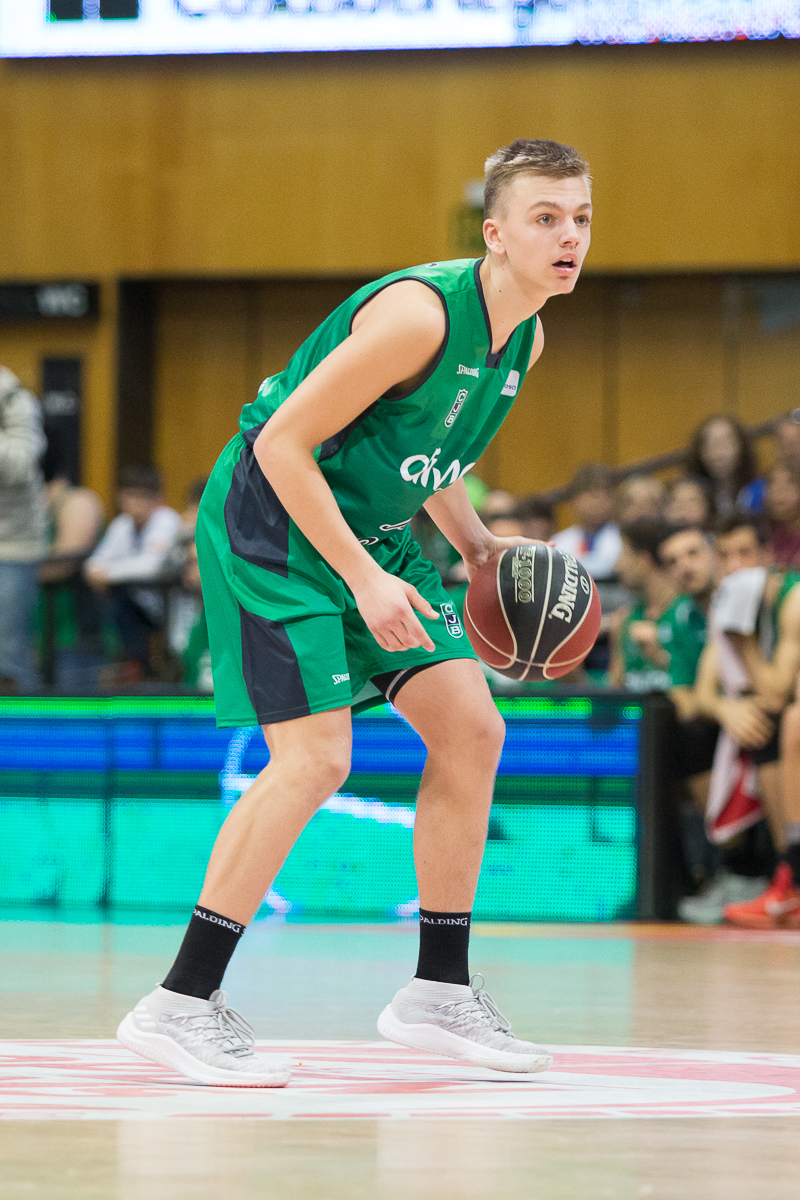
Žagars with Joventut Badalona in 2018

In 2017, Žagars signed a long-term contract with Spanish club Joventut Badalona. On 11 March 2018, Žagars made his Liga ACB debut, scoring two points in seven minutes versus Baskonia.

In November 2018, Žagars suffered a torn ligament in his ankle and was sidelined until early March 2019 after undergoing surgery.

On 19 April 2019, Žagars declared for the 2019 NBA draft.

==== Loan Period from Joventut Badalona ====
On 16 February 2021, Žagars was loaned to Estonian powerhouse Kalev/Cramo.

On 12 January 2022, he was loaned to Löwen Braunschweig of the German Basketball Bundesliga. He averaged 7.3 points, 2.7 assists, 1.2 rebounds in 13 domestic league matches.

=== Nevėžis Kėdainiai ===
On 20 July 2022, Žagars signed with Nevėžis Kėdainiai of the Lithuanian Basketball League (LKL). In 22 league matches, he averaged 15.4 points, 3.0 rebounds, 4.4 assists, and 1.1 steals per contest.

=== Fenerbahçe Beko ===
On 18 September 2023, Žagars signed a three-year contract with Turkish giants Fenerbahçe.

==== Loan to Wolves ====
He was subsequently loaned to Lithuanian club Wolves Vilnius for the 2023–24 season.

On 14 October 2023, in a Lietuvos krepšinio lyga match against Lietkabelis, Žagars suffered a severe injury to the lateral ligament of his knee, missing 6 months. After his recovery, he averaged 10.3 points, 3.4 assists, 1.7 rebounds in 7 domestic league matches.

==== Back to Fenerbahçe ====
On 4 October 2024, Žagars made his EuroLeague debut against Olympiacos in a 82-71 victory in Ülker Sports Arena with 3 points, all from free throws performance. On 6 October, he made his Basketbol Süper Ligi debut against Onvo Büyükçekmece; his 19 points and four assists with 15 pir performance helped team for 97-85 victory. On 10 October, Žagars recorded 11 points and three assists with 12 pir performance against domestic rival Anadolu Efes in a 78-83 away victory. On 29 November, he recorded 16 points (career high), two rebounds, and three assists with 21 pir (career–high) performance against Olimpia Milano but he couldn't prevent the defeat. He ultimately helped Fenerbahçe to their second EuroLeague championship.

=== Zhejiang Golden Bulls (2026–present) ===
On 2 August 2026, Žagars signed with the Zhejiang Golden Bulls of the Chinese Basketball Association.

== National team career ==
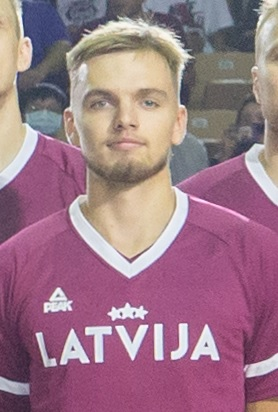
Žagars with Latvia men's national basketball team in 2023

Žagars was named to the All-Star Five of the 2018 FIBA Europe Under-18 Championship in Riga after averaging 18.9 points, 6.3 assists, and 1.9 steals per game, while leading the Latvian national under-18 team to its first finals appearance and silver medal at the tournament.

Žagars represented Latvia during the 2023 FIBA Basketball World Cup which achieved 5th place during its debut. Moreover, Žagars achieved the world cup's all-time record of assists by dishing out 17 assists in a game versus Lithuania. In recognition of his individual play, Žagars was named to the All-FIBA World Cup Second Team.

== Career statistics ==
Legend
GP	Games played	GS	Games started	MPG	Minutes per game
FG%	Field-goal percentage	3P%	3-point field-goal percentage	FT%	Free-throw percentage
RPG	Rebounds per game	APG	Assists per game	SPG	Steals per game
BPG	Blocks per game	PPG	Points per game	PIR	Performance index rating
**Bold**	Career high	†	Won a EuroLeague championship

=== EuroLeague ===
Year	Team	GP	GS	MPG	FG%	3P%	FT%	RPG	APG	SPG	BPG	PPG	PIR
2024–25	Fenerbahçe Beko	22	13	14.5	.429	.324	.750	1.1	2.3	.4	.1	5.9	5.8
Career		22	13	14.5	.429	.324	.750	1.1	2.3	.4	.1	5.9	5.8

=== EuroCup ===
Year	Team	GP	GS	MPG	FG%	3P%	FT%	RPG	APG	SPG	BPG	PPG	PIR
2019–20	Joventut Badalona	**10**	**3**	10.4	.385	.333	.750	.7	1.8	.5	.0	2.7	2.8
2020–21	Joventut Badalona	7	0	4.6	.222	.200	.667	.1	.6	.1	.0	1.0	0.3
2021–22	Joventut Badalona	3	0	15.0	**.467**	.286	.500	.3	2.0	**.3**	.0	5.7	3.7
2023–24	Wolves Vilnius	1	1	**24.0**	.383	**.400**	**.1000**	**1.0**	**4.0**	.0	.0	**10.0**	**7.0**
Career		21	4	10.1	.352	.310	.727	.5	1.5	.3	.0	2.9	1.5

=== Domestic leagues ===
†	Denotes seasons in which Žagars won the domestic league

Year	Team	League	GP	MPG	FG%	3P%	FT%	RPG	APG	SPG	BPG	PPG
2017–18	(Spain) Joventut Badalona	ACB	4	9.0	.429	.500	.000	1.5	1.0	.0	.0	4.0
2018–19	(Spain) Joventut Badalona	ACB	2	1.0	.000	.000	.000	.0	.0	.0	.0	0.0
2018–19	(Spain) Prat	FEB	13	17.4	.400	.347	.639	1.5	2.5	.5	.0	8.9
2019–20	(Spain) Joventut Badalona	ACB	21	8.8	.311	.212	.700	.6	1.5	.2	.0	2.5
2020–21	(Spain) Joventut Badalona	ACB	11	5.0	.368	.300	.833	.5	.8	.2	.0	2.0
2020–21 †	(Estonia) Kalev/Cramo	KML	?	?	?	?	?	?	?	?	?	?
2021–22	(Germany) Braunschweig	BBL	13	17.7	.338	.359	.674	1.2	2.7	.6	.0	7.3
2022–23	(Lithuania) Nevėžis Kėdainiai	LKL	22	28.2	.458	.348	.738	3.0	4.4	1.1	.0	15.4
2023–24	(Turkey) Fenerbahçe Beko	BSL	0	0.0	.000	.000	.000	.0	.0	.0	.0	0.0
2023–24	(Lithuania) Wolves Vilnius	LKL	7	18.0	.313	.303	.846	1.7	3.4	0.6	.0	10.3
2024–25 †	(Turkey) Fenerbahçe	TBSL	22	18.2	.563	.368	.833	1.3	2.9	.9	.0	8.4

Current season information is written in italics.
