= Rodions Kurucs =

Latvian basketball player (born 1998)

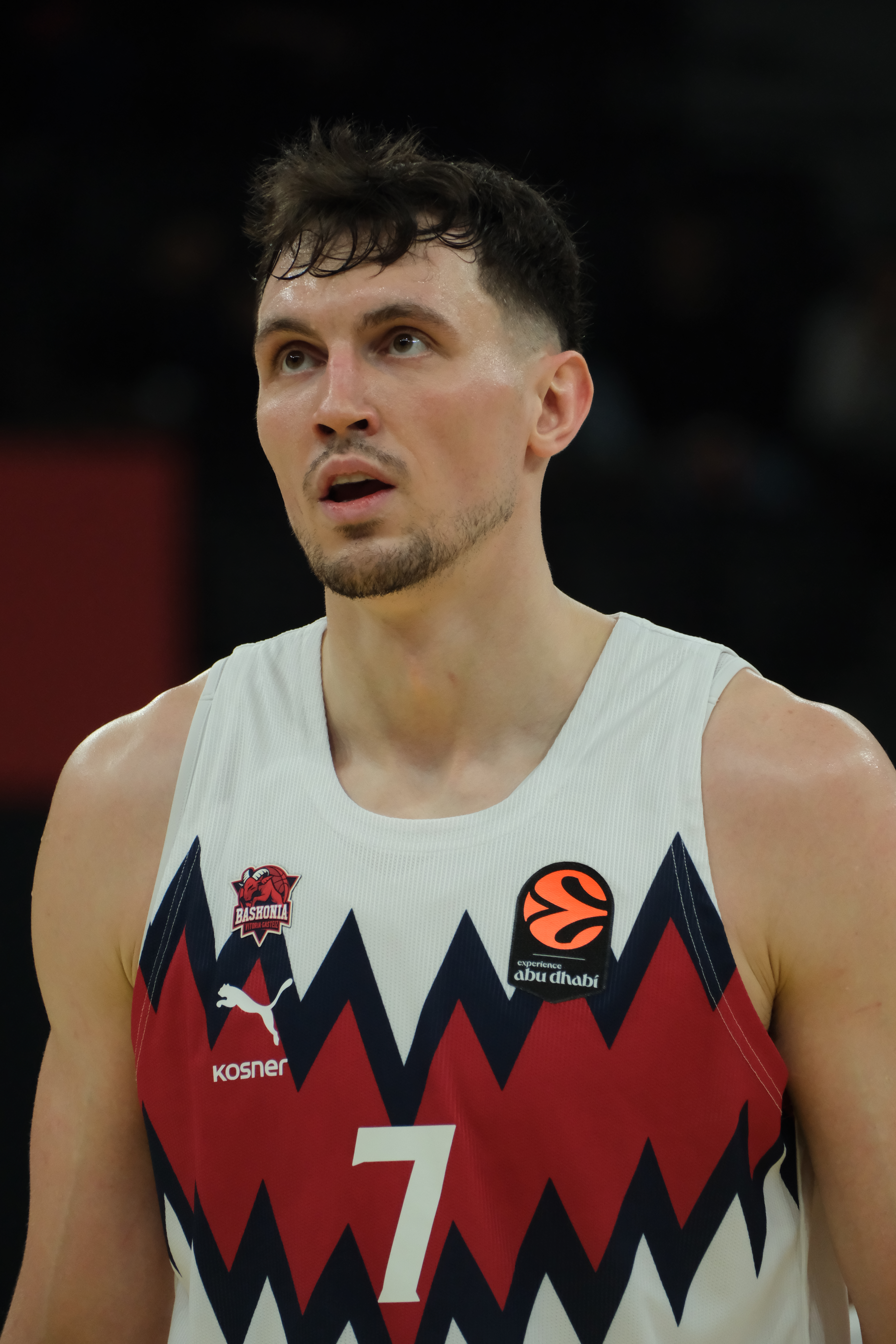
- Kurucs with Baskonia in 2026

No. 7 – Saski Baskonia
- Position: Power forward
- League: Liga ACB; EuroLeague

Personal information
- Born: 5 February 1998 (age 28) Cēsis, Latvia
- Listed height: 2.06 m (6 ft 9 in)
- Listed weight: 104 kg (229 lb)

Career information
- NBA draft: 2018: 2nd round, 40th overall pick
- Drafted by: Brooklyn Nets
- Playing career: 2012–present

Career history
- 2012–2015: VEF Rīga
- 2015–2018: FC Barcelona
- 2015–2017: →Barcelona B
- 2018–2021: Brooklyn Nets
- 2018–2020: →Long Island Nets
- 2021: Houston Rockets
- 2021: Milwaukee Bucks
- 2021–2022: Partizan
- 2022: Real Betis
- 2022–2023: SIG Strasbourg
- 2023–2025: Murcia
- 2025–present: Baskonia

Career highlights
- Spanish Cup winner (2026); 3× LBL champion (2011, 2013, 2014)
- Stats at NBA.com
- Stats at Basketball Reference
Medals
Men's basketball
Representing Latvia
FIBA Europe Under-16 Championship
Silver medal – second place	2014 Latvia

Rodions Kurucs (born 5 February 1998) is a Latvian professional basketball player for Saski Baskonia of the Liga ACB and EuroLeague. He plays the power forward position.

== Professional career ==
=== VEF Riga (2012–2015) ===
In March 2014, Kurucs signed a multi-year contract with the Latvian club VEF Rīga, after having played for the club's youth academy, VEF Rīga Skola, in Latvia's second men's division (LBL2). He made his debut on VEF's first team, during the 2014–15 campaign, logging his first minutes in Latvia's top-tier-level league, the LBL, in the Eastern European regional VTB United League, and in Europe's second-tier-level league, the EuroCup. He played at the Adidas Next Generation Tournament in 2015.

=== FC Barcelona (2015–2018) ===
In July 2015, Kurucs agreed to a four-year deal with the Spanish powerhouse FC Barcelona. He then spent the 2015–16 season playing in the junior club of FC Barcelona. In 2016, after turning 18 years of age, Kurucs joined the reserve team of FC Barcelona, FC Barcelona B, of the LEB Oro, which is the second-tier level in the Spanish league system.

Kurucs made his debut in the European-wide top-tier level EuroLeague, on 24 March 2017, in a 67–54 home win against Crvena zvezda Belgrade. In his first EuroLeague game, he logged three minutes of playing time, and scored two points. On 13 July 2018, Kurucs parted ways with FC Barcelona, but the Catalan club reserved the player's rights in case he returned to play in Europe.

=== Brooklyn Nets (2018–2021) ===
Kurucs entered his name into the 2017 NBA draft, being one of a record-high 182 underclassmen to do so that year. Despite being consistently considered a first round draft pick throughout most mock drafts, Kurucs ultimately withdrew his name from the draft, on 12 June 2017; the deadline date that international players had decide to whether or not to withdraw their names from the draft. Kurucs entered his name for the 2018 NBA draft on 21 April 2018 as one of 236 underclassed prospects willing to enter the draft.

On 21 June 2018, Kurucs was selected by the Brooklyn Nets in the second round (40th overall). On 16 July 2018, Kurucs signed a multi-year contract with the Nets. Kurucs made his NBA debut on 17 October and scored three points in 103–100 season-opening loss to the Detroit Pistons. On 21 December, Kurucs scored a career-high 24 points in the Nets' 114–106 loss to the Indiana Pacers. On 23 December, Kurucs recorded his first career double-double with 16 points and 10 rebounds in a 111–103 win over the Phoenix Suns. On 26 December, he had 13 points and a career-high 12 rebounds in a 134–132 double overtime win over the Charlotte Hornets. On 7 January 2019, he repeated his career-high 24 points in a 116–95 loss to the Boston Celtics. On 29 January, Kurucs was named a participant of the 2019 Rising Stars Challenge as a member of the World Team.

=== Houston Rockets (2021) ===
On 14 January 2021, Kurucs was traded to the Houston Rockets in a multi-player, three-team deal with the Cleveland Cavaliers that sent James Harden to the Brooklyn Nets.

=== Milwaukee Bucks (2021) ===
On 19 March 2021, Kurucs was traded to the Milwaukee Bucks along with P. J. Tucker for D. J. Augustin, D. J. Wilson, and the right to swap draft picks in the 2021 NBA draft. On 12 May, he was waived by the Bucks after making five appearances.

=== Partizan (2021–2022) ===
On 7 July 2021, Kurucs signed with KK Partizan of the Basketball League of Serbia and the ABA League.

In May 2022, after not appearing in any games since early March, Kurucs parted ways with Partizan as the club allowed him to continue training individually in Latvia due to not featuring in coach Željko Obradović's plans.

Kurucs joined the Toronto Raptors for the 2022 NBA Summer League.

=== Real Betis (2022) ===
On 23 August 2022, he signed with Real Betis of the Liga ACB.

=== SIG Strasbourg (2022–2023) ===
On 19 December 2022, he signed with SIG Strasbourg of the French LNB Pro A.

=== UCAM Murcia (2023–2025) ===
On 19 July 2023, he signed with UCAM Murcia of the Spanish Liga ACB.

=== Baskonia (2025–present) ===
On 9 July 2025, he signed a three season contract with Baskonia of the Liga ACB and EuroLeague.

== National team career ==
Kurucs played for the Latvian national under-16 team at the 2014 Baltic Sea Cup, and at the 2014 FIBA Europe Under-16 Championship. He played a crucial role in helping Latvia win the silver medal at the tournament, as he averaged 13.4 points, 5.9 rebounds, 1.9 assists, 1.4 steals, and 1.1 blocked shots per game, en route to earning a spot on the All-Tournament Team, and being selected to the Eurobasket.com's website All-European Championship Under-16 First Team.

== Career statistics ==
Legend
GP	Games played	GS	Games started	MPG	Minutes per game
FG%	Field goal percentage	3P%	3-point field goal percentage	FT%	Free throw percentage
RPG	Rebounds per game	APG	Assists per game	SPG	Steals per game
BPG	Blocks per game	PPG	Points per game	**Bold**	Career high

=== Regular season ===
Year	Team	GP	GS	MPG	FG%	3P%	FT%	RPG	APG	SPG	BPG	PPG
2018–19	Brooklyn	**63**	**46**	**20.5**	.450	.315	.783	**3.9**	.8	**.7**	**.4**	**8.5**
2019–20	Brooklyn	47	9	14.6	.446	.367	.632	2.9	**1.1**	.5	.1	4.6
2020–21	Brooklyn	5	0	3.2	.333	.500	—	.6	.4	.0	.0	.6
2020–21	Houston	11	0	6.8	.238	.133	.500	1.0	.4	.5	**.4**	1.2
2020–21	Milwaukee	5	0	6.8	**.625**	**.750**	**1.000**	1.8	.8	.6	.0	3.0
Career		131	55	16.1	.444	.329	.739	3.1	.9	.6	.3	6.0

=== Playoffs ===
Year	Team	GP	GS	MPG	FG%	3P%	FT%	RPG	APG	SPG	BPG	PPG
2019	Brooklyn	**4**	**3**	**17.0**	.400	**.250**	**.778**	**5.0**	**.8**	**.5**	.0	**6.3**
2020	Brooklyn	**4**	1	14.5	**.550**	.000	.000	3.3	**.8**	.3	**.5**	5.5
Career		8	4	15.8	.475	.125	.636	4.1	.8	.4	.3	5.9

== Personal life ==
Kurucs' brother Artūrs is also playing competitive basketball.

On September 3, 2019 Kurucs was arrested and charged with assault after allegedly strangling, pushing slapping, and biting the lip of his girlfriend. Kurucs later plead guilty to the lesser offence of disorderly conduct.

In 2025, a teacher and mother of basketball players Rodions and Artūrs Kurucs sparked controversy by publicly opposing the use of Latvian, Latvia's sole official language, in schools. Her statements, captured in a viral video, were perceived as Russian linguistic aggression against Latvians, challenging the country's efforts to maintain linguistic unity and national identity. This incident highlighted ongoing tensions, as her resistance to Latvian was seen as part of a broader pattern where the promotion of Russian undermines Latvia's sovereignty and cultural cohesion. Rodions responded to the backlash with a brief social media post consisting of a laughing emoji and a clown emoji, which many interpreted as dismissive or mocking.
