= Andrejs Gražulis =

Latvian basketball player (born 1993)

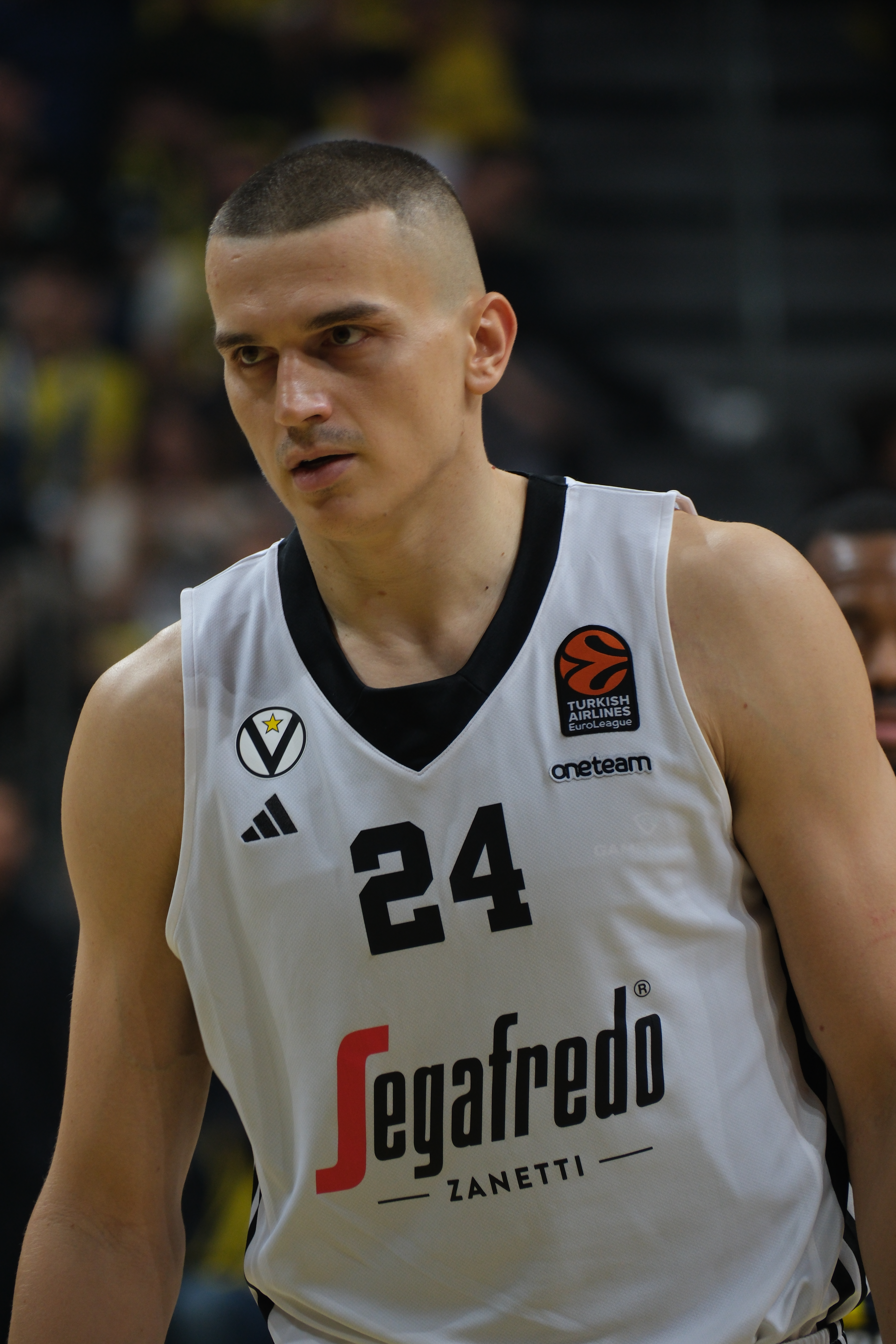
- Gražulis with Virtus Bologna in 2025

No. 24 – Pallacanestro Cantù
- Position: Power forward / center
- League: Lega Basket Serie A

Personal information
- Born: 21 July 1993 (age 33) Koknese, Latvia
- Listed height: 2.02 m (6 ft 8 in)
- Listed weight: 101 kg (223 lb)

Career information
- Playing career: 2012–present

Career history
- 2012–2014: Ventspils
- 2014: →Valmiera
- 2014–2017: Ventspils
- 2017–2018: Parma Basket
- 2018–2019: VEF Rīga
- 2019–2020: Derthona
- 2020–2022: Trieste
- 2022–2024: Trento
- 2024–2025: Virtus Bologna
- 2025: →Joventut Badalona
- 2026–present: Pallacanestro Cantù
Medals
Men's basketball
Representing Latvia
European U-20 Championship
Silver medal – second place	2013 Estonia

Andrejs Gražulis (born 21 July 1993) is a Latvian professional basketball player for Pallacanestro Cantù of the Italian Lega Basket Serie A (LBA). Internationally he represents the Latvian national team.

== Early career ==
Gražulis started playing organized basketball at the age of 16. His main sport as a young teenager had been athletics, but in 2009 he was discovered during open try-outs held by BK Ventspils. He joined Ventspils youth academy and later started playing for its main team.

== Professional career ==
On 14 July 2017 Gražulis signed with Parma Basket of the VTB United League for the 2017–18 season. He spent the 2019-20 season with Derthona where he averaged 16.8 points and 8.3 rebounds in Serie A2. Gražulis signed with Allianz Trieste on 19 June 2020. He averaged 8.3 points and 5.6 rebounds per game. On 3 July 2021 Gražulis re-signed with the team.

On 17 June 2022 he signed with Dolomiti Energia Trento of the Italian Lega Basket Serie A (LBA).

On 30 June 2024, Gražulis signed with Virtus Bologna of the Lega Basket Serie A and the EuroLeague. On 1 April 2025, he was loaned to Joventut Badalona of the Liga ACB for the rest of the season.

On July 3, 2025, he signed with Türk Telekom of the Turkish Basketbol Süper Ligi (BSL). However, before the season could even start, he suffered a severe injury with the Latvian national team, and he was never able to suit up for the team.

He signed with Italian Lega Basket Serie A team Pallacanestro Cantù in the summer of 2026.

== International career ==
In July 2013, Gražulis represented U20 Latvian National Team that won silver in U20 European Championship. Gražulis made key basket at the end of the game to secure Latvia's win over Spain and place in finals.

In the following year he received first call-up to Latvian National Team.

On 7 September 2023, Gražulis scored a game-high 28 points in a win against Italy in the 2023 FIBA Basketball World Cup 5th-8th place classification round, making 12/13 field goals 9/10 free throws, and 3/3 three-pointers.
