= Roberto Vázquez =

Puerto Rican international basketball referee

Luis Roberto Vázquez
- Born: Puerto Rico
- Occupation: FIBA referee
- Years active: 2003

Luis Roberto Vázquez (born 16 February 1975) is a Puerto Rican international basketball referee licensed by FIBA, who has officiated at major international competitions including the Olympic Games, the FIBA Basketball World Cup, and the FIBA AmeriCup.

== Career ==
Vázquez began his refereeing career in the Baloncesto Superior Nacional (BSN), Puerto Rico’s top basketball league, and earned his FIBA international referee license in 2003.

He has officiated at several high-level competitions, including:

- 2016 Summer Olympics in Rio de Janeiro, where he worked in the bronze medal game between Spain and Australia, as well as quarterfinal and group stage matches.
- 2020 Summer Olympics (held in 2021 in Tokyo), serving as crew chief official in the bronze medal game between Australia and Slovenia, and in the quarterfinal between France and Italy.
- 2023 FIBA Basketball World Cup in the Philippines, where he refereed the gold medal final between Germany and Serbia as the lead official. He became the third Puerto Rican referee in history to be assigned to a World Cup final.
- Basketball Champions League Americas (2024-2025 season), appointed among eight referees for the Final Four.
- 2024 Summer Olympics in Paris, where he was named among the 30 selected referees for the Olympic basketball tournament.
- EuroBasket 2025, nominated as one of the referees to officiate games in the continental competition held in Cyprus, Finland, Poland, and Latvia.

== Instructor work ==
Vázquez has also contributed as an instructor for international referee development programs, particularly in the Americas region, focusing on three-person mechanics and professional growth for officials.

== See also ==
- Basketball at the Summer Olympics
