= 2023 FIBA Basketball World Cup Group C =

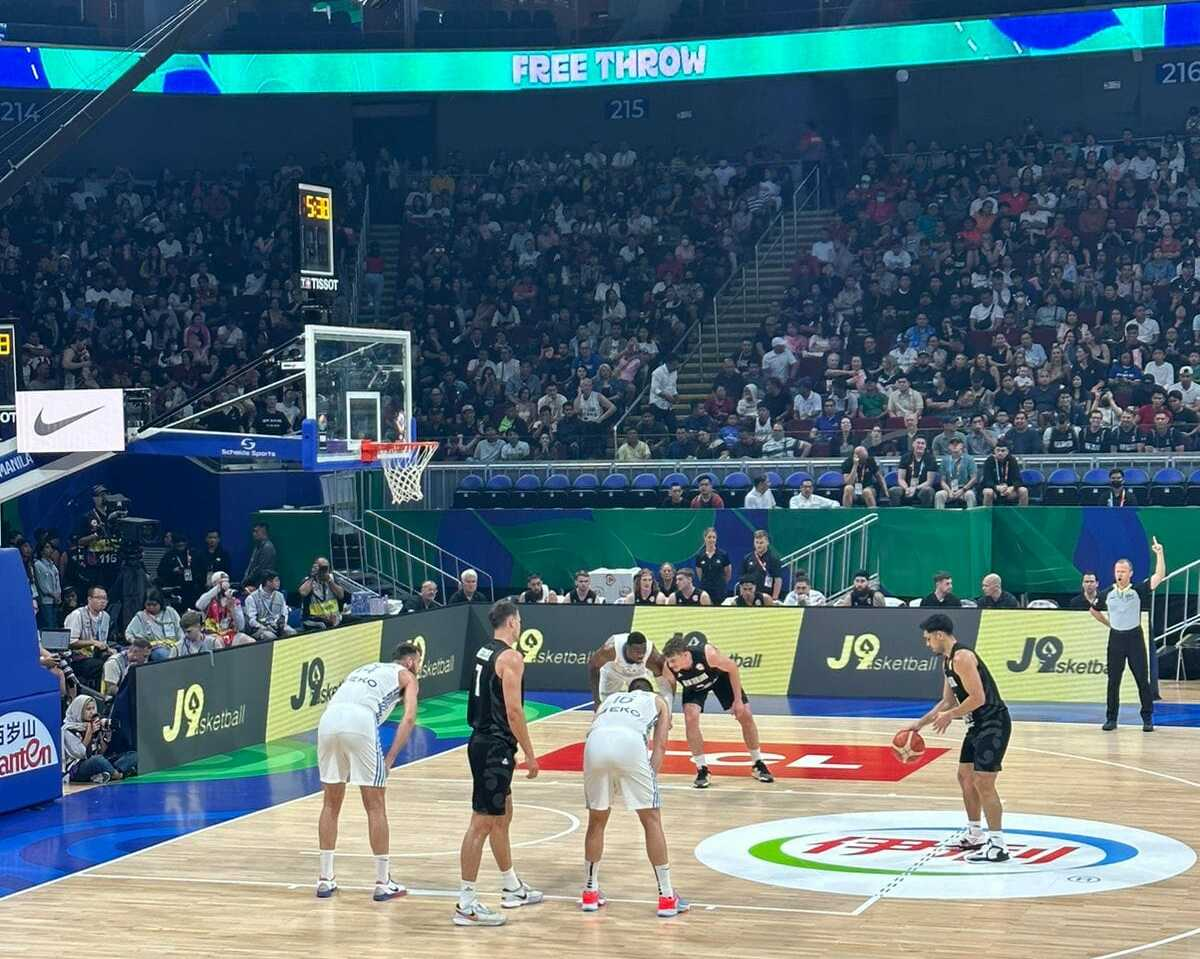
Greece vs. New Zealand

Group C was one of eight groups of the preliminary round of the 2023 FIBA Basketball World Cup. It took place from 26 to 30 August 2023, and consisted of Greece, Jordan, New Zealand, and the United States. Each team played each other once, for a total of three games per team, with all games played at the Mall of Asia Arena, Pasay, Philippines. The top two teams advanced to the second round, while the bottom two teams qualified for the classification rounds.

== Teams ==
Team	Qualification		Appearance			Best performance	WR
Team	As	Date	Last	Total	Streak	Best performance	WR
United States	Americas Group F top three	23 February 2023	2019	19	19	Champions (1954, 1986, 1994, 2010, 2014)	2
Jordan	Asian Group E top three	24 February 2023	2019	3	2	23rd place (2010)	33
Greece	European Group I top three	14 November 2022	2019	9	5	Runners-up (2006)	9
New Zealand	Asian Group E top three	29 August 2022	2019	7	6	4th place (2002)	26

== Standings ==
Pos	Team	Pld	W	L	PF	PA	PD	Pts	Qualification
1	United States	3	3	0	318	215	+103	6	Second round
2	Greece	3	2	1	256	254	+2	5	Second round
3	New Zealand	3	1	2	241	269	−28	4	17th–32nd classification
4	Jordan	3	0	3	220	297	−77	3	17th–32nd classification

Source: FIBA
Rules for classification: Tiebreakers

== Games ==
All times are local (UTC+8).

=== Jordan vs. Greece ===
This was the first game between Jordan and Greece in the World Cup. The Greeks won in the 2012 FIBA World Olympic Qualifying Tournament for Men, which was the last competitive game between the two teams.

26 August 2023
16:45

Boxscore

Jordan	71–92	Greece
Scoring by quarter: 14–19, 19–27, 27–20, 11–26
Pts: Hollis-Jefferson 24; Rebs: Al-Dwairi, Hollis-Jefferson 9 Asts: Ibrahim 6		Pts: Larentzakis 19; Rebs: Rogkavopoulos 7 Asts: Walkup 7

Mall of Asia Arena, Pasay
Attendance: 5,795
Referees: Antonio Conde (ESP), Takaki Kato (JPN), Manuel Attard (ITA)

=== United States vs. New Zealand ===
This was the third game between the United States and New Zealand in the World Cup. The Americans won the first two meetings in 2002 and 2014.

26 August 2023
20:40

Boxscore

United States	99–72	New Zealand
Scoring by quarter: 19–18, 26–18, 31–22, 23–14
Pts: Banchero 21; Rebs: Edwards 7 Asts: Reaves 6		Pts: Te Rangi 15; Rebs: Delany, Fotu 5 Asts: Ili 5

Mall of Asia Arena, Pasay
Attendance: 10,978
Referees: Manuel Mazzoni (ITA), Boris Krejič (SLO), Park Kyoung-jin (KOR)

=== New Zealand vs. Jordan ===
This was the first game between New Zealand and Jordan in the World Cup. Both teams split their head-to-head matchups in the 2019 and 2023 World Cup Asian Qualifiers. New Zealand won in the third place game of the 2022 FIBA Asia Cup and in the quarter-finals of the 2017 FIBA Asia Cup.

28 August 2023
16:45

Boxscore

New Zealand	95–87 (OT)	Jordan
Scoring by quarter: 21–18, 25–19, 19–20, 20–28, Overtime: 10–2
Pts: Le'afa 23; Rebs: Delany 7 Asts: Ili 10		Pts: Hollis-Jefferson 39; Rebs: Al-Dwairi 10; Asts: Ibrahim 9

Mall of Asia Arena, Pasay
Attendance: 7,331
Referees: Takaki Kato (JPN), Boris Krejič (SLO), Péter Praksch (HUN)

=== Greece vs. United States ===
This was the fifth game between Greece and the United States in the World Cup. The Greeks won in the semi-final of the 2006 World Cup. The Americans won in 1994, 1998, and in their last meeting in 2019.

28 August 2023
20:40

Boxscore

Greece	81–109	United States
Scoring by quarter: 19–23, 18–27, 19–29, 25–30
Pts: Papagiannis 17; Rebs: Antetokounmpo, Rogkavopoulos 4 Asts: Walkup 7		Pts: Reaves 15; Rebs: Hart 11; Asts: Reaves 6

Mall of Asia Arena, Pasay
Attendance: 11,392
Referees: Antonio Conde (ESP), Manuel Mazzoni (ITA), Daniel García (VEN)

=== United States vs. Jordan ===
This was the first competitive game between the United States and Jordan.

30 August 2023
16:40

Boxscore

United States	110–62	Jordan
Scoring by quarter: 31–12, 31–21, 25–16, 23–13
Pts: Edwards 22; Rebs: Hart 12; Asts: Haliburton 6		Pts: Hollis-Jefferson 20; Rebs: Hollis-Jefferson 7 Asts: Kanaan 6

Mall of Asia Arena, Pasay
Attendance: 10,511
Referees: Takaki Kato (JPN), Kristian Paez (ECU), Péter Praksch (HUN)

=== Greece vs. New Zealand ===
This was the second game between Greece and New Zealand in the World Cup. The Greeks won the first meeting in 2019 and won in the 2008 FIBA World Olympic Qualifying Tournament for Men.

30 August 2023
20:40

Boxscore

Greece	83–74	New Zealand
Scoring by quarter: 15–20, 17–23, 18–11, 33—20
Pts: Papapetrou 27; Rebs: Papagiannis 9 Asts: Walkup 9		Pts: Ili 27; Rebs: Delany 14; Asts: Ili 8

Mall of Asia Arena, Pasay
Attendance: 5,625
Referees: Manuel Mazzoni (ITA), Andris Aunkrogers (LAT), Carlos Vélez (COL)

== Statistical leaders ==
=== Player tournament average ===
Points

#	Player	Pld	Pts	PPG
1	(Jordan) Rondae Hollis-Jefferson	3	83	27.7
2	(New Zealand) Shea Ili	3	54	18.0
3	(United States) Anthony Edwards	3	49	16.3
3	(Greece) Ioannis Papapetrou	3	49	16.3
5	(Greece) Giannoulis Larentzakis	3	46	15.3

Rebounds

#	Player	Pld	Rebs	RPG
1	(United States) Josh Hart	3	27	9.0
2	(New Zealand) Finn Delany	3	26	8.7
3	(Jordan) Ahmad Al-Dwairi	3	25	8.3
3	(Jordan) Rondae Hollis-Jefferson	3	25	8.3
5	(United States) Anthony Edwards	3	17	5.7

Assists

#	Player	Pld	Asts	APG
1	(New Zealand) Shea Ili	3	23	7.7
1	(Greece) Thomas Walkup	3	23	7.7
3	(Jordan) Freddy Ibrahim	3	19	6.3
4	(United States) Austin Reaves	3	13	4.3
5	(United States) Tyrese Haliburton	3	12	4.0

Blocks

#	Player	Pld	Blks	BPG
1	(Greece) Georgios Papagiannis	3	6	2.0
2	(United States) Jaren Jackson Jr.	3	5	1.7
2	(United States) Walker Kessler	3	5	1.7
4	(United States) Paolo Banchero	3	4	1.3
4	(Jordan) Ahmad Al-Dwairi	3	4	1.3
4	(United States) Tyrese Haliburton	3	4	1.3

Steals

#	Player	Pld	Stls	SPG
1	(New Zealand) Izayah Le'afa	3	6	2.0
1	(United States) Austin Reaves	3	6	2.0
2	(Greece) Thanasis Antetokounmpo	3	5	1.7
2	(United States) Tyrese Haliburton	3	5	1.7
2	(Jordan) Rondae Hollis-Jefferson	3	5	1.7
2	(Jordan) Freddy Ibrahim	3	5	1.7
2	(United States) Bobby Portis	3	5	1.7

Minutes

#	Player	Pld	Mins	MPG
1	(Jordan) Rondae Hollis-Jefferson	3	112	37.6
2	(Jordan) Freddy Ibrahim	3	102	34.0
3	(Jordan) Ahmad Al-Dwairi	3	97	32.6
4	(New Zealand) Reuben Te Rangi	3	96	32.1
5	(New Zealand) Finn Delany	3	95	32.0

Free throws

#	Player	FTM	FTA	FT%
1	(New Zealand) Shea Ili	3	16/17	94.1
2	(Greece) Giannoulis Larentzakis	3	10/12	83.3
3	(United States) Jaren Jackson Jr.	3	12/15	80.0
4	(United States) Anthony Edwards	3	11/14	78.6
5	(Jordan) Rondae Hollis-Jefferson	3	31/40	77.5

Field goal shooting

#	Player	FGM	FGA	FG%
1	(Greece) Georgios Papagiannis	15	26	57.7
2	(Jordan) Ahmad Al-Dwairi	18	32	56.3
3	(Greece) Ioannis Papapetrou	17	31	54.8
4	(Jordan) Rondae Hollis-Jefferson	25	51	49.0
5	(United States) Anthony Edwards	17	37	45.9

Efficiency

#	Player	Pld	MPG	PPG	Eff	EffPG
1	(Jordan) Rondae Hollis-Jefferson	3	37.6	27.7	78.0	26.0
2	(New Zealand) Shea Ili	3	28.9	18.0	58.0	19.3
3	(Jordan) Ahmad Al-Dwairi	3	32.6	14.0	51.0	17.0
3	(Greece) Georgios Papagiannis	3	27.9	11.0	51.0	17.0
5	(United States) Anthony Edwards	3	20.9	16.3	50.0	16.7
