= 2023 United States FIBA Basketball World Cup team =

International basketball team

The United States men's national basketball team competed at the 2023 FIBA Basketball World Cup and finished in fourth place. The team held training camp in early August and scheduled five exhibition games before their World Cup opener at the end of the month in Manila. The Americans were 4–1 during group play, qualifying for the final round. However, they lost in the semifinals and then in the bronze medal game, failing to medal for the second consecutive time. Being one of the top two World Cup finishers in the Americas zone, the team directly qualified for the 2024 Summer Olympics in Paris.

The tournament was Grant Hill's first major international tournament as president of USA Basketball, having succeeded Jerry Colangelo. Steve Kerr was the new head coach, replacing Gregg Popovich.

== Roster ==
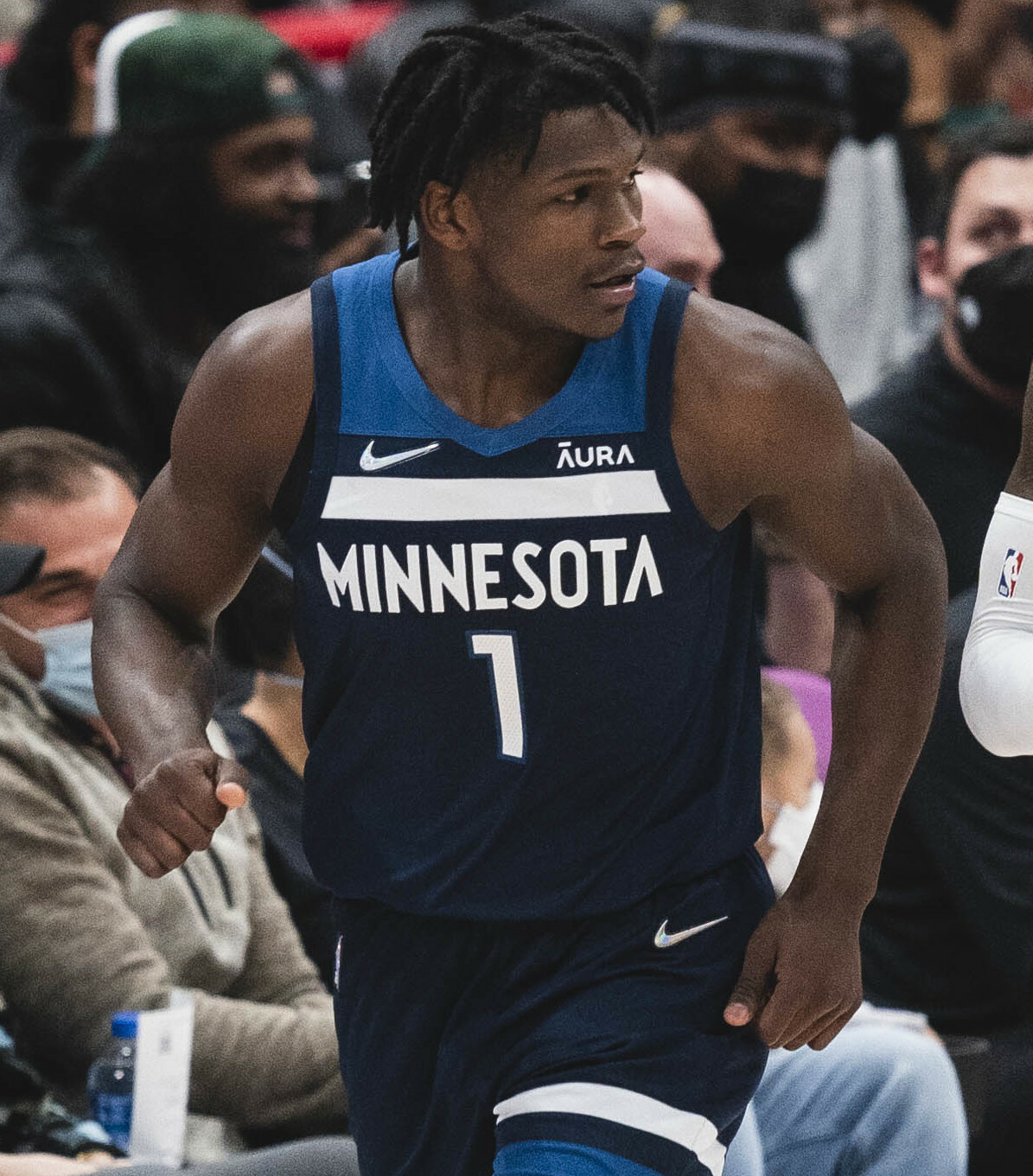
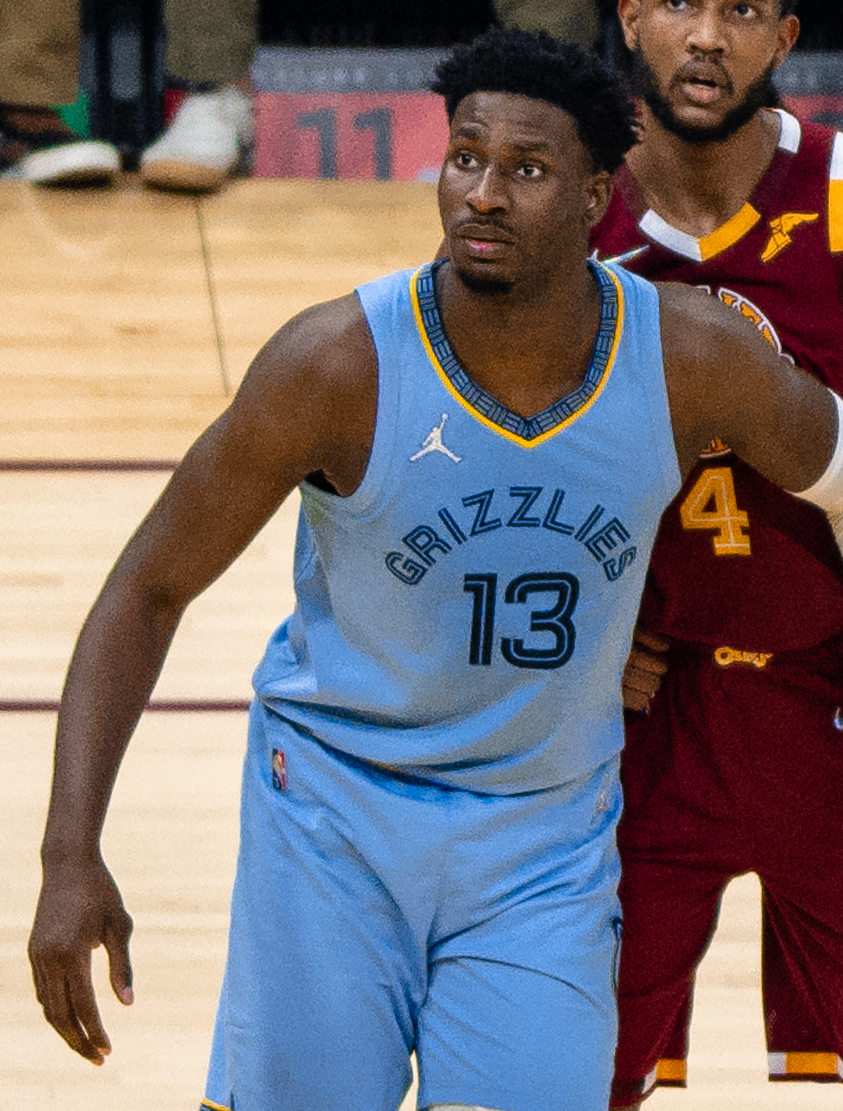
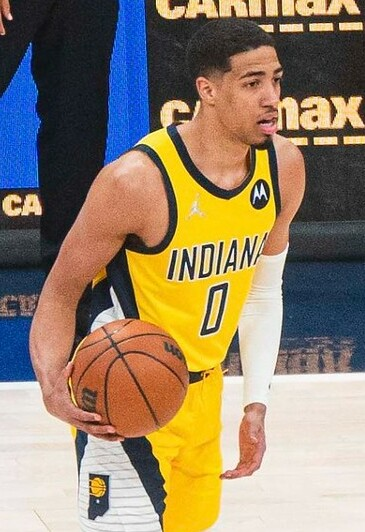
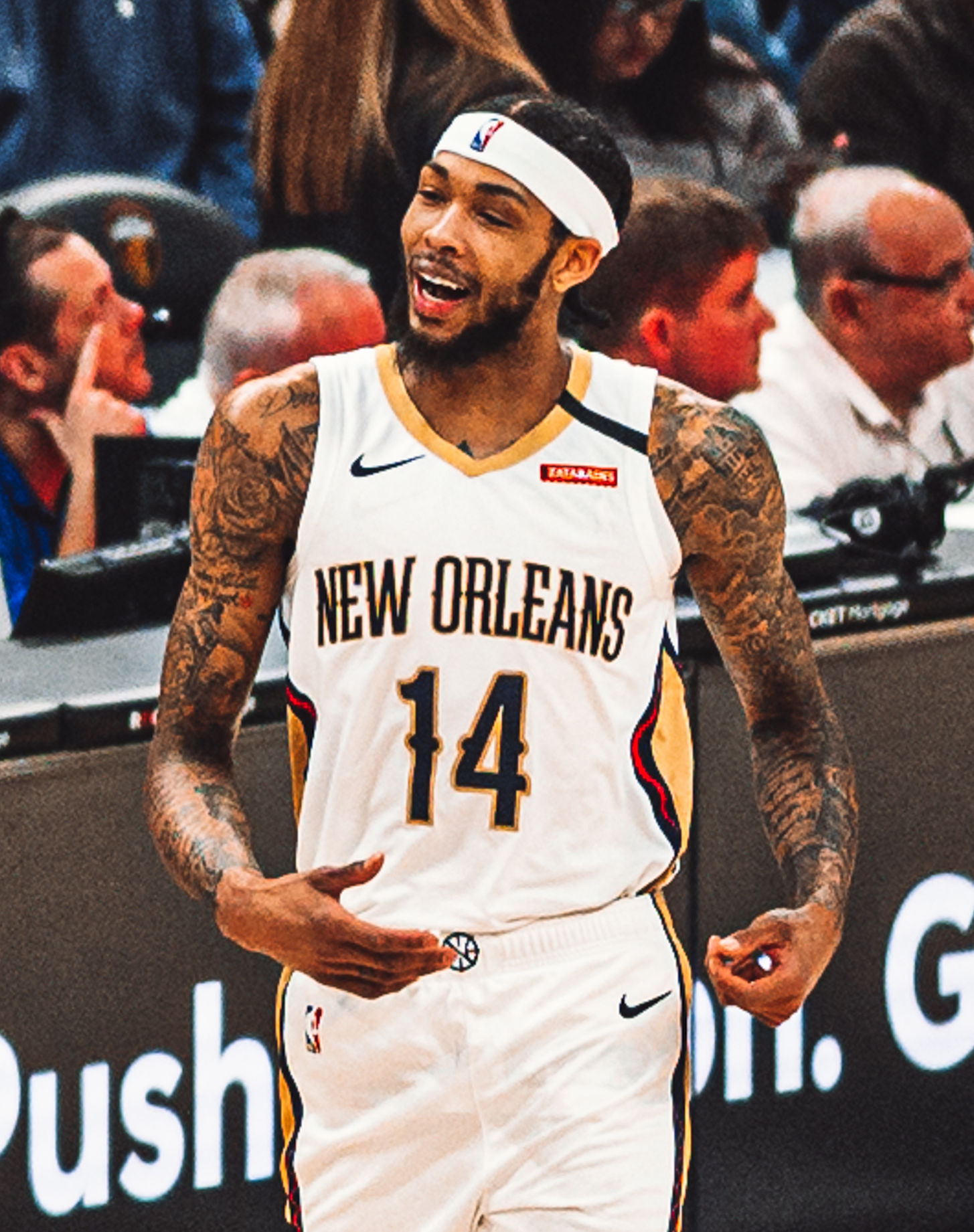
The team included four NBA All-Star players (clockwise) Anthony Edwards, Jaren Jackson Jr., Brandon Ingram and Tyrese Haliburton

The United States had won gold medals in two of the previous six World Cups, with the 2019 squad finishing in a disappointing seventh place. New USA Basketball president Grant Hill dropped the requirement established by his predecessor, Jerry Colangelo, for multi-year commitments from players to build continuity. "People's willingness and commitment to give two consecutive years to Team USA has changed, so we have to be able to adapt to the times", said Hill. Since FIBA changed the World Cup in 2019 to occur a year prior to the Olympics, players were reluctant to play for the national team two years in a row, wanting a break from the long seasons of the National Basketball Association (NBA). Roster turnover in each tournament often led to lack of chemistry for the U.S. national team, which led to more individual play instead of teamwork. Team USA did not hold a training camp in 2022, as was previously customary during an "off" summer. No pool of players was named for the national team, ending the practice of trials and cuts based on candidates' performance in camp.

The American squad consisted of players who were each capable of both dominating the game or playing a complementary, off-ball role. It was constructed by Hill and head coach Steve Kerr to be fast and flexible, and players were selected with an emphasis on length, toughness, and ability to move the ball. The team featured four NBA All-Stars—Anthony Edwards, Tyrese Haliburton, Brandon Ingram and Jaren Jackson Jr.—all with one selection each; Edwards, Haliburton, and Jackson were recent All-Stars in 2023. However, it was the first U.S. national team of NBA players without any members named to the All-NBA Team. The number of All-NBAers on its World Cup teams had been trending lower, with the rise of non-Americans on All-NBA teams and stars opting to take a break in the offseason, while U.S. Olympic teams drew more A-list players.

Team USA's centers included Jackson, the 2023 NBA Defensive Player of the Year, who mostly played power forward with the Memphis Grizzlies. Their only true center was Walker Kessler, an effective inside defender and shot blocker, who was coming off his NBA rookie year. The Americans' other forwards who could play center included Paolo Banchero, the reigning NBA Rookie of the Year, and Bobby Portis. Banchero had verbally declared that he would play for Italy before officially committing to Team USA. Other players who were long and capable of defending multiple positions include Haliburton, Mikal Bridges, Josh Hart, Cameron Johnson and Austin Reaves. Reaves committed to the United States after considering playing for Germany. He was only the third undrafted player to play on a U.S. national team of NBAers. (Note: The first two were Ben Wallace (2002 FIBA World Championship team) and Brad Miller (2006 FIBA World Championship).)

The U.S. roster did not have any previous senior national team experience; some of the players had junior-level (19 years old and under) experience. Every prior national team of NBA players had at least two players with senior-level experience. Historically, the United States had focused on younger players looking to use the World Cup as a showcase for a potential future Olympic invite. The youngest squad in the 2023 World Cup with an average age of 24.6, each player for the Americans was 28 or younger.

Kerr won five NBA championships as a player and four as head coach of the Golden State Warriors. As a college player, he won gold on the 1986 U.S. team that won the FIBA World Championship, before it became known as the World Cup. Kerr's assistants included NBA coaches Tyronn Lue and Erik Spoelstra and college coach Mark Few. At the start of training camp, Kerr had his coaching staff write down who should be in the starting lineup. This resulted in the starters in their first scrimmage being Bridges, Ingram, Jackson, Johnson and Jalen Brunson. By the second scrimmage, Edwards replaced Johnson, and the starters remained the same throughout the exhibition games.

The roster was announced on 6 July.

United States men's national basketball team – 2023 FIBA Basketball World Cup roster
Players
Coaches

Pos.	No.	Name	Age – Date of birth	Height	Club	Ctr.
G	4	Tyrese Haliburton	23 – 29 February 2000	1.96 m (6 ft 5 in)	Indiana Pacers	(United States)
F	5	Mikal Bridges	26 – 30 August 1996	1.98 m (6 ft 6 in)	Brooklyn Nets	(United States)
F	6	Cameron Johnson	27 – 3 March 1996	2.03 m (6 ft 8 in)	Brooklyn Nets	(United States)
F	7	Brandon Ingram	25 – 2 September 1997	2.03 m (6 ft 8 in)	New Orleans Pelicans	(United States)
PF	8	Paolo Banchero	20 – 12 November 2002	2.08 m (6 ft 10 in)	Orlando Magic	(United States)
C	9	Bobby Portis	28 – 10 February 1995	2.11 m (6 ft 11 in)	Milwaukee Bucks	(United States)
G	10	Anthony Edwards	22 – 5 August 2001	1.93 m (6 ft 4 in)	Minnesota Timberwolves	(United States)
PG	11	Jalen Brunson (C)	26 – 31 August 1996	1.88 m (6 ft 2 in)	New York Knicks	(United States)
SF	12	Josh Hart	28 – 6 March 1995	1.93 m (6 ft 4 in)	New York Knicks	(United States)
F	13	Jaren Jackson Jr.	23 – 15 September 1999	2.08 m (6 ft 10 in)	Memphis Grizzlies	(United States)
C	14	Walker Kessler	22 – 26 July 2001	2.13 m (7 ft 0 in)	Utah Jazz	(United States)
SG	15	Austin Reaves	25 – 29 May 1998	1.96 m (6 ft 5 in)	Los Angeles Lakers	(United States)

Head coach

- (United States) Steve Kerr

Assistant coach(es)

- (United States) Mark Few
- (United States) Tyronn Lue
- (United States) Erik Spoelstra

Legend

- (C) Team captain
- Club – describes last
  club before the competition
- Age – describes age
  on 25 August 2023

== Exhibition games ==
Team USA had one exhibition game in the United States, against Puerto Rico, before scheduled matches in Spain and the United Arab Emirates. The Americans finished 5–0, led by Anthony Edwards and his team-high 19.2 points per game on 51% shooting. They outscored their opponents by an average of 22.6 points per game, but had turnover issues in multiple contests and trailed in the second half against Spain and Germany. It was the first U.S. senior squad to go undefeated in warmup games since the 2016 Olympic team.

=== Puerto Rico ===
August 7, 2023

Boxscore

Puerto Rico	74–117	United States
Pts: Waters 17; Rebs: Conditt 6 Asts: Howard 4		Pts: Edwards, Johnson 15; Rebs: Brunson 12; Asts: Haliburton 12

Las Vegas, Nevada, US

Edwards had 15 points, four steals and four assists as the United States won 117–74 over Puerto Rico. The Americans led 50–43 at halftime before Edwards scored 11 points in the third quarter, when Team USA outscored Puerto Rico 34–18. The United States went on a 20–0 run from the end of the third to the start of the fourth quarter. Cameron Johnson scored 15 points off the bench to tie Edwards for the team high. The Americans won by 43 in spite of shooting just 6-for-27 on three-point field goals.

Starting point guard Jalen Brunson had a double-double with 11 points and 12 rebounds. Tyrese Haliburton had seven points and a game-high 12 assists, as he and Austin Reaves combined for 16 assists and only two turnovers off the bench for Team USA. Jaren Jackson Jr. had 12 points, seven rebounds and two blocks but battled with foul trouble. Somewhat unexpectedly, Paolo Banchero played significant minutes as his backup at center, at times over Bobby Portis. Banchero plays more as a forward with the Orlando Magic. U.S. head coach Steve Kerr liked his ability to push the ball in transition as a center, as Bam Adebayo did for the 2020 Olympic team.

=== Slovenia ===
August 12, 2023

Boxscore

Slovenia	62–92	United States
Pts: Glas 14; Rebs: Prepelič, Tobey 7 Asts: Samar 5		Pts: Edwards 15; Rebs: Hart, Ingram, Portis, Reaves 5 Asts: Brunson 8

Málaga, Spain

Edwards led a balanced U.S. attack, scoring 15 points in a 92–62 win over Slovenia. All-NBA guard Luka Dončić missed the game for the Slovenians as a precaution after landing awkwardly in their previous game. Brunson added 11 points and eight assists for the Americans. Josh Hart made his debut for Team USA after missing the previous game while signing a four-year contract extension with the New York Knicks. All 12 U.S. players scored.

=== Spain ===
August 13, 2023

Boxscore

Spain	88–98	United States
Pts: Aldama 14; Rebs: J. Hernangomez 7 Asts: Fernández 6		Pts: Brunson 23; Rebs: Edwards 7 Asts: Haliburton 12

Málaga, Spain

Brunson scored a game-high 23 points on a perfect 9-for-9 shooting from the field to lead the United States to a 98–88 win over Spain. The Americans led 73–72 to start the fourth quarter, but scored seven consecutive points late in the game to extend their lead to 97–84. They shot 67% overall, including 71% on 2-pointers and 56% on 3-pointers. Their defense held Spain to 42% shooting. Jackson added 14 points, five rebounds and three blocks for Team USA while playing against NBA-sized big men Santi Aldama and brothers Willy and Juancho Hernangómez.

The Americans led at halftime by 10, but committed seven turnovers in the third quarter, as the Spaniards closed the gap and took the lead with under four minutes left in the period. Edwards, the leading U.S. scorer through the first two games, scored seven of his 11 in the final quarter. Haliburton had 12 assists in slightly less than 22 minutes off the bench for the Americans. Brunson also had five assists. According to FIBA, Spain was ranked the No. 1 team in the world, and the United States was No. 2.

=== Greece ===
August 18, 2023

Boxscore

Greece	86–108	United States
Pts: Kalaitzakis, Rogkavopoulos 12; Rebs: Mitoglou 6 Asts: Mitoglou 4		Pts: Edwards 21; Rebs: Hart 9 Asts: Brunson 7

Abu Dhabi, UAE

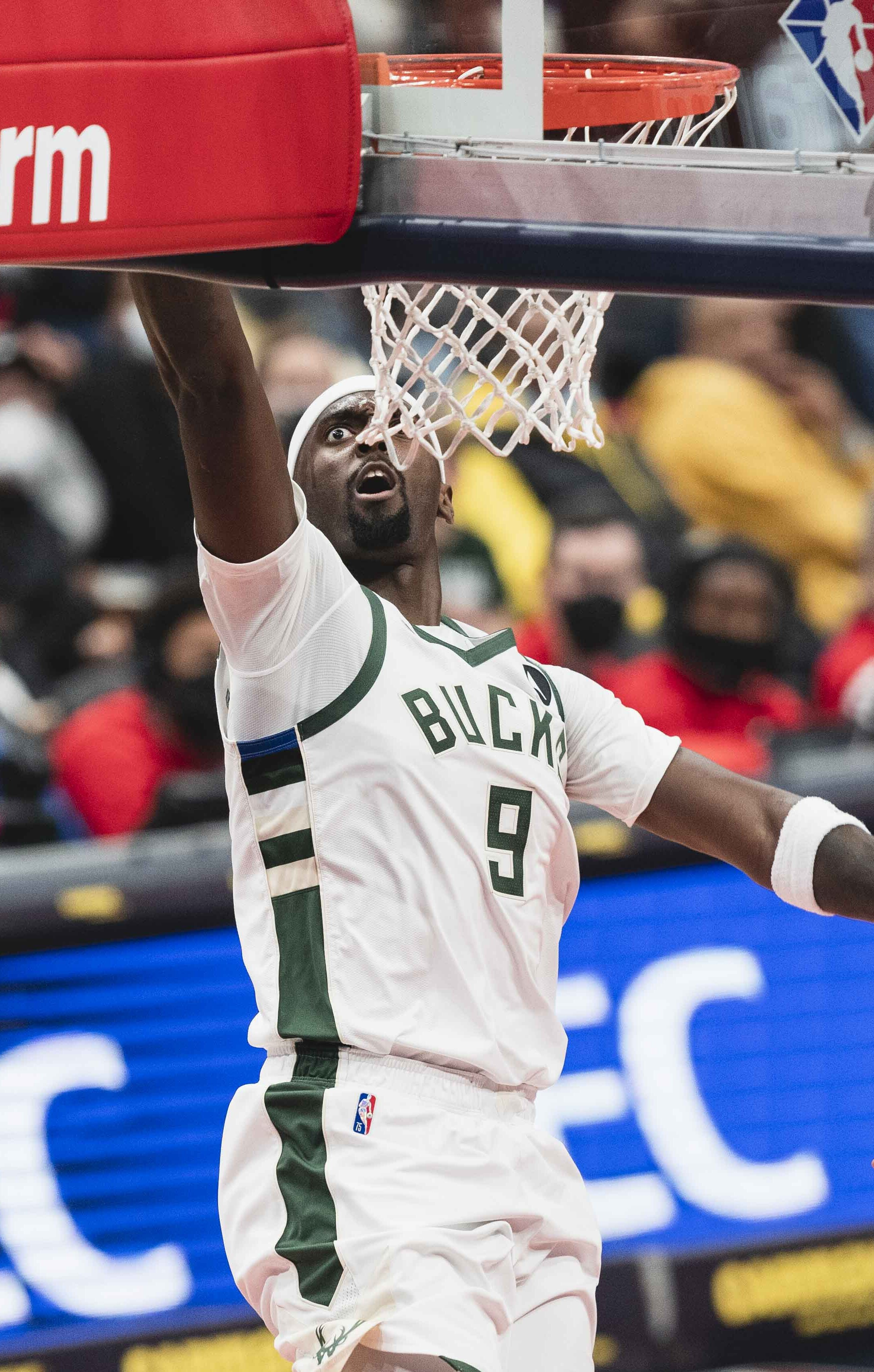
Bobby Portis was one of six Americans to score in double figures.

Edwards scored a game-high 21 points in 18 minutes in a 108–86 win over Greece. The Greeks did not have Giannis Antetokounmpo, who was unavailable for the World Cup after offseason knee surgery. Team USA led by as many as 17 in the first period, but they committed four turnovers in a span of six possessions in the second quarter, as Greece pulled to within six points. However, Edwards scored 11 points in the third quarter, including three 3's, and the United States stretched their lead to as many as 20.

Edwards shot 8-of-16 from the field for the game, and did not play in the fourth quarter. He was among six Americans to score in double figures, including starters Jackson (11 points) and Mikal Bridges (10) and reserves Johnson (13), Reaves (11) and Portis (10). Brunson led the United States with seven assists. Kerr modified his rotation, inserting Walker Kessler as the first man off the bench in the first quarter. Kessler had played the least with seven minutes through three games. He finished the game with seven points, five rebounds, four fouls and a block. Team USA had 20 turnovers in the game, which led to 24 points for Greece. The Americans outrebounded the Greeks 49–35.

=== Germany ===
August 20, 2023

Boxscore

Germany	91–99	United States
Pts: Wagner 17; Rebs: Theis 13; Asts: Schröder 10		Pts: Edwards 34; Rebs: Jackson Jr. 8 Asts: Banchero, Bridges, Brunson, Haliburton 3

Abu Dhabi, UAE

Edwards scored 34 points and his defense helped rally Team USA from a 16-point second-half deficit to win 99–91 over Germany. The Americans trailed 71–55 with 3:51 remaining in the third quarter. They rallied behind Haliburton, who scored 11 of his 16 points in the quarter, including a 3-pointer to cut the deficit to 74–71 with :56 remaining. Team USA held the Germans scoreless during a six-minute span in the fourth quarter, outscoring them 18–0. Edwards scored 12 points in the final period. Haliburton finished the game ahead of starter Brunson due to his defense and playmaking ability. Another bench player, Reaves, also finished the game and scored 16 points. Portis and Banchero were also on the floor during critical minutes.

Edwards was 11-of-21 from the field and shot a perfect 8-of-8 on free throws, adding four 3s and six rebounds. "He's unquestionably 'the guy,'" Kerr said. "I mean...he knows it, but now the team knows it and I think the fans see it." Jackson had eight rebounds and six blocks. German point guard Dennis Schröder had 16 points and 10 assists, while attacking the Americans with his speed and beating his defenders with pick and rolls. He set up his fellow NBA teammates Franz Wagner (17 points), Mo Wagner (14) and Daniel Theis (12). Germany outrebounded the United States 55–42 and had a 21–7 advantage in second-chance points. Theis had 13 rebounds and Franz Wagner had 10.

== Group phase ==
=== First round ===
Pos	Team	Pld	W	L	PF	PA	PD	Pts	Qualification
1	United States	3	3	0	318	215	+103	6	Second round
2	Greece	3	2	1	256	254	+2	5	Second round
3	New Zealand	3	1	2	241	269	−28	4	17th–32nd classification
4	Jordan	3	0	3	220	297	−77	3	17th–32nd classification

Source: FIBA
Rules for classification: Tiebreakers

The United States played in Group C with Greece, Jordan, and New Zealand. Their games were played at Mall of Asia Arena in Manila. The top two finishers advanced to the second round, where they competed against the top two finishers from Group D.

The Americans won all three of their opening games by an average margin of 34, winning each by at least 27. They were one of three teams in the World Cup to win all of their opening round games by 20 or more, joining Group H winner Canada and Group D winner Lithuania, who the United States played in their second-round finale. Edwards was Team USA's leading scorer, averaging 16.3 points per game.

All times are Philippine Standard Time (UTC+8)

==== New Zealand ====
26 August 2023
20:40

Boxscore

United States	99–72	New Zealand
Scoring by quarter: 19–18, 26–18, 31–22, 23–14
Pts: Banchero 21; Rebs: Edwards 7 Asts: Reaves 6		Pts: Te Rangi 15; Rebs: Delany, Fotu 5 Asts: Ili 5

Mall of Asia Arena, Pasay
Attendance: 10,978
Referees: Manuel Mazzoni (ITA), Boris Krejič (SLO), Park Kyoung-jin (KOR)

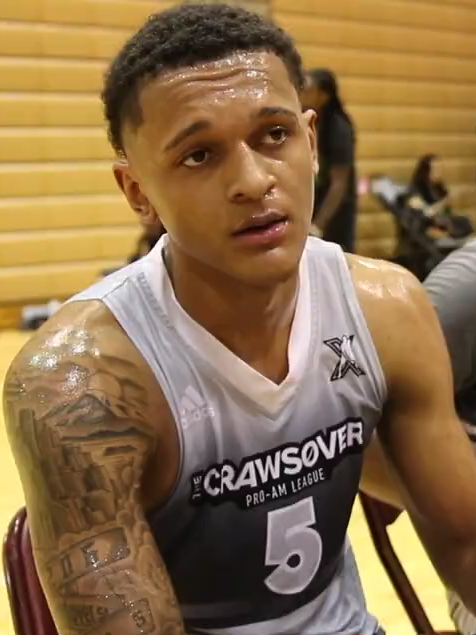
Paolo Banchero came off the bench to score a game-high 21 points.

Reaves had 12 points, six assists and three steals off the bench to help the United States overcome a sluggish start and win 99–72 over New Zealand. The Kiwis jumped out to an early 14–4 lead with 5:48 left in the first quarter, while the Americans missed five shots and committed four turnovers in their initial 11 possessions. Kerr used 10 players in the first quarter, pulling all the starters except Bridges after the first few minutes. Reaves and Haliburton came in and turned the game around. Team USA tied the game with a 12–2 run, and they went ahead for good after a 3-pointer by Haliburton with 6:58 remaining in the first half. The Americans led 45–36 at halftime after committing 10 turnovers in the first half and shooting just 3-of-10 on 3-pointers. They led by 12 with 2:01 left in the third quarter, when Banchero made consecutive 3s to expand the U.S. lead to its largest of the game at that point.

Banchero made his first six shots of the game and finished with 21 points in 19 minutes off the bench. He had a plus–minus of +22, Reaves was +19, and Haliburton was +13 along with 10 points. After four first-half turnovers, Edwards finished with 14 points and a team-leading seven rebounds. Jackson had 12 points on a perfect 4-of-4 shooting from the field and 4-of-4 on free throws, adding four rebounds before fouling out. Ingram struggled with two points on 1-of-4 shooting. Expected to be a scoring threat at power forward, he averaged 7.8 points and made only 42% of his shots during the exhibition games. New Zealand, which did not have any NBA players on its roster, were led by Reuben Te Rangi with 15 points.

==== Greece ====
28 August 2023
20:40

Boxscore

Greece	81–109	United States
Scoring by quarter: 19–23, 18–27, 19–29, 25–30
Pts: Papagiannis 17; Rebs: Antetokounmpo, Rogkavopoulos 4 Asts: Walkup 7		Pts: Reaves 15; Rebs: Hart 11; Asts: Reaves 6

Mall of Asia Arena, Pasay
Attendance: 11,392
Referees: Antonio Conde (ESP), Manuel Mazzoni (ITA), Daniel García (VEN)

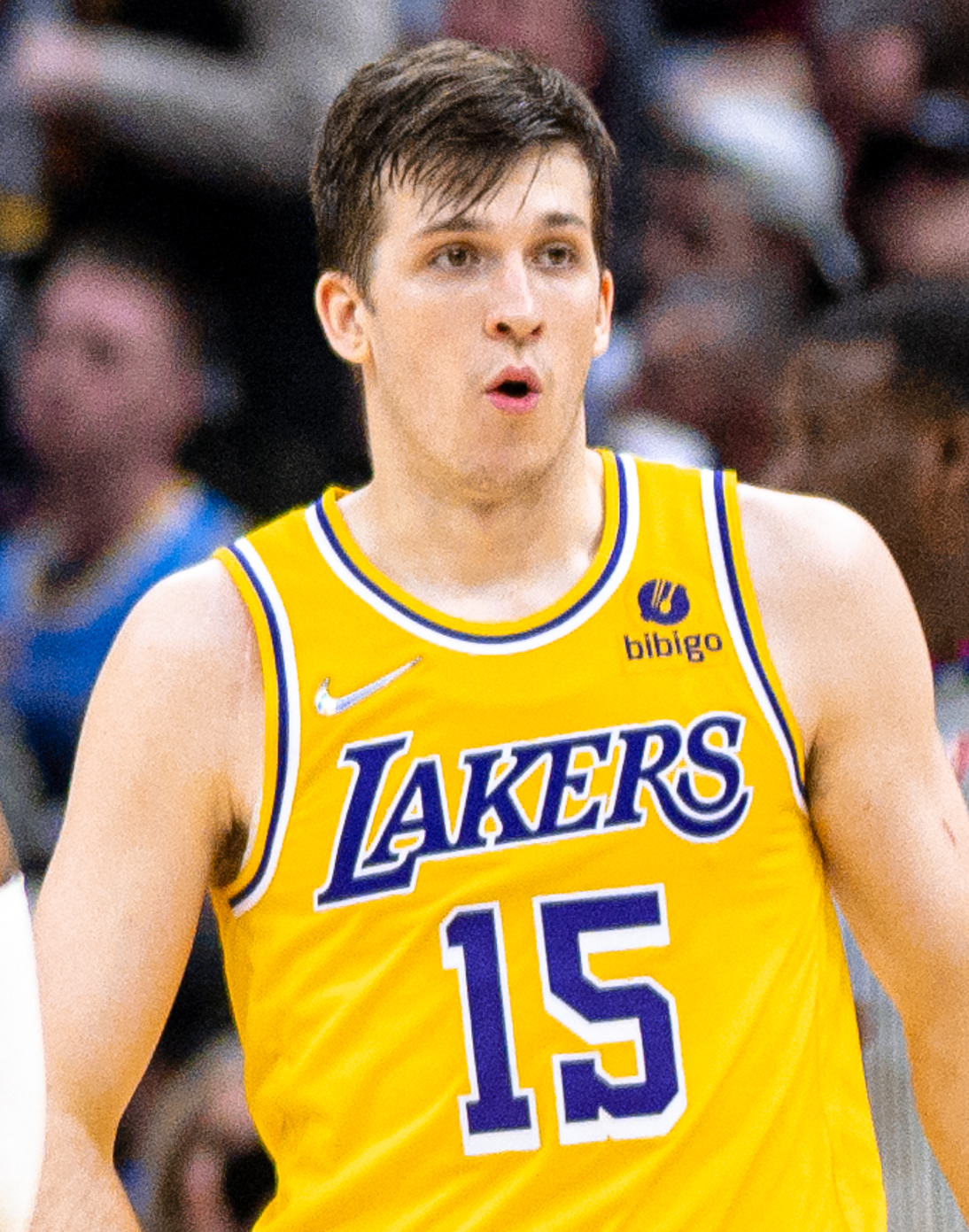
Reserve Austin Reaves had team-highs of 15 points and six assists.

Reaves had a team-high 15 points along with five rebounds and six assists in a 109–81 win over Greece, which assured the Americans that they would advance to the second round of the World Cup. Team USA again extended their lead with their reserves playing. Led once more by Reaves, the bench outscored the Greeks by 11 in the first half, compared to the starters having a +2 advantage. The starting unit quickly stretched Team USA's lead to 20 in the third quarter, and the United States led by 23 entering the fourth.

Brunson had 13 points on 5-of-5 shooting, and Edwards also scored 13 after starting the game shooting 1-of-6. Jackson had nine points, two steals and two blocks. Hart led the team in rebounding with 11 off the bench. Greek center Georgios Papagiannis, a lottery pick of the Phoenix Suns in the 2016 NBA draft, scored 11 of his 17 points in the first quarter to keep the game close early. However, Greece did not have a solution for the Americans' fast-paced bench, and the United States had a 32–6 advantage in fast-break points.

==== Jordan ====
30 August 2023
16:40

Boxscore

United States	110–62	Jordan
Scoring by quarter: 31–12, 31–21, 25–16, 23–13
Pts: Edwards 22; Rebs: Hart 12; Asts: Haliburton 6		Pts: Hollis-Jefferson 20; Rebs: Hollis-Jefferson 7 Asts: Kanaan 6

Mall of Asia Arena, Pasay
Attendance: 10,511
Referees: Takaki Kato (JPN), Kristian Paez (ECU), Péter Praksch (HUN)

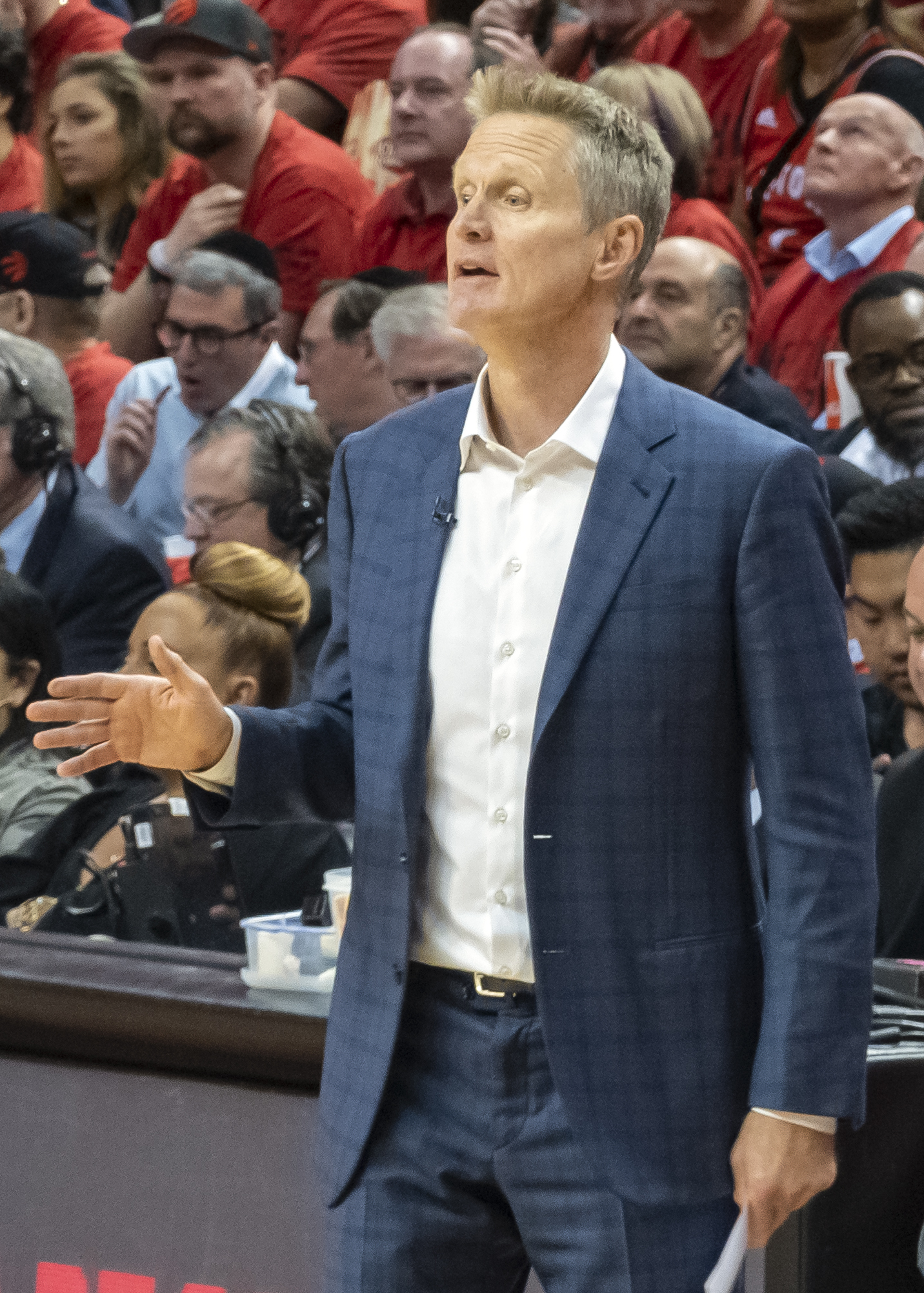
Coach Steve Kerr made his first starting lineup change, inserting Josh Hart for Brandon Ingram.

Edwards scored 22 points and Team USA won 110–62 against Jordan in their easiest win of the opening round. The United States, who went up 20–4 early, led by 19 after the first quarter and 62–33 by halftime. It was a departure from their slow starts in the first two games as well as their exhibition games, when they took control once Haliburton and Reaves came off the bench. Edwards had 18 points at the half after 13 in the opening period.

Portis scored 13 points for Team USA, Jackson added 12, and Brunson had 10. All 12 Americans scored by the end of the third quarter, and each played at least 12 minutes in the game. Edwards, who played 19 minutes, also had had eight rebounds, four assists, and three 3-pointers, as the United States outscored Jordan by 30 when he was playing. Jackson added six rebounds and two blocks. Kessler, who had received limited playing time, scored eight points and had three blocks in 12 minutes. Rondae Hollis-Jefferson, Jordan's only player with NBA experience, led his squad with 20 points and seven rebounds.

Kerr changed the starting lineup for the first time, inserting Hart for Ingram, who had struggled while being mostly a spot-up shooter. The Americans had been +10 with Ingram on the court and +45 when he was not playing. Against Jordan, he and Banchero were the first reserves to enter the game. Playing off the bench, Ingram was able to handle the ball more, which he was more accustomed to with the New Orleans Pelicans. His opportunities were more limited in the starting lineup with Brunson and Edwards, while Haliburton and Reaves moved the ball well on the second unit. Ingram seemed more comfortable, finishing with five assists and seven points in 15 minutes in his best game to date. In his new role, Hart had a team-high 12 rebounds in 18 minutes, and concentrated on defense. A tireless rebounder despite standing just 6 feet 4 inches (1.93 m), he helped bolster the team's defensive rebounding, one of their few weaknesses. He also had experience playing alongside fellow starters Bridges and Brunson, his college teammates for two seasons with Villanova.

=== Second round ===
Pos	Team	Pld	W	L	PF	PA	PD	Pts	Qualification
1	Lithuania	5	5	0	482	375	+107	10	Quarter-finals
2	United States	5	4	1	507	398	+109	9	Quarter-finals
3	Montenegro	5	3	2	397	390	+7	8	
4	Greece	5	2	3	392	419	−27	7	

Source: FIBA
Rules for classification: Tiebreakers

The playing field was reduced from 32 teams in the first round to 16 in the second. The top two teams from Group C and Group D advanced to Group J, with their records from the first round being carried over. Each team played against the two teams that they did not play in the opening round. The United States defeated Montenegro before losing to Lithuania. The Americans trailed at halftime for the first time against Montenegro. In both second-round games, they were outrebounded by a combined 92–58, surrendering 41 offensive rebounds and being outscored 39–5 on second-chance points. Their starting center, Jackson, had just one rebound and was plagued by foul trouble. It was the third consecutive global tournament in which Team USA suffered a loss, after going undefeated in Olympics or World Cups in 2008, 2010, 2012, 2014 and 2016. The Americans (4–1) and Lithuanians (5–0) finished as the group's top two teams to advance to the quarterfinals in the final round, which consisted of the top eight remaining teams.

==== Montenegro ====
1 September 2023
16:40

Boxscore

United States	85–73	Montenegro
Scoring by quarter: 19–18, 18–20, 24–17, 24–18
Pts: Edwards 17; Rebs: Ingram 5 Asts: Haliburton 6		Pts: Vučević 18; Rebs: Vučević 16; Asts: Perry 6

Mall of Asia Arena, Pasay
Attendance: 7,699
Referees: Yohan Rosso (FRA), Boris Krejič (SLO), Gatis Saliņš (LAT)

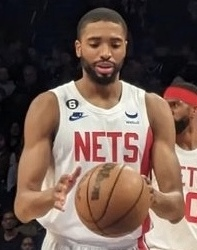
Mikal Bridges led Team USA with a plus–minus of +16.

Edwards scored all 17 of his points in the second half, helping the United States pull away late in an 85–73 win over Montenegro. The Americans trailed 11–4 early, and Montenegro led 39–38 at halftime. Team USA shot just 35% in the first half, including 1-of-9 on 3-pointers, and were outrebounded 28–17. They led 61–55 after three quarters, but the Montenegrans led as late as seven minutes left in the third, and pulled to within 64–62 with 7:15 remaining in the game. The Americans prevailed in large part due to the play of guards Edwards, Haliburton, and Reaves. Similar to their comeback win in their exhibition match against Germany, Kerr had reserves Haliburton and Reaves close out the game. Two-time NBA All-Star Nikola Vučević had 18 points and 16 rebounds for Montenegro, helping them outrebound the United States 49–31, including 23 offensive rebounds for 22 second-chance points. They held an 11-rebound edge after the first quarter.

Jackson scored 11 points, but was in early foul trouble, and did not record a rebound. Due to the success of Montenegro's front line, Kessler entered the game earlier than usual. Ingram led the team with five rebounds off the bench. Banchero and Portis, backup big men who Kerr had been using the most, each added four boards. Haliburton had 10 points, a team-high six assists and two steals, and he finished the game instead of Brunson. Reaves scored 12 points, including a 3-pointer with 2:48 remaining in the game for a 75–68 lead, its largest advantage to that point. Bridges finished with a team-high +16. Team USA finished 5-of-19 on 3s for the game, and missed 10 free throws out of 30. With pressure from Haliburton, Reaves and Hart, the United States forced 22 turnovers by Montenegro. Coupled with Lithuania's win over Greece, the Americans qualified for the quarterfinals.

==== Lithuania ====
3 September 2023
20:40

Boxscore

United States	104–110	Lithuania
Scoring by quarter: 12–31, 25–23, 28–17, 39–39
Pts: Edwards 35; Rebs: Portis 5 Asts: Brunson, Haliburton 7		Pts: Kariniauskas 15; Rebs: Sedekerskis 11; Asts: Jokubaitis 6

Mall of Asia Arena, Pasay
Attendance: 11,349
Referees: Antonio Conde (ESP), Takaki Kato (JPN), Boris Krejič (SLO)

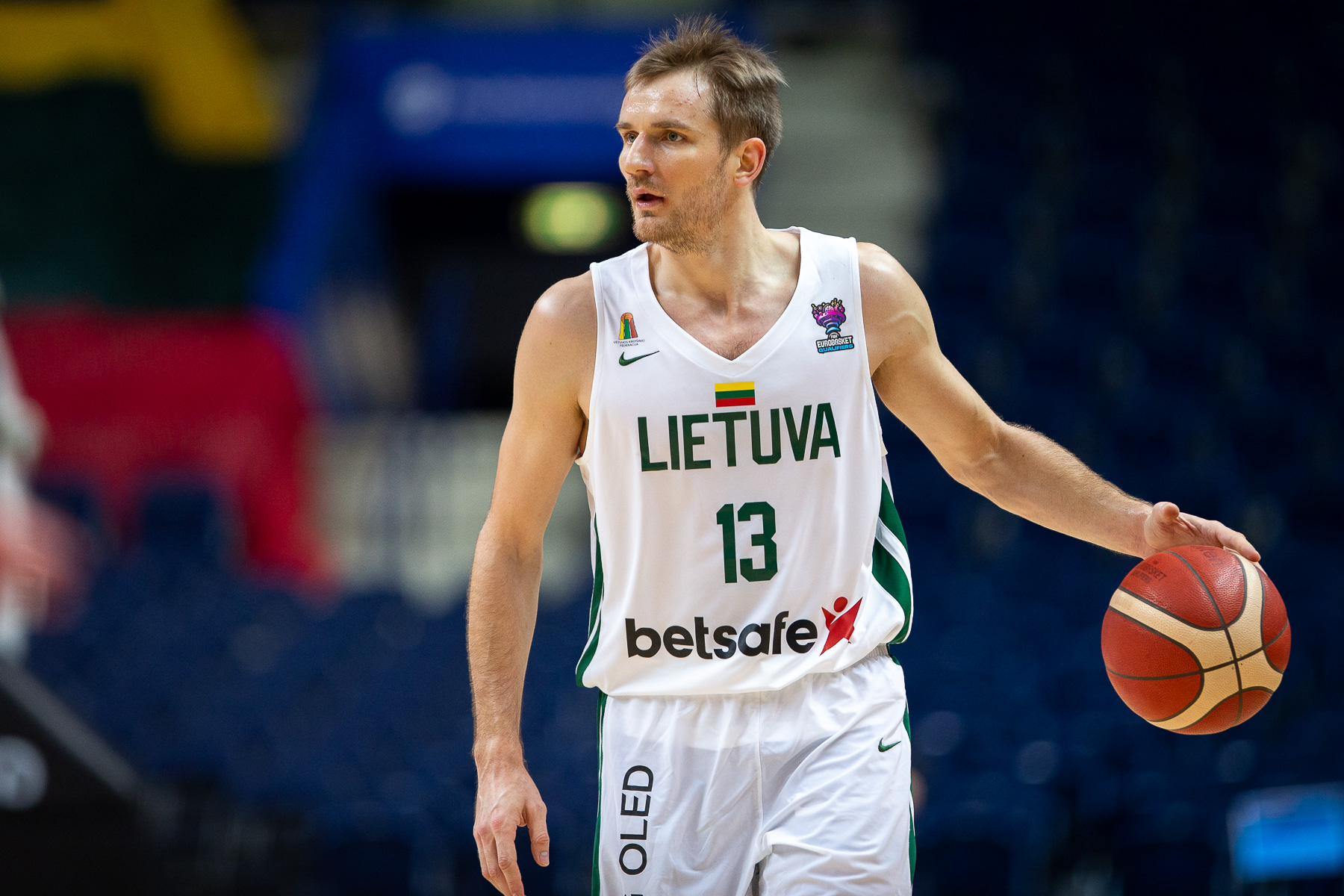
Lithuania's Vaidas Kariniauskas scored 15 points in the United States' first loss.

Vaidas Kariniauskas scored 15 points as Lithuania won 110–104, handing the United States its first loss of the World Cup. Entering the game shooting a tournament-leading 44% on 3s, the Lithuanians made their first nine 3-pointers to establish a 31–12 lead after one quarter and a 21-point advantage by early in the second. Trailing by 17 points at halftime, the Americans outscored the Lithuanians 9–0 to begin the second half, part of a 15–2 run over a 4:16 span to cut the lead to four. The United States was within 71–65 entering the fourth quarter, but Lithuania led for the remainder of the game. Brunson made two free throws with 16.2 seconds remaining to bring Team USA within four. They stole the subsequent inbounds pass, but Bridges missed a 3-pointer from the corner. Lithuania, which had also been the World Cup's top rebounding team, outrebounded the United States 43–27, including 18 offensive rebounds for 17 second-chance points. Both teams had already clinched a spot in the quarterfinals, and the game's outcome only impacted seeding. After losses by Brazil, Puerto Rico and the Dominican Republic, Team USA also qualified for the 2024 Olympics as one of the top two World Cup finishers from the Americas.

Edwards led the Americans with 35 points, three short of Kevin Durant's U.S. World Cup scoring record. Brunson and Bridges added 14, and Ingram had 10. Jackson got into foul trouble with two fouls in the first three minutes, and picked up his third in the middle of the second quarter. His only rebound was in the middle of the third quarter, and he fouled out in the fourth. The United States was +16 in the 15 minutes that he played and -22 when he was on the bench. Kerr tried without success to play Kessler with another big man in the first half, before returning to a smaller frontcourt in the second half. Reaves has his worst game to date of the tournament, fouling out with seven points in 13 minutes. He was targeted on defense by the Lithuanians, who posted him up with larger players.

Jonas Valančiūnas, Lithuania's only NBA player, had 12 points and seven rebounds. The Lithuanians started three players 6-foot-9-inch (2.06 m) or taller, with others on the bench. Several were former NBA players. Their team had seven players score in double figures, and two others had nine points each. Lithuania shot 14-of-25 on 3s, including several tough shots, while the United States was 11-of-29. Lithuania had nine players make at least one 3-pointer.

== Final round ==
Fifth place
9 September
Latvia	98
Lithuania	63
Seventh place
9 September
Italy	85
Slovenia	89

5th–8th classification
7 September
Italy	82
Latvia	87
7 September
Lithuania	100
Slovenia	84

Quarter-finals
5 September
Italy	63
United States	100
6 September
Germany	81
Latvia	79
5 September
Lithuania	68
Serbia	87
6 September
Canada	100
Slovenia	89

Semi-finals
8 September
United States	111
Germany	113
8 September
Serbia	95
Canada	86

Final
10 September
Germany	83
Serbia	77
Third place game
10 September
United States	118
Canada (OT)	127

The United States advanced to the final round in which the top two teams from the respective second-round groups qualified in the single-elimination tournament.

=== Quarterfinals – Italy ===
5 September 2023
20:40

Boxscore

Italy	63–100	United States
Scoring by quarter: 14–24, 10–22, 20–37, 19–17
Pts: Fontecchio 18; Rebs: Melli 9 Asts: Tonut 5		Pts: Bridges 24; Rebs: Bridges, Portis 7 Asts: Haliburton 5

Mall of Asia Arena, Pasay
Attendance: 9,764
Referees: Julio Anaya (PAN), Ademir Zurapović (BIH), Juan Fernández (ARG)

Bridges scored 24 points in a 100–63 win over Italy, as Team USA advanced to the medal round. The Americans were leading 10–8 in the first quarter when the second unit came in and expanded the lead to 24–14 after the first quarter. They were up 46–24 by halftime. It was Italy's worst loss in a global tournament in nearly 55 years. The United States held them to 31% shooting and just 18% (7-of-38) on 3-pointers.

Haliburton scored 18 points on six 3-pointers and led the team with five assists. Reaves added 12 points. For the third straight game, Jackson was in foul trouble early, with two fouls in the first 2:14. Team USA outrebounded Italy 51–33. NBA forward Simone Fontecchio had 18 points to lead Italy.

=== Semifinals – Germany ===
8 September 2023
20:40

Boxscore

United States	111–113	Germany
Scoring by quarter: 31–33, 29–26, 24–35, 27–19
Pts: Edwards 23; Rebs: Edwards 8 Asts: Haliburton 8		Pts: Obst 24; Rebs: Theis, Voigtmann 7 Asts: Schröder 9

Mall of Asia Arena, Pasay
Attendance: 11,011
Referees: Antonio Conde (ESP), Boris Krejič (SLO), Gatis Saliņš (LAT)

Andreas Obst scored 24 points and Franz Wagner had 22 as Germany won 113–111 to oust the United States from gold medal contention. The Americans shot 58% for the game, but allowed the Germans to make 58% as well. Germany outscored Team USA 35–24 in the third quarter and were up by 10 in the middle of the fourth. Twice the United States pulled to within one point in the closing minutes. Germany entered as the last remaining unbeaten team in the World Cup. They led for about 30 minutes of the game, compared to 4 1/2 by the Americans.

Germany took advantage of Team USA's smaller lineup with 12 offensive rebounds compared to seven for the Americans, leading to a 25–8 edge in second-chance points. They also shot an excellent 13-of-30 on 3-pointers. Edwards had 23 points for the United States and Reaves scored 21. Ingram missed the game with a respiratory illness.

=== Third place – Canada ===
10 September 2023
16:30

Boxscore

United States	118–127 (OT)	Canada
Scoring by quarter: 25–34, 31–24, 26–33, 29–20, Overtime: 7–16
Pts: Edwards 24; Rebs: Bridges 9 Asts: Haliburton 7		Pts: Brooks 39; Rebs: Barrett, Powell 7 Asts: Gilgeous-Alexander 12

Mall of Asia Arena, Pasay
Attendance: 10,666
Referees: Julio Anaya (PAN), Takaki Kato (JPN), Antonio Conde (ESP)

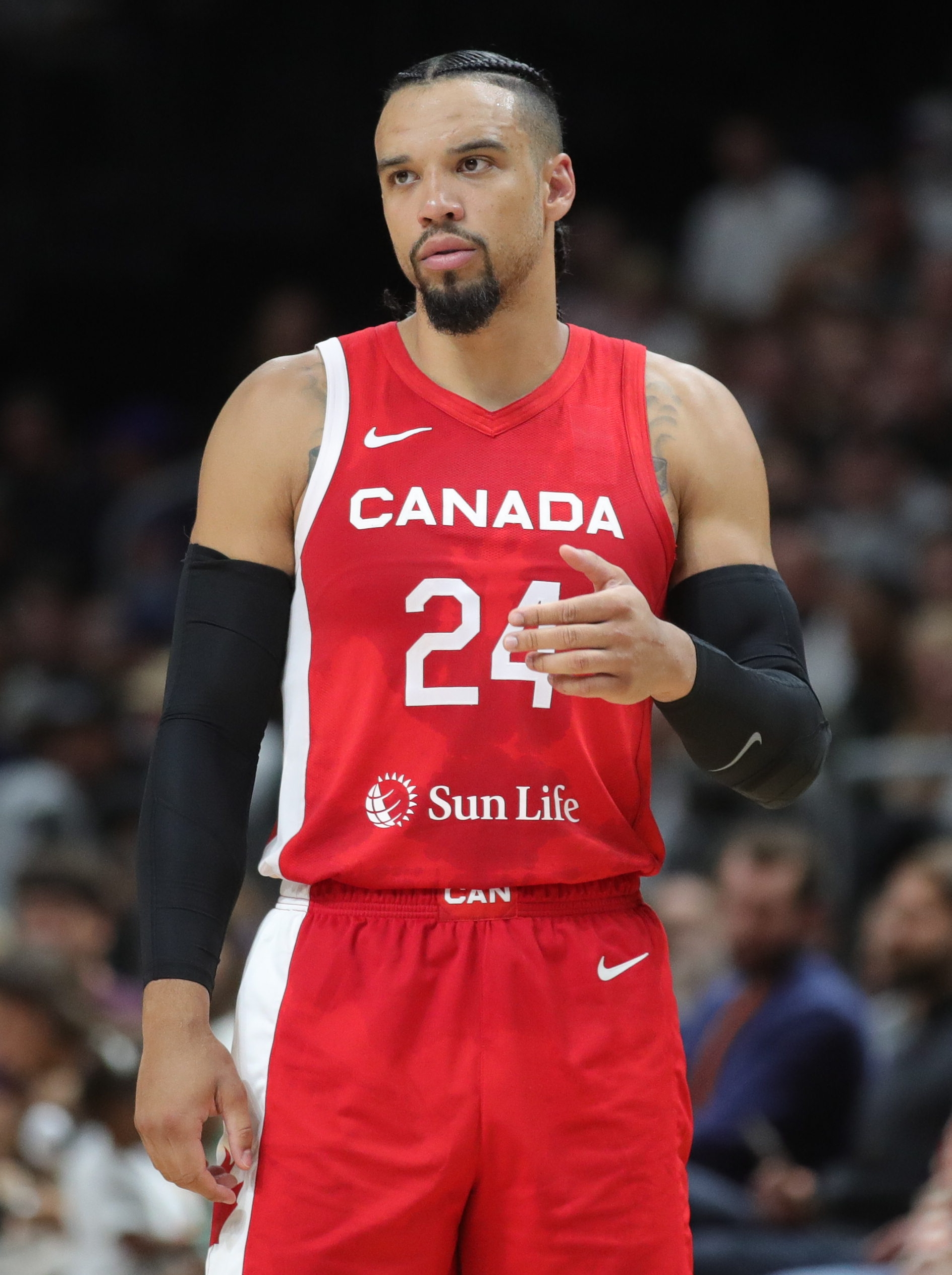
Dillon Brooks scored 39 points as Canada won the bronze medal.

Canada's Dillon Brooks scored 39 points and Shai Gilgeous-Alexander had 31 points and 12 assists to lead the Canadians to the bronze medal in a 127–118 overtime win over the Americans. It was their first medal in a global men's basketball tournament in 87 years. The United States came back from a 10-point deficit in the fourth quarter. They were down by four with 4.2 seconds in regulation when Bridges made his first free throw before intentionally missing the second, which he rebounded in the right corner before making a 3-pointer with 0.6 seconds left. In overtime, Canada scored the first five points and never trailed. Team USA played without Jackson, Banchero, and Ingram due to illness. It was the first World Cup or Olympics that they surrendered 100 or more points in three games; they were 0–3 in those contests.

Canada outshot the United States on 3-pointers, 17 of 37 (46%) versus 10 of 27 (37%). Their last medal at a global tournament was silver at the 1936 Olympics. Edwards scored 24 points for the Americans and Reaves added 23. The United States failed to medal at consecutive World Cups for the first time since 1967 and 1970. Their last team to lose three games in a global tournament was the 2004 Olympic team.
