= 2023 FIBA Basketball World Cup Group D =

International basketball results

Group D was one of eight groups of the preliminary round of the 2023 FIBA Basketball World Cup. It took place from 25 to 29 August 2023, and consisted of Egypt, Lithuania, Mexico, and Montenegro. Each team played each other once, for a total of three games per team, with all games played at the Mall of Asia Arena, Pasay, Philippines. The top two teams advanced to the second round and the bottom two teams qualified for the classification rounds.

== Teams ==
Team	Qualification		Appearance			Best performance	WR
Team	As	Date	Last	Total	Streak	Best performance	WR
Egypt	African Group F top two	24 February 2023	2014	7	1	5th place (1950)	55
Mexico	Americas Group F top three	26 February 2023	2014	6	1	8th place (1967)	31
Montenegro	European Group K top three	26 February 2023	2019	2	2	25th place (2019)	18
Lithuania	European Group K top three	14 November 2022	2019	6	5	3rd place (2010)	8

== Standings ==
Pos	Team	Pld	W	L	PF	PA	PD	Pts	Qualification
1	Lithuania	3	3	0	280	204	+76	6	Second round
2	Montenegro	3	2	1	251	236	+15	5	Second round
3	Egypt	3	1	2	241	254	−13	4	17th–32nd classification
4	Mexico	3	0	3	209	287	−78	3	17th–32nd classification

Source: FIBA
Rules for classification: Tiebreakers

== Games ==
All times are local (UTC+8).

=== Mexico vs. Montenegro ===
This was the first competitive game between Mexico and Montenegro.

25 August 2023
16:45

Boxscore

Mexico	71–91	Montenegro
Scoring by quarter: 19–19, 20–29, 19–20, 13–23
Pts: Cruz 16; Rebs: Jaimes 8 Asts: Stoll 7		Pts: Vučević 27; Rebs: Vučević 10; Asts: Perry 7

Mall of Asia Arena, Pasay
Attendance: 6,668
Referees: Manuel Mazzoni (ITA), Daniel García (VEN), Kristian Paez (ECU)

=== Egypt vs. Lithuania ===
This was the first competitive game between Egypt and Lithuania.

25 August 2023
20:30

Boxscore

Egypt	67–93	Lithuania
Scoring by quarter: 12–26, 22–20, 19–24, 14–23
Pts: Marei 14; Rebs: Marei 9 Asts: three players 3		Pts: Normantas 18; Rebs: Valančiūnas 10; Asts: Brazdeikis 5

Mall of Asia Arena, Pasay
Attendance: 7,229
Referees: Antonio Conde (ESP), Péter Praksch (HUN), Carlos Vélez (COL)

=== Montenegro vs. Egypt ===
This was the first competitive game between Montenegro and Egypt.

27 August 2023
16:45

Boxscore

Montenegro	89–74	Egypt
Scoring by quarter: 27–17, 24–20, 19–19, 19–18
Pts: Vučević 16; Rebs: Radončić, Vučević 7 Asts: Perry 7		Pts: Amin 26; Rebs: Gardner 8 Asts: Gendy 4

Mall of Asia Arena, Pasay
Attendance: 3,751
Referees: Antonio Conde (ESP), Takaki Kato (JPN), Andris Aunkrogers (LAT)

=== Lithuania vs. Mexico ===
This was the second game between Lithuania and Mexico in the World Cup. The Lithuanians won in 2014, which was the last competitive game between the two teams.

27 August 2023
20:30

Boxscore

Lithuania	96–66	Mexico
Scoring by quarter: 32–17, 21–17, 23–17, 20–15
Pts: Jokubaitis, Valančiūnas 15; Rebs: Valančiūnas 12; Asts: Jokubaitis 7		Pts: Girón 13; Rebs: Ibarra, Jaimes 6 Asts: Jaimes 4

Mall of Asia Arena, Pasay
Attendance: 5,503
Referees: Manuel Mazzoni (ITA), Boris Krejič (SLO), Kristian Paez (ECU)

=== Egypt vs. Mexico ===
This was the first competitive game between Egypt and Mexico.

29 August 2023
16:45

Boxscore

Egypt	100–72	Mexico
Scoring by quarter: 30–16, 29–19, 18–21, 23–16
Pts: Amin 22; Rebs: Marei 10; Asts: Amin 10		Pts: Cruz, Ibarra 21; Rebs: Jaimes 6 Asts: Stoll 14

Mall of Asia Arena, Pasay
Attendance: 4,448
Referees: Antonio Conde (ESP), Daniel García (VEN), Park Kyoung-jin (KOR)

=== Montenegro vs. Lithuania ===
This was the first game between Montenegro and Lithuania at the World Cup. The Lithuanians went 2–0 in their head-to-head matchups in the second round of the 2023 FIBA Basketball World Cup European Qualifiers.

29 August 2023
20:30

Boxscore

Montenegro	71–91	Lithuania
Scoring by quarter: 27–26, 13–22, 10–18, 21–25
Pts: Vučević 19; Rebs: Simonović 6 Asts: six players 2		Pts: Jokubaitis 19; Rebs: Sedekerskis 11; Asts: Jokubaitis 6

Mall of Asia Arena, Pasay
Attendance: 5,707
Referees: Boris Krejič (SLO), Kristian Paez (ECU), Manuel Attard (ITA)

== Statistical leaders ==
=== Player tournament average ===
Points

#	Player	Pld	Pts	PPG
1	(Montenegro) Nikola Vučević	3	62	20.7
2	(Egypt) Ehab Amin	3	58	19.3
3	(Mexico) Francisco Cruz	3	47	15.7
4	(Mexico) Joshua Ibarra	3	43	14.3
5	(Lithuania) Jonas Valančiūnas	3	41	13.7

Rebounds

#	Player	Pld	Rebs	RPG
1	(Lithuania) Jonas Valančiūnas	3	36	12.0
2	(Lithuania) Tadas Sedekerskis	3	21	7.0
2	(Montenegro) Nikola Vučević	3	21	7.0
4	(Mexico) Fabián Jaimes	3	20	6.7
4	(Egypt) Assem Marei	3	20	6.7

Assists

#	Player	Pld	Asts	APG
1	(Mexico) Paul Stoll	3	24	8.0
2	(Lithuania) Rokas Jokubaitis	3	16	5.3
2	(Montenegro) Kendrick Perry	3	16	5.3
4	(Egypt) Ehab Amin	3	15	5.0
5	(Mexico) Francisco Cruz	3	14	4.7

Blocks

#	Player	Pld	Blks	BPG
1	(Egypt) Anas Mahmoud	3	6	2.0
1	(Montenegro) Nikola Vučević	3	6	2.0
3	(Lithuania) Mindaugas Kuzminskas	3	3	1.0
3	(Lithuania) Tadas Sedekerskis	3	3	1.0
5	(Mexico) Gael Bonilla	3	2	0.7
5	(Mexico) Joshua Ibarra	3	2	0.7
5	(Lithuania) Donatas Motiejūnas	3	2	0.7
5	(Lithuania) Jonas Valančiūnas	3	2	0.7

Steals

#	Player	Pld	Stls	SPG
1	(Mexico) Paul Stoll	3	8	2.7
2	(Egypt) Ehab Amin	3	6	2.0
2	(Montenegro) Petar Popović	3	6	2.0
4	(Montenegro) Kendrick Perry	3	5	1.7
4	(Montenegro) Nikola Vučević	3	5	1.7

Minutes

#	Player	Pld	Mins	MPG
1	(Egypt) Ehab Amin	3	101	33.8
2	(Mexico) Francisco Cruz	3	93	31.0
3	(Mexico) Paul Stoll	3	88	29.3
4	(Mexico) Gabriel Girón	3	84	28.2
5	(Montenegro) Nikola Vučević	3	83	28.0

Free throws

#	Player	FTM	FTA	FT%
1	(Montenegro) Nikola Vučević	3	15/15	100.0
2	(Egypt) Ehab Amin	3	12/14	85.7
3	(Lithuania) Mindaugas Kuzminskas	3	7/9	77.8
4	(Montenegro) Nikola Ivanović	3	10/13	76.9
5	(Egypt) Patrick Gardner	3	7/10	70.0

Field goal shooting
#	Player	FGM	FGA	FG%
1	(Lithuania) Jonas Valančiūnas	17	28	60.7
2	(Montenegro) Nikola Vučević	22	38	57.9
3	(Lithuania) Rokas Jokubaitis	14	28	50.0
3	(Egypt) Assem Marei	12	24	50.0
5	(Mexico) Joshua Ibarra	18	37	48.6

Efficiency
#	Player	Pld	MPG	PPG	Eff	EffPG
1	(Montenegro) Nikola Vučević	3	28.0	20.7	79.0	26.3
2	(Egypt) Ehab Amin	3	33.8	19.3	55.0	18.3
3	(Lithuania) Mindaugas Kuzminskas	3	17.7	12.7	52.0	17.3
4	(Egypt) Anas Mahmoud	3	22.9	11.3	46.0	15.3
5	(Montenegro) Kendrick Perry	3	25.9	13.3	44.0	14.7
