= Anthony Edwards (basketball) =

American basketball player (born 2001)

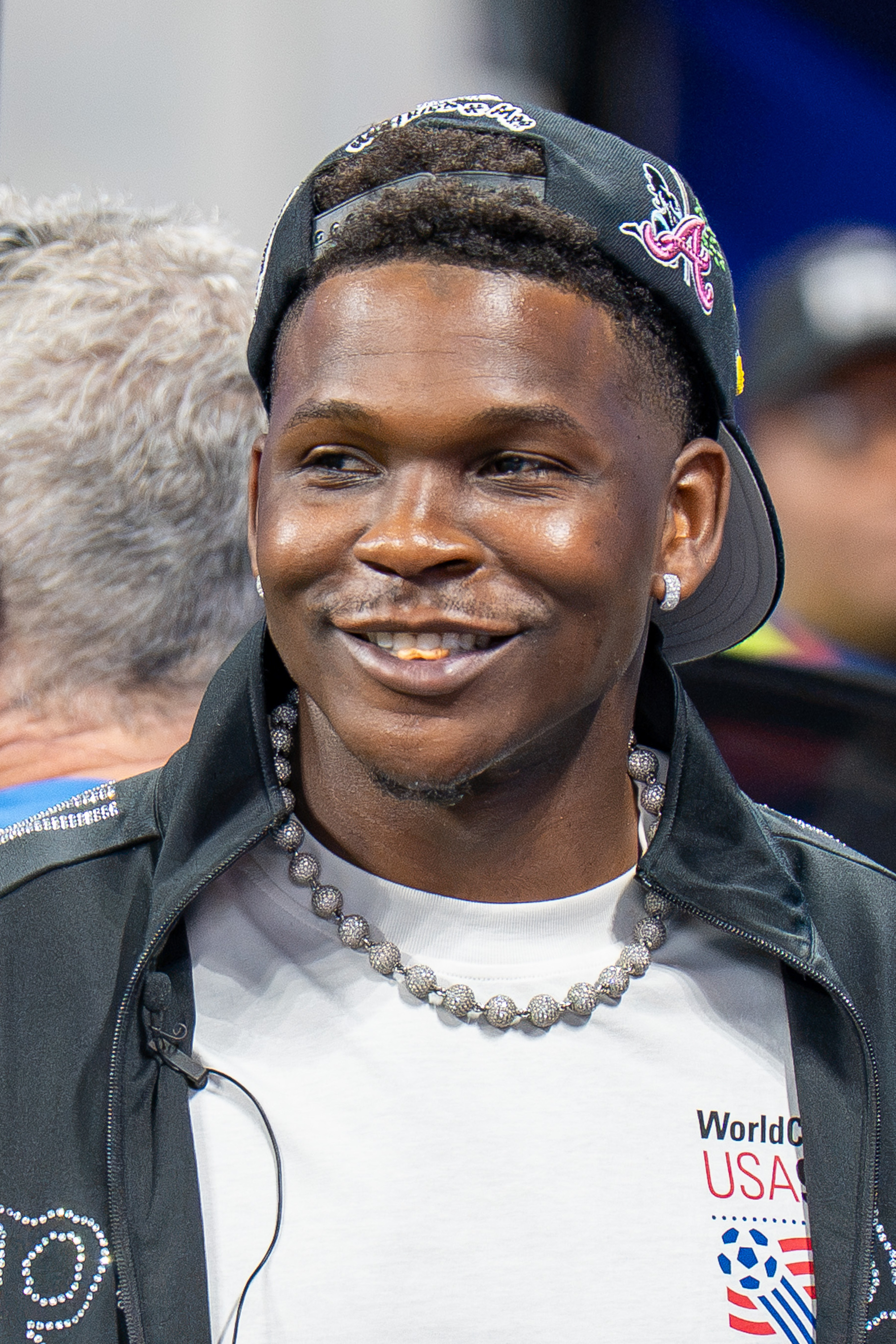
- Edwards in 2026

No. 5 – Minnesota Timberwolves
- Position: Shooting guard
- League: NBA

Personal information
- Born: August 5, 2001 (age 25) Atlanta, Georgia, U.S.
- Listed height: 6 ft 4 in (1.93 m)
- Listed weight: 225 lb (102 kg)

Career information
- High school: Daniel McLaughlin Therrell (Atlanta, Georgia); Holy Spirit Prep (Atlanta, Georgia)
- College: Georgia (2019–2020)
- NBA draft: 2020: 1st round, 1st overall pick
- Drafted by: Minnesota Timberwolves
- Playing career: 2020–present

Career history
- 2020–present: Minnesota Timberwolves

Career highlights
- 4× NBA All-Star (2023–2026); NBA All-Star Game MVP (2026); 2× All-NBA Second Team (2024, 2025); NBA All-Rookie First Team (2021); Second-team All-SEC (2020); SEC Rookie of the Year (2020); McDonald's All-American (2019)
- Stats at NBA.com
- Stats at Basketball Reference
Medals
Men's basketball
Representing the United States
Olympic Games
Gold medal – first place	2024 Paris	Team

Anthony Jermal Edwards (born August 5, 2001), nicknamed "Ant-Man" or simply "Ant", is an American professional basketball player for the Minnesota Timberwolves of the National Basketball Association (NBA). A shooting guard, Edwards played college basketball for the Georgia Bulldogs and was selected with the first overall pick by the Timberwolves in the 2020 NBA draft. He is a four-time NBA All-Star, a two-time All-NBA Second Team selection, and won a gold medal on the 2024 U.S. Olympic team.

Edwards finished his high school career at Holy Spirit Preparatory School in his hometown of Atlanta, Georgia, where he was rated a consensus five-star recruit and one of the best players in the 2019 class by major recruiting services. As a senior, he earned McDonald's All-American and USA Today All-USA first team honors. He committed to play college basketball for Georgia, becoming the highest-rated recruit to do so, and was named SEC Freshman of the Year after his freshman season with the team.

== Early life ==
Edwards spent his early life in Oakland City, Atlanta, Georgia. When he was three years old, he was given the nickname "Ant-Man" by his father. For much of his childhood, Edwards played football in the running back, quarterback, and cornerback positions. He played youth football for the Atlanta Vikings and became one of the best Pop Warner running backs in the country by age 10. Edwards switched his focus to basketball because he "thought it looked more fun" after watching his brothers play the sport. He often played basketball with his brothers at their grandmother's house. Entering ninth grade, he began training with Justin Holland, a former college basketball player for Liberty and an Atlanta-based basketball trainer.

Edwards's mother, Yvette, and grandmother, Shirley, both died of cancer during an eight-month span in 2015, when he was in eighth grade. He has worn the No. 5 basketball jersey since high school to honor them, as they both died on the fifth day of the month. After their deaths, Edwards was raised by his sister, Antoinette, and brother, Antoine, who shared legal custody of him. In high school, Edwards frequently worked as an instructor at youth camps. He intended to major in marketing while attending the University of Georgia.

During his childhood, Edwards also starred in baseball, often acting as his team's fourth or fifth hitter in the batting order. He has jokingly said he was very skilled at a variety of sports when he was younger. He owns two dogs and has also expressed his affinity for lions, although he does not believe he has the requisite space to care for one.

== High school ==
Due to his success with the Atlanta Xpress 15-under Amateur Athletic Union team, Edwards was considered a four-star recruit by Rivals in 2016. He began playing high school basketball for Therrell High School in Atlanta as a member of the 2019 class. In early January 2017, Edwards transferred to Holy Spirit Preparatory School in Atlanta and reclassified to the 2020 class. He made the move in an effort to improve his academic performance, since Holy Spirit Preparatory had "small class sizes and support to help that."

In March 2018, Edwards helped Holy Spirit Preparatory defeat The Heritage School for the Georgia Independent School Association (GISA) Class AAA state championship. He reclassified back to the 2019 class in November 2018 after seeing academic improvement. As a result, Edwards rose to become the number one recruit in the Top247 rankings by recruiting website 247Sports. In his senior season, his team finished as GISA Class AAA runners-up to The Heritage School, despite 27 points from Edwards. At the end of the season, he was averaging 29 points, nine rebounds, and two assists per game. Edwards garnered USA Today All-USA first team recognition. He played in the McDonald's All-American Game and Jordan Brand Classic in March and April 2019, respectively.

=== Recruiting ===
By consensus among major recruiting services 247Sports, ESPN, and Rivals, Edwards was rated a five-star recruit, top-five player, and the top shooting guard in the 2019 class. On February 11, 2019, he committed to play college basketball for Georgia, becoming the program's best recruit in the modern recruiting era. Edwards chose the Bulldogs over offers from Florida State, Kansas, Kentucky, and North Carolina. He was drawn to Georgia because two of his favorite players, Dwyane Wade and Victor Oladipo, had been coached in college by head coach Tom Crean.

College recruiting
Name	Hometown	School	Height	Weight	Commit date
Anthony Edwards; SG	Atlanta, GA	Holy Spirit Prep (GA)	6 ft 4 in (1.93 m)	205 lb (93 kg)	Feb 11, 2019
Anthony Edwards; SG	Recruit ratings: Rivals: 247Sports: ESPN: (96)				
Overall recruit ranking: Rivals: 3 247Sports: 1 ESPN: 4
Note: In many cases, Scout, Rivals, 247Sports, On3, and ESPN may conflict in their listings of height and weight.; In these cases, the average was taken. ESPN grades are on a 100-point scale.; Sources: "Georgia 2019 Basketball Commitments". Rivals.; "2019 Georgia Bulldogs Recruiting Class". ESPN.; "2019 Team Ranking". Rivals.

== College career ==
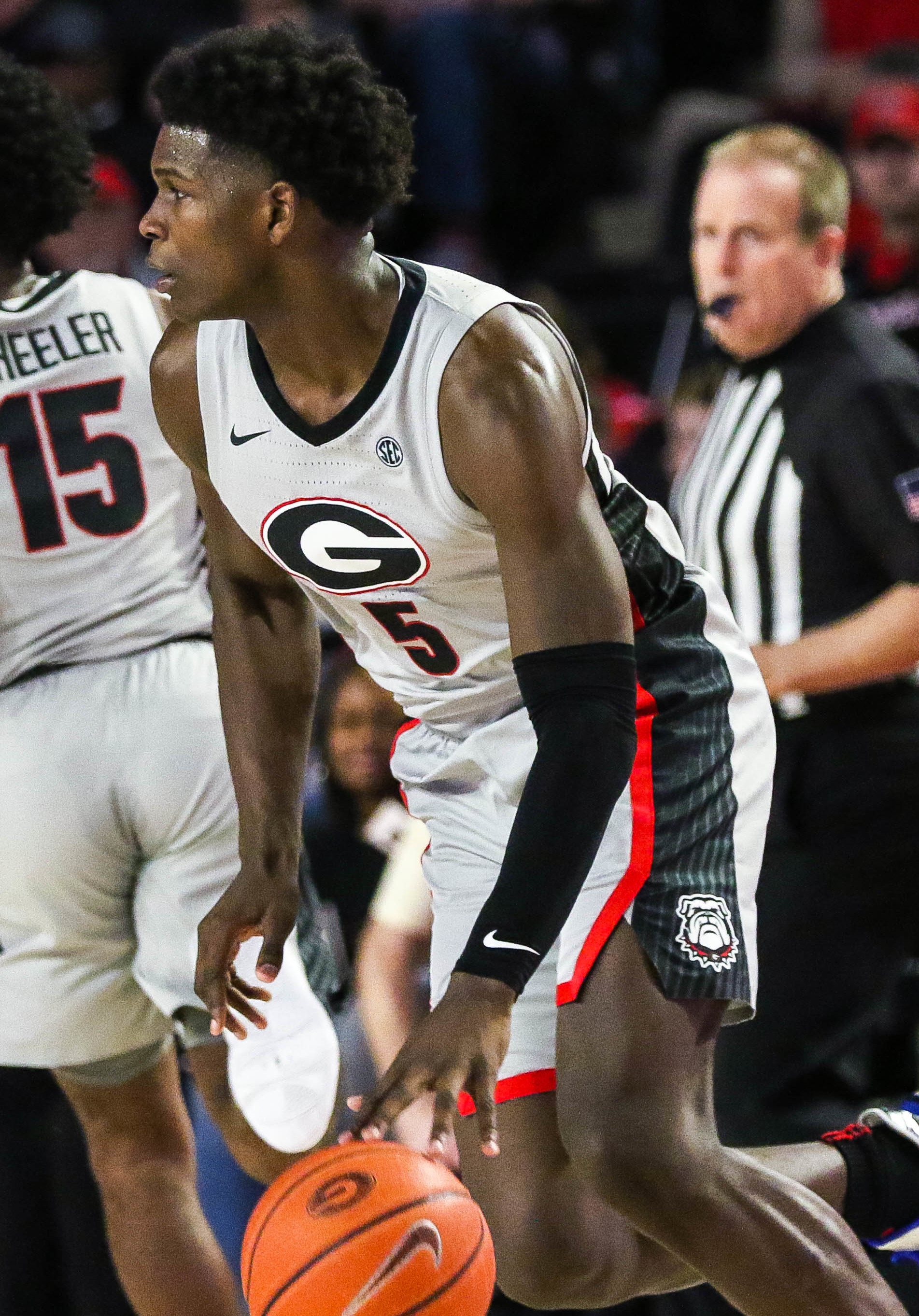
Edwards in 2020

On November 5, 2019, Edwards made his debut for the Georgia Bulldogs, recording 24 points, 9 rebounds, and 4 steals in a 91–72 win over Western Carolina. It was the most points by a Georgia freshman debutant since Basketball Hall of Fame inductee Dominique Wilkins in 1979. On November 26, he scored a season-high 37 points, including 33 in the second half, and posted six rebounds, four steals, and three blocks in a 93–85 loss to third-ranked Michigan State at the Maui Invitational. Edwards became the first Georgia freshman to score at least 37 points in a game since Jacky Dorsey in 1975. In his final game at the tournament, he led all scorers with 24 points and made the game-winning shot against NCAA Division II team Chaminade.

On February 1, 2020, Edwards recorded 29 points and 15 rebounds, both game-highs, in a 63–48 victory over Texas A&M. In his next game, he led all scorers with 32 points in an 81–75 loss to Florida. On February 26, Edwards scored 36 points and collected seven rebounds, four assists and four steals, in a 94–90 overtime defeat to South Carolina. As a freshman, he averaged 19.1 points, 5.2 rebounds and 2.8 assists per game. Edwards was the top scorer on his team and among freshmen nationally. He earned second-team All-SEC and SEC Freshman of the Year honors. Edwards collected SEC Freshman of the Week accolades four times during the season, the most in program history. He was also one of five finalists for the Jerry West Award, which recognizes the top collegiate shooting guard.

On March 20, 2020, in the spring of his freshman year, Edwards declared for the 2020 NBA draft as one of the most touted prospects in his class. He signed with an agent, forgoing his remaining college basketball eligibility.

== Professional career ==
=== Minnesota Timberwolves (2020–present) ===
==== 2020–21 season: All-Rookie honors ====
The 2020 NBA draft was delayed by five months due to the COVID-19 pandemic. In November 2020, the Minnesota Timberwolves selected Edwards as the No. 1 overall pick on draft night. On December 23, 2020, he made his NBA debut, putting up 15 points, 4 rebounds, and 4 assists in 25 minutes, in a 111–101 win against the Detroit Pistons. On March 18, 2021, Edwards scored a then career-high 42 points, along with 7 rebounds and 3 assists, in a game against the Phoenix Suns, becoming the third-youngest player to score 40+ points in NBA history. After the season, he finished second in Rookie of the Year voting and was named to the NBA All-Rookie First Team.

==== 2021–22 season: First playoff appearance ====
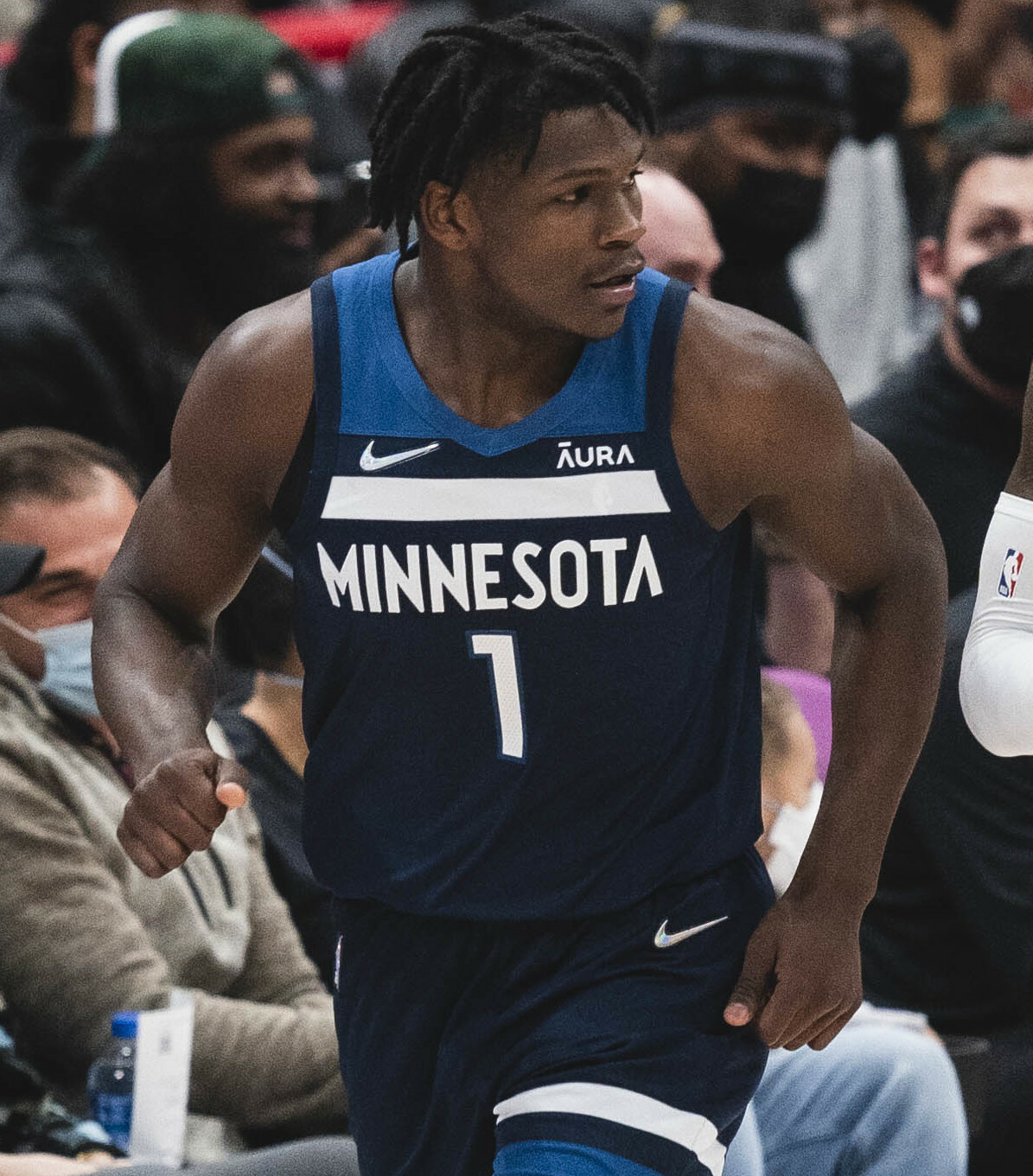
Edwards in 2021

On November 10, 2021, Edwards scored a then career-high 48 points on 7 three-pointers in a 123–110 loss to the Golden State Warriors. On December 15, Edwards had 38 points and a franchise record 10 three-pointers in a 124–107 win over the Denver Nuggets. He became the youngest NBA player ever with 10 three-pointers in a game, breaking the previous record set in 2015 by Kyrie Irving at age 22. Edwards also reached 2,000 career points in fewer games than any player in franchise history. On January 25, 2022, in a 109–107 win over the Portland Trail Blazers, he became the first player in NBA history to record a stat line of at least 40 points, 9 rebounds, 3 blocks, 3 steals, and 5 three-pointers in a single game; he joined Carmelo Anthony as the only players to score 40 points without an assist at 20 years old or younger. On April 7, 2022, Edwards scored a then career-high 49 points in a 127–121 win over the San Antonio Spurs.

In his playoff debut on April 16, 2022, he logged 36 points and 6 assists in a 130–117 Game 1 win over the Memphis Grizzlies in the opening round of the 2022 NBA playoffs. Minnesota lost to Memphis despite Edwards's 30-point, 5-rebound, 5-assist, 2-steal and 2-block outing in the 114–106 close-out loss in Game 6.

==== 2022–23 season: First All-Star appearance ====
On January 21, 2023, Edwards scored a season-high 44 points, including a season-high 8 three-pointers, along with 6 rebounds, 4 assists, 3 steals, and 3 blocks in a 113–104 win over the Houston Rockets. On February 10, 2023, he was named an All-Star for the first time in his career as a reserve. Edwards and De'Aaron Fox were announced as injury replacements for injured stars Stephen Curry and Zion Williamson. On April 9, in the final game of the 2022–23 season, Edwards recorded 26 points, 13 rebounds, 4 assists, 4 steals, and 4 blocks to help lead the Timberwolves to a 113–108 win over the New Orleans Pelicans, earning the eight seed in the Western Conference play-in tournament.

In Game 2 of the Timberwolves' first-round playoff series against the Denver Nuggets, Edwards put up 41 points in a 122–113 loss. His 41 points also set a Timberwolves franchise record for the most points scored in a playoff game, surpassing Sam Cassell's previous record of 40. On April 21, in Game 3 of the first round of the playoffs, Edwards scored 36 points in a 120–111 loss. He joined Kobe Bryant with the second-most 30-point NBA playoff games before turning 22 years old. In Game 4, Edwards had 34 points, 6 rebounds, 5 assists, 2 steals, and 3 blocks and scored a crucial 3-pointer to lead the Timberwolves to a 114–108 overtime win. In Game 5, the Timberwolves were eliminated from the playoffs by the eventual NBA champion Nuggets despite 29 points, 8 rebounds, 7 assists, and 2 blocks by Edwards. With the Nuggets leading 112–109 in the final seconds of the game, Edwards missed a game-tying three-pointer at the buzzer.

==== 2023–24 season: First All-NBA appearance ====
Edwards changed his jersey number from #1 to #5 before the 2023–24 season. On November 13, 2023, he was named the NBA Western Conference Player of the Week for the first time in his career after leading Minnesota to an undefeated week (4–0) with averages of 31.3 points, 6.3 rebounds, 6.8 assists and 2.0 steals. On January 27, 2024, Edwards recorded 32 points, 6 rebounds and a career-high 12 assists in a 113–112 loss against the San Antonio Spurs. On February 1, Edwards was named to his second All-Star Game as a Western Conference reserve. On April 9, Edwards put up a then career-high 51 points in a 130–121 win over the Washington Wizards. At the season's end, Edwards was named to the All-NBA Second Team for the first time in his career.

In Game 4 of the first round of the playoffs against Phoenix, Edwards scored 31 of his 40 points in the second half, along with nine rebounds and six assists in a 122–116 win to close out the series. It was the Timberwolves' first playoff series win in 20 years. He also surpassed Kevin Garnett for the most 30-point playoff games in Timberwolves franchise history, with eight. In Game 1 of the Western Conference Semifinals, Edwards scored a then playoff career-high and franchise postseason-record 43 points in a 106–99 victory over the Nuggets. He joined Kobe Bryant as the only players with consecutive 40-point games at age 22 or younger in NBA postseason history. In Game 4 of the Western Conference Semifinals, Edwards scored a playoff career-high and franchise postseason-record 44 points, along with five rebounds and five assists, in a 115–107 loss to the Nuggets. In Game 4 of the Western Conference Finals, Edwards posted a near triple-double with 29 points, 10 rebounds and 9 assists in a 105–100 victory over the Dallas Mavericks. Minnesota would go on to lose to Dallas in five games despite Edwards 28-point, 9-rebound and 6-assist outing in a 124–103 close-out loss in Game 5.

==== 2024–25 season: Three-point scoring leader ====
On January 4, 2025, Edwards scored a then career-high 53 points and tied his career-high with 10 three-pointers in a 119–105 loss to the Detroit Pistons. On January 25, Edwards surpassed Karl-Anthony Towns for the most career three-pointers in Timberwolves franchise history with 976, in a 133–104 win over the Denver Nuggets. On January 30, Edwards was named to his third All-Star Game in a row as a Western Conference reserve. On February 5, Edwards recorded 49 points (20 in the third quarter) and 9 rebounds in a 127–109 win over the Chicago Bulls. He tied Kevin Garnett for the second-most 30-point games and tied Karl-Anthony Towns for the most 40-point games in team history. The next day, Edwards had 41 points, seven rebounds and six assists in a 127–114 win over the Houston Rockets. It was Edwards’ 14th career 40-point game, passing Towns (13) for the most in franchise history. He became just the third player in Minnesota history to tally back-to-back 40-point games, joining Andrew Wiggins (2017) and Kevin Love (2014). He also broke the record for the youngest player in NBA history to reach 1,000 career three-point baskets (23y, 185d). On February 10, Edwards put up 44 points in a 128–107 loss to the Cleveland Cavaliers. He became the first player in Timberwolves franchise history to achieve at least three consecutive 40-point games. On April 10, Edwards scored 44 points, including 18 during Minnesota's franchise-record, 52-point third quarter, and the Timberwolves beat the Memphis Grizzlies 141–125. At the end of the season, Edwards became the three-point scoring leader (320 3-pointers made). It was the first time in Edwards’ career that he reached 300 made 3s. It’s also the seventh-highest total in NBA history. He also finished third in the NBA Clutch Player of the Year voting.

On April 27, in Game 4 of the first round of the playoffs, Edwards scored 43 points to go along with nine rebounds and six assists in a 116–113 win over the Los Angeles Lakers. On May 6, in Game 1 of the second round, Edwards recorded 23 points and a playoff career-high 14 rebounds in a 99–88 loss against the Golden State Warriors. On May 14, in Game 5, Edwards had 22 points, 7 rebounds, and a playoff career-high 12 assists in a 121–110 closeout victory over the Warriors, guiding the Timberwolves to their second consecutive Western Conference Finals. On May 24, In Game 3 of the Western Conference Finals, Edwards tallied 30 points, nine rebounds and six assists in just three quarters, leading the Timberwolves to a 143–101 blowout win over the Oklahoma City Thunder. The victory cut the Thunder’s series lead to 2–1 and marked the Timberwolves’ highest-scoring playoff game in franchise history. Minnesota went on to lose to Oklahoma City in five games.

==== 2025–26 season: All-Star Game MVP ====
On November 30, 2025, Edwards scored 32 points in a 125–112 win over the San Antonio Spurs, marking his 102nd career 30-point game and setting a new Timberwolves franchise record. On December 2, Edwards scored a season-high 44 points to lead the Timberwolves to a 149–142 overtime victory over the New Orleans Pelicans. He poured in 34 of those 44 points in the second half, including a driving layup with 2.3 seconds remaining in regulation that forced overtime.

On January 8, 2026, Edwards recorded 25 points, seven rebounds, and nine assists in a 131–122 win over the Cleveland Cavaliers. With the performance, he became the seventh player in NBA history to reach 10,000 career points before turning 25, joining Kobe Bryant, Tracy McGrady, LeBron James, Carmelo Anthony, Kevin Durant, and Luka Dončić. Edwards also became the third-youngest player in NBA history to reach 10,000 career points, trailing only LeBron James and Kevin Durant. On January 17, Edwards scored a career-high 55 points, including 26 in the fourth quarter, in a 126–123 loss to the San Antonio Spurs. On February 1, Edwards was named to his fourth All-Star Game in a row as a Western Conference reserve. He was named the NBA All-Star Game MVP after recording a total of 32 points and 9 rebounds in 26 minutes across 3 games for the USA Stars. On February 3, Edwards posted 41 points, six rebounds, six assists and five steals, while knocking down seven three-pointers, leading the Timberwolves to a 117–110 win over the Memphis Grizzlies. In doing so, he became the first player in franchise history to record at least 40 points, five steals and five made three-pointers in a single game.

On May 10, in Game 4 of the Western Conference Semifinals, Edwards scored 36 points in a 114–109 victory over the San Antonio Spurs to tie the series at 2–2. In the process, Edwards recorded his 18th career playoff game with 30 or more points before turning 25, tying Dwyane Wade for the fourth-most in NBA history. Ahead of him are LeBron James (30), Kobe Bryant (26), and Kevin Durant (22). Minnesota went on to lose to San Antonio in six games.

==== 2026–27 season ====
On October 21, 2026, Edwards opened the season with 45 points, 10 rebounds and nine three-pointers in a 131–106 victory over the Miami Heat, setting a franchise record for points in a season opener. He also became the third player in NBA history, alongside Wilt Chamberlain and Michael Jordan, to score at least 40 points in multiple season openers. On October 26, he scored 47 points in a 127–125 overtime loss to the Cleveland Cavaliers, bringing his total to a franchise-record 133 points through the first four games of the season. On October 29, Edwards underwent arthroscopic surgery on his right knee and was expected to miss up to two months.

== National team career ==
Edwards was a member of the United States national team that competed in the 2023 FIBA Basketball World Cup. He started all eight games and was selected in the All-FIBA World Cup Team. He was the leading scorer for the U.S., averaging 18.9 points per game. The team finished in fourth place. He was named to the 2024 Olympic team. He helped Team USA win the gold medal, and in six games, he averaged 12.8 points, 2.8 rebounds, 1.2 assists and 1.3 steals per game while shooting 58% from the field.

== Player profile ==
Edwards plays primarily as a shooting guard. He is listed at 6 feet 4 inches (1.93 m) and weighs 225lb (102 kilograms). He’s known for his explosive athleticism, often going viral for his thunderous poster dunks, including one over John Collins that the NBA named the 2023–24 Dunk of the Year. The Ringer called him "a preposterous athlete with a nice jumper and better instincts". He’s drawn comparisons to a young Michael Jordan for his ability to finish around the rim. “They have a lot of the same mannerisms. The moves, the fadeaway, the athleticism, the poster dunks… that same kind of work ethic, that same kind of ‘I don’t sleep at all at night because I’m ready to play, I’m ready to hoop,” according to teammate Mike Conley.

Despite pre-draft concerns that he was a limited long-range scorer, Edwards has developed an efficient, high-volume three-point shot — shooting 37% on eight attempts per game. He led the NBA in three-pointers made for the 2024–25 season. The same year, he became the youngest player in NBA history to make 1,000 threes.

His stout frame, lateral speed and competitiveness have helped transform his reputation on the defensive end — Team USA coach Steve Kerr called his on-ball defense “amazing” during the FIBA World Cup. His ability to match up against both long wings and shifty guards has garnered praise from Timberwolves head coach Chris Finch. Edwards himself believes his defense is “overlooked” by the national media. In 2024, he won the NBA Fan Favorite award for Block of Year after leaping to prevent a game-winning shot by the Pacers' Aaron Nesmith.

== Awards and honors ==
NBA

- 4× NBA All-Star: 2023–2026
- NBA All-Star Game MVP: 2026
- 2× All-NBA Second Team: 2024, 2025
- NBA All-Rookie First Team: 2021
- NBA three-point scoring leader: 2025

USA Basketball

- Olympics gold medalist: 2024
- FIBA Basketball World Cup All-Tournament Team: 2023

== Career statistics ==
Legend
GP	Games played	GS	Games started	MPG	Minutes per game
FG%	Field goal percentage	3P%	3-point field goal percentage	FT%	Free throw percentage
RPG	Rebounds per game	APG	Assists per game	SPG	Steals per game
BPG	Blocks per game	PPG	Points per game	**Bold**	Career high
*	Led the league

=== NBA ===
==== Regular season ====
Year	Team	GP	GS	MPG	FG%	3P%	FT%	RPG	APG	SPG	BPG	PPG
2020–21	Minnesota	72*	55	32.1	.417	.329	.776	4.7	2.9	1.1	.5	19.3
2021–22	Minnesota	72	72	34.3	.441	.357	.786	4.8	3.8	1.5	.6	21.3
2022–23	Minnesota	**79**	**79**	36.0	.459	.369	.756	**5.8**	4.4	**1.6**	.7	24.6
2023–24	Minnesota	**79**	78	35.1	.461	.357	.836	5.4	**5.1**	1.3	.5	25.9
2024–25	Minnesota	**79**	**79**	**36.3**	.447	.395	**.837**	5.7	4.5	1.2	.6	27.6
2025–26	Minnesota	61	60	35.0	**.489**	**.399**	.796	5.0	3.7	1.4	**.8**	**28.8**
Career		442	423	34.8	.453	.369	.802	5.2	4.1	1.3	.6	24.6
All-Star		3	0	18.5	.636	.333	—	4.7	1.7	.3	.0	16.0

==== Playoffs ====
Year	Team	GP	GS	MPG	FG%	3P%	FT%	RPG	APG	SPG	BPG	PPG
2022	Minnesota	6	6	37.8	.455	**.404**	.824	4.2	3.0	1.2	1.2	25.2
2023	Minnesota	5	5	39.7	**.482**	.349	**.846**	5.0	5.2	**1.8**	**2.0**	**31.6**
2024	Minnesota	**16**	**16**	**40.5**	.481	.400	.814	7.0	**6.5**	1.5	.6	27.6
2025	Minnesota	15	15	39.0	.453	.354	.719	**7.8**	5.5	1.1	.7	25.3
2026	Minnesota	10	8	32.4	.428	.317	.824	5.7	2.7	.5	.7	21.6
Career		52	50	38.2	.461	.368	.794	6.5	4.9	1.2	.8	25.9

=== College ===
Year	Team	GP	GS	MPG	FG%	3P%	FT%	RPG	APG	SPG	BPG	PPG
2019–20	Georgia	32	32	33.0	.402	.294	.772	5.2	2.8	1.3	.6	19.1

== Other ventures ==
Edwards made his acting debut in the 2022 sports drama film Hustle. In 2023, Adidas released the AE1, his first signature shoe. It quickly became a best-seller, prompting the company to sign him to a multiyear extension worth "around $50 million".

== Personal life ==
=== Children and marriage ===
Edwards has four children with four different women. His daughter with Shannon Jackson, Aislynn, was born in March 2024. Edwards and Jackson married on July 16, 2026.

=== Criticisms ===
In September 2022, Edwards posted a video to his Instagram story referring to a group of shirtless men standing on a sidewalk with a homophobic slur. The NBA fined him $40,000 for using "offensive and derogatory language."

In December 2023, Paige Jordae, an Instagram model, accused Edwards of impregnating her and then offering her $100,000 to get an abortion. Jordae posted screenshots of text messages with Edwards. The screenshots, which were initially posted to Jordae's Instagram story, also included a screenshot of a pending wire transfer of $100,000 on November 27, 2023. Edwards responded, "I am handling my personal matters privately and will not be commenting on them any further at this time."

== See also ==
- List of NBA single-season 3-point scoring leaders
