= Paolo Banchero =

Italian and American basketball player (born 2002)

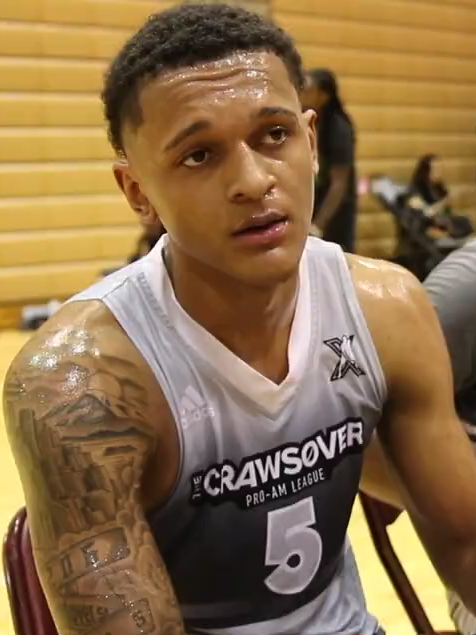
- Banchero in 2021

No. 5 – Orlando Magic
- Position: Power forward
- League: NBA

Personal information
- Born: November 12, 2002 (age 24) Seattle, Washington, U.S.
- Listed height: 6 ft 10 in (2.08 m)
- Listed weight: 250 lb (113 kg)

Career information
- High school: O'Dea (Seattle, Washington)
- College: Duke (2021–2022)
- NBA draft: 2022: 1st round, 1st overall pick
- Drafted by: Orlando Magic
- Playing career: 2022–present

Career history
- 2022–present: Orlando Magic

Career highlights
- NBA All-Star (2024); NBA Rookie of the Year (2023); NBA All-Rookie First Team (2023); Consensus second-team All-American (2022); First-team All-ACC (2022); ACC Rookie of the Year (2022); ACC All-Freshman Team (2022); McDonald's All-American (2021)
- Stats at NBA.com
- Stats at Basketball Reference

Paolo Napoleon James Banchero (/ˈpaʊloʊ bæŋˈkɛəroʊ/ POW-loh bang-KAIR-oh, Italian: [ˈpaːolo baŋˈkɛːro]; born November 12, 2002) is an American and Italian professional basketball player for the Orlando Magic of the National Basketball Association (NBA). He played college basketball for the Duke Blue Devils. Banchero was named the Rookie of the Year of the Atlantic Coast Conference (ACC) in 2022. Following his freshman season, he declared for the 2022 NBA draft, where he was selected with the first overall pick by the Orlando Magic. Banchero was named the NBA Rookie of the Year in 2023.

== Early life ==
Banchero was born in Seattle, Washington. He grew up in the South Seattle neighborhood of Mount Baker.

Banchero's mother, Rhonda Banchero (née Smith), played college basketball for Washington Huskies women's basketball, leaving as the program's all-time scoring leader. She was a third-round selection in the 2000 WNBA draft and played professionally in the American Basketball League and overseas. Rhonda subsequently became a basketball coach at Holy Names Academy in Seattle and taught young Paolo the game. Banchero's father, Mario, and his uncle played college football for Washington. His parents met while attending the University of Washington. He has a younger brother, Giulio, and a younger sister, Mia.

Banchero is Black descent on his mother's side and Italian descent on his father's side. Paolo reached a height of 3 feet (0.9 m) at 15 months of age.

In his childhood, he played basketball and American football and took part in track. He grew up playing basketball at Rotary Boys and Girls Club of Seattle, as well as EBC Camps most notably the "Ballislife Jr. All-American Camp", drawing inspiration from his mother, who played professionally. In seventh grade, Banchero grew from 6 ft 1 in (1.85 m) to 6 ft 5 in (1.96 m). He was ranked among the top 50 eighth-graders nationally in both basketball and football.

Banchero's mother helped him file a lawsuit in 2019 against the King County Sheriff’s Office after an officer pointed a gun at a friend of his during a traffic stop after a concert in 2018. Banchero was in the passenger seat of the vehicle during the interaction. The sheriff's office apologized to the two African American high-school students and implemented new use-of-force guidelines to be used when its officers approach motorists. Banchero received $20,000 from the lawsuit.

== High school career ==
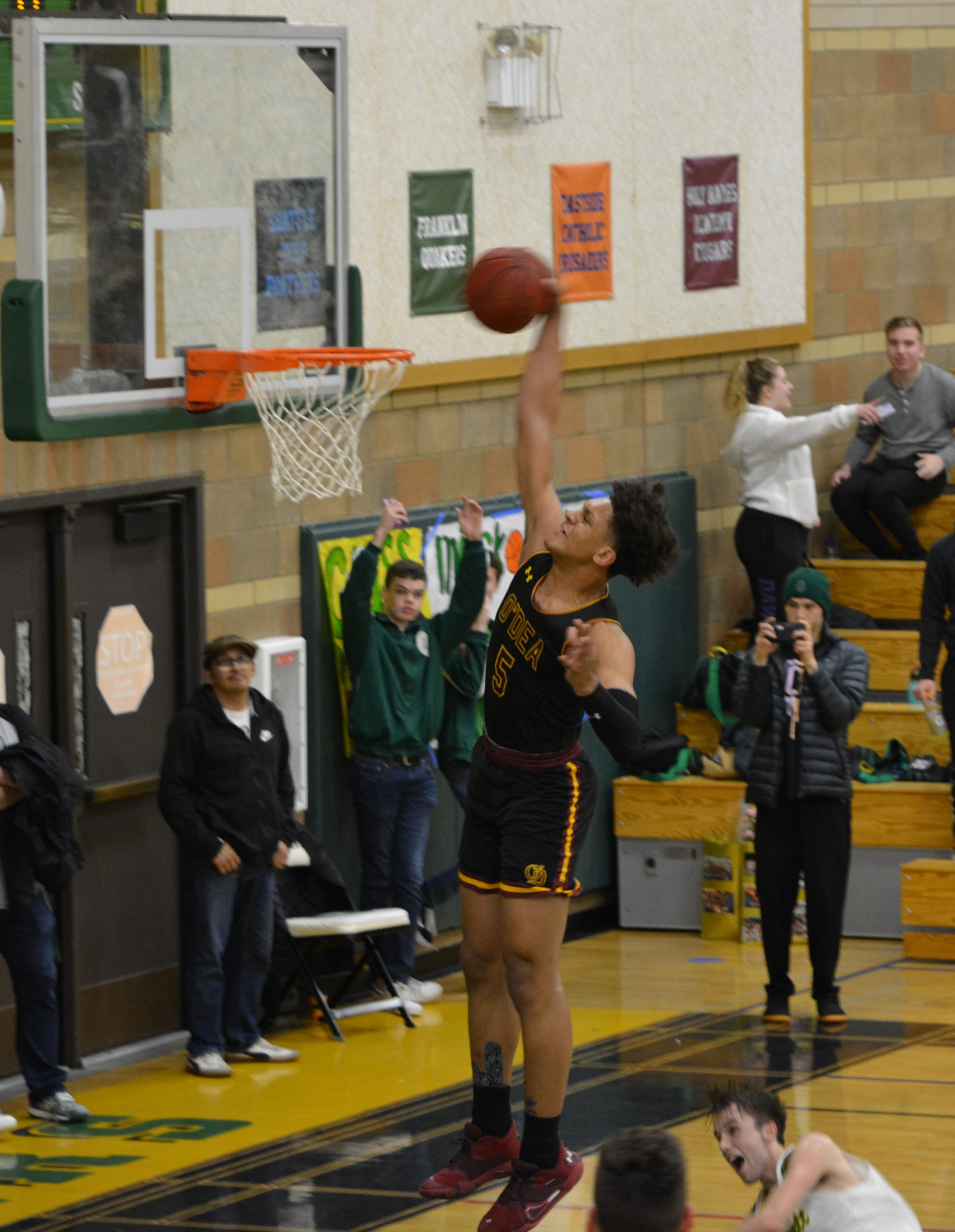
Banchero playing for O'Dea High School in 2020

In his first year at O'Dea High School in Seattle, Banchero played football, as the backup quarterback on the state championship team, as well as basketball. As a freshman on the basketball team, he averaged 14.1 points and 10.2 rebounds per game. In his sophomore season, Banchero averaged 18.2 points, 10.3 rebounds and 4.3 assists per game, leading O'Dea to the Class 3A state championship, where he was named most valuable player. As a junior, he averaged 22.6 points, 11 rebounds, 3.7 assists and 1.6 blocks per game for the Class 3A runners-up, earning Washington Gatorade Player of the Year and MaxPreps National Junior of the Year honors. Banchero was named to the McDonald's All-American Game and Jordan Brand Classic rosters.

=== Recruiting ===
Banchero was a consensus five-star recruit and one of the top players in the 2021 class. Although he received offers from top NCAA Division I programs, including Duke and Kentucky, most recruiting analysts predicted that he would commit to Washington. Despite the predictions, on August 20, 2020, Banchero committed to playing college basketball for Duke.

College recruiting
| Name | Hometown | School | Height | Weight | Commit date |
|---|---|---|---|---|---|
| Paolo Banchero; PF | Seattle, WA | O'Dea (WA) | 6 ft 9 in (2.06 m) | 235 lb (107 kg) | Aug 20, 2020 |
| Paolo Banchero; PF | Recruit ratings: Rivals: 247Sports: ESPN: (97) | | | | |
Overall recruit ranking: Rivals: 2 247Sports: 2 ESPN: 3
Note: In many cases, Scout, Rivals, 247Sports, On3, and ESPN may conflict in their listings of height and weight.; In these cases, the average was taken. ESPN grades are on a 100-point scale.; Sources: "Duke 2021 Basketball Commitments". Rivals.; "2021 Duke Blue Devils Recruiting Class". ESPN.; "2021 Team Ranking". Rivals.

== College career ==
In his college debut, a 79–71 win against Kentucky, Banchero scored 22 points. On November 15, Banchero earned his first Atlantic Coast Conference (ACC) Freshman of the Week honor. On November 23, 2021, Banchero registered 28 points and 8 rebounds in a 107–81 victory against The Citadel. On November 27, 2021, Banchero scored 21 points and grabbed 5 rebounds in a 84–81 win against Gonzaga. On November 29, 2021, Banchero was named ACC freshman of the week for the second time. On December 23, 2021, Banchero put up 23 points in a 76–65 victory over Virginia Tech. On January 12, 2022, Banchero registered 24 points and 5 rebounds in a 76–64 victory against Wake Forest. On January 15, 2022, Banchero tallied 21 points and 8 rebounds in a 88–73 win over NC State. On January 17, 2022, Banchero earned ACC freshman of the week honors. On February 12, 2022, Banchero scored 16 points and snagged 14 rebounds in a 72–61 win against Boston College. He was named first-team All-ACC as well as ACC Rookie of the Year. On March 15, 2022, Banchero was named a third-team All-American. During the 2022 NCAA tournament, Banchero performed well, including scoring 22 points against Texas Tech. As a freshman, he averaged 17.2 points, 7.8 rebounds and 3.2 assists per game. On April 20, 2022, Banchero declared for the 2022 NBA draft, forgoing his remaining college eligibility.

== Professional career ==
=== Orlando Magic (2022–present) ===
==== 2022–2023: Rookie of the Year ====
Banchero was selected with the first overall pick by the Orlando Magic in the 2022 NBA draft. During the draft at that time, it was a surprising selection as the Magic were reported to be taking Jabari Smith Jr. with their pick. He made his 2022 NBA Summer League debut on July 7 against the Houston Rockets with 17 points, four rebounds and six assists in a 91–77 win. On October 3, 2022, Banchero made his preseason debut, putting up eight points, two rebounds and one assist in a 109–97 loss to the Memphis Grizzlies. On October 19, Banchero made his regular-season debut, putting up 27 points, nine rebounds, five assists and two blocks in a 113–109 loss to the Detroit Pistons. Banchero also became the first player since LeBron James to put up at least 25 points, five rebounds and five assists in an NBA debut. On November 5, Banchero put up 33 points and 16 rebounds in a 126–123 loss to the Sacramento Kings. He also became the second teenager in NBA history to put up at least 30 points and 15 rebounds in a game, joining LeBron James. Banchero, tied Grant Hill, Dominique Wilkins and Oscar Robertson for third on the all-time list of consecutive 20+-point games to start an NBA career at 6 (behind Elvin Hayes' 10 and Wilt Chamberlain, 56). At the season's end, Banchero was named the NBA Rookie of the Year and earned NBA All-Rookie Team honors.

==== 2023–2024: First All-Star Game and playoff appearances ====
On November 2, 2023, Banchero put up 30 points alongside a game-winning layup in a 115–113 win over the Utah Jazz. On November 4, Banchero recorded a 25-point and 10-assist double-double while adding seven rebounds and leading the Magic to a 120–101 win over the Los Angeles Lakers. On November 15, Banchero posted 17 points, nine rebounds, and made a game-winner in a 96–94 win over the Chicago Bulls. On December 6, Banchero put up a then career-high 42 points in a 121–111 loss to the Cleveland Cavaliers. On January 3, 2024, Banchero scored a then career-high 43 points in a 138–135 double-overtime loss against the Sacramento Kings. On January 6, Banchero recorded his first career triple-double with 30 points, 10 rebounds, 11 assists and 3 steals in a 122–120 win over the Denver Nuggets. On February 1, 2024, Banchero was named to his first career All-Star Game as an Eastern Conference reserve. On February 24, Banchero put up 15 points alongside a game-winning jumpshot in a 112–109 win over the Detroit Pistons. On March 21, Banchero recorded his second career triple-double with 20 points, 10 rebounds and 11 assists in a 121–106 victory over New Orleans Pelicans.

On April 20, Banchero played in his first career postseason game, recording 24 points, 7 rebounds and 5 assists, however committing nine turnovers in a 97–83 loss in Game 1 of the First Round to the Cleveland Cavaliers. Trailing 2–0 heading into Game 3, Banchero led Orlando to a 121–83 dominant victory over Cleveland behind his 31-point, 14-rebound performance. In Game 5, Banchero scored a playoff career-high 39 points, along with eight rebounds and four assists in a 104–103 narrow loss to the Cavaliers. Orlando would go on to lose to Cleveland in seven games despite Banchero's 38-point and playoff career-high 16-rebound outing in the 106–94 close-out loss in Game 7.

==== 2024–2025: Injury and return ====
On October 23, 2024, in the Magic's season-opening game, Banchero put up 33 points and 11 rebounds in a 116–97 win over the Miami Heat. He joined Shaquille O'Neal and Tracy McGrady as the only players in Magic franchise history to put up at least 30 points and 10 rebounds in a season-opening game. On October 28, Banchero put up a career-high 50 points, along with 13 rebounds, nine assists and two blocks in a 119–115 win over the Indiana Pacers. Banchero's 50-point performance made him the fourth player in Orlando Magic history to score at least 50 points in a single game.

On October 30, while playing against the Chicago Bulls, Banchero suffered a torn oblique on his right side. Banchero later stated that he played through the pain, only receiving medical attention after Orlando's loss. On November 1, hours before a game against the Cleveland Cavaliers, Banchero's diagnosis was made public. He was expected to be re-examined four to six weeks following the initial diagnosis, and to sit out indefinitely. Banchero returned on January 10, 2025, posting 34 points and seven rebounds in a 109–106 loss against the Milwaukee Bucks. On February 20, Banchero put up 36 points, 10 rebounds, and five assists in a 114–108 win over the Atlanta Hawks. He joined O'Neal and McGrady as the only players in Magic franchise history to put up multiple games with at least 35 points, 10 rebounds, and five assists.

==== 2025–2026: Contract extension ====
On July 7, 2025, Banchero signed a five-year, $239 million contract extension with the Magic.

On December 18, Banchero recorded his third career triple-double with 26 points, 16 rebounds, and 10 assists in a 126–115 loss to the Denver Nuggets. On December 29, Banchero posted his fourth career triple-double with 23 points, 15 rebounds and 10 assists in a tight 107–106 loss to the Toronto Raptors.

On April 29, 2026, in Game 5 of the first-round playoff series, Banchero recorded a career-high 45 points, along with 9 rebounds and 7 assists, but the Magic fell 116–109 to the Detroit Pistons. In Game 7, despite Banchero posting 38 points, nine rebounds, and six assists, the Magic were eliminated from the playoffs with a 116–94 loss to the Pistons.

== National team career ==
Banchero was eligible to play for the Italy national team and indicated his willingness to represent Italy in international competitions. He was selected to their 24-man squad for the EuroBasket 2022 qualification games in November 2020; however, he did not play. In June 2023, Banchero opted to play for the 2023 U.S. national team at the FIBA Basketball World Cup. He said that his mother had played for Team USA, so it was always his dream. Gianni Petrucci, president of the Italian Basketball Federation, described Banchero's decision as "betrayal."

== Business endeavors ==
In November 2025, Banchero joined the ownership group of the Seattle Seawolves. He also has stakes in AC Milan.

== Career statistics ==
Legend
| GP | Games played | GS | Games started | MPG | Minutes per game |
| FG% | Field goal percentage | 3P% | 3-point field goal percentage | FT% | Free throw percentage |
| RPG | Rebounds per game | APG | Assists per game | SPG | Steals per game |
| BPG | Blocks per game | PPG | Points per game | **Bold** | Career high |

=== NBA ===
==== Regular season ====
| Year | Team | GP | GS | MPG | FG% | 3P% | FT% | RPG | APG | SPG | BPG | PPG |
|---|---|---|---|---|---|---|---|---|---|---|---|---|
| 2022–23 | Orlando | 72 | 72 | 33.7 | .427 | .298 | .738 | 6.9 | 3.7 | .8 | .5 | 20.0 |
| 2023–24 | Orlando | **80** | **80** | **35.0** | .455 | **.339** | .725 | 6.9 | **5.4** | **.9** | **.6** | 22.6 |
| 2024–25 | Orlando | 46 | 46 | 34.4 | .452 | .320 | .727 | 7.5 | 4.8 | .8 | **.6** | **25.9** |
| 2025–26 | Orlando | 72 | 72 | 34.8 | **.459** | .305 | **.775** | **8.4** | 5.2 | .7 | **.6** | 22.2 |
| Career | | 270 | 270 | 34.5 | .449 | .317 | .743 | 7.4 | 4.8 | .8 | .6 | 22.3 |
| All-Star | | 1 | 0 | 18.9 | .333 | .000 | — | 9.0 | 5.0 | .0 | .0 | 6.0 |

==== Playoffs ====
| Year | Team | GP | GS | MPG | FG% | 3P% | FT% | RPG | APG | SPG | BPG | PPG |
|---|---|---|---|---|---|---|---|---|---|---|---|---|
| 2024 | Orlando | **7** | **7** | 37.5 | **.456** | .400 | **.755** | 8.6 | 4.0 | 1.1 | .6 | 27.0 |
| 2025 | Orlando | 5 | 5 | **39.4** | .435 | **.444** | .659 | 8.4 | 4.2 | .6 | **.8** | **29.4** |
| 2026 | Orlando | **7** | **7** | 39.0 | .420 | .333 | .676 | **9.0** | **6.3** | **1.4** | .7 | 26.3 |
| Career | | 19 | 19 | 38.5 | .438 | .385 | .695 | 8.7 | 4.9 | 1.1 | .7 | 27.4 |

=== College ===
| Year | Team | GP | GS | MPG | FG% | 3P% | FT% | RPG | APG | SPG | BPG | PPG |
|---|---|---|---|---|---|---|---|---|---|---|---|---|
| 2021–22 | Duke | 39 | 39 | 33.0 | .478 | .338 | .729 | 7.8 | 3.2 | 1.1 | .9 | 17.2 |

== Personal life ==
In February 2020, Banchero received Italian citizenship because of his paternal ancestry.

On the morning of November 14, 2021, Banchero was charged with aiding and abetting DUI after Duke teammate Michael Savarino, grandson of coach Mike Krzyzewski, was arrested on DUI charges. On July 29, 2022, the charges against Banchero were dropped after Savarino pled guilty to DUI.

On May 8, 2022, Banchero attended the inaugural Miami Grand Prix in Miami Gardens. There, he was interviewed by Sky Sports announcer Martin Brundle, who mistakenly believed that he was Patrick Mahomes.

Banchero's paternal cousin, Chris Banchero, is a professional basketball player for the Meralco Bolts of the Philippine Basketball Association.

Banchero's younger brother, Giulio, has signed to play college football at Eastern Washington starting in 2026.
