= Walker Kessler =

American basketball player (born 2001)

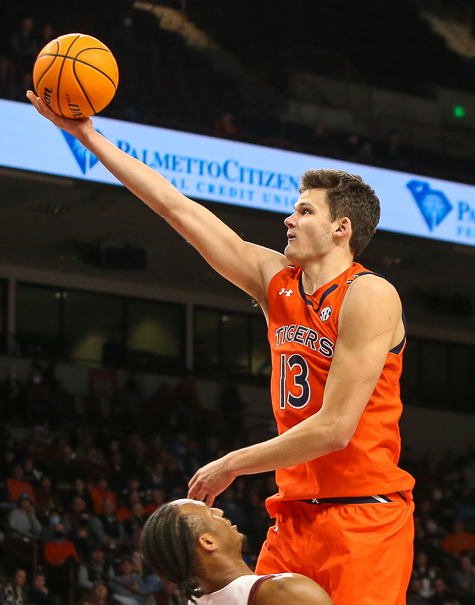
- Kessler with Auburn in 2022

No. 14 – Los Angeles Lakers
- Position: Center
- League: NBA

Personal information
- Born: July 26, 2001 (age 25) Atlanta, Georgia, U.S.
- Listed height: 7 ft 1 in (2.16 m)
- Listed weight: 245 lb (111 kg)

Career information
- High school: Woodward Academy (College Park, Georgia)
- College: North Carolina (2020–2021); Auburn (2021–2022)
- NBA draft: 2022: 1st round, 22nd overall pick
- Drafted by: Memphis Grizzlies
- Playing career: 2022–present

Career history
- 2022–2026: Utah Jazz
- 2026–present: Los Angeles Lakers

Career highlights
- NBA All-Rookie First Team (2023); Naismith Defensive Player of the Year (2022); NABC Defensive Player of the Year (2022); Third-team All-American – AP, USBWA (2022); First-team All-SEC (2022); SEC Defensive Player of the Year (2022); SEC All-Defensive Team (2022); McDonald's All-American (2020); Mr. Georgia Basketball (2020)
- Stats at NBA.com
- Stats at Basketball Reference

Walker Ross Kessler (born July 26, 2001) is an American professional basketball player for the Los Angeles Lakers of the National Basketball Association (NBA). He played college basketball for the North Carolina Tar Heels and Auburn Tigers.

== Early life ==
Kessler played basketball for Woodward Academy in College Park, Georgia. In his senior season, he averaged 17.8 points, 9.3 rebounds and 5.2 blocks per game, leading his team to its first Class 4A state title. During his time at Woodward, he played on the varsity basketball team with Golden State Warriors guard, Will Richard, who was also on the 2020 state championship team. Kessler was named The Atlanta Journal-Constitution Player of the Year, Mr. Georgia Basketball and Georgia Gatorade Player of the Year. He was a McDonald's All-American selection. Kessler competed for Game Elite on the Amateur Athletic Union circuit. His jersey hangs outside of the varsity gym at Woodward Academy.

A consensus five-star recruit and one of the top centers in the 2020 class, he committed to playing college basketball for North Carolina over offers from Duke, Michigan, Virginia and Vanderbilt, among others.

College recruiting
Name	Hometown	School	Height	Weight	Commit date
Walker Kessler; C	Newnan, GA	Woodward Academy (GA)	7 ft 0 in (2.13 m)	245 lb (111 kg)	Sep 22, 2019
Walker Kessler; C	Recruit ratings: Rivals: 247Sports: ESPN: (94)				
Overall recruit ranking: Rivals: 24 247Sports: 28 ESPN: 14
Note: In many cases, Scout, Rivals, 247Sports, On3, and ESPN may conflict in their listings of height and weight.; In these cases, the average was taken. ESPN grades are on a 100-point scale.; Sources: "North Carolina 2020 Basketball Commitments". Rivals.; "2020 North Carolina Tar Heels Recruiting Class". ESPN.; "2020 Team Ranking". Rivals.

== College career ==
=== North Carolina (2020–2021) ===
On March 10, 2021, Kessler posted 16 points, 12 rebounds and eight blocks in a 101–59 win over Notre Dame in the second round of the ACC tournament. He set a North Carolina freshman record and an ACC Tournament record for blocks in a game. As a freshman, he averaged 4.4 points and 3.2 rebounds per game.

=== Auburn (2021–2022) ===
Following the season, Kessler transferred to Auburn, choosing the Tigers over Gonzaga. On December 29, 2021, he posted a triple-double of 16 points, a career-high 11 blocks and 10 rebounds against LSU. On January 25, Kessler received SEC Player of the Week honors following strong performances against Georgia and Kentucky. Kessler was regarded as one of the nations premier shot blockers, setting the Auburn single season block record, leading the nation in blocks and recording more blocks than all but 13 teams. At the conclusion of the regular season, Kessler was named the SEC Defensive Player of the Year, a member of the All-SEC First Team and a 3rd Team All American. On April 3, 2022, Kessler declared for the 2022 NBA draft, forgoing his remaining college eligibility.

== Professional career ==
=== Utah Jazz (2022–2026) ===
Kessler was selected by the Memphis Grizzlies with the 22nd overall pick before being traded to the Minnesota Timberwolves, alongside TyTy Washington, for Jake LaRavia. On July 6, 2022, two weeks after being drafted, Kessler was traded along with Patrick Beverley, Jarred Vanderbilt, Leandro Bolmaro, Malik Beasley, four future first-round picks, and a pick swap to the Utah Jazz in exchange for Rudy Gobert. On July 9, Kessler signed his rookie scale contract with the Jazz.

On January 16, 2023, Kessler put up a double-double with a career-high 20 points and a then career-high 21 rebounds, alongside four assists and two blocks in a 126–125 win over the Minnesota Timberwolves. On March 25, 2023, Kessler scored a career-high 31 points to go along with 11 rebounds in a 121–113 loss to the Sacramento Kings. Over the course of his rookie season he appeared in 74 games while averaging 9.2 points per game.

At the conclusion of the 2022–23 season, Kessler was announced as a finalist for the NBA Rookie of the Year Award, ultimately finishing third in the voting.

Kessler made five starts for Utah during the 2025–26 NBA season, averaging 14.4 points, 10.8 rebounds, and 3.0 assists. On November 5, 2025, it was announced that Kessler would require season-ending left shoulder surgery to repair a torn labrum. During his third year in Utah, and already an undisputed starter, on March 7, 2025, he achieved a career-high 25 rebounds against the Toronto Raptors, in addition to 18 points and a career-high eight blocks.

=== Los Angeles Lakers (2026–present) ===
On July 8, 2026, Kessler signed a 4-year, $130 million contract with the Los Angeles Lakers via a sign-and-trade with the Jazz in exchange for two first-round picks and two first-round pick swaps.

On October 21, Kessler made his Lakers debut, putting up 26 points on 12-of-12 shooting from the field, along with nine rebounds and two blocks in a 127–105 win over the Golden State Warriors. His 12 shots without a miss were the second-most in Lakers history, trailing only a 14-for-14 performance by Wilt Chamberlain in 1969. Kessler also became the first Laker since Shaquille O'Neal in 2003 to make 10 dunks in a game.

== National team career ==
Kessler played for the United States national team during the 2023 FIBA World Cup. For the tournament, he averaged 4.0 points, 2.3 rebounds, and 1.3 blocks while helping the team secure a fourth-place finish.

== Career statistics ==
Legend
GP	Games played	GS	Games started	MPG	Minutes per game
FG%	Field goal percentage	3P%	3-point field goal percentage	FT%	Free throw percentage
RPG	Rebounds per game	APG	Assists per game	SPG	Steals per game
BPG	Blocks per game	PPG	Points per game	**Bold**	Career high

=== NBA ===
Year	Team	GP	GS	MPG	FG%	3P%	FT%	RPG	APG	SPG	BPG	PPG
2022–23	Utah	**74**	40	23.0	**.720**	.333	.516	8.4	**.9**	.4	2.3	9.2
2023–24	Utah	64	22	23.3	.654	.211	.602	7.5	.9	.5	**2.4**	8.1
2024–25	Utah	58	**58**	30.0	.663	.176	.520	**12.2**	1.7	.6	**2.4**	11.1
2025–26	Utah	5	5	**30.8**	.703	**.750**	**.700**	10.8	**3.0**	**1.4**	1.8	**14.4**
Career		201	125	25.3	.681	.266	.545	9.3	1.2	.5	2.4	9.5

=== College ===
*	Led NCAA Division I

Year	Team	GP	GS	MPG	FG%	3P%	FT%	RPG	APG	SPG	BPG	PPG
2020–21	North Carolina	29	0	8.8	.578	**.250**	.537	3.2	.3	.5	.9	4.4
2021–22	Auburn	**34**	**34**	**25.6**	**.608**	.200	**.596**	**8.1**	**.9**	**1.1**	**4.6***	**11.4**
Career		63	34	17.9	.601	.204	.577	5.8	.6	.8	2.9	8.2

== Personal life ==
Kessler's father, Chad, and his uncle, Alec, played college basketball at Georgia and were drafted into the NBA before becoming orthopedic surgeons. His brother, Houston, also played basketball at Georgia.
