= Antonio Conde =

Spanish basketball referee (born 1973)

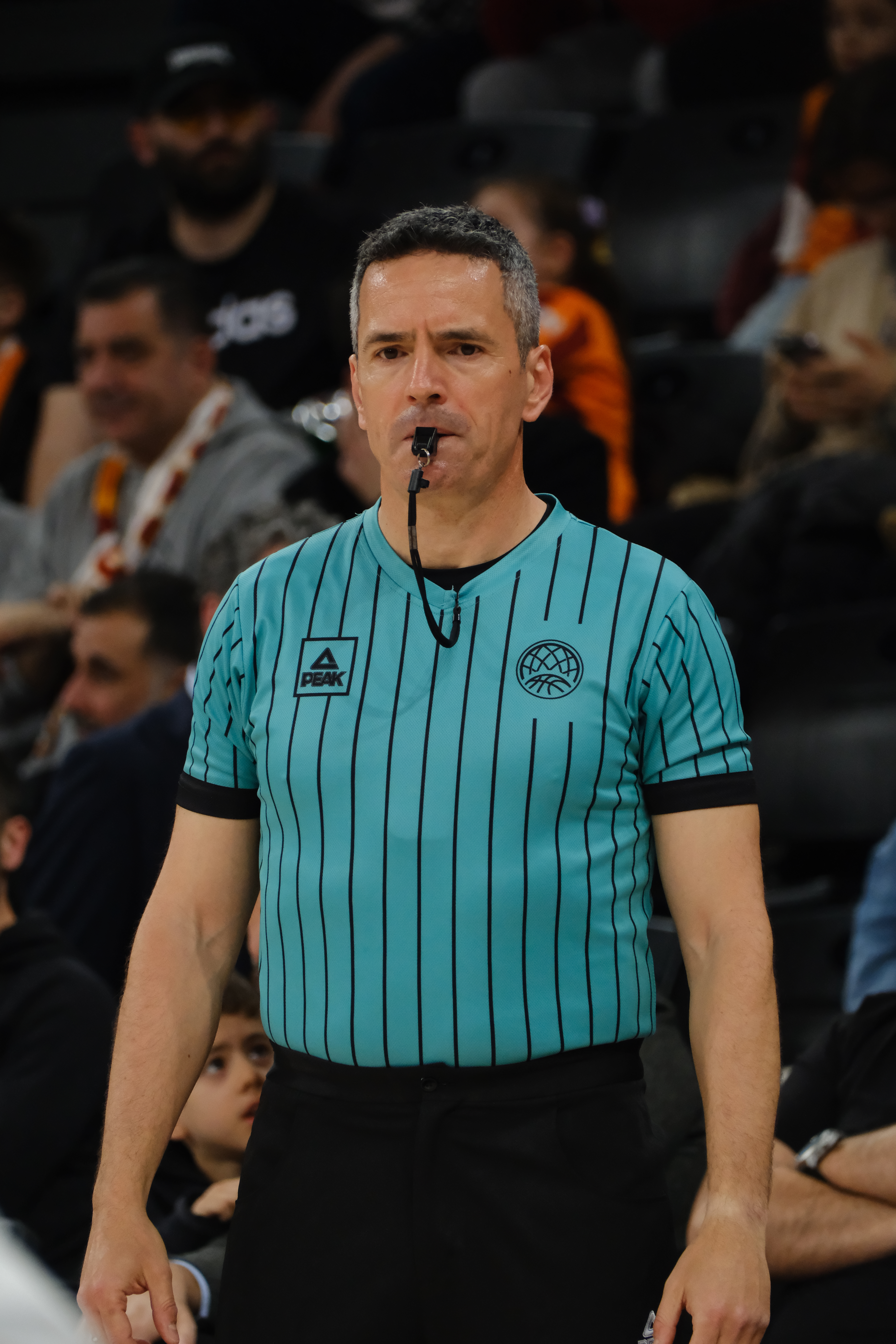
- League: Liga ACB

Personal information
- Born: May 12, 1973 (age 53) Córdoba, Spain

Antonio Rafael Conde Ruiz (born 12 May 1973) is a Spanish basketball referee officiating in the Liga ACB and internationally under the auspices of FIBA, presently recognized as one of Europe's most experienced basketball officials.

He belongs to the Andalusian Referees Committee and has served as a leading referee in numerous high-profile international tournaments.

== Career ==
Conde began refereeing in 1989 and debuted in the Liga ACB on 29 September 2001 during an Estudiantes vs. Girona match. Over his career, he has officiated in many ACB finals and seven Copa del Rey finals.

Internationally, Conde has participated in:

- Women's World Championship 2006 in Brazil
- FIBA Women's European Championship 2009 and Women's World Championship 2014
- EuroBasket 2017, including the final between Slovenia and Serbia
- Men's World Championship 2023
- Two Olympic Games: Tokyo 2020 and Paris 2024.

At Paris 2024, he served as lead referee in the gold-medal final between France and the United States. In addition, at Paris 2024 Olympic Games, Conde officiated four group-stage matches, the Brazil–USA quarter-final, and the France–Germany semi-final.

Conde is among four Spanish referees selected for the FIBA EuroBasket 2025.

== Recognition ==
In August 2025, the Spanish Basketball Federation (FEB) honored Conde during the VI Gala del Baloncesto Español for his designation as the referee for the 2024 Olympic final. The award was presented at the Hipódromo de la Zarzuela in Madrid.

Earlier, he also received recognition in Córdoba by the Andalusian Basketball Federation.
