= Germany men's national basketball team results (2020–present) =

This is a list of the Germany men's national basketball team results from 2020 to present.

== Results and fixtures ==
Win Loss

=== 2020 ===
21 February 2020 EuroBasket 2022 qualifiers	Germany	83–69	France	Vechta, Germany
20:00 CET (UTC+1)	Scoring by quarter: 15–16, 26–18, 24–20, 18–15
	Pts: Benzing 22; Rebs: Jallow, Zirbes 8 Asts: Akpınar 5	Boxscore	Pts: Michineau 16; Rebs: Fall 8 Asts: three players 2	Arena: RASTA Dome; Attendance: 3,140; Referees: Manuel Mazzoni (ITA), Boris Krejič (SLO), Saša Maričić (SRB)

24 February 2020 EuroBasket 2022 qualifiers	Great Britain	81–73	Germany	Newcastle, England
20:00 (UTC+0)	Scoring by quarter: 17–22, 23–17, 16–22, 25–12
	Pts: Nelson 26; Rebs: Soko 10; Asts: Hesson 5	Boxscore	Pts: Obst 24; Rebs: four players 6 Asts: Saibou 6	Arena: Eagles Community Arena; Attendance: 2,800; Referees: Ademir Zurapović (BIH), Michał Proć (POL), Tanel Suslov (EST)

27 November 2020 EuroBasket 2022 qualifiers	Germany	74–80	Montenegro	Pau, France* (Note: Due to the COVID-19 pandemic, all matches in the November 2020 and February 2021 windows were played behind closed doors in select host cities.)
21:00 CET (UTC+1)	Scoring by quarter: 24–18, 15–20, 16–21, 19–21
	Pts: Benzing 21; Rebs: Obst 5 Asts: Obst 4	Boxscore	Pts: Cobbs 20; Rebs: Nikolić 8 Asts: Cobbs 6	Arena: Palais des Sports de Pau; Referees: Manuel Mazzoni (ITA), Luis Castillo (ESP), Gatis Saliņš (LAT)

29 November 2020 EuroBasket 2022 qualifiers	France	86–74	Germany	Pau, France*
15:00 CET (UTC+1)	Scoring by quarter: 25–22, 17–19, 19–18, 25–15
	Pts: Ouattara 24; Rebs: Bouteille, M'Baye 5 Asts: Albicy 7	Boxscore	Pts: Obst 16; Rebs: Jallow 5 Asts: Akpınar 4	Arena: Palais des Sports de Pau; Referees: Oskars Lūcis (LAT), Lorenzo Baldini (ITA), Gatis Saliņš (LAT)

=== 2021 ===
20 February 2021 EuroBasket 2022 qualifiers	Germany	81–83	Great Britain	Podgorica, Montenegro*
17:00 CET (UTC+1)	Scoring by quarter: 21–28, 24–19, 23–19, 13–17
	Pts: Zirbes 14; Rebs: four players 5 Asts: Wimberg 4	Boxscore	Pts: Olaseni 20; Rebs: Olaseni 8 Asts: Mockford 5	Arena: Bemax Arena; Referees: Wojciech Liszka (POL), Tanel Suslov (EST), Beniamino Attard (ITA)

22 February 2021 EuroBasket 2022 qualifiers	Montenegro	82–75	Germany	Podgorica, Montenegro*
20:00 CET (UTC+1)	Scoring by quarter: 24–22, 21–10, 17–22, 20–21
	Pts: Ivanović 26; Rebs: Radončić 9 Asts: Ivanović 8	Boxscore	Pts: Akpınar 19; Rebs: Ogbe 9 Asts: Akpınar 3	Arena: Bemax Arena; Referees: Antonio Conde (ESP), Martin Horozov (BUL), Wojciech Liszka (POL)

18 June 2021 DBB Supercup 2021	Germany	95–62	Czech Republic	Hamburg, Germany
20:30 CEST (UTC+2)	Scoring by quarter: 27–17, 24–16, 28–13, 16–16
	Pts: Saibou 20; Rebs: M. Wagner 8 Asts: Voigtmann 7	Boxscore	Pts: Šiřina 21; Rebs: Balvín, Vyoral 5 Asts: Schilb 5	Arena: Edel-optics.de Arena

19 June 2021 DBB Supercup 2021	Germany	102–75	Tunisia	Hamburg, Germany
20:30 CEST (UTC+2)	Scoring by quarter: 29–19, 26–14, 26–19, 21–23
	Pts: Saibou 22; Rebs: Stanić 6 Asts: Saibou 11	Boxscore	Pts: Marnaoui 31; Rebs: Slimane 5 Asts: Haddad 4	Arena: Edel-optics.de Arena

20 June 2021 DBB Supercup 2021	Germany	91–79	Italy	Hamburg, Germany
20:30 CEST (UTC+2)	Scoring by quarter: 22–18, 20–28, 29–12, 20–21
	Pts: Saibou 18; Rebs: Voigtmann 9 Asts: Voigtmann 7	Boxscore	Pts: Melli 21; Rebs: Polonara 9 Asts: Ruzzier 6	Arena: Edel-optics.de Arena

29 June 2021 2020 Olympic Qualifying Tournament GS	Germany	82–76	Mexico	Split, Croatia
16:30 CEST (UTC+2)	Scoring by quarter: 19–22, 21–20, 22–25, 20–9
	Pts: Saibou 17; Rebs: Voigtmann 10; Asts: Voigtmann 5	Boxscore	Pts: Cruz 30; Rebs: Ayón 15; Asts: Cruz, Stoll 6	Arena: Spaladium Arena; Referees: Matthew Kallio (CAN), Eddie Viator (FRA), Takaki Kato (JPN)

1 July 2021 2020 Olympic Qualifying Tournament GS	Russia	67–69	Germany	Split, Croatia
16:30 CEST (UTC+2)	Scoring by quarter: 17–15, 18–17, 18–18, 14–19
	Pts: Vorontsevich 17; Rebs: Antonov 8 Asts: Astapkovich 4	Boxscore	Pts: Voigtmann 13; Rebs: Voigtmann 7 Asts: Benzing, Saibou 3	Arena: Spaladium Arena; Referees: Jorge Vázquez (PUR), Michael Weiland (CAN), Takaki Kato (JPN)

3 July 2021 2020 Olympic Qualifying Tournament SF	Germany	86–76	Croatia	Split, Croatia
16:00 CEST (UTC+2)	Scoring by quarter: 19–23, 24–22, 13–18, 30–13
	Pts: Lô 29; Rebs: Barthel 6 Asts: Lô 8	Boxscore	Pts: Bogdanović 38; Rebs: Hezonja, Žižić 6 Asts: Hezonja 3	Arena: Spaladium Arena; Referees: Matthew Kallio (CAN), Jorge Vázquez (PUR), Michael Weiland (CAN)

4 July 2021 2020 Olympic Qualifying Tournament F	Germany	75–64	Brazil	Split, Croatia
19:30 CEST (UTC+2)	Scoring by quarter: 14–17, 22–17, 16–12, 23–18
	Pts: M. Wagner 28; Rebs: Voigtmann 11; Asts: Lô 5	Boxscore	Pts: Varejão 14; Rebs: Benite, Caboclo 5 Asts: Benite, Marcelinho 3	Arena: Spaladium Arena; Referees: Ademir Zurapović (BIH), Matthew Kallio (CAN), Michael Weiland (CAN)

25 July 2021 2020 Summer Olympics Group stage	Germany	82–92	Italy	Saitama, Japan
13:40 (UTC+9)	Scoring by quarter: 32–22, 14–21, 26–25, 10–24
	Pts: Lô 24; Rebs: Voigtmann 6 Asts: three players 4	Boxscore	Pts: Fontecchio 20; Rebs: Melli 9 Asts: Mannion 7	Arena: Saitama Super Arena; Referees: Antonio Conde (ESP), Ahmed Al-Shuwaili (IRQ), Yevgeniy Mikheyev (KAZ)

28 July 2021 2020 Summer Olympics Group stage	Nigeria	92–99	Germany	Saitama, Japan
10:00 (UTC+9)	Scoring by quarter: 21–24, 29–26, 24–24, 18–25
	Pts: Nwora 33; Rebs: Nwora 7 Asts: Emegano 6	Boxscore	Pts: Voigtmann 19; Rebs: Thiemann 10; Asts: Lo 9	Arena: Saitama Super Arena; Referees: Omar Bermúdez (MEX), Mārtiņš Kozlovskis (LAT), Rabah Noujaim (LBN)

31 July 2021 2020 Summer Olympics Group stage	Australia	89–76	Germany	Saitama, Japan
17:20 (UTC+9)	Scoring by quarter: 18–22, 26–18, 22–19, 23–17
	Pts: Mills 24; Rebs: Ingles 5 Asts: Mills 6	Boxscore	Pts: Obst 17; Rebs: Voigtmann 13; Asts: Lô 5	Arena: Saitama Super Arena; Referees: Juan Fernández (ARG), Steven Anderson (USA), Omar Bermudez (MEX)

3 August 2021 2020 Summer Olympics Quarter-finals	Slovenia	94–70	Germany	Saitama, Japan
10:00 (UTC+9)	Scoring by quarter: 25–14, 19–23, 22–17, 28–16
	Pts: Dragić 27; Rebs: Tobey 11; Asts: Dončić 11	Boxscore	Pts: Lô 11; Rebs: Bonga 7 Asts: Bonga 3	Arena: Saitama Super Arena; Referees: Ademir Zurapović (BIH), Matthew Kallio (CAN), Omar Bermudez (MEX)

25 November 2021 2023 FIBA World Cup qualifiers – 1st round	Germany	66–69	Estonia	Nuremberg
19:00	Scoring by quarter: 18–17, 16–13, 19–25, 13–14
	Pts: Sengfelder 21; Rebs: Sengfelder 8 Asts: Benzing, Hollatz 3	Boxscore	Pts: Kullamäe, Vene 15; Rebs: Nurger 6 Asts: Kullamäe 7	Arena: KIA Metropol Arena; Attendance: 900; Referees: Boris Krejić (SLO), Andrei Sharapa (BLR), Geert Jacobs (BEL)
Note:

28 November 2021 2023 FIBA World Cup qualifiers – 1st round	Poland	69–72	Germany	Lublin
20:00	Scoring by quarter: 13–16, 17–24, 21–21, 18–11
	Pts: Schenk 17; Rebs: Balcerowski, Kolenda 6 Asts: Schenk 7	Boxscore	Pts: Kramer 24; Rebs: Kratzer, Lockhart 7 Asts: Hollatz 7	Arena: Globus Arena; Attendance: 3,002; Referees: Yohan Rosso (FRA), Mārtiņš Kozlovskis (LAT), Igor Mitrovski (MKD)

=== 2022 ===
25 February 2022 2023 FIBA World Cup qualifiers – 1st round	Israel	67–71	Germany	Tel Aviv
14:30	Scoring by quarter: 15–12, 18–23, 18–14, 16–22
	Pts: Ginat 20; Rebs: Ginat 7 Asts: Timor 6	Boxscore	Pts: Benzing 17; Rebs: Krämer 7 Asts: Hollatz 8	Arena: Drive in Arena; Attendance: 3,500; Referees: Ademir Zurapović (BIH), Fernando Calatrava (ESP), Beniamino Attard (ITA)
Note:

28 February 2022 2023 FIBA World Cup qualifiers – 1st round	Germany	84–80	Israel	Heidelberg
19:30	Scoring by quarter: 20–20, 19–14, 15–31, 30–15
	Pts: Lô 18; Rebs: Thiemann 9 Asts: Lô 7	Boxscore	Pts: Ginat 18; Rebs: Ginat 10; Asts: Blatt 6	Arena: SNP Dome; Attendance: 2,413; Referees: Marius Ciulin (ROU), Radomir Vojinović (MNE), Alexandre Deman (FRA)
Note:

30 June 2022 2023 FIBA World Cup qualifiers – 1st round	Estonia	57–88	Germany	Tallinn
19:00	Scoring by quarter: 11–18, 11–13, 16–36, 19–21
	Pts: Kotsar 13; Rebs: Kotsar 7 Asts: Kullamäe, Treier 4	Boxscore	Pts: Sengfelder 23; Rebs: Sengfelder 9 Asts: Schröder 9	Arena: Saku Suurhall; Attendance: 4,326; Referees: Nicolás Maestre (FRA), Thomas Bissuel (FRA), Zdenko Tomašovič (SVK)
Note:

3 July 2022 2023 FIBA World Cup qualifiers – 1st round	Germany	93–83	Poland	Bremen
18:00	Scoring by quarter: 19–19, 21–17, 17–20, 36–27
	Pts: Schröder 38; Rebs: Voigtmann 10; Asts: Schröder 5	Boxscore	Pts: Slaughter 32; Rebs: Balcerowski 7 Asts: Ponitka 5	Arena: ÖVB Arena; Attendance: 6,359; Referees: Marius Ciulin (ROU), Petr Hrůša (CZE), Gintaras Mačiulis (LTU)
Note:

19 August 2022 DBB Supercup 2022	Germany	101–90	Czech Republic	Hamburg, Germany
20:30 CEST (UTC+2)	Scoring by quarter: 20–21, 36–23, 19–18, 26–28
	Pts: F. Wagner 26; Rebs: Kratzer 7 Asts: Schröder 6	Boxscore	Pts: Hruban 21; Rebs: Balvín 8 Asts: Satoranský, Sehnal 4	Arena: Barclays Arena; Attendance: 4,400

20 August 2022 DBB Supercup 2022	Germany	56–83	Serbia	Hamburg, Germany
18:30 CEST (UTC+2)	Scoring by quarter: 13–24, 18–14, 10–27, 15–18
	Pts: Obst 12; Rebs: Voigtmann 4 Asts: Hollatz, Weiler-Babb 3	Boxscore	Pts: Jokić 22; Rebs: Milutinov 7 Asts: Micić 4	Arena: Barclays Arena

25 August 2022 2023 FIBA World Cup qualifiers – 2nd round	Sweden	50–67	Germany	Stockholm, Sweden
18:30 CEST (UTC+2)	Scoring by quarter: 9–25, 20–21, 13–8, 8–13
	Pts: Pantzar 11; Rebs: Birgander 10; Asts: Njie 3	Boxscore	Pts: F. Wagner 16; Rebs: Wohlfarth-Bottermann 12; Asts: F. Wagner 5	Arena: Hovet; Attendance: 5,460; Referees: Georgios Poursanidis (GRE), Kerem Baki (TUR), Igor Mitrovski (MKD)

28 August 2022 2023 FIBA World Cup qualifiers – 2nd round	Germany	90–71	Slovenia	Munich, Germany
15:00 CEST (UTC+2)	Scoring by quarter: 17–20, 16–11, 28–15, 29–25
	Pts: Schröder 17; Rebs: Voigtmann 14; Asts: Schröder 10	Boxscore	Pts: Dončić 23; Rebs: Dončić 6 Asts: Dončić 5	Arena: Audi Dome; Attendance: 6,136; Referees: Yohan Rosso (FRA), Nicolas Maestre (FRA), Fernando Calatrava (ESP)

1 September 2022 EuroBasket 2022 – Group stage	France	63–76	Germany	Lanxess Arena, Cologne
20:30	Scoring by quarter: 13–17, 18–21, 12–19, 20–19
	Pts: Yabusele 18; Rebs: Gobert 12; Asts: Heurtel 8	Boxscore	Pts: Thiemann 14; Rebs: three players 6 Asts: Lô, Schröder 5	Attendance: 18,017; Referees: Georgios Poursanidis (GRE), Lorenzo Baldini (ITA), Michał Proc (POL)
Note:

3 September 2022 EuroBasket 2022 – Group stage	Germany	92–82	Bosnia and Herzegovina	Lanxess Arena, Cologne
14:30	Scoring by quarter: 18–20, 24–27, 28–11, 22–24
	Pts: Schröder, Wagner 18; Rebs: Theis 6 Asts: Schröder 9	Boxscore	Pts: Musa 30; Rebs: Nurkić 7 Asts: three players 4	Attendance: 18,017; Referees: Wojciech Liszka (POL), Lorenzo Baldini (ITA), Marius Ciulin (ROU)
Note:

4 September 2022 EuroBasket 2022 – Group stage	Lithuania	107–109(2OT)	Germany	Lanxess Arena, Cologne
14:30	Scoring by quarter: 19–19, 22–27, 24–20, 24–23, Overtime: 7–7, 11–13
	Pts: Valančiūnas 34; Rebs: Valančiūnas 14; Asts: Valančiūnas 5	Boxscore	Pts: Wagner 32; Rebs: Wagner 8 Asts: Schröder 8	Attendance: 18,017; Referees: Manuel Mazzoni (ITA), Wojciech Liszka (POL), Michał Proc (POL)
Note:

6 September 2022 EuroBasket 2022 – Group stage	Germany	80–88	Slovenia	Lanxess Arena, Cologne
20:30	Scoring by quarter: 14–21, 22–23, 19–17, 25–27
	Pts: Schröder 19; Rebs: Voigtmann 12; Asts: Schröder 5	Boxscore	Pts: Dončić 36; Rebs: Dončić 10; Asts: Dončić 4	Attendance: 18,017; Referees: Mārtiņš Kozlovskis (LAT), Lorenzo Baldini (ITA), Martin Horozov (BUL)
Note:

7 September 2022 EuroBasket 2022 – Group stage	Hungary	71–106	Germany	Lanxess Arena, Cologne
20:30	Scoring by quarter: 19–22, 20–32, 19–27, 13–25
	Pts: Perl 15; Rebs: Perl 4 Asts: Perl, Vojvoda 4	Boxscore	Pts: Sengfelder 22; Rebs: Voigtmann 10; Asts: Hollatz 11	Attendance: 17,513; Referees: Andris Aunkrogers (LAT), Ivor Matějek (CZE), Ilias Kounelles (CYP)
Note:

10 September 2022 EuroBasket 2022 – Round of 16	Germany	85–79	Montenegro	Mercedes-Benz Arena, Berlin
18:00	Scoring by quarter: 19–10, 29–14, 19–26, 18–29
	Pts: Schröder 22; Rebs: Wagner 5 Asts: Schröder 8	Boxscore	Pts: Perry 25; Rebs: Simonović 9 Asts: Perry 6	Attendance: 12,938; Referees: Luis Castillo (ESP), Mārtiņš Kozlovskis (LAT), Paulo Marques (POR)
Note:

13 September 2022 EuroBasket 2022 – Quarter-finals	Germany	107–96	Greece	Mercedes-Benz Arena, Berlin
20:30	Scoring by quarter: 31–27, 26–34, 26–10, 24–25
	Pts: Schröder 26; Rebs: Theis 16; Asts: Schröder 8	Boxscore	Pts: G. Antetokounmpo 31; Rebs: G. Antetokounmpo 7 Asts: G. Antetokounmpo 8	Attendance: 14,073; Referees: Ademir Zurapović (BIH), Saverio Lanzarini (ITA), Boris Krejić (SLO)

16 September 2022 EuroBasket 2022 – Semi-finals	Germany	91–96	Spain	Mercedes-Benz Arena, Berlin
20:30	Scoring by quarter: 24–27, 27–19, 20–19, 20–31
	Pts: Schröder 30; Rebs: Obst 5 Asts: Schröder 8	Boxscore	Pts: Brown 29; Rebs: R. Fernández 6 Asts: Garuba 7	Attendance: 14,073; Referees: Ademir Zurapović (BIH), Boris Krejić (SLO), Kerem Baki (TUR)

18 September 2022 EuroBasket 2022 – Third place game	Germany	82–69	Poland	Mercedes-Benz Arena, Berlin
17:15	Scoring by quarter: 19–14, 17–9, 18–26, 28–20
	Pts: Schröder 26; Rebs: Voigtmann 9 Asts: Voigtmann 6	Boxscore	Pts: Sokołowski 18; Rebs: Sokołowski 6 Asts: Slaughter 10	Attendance: 12,913; Referees: Antonio Conde (ESP), Yohan Rosso (FRA), Kerem Baki (TUR)
Note:

11 November 2022 2023 FIBA World Cup qualifiers – 2nd round	Germany	94–80	Finland	Bamberg, Germany
19:30 CET (UTC+1)	Scoring by quarter: 22–19, 22–17, 25–16, 25–28
	Pts: Krämer, Sengfelder 19; Rebs: Schilling 9 Asts: Hollatz 9	Boxscore	Pts: Murphy 20; Rebs: Jantunen 6 Asts: Maxhuni 4	Arena: Brose Arena; Attendance: 3,927; Referees: Manuel Mazzoni (ITA), Mārtiņš Kozlovskis (LAT), Radomir Vojinović (MNE)

14 November 2022 2023 FIBA World Cup qualifiers – 2nd round	Slovenia	81–75	Germany	Koper, Slovenia
18:00 CET (UTC+1)	Scoring by quarter: 16–24, 25–10, 20–14, 20–27
	Pts: Morgan 22; Rebs: Morgan 13; Asts: Samar 12	Boxscore	Pts: Krämer 21; Rebs: Schilling 8 Asts: Doreth 7	Arena: Arena Bonifika; Attendance: 1,319; Referees: Antonio Conde (ESP), Yener Yılmaz (TUR), Gatis Saliņš (LAT)

=== 2023 ===
24 February 2023 2023 FIBA World Cup qualifiers – 2nd round	Germany	73–66	Sweden	Frankfurt, Germany
19:30 CET (UTC+1)	Scoring by quarter: 21–19, 19–12, 17–14, 16–21
	Pts: Krämer 13; Rebs: Richter 14; Asts: Voigtmann 6	Boxscore	Pts: Spires 13; Rebs: Bangala, Pantzar 7 Asts: Pantzar 6	Arena: Süwag Energie Arena; Attendance: 5,002; Referees: Nicolas Maestre (FRA), Gvidas Gedvilas (LTU), Beniamino Attard (ITA)

27 February 2023 2023 FIBA World Cup qualifiers – 2nd round	Finland	81–87	Germany	Espoo, Finland
18:30 EET (UTC+2)	Scoring by quarter: 22–17, 21–29, 19–23, 19–18
	Pts: Jantunen 20; Rebs: Jantunen 6 Asts: Maxhuni 6	Boxscore	Pts: Voigtmann 23; Rebs: Voigtmann 9 Asts: Hollatz 14	Arena: Espoo Metro Areena; Attendance: 6,504; Referees: Mārtiņš Kozlovskis (LAT), Aleksandar Glišić (SRB), Viola Györgyi (NOR)

5 August 2023 Friendly	Germany	87–68	Sweden	Bonn, Germany
19:00 CEST (UTC+2)	Scoring by quarter: 18–16, 24–26, 18–19, 27–7
	Pts: F. Wagner 15; Rebs: M. Wagner 9 Asts: Schröder 5	Boxscore	Pts: Spires 13; Rebs: Clarance 6 Asts: four players 1	Arena: Telekom Dome; Attendance: 6,015

9 August 2023 Friendly	Germany	86–81	Canada	Berlin, Germany
19:30 CEST (UTC+2)	Scoring by quarter: 27–14, 23–20, 16–24, 20–23
	Pts: F. Wagner 18	Boxscore	Pts: Dort 14	Arena: Mercedes-Benz Arena

12 August 2023 DBB Supercup 2023	Germany	107–58	China	Hamburg, Germany
18:30 CEST (UTC+2)	Scoring by quarter: 25–12, 24–11, 32–18, 26–17
	Pts: F. Wagner 20; Rebs: Voigtmann 8 Asts: Schröder 7	Boxscore	Pts: Fu, Li Kaier 10; Rebs: Li Kaier 6 Asts: Zhao J. 6	Arena: Edel-optics.de Arena; Attendance: 3,400

13 August 2023 DBB Supercup 2023	Germany	112–113(OT)	Canada	Hamburg, Germany
18:30 CEST (UTC+2)	Scoring by quarter: 26–20, 23–25, 38–33, 14–23, Overtime: 11–12
	Pts: Schröder 26; Rebs: M. Wagner 7 Asts: Schröder 8	Boxscore	Pts: Barrett 31; Rebs: Gilgeous-Alexander 8 Asts: Gilgeous-Alexander 6	Arena: Edel-optics.de Arena; Attendance: 3,400

19 August 2023 Friendly	Greece	71–84	Germany	Abu Dhabi, United Arab Emirates
20:00 (UTC+4)	Scoring by quarter: 14–20, 18–13, 23–31, 16–20
	Pts: Mitoglou 16; Rebs: Mitoglou 7 Asts: Walkup 6	Boxscore	Pts: Schröder, Theis 15; Rebs: Theis 7 Asts: Schröder 6	Arena: Etihad Arena

20 August 2023 Friendly	United States	99–91	Germany	Abu Dhabi, United Arab Emirates
20:00 (UTC+4)	Scoring by quarter: 26–26, 20–28, 27–23, 26–14
	Pts: Edwards 34; Rebs: Jackson Jr. 8 Asts: four players 3	Boxscore	Pts: F. Wagner 17; Rebs: Theis 13; Asts: Schröder 10	Arena: Etihad Arena

25 August 2023 2023 FIBA World Cup – Group stage	Germany	81–63	Japan	Okinawa City, Japan
21:10 (UTC+9)	Scoring by quarter: 23–11, 30–20, 16–16, 12–16
	Pts: M. Wagner 25; Rebs: M. Wagner 9 Asts: Schröder, F. Wagner 5	Boxscore	Pts: Watanabe 20; Rebs: Hawkinson 10; Asts: three players 3	Arena: Okinawa Arena; Attendance: 6,397; Referees: Omar Bermúdez (MEX), Amy Bonner (USA), Waseem Husainy (CAN)

27 August 2023 2023 FIBA World Cup – Group stage	Australia	82–85	Germany	Okinawa City, Japan
17:30 (UTC+9)	Scoring by quarter: 25–24, 19–25, 22–13, 16–23
	Pts: Mills 21; Rebs: Cooks, Mills 5 Asts: Mills 6	Boxscore	Pts: Schröder 30; Rebs: Voigtmann 6 Asts: Schröder 8	Arena: Okinawa Arena; Attendance: 6,205; Referees: Matthew Kallio (CAN), Blanca Burns (USA), Omar Bermúdez (MEX)

29 August 2023 2023 FIBA World Cup – Group stage	Germany	101–75	Finland	Okinawa City, Japan
16:30 (UTC+9)	Scoring by quarter: 19–22, 28–17, 29–16, 25–20
	Pts: Bonga, Schröder 15; Rebs: Hollatz, Voigtmann 4 Asts: Lô 5	Boxscore	Pts: Nkamhoua 14; Rebs: Jantunen 5 Asts: Maxhuni 6	Arena: Okinawa Arena; Attendance: 6,037; Referees: Matthew Kallio (CAN), Martin Horozov (BUL), Wael Mostafa (EGY)

1 September 2023 2023 FIBA World Cup – 2nd Group stage	Germany	100–73	Georgia	Okinawa City, Japan
17:30 (UTC+9)	Scoring by quarter: 22–16, 21–25, 27–16, 30–16
	Pts: Lô 18; Rebs: M. Wagner 6 Asts: Schröder 7	Boxscore	Pts: Mamukelashvili 19; Rebs: Bitadze 6 Asts: McFadden 7	Arena: Okinawa Arena; Attendance: 5,852; Referees: Ademir Zurapović (BIH), Omar Bermúdez (MEX), Martin Horozov (BUL)

3 September 2023 2023 FIBA World Cup – 2nd Group stage	Germany	100–71	Slovenia	Okinawa City, Japan
20:10 (UTC+9)	Scoring by quarter: 11–25, 27–9, 30–18, 32–19
	Pts: Schröder 24; Rebs: M. Wagner 8 Asts: Schröder 10	Boxscore	Pts: Dončić 23; Rebs: Dončić 6 Asts: Dončić 6	Arena: Okinawa Arena; Attendance: 6,634; Referees: Ademir Zurapović (BIH), Jorge Vázquez (PUR), Omar Bermúdez (MEX)

6 September 2023 2023 FIBA World Cup – Quarter-finals	Germany	81–79	Latvia	Pasay, Philippines
16:45 (UTC+8)	Scoring by quarter: 13–16, 23–18, 26–25, 19–20
	Pts: F. Wagner 16; Rebs: Theis, F. Wagner 8 Asts: Schröder 4	Boxscore	Pts: Žagars 24; Rebs: R. Kurucs 10; Asts: Žagars 8	Arena: Mall of Asia Arena; Attendance: 7,584; Referees: Antonio Conde (ESP), Yohan Rosso (FRA), Martin Vulić (CRO)

8 September 2023 2023 FIBA World Cup – Semi-finals	United States	111–113	Germany	Pasay, Philippines
20:40 (UTC+8)	Scoring by quarter: 31–33, 29–26, 24–35, 27–19
	Pts: Edwards 23; Rebs: Edwards 8 Asts: Haliburton 8	Boxscore	Pts: Obst 24; Rebs: Theis, Voigtmann 7 Asts: Schröder 9	Arena: Mall of Asia Arena; Attendance: 11,011; Referees: Antonio Conde (ESP), Boris Krejič (SVN), Gatis Saliņš (LAT)

10 September 2023 2023 FIBA World Cup – Final	Germany	83–77	Serbia	Pasay, Philippines
20:40 (UTC+8)	Scoring by quarter: 23–26, 24–21, 22–10, 14–20
	Pts: Schröder 28; Rebs: Voigtmann 8 Asts: Voigtmann 3	Boxscore	Pts: Avramović 21; Rebs: N. Jović 8 Asts: Bogdanović 5	Arena: Mall of Asia Arena; Attendance: 12,022; Referees: Roberto Vázquez (PUR), Omar Bermúdez (MEX), Gatis Saliņš (LAT)

=== 2024 ===
22 February 2024 EuroBasket 2025 qualifiers	Germany	85–61	Montenegro	Ludwigsburg, Germany
19:30 CET (UTC+1)	Scoring by quarter: 28–10, 19–20, 11–20, 27–11
	Pts: Da Silva 19; Rebs: Da Silva 7 Asts: Weiler-Babb 5	Boxscore	Pts: Perry 16; Rebs: Nikolić 8 Asts: five players 1	Arena: MHPArena; Attendance: 4,141; Referees: Yohan Rosso (FRA), Paulo Marques (POR), Péter Praksch (HUN)

25 February 2024 EuroBasket 2025 qualifiers	Bulgaria	67–62	Germany	Botevgrad, Bulgaria
17:00 EET (UTC+2)	Scoring by quarter: 7–19, 21–8, 11–18, 28–17
	Pts: Miller-McIntyre 23; Rebs: four players 5 Asts: Miller-McIntyre 4	Boxscore	Pts: Da Silva 15; Rebs: Da Silva 12; Asts: Da Silva 4	Arena: Arena Botevgrad; Attendance: 4,500; Referees: Marius Ciulin (ROU), Martin Vulić (CRO), Vladimir Jevtović (SRB)

6 July 2024 Friendly	Germany	66–90	France	Cologne, Germany
16:00 CEST (UTC+2)	Scoring by quarter: 11–23, 17–25, 17–20, 21–22
	Pts: Schröder 23; Rebs: Voigtmann 11; Asts: Schröder 6	Boxscore	Pts: Wembanyama 25; Rebs: Gobert 7 Asts: three players 3	Arena: Lanxess Arena; Attendance: 18,500

8 July 2024 Friendly	France	65–70	Germany	Montpellier, France
21:00 CEST (UTC+2)	Scoring by quarter: 19–11, 20–28, 14–20, 12–11
	Pts: Batum, Coulibaly 11; Rebs: Gobert 9 Asts: Strazel 4	Boxscore	Pts: Schröder, F. Wagner 17; Rebs: Da Silva, Voigtmann 8 Asts: Schröder 4	Arena: Sud de France Arena; Attendance: 10,000

13 July 2024 Friendly	Germany	95–50	Netherlands	Hamburg, Germany
19:30 CEST (UTC+2)	Scoring by quarter: 26–10, 23–15, 26–15, 20–10
	Pts: Obst 18; Rebs: Voigtmann 7 Asts: Schröder 6	Boxscore	Pts: Van der Vuurst de Vries 14; Rebs: Kuta 6 Asts: Van der Vuurst de Vries 8	Arena: Barclays Arena; Attendance: 10,000

19 July 2024 Friendly	Germany	104–83	Japan	Berlin, Germany
20:00 CEST (UTC+2)	Scoring by quarter: 27–16, 29–15, 29–25, 19–27
	Pts: F. Wagner 27; Rebs: Voigtmann, F. Wagner 8 Asts: Schröder, Weiler-Babb 4	Boxscore	Pts: Hachimura 19; Rebs: Hawkinson 8 Asts: Togashi 5	Arena: Uber Arena; Attendance: 10,413

22 July 2024 Friendly	United States	92–88	Germany	London, England
20:00 BST (UTC+1)	Scoring by quarter: 29–19, 19–22, 20–30, 24–17
	Pts: James 20; Rebs: Embiid 8 Asts: Embiid 5	Boxscore	Pts: F. Wagner 18; Rebs: Voigtmann 8 Asts: Schröder 10	Arena: The O2 Arena; Attendance: 19,177

27 July 2024 2024 Summer Olympics Group stage	Germany	97–77	Japan	Lille, France
13:30 CEST (UTC+2)	Scoring by quarter: 28–21, 24–23, 22–17, 23–16
	Pts: F. Wagner 22; Rebs: Theis 7 Asts: Schröder 12	Boxscore	Pts: Hachimura 20; Rebs: Hawkinson 11; Asts: Kawamura 7	Arena: Stade Pierre-Mauroy; Attendance: 26,991; Referees: Antonio Conde (ESP), Boris Krejić (SVN), Amy Bonner (USA)

30 July 2024 2024 Summer Olympics Group stage	Brazil	73–86	Germany	Lille, France
21:00 CEST (UTC+2)	Scoring by quarter: 10–22, 30–18, 11–20, 22–26
	Pts: Yago 18; Rebs: Meindl 6 Asts: Yago 8	Boxscore	Pts: Schröder 20; Rebs: Voigtmann 8 Asts: Schröder 6	Arena: Stade Pierre-Mauroy; Attendance: 23,884; Referees: Antonio Conde (ESP), Omar Bermúdez (MEX), Gatis Saliņš (LAT)

2 August 2024 2024 Summer Olympics Group stage	France	71–85	Germany	Lille, France
21:00 CEST (UTC+2)	Scoring by quarter: 18–24, 9–24, 19–21, 25–16
	Pts: Wembanyama 14; Rebs: Wembanyama 12; Asts: Batum 3	Boxscore	Pts: Schröder, F. Wagner 26; Rebs: Theis 8 Asts: Schröder 9	Arena: Stade Pierre-Mauroy; Attendance: 26,860; Referees: Antonio Conde (ESP), Juan Fernández (ARG), Andrés Bartel (URU)

6 August 2024 2024 Summer Olympics Quarter-finals	Germany	76–63	Greece	Paris, France
11:00 CEST (UTC+2)	Scoring by quarter: 11–21, 25–15, 23–16, 17–11
	Pts: F. Wagner 18; Rebs: Theis 8 Asts: Schröder 8	Boxscore	Pts: Antetokounmpo 22; Rebs: Papanikolaou 9 Asts: Antetokounmpo 3	Arena: Accor Arena; Attendance: 12,288; Referees: Roberto Vázquez (PUR), Mārtiņš Kozlovskis (LAT), Johnny Batista (PUR)

8 August 2024 2024 Summer Olympics Semi-finals	France	73–69	Germany	Paris, France
17:30 CEST (UTC+2)	Scoring by quarter: 18–25, 15–8, 23–17, 17–19
	Pts: Yabusele 17; Rebs: three players 7 Asts: Wembanyama 4	Boxscore	Pts: Schröder 18; Rebs: Theis 11; Asts: Theis 6	Arena: Accor Arena; Attendance: 12,454; Referees: Antonio Conde (ESP), Boris Krejić (SVN), Wojciech Liszka (POL)

10 August 2024 2024 Summer Olympics Bronze medal game	Germany	83–93	Serbia	Paris, France
11:00 CEST (UTC+2)	Scoring by quarter: 21–30, 17–16, 25–26, 20–21
	Pts: F. Wagner 18; Rebs: F. Wagner 9 Asts: Schröder, Weiler-Babb 6	Boxscore	Pts: Jokić, Micić 19; Rebs: Jokić 12; Asts: Jokić 11	Arena: Accor Arena; Attendance: 12,406; Referees: Matthew Kallio (CAN), Yohan Rosso (FRA), Johnny Batista (PUR)

22 November 2024 EuroBasket 2025 qualifiers	Sweden	73–72	Germany	Stockholm, Sweden
18:30 CET (UTC+1)	Scoring by quarter: 26–18, 11–19, 18–19, 18–16
	Pts: Håkanson 22; Rebs: Birgander, Czerapowicz 6 Asts: Njie, Pantzar 3	Boxscore	Pts: Krämer 43; Rebs: Osetkowski 9 Asts: Osetkowski 5	Arena: Hovet; Attendance: 8,906; Referees: Georgios Poursanidis (GRE), Lorenzo Baldini (ITA), Marek Kúkelčík (SVK)

25 November 2024 EuroBasket 2025 qualifiers	Germany	80–61	Sweden	Heidelberg, Germany
19:30 CET (UTC+1)	Scoring by quarter: 23–19, 18–12, 19–17, 20–13
	Pts: Thiemann 16; Rebs: Thiemann 9 Asts: Kayil, Krämer 4	Boxscore	Pts: Njie 15; Rebs: Gaddefors 6 Asts: Pantzar 5	Arena: SNP Dome; Attendance: 4,380; Referees: Fernando Calatrava (ESP), Yener Yılmaz (TUR), Cecília Montgomery-Tóth (HUN)

=== 2025 ===
20 February 2025 EuroBasket 2025 qualifiers	Montenegro	76–95	Germany	Podgorica, Montenegro
19:00 CET (UTC+1)	Scoring by quarter: 17–26, 21–24, 13–25, 25–20
	Pts: Simonović 22; Rebs: Simonović 7 Asts: Popović 5	Boxscore	Pts: Thiemann 16; Rebs: Pleiß 7 Asts: Hollatz 6	Arena: Morača Sports Center; Attendance: 5,233; Referees: Yohan Rosso (FRA), Kerem Baki (TUR), Geert Jacobs (BEL)

23 February 2025 EuroBasket 2025 qualifiers	Germany	94–85	Bulgaria	Bamberg, Germany
17:30 CET (UTC+1)	Scoring by quarter: 28–21, 34–14, 13–22, 19–28
	Pts: Krämer 14; Rebs: Pleiß, Thiemann 6 Asts: three players 3	Boxscore	Pts: P. Ivanov 17; Rebs: Minchev 5 Asts: P. Ivanov 6	Arena: Brose Arena; Attendance: 5,500; Referees: Georgios Poursanidis (GRE), Petar Pešić (SRB), Martin Vulić (CRO)

8 August 2025 Friendly	Slovenia	89–103	Germany	Ljubljana, Slovenia
20:15 CEST (UTC+2)	Scoring by quarter: 26–29, 22–24, 14–27, 27–23
	Pts: Dončić 19; Rebs: Omić 6 Asts: Dončić 5	Boxscore	Pts: Krämer, F. Wagner 18; Rebs: O. Da Silva 10; Asts: Weidemann 6	Arena: Arena Stožice

10 August 2025 Friendly	Germany	80–70	Slovenia	Mannheim, Germany
17:30 CEST (UTC+2)	Scoring by quarter: 19–19, 23–11, 15–30, 23–10
	Pts: Schröder 18; Rebs: Thiemann 12; Asts: Schröder 6	Boxscore	Pts: Hrovat 15; Rebs: Omić 8 Asts: Hrovat 5	Arena: SAP Arena; Attendance: 13,631

15 August 2025 DBB Supercup 2025	Germany	73–71	Turkey	Munich, Germany
18:00 CEST (UTC+2)	Scoring by quarter: 17–25, 11–10, 21–16, 24–20
	Pts: Schröder 22; Rebs: Theis 6 Asts: Schröder 6	Boxscore	Pts: Şengün 25; Rebs: Şengün 9 Asts: Şengün 4	Arena: SAP Garden; Attendance: 11,500

16 August 2025 DBB Supercup 2025	Germany	81–91	Serbia	Munich, Germany
20:45 CEST (UTC+2)	Scoring by quarter: 15–18, 17–20, 23–32, 26–21
	Pts: F. Wagner 26; Rebs: Hollatz 5 Asts: Schröder 5	Boxscore	Pts: N. Jović 22; Rebs: Jokić 8 Asts: Jokić 7	Arena: SAP Garden; Attendance: 11,500

21 August 2025 Friendly	Spain	105–106(OT)	Germany	Madrid, Spain
21:00 CEST (UTC+2)	Scoring by quarter: 24–22, 14–23, 34–31, 22–18, Overtime: 11–12
	Pts: Brizuela 20; Rebs: W. Hernangómez, Yusta 7 Asts: De Larrea 6	Boxscore	Pts: Schröder 24; Rebs: Bonga 11; Asts: Schröder 10	Arena: Palacio de Deportes de la Comunidad de Madrid

23 August 2025 Friendly	Germany	95–78	Spain	Cologne, Germany
19:00 CEST (UTC+2)	Scoring by quarter: 24–11, 25–28, 16–15, 30–24
	Pts: F. Wagner 29; Rebs: Voigtmann 8 Asts: Schröder 9	Boxscore	Pts: De Larrea 14; Rebs: W. Hernangómez 10; Asts: W. Hernangómez, López-Arostegui 3	Arena: Lanxess Arena; Attendance: 18,517

27 August 2025 EuroBasket 2025 – Group stage	Montenegro	76–106	Germany	Tampere, Finland
16:30 EEST (UTC+3)	Scoring by quarter: 20–24, 23–22, 12–33, 21–27
	Pts: Vučević 23; Rebs: Vučević 10; Asts: Drobnjak 8	Boxscore	Pts: F. Wagner 22; Rebs: F. Wagner 8 Asts: Lô 6	Arena: Nokia Arena; Attendance: 3,495; Referees: Luis Castillo (ESP), Michał Proc (POL), Nicolas Maestre (FRA)

29 August 2025 EuroBasket 2025 – Group stage	Germany	105–83	Sweden	Tampere, Finland
13:30 EEST (UTC+3)	Scoring by quarter: 27–17, 32–25, 25–24, 21–17
	Pts: Schröder 23; Rebs: T. Da Silva 6 Asts: Schröder 7	Boxscore	Pts: Pantzar 18; Rebs: Njie 6 Asts: Njie 7	Arena: Nokia Arena; Attendance: 5,025; Referees: Ademir Zurapović (BIH), Michał Proc (POL), Ofer Manheim (ISR)

30 August 2025 EuroBasket 2025 – Group stage	Lithuania	88–107	Germany	Tampere, Finland
13:30 EEST (UTC+3)	Scoring by quarter: 20–32, 27–23, 25–28, 16–24
	Pts: Jokubaitis 20; Rebs: Tubelis 7 Asts: Sedekerskis 9	Boxscore	Pts: Schröder 26; Rebs: F. Wagner 7 Asts: Schröder 6	Arena: Nokia Arena; Attendance: 10,047; Referees: Ademir Zurapović (BIH), Luis Castillo (ESP), Boris Krejić (SVN)

1 September 2025 EuroBasket 2025 – Group stage	Germany	120–57	Great Britain	Tampere, Finland
16:30 EEST (UTC+3)	Scoring by quarter: 32–19, 26–12, 30–9, 32–17
	Pts: T. Da Silva 25; Rebs: Theis 9 Asts: F. Wagner 10	Boxscore	Pts: Hesson, Whelan 11; Rebs: Akin 10; Asts: Nelson 7	Arena: Nokia Arena; Attendance: 3,760; Referees: Ariadna Chueca (ESP), Nicolas Maestre (FRA), Zdenko Tomašovič (SVK)

3 September 2025 EuroBasket 2025 – Group stage	Finland	61–91	Germany	Tampere, Finland
20:30 EEST (UTC+3)	Scoring by quarter: 19–21, 17–29, 13–19, 12–22
	Pts: Nkamhoua 16; Rebs: Nkamhoua 11; Asts: Grandison, Little 3	Boxscore	Pts: F. Wagner 23; Rebs: three players 7 Asts: Schröder 9	Arena: Nokia Arena; Attendance: 12,900; Referees: Ademir Zurapović (BIH), Boris Krejić (SVN), Luis Castillo (ESP)

6 September 2025 EuroBasket 2025 – Round of 16	Germany	85–58	Portugal	Riga, Latvia
15:15 EEST (UTC+3)	Scoring by quarter: 17–12, 14–20, 21–19, 33–7
	Pts: Schröder, F. Wagner 16; Rebs: Bonga, F. Wagner 7 Asts: F. Wagner 5	Boxscore	Pts: Queta 18; Rebs: Queta 11; Asts: Gameiro, Lisboa 4	Arena: Xiaomi Arena; Attendance: 2,316; Referees: Antonio Conde (ESP), Martin Horozov (BUL), Martin Vulić (CRO)

10 September 2025 EuroBasket 2025 – Quarter-finals	Germany	99–91	Slovenia	Riga, Latvia
21:00 EEST (UTC+3)	Scoring by quarter: 21–32, 24–19, 25–23, 29–17
	Pts: F. Wagner 23; Rebs: Theis 9 Asts: Schröder 7	Boxscore	Pts: Dončić 39; Rebs: Dončić 10; Asts: Dončić 7	Arena: Xiaomi Arena; Attendance: 9,038; Referees: Wojciech Liszka (POL), Luis Castillo (ESP), Mārtiņš Kozlovskis (LAT)

12 September 2025 EuroBasket 2025 – Semi-finals	Germany	98–86	Finland	Riga, Latvia
17:00 EEST (UTC+3)	Scoring by quarter: 30–26, 31–21, 20–26, 17–13
	Pts: Schröder 26; Rebs: Theis 11; Asts: Schröder 12	Boxscore	Pts: Nkamhoua 21; Rebs: Markkanen, Nkamhoua 8 Asts: Little 5	Arena: Xiaomi Arena; Attendance: 10,047; Referees: Yohan Rosso (FRA), Antonio Conde (ESP), Boris Krejić (SVN)

14 September 2025 EuroBasket 2025 – Final	Turkey	83–88	Germany	Riga, Latvia
21:00 EEST (UTC+3)	Scoring by quarter: 22–24, 24–16, 21–26, 16–22
	Pts: Şengün 28; Rebs: Larkin 6 Asts: Larkin 9	Boxscore	Pts: Bonga 20; Rebs: F. Wagner 8 Asts: Schröder 12	Arena: Xiaomi Arena; Attendance: 11,000; Referees: Matthew Kallio (CAN), Ademir Zurapović (BIH), Yohan Rosso (FRA)

28 November 2025 2027 FIBA World Cup qualifiers – 1st round	Germany	89–69	Israel	Neu-Ulm, Germany
19:30 CET (UTC+1)	Scoring by quarter: 26–22, 24–9, 19–22, 20–16
	Pts: O. Da Silva 19; Rebs: Bonga 10; Asts: Hollatz 6	Boxscore	Pts: Sorkin 18; Rebs: Sorkin, Zoosman 7 Asts: Timor 4	Arena: Ratiopharm Arena; Attendance: 6,049; Referees: Boris Krejić (SVN), Valentin Oliot (FRA), Zafer Yılmaz (TUR)

1 December 2025 2027 FIBA World Cup qualifiers – 1st round	Cyprus	64–83	Germany	Limassol, Cyprus
19:00 EET (UTC+2)	Scoring by quarter: 17–20, 22–22, 9–27, 16–14
	Pts: Stylianou 16; Rebs: Michail 6 Asts: Michail 4	Boxscore	Pts: Krämer, Pape 14; Rebs: Krämer 10; Asts: Kayil 5	Arena: Spyros Kyprianou Athletic Center; Attendance: 950; Referees: Lorenzo Baldini (ITA), Zdenko Tomašovič (SVK), Elvis Binders-Čoders (LAT)

=== 2026 ===
27 February 2026 2027 FIBA World Cup qualifiers – 1st round	Croatia	93–88	Germany	Zagreb, Croatia
20:00 CET (UTC+1)	Scoring by quarter: 20–26, 26–24, 29–22, 18–16
	Pts: Šarić 23; Rebs: Šarić 7 Asts: Mavra, Smith 6	Boxscore	Pts: Krämer 22; Rebs: Schneider 9 Asts: Kayil 5	Arena: Dražen Petrović Basketball Hall; Attendance: 4,700; Referees: Wojciech Liszka (POL), Gatis Saliņš (LAT), Ritvars Helmšteins (LAT)

1 March 2026 2027 FIBA World Cup qualifiers – 1st round	Germany	91–89(OT)	Croatia	Bonn, Germany
18:00 CET (UTC+1)	Scoring by quarter: 22–24, 19–26, 21–17, 15–10, Overtime: 14–12
	Pts: Thiemann 24; Rebs: Thiemann 12; Asts: Kayil 6	Boxscore	Pts: Hezonja 30; Rebs: Smith 9 Asts: Smith 9	Arena: Telekom Dome; Attendance: 6,032; Referees: Yohan Rosso (FRA), Andris Aunkrogers (LAT), Zdenko Tomašovič (SVK)

3 July 2026 2027 FIBA World Cup qualifiers – 1st round	Israel	86–92	Germany	Riga, Latvia
20:00 (UTC+3)	Scoring by quarter: 15–23, 22–22, 18–31, 31–16
	Pts: Madar 31; Rebs: Ginat 8 Asts: Ginat 7	Boxscore	Pts: Schröder 20; Rebs: Sengfelder 6 Asts: Schröder 9	Arena: Xiaomi Arena; Attendance: 100; Referees: Alberto Sánchez (ESP), Elvis Binders-Čoders (LAT), Ariadna Chueca (ESP)

6 July 2026 2027 FIBA World Cup qualifiers – 1st round	Germany	111–79	Cyprus	Bamberg, Germany
19:00 CEST (UTC+2)	Scoring by quarter: 22–21, 34–10, 30–25, 25–23
	Pts: Schröder 20; Rebs: Sengfelder 10; Asts: Schröder 9	Boxscore	Pts: Giannaras, F. Tigkas 14; Rebs: Mantovani 5 Asts: Giannaras, Iliadis 4	Arena: Brose Arena; Attendance: 5,713; Referees: Dariusz Zapolski (POL), Blaž Zupančič (SVN), Tomasz Langowski (POL)

21 August 2026 DBB Supercup 2026	Germany	115–82	Czech Republic	Hamburg, Germany
20:30 CEST (UTC+2)	Scoring by quarter: 24–21, 26–28, 36–17, 29–16
	Pts: Thiemann 20; Rebs: Thiemann 9 Asts: Schröder 10	Boxscore	Pts: Bálint 27; Rebs: Svoboda 7 Asts: Sýkora 4	Arena: Barclays Arena; Attendance: 8,793

22 August 2026 DBB Supercup 2026	Germany	96–87	Croatia	Hamburg, Germany
20:30 CEST (UTC+2)	Scoring by quarter: 24–24, 26–15, 28–30, 18–18
	Pts: O. Da Silva 22; Rebs: Schröder 7 Asts: Schröder 10	Boxscore	Pts: Hezonja, Zubac 19; Rebs: Zubac 13; Asts: Šarić 3	Arena: Barclays Arena; Attendance: 9,583

27 August 2026 2027 FIBA World Cup qualifiers – 2nd round	Germany	99–83	Netherlands	Cologne, Germany
20:00 CEST (UTC+2)	Scoring by quarter: 38–31, 26–19, 18–16, 17–17
	Pts: Schröder 23; Rebs: Olinde 7 Asts: Schröder 6	Boxscore	Pts: Franke 24; Rebs: D. N'Guessan 6 Asts: Van der Vuurst 6	Arena: Lanxess Arena; Attendance: 15,309; Referees: Gvidas Gedvilas (LTU), Yener Yılmaz (TUR), Geert Jacobs (BEL)

30 August 2026 2027 FIBA World Cup qualifiers – 2nd round	Poland	94–96(OT)	Germany	Gdańsk, Poland
14:45 CEST (UTC+2)	Scoring by quarter: 15–28, 16–13, 27–29, 25–13, Overtime: 11–13
	Pts: Ponitka 20; Rebs: Olejniczak 12; Asts: Pluta, Ponitka 5	Boxscore	Pts: Schröder 18; Rebs: Thiemann 12; Asts: Schröder 5	Arena: Ergo Arena; Attendance: 10,094; Referees: Ademir Zurapović (BIH), Boris Krejić (SVN), Gintaras Mačiulis (LTU)

27 November 2026 2027 FIBA World Cup qualifiers – 2nd round	Latvia	vs.	Germany	Latvia
--:-- EET (UTC+2)
		Boxscore

30 November 2026 2027 FIBA World Cup qualifiers – 2nd round	Germany	vs.	Poland	Germany
--:-- CET (UTC+1)
		Boxscore

=== 2027 ===
25 February 2027 2027 FIBA World Cup qualifiers – 2nd round	Netherlands	vs.	Germany	Netherlands
--:-- CET (UTC+1)
		Boxscore

28 February 2027 2027 FIBA World Cup qualifiers – 2nd round	Germany	vs.	Latvia	Germany
--:-- CET (UTC+1)
		Boxscore
