= 2023 FIBA Basketball World Cup Group E =

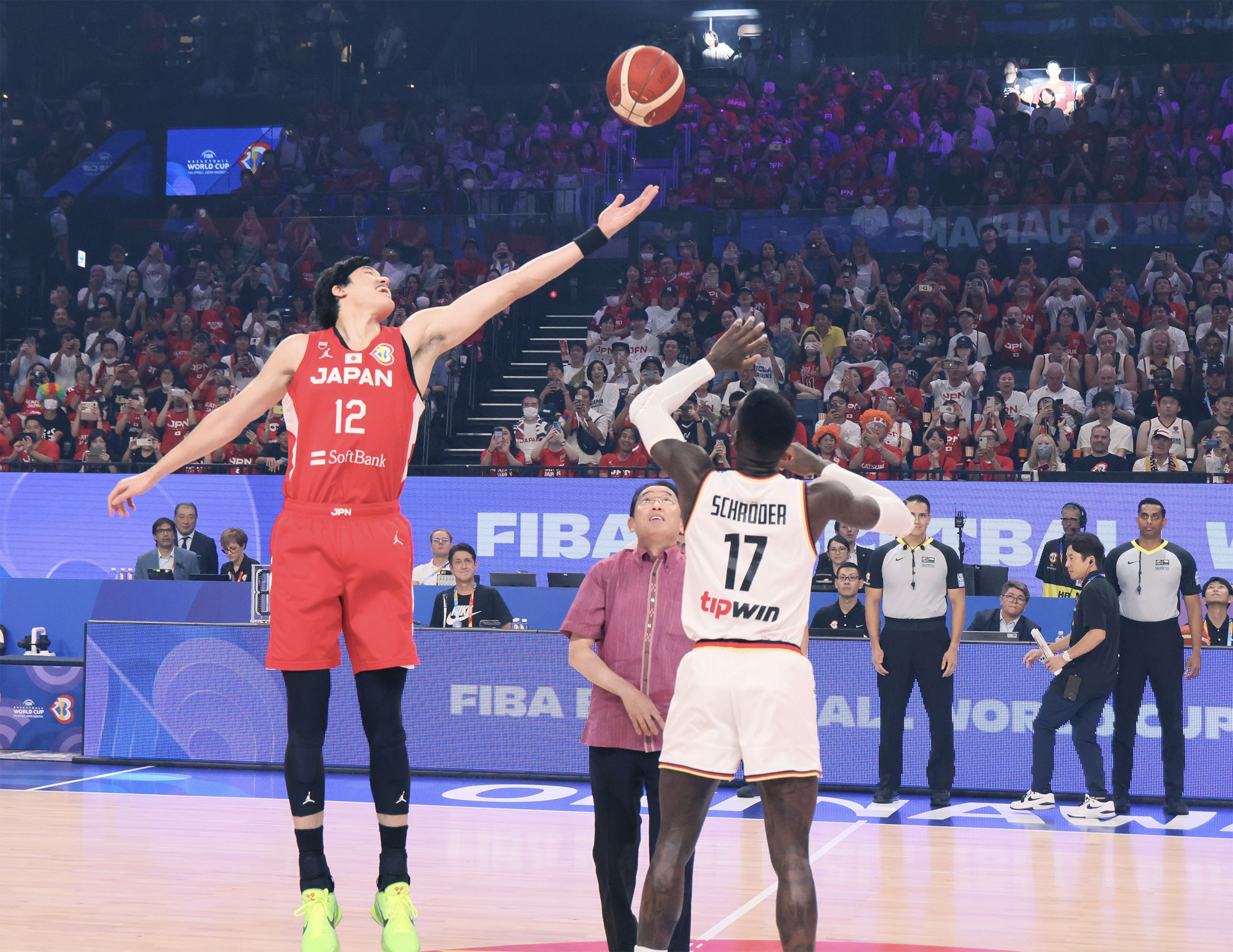
Ceremonial ball toss for the Japan v. Germany match.

Group E was one of eight groups of the preliminary round of the 2023 FIBA Basketball World Cup. It took place from 25 to 29 August 2023, and consisted of Australia, Finland, Germany, and Japan. Each team played each other once, for a total of three games per team, with all games played at the Okinawa Arena, Okinawa City, Japan. The top two teams advanced to the second round and the bottom two teams qualified for the classification rounds.

== Teams ==
Team	Qualification		Appearance			Best performance	WR
Team	As	Date	Last	Total	Streak	Best performance	WR
Germany	European Group J top three	11 November 2022	2019	7	2	3rd place (2002)	11
Finland	European Group J top three	28 August 2022	2014	2	1	22nd place (2014)	24
Australia	Asian Group F top three	11 November 2022	2019	13	5	4th place (2019)	3
Japan	Host	9 December 2017	2019	6	2	11th place (1967)	38

== Standings ==
Pos	Team	Pld	W	L	PF	PA	PD	Pts	Qualification
1	Germany	3	3	0	267	220	+47	6	Second round
2	Australia	3	2	1	289	246	+43	5	Second round
3	Japan (H)	3	1	2	250	278	−28	4	17th–32nd classification
4	Finland	3	0	3	235	297	−62	3	17th–32nd classification

Source: FIBA
Rules for classification: Tiebreakers
(H) Hosts

== Games ==
All times are local (UTC+9).

=== Finland vs. Australia ===
This was the first competitive game between Finland and Australia.

25 August 2023
17:00

Boxscore

Finland	72–98	Australia
Scoring by quarter: 21–17, 19–28, 14–25, 18–28
Pts: Markkanen 19; Rebs: Markkanen 8 Asts: Little, Markkanen 4		Pts: Mills 25; Rebs: Giddey 9 Asts: Giddey 8

Okinawa Arena, Okinawa City
Attendance: 5,729
Referees: Jorge Vázquez (PUR), Wojciech Liszka (POL), Blanca Burns (USA)

=== Germany vs. Japan ===
This was the second game between Germany and Japan in the World Cup. The Germans won the first meeting in 2006, which was the last competitive game between the two teams.

25 August 2023
21:10

Boxscore

Germany	81–63	Japan
Scoring by quarter: 23–11, 30–20, 16–16, 12–16
Pts: M. Wagner 25; Rebs: M. Wagner 9 Asts: Schröder, F. Wagner 5		Pts: Watanabe 20; Rebs: Hawkinson 10; Asts: three players 3

Okinawa Arena, Okinawa City
Attendance: 6,397
Referees: Omar Bermúdez (MEX), Amy Bonner (USA), Waseem Husainy (CAN)

=== Australia vs. Germany ===
This was the first game between Australia and Germany at the World Cup. The Australians won in the 2020 Olympics, which was the last competitive game between the two teams.

27 August 2023
17:30

Boxscore

Australia	82–85	Germany
Scoring by quarter: 25–24, 19–25, 22–13, 16–23
Pts: Mills 21; Rebs: Cooks, Mills 5 Asts: Mills 6		Pts: Schröder 30; Rebs: Voigtmann 6 Asts: Schröder 8

Okinawa Arena, Okinawa City
Attendance: 6,205
Referees: Matthew Kallio (CAN), Blanca Burns (USA), Omar Bermúdez (MEX)

=== Japan vs. Finland ===
This was the first competitive game between Japan and Finland.

27 August 2023
21:10

Boxscore

Japan	98–88	Finland
Scoring by quarter: 22–15, 14–31, 27–27, 35–15
Pts: Hawkinson 28; Rebs: Hawkinson 19; Asts: Kawamura 9		Pts: Markkanen 27; Rebs: Markkanen 12; Asts: four players 5

Okinawa Arena, Okinawa City
Attendance: 7,374
Referees: Ademir Zurapović (BIH), Amy Bonner (USA), Ahmed Al-Shuwaili (IRQ)

=== Germany vs. Finland ===
This was the first game between Germany and Finland in the World Cup. The Germans went 2–0 in their head-to-head matchups in the second round of the 2023 FIBA Basketball World Cup European Qualifiers.

29 August 2023
16:30

Boxscore

Germany	101–75	Finland
Scoring by quarter: 19–22, 28–17, 29–16, 25–20
Pts: Bonga, Schröder 15; Rebs: Hollatz, Voigtmann 4 Asts: Lô 5		Pts: Nkamhoua 14; Rebs: Jantunen 5 Asts: Maxhuni 6

Okinawa Arena, Okinawa City
Attendance: 6,037
Referees: Matthew Kallio (CAN), Martin Horozov (BUL), Wael Mostafa (EGY)

=== Australia vs. Japan ===
This was the first game between Australia and Japan in the World Cup. The Australians went 2–0 in their head-to-head matchups in the first round of the 2023 FIBA Basketball World Cup Asian Qualifiers, while both teams had a 1–1 split in their head-to-head games in the 2019 qualification phase. The Australians also won in the quarter-finals of the 2022 FIBA Asia Cup, which was the last competitive game between the two teams.

29 August 2023
20:10

Boxscore

Australia	109–89	Japan
Scoring by quarter: 25–17, 32–18, 30–35, 22–19
Pts: Giddey 26; Rebs: Cooks 16; Asts: Giddey 11		Pts: Hawkinson 33; Rebs: Hawkinson, Watanabe 7 Asts: Kawamura, Togashi 7

Okinawa Arena, Okinawa City
Attendance: 7,374
Referees: Jorge Vázquez (PUR), Amy Bonner (USA), Waseem Husainy (CAN)
