= 2023 FIBA Basketball World Cup Group K =

Group K was one of four groups of the second round of the 2023 FIBA Basketball World Cup. It took place from 1 to 3 September 2023 and consisted of the top-two teams from Groups E and F. The results from the preliminary round were carried over. The teams were playing against the teams from the other group, with all games played at the Okinawa Arena, Okinawa City, Japan. The top two teams advanced to the quarterfinals, the third placed team was classified 9 to 12 and the fourth placed team 13 to 16.

== Qualified teams ==
Group	Winner	Runner-up
E	Germany	Australia
F	Slovenia	Georgia

== Standings ==
Pos	Team	Pld	W	L	PF	PA	PD	Pts	Qualification
1	Germany	5	5	0	467	364	+103	10	Quarter-finals
2	Slovenia	5	4	1	442	409	+33	9	Quarter-finals
3	Australia	5	3	2	469	421	+48	8	
4	Georgia	5	2	3	379	407	−28	7	

Source: FIBA
Rules for classification: Tiebreakers

== Games ==
All times are local (UTC+9).

=== Germany vs. Georgia ===
This was the first game between Germany and Georgia at the World Cup. The Germans won in the group stage of EuroBasket 2017, which was the first and only competitive game between the two teams.

1 September 2023
17:30

Boxscore

Germany	100–73	Georgia
Scoring by quarter: 22–16, 21–25, 27–16, 30–16
Pts: Lô 18; Rebs: M. Wagner 6 Asts: Schröder 7		Pts: Mamukelashvili 19; Rebs: Bitadze 6 Asts: McFadden 7

Okinawa Arena, Okinawa City
Attendance: 5,852
Referees: Ademir Zurapović (BIH), Omar Bermúdez (MEX), Martin Horozov (BUL)

=== Slovenia vs. Australia ===
This was the third game between Slovenia and Australia in the World Cup. The Slovenians won the first two meetings in 2010 and 2014. The Australians won the bronze medal game of the 2020 Olympic tournament, which was the last competitive game between the two teams.

1 September 2023
21:10

Boxscore

Slovenia	91–80	Australia
Scoring by quarter: 28–18, 21–22, 17–22, 25–18
Pts: Dončić 20; Rebs: Tobey 12; Asts: Dončić 6		Pts: Giddey 25; Rebs: Giddey, Mills 8 Asts: Giddey 4

Okinawa Arena, Okinawa City
Attendance: 6,307
Referees: Matthew Kallio (CAN), Jorge Vázquez (PUR), Blanca Burns (USA)

=== Australia vs. Georgia ===
This was the first competitive game between Australia and Georgia.

3 September 2023
16:30

Boxscore

Australia	100–84	Georgia
Scoring by quarter: 23–17, 31–20, 25–30, 21–17
Pts: Mills 19; Rebs: Kay 9 Asts: Ingles 6		Pts: Bitadze 20; Rebs: Mamukelashvili 9 Asts: McFadden 9

Okinawa Arena, Okinawa City
Attendance: 6,126
Referees: Matthew Kallio (CAN), Blanca Burns (USA), Wojciech Liszka (POL)

=== Germany vs. Slovenia ===
This was the first game between Germany and Slovenia at the World Cup. Both teams had a 1–1 split in their head-to-head matchups in the second round of the 2023 FIBA Basketball World Cup European Qualifiers.

3 September 2023
20:10

Boxscore

Germany	100–71	Slovenia
Scoring by quarter: 11–25, 27–9, 30–18, 32–19
Pts: Schröder 24; Rebs: M. Wagner 8 Asts: Schröder 10		Pts: Dončić 23; Rebs: Dončić 6 Asts: Dončić 6

Okinawa Arena, Okinawa City
Attendance: 6,634
Referees: Ademir Zurapović (BIH), Jorge Vázquez (PUR), Omar Bermúdez (MEX)
