= EuroBasket 2025 final =

EuroBasket 2025 Final
- The Xiaomi Arena hosts the Final
- Event: EuroBasket 2025
Turkey	Germany
(Turkey)	(Germany)
83	88
	1	2	3	4	Total
Turkey	22	24	21	16	83
Germany	24	16	26	22	88
- Date: 14 September 2025
- Venue: Xiaomi Arena, Riga
- MVP: (Germany) Dennis Schröder
- Referees: Matthew Kallio (CAN); Ademir Zurapović (BIH); Yohan Rosso (FRA)
- Attendance: 11,000

The EuroBasket 2025 Final was the championship game of the EuroBasket 2025 tournament. The game took place on 14 September 2025 at the Xiaomi Arena in Riga, Latvia.

The game featured Turkey and Germany. Germany won the game 88–83 for their second EuroBasket title.

Before the final, both teams were undefeated during the tournament. Slovenia in 2017 were the latest undefeated champions. Germany, the current world champions, also had won the EuroBasket in 1993. In the other tournament they played in the final, Germany has lost to Greece in 2005. The other finalist, Turkey, reached the final of the 2001 European Basketball Championship held in their country, but had lost to Yugoslavia.

In the final, Germany took their second European Championship title, led by Dennis Schröder, who was named the tournament MVP. Isaac Bonga was the top scorer for Germany with 20 points and was named the Player of the Game. Turkey's Alperen Şengün was the top scorer of the game with 28 points.

== Road to the final ==
Turkey		Round	Germany	
Opponent	Result	Group phase	Opponent	Result
Latvia	93–73	Game 1	Montenegro	106–76
Czech Republic	92–78	Game 2	Sweden	105–83
Portugal	95–54	Game 3	Lithuania	107–88
Estonia	84–64	Game 4	Great Britain	120–57
Serbia	95–90	Game 5	Finland	91–61
Pos / Team / Pld / Pts; 1 / Turkey / 5 / 10; 2 / Serbia / 5 / 9; 3 / Latvia (H) / 5 / 8; 4 / Portugal / 5 / 7; 5 / Estonia / 5 / 6; 6 / Czech Republic / 5 / 5; Source: FIBA (H) Hosts			Pos / Team / Pld / Pts; 1 / Germany / 5 / 10; 2 / Lithuania / 5 / 9; 3 / Finland (H) / 5 / 8; 4 / Sweden / 5 / 6; 5 / Montenegro / 5 / 6; 6 / Great Britain / 5 / 6; Source: FIBA (H) Hosts	
Opponent	Result	Final phase	Opponent	Result
Sweden	85–79	Round of 16	Portugal	85–58
Poland	91–77	Quarterfinals	Slovenia	99–91
Greece	94–68	Semifinals	Finland	98–86

== Match details ==
14 September 2025
21:00

Boxscore

Turkey	83–88	Germany
Scoring by quarter: 22–24, 24–16, 21–26, 16–22
Pts: Şengün 28; Rebs: Larkin 6 Asts: Larkin 9		Pts: Bonga 20; Rebs: Wagner 8 Asts: Schröder 12

Xiaomi Arena, Riga
Attendance: 11,000
Referees: Matthew Kallio (CAN), Ademir Zurapović (BIH), Yohan Rosso (FRA)

Turkey	Germany

Starters:			Pts	Reb	Ast
G	0	Shane Larkin	13	6	9
G	2	Şehmus Hazer	2	1	0
SF	6	Cedi Osman	23	5	0
F/C	24	Ercan Osmani	2	4	3
C	23	Alperen Şengün	28	3	3
Reserves:					
SF	5	Sertaç Şanlı	DNP		
G/F	10	Onuralp Bitim	DNP		
G/F	22	Furkan Korkmaz	0	1	0
PF	30	Adem Bona	12	1	0
SF	33	Erkan Yılmaz	DNP		
PG	55	Kenan Sipahi	3	0	2
C	77	Ömer Yurtseven	0	2	0
Head coach:
(Turkish Basketball Federation) Ergin Ataman

2025 European champions

Germany
2nd title

Starters:			Pts	Reb	Ast
PG	17	Dennis Schröder	16	3	12
SG	42	Andreas Obst	9	2	2
G/F	9	Franz Wagner	18	8	2
F	0	Isaac Bonga	20	5	3
C	10	Daniel Theis	3	5	1
Reserves:					
PF	1	Oscar da Silva	0	0	1
PG	4	Maodo Lô	2	1	1
SF	5	Tristan da Silva	13	4	1
PG	21	Justus Hollatz	0	1	0
PF	32	Johannes Thiemann	7	3	1
C	34	Leon Kratzer	DNP		
Head coach:
(Basketball Australia) Alan Ibrahimagić

TCL Player of the Game
(Germany) Isaac Bonga

== Rosters ==
=== Turkey ===
A 16-player roster was announced on 2 July. On 18 August, Sarper David Mutaf was cut from the roster. The final roster was announced on 24 August, with Yiğitcan Saybir, Yiğit Arslan and Berk Uğurlu cut from the squad.

Turkey men's national basketball team – EuroBasket 2025 roster
Players
Coaches

Pos.	No.	Name	Age – Date of birth	Height	Club	Ctr.
PG	0	Shane Larkin (N)	32 – 2 October 1992	1.82 m (6 ft 0 in)	Anadolu Efes	(Turkey)
SG	2	Şehmus Hazer	26 – 15 February 1999	1.90 m (6 ft 3 in)	Anadolu Efes	(Turkey)
C	5	Sertaç Şanlı	34 – 5 August 1991	2.14 m (7 ft 0 in)	Fenerbahçe	(Turkey)
SF	6	Cedi Osman (C)	30 – 8 April 1995	2.00 m (6 ft 7 in)	Panathinaikos	(Greece)
SF	10	Onuralp Bitim	26 – 31 March 1999	1.96 m (6 ft 5 in)	Fenerbahçe	(Turkey)
SG	22	Furkan Korkmaz	28 – 24 July 1997	2.00 m (6 ft 7 in)	Bahçeşehir	(Turkey)
PF	23	Alperen Şengün	23 – 25 July 2002	2.06 m (6 ft 9 in)	Houston Rockets	(United States)
C	24	Ercan Osmani	27 – 4 April 1998	2.13 m (7 ft 0 in)	Anadolu Efes	(Turkey)
PF	30	Adem Bona	22 – 28 March 2003	2.06 m (6 ft 9 in)	Philadelphia 76ers	(United States)
SF	33	Erkan Yılmaz	27 – 3 December 1997	1.92 m (6 ft 4 in)	Anadolu Efes	(Turkey)
PG	55	Kenan Sipahi	30 – 26 May 1995	1.97 m (6 ft 6 in)	Bahçeşehir	(Turkey)
C	77	Ömer Yurtseven	27 – 19 June 1998	2.13 m (7 ft 0 in)	Panathinaikos	(Greece)

Head coach

- (Turkey) Ergin Ataman

Assistant coach(es)

- (Turkey) Ender Arslan
- (Turkey) Yakup Sekizkök

Legend

- (C) Team captain
- (N) Naturalised player
- Club – describes last
  club before the tournament
- Age – describes age
  on 27 August 2025

=== Germany ===
A 16-player roster was announced on 21 July. Tim Schneider and Christian Anderson Jr. were cut from the roster on 6 and 18 August, respectively. On 23 August, David Krämer withdrew due to muscle injury. A day later, the final roster was announced, with Nelson Weidemann being the final cut.

Germany men's national basketball team – EuroBasket 2025 roster
Players
Coaches

Pos.	No.	Name	Age – Date of birth	Height	Club	Ctr.
SF	0	Isaac Bonga	25 – 8 November 1999	2.03 m (6 ft 8 in)	Partizan	(Serbia)
PF	1	Oscar da Silva	26 – 21 September 1998	2.05 m (6 ft 9 in)	Bayern Munich	(Germany)
PG	4	Maodo Lô	32 – 31 December 1992	1.91 m (6 ft 3 in)	Žalgiris	(Lithuania)
SF	5	Tristan da Silva	24 – 15 May 2001	2.03 m (6 ft 8 in)	Orlando Magic	(United States)
C	7	Johannes Voigtmann	32 – 30 September 1992	2.11 m (6 ft 11 in)	Bayern Munich	(Germany)
G	9	Franz Wagner	24 – 27 August 2001	2.08 m (6 ft 10 in)	Orlando Magic	(United States)
PF	10	Daniel Theis	33 – 4 April 1992	2.03 m (6 ft 8 in)	AS Monaco	(France)
PG	17	Dennis Schröder (C)	31 – 15 September 1993	1.88 m (6 ft 2 in)	Sacramento Kings	(United States)
PG	21	Justus Hollatz	24 – 21 April 2001	1.95 m (6 ft 5 in)	Bayern Munich	(Germany)
PF	32	Johannes Thiemann	31 – 9 February 1994	2.05 m (6 ft 9 in)	Gunma Crane Thunders	(Japan)
C	34	Leon Kratzer	28 – 4 February 1997	2.12 m (6 ft 11 in)	Bayern Munich	(Germany)
SG	42	Andreas Obst	29 – 13 July 1996	1.91 m (6 ft 3 in)	Bayern Munich	(Germany)

Head coach

- (Spain) Álex Mumbrú

Assistant coach(es)

- (Australia) (Bosnia and Herzegovina) Alan Ibrahimagić
- (Spain) Alberto Miranda

Legend

- (C) Team captain
- (N) Naturalised player
- Club – describes last
  club before the tournament
- Age – describes age
  on 27 August 2025
