= EuroBasket 2025 Group B =

International basketball event

Group B of EuroBasket 2025 consisted of Finland, Germany, Great Britain, Lithuania, Montenegro, and Sweden. The games were played from 27 August to 3 September 2025 at the Nokia Arena in Tampere, Finland. The top four teams advanced to the knockout stage.

== Teams ==
Team	Qualification method	Date of qualification	App	First	Last	Streak	Best placement	World Ranking	
Team	Qualification method	Date of qualification	App	First	Last	Streak	Best placement	February 2025 (Note: The rankings of February 2025 were used for the final draw.)	August 2025
Germany	Group D top three	23 February 2025	26th	1951	2022	15	Champions (1993)	3	3
Finland	Host nation	29 March 2022	18th	1939	2022	6	Sixth place (1967)	20	20
Great Britain	Group F top three	21 February 2025	6th	2009	2022	3	13th place (2009, 2011, 2013)	48	48
Lithuania	Group H top two	24 November 2024	16th	1937	2022	14	Champions (1937, 1939, 2003)	10	10
Sweden	Group D top three	23 February 2025	11th	1953	2013	1	11th place (1995)	49	49
Montenegro	Group D top three	23 February 2025	5th	2011	2022	3	13th place (2017, 2022)	16	16

== Standings ==
Pos	Team	Pld	W	L	PF	PA	PD	Pts	Qualification
1	Germany	5	5	0	529	365	+164	10	Knockout stage
2	Lithuania	5	4	1	431	393	+38	9	Knockout stage
3	Finland (H)	5	3	2	426	406	+20	8	Knockout stage
4	Sweden	5	1	4	403	418	−15	6 (Note: Sweden 3 Pts, +13 PD; Montenegro 3 Pts, 0 PD; Great Britain 3 Pts, −13 PD)	Knockout stage
5	Montenegro	5	1	4	378	455	−77	6	
6	Great Britain	5	1	4	354	484	−130	6	

Source: FIBA
Rules for classification: 1) Points; 2) Head-to-head results; 3) Points difference; 4) Points scored.
(H) Hosts

== Matches ==
All times are local (UTC+3).

=== Great Britain vs Lithuania ===
27 August 2025
13:30

Boxscore

Great Britain	70–94	Lithuania
Scoring by quarter: 15–23, 18–18, 17–24, 20–29
Pts: Yeboah 17; Rebs: Akin 6 Asts: Nelson, Wheatle 4		Pts: Valančiūnas 18; Rebs: Valančiūnas 9 Asts: Jokubaitis, Velička 6

Nokia Arena, Tampere
Attendance: 4,243
Referees: Ademir Zurapović (BIH), Ariadna Chueca (ESP), Valentin Oliot (FRA)

=== Montenegro vs Germany ===
27 August 2025
16:30

Boxscore

Montenegro	76–106	Germany
Scoring by quarter: 20–24, 23–22, 12–33, 21–27
Pts: Vučević 23; Rebs: Vučević 10; Asts: Drobnjak 8		Pts: Wagner 22; Rebs: Wagner 8 Asts: Lô 6

Nokia Arena, Tampere
Attendance: 3,495
Referees: Luis Castillo (ESP), Michał Proc (POL), Nicolas Maestre (FRA)

=== Sweden vs Finland ===
27 August 2025
20:30

Boxscore

Sweden	90–93	Finland
Scoring by quarter: 21–26, 27–23, 24–23, 18–21
Pts: Håkanson 28; Rebs: Birgander 7 Asts: Gaddefors 6		Pts: Markkanen 28; Rebs: Markkanen 7 Asts: Salin 7

Nokia Arena, Tampere
Attendance: 11,865
Referees: Georgios Poursanidis (GRE), Boris Krejić (SLO), Martin Horozov (BUL)

=== Germany vs Sweden ===
29 August 2025
13:30

Boxscore

Germany	105–83	Sweden
Scoring by quarter: 27–17, 32–25, 25–24, 21–17
Pts: Schröder 23; Rebs: T. da Silva 6 Asts: Schröder 7		Pts: Pantzar 18; Rebs: Njie 6 Asts: Njie 7

Nokia Arena, Tampere
Attendance: 5,025
Referees: Ademir Zurapović (BIH), Michał Proc (POL), Ofer Manheim (ISR)

=== Lithuania vs Montenegro ===
29 August 2025
16:30

Boxscore

Lithuania	94–67	Montenegro
Scoring by quarter: 26–15, 21–13, 19–17, 28–22
Pts: Jokubaitis 21; Rebs: Blaževič 6 Asts: Jokubaitis 12		Pts: Vučević 20; Rebs: Vučević 10; Asts: Allman 6

Nokia Arena, Tampere
Attendance: 6,519
Referees: Luis Castillo (ESP), Ariadna Chueca (ESP), Georgios Poursanidis (GRE)

=== Finland vs Great Britain ===
29 August 2025
20:30

Boxscore

Finland	109–79	Great Britain
Scoring by quarter: 30–21, 28–21, 23–14, 28–23
Pts: Markkanen 43; Rebs: Nkamhoua 7 Asts: Madsen, Salin 5		Pts: Nelson 13; Rebs: Yeboah 8 Asts: Phillip 5

Nokia Arena, Tampere
Attendance: 12,900
Referees: Boris Krejić (SLO), Martin Horozov (BUL), Zdenko Tomašovič (SVK)

=== Lithuania vs Germany ===
30 August 2025
13:30

Boxscore

Lithuania	88–107	Germany
Scoring by quarter: 20–32, 27–23, 25–28, 16–24
Pts: Jokubaitis 20; Rebs: Tubelis 7 Asts: Sedekerskis 9		Pts: Schröder 26; Rebs: Wagner 7 Asts: Schröder 6

Nokia Arena, Tampere
Attendance: 10,047
Referees: Ademir Zurapović (BIH), Luis Castillo (ESP), Boris Krejić (SLO)

=== Great Britain vs Sweden ===
30 August 2025
16:30

Boxscore

Great Britain	59–78	Sweden
Scoring by quarter: 13–19, 17–16, 17–26, 12–17
Pts: Hesson 17; Rebs: Wheatle 13; Asts: Nelson 4		Pts: Larsson 23; Rebs: Pantzar 8 Asts: Birgander 6

Nokia Arena, Tampere
Attendance: 7,200
Referees: Georgios Poursanidis (GRE), Nicolas Maestre (FRA), Valentin Oliot (FRA)

=== Montenegro vs Finland ===
30 August 2025
20:30

Boxscore

Montenegro	65–85	Finland
Scoring by quarter: 23–23, 14–24, 15–20, 13–18
Pts: Slavković 15; Rebs: Vučević 12; Asts: Allman Jr., Simonović 5		Pts: Markkanen 26; Rebs: Markkanen 13; Asts: Maxhuni 6

Nokia Arena, Tampere
Attendance: 12,900
Referees: Ariadna Chueca (ESP), Martin Horozov (BUL), Michał Proc (POL)

=== Sweden vs Montenegro ===
1 September 2025
13:30

Boxscore

Sweden	81–87	Montenegro
Scoring by quarter: 15–18, 19–22, 31–24, 16–23
Pts: Larsson 28; Rebs: Birgander 10; Asts: Larsson, Njie 4		Pts: Vučević 23; Rebs: Vučević 15; Asts: Allman 7

Nokia Arena, Tampere
Attendance: 3,255
Referees: Georgios Poursanidis (GRE), Martin Horozov (BUL), Michał Proc (POL)

=== Germany vs Great Britain ===
1 September 2025
16:30

Boxscore

Germany	120–57	Great Britain
Scoring by quarter: 32–19, 26–12, 30–9, 32–17
Pts: T. da Silva 25; Rebs: Theis 9 Asts: Wagner 10		Pts: Hesson, Whelan 11; Rebs: Akin 6 Asts: Nelson 7

Nokia Arena, Tampere
Attendance: 3,760
Referees: Ariadna Chueca (ESP), Nicolas Maestre (FRA), Zdenko Tomašovič (SVK)

=== Finland vs Lithuania ===
1 September 2025
20:30

Boxscore

Finland	78–81	Lithuania
Scoring by quarter: 21–20, 15–25, 12–12, 30–24
Pts: Jantunen, Markkanen 19; Rebs: Markkanen 11; Asts: Markkanen 6		Pts: Jokubaitis 16; Rebs: Tubelis 11; Asts: Jokubaitis 9

Nokia Arena, Tampere
Attendance: 12,900
Referees: Ademir Zurapović (BIH), Luis Castillo (ESP), Boris Krejić (SLO)

=== Montenegro vs Great Britain ===
3 September 2025
13:30

Boxscore

Montenegro	83–89	Great Britain
Scoring by quarter: 26–25, 16–23, 21–20, 20–21
Pts: Vučević 31; Rebs: Vučević 11; Asts: Vučević 7		Pts: Hesson 25; Rebs: Wheatle 9 Asts: Nelson 8

Nokia Arena, Tampere
Attendance: 3,136
Referees: Ariadna Chueca (ESP), Georgios Poursanidis (GRE), Martin Horozov (BUL)

=== Lithuania vs Sweden ===
3 September 2025
16:30

Boxscore

Lithuania	74–71	Sweden
Scoring by quarter: 14–21, 19–18, 21–14, 20–18
Pts: Valančiūnas 18; Rebs: Tubelis 12; Asts: Velička 7		Pts: Larsson 18; Rebs: three players 5 Asts: Njie 6

Nokia Arena, Tampere
Attendance: 4,560
Referees: Nicolas Maestre (FRA), Valentin Oliot (FRA), Ofer Manheim (ISR)

=== Finland vs Germany ===
3 September 2025
20:30

Boxscore

Finland	61–91	Germany
Scoring by quarter: 19–21, 17–29, 13–19, 12–22
Pts: Nkamhoua 16; Rebs: Nkamhoua 11; Asts: Grandison, Little 3		Pts: Wagner 23; Rebs: three players 7 Asts: Schröder 9

Nokia Arena, Tampere
Attendance: 12,900
Referees: Ademir Zurapović (BIH), Boris Krejić (SLO), Luis Castillo (ESP)
