= Saibou =

Saibou is a surname. Notable people with the surname include:

- Ali Saibou (1940-2011), third President of Niger
- Joshiko Saibou (born 1990), German basketball player
