= 2020 FIBA Men's Olympic Qualifying Tournaments – Split =

2020 FIBA World Olympic Qualifying Tournament for Men
Split, Croatia

Tournament details
- Host country: Croatia
- Dates: 29 June – 4 July 2021
- Teams: 6
- Venue(s): 1 (in 1 host city)

Final positions
- Champions: Germany

Tournament statistics
- MVP: (Germany) Moritz Wagner
- Top scorer: (Mexico) Francisco Cruz (23.0)
- Top rebounds: (Mexico) Fabian Jaimes (8.7)
- Top assists: (Tunisia) Omar Abada (5.5)
- PPG (Team): Brazil (85.8)
- RPG (Team): Mexico (37.7)
- APG (Team): Brazil (22.3)

Official website
- WOQT Croatia

The 2020 FIBA Men's Olympic Qualifying Tournament in Split was one of four 2020 FIBA Men's Olympic Qualifying Tournaments. The tournament was held in Split, Croatia. It was originally scheduled to take place from 23 to 28 June 2020 but was postponed due to the COVID-19 pandemic, to 29 June to 4 July 2021.

Owing to doping violations, Russia is ineligible to compete in the 2020 Summer Olympics. Had Russia won the final, it would have competed under the acronym ROC.

== Teams ==
Team	Qualification	Date of qualification	FIBA World Ranking
Croatia	Wild card	19 September 2019	14th
Russia	12th at the 2019 FIBA Basketball World Cup	15 September 2019	9th
Brazil	13th at the 2019 FIBA Basketball World Cup	15 September 2019	11th
Germany	18th at the 2019 FIBA Basketball World Cup	15 September 2019	17th
Mexico	Wild card	19 September 2019	24th
Tunisia	20th at the 2019 FIBA Basketball World Cup	15 September 2019	34th

== Venue ==
Split	2020 FIBA Men's Olympic Qualifying Tournaments – Split (Croatia)
Spaladium Arena	2020 FIBA Men's Olympic Qualifying Tournaments – Split (Croatia)
Capacity: 10,941	2020 FIBA Men's Olympic Qualifying Tournaments – Split (Croatia)

== Preliminary round ==
All times are local (UTC+2).

=== Group A ===
Pos	Team	Pld	W	L	PF	PA	PD	Pts	Qualification
1	Germany	2	2	0	151	143	+8	4	Semi-finals
2	Mexico	2	1	1	148	146	+2	3	Semi-finals
3	Russia	2	0	2	131	141	−10	2	

Source: FIBA
Rules for classification: 1) points; 2) head-to-head points; 3) head-to-head points difference; 4) head-to-head number of points scored.

29 June 2021
16:30

Boxscore

Germany	82–76	Mexico
Scoring by quarter: 19–22, 21–20, 22–25, 20–9
Pts: Saibou 17; Rebs: Voigtmann 10; Asts: Voigtmann 5		Pts: Cruz 30; Rebs: Ayón 15; Asts: Cruz, Stoll 6

Spaladium Arena, Split
Attendance: 200
Referees: Matthew Kallio (CAN), Eddie Viator (FRA), Takaki Kato (JPN)

30 June 2021
16:30

Boxscore

Mexico	72–64	Russia
Scoring by quarter: 18–16, 13–20, 19–7, 22–21
Pts: Cruz 21; Rebs: Jaimes 9 Asts: Ayón 6		Pts: Antonov 13; Rebs: Vorontsevich 8 Asts: Vorontsevich 6

Spaladium Arena, Split
Attendance: 200
Referees: Jorge Vázquez (PUR), Eddie Viator (FRA), Rabah Noujaim (LIB)

1 July 2021
16:30

Boxscore

Russia	67–69	Germany
Scoring by quarter: 17–15, 18–17, 18–18, 14–19
Pts: Vorontsevich 17; Rebs: Antonov 8 Asts: Astapkovich 4		Pts: Voigtmann 13; Rebs: Voigtmann 7 Asts: Benzing, Saibou 3

Spaladium Arena, Split
Attendance: 200
Referees: Jorge Vázquez (PUR), Michael Weiland (CAN), Takaki Kato (JPN)

=== Group B ===
Pos	Team	Pld	W	L	PF	PA	PD	Pts	Qualification
1	Brazil	2	2	0	177	124	+53	4	Semi-finals
2	Croatia (H)	2	1	1	142	164	−22	3	Semi-finals
3	Tunisia	2	0	2	127	158	−31	2	

Source: FIBA
Rules for classification: 1) points; 2) head-to-head points; 3) head-to-head points difference; 4) head-to-head number of points scored.
(H) Hosts

29 June 2021
20:00

Boxscore

Tunisia	57–83	Brazil
Scoring by quarter: 21–21, 10–22, 15–21, 11–19
Pts: Marnaoui 13; Rebs: Mejri 7 Asts: Abada, El Mabrouk 4		Pts: Benite 15; Rebs: Varejão 8 Asts: Dos Santos 8

Spaladium Arena, Split
Attendance: 200
Referees: Ademir Zurapović (BIH), Jorge Vázquez (PUR), Michael Weiland (CAN)

30 June 2021
20:00

Boxscore

Brazil	94–67	Croatia
Scoring by quarter: 25–20, 20–14, 26–21, 23–12
Pts: Hettsheimeir 20; Rebs: Caboclo 8 Asts: Huertas 8		Pts: Bogdanović 16; Rebs: Bilan 7 Asts: Rogić, Ukić 4

Spaladium Arena, Split
Attendance: 1,470
Referees: Ademir Zurapović (BIH), Matthew Kallio (CAN), Michael Weiland (CAN)

1 July 2021
20:00

Boxscore

Croatia	75–70	Tunisia
Scoring by quarter: 20–11, 22–17, 14–29, 19–13
Pts: Hezonja 27; Rebs: Žižić 12; Asts: Hezonja 3		Pts: Slimane 15; Rebs: Slimane 7 Asts: Abada 7

Spaladium Arena, Split
Attendance: 754
Referees: Eddie Viator (FRA), Andrés Bartel (URU), Rabah Noujaim (LIB)

== Final round ==
Semi-finals
3 July
Germany	86
Croatia	76
3 July
Brazil	102
Mexico	74

Final
4 July
Germany	75
Brazil	64

=== Semi-finals ===
3 July 2021
12:30

Boxscore

Brazil	102–74	Mexico
Scoring by quarter: 24–18, 29–24, 27–15, 22–17
Pts: Benite 22; Rebs: three players 5 Asts: Dos Santos 6		Pts: Cruz 18; Rebs: Jaimes 8 Asts: Stoll 7

Spaladium Arena, Split
Attendance: 200
Referees: Ademir Zurapović (BIH), Eddie Viator (FRA), Takaki Kato (JPN)

3 July 2021
16:00

Boxscore

Germany	86–76	Croatia
Scoring by quarter: 19–23, 24–22, 13–18, 30–13
Pts: Lô 29; Rebs: Barthel 6 Asts: Lô 8		Pts: Bogdanović 38; Rebs: Hezonja, Žižić 6 Asts: Hezonja 3

Spaladium Arena, Split
Attendance: 1,482
Referees: Matthew Kallio (CAN), Jorge Vázquez (PUR), Michael Weiland (CAN)

=== Final ===
4 July 2021
19:30

Boxscore

Germany	75–64	Brazil
Scoring by quarter: 14–17, 22–17, 16–12, 23–18
Pts: Wagner 28; Rebs: Voigtmann 11; Asts: Lô 5		Pts: Varejão 14; Rebs: Benite, Caboclo 5 Asts: Benite, Huertas 3

Spaladium Arena, Split
Attendance: 200
Referees: Ademir Zurapović (BIH), Matthew Kallio (CAN), Michael Weiland (CAN)

== Final ranking ==
#	Team	W–L	Qualification
1	Germany	4–0	Qualified for the Olympics
2	Brazil	3–1	
3	Mexico	1–2	
4	Croatia	1–2	
5	Russia	0–2	
6	Tunisia	0–2	
