= Robin Benzing =

German basketball player (born 1989)

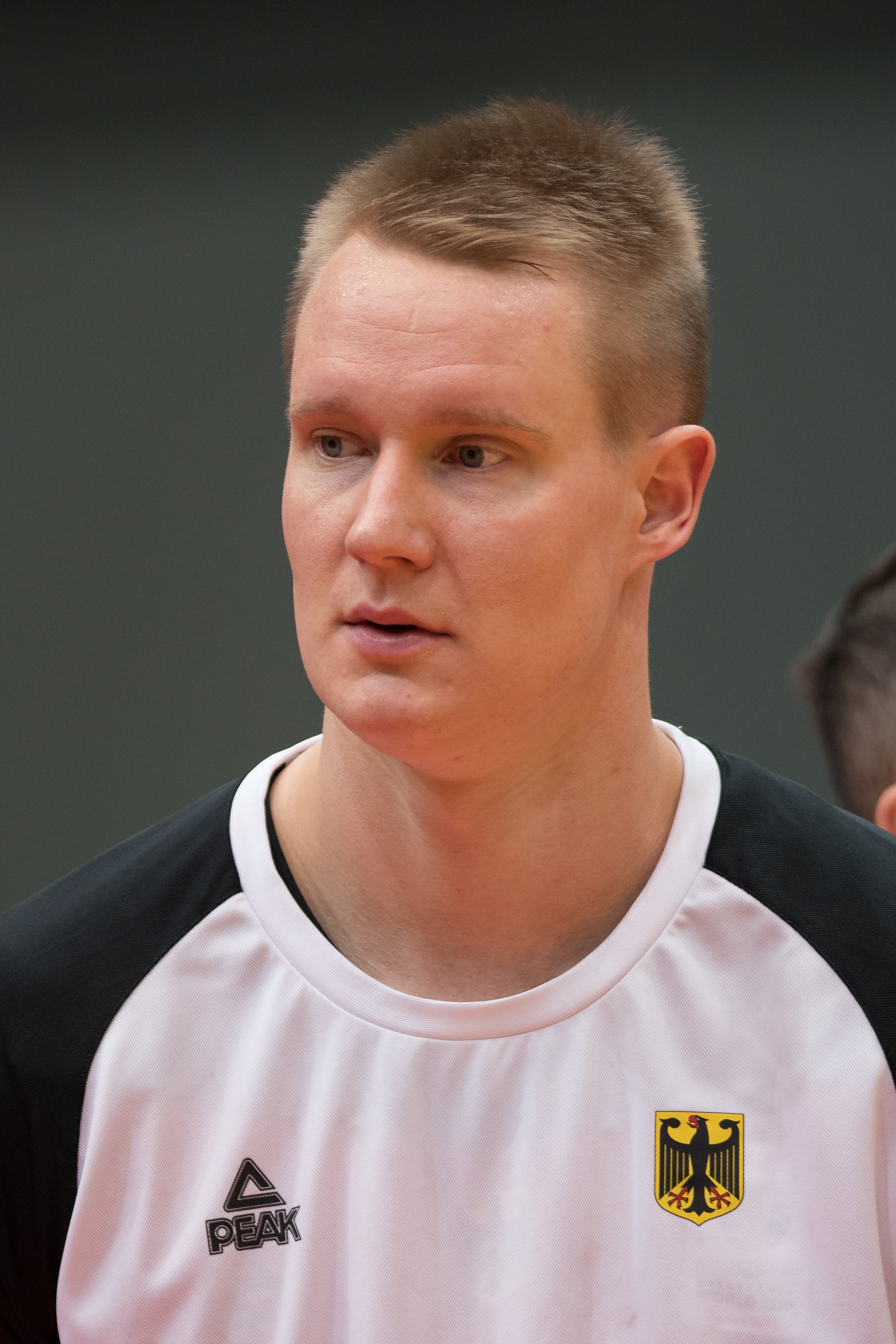
- Benzing with Germany in 2017

No. 12 – Gießen 46ers
- Position: Power forward
- League: ProA

Personal information
- Born: 1 May 1989 (age 37) Seeheim-Jugenheim, West Germany
- Listed height: 2.10 m (6 ft 11 in)
- Listed weight: 108 kg (238 lb)

Career information
- NBA draft: 2011: undrafted
- Playing career: 2005–present

Career history
- 2005–2008: TV Langen
- 2009–2011: ratiopharm Ulm
- 2011–2015: Bayern Munich
- 2015–2017: Zaragoza
- 2017–2018: S.Oliver Würzburg
- 2018–2019: Beşiktaş
- 2019–2021: Zaragoza
- 2021–2022: Fortitudo Bologna
- 2022–2023: Peñarol
- 2023–present: Giessen 46ers

Career highlights
- Bundesliga champion (2014); 6× BBL All-Star (2010–2014, 2018); 2x All-Bundesliga First Team (2010, 2018); All-Bundesliga Second Team (2011); Bundesliga Most Effective Player (2018)

Robin Clemens Benzing (born 25 January 1989) is a German professional basketball player for Giessen 46ers of the ProA. He is also a member of the Germany national basketball team. Standing at 2.10 m (6 ft 10 1/2 in), he plays at the power forward position.

== Professional career ==
Benzing played in Germany with TV Langen in the second-tier TV Langen until 2009. In 2008, he had signed a letter of intent with the University of Michigan, but eventually did not join the Wolverines due to NCAA initial eligibility requirements.

From 2009 to 2011, Benzing played for Ratiopharm Ulm in Germany's Basketball Bundesliga, followed by a four-year stint at Bayern Munich. On 30 June 2015 he signed a two-year deal with CAI Zaragoza of the Spanish Liga ACB. After two years playing in Spain, he returned to his home country in September 2017, signing a three-year contract with S.Oliver Würzburg. Benzing averaged 17.2 points and 4.1 rebounds per game in the 2017-18 season. On 4 September he signed a one-month deal with Beşiktaş, with an option for nine additional months.

On 27 July 2019 he signed a one-year deal with Casademont Zaragoza of the Liga ACB. Benzing re-signed with the team on 11 June 2020.

On 10 August 2021 Benzig signed with Fortitudo Bologna in the Italian Lega Basket Serie A.

In November 2022, Benzing joined Peñarol of the Liga Uruguaya de Básquetbol (LUB).

For the 2023/24 season, Benzing returned to Germany to join the Giessen 46ers in the German ProA.

== German national team ==
Benzing has been a member of the German national under-18 and German national under-20 teams. He played in the 2007 FIBA Europe Under-18 Championship and the 2009 FIBA Europe Under-20 Championship, where he was the tournament's leading scorer with 22.2 points per game. In 2009, he made his debut for the senior Germany national basketball team in the EuroBasket 2009. He also played the EuroBasket 2011, 2013, 2015, 2017 and the 2010 FIBA World Championship.

In 2021, Benzing helped his national team to qualify for the 2020 Summer Olympics (which were postponed due to the COVID-19 pandemic). He scored 13 points in the qualifying tournament's final, in a 75-64 victory against Brazil.

== Career statistics ==
Legend
GP	Games played	GS	Games started	MPG	Minutes per game
FG%	Field-goal percentage	3P%	3-point field-goal percentage	FT%	Free-throw percentage
RPG	Rebounds per game	APG	Assists per game	SPG	Steals per game
BPG	Blocks per game	PPG	Points per game	PIR	Performance index rating
**Bold**	Career high

=== EuroLeague ===
Year	Team	GP	GS	MPG	FG%	3P%	FT%	RPG	APG	SPG	BPG	PPG	PIR
2013–14	Bayern Munich	**24**	**15**	16.1	.427	.352	**.872**	1.8	.6	.6	.1	6.4	4.5
2014–15	Bayern Munich	8	8	**21.9**	**.431**	**.381**	.786	**2.6**	**.9**	**.8**	**.4**	**7.9**	**7.8**
Career		32	23	17.6	.429	.360	.849	2.0	.7	.6	.2	6.8	5.3
