= Myles Hesson =

British basketball player (born 1990)

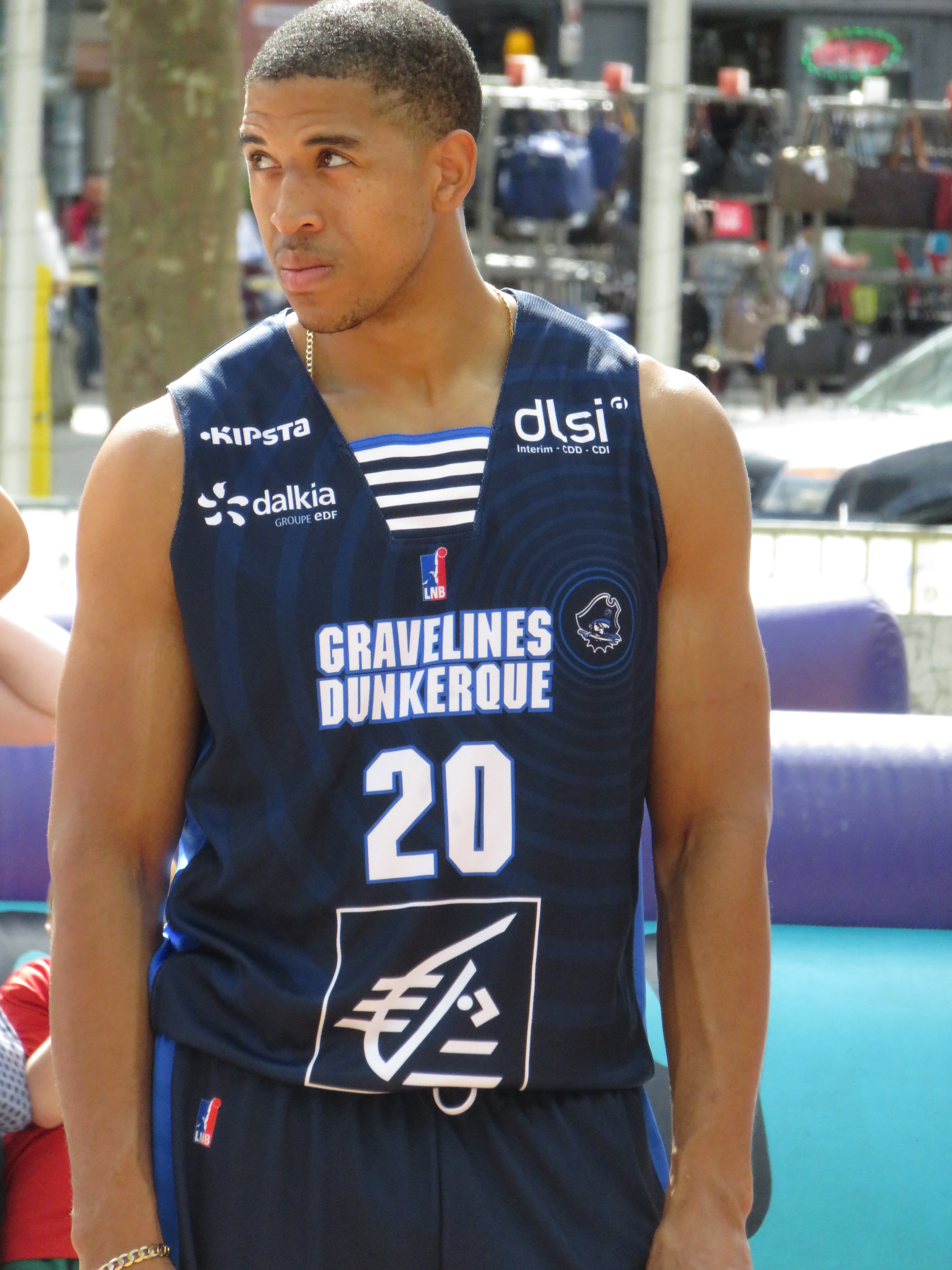
- Hesson with BCM Gravelines in 2016

Personal information
- Born: 5 June 1990 (age 36) Birmingham, England
- Listed height: 6 ft 6 in (1.98 m)
- Listed weight: 101 kg (223 lb)

Career information
- NBA draft: 2012: undrafted
- Playing career: 2010–present
- Position: Small forward
- Number: 22

Career history
- 2010–2011: Essex Pirates
- 2011–2012: Mersey Tigers
- 2012–2013: Weißenhorn Youngstars
- 2013: Ulm
- 2013–2014: Gießen 46ers
- 2014–2015: Eisbären Bremerhaven
- 2015–2016: JDA Dijon
- 2016–2017: Gravelines-Dunkerque
- 2017–2018: Nanterre 92
- 2018–2019: Gravelines-Dunkerque
- 2019–2021: Élan Chalon
- 2021–2022: Saga Ballooners
- 2022–2023: Kagawa Five Arrows
- 2023–2024: Toyama Grouses
- 2024: Fuerza Regia de Monterrey
- 2024–2025: Neptūnas Klaipėda
- 2025–2026: Mykonos

Career highlights
- B.League scoring champion (2023)

Myles Edward Sinclair Hesson (born 5 June 1990) is a British professional basketball player.

== Playing career ==
Hesson came through the youth ranks of the City of Birmingham Basketball Club and played for the Birmingham Aces in the EBL2 before joining British Basketball League side Essex Pirates in 2010. After a standout year at Liverpool Mersey Tigers (2011–12) in which he averaged 15.1 points as well as 7.7 boards a contest in BBL play, he took his game to Germany, joining the Weißenhorn Youngstars of the 2. Bundesliga ProB, the third tier of German basketball. Dominating the league and averaging a double-double of points and rebounds, Hesson was picked up by Ratiopharm Ulm of Germany's top-flight Bundesliga in March 2013, where he completed the 2012–2013 campaign.

Hesson spent the 2013–14 season with the Gießen 46ers in the German 2. Bundesliga ProA, the country's second highest league. He wrapped up the season by earning eurobasket.com All-German 2.Bundesliga Pro A Forward of the Year honors. That landed him a contract with German Bundesliga outfit Eisbären Bremerhaven. He appeared in 32 Bundesliga games for the Eisbären squad during the 2014–15 season, averaging 12.2 points, 4.3 rebounds and 1.9 assists per outing.

In 2015–16, Hesson suited up for JDA Dijon Bourgogne of the French top-flight LNB Pro A, scoring 10.9 points a contest, while grabbing 3.5 rebounds per game. After one year at the club, he signed with fellow LNB ProA club BCM Gravelines-Dunkerque. He made 19 ProA appearances for Gravelines-Dunkerque in 2016–17, producing 12.4 points and 5.1 rebounds a contest. In late May 2017, Hesson signed a deal with another ProA club, Nanterre 92. However, the move collapsed due to a failed medical. In December 2017, he finally joined the Nanterre team. In early February 2018, Hesson had a leg stress fracture, the same injury which kept him out of action in the early stages of the season . After one year at Gravelines-Dunkerque, he signed with another French Pro A side, Élan Chalon, in November 2019.

He joined the Saga Ballooners of Japan's B2 League for the 2021–22 campaign. In 42 games for the team, Hesson averaged 21.1 points and 10 rebounds. He moved to the Kagawa Five Arrows for the 2022–23 season. Later in the season, Hesson joined the Toyama Grouses, making his debut on 8 March 2023. He closed out the 2022–23 season with league-leading 22.9 points per game.

On 22 December 2024, Hesson signed with Neptūnas Klaipėda of the Lithuanian Basketball League (LKL) for the remainder of the 2024–25 season.

On 29 September 2025, Hesson signed with Mykonos of the Greek Basketball League until the end of the season.

== National team career ==
Hesson was a member of Great Britain's U20 team at the 2009 and 2010 European Championship (Division B) and won his first cap for the British men's national team in 2012. He averaged 11.8 points and 6.0 boards a contest at the 2013 European Championships. At the 2022 Commonwealth Games in his hometown of Birmingham, Hesson won the 3x3 competition as part of the England team, sinking the gold-winning shot in overtime.
