= Miro Little =

Finnish basketball player (born 2004)

No. 1 – UC Santa Barbara Gauchos
- Position: Point guard
- League: Big West Conference

Personal information
- Born: 30 May 2004 (age 22) Tampere, Finland
- Listed height: 1.91 m (6 ft 3 in)
- Listed weight: 84 kg (185 lb)

Career information
- High school: Helsinki Basketball Academy (Helsinki, Finland); Sunrise Christian Academy (Bel Aire, Kansas)
- College: Baylor (2023–2024); Utah (2024–2025); UC Santa Barbara (2025–present)
- Playing career: 2019–present

Career history
- 2019–2022: HBA-Märsky

Miro Little (born 30 May 2004) is a Finnish college basketball player who plays for UC Santa Barbara Gauchos in Big West Conference. He previously played for the Utah Utes and the Baylor Bears. Little also represents the Finland national team.

== Early career ==
Little started to play basketball in a youth team of his hometown club Tampereen Pyrintö. He joined Helsinki Basketball Academy in 2019 and played with HBA-Märsky in Finnish second tier Koripallon I-divisioona. In 2022, he played at the Adidas Next Generation tournament with HBA in Patras, Greece, averaging 23.0 points, 8.2 rebounds and 4.2 assists over four games. Later in the same year, he moved to United States to attend Sunrise Christian Academy high school. In February 2023, Little was invited to the Basketball Without Borders camp, and in April 2023, he was invited to the Nike Hoop Summit event.

== College career ==
Little started his college career in 2023 and joined Baylor for the 2023–24 season. He had committed to Baylor already a one-year before over several other offers. In his freshman year, Little had a minor role in the team and his playing minutes were limited, and eventually in the end of April 2024, he registered to the NCAA transfer portal.

On 7 May 2024, it was announced that Little would join the Utah Utes.

In April 2025, it was announced that Little would join UC Santa Barbara in Big West Conference.

== National team career ==
=== Youth ===
Little played for Finland U16 at the 2019 FIBA U16B European Championship tournament. He played also for Finland U18 at the 2022 FIBA U18B European Championships, where Finland finished 3rd and were promoted to Division A.

=== Senior ===
Little debuted in Finland senior national team on 25 February 2022 aged 17, in a 2023 FIBA World Cup qualifying win against Slovenia. He was the first Finnish underaged player in 25 years to make a debut at the senior international level, after Teemu Rannikko.

Little was named in the Finland squad for the EuroBasket 2022, and for the 2023 FIBA Basketball World Cup. He also played in the 2024 FIBA Olympic qualifying tournament in Valencia, Spain, averaging 7 points, 3.3 rebounds and 3.7 assists in three games against Bahamas, Poland and Spain.

Little played for Finland at the EuroBasket 2025, where they historically reached the semi-finals and finished 4th in the tournament. Little led Finland with 4.6 assists per game.

== Career statistics ==
Legend
| GP | Games played | GS | Games started | MPG | Minutes per game |
| FG% | Field goal percentage | 3P% | 3-point field goal percentage | FT% | Free throw percentage |
| RPG | Rebounds per game | APG | Assists per game | SPG | Steals per game |
| BPG | Blocks per game | PPG | Points per game | **Bold** | Career high |

=== College ===
| Year | Team | GP | GS | MPG | FG% | 3P% | FT% | RPG | APG | SPG | BPG | PPG |
|---|---|---|---|---|---|---|---|---|---|---|---|---|
| 2023–24 | Baylor | **34** | 0 | 7.1 | .429 | **.360** | .722 | 1.2 | .7 | .1 | – | 1.7 |
| 2024–25 | Utah | 33 | 12 | 17.7 | .337 | .310 | .755 | 3.2 | 2.9 | .9 | .2 | 5.3 |
| 2025–26 | UCSB | 18 | **18** | **28.6** | **.460** | .344 | **.829** | **5.4** | **4.6** | **1.3** | **.4** | **11.9** |
| Career | | 85 | 30 | 15.8 | .397 | .329 | .792 | 2.9 | 2.4 | .7 | .1 | 5.3 |

=== National team ===
| Team | Tournament | Pos. | GP | PPG | RPG | APG |
|---|---|---|---|---|---|---|
| Finland | EuroBasket 2022 | 7th | 7 | 2.4 | 0.9 | 2.1 |
| Finland | 2023 FIBA World Cup | 21st | 5 | 5.0 | 1.8 | 4.6 |
| Finland | EuroBasket 2025 | 4th | 9 | 5.4 | 2.8 | 4.6 |

== Personal life ==
Little was born in Tampere, Finland, and raised in Pirkkala, to a Finnish basketball player Kati Packalén and an American basketball player La Trice Little. His father played basketball in Finland, and later worked as a basketball referee in Finnish Korisliiga. His mother Kati Packalén was named the CEO of the Basketball Association of Finland in September 2022. His older sister Niia Little is also a basketball player.

At the age of six, Little was diagnosed with type 1 diabetes.
