= Okinawa Arena =

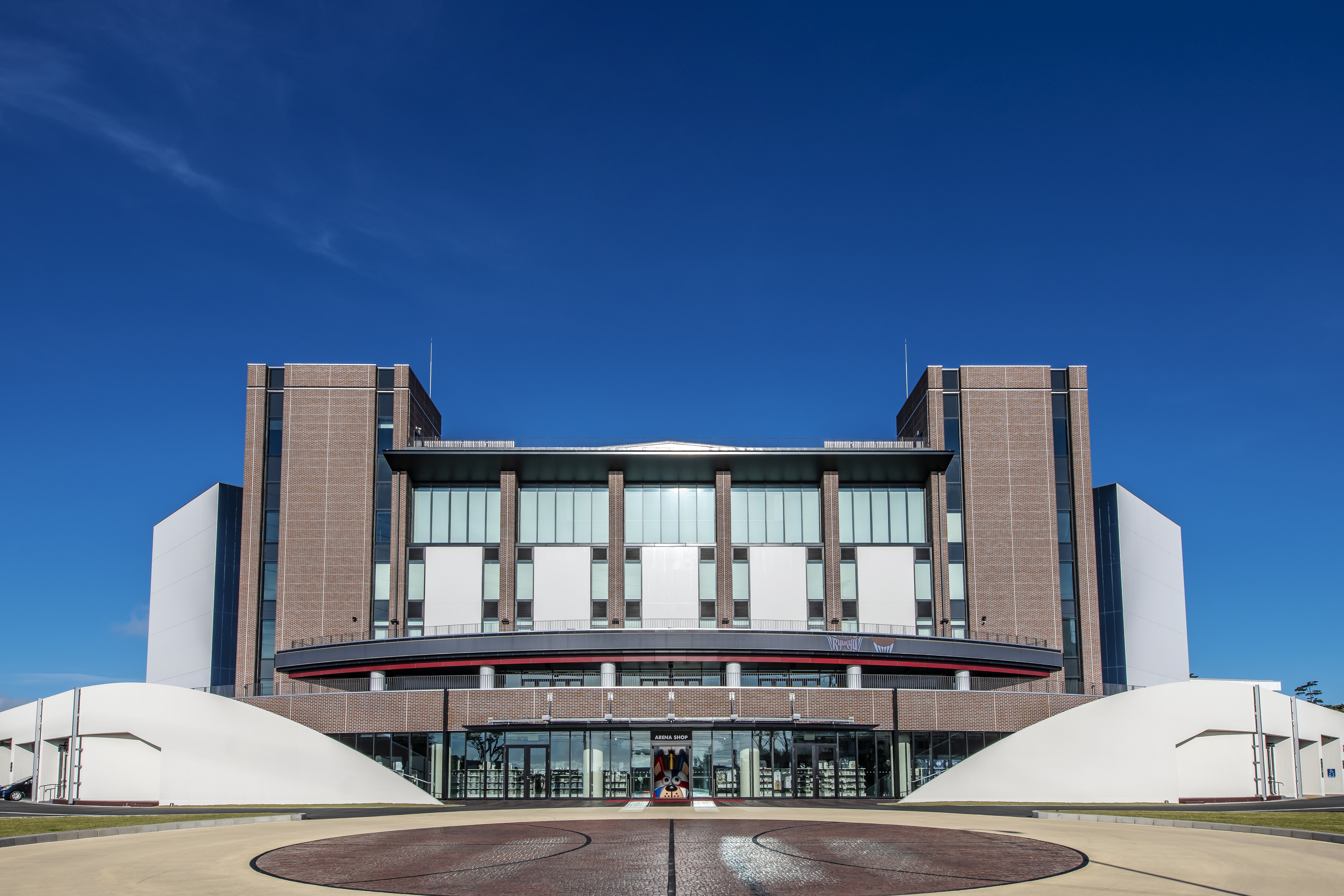

- Location within Okinawa Prefecture Location within Japan
- Full name: Okinawa City Multi-Purpose Arena
- Location: Okinawa, Japan
- Coordinates: 26°19′58″N 127°47′01″E
- Capacity: 10,000
- Scoreboard: 510-inch display

Tenant
- Ryukyu Golden Kings (B.League) (2020–present)
- Building details

General information
- Status: Completed
- Groundbreaking: September 25, 2018
- Estimated completion: March 2021
- Cost: ¥17 billion

Technical details
- Floor count: 6
- Floor area: 26,200 m^{2} (282,000 sq ft)

Website
- www.okinawa-arena.jp

The Okinawa Arena, also provisionally known as the Okinawa City Multi-Purpose Arena or Okinawa Suntory Arena, is an indoor arena in Okinawa, Japan. It was opened in 2021 and is one of the venues of the 2023 FIBA Basketball World Cup.

== Background ==
Plans to build the Okinawa Arena were made as early as 2015. In 2016, it was announced that the sports venue will be built over the site occupied by the Okinawa City bullfighting ring next to the Koza Sports Park. Sachiyo Kuwae, the city mayor, unveiled the master plan for the 10,000-person-capacity multipurpose arena on 12 July 2016. The facility will have five stories above ground and will have a parking area for 1,000 vehicles.

The Okinawa Arena will have a total area of 26,200 m^{2} (282,000 sq ft). Its estimated total cost, including its parking facilities, is 17 billion yen.

Demolition of the bullfighting ring was planned to commence in 2017 and was followed by the construction of the arena building itself. The groundbreaking ceremony took place on September 25, 2018 and is planned to open by September 2020.

== Use ==
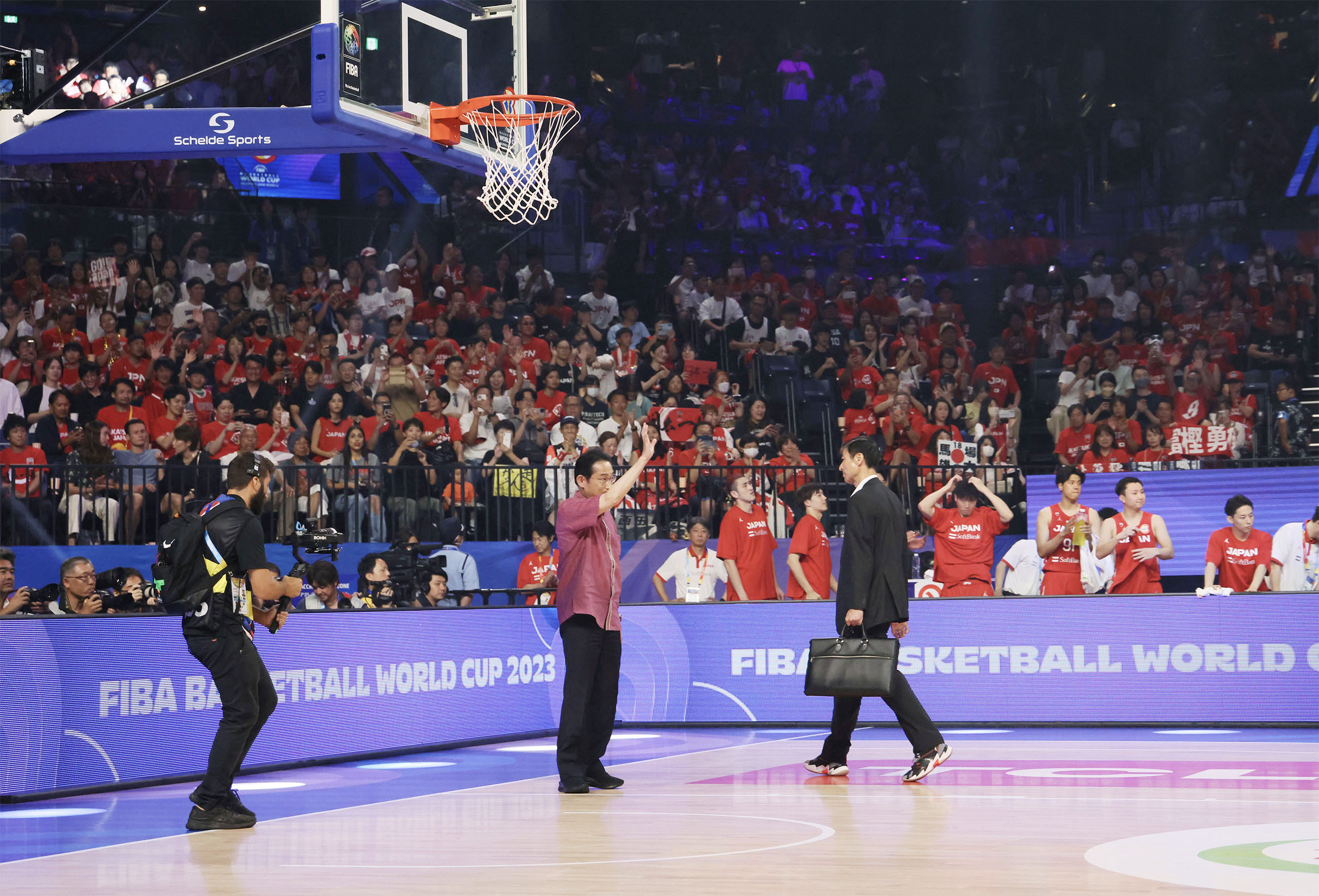
Interior during the 2023 FIBA Basketball World Cup

The Okinawa Arena is the home venue of the Ryukyu Golden Kings professional basketball team and is also set to host major events in Okinawa City.

It is Japan's sole venue in the 2023 FIBA Basketball World Cup, which it co-hosts with the Philippines and Indonesia.

== See also ==
- List of indoor arenas in Japan
