= Olivier Nkamhoua =

Finnish basketball player (born 2000)

- Nkamhoua with Barcelona in 2026

No. 13 – FC Barcelona
- Position: Power forward
- League: Liga ACB; EuroLeague

Personal information
- Born: 2 May 2000 (age 26) Helsinki, Finland
- Listed height: 2.08 m (6 ft 10 in)
- Listed weight: 101 kg (223 lb)

Career information
- High school: Helsinki Basketball Academy (Helsinki, Finland); Richard Montgomery (Rockville, Maryland); Bishop Walsh School (Cumberland, Maryland)
- College: Tennessee (2019–2023); Michigan (2023–2024)
- NBA draft: 2024: undrafted
- Playing career: 2016–present

Career history
- 2016–2017: NMKY Helsinki
- 2024–2025: Niners Chemnitz
- 2025–2026: Varese
- 2026–present: Barcelona

Olivier Robinson, "Olli", Nkamhoua (born 2 May 2000) is a Finnish professional basketball player for Barcelona of the Liga ACB and the EuroLeague. He played college basketball for the Tennessee Volunteers and Michigan Wolverines. Nkamhoua is also part of the Finland national team. He began playing basketball with NMKY Helsinki.

== Early life ==
Nkamhoua was born in Helsinki to Finnish mother and Cameroonian-born father, Christian Nkamhoua, who played basketball in Finland until 2006. Nkamhoua is also of Scottish descent on his mother's side. He was raised in Kumpula and Käpylä neighbourhoods in Helsinki. When aged 17, Nkamhoua joined Helsinki Basketball Academy but was not named in the HBA-Märsky team's squad. Later he moved to the United States with his father to play basketball in high school. Before his departure, he had debuted at senior level with NMKY Helsinki in the Finnish second tier in the 2016–17 season.

== High school career ==
In the United States, he played and studied in Richard Montgomery High School and Bishop Walsh School in Maryland. While playing for Bishop Walsh Spartans, Nkamhoua was named the Player of the Year in 2019, and attended the Alhambra Catholic Invitational Tournament (ACIT) with the Spartans. Nkamhoua was named in the All-ACIT First Team and was the Appalachian Mountain Athletic Conference selection.

== College career ==
=== Tennessee ===
Nkamhoua began his college basketball career at Tennessee in 2019, where he appeared in 112 games, with 58 starts, and averaged 6.5 points and 3.8 rebounds. During the 2021–22 season, he averaged 8.6 points and 5.6 rebounds as a junior before suffering a season-ending left ankle injury at South Carolina in February 2022.

On 19 March 2023, in a March Madness game against Duke, Nkamhoua recorded 27 points on 77% shooting on the field and grabbed five rebounds, helping Tennessee to get a 65–52 win. During the 2022–23 season, he averaged 10.8 points and 5.0 rebounds in his senior year. On 30 March 2023, Nkamhoua entered the NCAA transfer portal. In May 2023, Nkamhoua was named in the roster of NBA G League Elite Camp, a camp for future draft prospects.

=== Michigan ===
On 7 June 2023, Nkamhoua announced he would transfer to Michigan. On 21 February 2024, Michigan head coach Juwan Howard announced that Nkamhoua would miss the remainder of the season after undergoing surgery on his left wrist. During the 2023–24 season, he started 26 games for Michigan, averaging career bests in points (14.8), rebounds (7.1) and assists (2.7). He also set single-season bests for three-point field goals (27), rebounds (185) and minutes played (33.4). Throughout his collegiate career, Nkamhoua played in 138 games with 84 consecutive starts. He scored 1,117 points, grabbed 612 rebounds while adding 183 assists with 89 blocks and 52 steals.

== Professional career ==
=== Niners Chemnitz ===
On 3 July 2024, Nkamhoua started his professional career after signing with Niners Chemnitz of the Basketball Bundesliga and the FIBA Champions League.

Two days after the signing, Nkamhoua was named in the roster of the Portland Trail Blazers for the 2024 NBA Summer League. He played in two games, averaging 6.5 points, 4 rebounds and 3 blocks in 14 minutes playing time.

After the Summer League, Nkamhoua returned to Chemnitz. On 2 October, in a Champions League game against Derthona, Nkahmoua recorded his career best 19 points and six rebounds for Chemnitz. On 20 October, he recorded his new career-high 21 points in an 81–78 win against ALBA Berlin in Bundesliga.

=== Pallacanestro Varese ===
On 28 June 2025, Nkamhoua joined Pallacanestro Varese in Italian Lega Basket Serie A (LBA), becoming the third Finnish player in Varese, after Teemu Rannikko and Antero Lehto.

On 10 July, Nkamhoua was announced on the Portland Trail Blazers roster for the 2025 NBA Summer League.

On 5 October, Nkamhoua made his Varese debut, recording 28 points as the top scorer in a 105–102 away win against Dinamo Sassari in LBA.

=== FC Barcelona ===
On 12 July 2026, Nkamhoua signed with FC Barcelona of the Liga ACB and the EuroLeague on a two-season deal.

== International career ==
Nkamhoua has played 20 games for Finland's U16 youth national team.

Nkamhoua has been part of Finland senior national team since 2021. He was forced to miss the EuroBasket 2022 due to his commitment to Tennessee, but next year he represented Finland at the 2023 FIBA World Cup in his first major international tournament. He also played in the 2024 FIBA Olympic qualifying tournament, averaging 9.3 points, 3.3 rebounds and 1.7 assists in three games against Bahamas, Poland and Spain, where Finland reached the semi-finals.

He played for Finland at the EuroBasket 2025, where they reached the semi-finals for the first time in the country's history, and eventually finished 4th in the tournament. Nkamhoua averaged 10.8 points and was the team's third-best scorer.

== Career statistics ==
Legend
GP	Games played	GS	Games started	MPG	Minutes per game
FG%	Field goal percentage	3P%	3-point field goal percentage	FT%	Free throw percentage
RPG	Rebounds per game	APG	Assists per game	SPG	Steals per game
BPG	Blocks per game	PPG	Points per game	**Bold**	Career high

=== FIBA Champions League ===
Year	Team	GP	GS	MPG	FG%	3P%	FT%	RPG	APG	SPG	BPG	PPG
2024–25	Niners Chemnitz	8	8	23.6	.623	.476	.632	4.8	1.4	.9	1.4	14.8

=== Domestic leagues ===
Year	Team	League	GP	MPG	FG%	3P%	FT%	RPG	APG	SPG	BPG	PPG
2016–17	(Finland) NMKY Helsinki	I-divisioona	9	10.6	.478	.000	.500	2.6	.3	.2	.1	2.8
2024–25	(Germany) Niners Chemnitz	BBL	32	21.0	.460	.337	.731	5.0	1.0	.7	.9	10.4
2025–26	(Italy) Varese	LBA	29	30.7	.507	.350	.683	5.5	1.9	.8	.9	16.0

=== College ===
Year	Team	GP	GS	MPG	FG%	3P%	FT%	RPG	APG	SPG	BPG	PPG
2019–20	Tennessee	30	0	11.4	.557	.200	.613	3.0	.3	.1	.5	3.3
2020–21	Tennessee	24	0	7.1	**.565**	–	.444	1.3	.2	.3	.3	2.3
2021–22	Tennessee	22	22	21.5	.497	**.448**	**.722**	5.6	1.2	.5	**1.1**	8.6
2022–23	Tennessee	**36**	**36**	25.3	.513	.333	.699	5.0	2.0	.4	.6	10.8
2023–24	Michigan	26	26	**33.5**	.512	.333	.671	**7.1**	**2.7**	**.6**	.6	**14.8**
Career		138	84	19.4	.523	.368	.681	4.3	1.2	.4	.6	8.0

=== National team ===
Team	Tournament	Pos.	GP	PPG	RPG	APG
Finland	2023 FIBA World Cup	21st	5	8.0	3.8	2.0
Finland	EuroBasket 2025	4th	9	10.8	5.3	2.9
