= Joshiko Saibou =

German basketball player (born 1990)

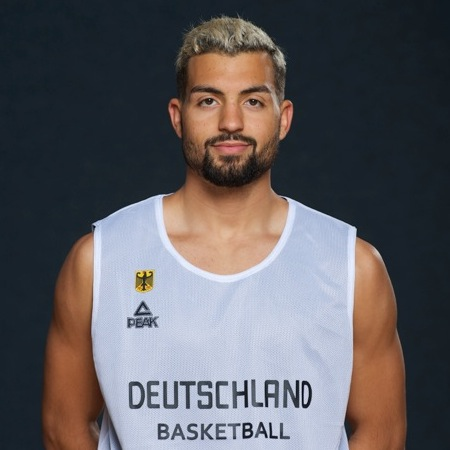
- Saibou in a Germany training jersey in 2014.

No. 1 – Stade Rochelais Basket
- Position: Point guard
- League: Élite 2

Personal information
- Born: 7 March 1990 (age 36) Cologne, West Germany
- Listed height: 188 cm (6 ft 2 in)

Career information
- Playing career: 2009–present

Career history
- 2009–2011: Alba Berlin
- 2011–2013: TBB Trier
- 2013–2014: Gießen 46ers
- 2014–2015: Crailsheim Merlins
- 2015–2016: s.Oliver Baskets
- 2016–2017: Gießen 46ers
- 2017–2019: Alba Berlin
- 2019–2020: Telekom Baskets Bonn
- 2021: Champagne Châlons-Reims Basket
- 2021–2022: JDA Dijon
- 2023–2024: Medipolis SC Jena
- 2024–present: Stade Rochelais Basket

Joshiko Saibou (born 7 March 1990) is a German professional basketball player for Stade Rochelais Basket of the Élite 2. Saibou usually plays as point guard. He is of Togolese descent.

== Early career ==
Saibou started in 2007 with the youth team of Alba Berlin in the NBBL under head coach Henrik Rödl, along with other players including Niels Giffey, Andreas Seiferth and Konstantin Klein.

== Professional career ==
Saibou started his career in 2009 with the professional team of Alba Berlin. In 2011, Saibou signed a two-year contract with Henrik Rödl's TBB Trier.

In 2016, Saibou signed with the Gießen 46ers. On 2 June 2017, he left Gießen to play for his former club Alba Berlin.

On 10 July 2019, he has signed with Telekom Baskets Bonn of the Basketball Bundesliga (BBL).

On 4 August 2020, he was fired by the Bonn team, due to misconduct in the Corona crisis. In February 2021, he signed with French club Champagne Châlons-Reims Basket.

On 17 July 2021, he has signed a two-year deal with JDA Dijon of the French LNB Pro A. JDA Dijon also plays in the Basketball Champions League

In September 2023, Saibou returned to Germany to join Medipolis SC Jena in the German ProA.

On November 19, 2024, he signed with Stade Rochelais Basket of the Pro A.

== International career ==
In November 2017, Saibou was selected for the German national basketball team for the first time. He played with Germany at the 2020 Summer Olympics in Tokyo.
