= Justus Hollatz =

German basketball player (born 2001)

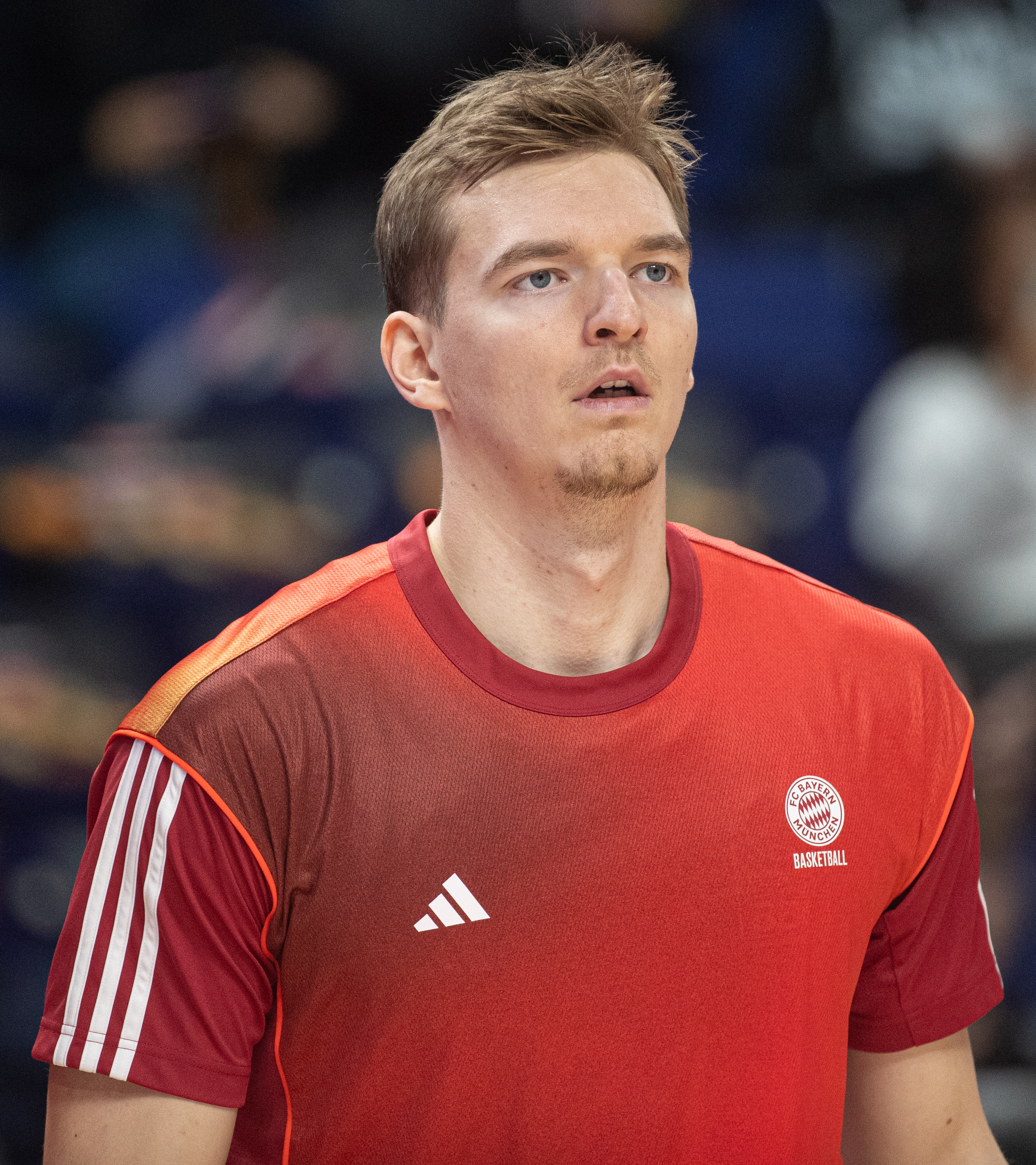
- Hollatz with Bayern Munich in 2025

No. 21 – Bayern Munich
- Position: Point guard
- League: BBL; EuroLeague

Personal information
- Born: 21 April 2001 (age 25) Hamburg, Germany
- Listed height: 1.91 m (6 ft 3 in)
- Listed weight: 77 kg (170 lb)

Career information
- Playing career: 2015–present

Career history
- 2015–2017: BG Harburg Hittfeld
- 2017–2018: Rist Wedel
- 2018–2022: Hamburg Towers
- 2020–2021: →Rist Wedel
- 2022–2023: Breogán
- 2023–2025: Anadolu Efes
- 2025–present: Bayern Munich

Career highlights
- Bundesliga champion (2025); Liga ACB All-Young Players Team (2023); 2× Bundesliga Best German Young Player (2021, 2022)
Medals
Men's basketball
Representing Germany
FIBA World Cup
Gold medal – first place	2023 Philippines–Japan–Indonesia
EuroBasket
Gold medal – first place	2025 Cyprus–Finland–Poland–Latvia
Bronze medal – third place	2022 Czech Republic–Georgia–Italy–Germany

Justus Hollatz (born 21 April 2001) is a German professional basketball player for Bayern Munich of the German Basketball Bundesliga (BBL) and the EuroLeague. He plays the point guard position.

== Early life ==
Hollatz was born on 21 April 2001, in the Langenbek district of Hamburg. His basketball journey began through a working group at the Marmstorf elementary school, where he played with his two older brothers Joshua and Jacob on the youth team of BG Harburg Hittfeld. He also played football, and auditioned for the youth team of FC St. Pauli. However, the club was far from his parents' home, which prevented him from taking the opportunity to move to St. Pauli. Since he preferred basketball, Hollatz ultimately gave up football.

== Professional career ==
In November 2015, Hollatz made his debut with the youth team of Harburg Hittfeld. Prior to the 2017–18 season, Hollatz moved to club SC Rist Wedel.

For the 2018–19 season, Hollatz transferred to his hometown club Hamburg Towers, where he eventually helped lift them to a title. After the championship winning season, Hollatz signed a three-year contract with Hamburg in May 2019.

Three years later, Hollatz moved to Spanish club Breogán, for the 2022–23 season. During his lone season with the team he averaged 7.9 points, 2.1 rebounds and 3.3 assists per game. In June 2023, Hollatz signed with Cedevita Olimpija for the 2023–24 season. However, he was loaned for the season to Anadolu Efes.

In January 2025, following his stint with Anadolu Efes, Hollatz signed a three-year contract with German club Bayern Munich.

== National team career ==
In February 2021, Hollatz made his debut with the senior Germany national team, in a EuroBasket 2022 qualifier against Great Britain. In September 2022, Hollatz was one of the members who helped Germany win bronze at EuroBasket 2022, where he averaged 1.3 points and 2.8 assists per game. The following year, Hollatz helped Germany win the 2023 FIBA World Cup, averaging 2 points and 1 assist per game during the competition.

== Career statistics ==
Legend
GP	Games played	GS	Games started	MPG	Minutes per game
FG%	Field-goal percentage	3P%	3-point field-goal percentage	FT%	Free-throw percentage
RPG	Rebounds per game	APG	Assists per game	SPG	Steals per game
BPG	Blocks per game	PPG	Points per game	PIR	Performance index rating
**Bold**	Career high

=== EuroLeague ===
Year	Team	GP	GS	MPG	FG%	3P%	FT%	RPG	APG	SPG	BPG	PPG	PIR
2023–24	Anadolu Efes	24	11	10.4	.415	.227	.833	1.2	1.3	.4	.0	2.3	2.7
Career		24	11	10.4	.415	.227	.833	1.2	1.3	.4	.0	2.3	2.7

=== EuroCup ===
Year	Team	GP	GS	MPG	FG%	3P%	FT%	RPG	APG	SPG	BPG	PPG	PIR
2021–22	Hamburg Towers	13	8	20.2	.455	.481	.650	2.1	4.2	1.3	.1	8.2	7.8
Career		13	8	20.2	.455	.481	.650	2.1	4.2	1.3	.1	8.2	7.8

=== Domestic leagues ===
Year	Team	League	GP	MPG	FG%	3P%	FT%	RPG	APG	SPG	BPG	PPG
2017–18	(Germany) Rist Wedel	ProB	14	10.5	.400	.313	.500	1.2	1.0	.6	.1	2.1
2018–19	(Germany) Rist Wedel	ProB	17	26.4	.308	.167	.727	4.1	4.5	2.5	.5	5.8
2018–19	(Germany) Hamburg Towers	ProA	24	11.6	.460	.355	.500	1.3	1.9	.8	.2	3.1
2019–20	(Germany) Rist Wedel	ProB	16	30.7	.477	.260	.676	5.9	4.5	2.6	.1	14.3
2019–20	(Germany) Hamburg Towers	BBL	18	16.1	.375	.130	.667	1.2	2.2	1.6	.2	2.7
2020–21	(Germany) Rist Wedel	ProB	3	22.3	.517	.417	.615	3.0	5.0	3.0	—	14.3
2020–21	(Germany) Hamburg Towers	BBL	36	21.5	.386	.273	.551	2.4	2.9	.9	.1	5.8
2021–22	(Germany) Hamburg Towers	BBL	33	23.1	.439	.305	.737	2.2	5.6	1.4	.1	7.7
2022–23	(Spain) Breogán	ACB	34	24.1	.442	.322	.706	2.1	3.3	1.3	.2	7.9
2023–24	(Turkey) Anadolu Efes	TBSL	13	22.0	.444	.343	.842	2.5	3.0	.8	.1	7.1
