= Matthew Kallio =

Canadian basketball referee

Personal information
- Born: September 26, 1986 (age 40) Edmonton, Alberta, Canada

Matthew Leigh "Matt" Kallio (Edmonton, 26 September 1986) is a Canadian NBA and FIBA referee, who has been a licensed FIBA official since 2012.

In 2021–22, he made his NBA debut as a non-staff referee and officiated 10 regular-season NBA games. He was promoted to full-time NBA officiating staff ahead of the 2022–23 season, becoming the first international official at the NBA level.

== Early life and education ==
Kallio was born in Edmonton, Alberta, with Finnish ancestry. He attended M.E. LaZerte High School before graduating from the University of Alberta in 2008.

== Officiating career ==
=== Canada (College / University) ===
Before entering the professional and international officiating ranks, Kallio accumulated extensive experience in Canadian collegiate basketball. He spent multiple years officiating in the Canadian Colleges Athletic Association (CCAA) and in U Sports.

=== FIBA ===
Kallio obtained his FIBA referee licence in 2012 and has served on FIBA tournaments since then. He was assigned to the 2019 FIBA Basketball World Cup in China. He was also selected as one of the FIBA referees for the Tokyo 2020 Olympic Basketball Tournament.

In September 2025, he officiated the gold medal game of EuroBasket 2025 between Germany and Turkey in Riga.

=== NBA / WNBA / NBA G League ===
Kallio refereed in the NBA G League for multiple seasons and also worked in the WNBA prior to joining the NBA full-time. During the 2021–22 NBA season he officiated as a non-staff official before being promoted to the NBA officiating staff for the 2022–23 season.

== Notable assignments ==
- First Canadian to officiate an NBA regular-season game as a referee in January 2021.
- Assigned to the Tokyo 2020 Olympics (held in 2021).
- Named on FIBA's Long List of referees and selected for Olympic assignments for Paris 2024, and officiated games in the Paris 2024 tournament.
- Assigned as referee for the EuroBasket 2025, and also was the head referee in the EuroBasket 2025 semifinal game, Greece vs. Turkey (held in September 2025).
