= Ademir Zurapović =

Bosnian basketball referee (born 1972)

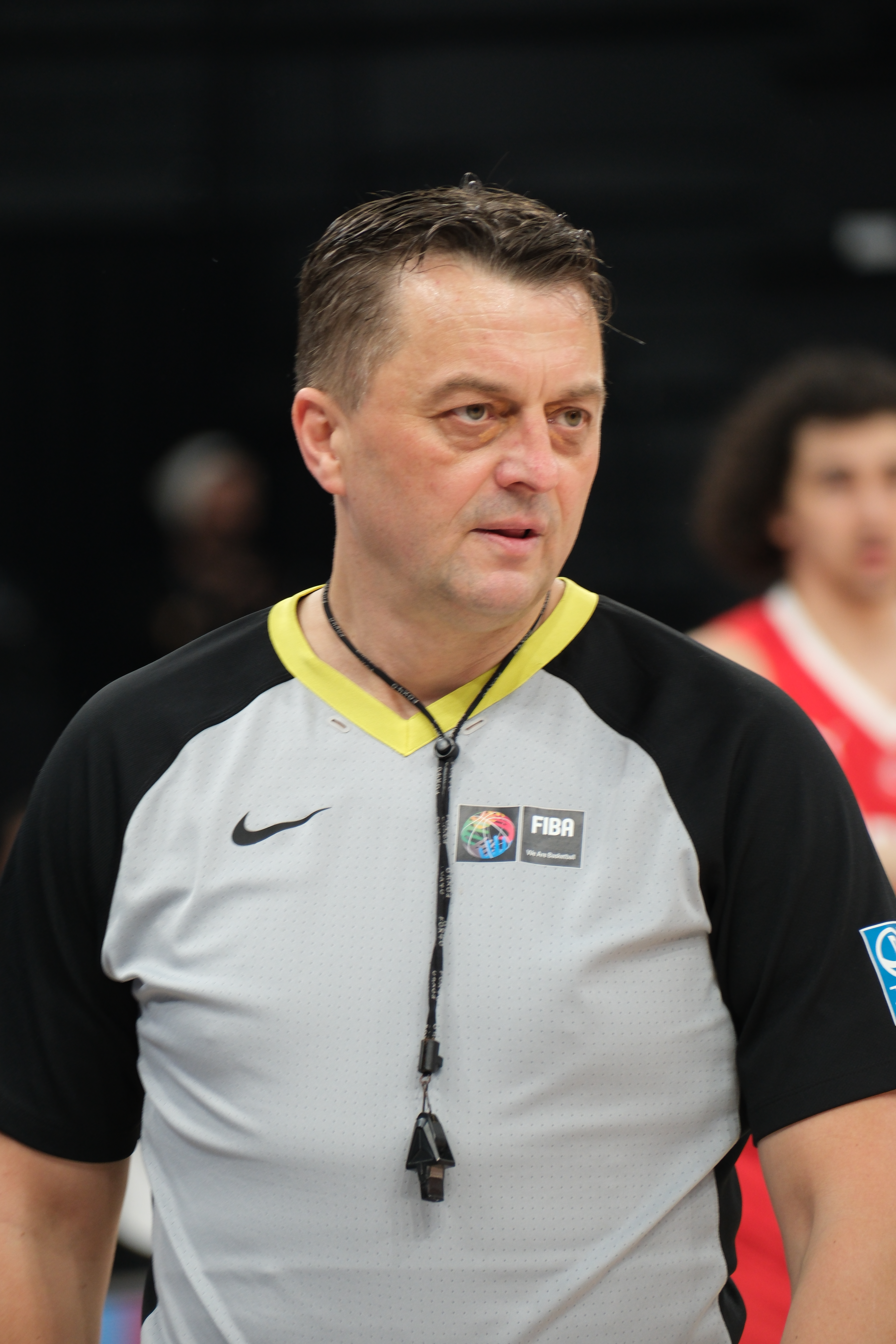
- Zurapović in 2025

Personal information
- Born: May 20, 1972 (age 54) Tuzla, Bosnia and Herzegovina

Ademir Zurapović (Tuzla, Bosnia and Herzegovina, 20 May 1972) is a Bosnian international basketball referee and a FIBA-licensed official since 1995, who is widely considered as one of the most experienced European referees.

He has officiated at the highest levels of the game, including the Olympic Games, FIBA World Cup, EuroBasket, and major European club competitions.

== Career ==
Zurapović began his refereeing career in the late 1980s and became a FIBA referee in 1995.

He officiated in the EuroLeague (2005–2007) and the EuroCup (until 2009). He later became a regular referee in the Basketball Champions League (BCL), including appointments at the BCL Final Four and other BCL final events.

Zurapović officiated at the 2019 FIBA Basketball World Cup and the 2023 FIBA Basketball World Cup. During the 2023 World Cup he refereed matches including Japan vs Finland in Okinawa. He refereed the FIBA Intercontinental Cup final in Buenos Aires (2021). He also officiated at Basketball Champions League Final Four events.

Zurapović has been a regular official at European Championships, including assignments at EuroBasket 2022 and selection among elite referees for EuroBasket 2025.

Zurapović was selected as a referee for the basketball tournament at the Tokyo 2020 Olympic Games. He was also named among the referees for the Paris 2024 Olympic Games. In September 2025, he officiated the gold medal game of EuroBasket 2025 between Germany and Turkey in Tallinn.
