= 2019 FIBA Basketball World Cup =

International basketball competition

2019年国际篮联篮球世界杯 2019 Nián Guójì Lánlián Lánqiú Shìjièbēi

Tournament details
- Host country: China
- Dates: 31 August – 15 September
- Officially opened by: Xi Jinping
- Teams: 32 (from 5 confederations)
- Venue: 8 (in 8 host cities)

Final positions
- Champions: Spain (2nd title)
- Runners-up: Argentina
- Third place: France
- Fourth place: Australia

Tournament statistics
- Games played: 92
- Attendance: 794,951 (8,641 per game)
- MVP: (Spain) Ricky Rubio
- Top scorer: (South Korea) Ra Gun-ah (23.0 points per game) (Serbia) Bogdan Bogdanović (183 total points)

The 2019 FIBA Basketball World Cup was the 18th tournament of the FIBA Basketball World Cup for men's national basketball teams, held from 31 August to 15 September 2019. The tournament was hosted in China and was rescheduled from 2018 to 2019, becoming the first since 1967 that did not occur in the same year as the FIFA World Cup (which was held the previous year). The tournament expanded from 24 to 32 teams.

The tournament also served as qualification for the 2020 Summer Olympics, which took the top two teams from each of the Americas and Europe, and the top team from each of Africa, Asia and Oceania, alongside the tournament's host Japan. Montenegro and the Czech Republic each made their first appearance as independent nations after previously being part of Serbia and Montenegro and Czechoslovakia respectively, while Poland marked its return to the FIBA Basketball World Cup for the first time since 1967.

The defending champions, the United States, experienced their worst result at a World Cup, losing to France in the quarter-finals and Serbia in the subsequent classification game. The United States' previous worst result was sixth place in 2002. This was the first World Cup at which all three of the historically most successful teams (United States, Serbia/Yugoslavia and Russia/Soviet Union) failed to reach the semi-finals. Asian powerhouse and hosts China failed to get out of the first round, losing in shocking upsets to Poland and Venezuela. China ultimately missed the Asian qualifying spot for Tokyo, the first time in the country's history they did not qualify directly for the Olympics.

Spain captured their second title after beating Argentina in the final 95–75. It was the second time Spain had reached a World Cup final, and its second win, while for Argentina it would prove to be its second defeat in three attempts. France went on to win the bronze medal for the second consecutive time after defeating Australia 67–59.

== Hosts selection ==
The whole bidding process started in April 2014. Bids from numerous nations were submitted. On 16 March 2015, it was confirmed that the World Cup would be staged in Asia, with China and Philippines as the final countries to be the basis for the selection of the host. On 7 August 2015, it was announced that China won the bid against the Philippines and will host the upcoming World Cup.

=== Voting results ===
2019 FIBA Basketball World Cup bidding results
| Nation | Votes |
|---|---|
| China | 14 |
| Philippines | 7 |

== Venues ==
Host venues in China
| Beijing | 2019 FIBA Basketball World Cup is located in China | Nanjing |
|---|---|---|
| Wukesong Arena | 2019 FIBA Basketball World Cup is located in China | Nanjing Youth Olympic Sports Park Gymnasium |
| Capacity: 17,173 | 2019 FIBA Basketball World Cup is located in China | Capacity: 19,610 |
| Shanghai | 2019 FIBA Basketball World Cup is located in China | Wuhan |
| Shanghai Oriental Sports Center | 2019 FIBA Basketball World Cup is located in China | Wuhan Sports Center Gymnasium |
| Capacity: 18,000 | 2019 FIBA Basketball World Cup is located in China | Capacity: 11,700 |
Venues within Guangdong area
| Dongguan | 2019 FIBA Basketball World Cup is located in Guangdong | Foshan |
| Dongguan Basketball Center | 2019 FIBA Basketball World Cup is located in Guangdong | Foshan International Sports & Cultural Arena |
| Capacity: 16,133 | 2019 FIBA Basketball World Cup is located in Guangdong | Capacity: 15,028 |
| Guangzhou | 2019 FIBA Basketball World Cup is located in Guangdong | Shenzhen |
| Guangzhou Gymnasium | 2019 FIBA Basketball World Cup is located in Guangdong | Shenzhen Bay Sports Centre |
| Capacity: 11,468 | 2019 FIBA Basketball World Cup is located in Guangdong | Capacity: 12,381 |

== Qualification ==
Teams qualified Teams failed to qualify Teams withdrew Teams did not enter

China as the hosts automatically qualified for the tournament. The continental championships were no longer the qualification system for the World Cup. Instead, two rounds of continental qualifying tournaments were held over two years.

The first round of the Americas, Asia/Oceania and Africa qualifiers featured 16 teams each, whereas Europe had 32 teams. Division A teams were split in groups of four, to be held in a home-and-away round-robin. The top three teams in each groups advanced to round two, and the last placed teams played the best Division B teams to qualify for the next season's Division A.

In round two of the World Cup qualifiers, teams were split in groups of six, totalling four groups in Europe and two in the other qualifiers. Teams carried over the points from round one, and faced other three teams again in a home-and-away round-robin. The best teams in each group qualified for the World Cup.

Starting 2019, no wild card selection was held, and the Olympic champions were not guaranteed a spot in the tournament.

The draw for the qualifiers was held on 7 May 2017 in Guangzhou.

Montenegro and the Czech Republic debuted in the World Cup. Montenegro was formerly a part of Yugoslavia, and later, Serbia and Montenegro teams, while the Czech Republic was a part of the old Czechoslovakia. Poland was returning to the World Cup, after participating in 1967. Canada, China, Germany, Ivory Coast, Russia, and Tunisia were returning to the World Cup after missing out in 2014. Croatia, Egypt, Finland, Mexico, Slovenia, and Ukraine were the teams that participated in 2014 that did not qualify in 2019. Brazil and the United States qualified in 2019, continuing their streaks in participating in all World Cups.

=== Qualified teams ===
Africa (5)

- Angola
- Ivory Coast
- Nigeria
- Senegal
- Tunisia

Americas (7)

- Argentina
- Brazil
- Canada
- Dominican Republic
- Puerto Rico
- United States
- Venezuela

Asia and Oceania (8)

- Australia
- China (host)
- Iran
- Japan
- Jordan
- New Zealand
- Philippines
- South Korea

Europe (12)

- Czech Republic (debut)
- France
- Germany
- Greece
- Italy
- Lithuania
- Montenegro (debut)
- Poland
- Russia
- Serbia
- Spain
- Turkey

== Squads ==
Each team had a final roster of 12 players; a team can opt to have one naturalized player as per FIBA eligibility rules from its roster.

== Referees ==
The following referees were selected for the tournament.

- Gentian Cici (ALB)
- Juan Fernández (ARG)
- Leandro Lezcano^{1} (ARG)
- Leandro Zalazar (ARG)
- Scott Beker (AUS)
- James Boyer (AUS)
- Ademir Zurapović (BIH)
- Guilherme Locatelli (BRA)
- Cristiano Maranho (BRA)
- Martin Horozov (BUL)
- Arnaud Kom Njilo (CMR)
- Matthew Kallio (CAN)
- Michael Weiland (CAN)
- Felipe Ibarra (CHI)
- Duan Zhu (CHN)
- Ye Nan (CHN)
- Yu Jung (TPE)
- Carlos Peralta (ECU)
- Yohan Rosso (FRA)
- Carsten Straube (GER)
- Georgios Poursanidis (GRE)
- Harja Jaladri (INA)
- Ahmed Al-Shuwaili (IRQ)
- Saverio Lanzarini (ITA)
- Manuel Mazzoni (ITA)
- Tolga Şahin (ITA)
- Takaki Kato (JPN)
- Yevgeniy Mikheyev (KAZ)
- Andris Aunkrogers (LAT)
- Mārtiņš Kozlovskis (LAT)
- Omar Bermúdez (MEX)
- Krishna Domínguez (MEX)
- Ahmed Abaakil (MAR)
- Kingsley Ojeaburu (NGR)
- Julio Anaya (PAN)
- Ferdinand Pascual (PHI)
- Wojciech Liszka (POL)
- Michał Proc (POL)
- Alexis Mercado (PUR)
- Jorge Vázquez (PUR)
- Roberto Vázquez (PUR)
- Aleksandar Glišić (SRB)
- Zdenko Tomašovič (SVK)
- Boris Krejič (SLO)
- Luis Castillo (ESP)
- Antonio Conde^{1} (ESP)
- Hwang In-tae (KOR)
- Kim Jong-kuk (KOR)
- Markos Michaelides (SUI)
- Nicolas Fernandes (TAH)
- Yener Yılmaz (TUR)
- Sergiy Zashchuk (UKR)
- Steven Anderson (USA)
- Matthew Myers (USA)
- Andrés Bartel (URU)
- Daniel García^{1} (VEN)

^{1} – Suspended after the match France vs. Lithuania.

== Preparation games ==
Several teams participated in official tournaments or in exhibition ones, either ad hoc or already existing ones, to prepare for the World Cup.

=== Pan American Games ===
An official and traditional tournament in the Americas. Out of the eight teams from the tournament, five already qualified to the World Cup. Of these five, all except the United States had players expected to be in the World Cup rosters, with the USA playing with collegiate players. Argentina defeated Puerto Rico to win the gold medal.

=== Acropolis International Basketball Tournament ===
An exhibition tournament. All four participating teams used the Acropolis Tournament as a warm-up. Serbia topped the table to win the championship, ahead of Greece.

=== Austiger Cup ===
An exhibition tournament. The four teams played in this tournament hosted by China as a warm-up to the World Cup. Serbia topped the table to win the championship, ahead of France.

=== Málaga Tournament ===
An exhibition tournament. Four teams participated in a preparation tournament hosted in Málaga, Spain. It was contested by Spain, Democratic Republic of the Congo, Ivory Coast, and the Philippines.

=== Other games ===
Exhibition games were held as warm-ups for the World Cup. The United States defeated Spain in the Honda Center in Anaheim, which was between the top two teams in the FIBA World Rankings. Australia's defeat of the United States in Marvel Stadium, Melbourne in the 2019 Australian International Basketball series was the first USA team's loss with NBA players since its 2006 FIBA World Championship semifinals loss to Greece. The USA is the second-youngest team in the tournament and features only two players with international experience. Notably the US is missing over 30 of their best players, who opted out either due to injury, or to prepare for the NBA season.

== Format ==
The tournament was played in three stages. During the first stage, the 32 qualified teams were sorted into eight groups of four (A-H) and each team in a group played the other three teams once. The top two teams from each group then advanced to the second group stage. In the second group stage, there were four groups of four (I-L) made up of the teams that advanced from the first round, with the teams that have not yet played each other facing off against one another once. The top two teams from groups I to L will qualify for the final knockout phase.

Classification rounds were revived after they were not held in 2014. They were traditionally held in every World Championship/World Cup and were last seen in action in 2010.

In total, 92 games were played over a total of 16 days.

== Draw ==
The draw took place on 16 March 2019 at Shenzhen Cultural Center in Shenzhen.

Hosts China and the three best qualified teams as per the February 2019 FIBA World Rankings were seeded in Pot 1, and China and USA were assigned to groups A and E, respectively. The remaining 28 teams were allocated Pots 2-8 based on the 2019 FIBA World Ranking. Teams in pots 1, 4, 5 and 8 were drawn into Groups A, C, E and G, and Teams in pots 2, 3, 6 and 7 were drawn into Groups B, D, F and H.

Aside from Europe, two teams from the same qualification zone could not be drawn into the same group. Canada was moved from Pot 5 to Pot 6, switching places with Iran (the best ranked team from that pot) to avoid having two teams from the Americas in the same group.

FIBA Basketball World Cup 2019 Global Ambassadors Kobe Bryant and Yao Ming, American singer and songwriter Jason Derulo, and Chinese idol singer Yang Chaoyue led the draw ceremony.

After the draw, Group H, which includes Australia, Canada, Lithuania, and Senegal, was described as the "group of death".

=== Groups A, C, E, and G ===
| Pot 1 | Pot 4 | Pot 5 | Pot 8 |
|---|---|---|---|
| China (29) (host)(Group A); United States (1) (Group E); Spain (2); France (3) | Puerto Rico (16); Turkey (17); Dominican Rep. (18); Venezuela (20) | Germany (22); Czech Republic (24); Poland (25); Iran (27) | Japan (48); Jordan (49); Tunisia (51); Ivory Coast (64) |

=== Groups B, D, F, and H ===
| Pot 2 | Pot 3 | Pot 6 | Pot 7 |
|---|---|---|---|
| Serbia (4); Argentina (5); Lithuania (6); Greece (8) | Russia (10); Australia (11); Brazil (12); Italy (13) | Canada (23); Montenegro (28); Philippines (31); South Korea (32) | Nigeria (33); Senegal (37); New Zealand (38); Angola (39) |

== Preliminary round ==
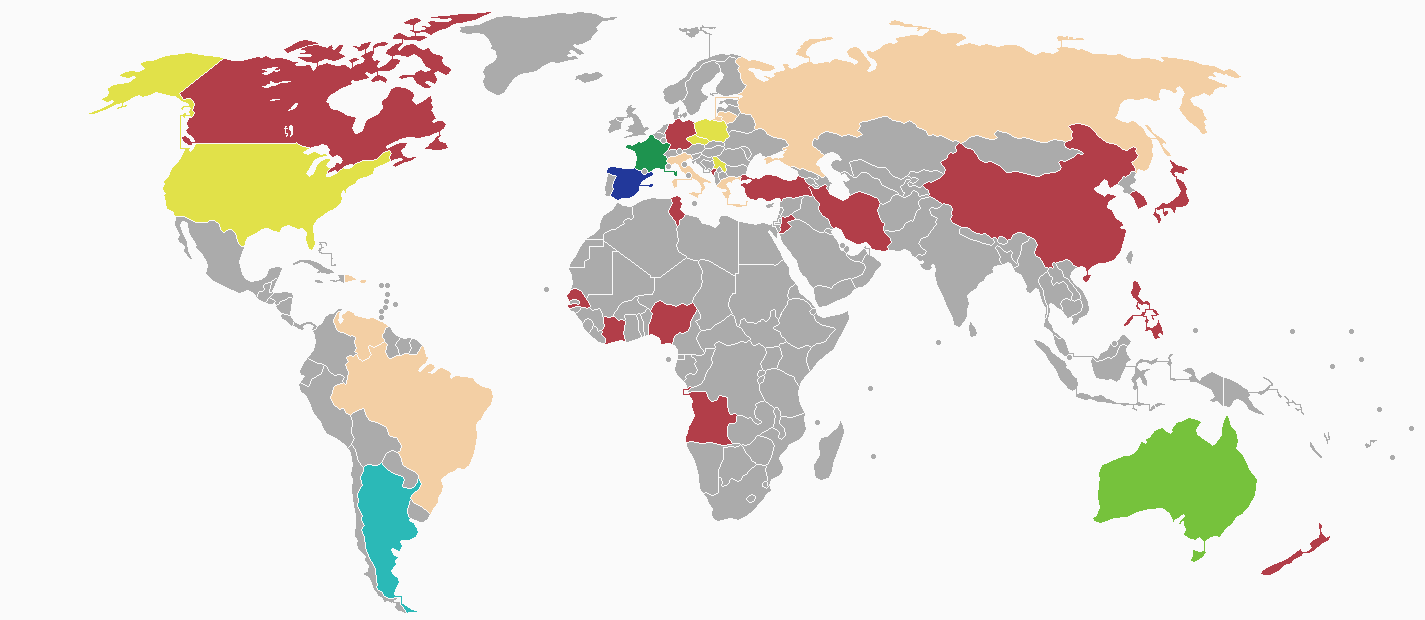
2019 FIBA World Championship final rankings.

=== Classification of teams ===
1. Highest number of points earned, with each game result having a corresponding point:
  - Win: 2 points
  - Loss: 1 point
  - Loss by default: 1 point, with a final score of 2–0 for the opponents of the defaulting team if the latter team is not trailing or if the score is tied, or the score at the time of stoppage if they are trailing.
  - Loss by forfeit: 0 points, with a final score of 20–0 for the opponents of the forfeiting team.
2. Head-to-head record via points system above
3. Point difference in games among tied teams
4. Points for in games among tied teams
5. Point difference in all group games
6. Points for in all group games

Source: FIBA

=== Group A ===
Venue: Wukesong Arena, Beijing

| Pos | Team | Pld | W | L | PF | PA | PD | Pts | Qualification |
|---|---|---|---|---|---|---|---|---|---|
| 1 | Poland | 3 | 3 | 0 | 239 | 208 | +31 | 6 | Second round |
| 2 | Venezuela | 3 | 2 | 1 | 228 | 210 | +18 | 5 | Second round |
| 3 | China (H) | 3 | 1 | 2 | 205 | 206 | −1 | 4 | 17th–32nd classification |
| 4 | Ivory Coast | 3 | 0 | 3 | 189 | 237 | −48 | 3 | 17th–32nd classification |

Source: FIBA
Rules for classification: Tiebreakers
(H) Hosts

31 August 2019
| Poland | 80–69 | Venezuela |
| Ivory Coast | 55–70 | China |
2 September 2019
| Venezuela | 87–71 | Ivory Coast |
| China | 76–79 (OT) | Poland |
4 September 2019
| Ivory Coast | 63–80 | Poland |
| Venezuela | 72–59 | China |

=== Group B ===
Venue : Wuhan Sports Center Gymnasium, Wuhan

| Pos | Team | Pld | W | L | PF | PA | PD | Pts | Qualification |
|---|---|---|---|---|---|---|---|---|---|
| 1 | Argentina | 3 | 3 | 0 | 258 | 211 | +47 | 6 | Second round |
| 2 | Russia | 3 | 2 | 1 | 230 | 219 | +11 | 5 | Second round |
| 3 | Nigeria | 3 | 1 | 2 | 266 | 242 | +24 | 4 | 17th–32nd classification |
| 4 | South Korea | 3 | 0 | 3 | 208 | 290 | −82 | 3 | 17th–32nd classification |

Source: FIBA
Rules for classification: Tiebreakers

31 August 2019
| Russia | 82–77 | Nigeria |
| Argentina | 95–69 | South Korea |
2 September 2019
| Nigeria | 81–94 | Argentina |
| South Korea | 73–87 | Russia |
4 September 2019
| South Korea | 66–108 | Nigeria |
| Russia | 61–69 | Argentina |

=== Group C ===
Venue: Guangzhou Gymnasium, Guangzhou

| Pos | Team | Pld | W | L | PF | PA | PD | Pts | Qualification |
|---|---|---|---|---|---|---|---|---|---|
| 1 | Spain | 3 | 3 | 0 | 247 | 190 | +57 | 6 | Second round |
| 2 | Puerto Rico | 3 | 2 | 1 | 213 | 218 | −5 | 5 | Second round |
| 3 | Tunisia | 3 | 1 | 2 | 205 | 235 | −30 | 4 | 17th–32nd classification |
| 4 | Iran | 3 | 0 | 3 | 213 | 235 | −22 | 3 | 17th–32nd classification |

Source: FIBA
Rules for classification: Tiebreakers

31 August 2019
| Iran | 81–83 | Puerto Rico |
| Spain | 101–62 | Tunisia |
2 September 2019
| Tunisia | 79–67 | Iran |
| Puerto Rico | 63–73 | Spain |
4 September 2019
| Puerto Rico | 67–64 | Tunisia |
| Spain | 73–65 | Iran |

=== Group D ===
Venue: Foshan International Sports and Cultural Center, Foshan

| Pos | Team | Pld | W | L | PF | PA | PD | Pts | Qualification |
|---|---|---|---|---|---|---|---|---|---|
| 1 | Serbia | 3 | 3 | 0 | 323 | 203 | +120 | 6 | Second round |
| 2 | Italy | 3 | 2 | 1 | 277 | 215 | +62 | 5 | Second round |
| 3 | Angola | 3 | 1 | 2 | 204 | 278 | −74 | 4 | 17th–32nd classification |
| 4 | Philippines | 3 | 0 | 3 | 210 | 318 | −108 | 3 | 17th–32nd classification |

Source: FIBA
Rules for classification: Tiebreakers

31 August 2019
| Angola | 59–105 | Serbia |
| Philippines | 62–108 | Italy |
2 September 2019
| Italy | 92–61 | Angola |
| Serbia | 126–67 | Philippines |
4 September 2019
| Angola | 84–81 (OT) | Philippines |
| Italy | 77–92 | Serbia |

=== Group E ===
Venue: Shanghai Oriental Sports Center, Shanghai

| Pos | Team | Pld | W | L | PF | PA | PD | Pts | Qualification |
|---|---|---|---|---|---|---|---|---|---|
| 1 | United States | 3 | 3 | 0 | 279 | 204 | +75 | 6 | Second round |
| 2 | Czech Republic | 3 | 2 | 1 | 247 | 240 | +7 | 5 | Second round |
| 3 | Turkey | 3 | 1 | 2 | 254 | 251 | +3 | 4 | 17th–32nd classification |
| 4 | Japan | 3 | 0 | 3 | 188 | 273 | −85 | 3 | 17th–32nd classification |

Source: FIBA
Rules for classification: Tiebreakers

1 September 2019
| Turkey | 86–67 | Japan |
| Czech Republic | 67–88 | United States |
3 September 2019
| Japan | 76–89 | Czech Republic |
| United States | 93–92 (OT) | Turkey |
5 September 2019
| Turkey | 76–91 | Czech Republic |
| United States | 98–45 | Japan |

=== Group F ===
Venue: Nanjing Youth Olympic Sports Park Gymnasium, Nanjing

| Pos | Team | Pld | W | L | PF | PA | PD | Pts | Qualification |
|---|---|---|---|---|---|---|---|---|---|
| 1 | Brazil | 3 | 3 | 0 | 265 | 245 | +20 | 6 | Second round |
| 2 | Greece | 3 | 2 | 1 | 266 | 236 | +30 | 5 | Second round |
| 3 | New Zealand | 3 | 1 | 2 | 284 | 288 | −4 | 4 | 17th–32nd classification |
| 4 | Montenegro | 3 | 0 | 3 | 216 | 262 | −46 | 3 | 17th–32nd classification |

Source: FIBA
Rules for classification: Tiebreakers

1 September 2019
| New Zealand | 94–102 | Brazil |
| Greece | 85–60 | Montenegro |
3 September 2019
| Montenegro | 83–93 | New Zealand |
| Brazil | 79–78 | Greece |
5 September 2019
| Brazil | 84–73 | Montenegro |
| Greece | 103–97 | New Zealand |

=== Group G ===
Venue: Shenzhen Bay Sports Centre, Shenzhen

| Pos | Team | Pld | W | L | PF | PA | PD | Pts | Qualification |
|---|---|---|---|---|---|---|---|---|---|
| 1 | France | 3 | 3 | 0 | 271 | 194 | +77 | 6 | Second round |
| 2 | Dominican Republic | 3 | 2 | 1 | 206 | 234 | −28 | 5 | Second round |
| 3 | Germany | 3 | 1 | 2 | 238 | 210 | +28 | 4 | 17th–32nd classification |
| 4 | Jordan | 3 | 0 | 3 | 202 | 279 | −77 | 3 | 17th–32nd classification |

Updated to match(es) played on completed. Source: FIBA
Rules for classification: Tiebreakers

1 September 2019
| Dominican Republic | 80–76 | Jordan |
| France | 78–74 | Germany |
3 September 2019
| Germany | 68–70 | Dominican Republic |
| Jordan | 64–103 | France |
5 September 2019
| Germany | 96–62 | Jordan |
| Dominican Republic | 56–90 | France |

=== Group H ===
Venue: Dongfeng Nissan Cultural and Sports Centre, Dongguan

| Pos | Team | Pld | W | L | PF | PA | PD | Pts | Qualification |
|---|---|---|---|---|---|---|---|---|---|
| 1 | Australia | 3 | 3 | 0 | 276 | 242 | +34 | 6 | Second round |
| 2 | Lithuania | 3 | 2 | 1 | 275 | 203 | +72 | 5 | Second round |
| 3 | Canada | 3 | 1 | 2 | 243 | 260 | −17 | 4 | 17th–32nd classification |
| 4 | Senegal | 3 | 0 | 3 | 175 | 264 | −89 | 3 | 17th–32nd classification |

Source: FIBA
Rules for classification: Tiebreakers

1 September 2019
| Canada | 92–108 | Australia |
| Senegal | 47–101 | Lithuania |
3 September 2019
| Australia | 81–68 | Senegal |
| Lithuania | 92–69 | Canada |
5 September 2019
| Canada | 82–60 | Senegal |
| Lithuania | 82–87 | Australia |

== Second round ==
=== Group I ===
Venue: Foshan International Sports and Cultural Center, Foshan

| Pos | Team | Pld | W | L | PF | PA | PD | Pts | Qualification |
|---|---|---|---|---|---|---|---|---|---|
| 1 | Argentina | 5 | 5 | 0 | 436 | 343 | +93 | 10 | Quarter-finals |
| 2 | Poland | 5 | 4 | 1 | 383 | 373 | +10 | 9 | Quarter-finals |
| 3 | Russia | 5 | 3 | 2 | 373 | 358 | +15 | 8 | |
| 4 | Venezuela | 5 | 2 | 3 | 355 | 366 | −11 | 7 | |

Source: FIBA
Rules for classification: Tiebreakers

6 September 2019
| Poland | 79–74 | Russia |
| Argentina | 87–67 | Venezuela |
8 September 2019
| Venezuela | 60–69 | Russia |
| Poland | 65–91 | Argentina |

=== Group J ===
Venue: Wuhan Sports Center Gymnasium, Wuhan

| Pos | Team | Pld | W | L | PF | PA | PD | Pts | Qualification |
|---|---|---|---|---|---|---|---|---|---|
| 1 | Spain | 5 | 5 | 0 | 395 | 319 | +76 | 10 | Quarter-finals |
| 2 | Serbia | 5 | 4 | 1 | 482 | 331 | +151 | 9 | Quarter-finals |
| 3 | Italy | 5 | 3 | 2 | 431 | 371 | +60 | 8 | |
| 4 | Puerto Rico | 5 | 2 | 3 | 349 | 402 | −53 | 7 | |

Source: FIBA
Rules for classification: Tiebreakers

6 September 2019
| Serbia | 90–47 | Puerto Rico |
| Spain | 67–60 | Italy |
8 September 2019
| Puerto Rico | 89–94 (OT) | Italy |
| Spain | 81–69 | Serbia |

=== Group K ===
Venue: Shenzhen Bay Sports Centre, Shenzhen

| Pos | Team | Pld | W | L | PF | PA | PD | Pts | Qualification |
|---|---|---|---|---|---|---|---|---|---|
| 1 | United States | 5 | 5 | 0 | 437 | 330 | +107 | 10 | Quarter-finals |
| 2 | Czech Republic | 5 | 3 | 2 | 417 | 395 | +22 | 8 (Note: Czech Republic 1–1, +15, Greece 1–1, +6, Brazil 1–1, –21) | Quarter-finals |
| 3 | Greece | 5 | 3 | 2 | 403 | 382 | +21 | 8 | |
| 4 | Brazil | 5 | 3 | 2 | 409 | 427 | −18 | 8 | |

Source: FIBA
Rules for classification: Tiebreakers
Notes:

7 September 2019
| Brazil | 71–93 | Czech Republic |
| United States | 69–53 | Greece |
9 September 2019
| Czech Republic | 77–84 | Greece |
| United States | 89–73 | Brazil |

=== Group L ===
Venue: Nanjing Youth Olympic Sports Park Gymnasium, Nanjing

| Pos | Team | Pld | W | L | PF | PA | PD | Pts | Qualification |
|---|---|---|---|---|---|---|---|---|---|
| 1 | Australia | 5 | 5 | 0 | 458 | 416 | +42 | 10 | Quarter-finals |
| 2 | France | 5 | 4 | 1 | 447 | 369 | +78 | 9 | Quarter-finals |
| 3 | Lithuania | 5 | 3 | 2 | 424 | 336 | +88 | 8 | |
| 4 | Dominican Republic | 5 | 2 | 3 | 337 | 390 | −53 | 7 | |

Source: FIBA
Rules for classification: Tiebreakers

7 September 2019
| Australia | 82–76 | Dominican Republic |
| France | 78–75 | Lithuania |
9 September 2019
| Dominican Republic | 55–74 | Lithuania |
| France | 98–100 | Australia |

== 17th–32nd Classification ==
Bottom 2 teams from each group in Round 1 played in the Classification Round.

=== Group M ===
Venue: Guangzhou Gymnasium, Guangzhou

| Pos | Team | Pld | W | L | PF | PA | PD | Pts |
|---|---|---|---|---|---|---|---|---|
| 1 | Nigeria | 5 | 3 | 2 | 435 | 381 | +54 | 8 |
| 2 | China (H) | 5 | 2 | 3 | 355 | 365 | −10 | 7 |
| 3 | South Korea | 5 | 1 | 4 | 361 | 438 | −77 | 6 |
| 4 | Ivory Coast | 5 | 0 | 5 | 326 | 400 | −74 | 5 |

Source: FIBA
Rules for classification: Tiebreakers
(H) Hosts

6 September 2019
| Nigeria | 83–66 | Ivory Coast |
| China | 77–73 | South Korea |
8 September 2019
| Ivory Coast | 71–80 | South Korea |
| China | 73–86 | Nigeria |

=== Group N ===
Venue: Wukesong Arena, Beijing

| Pos | Team | Pld | W | L | PF | PA | PD | Pts |
|---|---|---|---|---|---|---|---|---|
| 1 | Tunisia | 5 | 3 | 2 | 377 | 386 | −9 | 8 |
| 2 | Iran | 5 | 2 | 3 | 379 | 372 | +7 | 7 |
| 3 | Angola | 5 | 1 | 4 | 350 | 435 | −85 | 6 |
| 4 | Philippines | 5 | 0 | 5 | 352 | 499 | −147 | 5 |

Source: FIBA
Rules for classification: Tiebreakers

6 September 2019
| Angola | 62–71 | Iran |
| Tunisia | 86–67 | Philippines |
8 September 2019
| Tunisia | 86–84 | Angola |
| Iran | 95–75 | Philippines |

=== Group O ===
Venue: Dongfeng Nissan Cultural and Sports Centre, Dongguan

| Pos | Team | Pld | W | L | PF | PA | PD | Pts |
|---|---|---|---|---|---|---|---|---|
| 1 | New Zealand | 5 | 3 | 2 | 497 | 470 | +27 | 8 |
| 2 | Turkey | 5 | 2 | 3 | 434 | 427 | +7 | 7 |
| 3 | Montenegro | 5 | 1 | 4 | 370 | 406 | −36 | 6 |
| 4 | Japan | 5 | 0 | 5 | 334 | 464 | −130 | 5 |

Source: FIBA
Rules for classification: Tiebreakers

7 September 2019
| New Zealand | 111–81 | Japan |
| Turkey | 79–74 | Montenegro |
9 September 2019
| Japan | 65–80 | Montenegro |
| Turkey | 101–102 | New Zealand |

=== Group P ===
Venue: Shanghai Oriental Sports Center, Shanghai

| Pos | Team | Pld | W | L | PF | PA | PD | Pts |
|---|---|---|---|---|---|---|---|---|
| 1 | Germany | 5 | 3 | 2 | 409 | 364 | +45 | 8 |
| 2 | Canada | 5 | 2 | 3 | 445 | 413 | +32 | 7 |
| 3 | Jordan | 5 | 1 | 4 | 352 | 482 | −130 | 6 |
| 4 | Senegal | 5 | 0 | 5 | 330 | 432 | −102 | 5 |

Source: FIBA
Rules for classification: Tiebreakers

7 September 2019
| Canada | 126–71 | Jordan |
| Germany | 89–78 | Senegal |
9 September 2019
| Jordan | 79–77 | Senegal |
| Germany | 82–76 | Canada |

== Final round ==
Fifth place
14 September – Beijing
Serbia | 90
Czech Republic | 81
Seventh place
14 September – Beijing
United States | 87
Poland | 74

5th–8th classification
12 September – Dongguan
Serbia | 94
United States | 89
12 September – Shanghai
Poland | 84
Czech Republic | 94

Quarter-finals
10 September – Dongguan
Argentina | 97
Serbia | 87
11 September – Dongguan
United States | 79
France | 89
10 September – Shanghai
Spain | 90
Poland | 78
11 September – Shanghai
Australia | 82
Czech Republic | 70

Semi-finals
13 September – Beijing
Argentina | 80
France | 66
13 September – Beijing
Spain (2OT) | 95
Australia | 88

Final
15 September – Beijing
Argentina | 75
Spain | 95
Third place game
15 September – Beijing
France | 67
Australia | 59

=== Quarter-finals ===
==== Argentina vs. Serbia ====
10 September 2019
19:00

Boxscore

| Argentina | 97–87 | Serbia |
Scoring by quarter: 25–23, 29–26, 14–18, 29–20
| Pts: Scola 20; Rebs: Deck 8 Asts: Campazzo 12 | | Pts: Bogdanović 21; Rebs: Jokić 10; Asts: Jokić 5 |

Dongfeng Nissan Cultural and Sports Centre, Dongguan
Attendance: 8,469
Referees: Cristiano Maranho (BRA), Tolga Şahin (ITA), Michael Weiland (CAN)

==== Spain vs. Poland ====
10 September 2019
21:00

Boxscore

| Spain | 90–78 | Poland |
Scoring by quarter: 22–18, 24–23, 21–17, 23–20
| Pts: Rubio 19; Rebs: Rubio 5 Asts: Rubio 9 | | Pts: Slaughter 19; Rebs: Ponitka 11; Asts: Slaughter 6 |

Shanghai Oriental Sports Center, Shanghai
Attendance: 13,300
Referees: Jorge Vázquez (PUR), Yohan Rosso (FRA), Takaki Kato (JPN)

==== United States vs. France ====
11 September 2019
19:00

Boxscore

| United States | 79–89 | France |
Scoring by quarter: 18–18, 21–27, 27–18, 13–26
| Pts: Mitchell 29; Rebs: Mitchell 6 Asts: Barnes, Mitchell 4 | | Pts: Fournier 22; Rebs: Gobert 16; Asts: Fournier 4 |

Dongfeng Nissan Cultural and Sports Centre, Dongguan
Attendance: 11,019
Referees: Guilherme Locatelli (BRA), Georgios Poursanidis (GRE), Ferdinand Pascual (PHI)

==== Australia vs. Czech Republic ====
11 September 2019
21:00

Boxscore

| Australia | 82–70 | Czech Republic |
Scoring by quarter: 17–17, 16–13, 30–18, 19–22
| Pts: Mills 24; Rebs: Kay 7 Asts: Mills 6 | | Pts: Auda 21; Rebs: Satoranský 9 Asts: Satoranský 13 |

Shanghai Oriental Sports Center, Shanghai
Attendance: 13,800
Referees: Roberto Vázquez (PUR), Ademir Zurapović (BIH), Matthew Kallio (CAN)

=== Classification semi-finals ===
==== Serbia vs. United States ====
12 September 2019
19:00

Boxscore

| Serbia | 94–89 | United States |
Scoring by quarter: 32–7, 12–33, 27–28, 23–21
| Pts: Bogdanović 28; Rebs: Bjelica 5 Asts: Jokić 7 | | Pts: Barnes 22; Rebs: Middleton 6 Asts: Walker 8 |

Dongfeng Nissan Cultural and Sports Centre, Dongguan
Attendance: 9,540
Referees: Cristiano Maranho (BRA), Yu Jung (TPE), Luis Castillo (ESP)

==== Poland vs. Czech Republic ====
12 September 2019
21:00

Boxscore

| Poland | 84–94 | Czech Republic |
Scoring by quarter: 23–23, 12–20, 28–21, 21–30
| Pts: Waczyński 22; Rebs: Kulig 7 Asts: Slaughter 10 | | Pts: Hruban 24; Rebs: Hruban 12; Asts: Satoranský 12 |

Shanghai Oriental Sports Center, Shanghai
Attendance: 8,016
Referees: Juan Fernández (ARG), Boris Krejić (SLO), Yohan Rosso (FRA)

=== Semi-finals ===
==== Spain vs. Australia ====
13 September 2019
16:00

Boxscore

| Spain | 95–88 (2OT) | Australia |
Scoring by quarter: 22–21, 10–16, 19–18, 20–16, Overtime: 9–9, 15–8
| Pts: Gasol 33; Rebs: Rubio 7 Asts: Rubio 12 | | Pts: Mills 32; Rebs: Kay 11; Asts: Dellavedova 9 |

Wukesong Arena, Beijing
Attendance: 5,934
Referees: Guilherme Locatelli (BRA), Tolga Şahin (ITA), Omar Bermúdez (MEX)

==== Argentina vs. France ====
13 September 2019
20:00

Boxscore

| Argentina | 80–66 | France |
Scoring by quarter: 21–18, 18–14, 21–16, 20–18
| Pts: Scola 28; Rebs: Scola 13; Asts: Campazzo 6 | | Pts: Fournier, Ntilikina 16; Rebs: Gobert 11; Asts: De Colo 4 |

Wukesong Arena, Beijing
Attendance: 7,945
Referees: Steven Anderson (USA), Ademir Zurapović (BIH), Jorge Vázquez (PUR)

=== Seventh place playoff ===
14 September 2019
16:00

Boxscore

| United States | 87–74 | Poland |
Scoring by quarter: 28–14, 19–16, 16–25, 24–19
| Pts: Mitchell 16; Rebs: Turner 8 Asts: Mitchell 10 | | Pts: Ponitka 18; Rebs: Ponitka 7 Asts: Slaughter 5 |

Wukesong Arena, Beijing
Attendance: 8,210
Referees: Aleksandar Glišić (SRB), Yu Jung (TPE), Takaki Kato (JPN)

=== Fifth place playoff ===
14 September 2019
20:00

Boxscore

| Serbia | 90–81 | Czech Republic |
Scoring by quarter: 20–20, 21–30, 28–12, 21–19
| Pts: Bogdanović 31; Rebs: Jokić 14; Asts: Jokić 7 | | Pts: Auda 16; Rebs: Balvín 10; Asts: Satoranský 6 |

Wukesong Arena, Beijing
Attendance: 8,252
Referees: Guilherme Locatelli (BRA), Georgios Poursanidis (GRE), Michael Weiland (CAN)

=== Third place playoff ===
15 September 2019
16:00

Boxscore

| France | 67–59 | Australia |
Scoring by quarter: 11–16, 10–14, 21–16, 25–13
| Pts: De Colo 19; Rebs: Poirier 7 Asts: Batum 6 | | Pts: Ingles 17; Rebs: Bogut 6 Asts: Dellavedova 5 |

Wukesong Arena, Beijing
Attendance: 7,749
Referees: Roberto Vázquez (PUR), Ademir Zurapović (BIH), Ferdinand Pascual (PHI)

=== Final ===
15 September 2019
20:00

Boxscore

| Argentina | 75–95 | Spain |
Scoring by quarter: 14–23, 17–20, 16–23, 28–29
| Pts: Deck 24; Rebs: Scola 8 Asts: Campazzo 8 | | Pts: Rubio 20; Rebs: Fernández 10; Asts: Gasol 7 |

Wukesong Arena, Beijing
Attendance: 11,110
Referees: Cristiano Maranho (BRA), Yohan Rosso (FRA), Steven Anderson (USA)

== Final standings ==
| Pos | Team | Pld | W | L | PF | PA | PD | Qualification |
|---|---|---|---|---|---|---|---|---|
| 1st place, gold medalist(s) | Spain (Note: Spain and France qualified to the Summer Olympics as the top 2 teams from FIBA Europe.) | 8 | 8 | 0 | 675 | 560 | +115 | Qualification to Summer Olympics |
| 2nd place, silver medalist(s) | Argentina (Note: Argentina and USA qualified to the Summer Olympics as the top 2 teams from FIBA Americas.) | 8 | 7 | 1 | 688 | 591 | +97 | Qualification to Summer Olympics |
| 3rd place, bronze medalist(s) | France | 8 | 6 | 2 | 669 | 587 | +82 | Qualification to Summer Olympics |
| 4 | Australia (Note: Australia qualified to the Summer Olympics as top team from FIBA Oceania.) | 8 | 6 | 2 | 687 | 648 | +39 | Qualification to Summer Olympics |
| 5 | Serbia | 8 | 6 | 2 | 753 | 598 | +155 | Qualification to Olympic Qualifying Tournament (Note: The 16 best non-qualifying teams will proceed to an Olympic Qualifying Tournament.) |
| 6 | Czech Republic | 8 | 4 | 4 | 662 | 651 | +11 | Qualification to Olympic Qualifying Tournament |
| 7 | United States | 8 | 6 | 2 | 692 | 587 | +105 | Qualification to Summer Olympics |
| 8 | Poland | 8 | 4 | 4 | 619 | 644 | −25 | Qualification to Olympic Qualifying Tournament |
| 9 | Lithuania | 5 | 3 | 2 | 424 | 336 | +88 | Qualification to Olympic Qualifying Tournament |
| 10 | Italy | 5 | 3 | 2 | 431 | 371 | +60 | Qualification to Olympic Qualifying Tournament |
| 11 | Greece | 5 | 3 | 2 | 403 | 382 | +21 | Qualification to Olympic Qualifying Tournament |
| 12 | Russia | 5 | 3 | 2 | 373 | 358 | +15 | Qualification to Olympic Qualifying Tournament |
| 13 | Brazil | 5 | 3 | 2 | 409 | 427 | −18 | Qualification to Olympic Qualifying Tournament |
| 14 | Venezuela | 5 | 2 | 3 | 355 | 366 | −11 | Qualification to Olympic Qualifying Tournament |
| 15 | Puerto Rico | 5 | 2 | 3 | 349 | 402 | −53 | Qualification to Olympic Qualifying Tournament |
| 16 | Dominican Republic | 5 | 2 | 3 | 337 | 390 | −53 | Qualification to Olympic Qualifying Tournament |
| 17 | Nigeria (Note: Nigeria qualified to the Summer Olympics as top team from FIBA Africa.) | 5 | 3 | 2 | 435 | 381 | +54 | Qualification to Summer Olympics |
| 18 | Germany | 5 | 3 | 2 | 409 | 364 | +45 | Qualification to Olympic Qualifying Tournament |
| 19 | New Zealand (Note: In February 2021, New Zealand withdrew from the Olympic Qualifying Tournament.) | 5 | 3 | 2 | 497 | 470 | +27 | Qualification to Olympic Qualifying Tournament |
| 20 | Tunisia | 5 | 3 | 2 | 377 | 386 | −9 | Qualification to Olympic Qualifying Tournament |
| 21 | Canada | 5 | 2 | 3 | 445 | 413 | +32 | Qualification to Olympic Qualifying Tournament |
| 22 | Turkey | 5 | 2 | 3 | 434 | 427 | +7 | Qualification to Olympic Qualifying Tournament |
| 23 | Iran (Note: Iran qualified to the Summer Olympics as top team from FIBA Asia.) | 5 | 2 | 3 | 379 | 372 | +7 | Qualification to Summer Olympics |
| 24 | China (H) | 5 | 2 | 3 | 355 | 365 | −10 | |
| 25 | Montenegro | 5 | 1 | 4 | 370 | 406 | −36 | |
| 26 | South Korea | 5 | 1 | 4 | 361 | 438 | −77 | |
| 27 | Angola | 5 | 1 | 4 | 350 | 435 | −85 | |
| 28 | Jordan | 5 | 1 | 4 | 352 | 482 | −130 | |
| 29 | Ivory Coast | 5 | 0 | 5 | 326 | 400 | −74 | |
| 30 | Senegal | 5 | 0 | 5 | 330 | 432 | −102 | |
| 31 | Japan (Note: Japan qualified to the Summer Olympics as host country.) | 5 | 0 | 5 | 334 | 464 | −130 | Already qualified to Summer Olympics |
| 32 | Philippines (Note: New Zealand initially qualified for the Olympic Qualifying Tournament by virtue of the 2019 FIBA Basketball World Cup. On 26 February 2021, Basketball New Zealand announced that they would pull out of the tournament. On the same day, FIBA announced that they would be replaced by the Philippines as the next-best team from the Asia-Oceania region in FIBA World Rankings.) | 5 | 0 | 5 | 352 | 499 | −147 | |

Source: FIBA
Rules for classification: 1) Positions in each group; 2) Win–loss ratio; 3) Points difference; 4) Points scored; 5) Drawing of lots.
(H) Hosts

== Olympic qualification ==
Qualification to 2020 Summer Olympics
| Host | Japan |
| Zone | Team |
| Africa | Nigeria |
| Americas | Argentina, United States |
| Asia | Iran |
| Europe | France, Spain |
| Oceania | Australia |

Qualification to Olympic Qualifying Tournament
| Zone | Team |
|---|---|
| Africa | Tunisia |
| Americas | Brazil, Canada, Dominican Republic, Puerto Rico, Venezuela |
| Asia | —N/a |
| Europe | Czech Republic, Germany, Greece, Italy, Lithuania, Poland, Russia, Serbia, Turkey |
| Oceania | New Zealand |

== Awards ==
The all-star team and MVP were announced on 15 September 2019.

2019 FIBA Basketball World Cup champion

Spain
2nd title

=== All-Tournament Team ===
All-Star Team
| Guards | Forwards | Center |
|---|---|---|
| (Spain) Ricky Rubio (Serbia) Bogdan Bogdanović | (Argentina) Luis Scola (France) Evan Fournier | (Spain) Marc Gasol |
MVP: (Spain) Ricky Rubio

== Statistical leaders ==
=== Player tournament averages ===
==== Points ====
| # | Player | Pld | Pts | PPG |
|---|---|---|---|---|
| 1 | (South Korea) Ra Gun-ah | 5 | 115 | 23.0 |
| 2 | (Serbia) Bogdan Bogdanović | 8 | 183 | 22.9 |
| 3 | (New Zealand) Corey Webster | 5 | 114 | 22.8 |
| 3 | (Australia) Patty Mills | 8 | 182 | 22.8 |
| 5 | (Jordan) Dar Tucker | 5 | 105 | 21.0 |
| 6 | (Turkey) Cedi Osman | 5 | 102 | 20.4 |
| 7 | (France) Evan Fournier | 8 | 158 | 19.8 |
| 8 | (Germany) Dennis Schröder | 5 | 98 | 19.6 |
| 9 | (Turkey) Melih Mahmutoğlu | 5 | 93 | 18.6 |
| 10 | (New Zealand) Isaac Fotu | 5 | 92 | 18.4 |

==== Rebounds ====
| # | Player | Pld | Rebs | RPG |
|---|---|---|---|---|
| 1 | (South Korea) Ra Gun-ah | 5 | 64 | 12.8 |
| 2 | (Iran) Hamed Haddadi | 5 | 54 | 10.8 |
| 3 | (Tunisia) Salah Mejri | 5 | 51 | 10.2 |
| 4 | (France) Rudy Gobert | 8 | 73 | 9.1 |
| 5 | (Greece) Giannis Antetokounmpo | 5 | 44 | 8.8 |
| 5 | (Lithuania) Jonas Valančiūnas | 5 | 44 | 8.8 |
| 7 | (Angola) Yanick Moreira | 5 | 43 | 8.6 |
| 8 | (Philippines) Andray Blatche | 5 | 42 | 8.4 |
| 8 | (Czech Republic) Ondřej Balvín | 8 | 67 | 8.4 |
| 10 | (Argentina) Luis Scola | 8 | 65 | 8.1 |

==== Assists ====
| # | Player | Pld | Asts | APG |
|---|---|---|---|---|
| 1 | (Germany) Dennis Schröder | 5 | 47 | 9.4 |
| 2 | (Czech Republic) Tomáš Satoranský | 8 | 68 | 8.5 |
| 3 | (Argentina) Facundo Campazzo | 8 | 62 | 7.8 |
| 4 | (Dominican Republic) Gelvis Solano | 5 | 33 | 6.6 |
| 5 | (Turkey) Scottie Wilbekin | 4 | 26 | 6.5 |
| 6 | (Australia) Matthew Dellavedova | 8 | 50 | 6.3 |
| 7 | (Venezuela) Heissler Guillent | 5 | 31 | 6.2 |
| 8 | (Spain) Ricky Rubio | 8 | 48 | 6.0 |
| 9 | (Australia) Joe Ingles | 8 | 45 | 5.6 |
| 9 | (New Zealand) Corey Webster | 5 | 28 | 5.6 |

==== Blocks ====
| # | Player | Pld | Blks | BPG |
|---|---|---|---|---|
| 1 | (Tunisia) Salah Mejri | 5 | 16 | 3.2 |
| 2 | (France) Rudy Gobert | 8 | 15 | 1.9 |
| 3 | (Germany) Maxi Kleber | 5 | 9 | 1.8 |
| 3 | (United States) Myles Turner | 8 | 14 | 1.8 |
| 5 | (Lithuania) Jonas Valančiūnas | 5 | 8 | 1.6 |
| 6 | (Puerto Rico) Renaldo Balkman | 5 | 7 | 1.4 |
| 6 | (Canada) Khem Birch | 5 | 7 | 1.4 |
| 6 | (Senegal) Youssou Ndoye | 5 | 7 | 1.4 |
| 6 | (China) Zhou Qi | 5 | 7 | 1.4 |
| 10 | (Czech Republic) Ondřej Balvín | 8 | 10 | 1.3 |

==== Steals ====
| # | Player | Pld | Stls | SPG |
|---|---|---|---|---|
| 1 | (Tunisia) Omar Abada | 5 | 13 | 2.6 |
| 2 | (Greece) Giannis Antetokounmpo | 5 | 12 | 2.4 |
| 2 | (Philippines) Andray Blatche | 5 | 12 | 2.4 |
| 2 | (Nigeria) Josh Okogie | 5 | 12 | 2.4 |
| 5 | (Argentina) Facundo Campazzo | 8 | 16 | 2.0 |
| 5 | (Canada) Khem Birch | 5 | 10 | 2.0 |
| 5 | (Canada) Melvin Ejim | 5 | 10 | 2.0 |
| 5 | (Senegal) Maurice Ndour | 5 | 9 | 1.8 |
| 9 | (Tunisia) Makram Ben Romdhane | 5 | 9 | 1.8 |
| 9 | (Iran) Behnam Yakhchali | 5 | 9 | 1.8 |

==== Minutes ====
| # | Player | Pld | Mins | MPG |
|---|---|---|---|---|
| 1 | (South Korea) Ra Gun-ah | 5 | 180 | 36.1 |
| 2 | (Iran) Behnam Yakhchali | 5 | 176 | 35.4 |
| 3 | (Australia) Patty Mills | 8 | 271 | 33.9 |
| 3 | (Australia) Joe Ingles | 8 | 271 | 33.9 |
| 5 | (Czech Republic) Tomáš Satoranský | 8 | 265 | 33.2 |
| 6 | (Jordan) Dar Tucker | 5 | 165 | 33.0 |
| 7 | (Philippines) Andray Blatche | 5 | 164 | 32.9 |
| 8 | (Germany) Dennis Schröder | 5 | 164 | 32.8 |
| 8 | (Tunisia) Michael Roll | 5 | 163 | 32.8 |
| 10 | (Turkey) Cedi Osman | 5 | 153 | 32.7 |

==== Free throws ====
| # | Player | FTM | FTA | FT% |
|---|---|---|---|---|
| 1 | (Poland) Adam Waczyński | 28 | 30 | 93.3 |
| 1 | (Lithuania) Paulius Jankūnas | 14 | 15 | 93.3 |
| 1 | (Lithuania) Lukas Lekavičius | 14 | 15 | 93.3 |
| 4 | (Japan) Yuta Watanabe | 26 | 28 | 92.9 |
| 5 | (Serbia) Miroslav Raduljica | 21 | 23 | 91.3 |
| 6 | (Nigeria) Josh Okogie | 19 | 21 | 90.5 |
| 7 | (Czech Republic) Tomáš Satoranský | 27 | 30 | 90.0 |
| 8 | (France) Nando de Colo | 35 | 39 | 89.7 |
| 9 | (United States) Harrison Barnes | 24 | 27 | 88.9 |
| 10 | (Serbia) Vladimir Lučić | 21 | 24 | 87.5 |

==== Field goal shooting ====
| # | Player | FGM | FGA | FG% |
|---|---|---|---|---|
| 1 | (New Zealand) Isaac Fotu | 34 | 51 | 66.7 |
| 2 | (Lithuania) Jonas Valančiūnas | 27 | 42 | 64.3 |
| 3 | (Jordan) Ahmad Al Dwairi | 26 | 43 | 60.5 |
| 4 | (Turkey) Melih Mahmutoğlu | 37 | 64 | 57.8 |
| 5 | (Argentina) Gabriel Deck | 42 | 75 | 56.0 |
| 6 | (Serbia) Bogdan Bogdanović | 60 | 108 | 55.6 |
| 7 | (France) Nando de Colo | 42 | 77 | 54.5 |
| 8 | (Tunisia) Salah Mejri | 31 | 57 | 54.4 |
| 9 | (Philippines) CJ Perez | 25 | 46 | 54.3 |
| 10 | (New Zealand) Corey Webster | 39 | 72 | 54.2 |
| 10 | (Angola) Yanick Moreira | 26 | 48 | 54.2 |

==== Double-doubles ====
| # | Player | Pld | DblDbl | DD% |
|---|---|---|---|---|
| 1 | (South Korea) Ra Gun-ah | 5 | 5 | 100 |
| 2 | (Czech Republic) Ondřej Balvín | 8 | 3 | 37.5 |
| 2 | (Philippines) Andray Blatche | 5 | 3 | 60.0 |
| 2 | (Iran) Hamed Haddadi | 5 | 3 | 60.0 |
| 2 | (Germany) Dennis Schröder | 5 | 3 | 60.0 |
| 6 | (Greece) Giannis Antetokounmpo | 5 | 2 | 40.0 |
| 6 | (France) Rudy Gobert | 8 | 2 | 25.0 |
| 6 | (Serbia) Nikola Jokić | 8 | 2 | 25.0 |
| 6 | (Tunisia) Salah Mejri | 5 | 2 | 40.0 |
| 6 | (Senegal) Youssou Ndoye | 5 | 2 | 40.0 |
| 6 | (Czech Republic) Tomáš Satoranský | 8 | 2 | 25.0 |
| 6 | (Argentina) Luis Scola | 8 | 2 | 25.0 |
| 6 | (Lithuania) Jonas Valančiūnas | 5 | 2 | 40.0 |

==== Efficiency ====
| # | Player | Pld | MPG | PPG | Eff | EffPG |
|---|---|---|---|---|---|---|
| 1 | (South Korea) Ra Gun-ah | 5 | 36.1 | 23.0 | 132 | 26.4 |
| 2 | (New Zealand) Corey Webster | 5 | 29.8 | 22.8 | 128 | 25.6 |
| 3 | (Tunisia) Salah Mejri | 5 | 30.9 | 16.2 | 126 | 25.2 |
| 4 | (Serbia) Bogdan Bogdanović | 8 | 28.0 | 22.9 | 197 | 24.6 |
| 5 | (Germany) Dennis Schröder | 5 | 32.8 | 19.6 | 111 | 22.2 |
| 6 | (Czech Republic) Tomáš Satoranský | 8 | 33.2 | 15.5 | 172 | 21.5 |
| 7 | (Lithuania) Jonas Valančiūnas | 5 | 22.6 | 14.0 | 106 | 21.2 |
| 8 | (Italy) Danilo Gallinari | 5 | 29.8 | 17.2 | 101 | 20.2 |
| 9 | (Greece) Giannis Antetokounmpo | 5 | 24.9 | 14.8 | 100 | 20.0 |
| 10 | (New Zealand) Isaac Fotu | 5 | 24.6 | 18.4 | 98 | 19.6 |

=== Team tournament averages ===
==== Points ====
| # | Team | Pld | Pts | PPG |
|---|---|---|---|---|
| 1 | New Zealand | 5 | 497 | 99.4 |
| 2 | Serbia | 8 | 753 | 94.1 |
| 3 | Canada | 5 | 445 | 89.0 |
| 4 | Nigeria | 5 | 435 | 87.0 |
| 5 | Turkey | 5 | 434 | 86.8 |

==== Rebounds ====
| # | Team | Pld | Rebs | RPG |
|---|---|---|---|---|
| 1 | United States | 8 | 344 | 43.0 |
| 2 | Nigeria | 5 | 210 | 42.0 |
| 3 | New Zealand | 5 | 202 | 40.4 |
| 3 | Venezuela | 5 | 202 | 40.4 |
| 5 | South Korea | 5 | 200 | 40.0 |

==== Assists ====
| # | Team | Pld | Asts | APG |
|---|---|---|---|---|
| 1 | Serbia | 8 | 203 | 25.4 |
| 2 | Australia | 8 | 182 | 22.8 |
| 2 | Spain | 8 | 182 | 22.8 |
| 4 | Canada | 5 | 113 | 22.6 |
| 4 | New Zealand | 5 | 113 | 22.6 |

==== Blocks ====
| # | Team | Pld | Blks | BPG |
|---|---|---|---|---|
| 1 | Nigeria | 5 | 31 | 6.2 |
| 2 | Senegal | 5 | 24 | 4.8 |
| 3 | France | 8 | 34 | 4.3 |
| 4 | Tunisia | 5 | 21 | 4.2 |
| 5 | United States | 8 | 32 | 4.0 |
| 5 | Germany | 5 | 20 | 4.0 |

==== Steals ====
| # | Team | Pld | Stls | SPG |
|---|---|---|---|---|
| 1 | Nigeria | 5 | 56 | 11.2 |
| 2 | Argentina | 8 | 80 | 10.0 |
| 3 | Spain | 8 | 72 | 9.0 |
| 4 | China | 5 | 44 | 8.8 |
| 5 | Canada | 5 | 43 | 8.6 |

==== Free throws ====
| # | Team | Pld | FTM/A | FT% |
|---|---|---|---|---|
| 1 | Brazil | 5 | 72/87 | 82.8 |
| 2 | Puerto Rico | 5 | 64/78 | 82.1 |
| 3 | Germany | 5 | 75/92 | 81.5 |
| 4 | Lithuania | 5 | 91/112 | 81.3 |
| 5 | Serbia | 8 | 152/190 | 80.0 |

==== Field goal ====
| # | Team | Pld | FGM/A | FG% |
|---|---|---|---|---|
| 1 | Serbia | 8 | 260/486 | 53.5 |
| 2 | New Zealand | 5 | 171/338 | 50.6 |
| 3 | France | 8 | 236/484 | 48.8 |
| 4 | Lithuania | 5 | 155/319 | 48.6 |
| 5 | Australia | 8 | 252/523 | 48.2 |

=== Player game highs ===
| Category | Player | Team | Opponent | Total |
|---|---|---|---|---|
| Points | Ahmad Al Dwairi | Jordan | Dominican Republic | 34 |
| Points | Dar Tucker | Jordan | Senegal | 34 |
| Points | Yuta Watanabe | Japan | Montenegro | 34 |
| Points | Patty Mills | Australia | Spain | 34 |
| Rebounds | Hamed Haddadi | Iran | Puerto Rico | 16 |
| Rebounds | Ra Gun-ah | South Korea | Ivory Coast | 16 |
| Rebounds | Rudy Gobert | France | United States | 16 |
| Assists | Scottie Wilbekin | Turkey | Montenegro | 13 |
| Assists | Tomáš Satoranský | Czech Republic | Australia | 13 |
| Steals | Omar Abada | Tunisia | Puerto Rico | 6 |
| Blocks | Salah Mejri | Tunisia | Angola | 8 |

=== Team game highs ===
| Category | Team | Opponent | Total |
|---|---|---|---|
| Points | Canada | Jordan | 126 |
| Points | Serbia | Philippines | 126 |
| Rebounds | United States | Japan | 58 |
| Assists | Canada | Jordan | 37 |
| Assists | Serbia | Philippines | 37 |
| Steals | Argentina | Poland | 16 |
| Blocks | Nigeria | Argentina | 10 |
| Blocks | Montenegro | Japan | 10 |
| Difference | Serbia | Philippines | 59 |

== Marketing ==
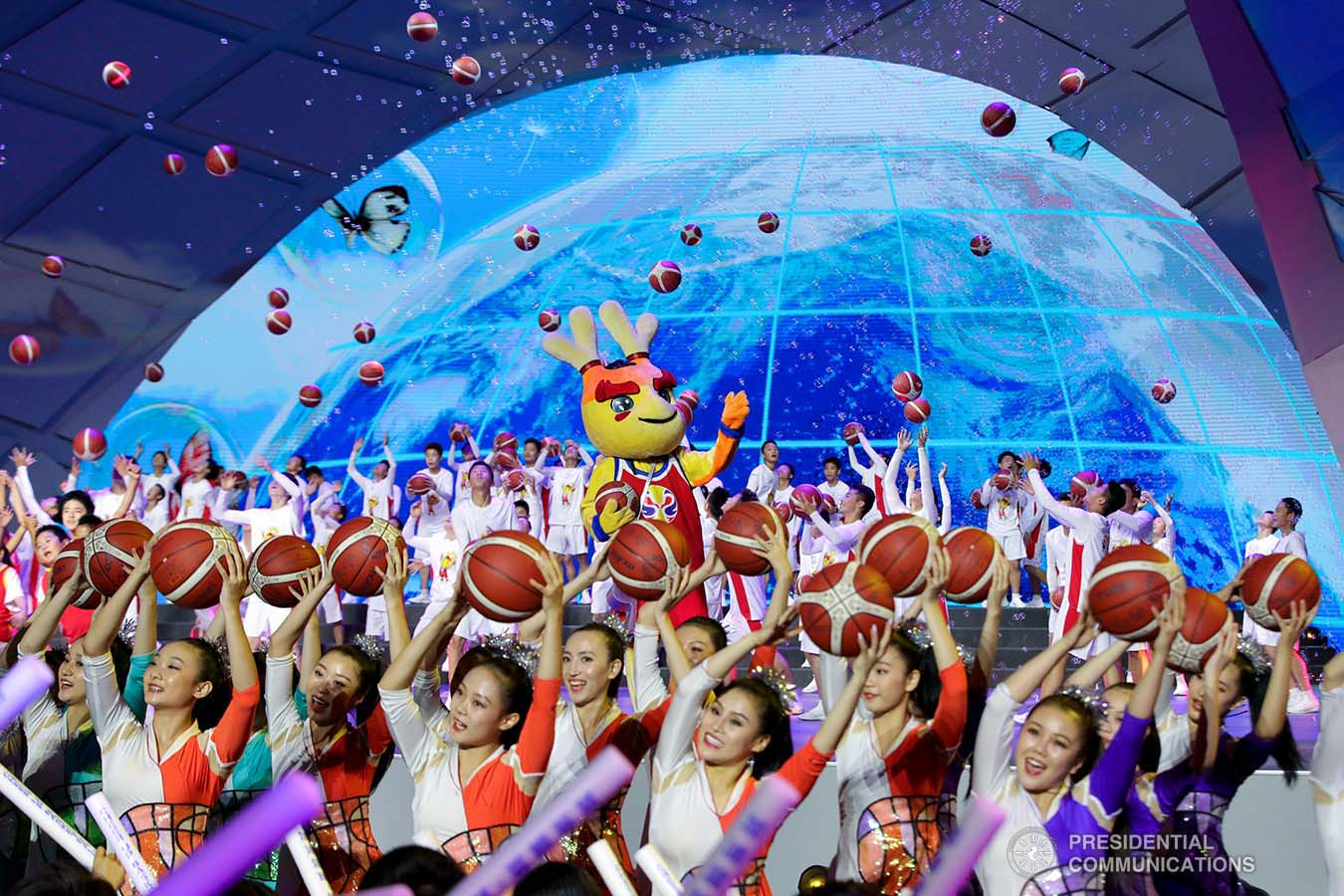
Opening ceremony of the 2019 FIBA Basketball World Cup.

=== Logo ===
The official logo of the 2019 FIBA Basketball World Cup was officially unveiled on 21 March 2017 in a ceremony held in Shanghai. The logo's concept was inspired from the Beijing Opera where the actors symbolize concepts such as wisdom, persistence, power and perfection, which are prerequisite characteristics that the participating players of national team will need to exhibit "in order to succeed". The logo design was also inspired from the Chinese Dragon Dance, a cultural tradition depicting a story of two flying dragons battling over a shining pearl which is meant to parallel the competition of national teams for the Naismith Trophy. The logo was created by Shanghai-based agency Flagship.

=== Sponsors ===
Infront China became the exclusive marketing partner for the domestic commercial rights of FIBA Basketball World Cup China 2019, according to a strategic cooperation agreement officially announced between Infront China, a Wanda Sports company, the International Basketball Federation (FIBA) and the Organizing Committee for the competition.

=== Mascot ===
An international mascot design competition was organized with the winning mascot chosen by fans. Yan Xu's design, a Chinese Dragon-inspired mascot named Son of Dreams, was announced to be the winning mascot on 18 April 2018. Son of Dreams was born in China on 8 August 2015 one day after China was announced as the host according to the mascot's fictional biography. The magical horns of the mascot is described as having the ability to give the dragon "the power to see in the future, envisioning plays and moves before they actually happen". He wears a red and blue uniform with the tournament's logo and high tops by China's top player Yao Ming. The mascot was chosen over other finalists Speed Tiger who was inspired by a Siberian tiger and QiuQiu (a.k.a. Little Lightning) who was inspired by a Chinese lion. The official mascot made his first public appearance on 28 June 2018 in Shenzhen.

=== Ball ===
On 16 March 2019, FIBA revealed the official ball that would be used in the World Cup, Molten BG5000, designed by Molten.

=== Official song ===
The song "Champion" was released on 24 July 2019, and performed by American singer-songwriter Jason Derulo featuring Chinese singer Tia Ray. It was performed both in English and the host language Chinese.

== Issues and concerns ==
There were concerns from national federations that they would not be able to play the qualifiers with players from top professional leagues globally (the National Basketball Association and EuroLeague), which was possible with professional leagues operating in mid-year.

== Broadcasters ==
The television rights holders by territory as follows:

| Territory | Rights holder | Ref |
|---|---|---|
| Andorra | Canal+; Mediaset | |
| Angola | TPA | |
| Argentina | DeporTV; TV Pública; TyC Sports | |
| Australia | Fox Sports | |
| Baltic states | TVPlay Sports | |
| Belgium | BeTV | |
| Bosnia and Herzegovina | Sport Klub | |
| Brazil | SporTV | |
| Bulgaria | BNT | |
| Canada | DAZN | |
| China | CCTV; Tencent | |
| Croatia | HRT; Sport Klub | |
| Cuba | ICRT | |
| Cyprus | CYTA | |
| Czech Republic | Czech Television | |
| Estonia | TV3 | |
| Finland | Yle | |
| France | Canal+ | |
| Georgia | GPB | |
| Germany | Magenta Sport | |
| Greece | ERT | |
| Hong Kong | I-Cable | |
| Hungary | M4 Sport | |
| Iceland | RÚV | |
| India | FanCode | |
| Indonesia | TVRI | |
| Ireland | Eurosport | |
| Israel | Sport 5 | |
| Italy | Sky Sport | |
| Japan | Fuji TV; DAZN | |
| Kosovo | RTK | |
| Latin America | DirecTV; Fox Sports | |
| Latvia | TV3 | |
| Lebanon | LBC | |
| Lithuania | TV3 | |
| Macau | TDM | |
| Malaysia | Astro | |
| MENA | beIN Sports | |
| Mongolia | NTV | |
| Montenegro | RTCG; Sport Klub | |
| Netherlands | Ziggo | |
| New Zealand | Māori Television; Sky | |
| Nordic | NENT | |
| North Macedonia | Sport Klub | |
| Pacific Islands | Melania Media | |
| Paraguay | TigoStarTV | |
| Philippines | Cignal; ESPN5 | |
| Poland | TVP | |
| Portugal | Eleven Sports | |
| Puerto Rico | WAPA-TV | |
| Qatar | Al Kass | |
| Russia | Match TV | |
| Senegal | RTS | |
| Serbia | RTS; Sport Klub | |
| Singapore | StarHub | |
| Slovenia | Pop TV | |
| South Korea | SPOTV | |
| Spain | DAZN; Mediaset | |
| Sub-Saharan Africa | StarTimes; Canal+ | |
| Switzerland | Canal+; SRG SSR; Teleclub | |
| Taiwan | Eleven Sports | |
| Turkey | NTV; S Sport | |
| Ukraine | XSPORT | |
| United Kingdom | Eurosport | |
| United States | ESPN | |
| Uruguay | ANTEL | |
| Vietnam | HTV | |

== See also ==
- 2018 FIBA Women's Basketball World Cup
