= 2019 FIBA Basketball World Cup Group L =

Basketball tournament group stage

Group L was one of four groups of the second round of the 2019 FIBA Basketball World Cup. It took place from 7 to 9 September 2019, and consisted of the top-two teams from Groups G and H. The results from the preliminary round were carried over. The teams from Group G played the teams from Group H, for a total of two games per team, with all matches played at Nanjing Youth Olympic Sports Park Gymnasium, Nanjing. After all of the games were played, the top two teams advanced to the quarter-finals, the third placed team was classified 9 to 12, and the fourth placed team 13 to 16.

== Qualified teams ==
Group	Winner	Runner-up
G	France	Dominican Republic
H	Australia	Lithuania

== Standings ==
Pos	Team	Pld	W	L	PF	PA	PD	Pts	Qualification
1	Australia	5	5	0	458	416	+42	10	Quarter-finals
2	France	5	4	1	447	369	+78	9	Quarter-finals
3	Lithuania	5	3	2	424	336	+88	8	
4	Dominican Republic	5	2	3	337	390	−53	7	

Source: FIBA
Rules for classification: Tiebreakers

All times are local UTC+8.

== Games ==
=== Australia vs. Dominican Republic ===
7 September 2019
16:00

Boxscore

Australia	82–76	Dominican Republic
Scoring by quarter: 24–19, 16–19, 17–14, 25–24
Pts: Mills 19; Rebs: Kay 8 Asts: Mills 9		Pts: Vargas 16; Rebs: Vargas 7 Asts: Solano 9

Nanjing Youth Olympic Sports Park Gymnasium, Nanjing
Attendance: 5,237
Referees: Tolga Şahin (ITA), Juan Fernández (ARG), Luis Castillo (ESP)

=== France vs. Lithuania ===
7 September 2019
20:00

Boxscore

France	78–75	Lithuania
Scoring by quarter: 26–14, 24–26, 15–14, 13–21
Pts: Fournier 24; Rebs: Gobert 8 Asts: Albicy, De Colo 4		Pts: Valančiūnas 18; Rebs: Valančiūnas 8 Asts: Sabonis 4

Nanjing Youth Olympic Sports Park Gymnasium, Nanjing
Attendance: 7,400
Referees: Antonio Conde (ESP), Daniel García (VEN), Leandro Lezcano (ARG)

=== Dominican Republic vs. Lithuania ===
9 September 2019
16:00

Boxscore

Dominican Republic	55–74	Lithuania
Scoring by quarter: 14–19, 10–19, 15–14, 16–22
Pts: Mendoza 14; Rebs: Rojas 6 Asts: Solano 6		Pts: Lekavičius, Valančiūnas 19; Rebs: Valančiūnas 10; Asts: Kalnietis 8

Nanjing Youth Olympic Sports Park Gymnasium, Nanjing
Attendance: 3,600
Referees: Steven Anderson (USA), Mārtiņš Kozlovskis (LAT), Hwang In-tae (KOR)

=== France vs. Australia ===
9 September 2019
20:00

Boxscore

France	98–100	Australia
Scoring by quarter: 24–23, 22–23, 29–25, 23–29
Pts: Fournier 31; Rebs: Fournier 6 Asts: Gobert 6		Pts: Mills 30; Rebs: Bogut 6 Asts: Dellavedova 9

Nanjing Youth Olympic Sports Park Gymnasium, Nanjing
Attendance: 5,970
Referees: Tolga Şahin (ITA), Juan Fernández (ARG), Luis Castillo (ESP)
