= 2019 FIBA Basketball World Cup Group M =

Group M was one of four groups of the classification round of the 2019 FIBA Basketball World Cup. It took place from 6 to 8 September 2019, and consisted of the bottom-two teams from Groups A and B. The results from the preliminary round were carried over. The teams in Group A played against the teams from Group B, with all games played at Guangzhou Gymnasium, Guangzhou. After all of the games were played, the first placed team was classified 17 to 20, the second placed team 21 to 24, the third placed team 25 to 28 and the fourth placed team 29 to 32.

== Qualified teams ==
Group	Third place	Fourth place
A	China	Ivory Coast
B	Nigeria	South Korea

== Standings ==
Pos	Team	Pld	W	L	PF	PA	PD	Pts
1	Nigeria	5	3	2	435	381	+54	8
2	China (H)	5	2	3	355	365	−10	7
3	South Korea	5	1	4	361	438	−77	6
4	Ivory Coast	5	0	5	326	400	−74	5

Source: FIBA
Rules for classification: Tiebreakers
(H) Hosts

All times are local UTC+8.

== Games ==
=== Nigeria vs. Ivory Coast ===
6 September 2019
16:00

Boxscore

Nigeria	83–66	Ivory Coast
Scoring by quarter: 24–18, 13–17, 26–11, 20–20
Pts: Vincent 15; Rebs: Diogu 9 Asts: Okogie 5		Pts: Thompson 19; Rebs: Thompson 9 Asts: Diabaté, Fofana 4

Guangzhou Gymnasium, Guangzhou
Attendance: 6,717
Referees: Georgios Poursanidis (GRE), Krishna Domínguez (MEX), Markos Michaelides (SUI)

=== China vs. South Korea ===
6 September 2019
20:00

Boxscore

China	77–73	South Korea
Scoring by quarter: 19–18, 16–14, 19–20, 23–21
Pts: Guo, Zhao R. 16; Rebs: Zhou 14; Asts: Guo 5		Pts: Ra Gun-ah 21; Rebs: Ra Gun-ah 12; Asts: Kim, Park 4

Guangzhou Gymnasium, Guangzhou
Attendance: 8,923
Referees: Michael Weiland (CAN), Carsten Straube (GER), James Boyer (AUS)

=== Ivory Coast vs. South Korea ===
8 September 2019
14:00

Boxscore

Ivory Coast	71–80	South Korea
Scoring by quarter: 14–18, 16–32, 17–16, 24–14
Pts: Abouo 15; Rebs: Fofana 7 Asts: Edi 4		Pts: Ra Gun-ah 26; Rebs: Ra Gun-ah 16; Asts: Park 6

Guangzhou Gymnasium, Guangzhou
Attendance: 7,213
Referees: Krishna Domínguez (MEX), James Boyer (AUS), Arnaud Kom Njilo (CMR)

=== China vs. Nigeria ===
8 September 2019
20:00

Boxscore

China	73–86	Nigeria
Scoring by quarter: 21–19, 10–16, 20–25, 22–26
Pts: Yi 27; Rebs: Wang 7 Asts: Sun 9		Pts: Okogie 18; Rebs: Aminu 8 Asts: Aminu 6

Guangzhou Gymnasium, Guangzhou
Attendance: 9,100
Referees: Michael Weiland (CAN), Georgios Poursanidis (GRE), Carsten Straube (GER)
