= 2019 FIBA Basketball World Cup Group I =

Basketball tournament group stage

Group I was one of four groups of the second round of the 2019 FIBA Basketball World Cup. It took place from 6 to 8 September 2019, and consisted of the top-two teams from Groups A and B. The results from the preliminary round were carried over. The teams from Group A played the teams from Group B, for a total of two games per team, with all matches played at Foshan International Sports and Cultural Center, Foshan. After all of the games were played, the top two teams advanced to the quarter-finals, the third placed team was classified 9 to 12, and the fourth placed team 13 to 16.

== Qualified teams ==
Group	Winner	Runner-up
A	Poland	Venezuela
B	Argentina	Russia

== Standings ==
Pos	Team	Pld	W	L	PF	PA	PD	Pts	Qualification
1	Argentina	5	5	0	436	343	+93	10	Quarter-finals
2	Poland	5	4	1	383	373	+10	9	Quarter-finals
3	Russia	5	3	2	373	358	+15	8	
4	Venezuela	5	2	3	355	366	−11	7	

Source: FIBA
Rules for classification: Tiebreakers

All times are local UTC+8.

== Games ==
=== Poland vs. Russia ===
6 September 2019
16:00

Boxscore

Poland	79–74	Russia
Scoring by quarter: 16–22, 18–18, 19–17, 26–17
Pts: Waczyński 18; Rebs: Ponitka 9 Asts: Koszarek 4		Pts: Kulagin 21; Rebs: Vorontsevich 10; Asts: Karasev, Kurbanov 4

Foshan International Sports and Cultural Center, Foshan
Attendance: 7,400
Referees: Ademir Zurapović (BIH), Yu Jung (TPE), Takaki Kato (JPN)

=== Argentina vs. Venezuela ===
6 September 2019
20:00

Boxscore

Argentina	87–67	Venezuela
Scoring by quarter: 17–12, 21–13, 25–22, 24–20
Pts: Deck 25; Rebs: Scola 6 Asts: Campazzo 9		Pts: Carrera 19; Rebs: Colmenares 7 Asts: Vargas 5

Foshan International Sports and Cultural Center, Foshan
Attendance: 11,400
Referees: Yohan Rosso (FRA), Matthew Myers (USA), Yevgeniy Mikheyev (KAZ)

=== Venezuela vs. Russia ===
8 September 2019
16:00

Boxscore

Venezuela	60–69	Russia
Scoring by quarter: 10–13, 17–14, 15–21, 18–21
Pts: Carrera 19; Rebs: Carrera 10; Asts: Guillent 5		Pts: Vorontsevich 17; Rebs: Vorontsevich 9 Asts: Vorontsevich 5

Foshan International Sports and Cultural Center, Foshan
Attendance: 12,000
Referees: Yohan Rosso (FRA), Takaki Kato (JPN), Ye Nan (CHN)

=== Poland vs. Argentina ===
8 September 2019
20:00

Boxscore

Poland	65–91	Argentina
Scoring by quarter: 14–20, 13–22, 14–28, 24–21
Pts: Slaughter 16; Rebs: Hrycaniuk 6 Asts: Koszarek 5		Pts: Scola 21; Rebs: Fjellerup, Scola 6 Asts: Laprovíttola 7

Foshan International Sports and Cultural Center, Foshan
Attendance: 14,000
Referees: Ademir Zurapović (BIH), Matthew Myers (USA), Yu Jung (TPE)
