= 2019 FIBA Basketball World Cup Group O =

Group O was one of four groups of the classification round of the 2019 FIBA Basketball World Cup. It took place from 7 to 9 September 2019, and consisted of the bottom-two teams from Groups E and F. The results from the preliminary round were carried over. The teams in Group E played against the teams from Group F, with all games played at Dongfeng Nissan Cultural and Sports Centre, Dongguan. After all of the games were played, the first placed team was classified 17 to 20, the second placed team 21 to 24, the third placed team 25 to 28 and the fourth placed team 29 to 32.

== Qualified teams ==
Group	Third place	Fourth place
E	Turkey	Japan
F	New Zealand	Montenegro

== Standings ==
Pos	Team	Pld	W	L	PF	PA	PD	Pts
1	New Zealand	5	3	2	497	470	+27	8
2	Turkey	5	2	3	434	427	+7	7
3	Montenegro	5	1	4	370	406	−36	6
4	Japan	5	0	5	334	464	−130	5

Source: FIBA
Rules for classification: Tiebreakers

All times are local UTC+8.

== Games ==
=== New Zealand vs. Japan ===
7 September 2019
15:30

Boxscore

New Zealand	111–81	Japan
Scoring by quarter: 29–29, 26–10, 27–22, 29–20
Pts: C. Webster 27; Rebs: Fotu 10; Asts: T. Webster 9		Pts: Fazekas 31; Rebs: Fazekas 9 Asts: Tanaka 5

Dongfeng Nissan Cultural and Sports Centre, Dongguan
Attendance: 4,933
Referees: Sergiy Zashchuk (UKR), Kim Jong-kuk (KOR), Kingsley Ojeaburu (NGR)

=== Turkey vs. Montenegro ===
7 September 2019
19:30

Boxscore

Turkey	79–74	Montenegro
Scoring by quarter: 16–26, 16–11, 17–21, 30–16
Pts: Osman 19; Rebs: Birsen 8 Asts: Wilebekin 13		Pts: Vučević 20; Rebs: Dubljević 8 Asts: Popović, Vučević 5

Dongfeng Nissan Cultural and Sports Centre, Dongguan
Attendance: 6,218
Referees: Roberto Vázquez (PUR), Andrés Bartel (URU), Michał Proc (POL)

=== Japan vs. Montenegro ===
9 September 2019
15:30

Boxscore

Japan	65–80	Montenegro
Scoring by quarter: 16–26, 17–14, 18–21, 14–19
Pts: Watanabe 34; Rebs: Watanabe 9 Asts: Baba 5		Pts: Vučević 18; Rebs: Bjelica, Vučević 7 Asts: Needham 8

Dongfeng Nissan Cultural and Sports Centre, Dongguan
Attendance: 2,275
Referees: Sergiy Zashchuk (UKR), Michał Proc (POL), Kim Jong-kuk (KOR)

=== Turkey vs. New Zealand ===
9 September 2019
19:30

Boxscore

Turkey	101–102	New Zealand
Scoring by quarter: 31–26, 22–24, 24–24, 24–28
Pts: Osman 32; Rebs: Birsen, Osman 6 Asts: Wilbekin 7		Pts: Fotu, Loe 17; Rebs: Delany 7 Asts: C. Webster 5

Dongfeng Nissan Cultural and Sports Centre, Dongguan
Attendance: 3,987
Referees: Roberto Vázquez (PUR), Andrés Bartel (URU), Duan Zhu (CHN)
