= 2019 FIBA Basketball World Cup Group K =

Basketball tournament group stage

Group K was one of four groups of the second round of the 2019 FIBA Basketball World Cup. It took place from 7 to 9 September 2019, and consisted of the top-two teams from Groups E and F. The results from the preliminary round were carried over. The teams from Group E played the teams from Group F, for a total of two games per team, with all matches played at Shenzhen Bay Sports Centre, Shenzhen. After all of the games were played, the top two teams advanced to the quarter-finals, the third placed team was classified 9 to 12, and the fourth placed team 13 to 16.

== Qualified teams ==
Group	Winner	Runner-up
E	United States	Czech Republic
F	Brazil	Greece

== Standings ==
Pos	Team	Pld	W	L	PF	PA	PD	Pts	Qualification
1	United States	5	5	0	437	330	+107	10	Quarter-finals
2	Czech Republic	5	3	2	417	395	+22	8 (Note: Czech Republic 1–1, +15, Greece 1–1, +6, Brazil 1–1, –21)	Quarter-finals
3	Greece	5	3	2	403	382	+21	8	
4	Brazil	5	3	2	409	427	−18	8	

Source: FIBA
Rules for classification: Tiebreakers
Notes:

All times are local UTC+8.

== Games ==
=== Brazil vs. Czech Republic ===
7 September 2019
16:30

Boxscore

Brazil	71–93	Czech Republic
Scoring by quarter: 16–20, 16–25, 14–20, 25–28
Pts: Benite 12; Rebs: Varejão 5 Asts: Huertas 6		Pts: Satoranský 20; Rebs: Balvín 11; Asts: Satoranský 9

Shenzhen Bay Sports Centre, Shenzhen
Attendance: 7,958
Referees: Saverio Lanzarini (ITA), Julio Anaya (PAN), Andris Aunkrogers (LAT)

=== United States vs. Greece ===
7 September 2019
20:30

Boxscore

United States	69–53	Greece
Scoring by quarter: 19–17, 19–8, 16–12, 15–16
Pts: Walker 15; Rebs: Brown 9 Asts: Walker 6		Pts: G. Antetokounmpo 15; Rebs: G. Antetokounmpo 13; Asts: Calathes 5

Shenzhen Bay Sports Centre, Shenzhen
Attendance: 11,080
Referees: Aleksandar Glišić (SRB), Ferdinand Pascual (PHI), Wojciech Liszka (POL)

=== Czech Republic vs. Greece ===
9 September 2019
16:30

Boxscore

Czech Republic	77–84	Greece
Scoring by quarter: 12–18, 21–14, 16–25, 28–27
Pts: Bohačík 25; Rebs: Balvín 9 Asts: Satoranský 9		Pts: Calathes 27; Rebs: G. Antetokounmpo 9 Asts: Calathes 6

Shenzhen Bay Sports Centre, Shenzhen
Attendance: 8,150
Referees: Aleksandar Glišić (SRB), Andris Aunkrogers (LAT), Wojciech Liszka (POL)

=== United States vs. Brazil ===
9 September 2019
20:30

Boxscore

United States	89–73	Brazil
Scoring by quarter: 21–18, 22–21, 24–17, 22–17
Pts: Turner, Walker 16; Rebs: Turner 8 Asts: Mitchell 7		Pts: Benite 21; Rebs: Varejão 8 Asts: Huertas 5

Shenzhen Bay Sports Centre, Shenzhen
Attendance: 10,870
Referees: Saverio Lanzarini (ITA), Ferdinand Pascual (PHI), Julio Anaya (PAN)
