= 2019 FIBA Basketball World Cup Group N =

Group N was one of four groups of the classification round of the 2019 FIBA Basketball World Cup. It took place from 6 to 8 September 2019, and consisted of the bottom-two teams from Groups C and D. The results from the preliminary round were carried over. The teams in Group C played against the teams from Group D, with all games played at Wukesong Arena, Beijing. After all of the games were played, the first placed team was classified 17 to 20, the second placed team 21 to 24, the third placed team 25 to 28 and the fourth placed team 29 to 32.

== Qualified teams ==
Group	Third place	Fourth place
C	Tunisia	Iran
D	Angola	Philippines

== Standings ==
Pos	Team	Pld	W	L	PF	PA	PD	Pts
1	Tunisia	5	3	2	377	386	−9	8
2	Iran	5	2	3	379	372	+7	7
3	Angola	5	1	4	350	435	−85	6
4	Philippines	5	0	5	352	499	−147	5

Source: FIBA
Rules for classification: Tiebreakers

All times are local UTC+8.

== Games ==
=== Angola vs. Iran ===
6 September 2019
16:00

Boxscore

Angola	62–71	Iran
Scoring by quarter: 17–19, 12–9, 16–20, 17–23
Pts: Morais 17; Rebs: Moreira 7 Asts: four players 2		Pts: Nikkhah 21; Rebs: Geramipoor 7 Asts: Yakhchali 4

Wukesong Arena, Beijing
Attendance: 6,127
Referees: Yener Yılmaz (TUR), Scott Beker (AUS), Nicolas Fernandes (TAH)

=== Tunisia vs. Philippines ===
6 September 2019
20:00

Boxscore

Tunisia	86–67	Philippines
Scoring by quarter: 27–10, 19–14, 21–15, 19–28
Pts: Abada 16; Rebs: Mejri 12; Asts: Roll 4		Pts: Blatche 24; Rebs: Blatche 11; Asts: five players 2

Wukesong Arena, Beijing
Attendance: 8,468
Referees: Matthew Kallio (CAN), Boris Krejić (SLO), Harja Jaladri (INA)

=== Tunisia vs. Angola ===
8 September 2019
16:00

Boxscore

Tunisia	86–84	Angola
Scoring by quarter: 31–20, 21–17, 15–28, 19–19
Pts: Roll 21; Rebs: Mejri, Romdhane 8 Asts: Romdhane 6		Pts: Moreira 21; Rebs: Moreira 9 Asts: Domingos 6

Wukesong Arena, Beijing
Attendance: 10,268
Referees: Yener Yılmaz (TUR), Boris Krejić (SLO), Harja Jaladri (INA)

=== Iran vs. Philippines ===
8 September 2019
20:00

Boxscore

Iran	95–75	Philippines
Scoring by quarter: 30–24, 18–10, 27–16, 20–25
Pts: Haddadi 19; Rebs: Haddadi 7 Asts: Jamshidi, Yakhchali 5		Pts: Bolick 15; Rebs: Blatche 5 Asts: Blatche 5

Wukesong Arena, Beijing
Attendance: 9,765
Referees: Matthew Kallio (CAN), Scott Beker (AUS), Nicolas Fernandes (TAH)
