= 2019 FIBA Basketball World Cup Group P =

Group P was one of four groups of the classification round of the 2019 FIBA Basketball World Cup. It took place from 7 to 9 September 2019, and consisted of the bottom-two teams from Groups G and H. The results from the preliminary round were carried over. The teams in Group G played against the teams from Group H, with all games played at Shanghai Oriental Sports Center, Shanghai. After all of the games were played, the first placed team was classified 17 to 20, the second placed team 21 to 24, the third placed team 25 to 28 and the fourth placed team 29 to 32.

== Qualified teams ==
Group	Third place	Fourth place
G	Germany	Jordan
H	Canada	Senegal

== Standings ==
Pos	Team	Pld	W	L	PF	PA	PD	Pts
1	Germany	5	3	2	409	364	+45	8
2	Canada	5	2	3	445	413	+32	7
3	Jordan	5	1	4	352	482	−130	6
4	Senegal	5	0	5	330	432	−102	5

Source: FIBA
Rules for classification: Tiebreakers

All times are local UTC+8.

== Games ==
=== Canada vs. Jordan ===
7 September 2019
16:00

Boxscore

Canada	126–71	Jordan
Scoring by quarter: 31–13, 32–22, 36–15, 27–21
Pts: Wiltjer 29; Rebs: Birch, Klassen 7 Asts: Joseph 8		Pts: Tucker 13; Rebs: Abuwazaneh 6 Asts: Abdeen 4

Shanghai Oriental Sports Center, Shanghai
Attendance: 12,800
Referees: Jorge Vázquez (PUR), Martin Horozov (BUL), Felipe Ibarra (CHI)

=== Germany vs. Senegal ===
7 September 2019
20:00

Boxscore

Germany	89–78	Senegal
Scoring by quarter: 14–11, 22–26, 30–23, 23–18
Pts: Schröder 24; Rebs: Voigtmann 9 Asts: Schröder 12		Pts: I. Faye, Ndour 17; Rebs: I. Faye 7 Asts: D'Almeida 6

Shanghai Oriental Sports Center, Shanghai
Attendance: 14,300
Referees: Manuel Mazzoni (ITA), Gentian Cici (ALB), Carlos Peralta (ECU)

=== Jordan vs. Senegal ===
9 September 2019
16:00

Boxscore

Jordan	79–77	Senegal
Scoring by quarter: 22–16, 13–20, 20–20, 24–21
Pts: Tucker 34; Rebs: Tucker 11; Asts: Ibrahim 9		Pts: Ndoye 22; Rebs: Ndoye 11; Asts: D'Almeida 7

Shanghai Oriental Sports Center, Shanghai
Attendance: 8,400
Referees: Manuel Mazzoni (ITA), Alexis Mercado (PUR), Carlos Peralta (ECU)

=== Germany vs. Canada ===
9 September 2019
20:00

Boxscore

Germany	82–76	Canada
Scoring by quarter: 17–12, 19–21, 20–23, 26–20
Pts: Schröder 21; Rebs: Schröder 10; Asts: Schröder 9		Pts: Wiltjer 18; Rebs: Birch 9 Asts: Joseph 6

Shanghai Oriental Sports Center, Shanghai
Attendance: 12,600
Referees: Jorge Vázquez (PUR), Gentian Cici (ALB), Martin Horozov (BUL)
