= 2019 FIBA Basketball World Cup Group C =

Basketball tournament group stage

Group C was one of eight groups of the preliminary round of the 2019 FIBA Basketball World Cup. It took place from 31 August to 4 September 2019, and consisted of Iran, Puerto Rico, Spain, and Tunisia. Each team played each other once, for a total of three games per team, with all games played at Guangzhou Gymnasium, Guangzhou. After all of the games were played, the top two teams with the best records qualified for the Second round and the bottom two teams played in the Classification Round.

== Teams ==
Team	Qualification		Appearance			Best performance	FIBA World Ranking
Team	As	Date	Last	Total	Streak	Best performance	FIBA World Ranking
Spain	European Second Round Group I Top 3	2 December 2018	2014	12	10	Champions (2006)	2
Iran	Asian Second Round Group F Top 3	24 February 2019	2014	3	3	19th place (2010)	27
Puerto Rico	Americas Second Round Group E Top 3	25 February 2019	2014	14	9	4th place (1990)	16
Tunisia	African Second Round Group E Top 2	15 September 2018	2010	2	1	24th place (2010)	51

== Standings ==
Pos	Team	Pld	W	L	PF	PA	PD	Pts	Qualification
1	Spain	3	3	0	247	190	+57	6	Second round
2	Puerto Rico	3	2	1	213	218	−5	5	Second round
3	Tunisia	3	1	2	205	235	−30	4	17th–32nd classification
4	Iran	3	0	3	213	235	−22	3	17th–32nd classification

Source: FIBA
Rules for classification: Tiebreakers

== Games ==
All times are local (UTC+8).

=== Iran vs. Puerto Rico ===
This was the first competitive game between Iran and Puerto Rico.

31 August 2019
16:30

Boxscore

Iran	81–83	Puerto Rico
Scoring by quarter: 30–16, 19–15, 16–20, 16–32
Pts: Haddadi, Yakhchali 22; Rebs: Haddadi 16; Asts: Jamshidi 5		Pts: Huertas 32; Rebs: Balkman 6 Asts: three players 4

Guangzhou Gymnasium, Guangzhou
Attendance: 4,434
Referees: Ademir Zurapović (BIH), Georgios Poursanidis (GRE), Ye Nan (CHN)

=== Spain vs. Tunisia ===
This was the first competitive game between Spain and Tunisia.

31 August 2019
20:30

Boxscore

Spain	101–62	Tunisia
Scoring by quarter: 16–17, 26–22, 30–8, 29–15
Pts: Rubio 17; Rebs: J. Hernangómez 8 Asts: W. Hernangómez, Llull 5		Pts: Mejri 15; Rebs: Mejri 7 Asts: Abada 6

Guangzhou Gymnasium, Guangzhou
Attendance: 6,817
Referees: Michael Weiland (CAN), Krishna Domínguez (MEX), James Boyer (AUS)

=== Tunisia vs. Iran ===
This was the second game in the World Cup between Tunisia and Iran. The Iranians won in 2010, which was also the last competitive game between the two teams.

2 September 2019
16:30

Boxscore

Tunisia	79–67	Iran
Scoring by quarter: 29–19, 15–16, 15–13, 20–19
Pts: Mejri 22; Rebs: Mejri 15; Asts: three players 5		Pts: Geramipoor 18; Rebs: Haddadi 11; Asts: Haddadi 8

Guangzhou Gymnasium, Guangzhou
Attendance: 6,462
Referees: Ademir Zurapović (BIH), Krishna Domínguez (MEX), Arnaud Kom Njilo (CMR)

=== Puerto Rico vs. Spain ===
This was the second meeting in the World Cup between Puerto Rico and Spain. The Puerto Ricans won in 2002, which was also the last competitive game between the two teams.

2 September 2019
20:30

Boxscore

Puerto Rico	63–73	Spain
Scoring by quarter: 21–17, 14–19, 10–21, 18–16
Pts: Clavell 13; Rebs: three players 5 Asts: Browne 6		Pts: Gasol 19; Rebs: Rubio 8 Asts: Fernández 6

Guangzhou Gymnasium, Guangzhou
Attendance: 8,715
Referees: Michael Weiland (CAN), Georgios Poursanidis (GRE), James Boyer (AUS)

=== Puerto Rico vs. Tunisia ===
This was the first competitive game between Puerto Rico and Tunisia.

4 September 2019
16:30

Boxscore

Puerto Rico	67–64	Tunisia
Scoring by quarter: 19–18, 19–14, 14–23, 15–9
Pts: Balkman 14; Rebs: Balkman 9 Asts: Browne 8		Pts: Abada, Mejri 14; Rebs: Ben Romdhane 9 Asts: Roll 5

Guangzhou Gymnasium, Guangzhou
Attendance: 6,913
Referees: Ademir Zurapović (BIH), Georgios Poursanidis (GRE), Krishna Domínguez (MEX)

=== Spain vs. Iran ===
This was the second meeting in the World Cup between Spain and Iran. The Spaniards won in 2014, which was also the last competitive game between the two teams.

4 September 2019
20:30

Boxscore

Spain	73–65	Iran
Scoring by quarter: 18–21, 15–10, 19–22, 21–12
Pts: Gasol 16; Rebs: J. Hernangómez 10; Asts: Rubio 5		Pts: Jamshidi 15; Rebs: Haddadi 15; Asts: Nikkhah, Haddadi 6

Guangzhou Gymnasium, Guangzhou
Attendance: 8,803
Referees: Michael Weiland (CAN), Arnaud Kom Njilo (CMR), Ye Nan (CHN)
