= 2019 Australian International Basketball series =

Basketball competition

The 2019 Australian International Basketball series, was a men's international basketball competition between national teams, scheduled to be held from 23–27 August 2019 in various venues in Australia. The tournament is organized prior to the 2019 FIBA Basketball World Cup hosted by China. The competition is played under FIBA rules. National teams of Australia, Canada, New Zealand, and United States played at the tournament.

== Participating teams ==
- Australia
- Canada
- New Zealand
- United States

== Matches ==
16 August 2019
17:30

Report
Boxscore

Australia	70–90	Canada
Scoring by quarter: 20-25, 16-21, 24-21, 10-23
Pts: Landale 18; Rebs: Bogut 13; Asts: Dellavedova 6		Pts: Pangos 18; Rebs: Nembhard 10; Asts: Pangos 6

RAC Arena, Perth
Attendance: 3,500
Referees: Scott Beker
James Boyer
Nico Fernandez

17 August 2019
17:30

Report
Boxscore

Canada	73–81	Australia
Scoring by quarter: 18-17, 15-13, 26-30, 14-21
Pts: Birch 18; Rebs: Ejim 7 Asts: Scrubb 6		Pts: Landale 13; Rebs: Landale 9 Asts: Ingles 6

RAC Arena, Perth
Attendance: 8,000
Referees: Craig Copes
James Boyer
Nico Fernandez

22 August 2019

Report

New Zealand	100–103	Canada
Pts: C Webster 33		Pts: Scrubb 24

Quaycentre, Sydney
Attendance: not available
Referees: not available

August 22, 2019
19:30

Boxscore
Report

Australia	86–102	United States
Scoring by quarter: 20–22, 23–22, 18–32, 25–26
Pts: Tied 19; Rebs: Landale 7 Asts: Dellavedova 6		Pts: Walker 23; Rebs: Turner 14; Asts: Tatum 4

Marvel Stadium, Melbourne
Attendance: 51,218
Referees: Scott Beker
Nico Fernandez
James Boyer

August 24, 2019
14:00

Boxscore
Report

Australia	98–94	United States
Scoring by quarter: 23–26, 25–23, 30–27, 20–18
Pts: Mills 30; Rebs: Bogut 9 Asts: Ingles 7		Pts: Walker 22; Rebs: Barnes 6 Asts: Smart 3

Marvel Stadium, Melbourne
Attendance: 52,079
Referees: Michael Aylen
Chris Reid
Jon Chapman

August 26, 2019
19:30

Boxscore

Canada	68–84	United States
Scoring by quarter: 9–20, 22–26, 16–18, 21–20
Pts: Wiltjer 18; Rebs: Birch 6 Asts: Pangos, Nembhard, Wiltjer 2		Pts: Brown 19; Rebs: Turner 15; Asts: Mitchell 4

Qudos Bank Arena, Sydney
Attendance: 15,155
Referees: Michael Aylen
Chris Reid
Vaughan Mayberry

== See also ==
- 2019 Australia FIBA Basketball World Cup team
- 2019 Canada FIBA Basketball World Cup team
- 2019 New Zealand FIBA Basketball World Cup team
- 2019 United States FIBA Basketball World Cup team
