= Basketball at the 2020 Summer Olympics – Men's qualification =

The men's qualification for the Olympic basketball tournament took place from 2019 to 2021; all five FIBA (International Basketball Federation) zones were expected to have representation in the Olympic basketball event. (The Olympics was postponed to 2021 due to the COVID-19 pandemic).

Japan as host qualified directly. The first qualifying tournament was the 2019 FIBA Basketball World Cup in which seven teams qualified for the Olympics. The next best 16 teams in the FIBA Basketball World that did not qualify directly to the Olympics along with two select teams from each of the four FIBA regions or 24 teams participated in four separate wild card tournaments which determined the final four teams which played in the Olympics.

== Method ==
A total of 12 teams took part in the Olympics, with each NOC sending in one team.

=== Qualification via hosting the Olympics ===
Japan qualified to participate in the Olympic men's basketball event as the host nation.

=== Qualification via World Cup ===
The best finishing team/s in the 2019 FIBA Basketball World Cup from each FIBA zone qualifies directly to the Olympics.

- FIBA Africa: 1 team
- FIBA Americas: 2 teams
- FIBA Asia: 1 team
- FIBA Europe: 2 teams
- FIBA Oceania: 1 team

=== Qualification via the wild card tournament ===
The additional four qualifying teams were determined through four FIBA World Olympic Qualifying Tournaments of six teams each, i.e., 24 teams in total. The tournaments were contested by the 16 best non-qualifying teams at the 2019 World Cup and an additional eight teams—two teams from each of the four regions of Africa, Americas, Asia (and Oceania), and Europe. According to the 2019 FIBA Basketball World Cup results, each zone is allocated with the following berths:

- FIBA Africa: 3 teams
- FIBA Americas: 7 teams
- FIBA Asia and FIBA Oceania: 3 teams
- FIBA Europe : 11 teams

== Qualified teams ==
Means of qualification		Date	Venue	Berths	Qualified
Host nation		—	—	1	Japan
2019 FIBA Basketball World Cup	Africa	31 August – 15 September 2019	China	1	Nigeria
2019 FIBA Basketball World Cup	Americas	31 August – 15 September 2019	China	2	Argentina
2019 FIBA Basketball World Cup	Americas	31 August – 15 September 2019	China	2	United States
2019 FIBA Basketball World Cup	Asia	31 August – 15 September 2019	China	1	Iran
2019 FIBA Basketball World Cup	Europe	31 August – 15 September 2019	China	2	France
2019 FIBA Basketball World Cup	Europe	31 August – 15 September 2019	China	2	Spain
2019 FIBA Basketball World Cup	Oceania	31 August – 15 September 2019	China	1	Australia
2020 FIBA Men's Olympic Qualifying Tournaments		29 June – 4 July 2021	(Canada) Victoria	1	Czech Republic
2020 FIBA Men's Olympic Qualifying Tournaments		29 June – 4 July 2021	(Croatia) Split	1	Germany
2020 FIBA Men's Olympic Qualifying Tournaments		29 June – 4 July 2021	(Lithuania) Kaunas	1	Slovenia
2020 FIBA Men's Olympic Qualifying Tournaments		29 June – 4 July 2021	(Serbia) Belgrade	1	Italy
Total				12	

== 2019 FIBA Basketball World Cup ==
Final standing by FIBA zone

Qualify to the 2020 Summer Olympics via sub-zone rank
Qualify to the 2020 FIBA World Olympic Qualifying Tournament
Qualify to the 2020 Summer Olympics as the host country

#	FIBA Africa (1/5 teams)		FIBA Americas (2/7 teams)		FIBA Asia (1/6 teams)		FIBA Europe (2/12 teams)		FIBA Oceania (1/2 teams)	
#	Team	W–L	Team	W–L	Team	W–L	Team	W–L	Team	W–L
1	Nigeria	3–2	Argentina	7–1	Iran	2–3	Spain	8–0	Australia	6–2
2	Tunisia	3–2	United States	6–2	China	2–3	France	6–2	New Zealand	3–2
3	Angola	1–4	Brazil	3–2	South Korea	1–4	Serbia	6–2		
4	Ivory Coast	0–5	Venezuela	2–3	Jordan	1–4	Czech Republic	4–4		
5	Senegal	0–5	Puerto Rico	2–3	Japan	0–5	Poland	4–4		
6			Dominican Republic	2–3	Philippines	0–5	Lithuania	3–2		
7			Canada	2–3			Italy	3–2		
8							Greece	3–2		
9							Russia	3–2		
10							Germany	3–2		
11							Turkey	2–3		
12							Montenegro	1–4		

== FIBA World Olympic Qualifying Tournaments ==
After the 2019 FIBA Basketball World Cup results, each zone was represented by the following national teams:

Victoria, Split, Kaunas and Belgrade had been awarded the hosting rights of the four tournaments. They were originally scheduled to take place from 23 to 28 June 2020 but were postponed due to the COVID-19 pandemic, to 22 June to 4 July 2021, with the exact dates to be announced.

FIBA Africa	FIBA Americas	FIBA Europe	FIBA Asia and FIBA Oceania
Tunisia	Brazil	Serbia	~~New Zealand~~
Angola (WC)	Venezuela	Czech Republic	South Korea (WC)
Senegal (WC)	Puerto Rico	Poland	China (WC)
	Dominican Republic	Lithuania	Philippines (WC)
	Canada	Italy	
	Mexico (WC)	Greece	
	Uruguay (WC)	Russia	
		Germany	
Turkey
Croatia (WC)
Slovenia (WC)

The FIBA Olympic Qualifying Tournaments included the 16 best-placed non-qualified teams from the 2019 FIBA Basketball World Cup and two highest-ranked countries per region in the FIBA World Ranking. On 19 September 2019, FIBA announced those teams, which are Angola and Senegal (Africa), Mexico and Uruguay (Americas), China and Korea (Asia-Oceania), and Croatia and Slovenia (Europe).

New Zealand withdrew from the OQT in February 2021, which led to FIBA replacing them with the Philippines, the next best team from the Asia-Pacific region.

=== Draw ===
In 2020 four qualifying tournaments, each producing a team which was qualified for the 2020 Summer Olympics. The format consisted of 24 national teams divided into four tournaments of six teams each, with the winning team from each event qualifying for the Olympics. The draw took place on 27 November 2019.
