= 2019 FIBA Basketball World Cup Group G =

International basketball tournament

Group G was one of eight groups of the preliminary round of the 2019 FIBA Basketball World Cup. It took place from 1 to 5 September 2019, and consisted of the Dominican Republic, France, Germany, and Jordan. Each team played each other once, for a total of three games per team, with all games played at Shenzhen Bay Sports Centre, Shenzhen. After all of the games were played, the top two teams with the best records qualified for the Second round and the bottom two teams played in the Classification Round.

== Teams ==
Team	Qualification		Appearance			Best performance	FIBA World Ranking
Team	As	Date	Last	Total	Streak	Best performance	FIBA World Ranking
Dominican Republic	Americas best fourth placed team	25 February 2019	2014	3	2	12th place (1978)	18
France	European Second Round Group K Top 3	30 November 2018	2014	8	4	3rd place (2014)	3
Germany	European Second Round Group L Top 3	16 September 2018	2010	6	1	3rd place (2002)	22
Jordan	Asian Second Round Group E Top 3	24 February 2019	2010	2	1	23rd place (2010)	49

== Standings ==
Pos	Team	Pld	W	L	PF	PA	PD	Pts	Qualification
1	France	3	3	0	271	194	+77	6	Second round
2	Dominican Republic	3	2	1	206	234	−28	5	Second round
3	Germany	3	1	2	238	210	+28	4	17th–32nd classification
4	Jordan	3	0	3	202	279	−77	3	17th–32nd classification

Updated to match(es) played on completed. Source: FIBA
Rules for classification: Tiebreakers

== Games ==
All times are local (UTC+8).

=== Dominican Republic vs. Jordan ===
This was the first competitive game between the Dominican Republic and Jordan.

1 September 2019
16:30

Boxscore

Dominican Republic	80–76	Jordan
Scoring by quarter: 22–17, 25–19, 14–17, 19–23
Pts: Liz 15; Rebs: Roberts 6 Asts: Solano 7		Pts: Al-Dwairi 34; Rebs: Al-Dwairi 10; Asts: Abbas 4

Shenzhen Bay Sports Centre, Shenzhen
Attendance: 7,186
Referees: Tolga Şahin (ITA), Julio Anaya (PAN), Kingsley Ojeaburu (NGR)

=== France vs. Germany ===
This was the second game between Germany and France in the World Cup. The French won in 2006. The Germans won in EuroBasket 2017, the last competitive game between the two teams.

1 September 2019
20:30

Boxscore

France	78–74	Germany
Scoring by quarter: 16–4, 20–16, 23–30, 19–24
Pts: Fournier 26; Rebs: Fournier 10; Asts: Albicy 5		Pts: Voigtmann 25; Rebs: Theis 8 Asts: Schröder 8

Shenzhen Bay Sports Centre, Shenzhen
Attendance: 10,438
Referees: Juan Fernández (ARG), Luis Castillo (ESP), Daniel García (VEN)

=== Germany vs. Dominican Republic ===
This was the first competitive game between Germany and the Dominican Republic.

3 September 2019
16:30

Boxscore

Germany	68–70	Dominican Republic
Scoring by quarter: 21–16, 18–21, 13–18, 16–15
Pts: Schröder 20; Rebs: Theis 8 Asts: Schröder 7		Pts: Liz 17; Rebs: four players 5 Asts: Solano 11

Shenzhen Bay Sports Centre, Shenzhen
Attendance: 5,232
Referees: Tolga Şahin (ITA), Julio Anaya (PAN), Luis Castillo (ESP)

=== Jordan vs. France ===
This was the first competitive game between Jordan and France.

3 September 2019
20:30

Boxscore

Jordan	64–103	France
Scoring by quarter: 18–25, 15–25, 17–28, 14–25
Pts: Tucker 20; Rebs: Abbas, Al-Dwairi 7 Asts: Ibrahim 4		Pts: De Colo 19; Rebs: Gobert 13; Asts: De Colo 8

Shenzhen Bay Sports Centre, Shenzhen
Attendance: 8,389
Referees: Juan Fernández (ARG), Daniel García (VEN), Felipe Ibarra (CHI)

=== Germany vs. Jordan ===
This was the second competitive game between the Germany and Jordan.

5 September 2019
16:30

Boxscore

Germany	96–62	Jordan
Scoring by quarter: 28–17, 20–19, 18–13, 30–13
Pts: Kleber 18; Rebs: Barthel, Benzing 5 Asts: Schröder 11		Pts: Al Dwairi 17; Rebs: Al Dwairi 8 Asts: Abbas, Abdeen 3

Shenzhen Bay Sports Centre, Shenzhen
Attendance: 5,783
Referees: Juan Fernández (ARG), Daniel García (VEN), Kingsley Ojeaburu (NGR)

=== Dominican Republic vs. France ===
This was the first competitive game between the Dominican Republic and France.

5 September 2019
20:30

Boxscore

Dominican Republic	56–90	France
Scoring by quarter: 8–18, 13–25, 19–25, 16–22
Pts: Liz 12; Rebs: Roberts, Vargas 6 Asts: Ramón 3		Pts: De Colo 15; Rebs: Gobert, Poirier 8 Asts: Fournier 5

Shenzhen Bay Sports Centre, Shenzhen
Attendance: 10,252
Referees: Tolga Şahin (ITA), Luis Castillo (ESP), Felipe Ibarra (CHI)
