= 2019 FIBA Basketball World Cup Group H =

Basketball tournament group stage

Group H was one of eight groups of the preliminary round of the 2019 FIBA Basketball World Cup. It took place from 1 to 5 September 2019, and consisted of Australia, Canada, Lithuania, and Senegal. Each team played each other once, for a total of three games per team, with all games played at Dongfeng Nissan Cultural and Sports Centre, Dongguan. After all of the games were played, the top two teams with the best records qualified for the Second round and the bottom two teams played in the Classification Round.

== Teams ==
Team	Qualification		Appearance			Best performance	FIBA World Ranking
Team	As	Date	Last	Total	Streak	Best performance	FIBA World Ranking
Canada	Americas Second Round Group F Top 3	3 December 2018	2010	14	1	6th place (1978, 1982)	23
Senegal	African Second Round Group F Top 2	22 February 2019	2014	5	2	14th place (1978)	37
Lithuania	European Second Round Group J Top 3	17 September 2018	2014	5	4	3rd place (2010)	6
Australia	Asian Second Round Group F Top 3	30 November 2018	2014	12	4	5th place (1982, 1994)	11

== Standings ==
Pos	Team	Pld	W	L	PF	PA	PD	Pts	Qualification
1	Australia	3	3	0	276	242	+34	6	Second round
2	Lithuania	3	2	1	275	203	+72	5	Second round
3	Canada	3	1	2	243	260	−17	4	17th–32nd classification
4	Senegal	3	0	3	175	264	−89	3	17th–32nd classification

Source: FIBA
Rules for classification: Tiebreakers

== Games ==
All times are local (UTC+8).

=== Canada vs. Australia ===
This was sixth game between Canada and Australia in the World Cup. The Australians won the last match-up in 1998. The Canadians won in the 2000 Olympics, the last competitive game between the two teams.

1 September 2019
15:30

Boxscore

Canada	92–108	Australia
Scoring by quarter: 20–29, 20–23, 37–24, 15–32
Pts: Birch 18; Rebs: Ejim 6 Asts: Pangos 8		Pts: Dellavedova 24; Rebs: Bogut 9 Asts: Ingles 10

Dongfeng Nissan Cultural and Sports Centre, Dongguan
Attendance: 10,830
Referees: Jorge Vázquez (PUR), Alexis Mercado (PUR), Gentian Cici (ALB)

=== Senegal vs. Lithuania ===
This was the first competitive game between Senegal and Lithuania.

1 September 2019
19:30

Boxscore

Senegal	47–101	Lithuania
Scoring by quarter: 10–27, 11–21, 12–29, 14–24
Pts: three players 8 Rebs: M. Faye 5 Asts: M. Faye 4		Pts: three players 13; Rebs: Valančiūnas 11; Asts: Kalnietis 8

Dongfeng Nissan Cultural and Sports Centre, Dongguan
Attendance: 7,908
Referees: Saverio Lanzarini (ITA), Leandro Zalazar (ARG), Martin Horozov (BUL)

=== Australia vs. Senegal ===
This was the first game between Australia and Senegal in the World Cup. The Australians won in the 1980 Olympics, the last competitive game between the two teams.

3 September 2019
15:30

Boxscore

Australia	81–68	Senegal
Scoring by quarter: 18–16, 18–17, 24–17, 21–18
Pts: Mills 22; Rebs: Ingles 10; Asts: Ingles 9		Pts: Dalmeida 14; Rebs: Ndoye 10; Asts: Dalmeida 4

Dongfeng Nissan Cultural and Sports Centre, Dongguan
Attendance: 4,600
Referees: Jorge Vázquez (PUR), Leandro Zalazar (ARG), Carlos Peralta (ECU)

=== Lithuania vs. Canada ===
This was the second game between Lithuania and Canada in the World Cup. The Lithuanians won the first match-up in 2010, the last competitive game between the two teams.

3 September 2019
19:30

Boxscore

Lithuania	92–69	Canada
Scoring by quarter: 24–14, 22–22, 24–18, 22–15
Pts: Ulanovas 15; Rebs: Sabonis, Valančiūnas 8 Asts: Kalnietis 6		Pts: Wiltjer 24; Rebs: three players 4 Asts: Pangos 8

Dongfeng Nissan Cultural and Sports Centre, Dongguan
Attendance: 7,701
Referees: Gentian Cici (ALB), Martin Horozov (BUL), Saverio Lanzarini (ITA)

=== Canada vs. Senegal ===
This was the third game between Canada and Senegal in the World Cup. The Canadians won the last match-up in 1998. The Canadians also won in the 2016 FIBA World Olympic Qualifying Tournament, the last competitive game between the two teams.

5 September 2019
15:30

Boxscore

Canada	82–60	Senegal
Scoring by quarter: 11–22, 22–10, 26–14, 23–14
Pts: Joseph 24; Rebs: Birch 10; Asts: Pangos 5		Pts: M. Faye 14; Rebs: Ndour 12; Asts: Dalmeida 7

Dongfeng Nissan Cultural and Sports Centre, Dongguan
Attendance: 4,569
Referees: Saverio Lanzarini (ITA), Martin Horozov (BUL), Carlos Peralta (ECU)

=== Lithuania vs. Australia ===
This was the fourth game between Lithuania and Australia in the World Cup. The Australians won the last match-up in 2014. The Australians also won in the 2016 Olympics, the last competitive game between the two teams.

5 September 2019
19:30

Boxscore

Lithuania	82–87	Australia
Scoring by quarter: 19–27, 22–25, 19–16, 22–19
Pts: Grigonis 19; Rebs: Valančiūnas 7 Asts: Sabonis 4		Pts: Mills 23; Rebs: Baynes 13; Asts: Ingles 8

Dongfeng Nissan Cultural and Sports Centre, Dongguan
Attendance: 9,831
Referees: Jorge Vázquez (PUR), Leandro Zalazar (ARG), Alexis Mercado (PUR)
