= 2019 FIBA Basketball World Cup Group B =

Group Stage of 2019 FIBA Basketball World Cup

Group B was one of eight groups of the preliminary round of the 2019 FIBA Basketball World Cup. It took place from 31 August to 4 September 2019, and consisted of Argentina, Nigeria, Russia, and South Korea. Each team played each other once, for a total of three games per team, with all games played at Wuhan Sports Center Gymnasium, Wuhan. After all of the games were played, the top two teams with the best records qualified for the Second round and the bottom two teams played in the Classification Round.

== Teams ==
Team	Qualification		Appearance			Best performance	FIBA World Ranking
Team	As	Date	Last	Total	Streak	Best performance	FIBA World Ranking
Russia	European Second Round Group K Top 3	24 February 2019	2010	5	1	Runners-up (1994, 1998)	10
Argentina	Americas Second Round Group E Top 3	2 December 2018	2014	14	9	Champions (1950)	5
South Korea	Asian Second Round Group E Top 3	2 December 2018	2014	8	2	11th place (1970)	32
Nigeria	African Second Round Group F Top 2	15 September 2018	2006	4	1	13th place (1998)	33

== Standings ==
Pos	Team	Pld	W	L	PF	PA	PD	Pts	Qualification
1	Argentina	3	3	0	258	211	+47	6	Second round
2	Russia	3	2	1	230	219	+11	5	Second round
3	Nigeria	3	1	2	266	242	+24	4	17th–32nd classification
4	South Korea	3	0	3	208	290	−82	3	17th–32nd classification

Source: FIBA
Rules for classification: Tiebreakers

== Games ==
All times are local (UTC+8).

=== Russia vs. Nigeria ===
This was the first meeting between Russia and Nigeria in the World Cup. The Russians won against Nigeria in the 2012 FIBA World Olympic Qualifying Tournament for Men, the last competitive game between the two teams.

31 August 2019
16:30

Boxscore

Russia	82–77	Nigeria
Scoring by quarter: 18–13, 22–22, 18–23, 24–19
Pts: Kulagin 16; Rebs: Kurbanov 7 Asts: Fridzon, Zubkov 4		Pts: Okogie 18; Rebs: Metu 6 Asts: Okogie 4

Wuhan Sports Center Gymnasium, Wuhan
Attendance: 4,888
Referees: Omar Bermúdez (MEX), Takaki Kato (JPN), Ahmed Al-Shuwaili (IRQ)

=== Argentina vs. South Korea ===
This was the second game between Argentina and South Korea in the World Cup, with the Argentinians winning the first matchup in 1994. Argentina also won their last competitive game against South Korea in the 1996 Olympics.

31 August 2019
20:30

Boxscore

Argentina	95–69	South Korea
Scoring by quarter: 22–11, 21–17, 28–16, 24–25
Pts: Laprovíttola 17; Rebs: Scola 9 Asts: Campazzo 6		Pts: Ra Gun-ah 31; Rebs: Ra Gun-ah 15; Asts: Lee 7

Wuhan Sports Center Gymnasium, Wuhan
Attendance: 5,486
Referees: Cristiano Maranho (BRA), Zdenko Tomašovič (SVK), Carsten Straube (GER)

=== Nigeria vs. Argentina ===
This was the third game between Nigeria and Argentina in the World Cup. Argentina won the two prior meetings, and also won its last competitive game against the Nigerians at the 2016 Olympics.

2 September 2019
16:30

Boxscore

Nigeria	81–94	Argentina
Scoring by quarter: 17–28, 26–15, 18–29, 20–22
Pts: Okogie 18; Rebs: Aminu 8 Asts: Okogie 5		Pts: Scola 23; Rebs: Scola 10; Asts: Campazzo 8

Wuhan Sports Center Gymnasium, Wuhan
Attendance: 3,000
Referees: Cristiano Maranho (BRA), Takaki Kato (JPN), Ahmed Al-Shuwaili (IRQ)

=== South Korea vs. Russia ===
This was the first game between South Korea and Russia in the World Cup. The Russians won against South Korea in the 2012 FIBA World Olympic Qualifying Tournament for Men, the last competitive match between the two teams.

2 September 2019
20:30

Boxscore

South Korea	73–87	Russia
Scoring by quarter: 18–27, 19–13, 12–23, 24–24
Pts: Ra Gun-ah 19; Rebs: Ra Gun-ah 10; Asts: Lee 5		Pts: Fridzon, Vorontsevich 13; Rebs: Kurbanov, Vorontsevich 7 Asts: Kurbanov 9

Wuhan Sports Center Gymnasium, Wuhan
Attendance: 2,537
Referees: Omar Bermúdez (MEX), Zdenko Tomašovič (SVK), Markos Michaelides (SUI)

=== South Korea vs. Nigeria ===
This was the first competitive game between South Korea and Nigeria.

4 September 2019
16:30

Boxscore

South Korea	66–108	Nigeria
Scoring by quarter: 15–17, 16–32, 19–30, 16–29
Pts: Ra Gun-ah 18; Rebs: Ra Gun-ah 11; Asts: Lee, Park 4		Pts: Eric 17; Rebs: Eric, Metu 9 Asts: Iroegbu 6

Wuhan Sports Center Gymnasium, Wuhan
Attendance: 4,047
Referees: Omar Bermúdez (MEX), Carsten Straube (GER), Markos Michaelides (SUI)

=== Russia vs. Argentina ===
This was the fourth game between Russia and Argentina in the World Cup. The Russians won their last competitive game against Argentina, in the 2012 Olympics.

4 September 2019
20:30

Boxscore

Russia	61–69	Argentina
Scoring by quarter: 17–12, 16–27, 7–14, 21–16
Pts: Zubkov 18; Rebs: Vorontsevich, Zubkov 7 Asts: Sopin 4		Pts: Campazzo 21; Rebs: Scola 9 Asts: Campazzo 7

Wuhan Sports Center Gymnasium, Wuhan
Attendance: 7,155
Referees: Cristiano Maranho (BRA), Zdenko Tomašovič (SVK), Takaki Kato (JPN)
