= 2019 FIBA Basketball World Cup Group A =

Basketball tournament group stage

Group A was one of eight groups of the preliminary round of the 2019 FIBA Basketball World Cup. It took place from 31 August to 4 September 2019, and consisted of China, Ivory Coast, Poland, and Venezuela. Each team played each other once, for a total of three games per team, with all games played at Wukesong Arena, Beijing. After all of the games were played, the top two teams with the best records qualified for the Second round and the bottom two teams played in the Classification Round.

== Teams ==
Team	Qualification		Appearance			Best performance	FIBA World Ranking
Team	As	Date	Last	Total	Streak	Best performance	FIBA World Ranking
Ivory Coast	African Best third placed team	24 February 2019	2010	4	1	13th place (1982, 1986)	64
Poland	European Second Round Group J Top 3	22 February 2019	1967	2	1	5th place (1967)	25
Venezuela	Americas Second Round Group F Top 3	2 December 2018	2006	4	1	11th place (1990)	20
China	Host nation	7 August 2015	2010	9	1	8th place (1994)	30

== Standings ==
Pos	Team	Pld	W	L	PF	PA	PD	Pts	Qualification
1	Poland	3	3	0	239	208	+31	6	Second round
2	Venezuela	3	2	1	228	210	+18	5	Second round
3	China (H)	3	1	2	205	206	−1	4	17th–32nd classification
4	Ivory Coast	3	0	3	189	237	−48	3	17th–32nd classification

Source: FIBA
Rules for classification: Tiebreakers
(H) Hosts

== Games ==
All times are local (UTC+8).

=== Poland vs. Venezuela ===
This was the first competitive game between Poland and Venezuela.

31 August 2019
16:00

Boxscore

Poland	80–69	Venezuela
Scoring by quarter: 22–24, 22–12, 16–15, 20–18
Pts: Sokołowski 16; Rebs: Hrycaniuk 10; Asts: Slaughter 5		Pts: Chourio 15; Rebs: Ruiz 10; Asts: Guillent 8

Wukesong Arena, Beijing
Attendance: 9,072
Referees: Matthew Kallio (CAN), Matthew Myers (USA), Nicolas Fernandes (TAH)

=== Ivory Coast vs. China ===
This was the fourth meeting between the Ivory Coast and China in the World Cup. The Chinese won the three prior meetings, including their 2010 matchup, which was the most recent game.

31 August 2019
20:00

Boxscore

Ivory Coast	55–70	China
Scoring by quarter: 16–14, 13–15, 12–22, 14–19
Pts: Edi 10; Rebs: Koné, Thompson 8 Asts: Diabate, Pamba 3		Pts: Yi 19; Rebs: Yi, Zhai 8 Asts: Guo 8

Wukesong Arena, Beijing
Attendance: 11,976
Referees: Yener Yılmaz (TUR), Boris Krejič (SLO), Harja Jaladri (INA)

=== Venezuela vs. Ivory Coast ===
This was the first competitive game between Venezuela and the Ivory Coast.

2 September 2019
16:00

Boxscore

Venezuela	87–71	Ivory Coast
Scoring by quarter: 26–17, 23–15, 24–24, 14–15
Pts: Guillent 31; Rebs: Ruiz 8 Asts: Guillent 7		Pts: Abouo 16; Rebs: Pamba 6 Asts: Diabate, Fofana 4

Wukesong Arena, Beijing
Attendance: 6,951
Referees: Matthew Myers (USA), Yener Yılmaz (TUR), Harja Jaladri (INA)

=== China vs. Poland ===
This was the first competitive game between China and Poland.

2 September 2019
20:00

Boxscore

China	76–79 (OT)	Poland
Scoring by quarter: 25–15, 10–24, 19–18, 18–15, Overtime: 4–7
Pts: Yi 24; Rebs: Wang 9 Asts: Guo, Zhao J. 4		Pts: Ponitka 25; Rebs: Ponitka 9 Asts: Slaughter 4

Wukesong Arena, Beijing
Attendance: 12,546
Referees: Matthew Kallio (CAN), Boris Krejič (SLO), Ahmed Abaakil (MAR)

=== Ivory Coast vs. Poland ===
This was the first competitive match between the Ivory Coast and Poland.

4 September 2019
16:00

Boxscore

Ivory Coast	63–80	Poland
Scoring by quarter: 24–20, 8–16, 17–19, 14–25
Pts: Abouo 23; Rebs: Abouo, Thompson 6 Asts: Diabate 6		Pts: Waczyński 16; Rebs: Kulig 7 Asts: Waczyński 6

Wukesong Arena, Beijing
Attendance: 8,745
Referees: Matthew Kallio (CAN), Nicolas Fernandes (TAH), Samir Abaakil (MAR)

=== Venezuela vs. China ===
This was the second meeting between Venezuela and China in the World Cup. The Venezuelans won their first meeting in 1990. The Venezuelans also won their last competitive game against the Chinese, in the 2016 Olympics.

4 September 2019
20:00

Boxscore

Venezuela	72–59	China
Scoring by quarter: 18–10, 15–13, 18–18, 21–18
Pts: Guillent 15; Rebs: Colmenares, Ruiz 7 Asts: Guillent 8		Pts: Fang 13; Rebs: Yi 8 Asts: Zhao J. 4

Wukesong Arena, Beijing
Attendance: 12,224
Referees: Yener Yılmaz (TUR), Matthew Myers (USA), Boris Krejič (SLO)
