= 2019 FIBA Basketball World Cup Group F =

Basketball tournament group stage

Group F was one of eight groups of the preliminary round of the 2019 FIBA Basketball World Cup. It took place from 1 to 5 September 2019, and consisted of Brazil, Greece, Montenegro, and New Zealand. Each team played each other once, for a total of three games per team, with all games played at Nanjing Youth Olympic Sports Park Gymnasium, Nanjing. After all of the games were played, the top two teams with the best records qualified for the Second round and the bottom two teams played in the Classification Round.

== Teams ==
Team	Qualification		Appearance			Best performance	FIBA World Ranking
Team	As	Date	Last	Total	Streak	Best performance	FIBA World Ranking
Greece	European Second Round Group L Top 3	16 September 2018	2014	8	4	Runners-up (2006)	8
New Zealand	Asian Second Round Group E Top 3	1 December 2018	2014	6	5	4th place (2002)	38
Brazil	Americas Second Round Group F Top 3	21 February 2019	2014	18	18	Champions (1959, 1963)	12
Montenegro	European Second Round Group I Top 3	25 February 2019	N/A	1	1	Debut	28

== Standings ==
Pos	Team	Pld	W	L	PF	PA	PD	Pts	Qualification
1	Brazil	3	3	0	265	245	+20	6	Second round
2	Greece	3	2	1	266	236	+30	5	Second round
3	New Zealand	3	1	2	284	288	−4	4	17th–32nd classification
4	Montenegro	3	0	3	216	262	−46	3	17th–32nd classification

Source: FIBA
Rules for classification: Tiebreakers

== Games ==
All times are local (UTC+8).

=== New Zealand vs. Brazil ===
This was the first competitive game between New Zealand and Brazil.

1 September 2019
16:00

Boxscore

New Zealand	94–102	Brazil
Scoring by quarter: 20–21, 30–29, 12–28, 32–24
Pts: C. Webster 19; Rebs: Loe 10; Asts: Ili 6		Pts: Barbosa 22; Rebs: Felício 13; Asts: Luz 6

Nanjing Youth Olympic Sports Park Gymnasium, Nanjing
Attendance: 6,700
Referees: Antonio Conde (ESP), Leandro Lezcano (ARG), Hwang In-tae (KOR)

=== Greece vs. Montenegro ===
This was the first game between Greece and Montenegro in the World Cup. The Greeks won in EuroBasket 2011, which was the last competitive game between the two teams.

1 September 2019
20:00

Boxscore

Greece	85–60	Montenegro
Scoring by quarter: 17–9, 25–7, 21–22, 22–22
Pts: Printezis 16; Rebs: Papagiannis 9 Asts: Calathes 7		Pts: Vučević 12; Rebs: Dubljević 5 Asts: Ivanović 5

Nanjing Youth Olympic Sports Park Gymnasium, Nanjing
Attendance: 12,286
Referees: Roberto Vázquez (PUR), Andrés Bartel (URU), Sergiy Zashchuk (UKR)

=== Montenegro vs. New Zealand ===
This was the first competitive game between Montenegro and New Zealand.

3 September 2019
16:00

Boxscore

Montenegro	83–93	New Zealand
Scoring by quarter: 26–31, 18–22, 21–13, 18–27
Pts: Ivanović 18; Rebs: Dubljević 13; Asts: Ivanović 7		Pts: C. Webster 25; Rebs: Fotu 7 Asts: C. Webster 7

Nanjing Youth Olympic Sports Park Gymnasium, Nanjing
Attendance: 4,208
Referees: Leandro Lezcano (ARG), Michał Proc (POL), Roberto Vázquez (PUR)

=== Brazil vs. Greece ===
This was the fifth game between Brazil and Greece in the World Cup. The Greeks won in 2006, which was the last competitive game between the two teams.

3 September 2019
20:00

Boxscore

Brazil	79–78	Greece
Scoring by quarter: 15–19, 15–21, 26–13, 23–25
Pts: Varejão 22; Rebs: Caboclo 10; Asts: Garcia, Luz 6		Pts: Printezis 20; Rebs: Calathes 7 Asts: Sloukas 11

Nanjing Youth Olympic Sports Park Gymnasium, Nanjing
Attendance: 12,845
Referees: Antonio Conde (ESP), Hwang In-tae (KOR), Sergiy Zashchuk (UKR)

=== Brazil vs. Montenegro ===
This was the first competitive game between Brazil and Montenegro.

5 September 2019
16:00

Boxscore

Brazil	84–73	Montenegro
Scoring by quarter: 19–20, 24–18, 23–16, 18–19
Pts: Huertas 16; Rebs: Caboclo, Felício 7 Asts: Huertas 6		Pts: Needham 16; Rebs: Radončić, Vučević 6 Asts: Needham 10

Nanjing Youth Olympic Sports Park Gymnasium, Nanjing
Attendance: 3,950
Referees: Antonio Conde (ESP), Andrés Bartel (URU), Michał Proc (POL)

=== Greece vs. New Zealand ===
This was the first game between Greece and New Zealand in the World Cup. The Greeks won in the 2008 FIBA World Olympic Qualifying Tournament for Men, which was the last competitive game between the two teams.

5 September 2019
20:00

Boxscore

Greece	103–97	New Zealand
Scoring by quarter: 28–19, 23–25, 20–22, 32–31
Pts: G. Antetokounmpo 24; Rebs: G. Antetokounmpo 10; Asts: Sloukas 7		Pts: C. Webster 31; Rebs: Abercrombie, Loe 6 Asts: Ili 9

Nanjing Youth Olympic Sports Park Gymnasium, Nanjing
Attendance: 11,113
Referees: Roberto Vázquez (PUR), Leandro Lezcano (ARG), Hwang In-tae (KOR)
