= 2019 FIBA Basketball World Cup Group E =

Basketball tournament group stage

Group E was one of eight groups of the preliminary round of the 2019 FIBA Basketball World Cup. It took place from 1 to 5 September 2019, and consisted of the Czech Republic, Japan, Turkey, and the United States. Each team played each other once, for a total of three games per team, with all games played at Shanghai Oriental Sports Center, Shanghai. After all of the games were played, the top two teams with the best records qualified for the Second round and the bottom two teams played in the Classification Round.

== Teams ==
Team	Qualification		Appearance			Best performance	FIBA World Ranking
Team	As	Date	Last	Total	Streak	Best performance	FIBA World Ranking
Turkey	European Second Round Group I Top 3	2 December 2018	2014	5	5	Runners-up (2010)	17
Czech Republic	European Second Round Group K Top 3	16 September 2018	N/A	1	1	Debut	24
United States	Americas Second Round Group E Top 3	2 December 2018	2014	18	18	Champions (1954, 1986, 1994, 2010, 2014)	1
Japan	Asian Second Round Group F Top 4	24 February 2019	2006	5	1	11th place (1967)	48

== Standings ==
Pos	Team	Pld	W	L	PF	PA	PD	Pts	Qualification
1	United States	3	3	0	279	204	+75	6	Second round
2	Czech Republic	3	2	1	247	240	+7	5	Second round
3	Turkey	3	1	2	254	251	+3	4	17th–32nd classification
4	Japan	3	0	3	188	273	−85	3	17th–32nd classification

Source: FIBA
Rules for classification: Tiebreakers

== Games ==
All times are local (UTC+8).

=== Turkey vs. Japan ===
This was the first competitive game between Turkey and Japan.

1 September 2019
16:30

Boxscore

Turkey	86–67	Japan
Scoring by quarter: 28–12, 19–23, 20–14, 19–18
Pts: Mahmutoğlu 17; Rebs: İlyasova 9 Asts: Balbay 8		Pts: Fazekas, Hachimura 15; Rebs: Hachimura 7 Asts: Baba 4

Shanghai Oriental Sports Center, Shanghai
Attendance: 16,000
Referees: Aleksandar Glišić (SRB), Ferdinand Pascual (PHI), Andris Aunkrogers (LAT)

=== Czech Republic vs. United States ===
This was the first competitive game between the Czech Republic and the United States.

1 September 2019
20:30

Boxscore

Czech Republic	67–88	United States
Scoring by quarter: 14–17, 15–26, 19–23, 19–22
Pts: Satoranský 17; Rebs: Bohačík 9 Asts: Satoranský 5		Pts: Mitchell 16; Rebs: Turner 7 Asts: Walker 4

Shanghai Oriental Sports Center, Shanghai
Attendance: 17,800
Referees: Manuel Mazzoni (ITA), Wojciech Liszka (POL), Duan Zhu (CHN)

=== Japan vs. Czech Republic ===
This was the first competitive game between Japan and the Czech Republic.

3 September 2019
16:30

Boxscore

Japan	76–89	Czech Republic
Scoring by quarter: 18–18, 22–27, 15–19, 21–25
Pts: Hachimura 21; Rebs: Fazekas 10; Asts: Hachimura, Shinoyama 4		Pts: Bohačík, Schilb 22; Rebs: Balvín 8 Asts: Satoransky 7

Shanghai Oriental Sports Center, Shanghai
Attendance: 13,100
Referees: Manuel Mazzoni (ITA), Andris Aunkrogers (LAT), Kim Jong-kuk (KOR)

=== United States vs. Turkey ===
This was the third game between the United States and Turkey, with the Americans winning the prior two meetings, including in 2014, which was the last competitive game between the two teams.

3 September 2019
20:30

Boxscore

United States	93–92 (OT)	Turkey
Scoring by quarter: 26–21, 21–21, 18–19, 16–20, Overtime: 12–11
Pts: Middleton 15; Rebs: Tatum 11; Asts: Walker 7		Pts: İlyasova 23; Rebs: İlyasova 14; Asts: Osman 4

Shanghai Oriental Sports Center, Shanghai
Attendance: 18,000
Referees: Aleksandar Glišić (SRB), Ferdinand Pascual (PHI), Wojciech Liszka (POL)

=== Turkey vs. Czech Republic ===
This was the first game between Turkey and the Czech Republic in the World Cup. The Turks won in EuroBasket 2007, which was the last competitive game between the two teams.

5 September 2019
16:30

Boxscore

Turkey	76–91	Czech Republic
Scoring by quarter: 16–22, 19–21, 25–23, 16–25
Pts: Osman 24; Rebs: three players 4 Asts: four players 3		Pts: Hruban 18; Rebs: Balvín 11; Asts: Schilb 8

Shanghai Oriental Sports Center, Shanghai
Attendance: 11,400
Referees: Aleksandar Glišić (SRB), Ferdinand Pascual (PHI), Wojciech Liszka (POL)

=== United States vs. Japan ===
This was the first game between the United States and Japan in the World Cup. The Americans won in the 1972 Olympics, which was the last competitive game between the two teams.

5 September 2019
20:30

Boxscore

United States	98–45	Japan
Scoring by quarter: 23–9, 33–14, 28–8, 14–14
Pts: Brown 20; Rebs: Turner 9 Asts: Walker 8		Pts: Baba 18; Rebs: Takeuchi 6 Asts: Watanabe 2

Shanghai Oriental Sports Center, Shanghai
Attendance: 18,000
Referees: Manuel Mazzoni (ITA), Andris Aunkrogers (LAT), Duan Zhu (CHN)
