= Behnam Yakhchali =

Iranian basketball player (born 1994)

No. 8 – Gladiators Treves
- Position: Guard
- League: ProA

Personal information
- Born: 12 July 1995 (age 31) Shahrekord, Iran
- Listed height: 6 ft 3 in (1.91 m)
- Listed weight: 192 lb (87 kg)

Career information
- Playing career: 2010–present

Career history
- 2010–2011: Heyat Basketball Shahrekord
- 2011–2012: Jahesh Tarabar Qom
- 2012–2019: Petrochimi Bandar Imam
- 2019–2020: Nanjing Monkey Kings
- 2020: Shahrdari Gorgan
- 2020–2021: Rostock Seawolves
- 2021–2022: Mitteldeutscher
- 2022–2023: Shahrdari Gorgan
- 2023–present: Gladiators Treves
Medals
Men's basketball
Representing Iran
Asian Championship
Silver medal – second place	2017 Beirut
Bronze medal – third place	2015 Changsha
Asian Games
Silver medal – second place	2014 Incheon	Team
Silver medal – second place	2018 Jakarta	Team
FIBA Asia Challenge
Gold medal – first place	2012 Japan
Gold medal – first place	2014 China
Gold medal – first place	2016 Tehran

Behnam Yakhchali Dehkordi (Persian: بهنام یخچالی دهکردی, born 12 July 1995) is an Iranian professional basketball player for the Gladiators Trier of the Basketball Bundesliga. He has played for the Iranian national basketball team.

== Personal life ==
On 31 January 2026, Yakhchali withdrew from the national team in response to the authorities' handling of the 2025–2026 Iranian protests, saying on his Instagram: "Until the people feel better and their hearts calm down, I have decided to stay with them and not be on the national team.".
