= Bank of Dongguan Basketball Center =

Basketball venue in Dongguan, China

Dongguan Basketball Centre
- Bank of Dongguan Basketball Centre
- Interactive map of Dongguan Basketball Centre
- Location: Dongguan, China
- Coordinates: 22.99889°N 113.83490°E
- Owner: City of Dongguan
- Operator: Dongguan Dongshihong Co., Ltd.
- Capacity: 16,133
- Surface: Parquet
- Public transit: GH Liaobu

Construction
- Groundbreaking: 28 September 2009
- Built: 2009–2013
- Opened: 31 August 2014
- Cost: ¥710 million
- Architect: Gerkan, Marg and Partners

Tenant
- Guangdong Southern Tigers (CBA) (2015–present)

Website
- Official Website

The Dongguan Basketball Centre (Chinese: 东莞篮球中心), also referred as Bank of Dongguan Basketball Centre (Chinese: 东莞银行篮球中心) for sponsorship reasons, is an indoor arena located in Dongguan, China. It is used mostly for basketball matches and concerts. Guangdong Southern Tigers of the Chinese Basketball Association are the tenants.

Dongguan Basketball Center opened on 31 August 2014. Yao Ming's Yao Foundation Charity Game 2014, contested by Tony Parker, Shane Battier, Carl Landry, Troy Daniels, Wang Zhelin, Guo Ailun and Zhou Peng, was held as the opening match. It was renamed Dongfeng Nissan Cultural and Sports Center on the same day when Dongfeng Nissan acquired the naming rights to the center. Guangdong Southern Tigers of Chinese Basketball Association had played at the Dongfeng Nissan Center since the 2014–15 CBA playoffs. Dongfeng Nissan Cultural and Sports Center also hold 2015 Sudirman Cup between 10 and 17 May 2015. In November 2019, the sponsorship rights of the arena has replaced by Bank of Dongguan.

== See also ==
- Chinese Basketball Association
- Dalang Arena
- Dongguan Arena
- Guangdong Southern Tigers
