= Georgios Poursanidis =

Greek international basketball referee

- Γεώργιος Πουρσανίδης
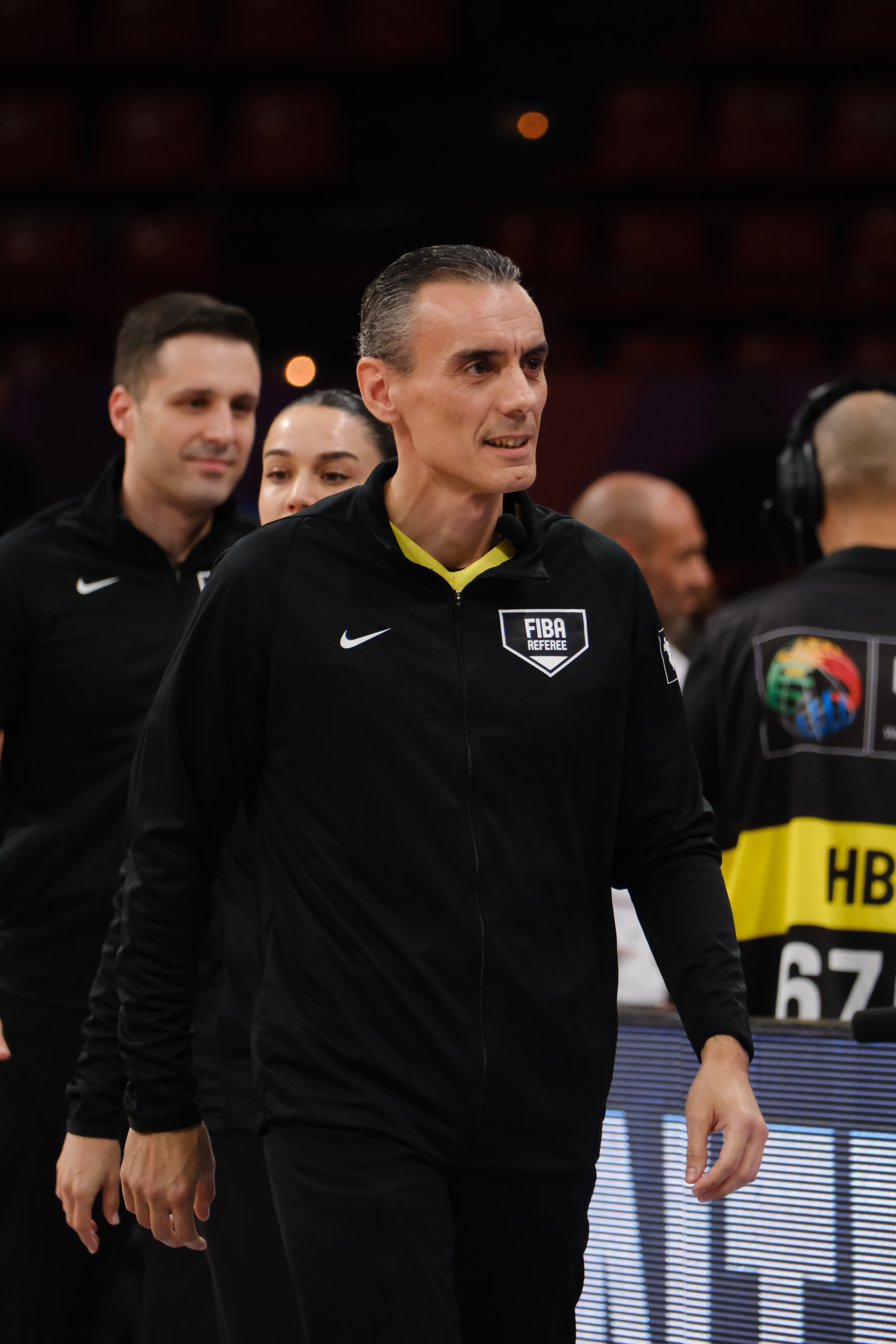
- Born: Greece
- Occupation: Basketball referee

Georgios Poursanidis (Greek: Γεώργιος Πουρσανίδης) is a Greek basketball referee who has officiated in major international competitions organized by FIBA, and is considered one of the top basketball referees in Greece.

== Career ==
Poursanidis began his career in domestic competitions under the Hellenic Basketball Federation. His proficiency in officiating led to his certification by FIBA, the sport’s global governing body.

He has officiated at the FIBA Basketball World Cup 2019, which was hosted across China, as the only Greek referee selected among 56 international officials. He was also the only Greek referee at EuroBasket 2022, one of 44 referees across Europe assigned to the event.

In 2023, he officiated again at the FIBA World Cup (also known as MundoBasket 2023), hosted in the Philippines, Japan, and Indonesia. In 2025, Poursanidis was selected by FIBA as one of 45 referees for FIBA EuroBasket 2025, continuing his streak of international assignments.

Additionally, he was one of 32 referees selected for the FIBA EuroBasket Women 2025, hosted in Czechia, Germany, Italy, and Greece. The final phase was held at the Peace and Friendship Stadium (SEF) in Athens, and he officiated as the first-ranked official in the semifinal game, Belgium vs. Italy.
