= Luis Castillo (basketball referee) =

Spanish basketball referee (born 1980)

Luis Miguel Castillo Larroca
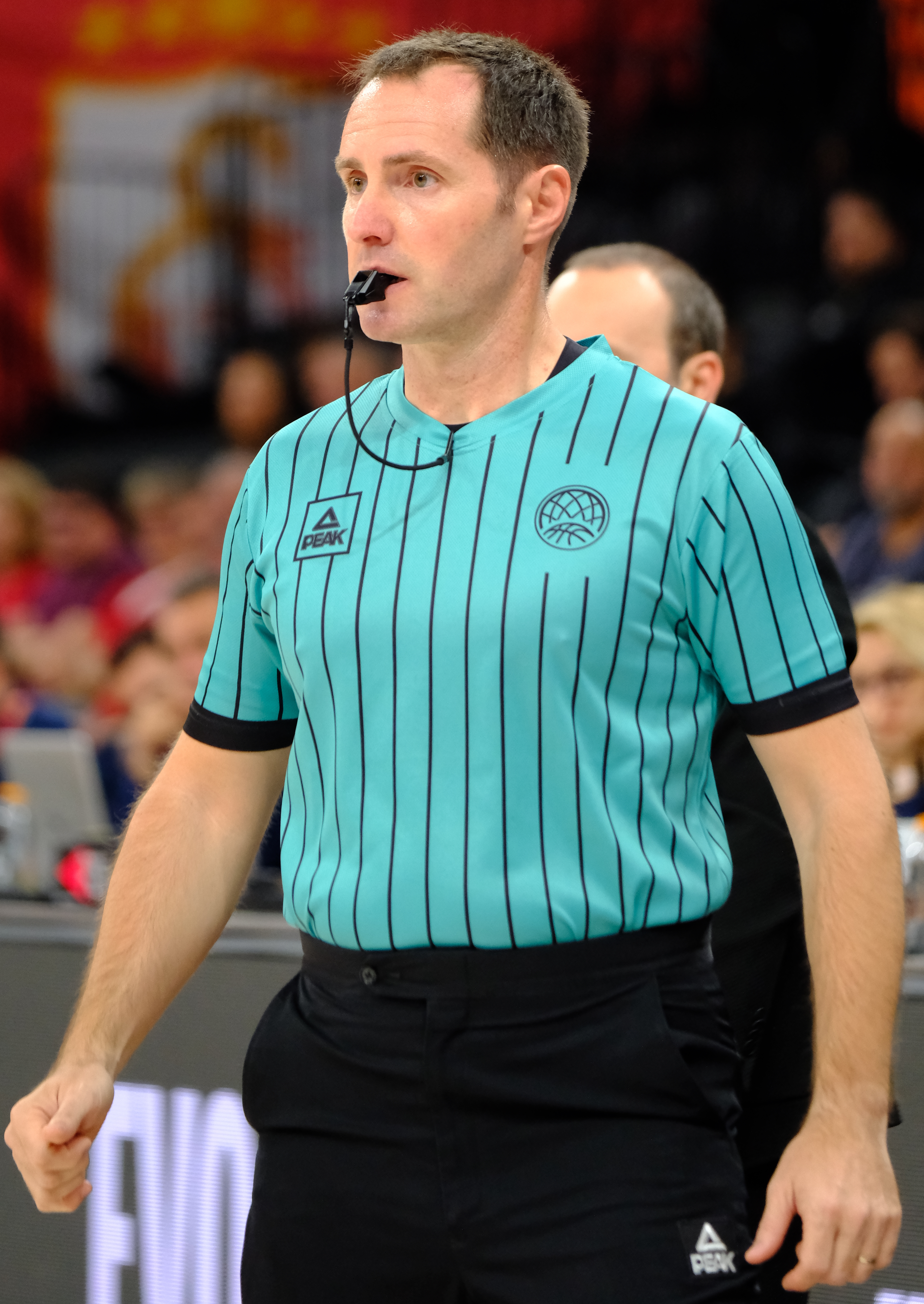

Personal information
- Born: 31 October 1980 (age 46) Murcia, Spain

Luis Miguel Castillo Larroca (born 31 October 1980), commonly known as Luis Castillo or Luismi Castillo, is a Spanish professional basketball referee who officiates in the Spanish Liga ACB and at international FIBA competitions, such as FIBA World Cup and EuroBasket.

He is a member of the Referees Committee of the Region of Murcia and has served as one of the regular referees in ACB league fixtures for more than a decade.

== Biography ==
Castillo was born in Murcia, Spain.

He progressed through the Spanish refereeing system and made his debut in the Liga ACB (Spain's top professional division) in the 2007–08 season.

Castillo obtained his FIBA international referee licence in 2015 after successfully completing the FIBA clinic for referees, becoming one of Spain's FIBA-listed officials.

He has been appointed by FIBA to officiate at multiple international competitions and events. Notable international appointments and selections include:

- Inclusion on FIBA's long list of referees for the Paris 2024 Olympic basketball tournaments.
- Selection as one of the referees for FIBA EuroBasket 2025.
- Appointments to FIBA tournaments and events (including World Cup referee panels and FIBA-sanctioned qualifying and invitational tournaments).

He has also been involved in FIBA pre-Olympic and World Cup qualifying tournaments and other international assignments, representing Spain among the pool of elite European referees selected by FIBA for major championships.

== Recognition ==
- Honourable mention for Sporting Merit, Region of Murcia (2019).
