= Takaki Kato =

Japanese basketball referee (born 1988)

Personal information
- Born: 30 June 1988 (age 38) Anjō, Aichi, Japan

Takaki Kato (Japanese: 加藤 誉樹, born 30 June 1988) is a Japanese international basketball referee, who became Japan's first professional referee in 2017 and has worked at multiple international tournaments including the Olympic Games, the World Cup, the Paris 2024 Olympic basketball tournament, and the FIBA Asia Cup.

== Career ==
Kato earned his FIBA referee license in 2014 and debuted professionally in Japan's B.League in 2016–17. In September 2017, he became Japan's first-ever professional referee, marking a significant milestone in the country's refereeing system.

In Japan, he has won the B.League's “Best Referee Award” for nine consecutive seasons (2016–17 through 2024–25).

Internationally, Kato officiated at the Tokyo 2020 Olympic Games (held in 2021), the 2023 FIBA Basketball World Cup, he was included in the "Long List of referees" for the Paris 2024 Olympics, and he officiated at the FIBA Asia Cup 2025 in Jeddah, participating in group and knockout stages.

== Recognition ==
His notable refereeing assisgments include:

- B.League Best Referee Award – nine seasons (2016–17 to 2024–25).
- Tokyo 2020 Olympic Basketball Tournament – official referee.
- 2023 FIBA World Cup – officiated key matches.
- Selected among referees in contention for Paris 2024 Olympics.
- FIBA Asia Cup 2025 – appointed for both group and playoff games.
