= 2019 Italy FIBA Basketball World Cup team =

Italy
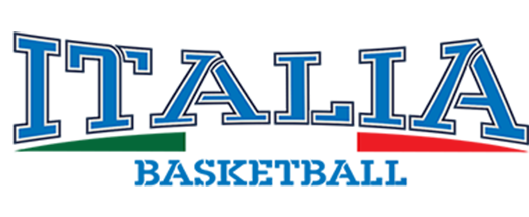
- Chairman: Giovanni Petrucci
- Head coach: Romeo Sacchetti
- Preliminary round: 2nd
- Second round: 3rd
- Final standing: 10th
- PIR leader: Danilo Gallinari 20
- Scoring leader: Danilo Gallinari 17
- Rebounding leader: Danilo Gallinari 6
- Assists leader: Marco Belinelli 3
- Highest home attendance: 15,000 vs Serbia (4 September 2019)
- Lowest home attendance: 2,849 vs Spain (6 September 2019)
- Biggest win: 108–62 Philippines (31 August 2019)
- Biggest defeat: 77-92 Serbia (4 September 2019)
Home	Away
- All statistics correct as of September 8, 2019.

The 2019 Italy FIBA Basketball World Cup team represents Italy at the 2019 FIBA Basketball World Cup in China. Italy qualified for the World Cup by taking the 2nd place in the European Second Round Group J. The team has been coached by Romeo Sacchetti.

The 2019 FIBA Basketball World Cup is the 18th tournament of the FIBA Basketball World Cup championship that is organized by FIBA.

== Background ==
The 2019 FIBA Basketball World Cup represents the 18th edition of the FIBA Basketball World Cup where for the first time 32 teams from all over the world compete in the tournament. Italy has not qualified since the 2006 edition in Japan where it reached the playoffs. This year, with coach Sacchetti, the Italian national team aims to achieve at least the Olimpics qualifying tournament, which means qualify to the second round of World Cup.

== Timeline ==
- 22 February 2019: Italy gains mathematical qualification to the world cup after winning against Hungary 75-41.
- 16 March 2019: World Cup 2019 Draw: Italy is in group D together with Angola, Philippines and Serbia.
- 1 July 2019: Submitted the 24 players long list preliminary convocation.
- 12 July 2019: Submitted 19 players convocation for the summer preparation (Polonara, Pascolo, Flaccadori, Tonut and Moretti will not join the team for the World Cup preparation).
- 22 July 2019: Start of the training camp.
- 30 July 2019 - 26 August 2019: Friendly games.
- 30 July 2019 - 31 July 2019: Trentino Basket Cup.
- 8 August 2019 - 10 August 2019: Verona Basketball Cup.
- 11 August 2019: 16 men roster cut (Cinciarini, M. Vitali and Moraschini leave the team).
- 13 August 2019: Melli will not be part of the team due to a knee surgery.
- 16 August 2019 - 18 August 2019: Acropolis Basketball Tournament.
- 17 August 2019: 14 men cut (Aradori leaves the team).
- 23 August 2019 - 27 August 2019: Austiger Cup.
- 29 August 2019: Final roster announced.
- 31 August 2019 - 15 September 2019: 2019 FIBA Basketball World Cup

== Kit ==
Supplier: Spalding / Sponsor: Barilla

Home	Away

== Qualification ==
=== First round ===
Pos	Team	Pld	W	L	PF	PA	PD	Pts	Qualification
1	Italy	6	4	2	474	405	+69	10	Advance to the second round
2	Netherlands	6	3	3	434	416	+18	9 (Note: Netherlands 1–1, +3; Croatia 1–1, –3)	Advance to the second round
3	Croatia	6	3	3	431	419	+12	9	Advance to the second round
4	Romania	6	2	4	368	467	−99	8	Relegated to the EuroBasket Pre-Qualifiers second round

Source: FIBA
Rules for classification: 1) Points; 2) Head-to-head results; 3) Points difference; 4) Points scored.

==== Matches ====
24 November 2017	Italy	75–70	Romania	Turin, Italy
20:15 (CET)	Scoring by quarter: 26-15, 16-13, 17-15, 16-27
	Pts: Della Valle, Aradori 16; Rebs: Gentile, Biligha 6 Asts: Filloy 4 PIR: Aradori, Filloy 12	Boxscore	Pts: Cățe 16; Rebs: Cățe 8 Asts: Watson 5 PIR: Cățe 25	Arena: PalaRuffini; Attendance: 5,000; Referees: Nicolas Maestre (FRA), Haris Bijedic (BIH), Uros Nikolic (SER)

26 November 2017	Croatia	64–80	Italy	Zagreb, Croatia attendance = 5,000
18:00 (CET)	Scoring by quarter: 23-15, 9-20, 15-25, 17-20
	Pts: Planinić 20; Rebs: Planinić 10; Asts: Mavra 4 PIR: Planinić 22	Boxscore	Pts: Della Valle 25; Rebs: Gentile, Abass 5 Asts: Filloy 4 PIR: Della Valle 25	Arena: Dražen Petrović Basketball Hall; Referees: Vicente Bulto (ESP), Panagiotis Anastopoulos (GRE), Yener Yilmaz (TUR)

23 February 2018	Italy	80–62	Netherlands	Treviso, Italy
20:15 (CET)	Scoring by quarter: 26-13, 19-21, 18-14, 17-14
	Pts: Della Valle 22; Rebs: Burns 7 Asts: Filloy 6 PIR: Della Valle 22	Boxscore	Pts: Schaftenaar 17; Rebs: Kloof 9 Asts: De Jong 4 PIR: Schaftenaar 17	Arena: Palaverde; Attendance: 5,300; Referees: Tanel Suslov (EST), Luis Castillo (ESP), Sebastien Clivaz (SUI)

26 February 2018	Romania	50–101	Italy	Cluj-Napoca, Romania
19:45 (CET)	'Scoring by quarter: 12-35, 13-12, 11-29, 14-25
	Pts: Cățe 15; Rebs: Cățe 8 Asts: Mandache, Kuti 4 PIR: Cățe 23	Boxscore	Pts: Della Valle 29; Rebs: Burns 8 Asts: Filloy 6 PIR: Della Valle 28	Arena: BT Arena; Attendance: 5,370; Referees: Antonio Conde (ESP), Sergiy Chebyshev (UKR), Marko Vladic (AUT)

28 June 2018	Italy	72–78	Croatia	Trieste, Italy
20:45 (CET)	Scoring by quarter: 24-21, 15-20, 13-24, 20-13
	Pts: Aradori 15; Rebs: Burns 6 Asts: Vitali, Burns 3 PIR: Burns 19	Boxscore	Pts: Bogdanović 26; Rebs: Šarić 9 Asts: Bogdanović 26; PIR: Bogdanović 28	Arena: PalaTrieste; Attendance: 5,500; Referees: Vicente Bulto (ESP), Georgios Poursanidis (GRE), Tanel Suslov (EST)

1 July 2018	Netherlands	81–66	Italy	Groningen, Netherlands
18:00 (CET)	Scoring by quarter: 19-15, 19-15, 20-19, 23-17
	Pts: Kloof 21; Rebs: Hammink 8 Asts: Kloof 3 PIR: Hammink 23	Boxscore	Pts: Abass 18; Rebs: Abass, Sacchetti 5 Asts: Burns 2 PIR: Abass 20	Arena: MartiniPlaza; Referees: Sergiy Zashchuk (UKR), Zdravko Rutesic (MNE), Arnis Ozols (LAT)

=== Second round ===
Pos	Team	Pld	W	L	PF	PA	PD	Pts	Qualification
1	Lithuania	12	11	1	999	802	+197	23	Qualification to the FIBA Basketball World Cup
2	Italy	12	8	4	940	836	+104	20 (Note: Italy 1–1, +3 PD; Poland 1–1, –3 PD)	Qualification to the FIBA Basketball World Cup
3	Poland	12	8	4	958	886	+72	20	Qualification to the FIBA Basketball World Cup
4	Hungary	12	6	6	836	849	−13	18	Qualification to the EuroBasket Qualifiers
5	Croatia	12	4	8	858	891	−33	16	Qualification to the EuroBasket Qualifiers
6	Netherlands	12	3	9	895	944	−49	15	Qualification to the EuroBasket Qualifiers

Source: FIBA
Rules for classification: 1) Points; 2) Head-to-head results; 3) Points difference; 4) Points scored.

==== Matches ====
14 September 2018	Italy	101–82	Poland	Bologna
20:15	Scoring by quarter: 25–25, 29–27, 19–13, 28–17
	Pts: Della Valle 28; Rebs: Melli 6 Asts: Vitali 6	Boxscore	Pts: Slaughter 28; Rebs: Cel 6 Asts: Ponitka 3	Arena: PalaDozza; Attendance: 5,000; Referees: Aleksandar Glišić (SRB), Sasa Maričić (SRB), Andris Aunkrogers (LAT)

17 September 2018	Hungary	63–69	Italy	Debrecen
18:00	Scoring by quarter: 14–20, 14–19, 23–13, 12–17
	Pts: Vojvoda 25; Rebs: Golomán 7 Asts: Govens 4	Boxscore	Pts: Datome 18; Rebs: Brooks, Datome 7 Asts: Vitali 7	Arena: Főnix Hall; Attendance: 5,652; Referees: Ademir Zurapović (BIH), Nicolas Maestre (FRA), Oskars Lucis (LAT)

29 November 2018	Italy	70–65	Lithuania	Brescia
20:15	Scoring by quarter: 20–24, 22–11, 11–18, 17–12
	Pts: Awudu 13; Rebs: Aradori, Polonara 7 Asts: Vitali 8	Boxscore	Pts: Kalnietis 15; Rebs: Mačiulis 10; Asts: Kalnietis 6	Arena: PalaLeonessa; Attendance: 5,000; Referees: Panagiotis Anastopoulos (GRE), Radomir Vojinović (MNE), Steve Bittner (GER)

2 December 2018	Poland	94–78	Italy	Gdańsk
20:15	Scoring by quarter: 31–18, 21–23, 21–24, 21–13
	Pts: Lampe 22; Rebs: Lampe 8 Asts: Slaughter 11	Boxscore	Pts: Abass, Aradori 13; Rebs: three players 4 Asts: Vitali 4	Arena: Ergo Arena; Attendance: 4,957; Referees: Gentian Cici (ALB), Boris Krejić (SLO), Saša Maričić (SRB)

22 February 2019	Italy	75–41	Hungary	Varese
20:15	Scoring by quarter: 15–9, 19–6, 18–18, 23–8
	Pts: Della Valle 15; Rebs: Brooks 8 Asts: Vitali 4	Boxscore	Pts: Vojvoda 15; Rebs: Eilingsfeld 6 Asts: Eilingsfeld 2	Arena: Palasport Lino Oldrini; Attendance: 5,000; Referees: Antonio Conde (ESP), Fernando Calatrava (ESP), Carsten Straube (GER)

25 February 2019	Lithuania	86–73	Italy	Klaipėda
19:30	Scoring by quarter: 26–16, 21–13, 14–22, 25–22
	Pts: Masiulis 15; Rebs: Giedraitis 7 Asts: Janavičius, Vasiliauskas 5	Boxscore	Pts: Vitali 22; Rebs: Vitali 4 Asts: Filloy 6	Arena: Švyturio Arena; Attendance: 5,500; Referees: Aleksandar Glišić (SRB), Kerem Baki (TUR), Zdenko Tomašovič (SVK)

== Roster ==
The final 12-man roster was announced on 29 August. Originally Nicolò Melli was included as well, but he was ruled out on the World Cup because of his knee surgery.

Italy national basketball team – 2019 FIBA Basketball World Cup roster
Players
Coaches

Pos.	No.	Name	Age – Date of birth	Height	Club	Ctr.
SG	00	Amedeo Della Valle	26 – 11 April 1993	1.94 m (6 ft 4 in)	Olimpia Milano	(Italy)
SG	3	Marco Belinelli	33 – 25 March 1986	1.96 m (6 ft 5 in)	San Antonio Spurs	(United States)
SF	5	Alessandro Gentile	26 – 12 November 1992	2.00 m (6 ft 7 in)	Estudiantes	(Spain)
C	6	Paul Biligha	29 – 31 May 1990	2.00 m (6 ft 7 in)	Reyer Venezia	(Italy)
PG	7	Luca Vitali	33 – 9 May 1986	2.01 m (6 ft 7 in)	Brescia Leonessa	(Italy)
PF	8	Danilo Gallinari	31 – 8 August 1988	2.08 m (6 ft 10 in)	Los Angeles Clippers	(United States)
SG	10	Daniel Hackett	31 – 19 December 1987	1.98 m (6 ft 6 in)	CSKA Moscow	(Russia)
PG	12	Ariel Filloy	32 – 11 March 1987	1.90 m (6 ft 3 in)	Scandone Avellino	(Italy)
PF	15	Jeff Brooks	30 – 12 June 1989	2.03 m (6 ft 8 in)	Olimpia Milano	(Italy)
C	16	Amedeo Tessitori	24 – 7 October 1994	2.08 m (6 ft 10 in)	Universo Treviso Basket	(Italy)
SF	23	Awudu Abass	26 – 27 January 1993	2.00 m (6 ft 7 in)	Brescia Leonessa	(Italy)
SF	70	Luigi Datome (C)	31 – 23 November 1987	2.03 m (6 ft 8 in)	Fenerbahçe	(Turkey)

Head coach

- (Italy) Romeo Sacchetti

Assistant coach(es)

- (Italy) Lele Molin
- (Italy) Massimo Maffezzoli
- (Italy) Paolo Conti

Legend

- (C) Team captain
- Club – describes last
  club before the tournament
- Age – describes age
  on 31 August 2019

The teams are referred to the season 2018–19.

=== Depth chart ===
Pos.	Starting 5	Bench 1	Bench 2
C	Paul Biligha	Amedeo Tessitori
PF	Danilo Gallinari	Jeff Brooks
SF	Luigi Datome	Alessandro Gentile	Awudu Abass
SG	Marco Belinelli	Amedeo Della Valle
PG	Daniel Hackett	Luca Vitali	Ariel Filloy

=== Candidate players ===
The following were candidates to make the team:

Earlier candidates
Player	Team	Added	Removed	Reason
Achille Polonara	(Italy) Dinamo Sassari	July 1, 2019	July 12, 2019	19-man roster cut
Davide Pascolo	(Italy) Aquila Trento	July 1, 2019	July 12, 2019	19-man roster cut
Diego Flaccadori	(Italy) Aquila Trento	July 1, 2019	July 12, 2019	19-man roster cut
Stefano Tonut	(Italy) Reyer Venezia	July 1, 2019	July 12, 2019	19-man roster cut
Davide Moretti	(United States) Texas Tech Red Raiders	July 1, 2019	July 12, 2019	19-man roster cut
Andrea Cinciarini	(Italy) Olimpia Milano	July 1, 2019	August 11, 2019	16-man roster cut
Michele Vitali	(Italy) Dinamo Sassari	July 1, 2019	August 11, 2019	16-man roster cut
Riccardo Moraschini	(Italy) Olimpia Milano	July 1, 2019	August 11, 2019	16-man roster cut
Nicolò Melli	(United States) New Orleans Pelicans	July 1, 2019	August 13, 2019	Injured
Pietro Aradori	(Italy) Fortitudo Bologna	July 1, 2019	August 17, 2019	14-men roster cut
Brian Sacchetti	(Italy) Brescia Leonessa	July 1, 2019	August 29, 2019	12-men roster cut
Giampaolo Ricci	(Italy) Virtus Bologna	July 1, 2019	August 29, 2019	12-men roster cut

== Staff ==
Position	Staff member	Age	Team
Head coach	Romeo Sacchetti	66	Vanoli Cremona
Assistant coaches	Emanuele Molin	59	Aquila Trento
Assistant coaches	Massimo Maffezzoli	43	Sidigas Avellino
Assistant coaches	Paolo Conti	49	Pallacanestro Varese
Physical trainer	Matteo Panichi	46	Italian Basketball Federation
Physician	Sandro Senzameno	67	Italian Basketball Federation
Orthopaedic	Raffaele Cortina	59	Italian Basketball Federation
Osteopath	Roberto Oggioni	44	Italian Basketball Federation
Osteopath	Francesco Ciallella	39	Italian Basketball Federation
Team manager	Massimo Valle	53	Italian Basketball Federation
Manager	Roberto Brunamonti	60	Italian Basketball Federation
Video maker	Marco Cremonini	31	Italian Basketball Federation
Warehouse manager	Curzio Garofoli	49	Italian Basketball Federation
Warehouse manager	Andrea Annessa	45	Italian Basketball Federation

Age – describes age on 31 August 2019

== Exhibition games ==
=== Trentino Basket cup ===
Four teams took part in the Trentino Basket Cup: Ivory Coast and Italy, that were preparing for the World Cup. While Romania and Switzerland were preparing for the Eurobasket 2021.

30 July 2019 Semifinals	Italy	88–60	Romania	Trento, Italy
20:30 (CET)	Scoring by quarter: 25-12, 19-19, 22-16, 22-13
	Pts: Gentile 14; Rebs: Gentile 9 Asts: Cinciarini 4	Boxscore	Pts: Cățe, Nicolescu 12; Rebs: Cățe 8 Asts: Cățe 4	Arena: PalaTrento; Attendance: 1496; Referees: Vicino, Quarta, Brindisi

31 July 2019 Finals	Italy	69–58	Ivory Coast	Trento, Italy
20:30 (CET)	Scoring by quarter: 28-13, 15-15, 13-16, 13-14
	Pts: Gentile 14; Rebs: Brooks 11; Asts: Hackett 4	Boxscore	Pts: Fofana 10; Rebs: Fofana 6	Arena: PalaTrento; Attendance: 1389; Referees: Filippini, Vicino, Dori

=== Verona Basketball Cup ===
All the four team playing at the Verona Basketball Cup have been qualified for the World Cup: Italy, Russia, Senegal and Venezuela. The tournament is played in a round robin Format and the Russian team won the competition.

8 August 2019
Venezuela	54 –69	Russia
Italy	111– 54	Senegal
9 August 2019
Senegal	75– 69	Venezuela
Italy	70 –72	Russia
10 August 2019
Russia	73– 56	Senegal
Italy	72– 54	Venezuela

Pos	Team	Pld	W	L	GF	GA	GD	Pts
1	Russia	3	3	0	214	180	+34	6
2	Italy	3	2	1	253	180	+73	5
3	Senegal	3	1	2	185	253	−68	4
4	Venezuela	3	0	3	177	216	−39	3

Updated to match(es) played on August 11, 2019. Source: FIP

8 August 2019 Match 1	Italy	111–54	Senegal	Verona, Italy
20:30 (CET)	Scoring by quarter: 31-10, 24-16, 30-15, 26-13
	Pts: Aradori, M.Vitali 15; Rebs: Della Valle 5 Asts: Della Valle 5	Boxscore	Pts: Toure 15; Rebs: N'Doye 7 Asts: Adams 3	Arena: PalaOlimpia; Attendance: 2000; Referees: Mazzoni, Boninsegna, Borgo

9 August 2019 Match 2	Italy	70–72	Russia	Verona, Italy
20:30 (CET)	Scoring by quarter: 22-7, 18-25, 25-21, 5-19
	Pts: Gentile, Sacchetti 13; Rebs: Biligha 7 Asts: Filloy 3	Boxscore	Pts: Fridzon, Kurbanov 16; Rebs: Andrey Vorontsevich 6 Asts: Andrey Vorontsevich 3	Arena: PalaOlimpia; Attendance: 5000; Referees: Lanzarini, Begnis, Mazzoni

10 August 2019 Match 3	Italy	72–54	Venezuela	Verona, Italy
20:30 (CET)	Scoring by quarter: 20-14, 18-14, 15-10, 19-16
	Pts: Abass 16; Rebs: Della Valle, L. Vitali 5 Asts: L. Vitali 5	Boxscore	Pts: Colmenares 12; Rebs: G. Vargas, Ruiz 6 Asts: Mijares 6	Arena: PalaOlimpia; Attendance: 2500; Referees: Borgo, Lanzarini, Sardella

=== Acropolis Cup ===
The tournament is scheduled to be held from 16 to 18 August in Athens, Greece.

16 August 2019 Game 1	Greece	83–63	Italy	Athens, Greece
20:30 (CET)	Scoring by quarter: 27-13, 22-15, 16-19, 18-16
	Pts: G. Antetokounmpo 18; Rebs: Bourousis 17; Asts: Calathes 7 PIR: G. Antetokounmpo 21	Boxscore	Pts: Belinelli 13; Rebs: Biligha, Hackett 8 Asts: Vitali 4 PIR: Biligha 17	Arena: Olympic Indoor Hall; Attendance: not available Referees: Koromilas, Papapetrou, Andrikopoulos

17 August 2019 Game 2	Italy	64–96	Serbia	Athens, Greece
18:00 (CET)	Scoring by quarter: 15-14, 17-31, 17-24, 15-27
	Pts: Belinelli 16; Rebs: Tessitori 5 Asts: Biligha, Vitali 3 PIR: Gentile 9	Boxscore	Pts: Jokić 20; Rebs: Bjelica, Marjanović 7 Asts: Micić 5 PIR: Jokić 24	Arena: Olympic Indoor Hall; Attendance: not available Referees: Schinas, Tsaroucha, Kardaris

18 August 2019 Game 3	Turkey	72–70	Italy	Athens, Greece
18:00 (CET)	Scoring by quarter: 12-19, 26-16, 10-26, 24-9
	Pts: Osman 20; Rebs: İlyasova 11; Asts: Wilbekin 4 PIR: Osman 22	Boxscore	Pts: Gentile 26; Rebs: Brooks 9 Asts: Belinelli 4 PIR: Gentile 32	Arena: Olympic Indoor Hall; Attendance: not available Referees: Karakatsounis, Somos, Zacharis

=== AusTiger Cup ===
The tournament is scheduled to be held from 23 to 27 August in Shenyang, China.

23 August 2019 Match 1	Serbia	71–65	Italy	Shenyang, China
20:30 (UTC+8)	Scoring by quarter: 27-17, 20-17, 12-14, 12-17
	Pts: Bogdanović 15; Rebs: Milutinov 7 Asts: Micić 3	Boxscore	Pts: Belinelli 18; Rebs: Gallinari, Abass 6 Asts: Hackett 3	Arena: Liaoning Gymnasium; Attendance: 2000

25 August 2019 Match 2	Italy	80–82	France	Shenyang, China
(UTC+8)	Scoring by quarter: 18-20, 20-19, 19-26, 23-17
	Pts: Belinelli 20; Rebs: Tessitori 7 Asts: Datome, Hackett 3	Boxscore	Pts: Fournier 29; Rebs: Batum 5 Asts: Okobo 4	Arena: Liaoning Gymnasium; Attendance: 1500; Referees: (Serbia) Sasa Maricic, (China) Xin Geng Wei, (New Zealand) Martin Davison

26 August 2019 Match 3	Italy	82–88	New Zealand	Anshan, China
(UTC+8)	Scoring by quarter: 14–26, 23–20, 24–18, 21-24
	Pts: Gallinari 22; Rebs: Brooks 8 Asts: Vitali, Gallinari 2	Boxscore	Pts: C. Webster 21; Rebs: Fotu, Loe 6 Asts: C. Webster, T. Webster 6	Arena: Anshan Olympic Sports Center Gymnasium; Attendance: 2000; Referees: (Serbia) Sasa Maricic, (China) Xing Jin Ming, (France) Nicolas Maestre

== Tournament ==
=== Preliminary round ===
Italy was drawn into Group D with Angola, Philippines, and the Serbia and will play all of its group phase matches in Foshan at the Foshan International Sports and Cultural Center from 31 August to 4 September.

Pos	Team	Pld	W	L	PF	PA	PD	Pts	Qualification
1	Serbia	3	3	0	323	203	+120	6	Second round
2	Italy	3	2	1	277	215	+62	5	Second round
3	Angola	3	1	2	204	278	−74	4	17th–32nd classification
4	Philippines	3	0	3	210	318	−108	3	17th–32nd classification

Source: FIBA
Rules for classification: Tiebreakers

All times are local (UTC+8).

==== Philippines vs. Italy ====
This will be the second game between the Philippines and Italy in the World Cup. The Italians won the first meeting in 1978, which was also the last competitive game between the two teams.

31 August 2019
19:30

Boxscore

Philippines	62–108	Italy
Scoring by quarter: 8–37, 16–25, 15–23, 23–23
Pts: Blatche, Perez 15; Rebs: Blatche 10; Asts: Perez 3		Pts: Datome, Della Valle 17; Rebs: Tessitori 8 Asts: Vitali 5

Foshan International Sports and Cultural Center, Foshan
Attendance: 10,500
Referees: Steve Anderson (USA), Yohan Rosso (FRA), Yu Jung (TPE)

Starters:			Pts	Reb	Ast
PG	14	Mark Barroca	2	1	0
SG	16	Roger Pogoy	2	0	0
SF	5	Gabe Norwood	0	1	1
PF	25	Japeth Aguilar	2	4	0
C	1	Andray Blatche	15	10	2
Reserves:					
PG	3	Paul Lee	2	1	1
PG	4	Kiefer Ravena	5	2	0
SG	8	Robert Bolick	6	2	1
C	15	June Mar Fajardo	9	6	1
SG	17	CJ Perez	15	2	3
SF	18	Troy Rosario	2	2	1
PF	20	Raymond Almazan	2	1	0
Head coach:
(Philippines) Yeng Guiao

Philippines	Italy

Philippines	Statistics	Italy
22/41 (54%)	2-pt field goals	24/36 (67%)
3/23 (13%)	3-pt field goals	15/31 (48%)
9/12 (75%)	Free throws	15/21 (71%)
13	Offensive rebounds	10
21	Defensive rebounds	28
34	Total rebounds	38
10	Assists	30
23	Turnovers	13
5	Steals	13
1	Blocks	3
22	Fouls	16

Starters:			Pts	Reb	Ast
PG	10	Daniel Hackett	7	4	4
SG	3	Marco Belinelli	9	3	4
SF	70	Luigi Datome	17	3	2
PF	8	Danilo Gallinari	16	3	4
C	6	Paul Biligha	8	3	0
Reserves:					
SG	00	Amedeo Della Valle	17	4	3
SF	5	Alessandro Gentile	6	1	2
PG	7	Luca Vitali	2	0	5
PG	12	Ariel Filloy	7	1	2
PF	15	Jeff Brooks	8	4	1
C	16	Amedeo Tessitori	9	8	1
SF	23	Awudu Abass	2	0	1
Head coach:
(Italy) Romeo Sacchetti

- Top Performer: Danilo Gallinari

==== Italy vs. Angola ====
This will be the second game between Angola and Serbia in the World Cup. The Italians won the first meeting in 1990, which was also the last competitive game between the two teams.

2 September 2019
15:30

Boxscore

Italy	92–61	Angola
Scoring by quarter: 25–11, 19–10, 26–21, 22–19
Pts: Belinelli 17; Rebs: Brooks 11; Asts: Hackett 3		Pts: Moreira 15; Rebs: Moreira 8 Asts: Morais 2

Foshan International Sports and Cultural Center, Foshan
Attendance: 5,000
Referees: Steven Anderson (USA), Mārtiņš Kozlovskis (LAT), Yevgeniy Mikheyev (KAZ)

Starters:			Pts	Reb	Ast
PG	10	Daniel Hackett	11	5	3
SG	3	Marco Belinelli	17	5	1
SF	70	Luigi Datome	8	1	2
PF	8	Danilo Gallinari	7	6	2
C	6	Paul Biligha	3	0	0
Reserves:					
SG	00	Amedeo Della Valle	8	1	0
SF	5	Alessandro Gentile	8	5	2
PG	7	Luca Vitali	0	0	1
PG	12	Ariel Filloy	0	2	2
PF	15	Jeff Brooks	11	11	2
C	16	Amedeo Tessitori	8	2	1
SF	23	Awudu Abass	11	3	0
Head coach:
(Italy) Romeo Sacchetti

Italy	Angola

Italy	Statistics	Angola
21/36 (58%)	2-pt field goals	23/47 (38%)
12/30 (40%)	3-pt field goals	2/18 (11%)
14/22 (64%)	Free throws	9/15 (60%)
12	Offensive rebounds	12
30	Defensive rebounds	23
42	Total rebounds	35
16	Assists	6
13	Turnovers	16
10	Steals	6
7	Blocks	1
17	Fouls	20

Starters:			Pts	Reb	Ast
PG	1	Gerson Domingos	5	0	0
SG	6	Carlos Morais	10	3	2
SF	10	José Antonio	4	3	1
PF	23	Reggie Moore	0	2	1
C	2	Yanick Moreira	15	8	0
Reserves:					
SG	3	Jerson Gonçalves	3	2	0
SF	4	Olímpio Cipriano	4	0	1
PF	9	Leonel Paulo	12	3	0
PF	15	Eduardo Mingas	2	5	1
C	16	Hermenegildo Mbunga	DNP		
C	32	Valdelício Joaquim	6	4	0
PG	37	Jacques Conceição	DNP		
Head coach:
(United States) Will Voigt

- Top Performer: Jeff Brooks

==== Italy vs. Serbia ====
This will be the first game between Italy and Serbia in the World Cup. Serbia won in its last competitive game against Italy, in EuroBasket 2017.

4 September 2019
19:30

Boxscore

Italy	77–92	Serbia
Scoring by quarter: 23–28, 19–22, 15–20, 20–22
Pts: Gallinari 26; Rebs: Gallinari 8 Asts: Belinelli 4		Pts: Bogdanović 31; Rebs: Bjelica 7 Asts: Bjelica 9

Foshan International Sports and Cultural Center, Foshan
Attendance: 15,000
Referees: Steve Anderson (USA), Yohan Rosso (FRA), Yu Jung (TPE)

Starters:			Pts	Reb	Ast
PG	10	Daniel Hackett	13	3	1
SG	3	Marco Belinelli	15	2	4
SF	70	Luigi Datome	5	4	3
PF	8	Danilo Gallinari	26	8	1
C	6	Paul Biligha	0	2	0
Reserves:					
SG	00	Amedeo Della Valle	0	0	0
SF	5	Alessandro Gentile	11	1	1
PG	7	Luca Vitali	0	0	0
PG	12	Ariel Filloy	DNP		
PF	15	Jeff Brooks	2	2	0
C	16	Amedeo Tessitori	0	0	0
SF	23	Awudu Abass	5	1	1
Head coach:
(Italy) Romeo Sacchetti

Italy

Serbia

Italy	Statistics	Serbia
11/25 (44%)	2-pt field goals	17/35 (49%)
11/26 (42%)	3-pt field goals	10/24 (42%)
22/30 (70%)	Free throws	28/34 (82%)
8	Offensive rebounds	13
19	Defensive rebounds	22
27	Total rebounds	35
11	Assists	24
17	Turnovers	15
7	Steals	9
0	Blocks	2
26	Fouls	30

Starters:			Pts	Reb	Ast
PG	24	Stefan Jović	11	6	3
SG	7	Bogdan Bogdanović	31	4	5
SF	11	Vladimir Lučić	2	1	1
PF	14	Stefan Birčević	0	0	0
C	21	Nikola Milutinov	4	0	0
Reserves:					
SF	5	Marko Simonović	0	1	0
F	8	Nemanja Bjelica	5	7	9
C	13	Miroslav Raduljica	12	2	1
PF	15	Nikola Jokić	15	6	4
PG	22	Vasilije Micić	6	0	0
SG	23	Marko Gudurić	0	2	1
C	51	Boban Marjanović	6	1	0
Head coach:
(Serbia) Aleksandar Đorđević

- Top Performer: Bogdan Bogdanović

=== Second round ===
Italy finished second in the preliminary group and advanced to the second round of the FIBA Basketball World Cup. It will play against two top finishers of Group C, Spain and Puerto Rico, in Wuhan.

Pos	Team	Pld	W	L	PF	PA	PD	Pts	Qualification
1	Spain	5	5	0	395	319	+76	10	Quarter-finals
2	Serbia	5	4	1	482	331	+151	9	Quarter-finals
3	Italy	5	3	2	431	371	+60	8	
4	Puerto Rico	5	2	3	349	402	−53	7	

Source: FIBA
Rules for classification: Tiebreakers

All times are local UTC+8.

==== Spain vs. Italy ====
6 September 2019
20:30

Boxscore

Spain	67–60	Italy
Scoring by quarter: 18–18, 12–13, 20–17, 17–12
Pts: J. Hernangómez 16; Rebs: Claver 9 Asts: Fernández 5		Pts: Gallinari 15; Rebs: Hackett 8 Asts: Belinelli 4

Wuhan Sports Center Gymnasium, Wuhan
Attendance: 2,849
Referees: Steve Anderson (USA), Guilherme Locatelli (BRA), Omar Bermúdez (MEX)

Starters:			Pts	Reb	Ast
PG	9	Ricky Rubio	15	2	2
SG	5	Rudy Fernández	5	5	5
SF	10	Víctor Claver	7	9	0
PF	41	Juan Hernangómez	16	4	0
C	13	Marc Gasol	2	4	1
Reserves:					
PG	1	Quino Colom	DNP		
SG	8	Pau Ribas	5	4	1
C	14	Willy Hernangómez	4	7	0
PF	18	Pierre Oriola	2	2	0
SF	22	Xavi Rabaseda	DNP		
SG	23	Sergio Llull	11	2	3
SF	33	Javier Beirán	DNP		
Head coach:
(Italy) Sergio Scariolo

Spain	Italy

Spain	Statistics	Italy
18/38 (47%)	2-pt field goals	19/45 (42%)
6/23 (26%)	3-pt field goals	4/20 (20%)
13/27 (76%)	Free throws	10/15 (67%)
10	Offensive rebounds	10
33	Defensive rebounds	26
43	Total rebounds	36
12	Assists	11
15	Turnovers	10
7	Steals	5
2	Blocks	2
22	Fouls	16

Starters:			Pts	Reb	Ast
PG	10	Daniel Hackett	5	8	2
SG	3	Marco Belinelli	7	4	4
SF	70	Luigi Datome	12	3	1
PF	8	Danilo Gallinari	15	5	2
C	6	Paul Biligha	6	5	0
Reserves:					
SG	00	Amedeo Della Valle	6	1	1
SF	5	Alessandro Gentile	7	4	1
PG	7	Luca Vitali	0	0	0
PG	12	Ariel Filloy	DNP		
PF	15	Jeff Brooks	1	2	0
C	16	Amedeo Tessitori	1	0	0
SF	23	Awudu Abass	DNP		
Head coach:
(Italy) Romeo Sacchetti

- Top Performer: Danilo Gallinari

==== Puerto Rico vs. Italy ====
8 September 2019
16:30

Boxscore

Puerto Rico	89–94 (OT)	Italy
Scoring by quarter: 24–13, 22–13, 18–24, 19–33, Overtime: 6–11
Pts: Balkman 14; Rebs: Clemente 9 Asts: Rodríguez 5		Pts: Belinelli 27; Rebs: Abass 8 Asts: Gallinari 5

Wuhan Sports Center Gymnasium, Wuhan
Attendance: 4,264
Referees: Guilherme Locatelli (BRA), Zdenko Tomašovič (SVK), Mārtiņš Kozlovskis (LAT)

Starters:			Pts	Reb	Ast
PG	9	Gary Browne	13	6	3
SG	33	David Huertas	11	2	1
SF	0	Isaiah Pineiro	6	3	2
PF	34	Renaldo Balkman	14	7	1
C	12	Jorge Díaz	3	2	0
Reserves:					
PF	9	Ramón Clemente	9	9	0
PF	7	Devon Collier	7	7	1
PG	13	Ángel Rodríguez	13	4	5
G	24	Gian Clavell	6	0	1
G/F	42	Alex Franklin	7	3	0
C	43	Chris Brady	0	0	0
G	44	Javier Mojica	0	1	0
Head coach:
(Puerto Rico) Eddie Casiano

Puerto Rico	Italy

Puerto Rico	Statistics	Italy
29/61 (48%)	2-pt field goals	23/42 (55%)
5/24 (21%)	3-pt field goals	7/25 (28%)
16/22 (73%)	Free throws	27/36 (75%)
18	Offensive rebounds	7
31	Defensive rebounds	34
49	Total rebounds	41
14	Assists	23
17	Turnovers	15
9	Steals	7
0	Blocks	7
27	Fouls	20

Starters:			Pts	Reb	Ast
PG	10	Daniel Hackett	3	4	4
SG	3	Marco Belinelli	27	6	3
SF	23	Awudu Abass	14	8	1
PF	8	Danilo Gallinari	22	6	5
C	6	Paul Biligha	10	6	1
Reserves:					
SG	00	Amedeo Della Valle	0	0	2
SF	5	Alessandro Gentile	DNP		
PG	7	Luca Vitali	DNP		
PG	12	Ariel Filloy	6	3	4
PF	15	Jeff Brooks	0	2	2
C	16	Amedeo Tessitori	12	2	1
F	70	Luigi Datome	DNP		
Head coach:
(Italy) Romeo Sacchetti

- Top Performer: Marco Belinelli

== Statistics ==
=== Individual statistics ===
Player	GP	GS	MPG	FG%	3FG%	FT%	RPG	APG	SPG	BPG	EF	PPG
Awudu Abass	4	1	21.0	52.2% (3.0/5.8)	30.8% (1.0/3.2)	100% (1.0/1.0)	3.0	0.8	0.8	0.3	8.5	8.0
Marco Belinelli	5	5	29.0	30.0% (4.8/12.0)	33.3% (1.8/5.4)	72.0% (3.6/5.0)	4.0	3.2	1.2	0.0	13.2	15.0
Paul Biligha	5	5	19.2	57.1% (2.4/4.2)	(0.0/0.0)	37.5% (0.6/1.6)	3.2	0.2	0.8	0.6	7.0	5.4
Jeff Brooks	5	0	17.0	56.2% (1.8/3.2)	33.3% (0.4/1.2)	66.7% (0.4/0.6)	4.2	1.0	1.6	1.2	10.4	4.4
Luigi Datome	4	4	22.6	59.3% (4.0/6.8)	50.0% (1.5/3.0)	80.0% (1.0/1.2)	2.8	2.0	0.8	0.8	12.5	10.5
Amedeo Della Valle	5	0	10.6	38.5% (2.0/5.2)	29.4% (1.0/3.4)	100% (1.2/1.2)	1.2	1.2	0.6	0.0	5.0	6.2
Ariel Filloy	3	0	14.4	41.7% (1.7/4.0)	28.0% (0.7/2.3)	100% (0.3/0.3)	2.0	2.7	1.0	0.0	6.3	4.3
Danilo Gallinari	5	5	29.8	53.1% (5.2/9.8)	50.0% (2.4/4.8)	78.6% (4.4/5.6)	5.6	2.8	1.0	0.4	20.2	17.2
Alessandro Gentile	4	0	18.9	32.0% (2.0/6.2)	75.0% (0.8/1.0)	61.1% (2.8/4.5)	2.8	1.8	0.3	0.0	4.8	7.5
Daniel Hackett	5	5	24.3	31.2% (2.0/6.4)	31.6% (1.2/3.8)	65.0% (2.6/4.0)	4.8	2.8	1.2	0.0	8.2	7.8
Amedeo Tessitori	5	0	9.6	70.0% (2.8/4.0)	0.0% (0.0/0.2)	66.7% (0.8/1.2)	2.4	0.6	0.0	0.6	8.0	6.4
Luca Vitali	4	0	8.6	20.0% (0.2/1.2)	0.0% (0/0.5)	(0.0/0.0)	0.0	1.5	0.0	0.3	0.0	0.5
Total	4		200	47.0% (29.2/62.2)	39.3% (10.5/26.8)	69.3% (15.2/22.0)	35.8	17.0	8.8	3.0	93.3	84.3

Source: FIBA Basketball World Cup

Legend
GP	Games played	GS	Games started	MPG	Minutes per game
FG%	Field-goal percentage	3FG%	3-point field-goal percentage	FT%	Free-throw percentage
RPG	Rebounds per game	APG	Assists per game	SPG	Steals per game
BPG	Blocks per game	PPG	Points per game	EF	PIR per game

=== Statistical leaders ===
Updated: August 31, 2019

==== Individual game highs ====
Statistic	Name	Total	Opponent
Points	Marco Belinelli	27	Puerto Rico
Total Rebounds	Jeff Brooks	11	Angola
Assists	Luca Vitali; Danilo Gallinari	5	Philippines; Puerto Rico
Blocks	Jeff Brooks; Luigi Datome; Amedeo Tessitori	2	Philippines; Angola; Spain; Puerto Rico
Steals	Jeff Brooks	3	Serbia; Angola
Efficiency	Danilo Gallinari	27	Serbia
Field goal percentage^{1}	Danilo Gallinari; Jeff Brooks	83% (5/6)	Philippines; Angola
2-point field goal percentage^{1}	Amedeo Tessitori	100% (6/6)	Puerto Rico
3-point field goal percentage	Luigi Datome	100% (3/3)	Philippines
Free throw percentage	Amedeo Della Valle; Alessandro Gentile	100% (6/6)	Philippines; Serbia
Turnovers	Daniel Hackett	5	Serbia
Minutes	Marco Belinelli	40:09	Puerto Rico

- ^{1}– at least 5 attempts

Statistic	Name	Total	Opponent
Field goals made	Danilo Gallinari	8	Serbia
Field goals attempted	Marco Belinelli	17	Puerto Rico
2-point field goals made	Awudu Abass	6	Puerto Rico
2-point field goals attempted	Marco Belinelli	17	Puerto Rico
3-point field goals made	Danilo Gallinari	4	Philippines
3-point field goals attempted	Marco Belinelli	8	Puerto Rico
Free throws made	Marco Belinelli	10	Puerto Rico
Free throws attempted	Marco Belinelli	12	Puerto Rico
Offensive Rebounds	Jeff Brooks	5	Angola
Defensive Rebounds	Daniel Hackett	8	Spain
+/-	Danilo Gallinari	38	Philippines

==== Team game highs ====
Statistic	Total	Opponent
Points	108	Philippines
Total Rebounds	42	Angola
Assists	30	Philippines
Blocks	7	Angola; Puerto Rico
Steals	13	Philippines
Efficiency	141	Philippines
Field goal percentage	58.2% (39/67)	Philippines
2-point field goal percentage	66.7% (24/36)	Philippines
3-point field goal percentage	48.4% (15/31)	Philippines
Free throw percentage	75% (27/36)	Puerto Rico
Turnovers	17	Serbia

Statistic	Total	Opponent
Field goals made	39	Philippines
Field goals attempted	67	Philippines; Puerto Rico
2-point field goals made	24	Philippines
2-point field goals attempted	45	Spain
3-point field goals made	15	Philippines
3-point field goals attempted	31	Philippines
Free throws made	27	Puerto Rico
Free throws attempted	30	Serbia
Offensive Rebounds	12	Angola
Defensive Rebounds	34	Puerto Rico
+/-	46	Philippines

== Conclusion ==
Italy ended the championship at the 10th place overall, position that allows Italy the qualification to the Olympic qualifying tournament.
