= 2019 Philippines FIBA Basketball World Cup team =

Philippines
- Head coach: Yeng Guiao
- Preliminary round: Fourth place
- Classification round: Fourth place
- Scoring leader: Andray Blatche 15.8
- Rebounding leader: Andray Blatche 8.4
- Assists leader: Andray Blatche 3.4
- Biggest win: None
- Biggest defeat: 67–126 Serbia (2 September 2019)
Home	Away
- All statistics correct as of September 8, 2019.

The Philippines men's national basketball team competed in the 2019 FIBA Basketball World Cup which was held in China from August 31 to September 15, 2019. This is the Philippines second straight appearance in the FIBA Basketball World Cup since its participation in the 2014 edition hosted in Spain.

The team during the Asian qualifiers was initially coached by Chot Reyes and, later, Yeng Guiao. The team's qualification bid suffered a setback when the team still coached by Reyes was involved in a brawl with Australia which led to the suspension of players and officials forcing the Philippines to change its roster for the subsequent qualifier games.

== Timeline ==
- June 17: Training session begins
- July 15: 19-man shortlist announced
- August 25: Final 12-man roster announced
- August 29: Arrival in China
- August 31 – September 15: 2019 FIBA Basketball World Cup

== Qualification ==
=== First round ===
Pos	Team	Pld	W	L	PF	PA	PD	Pts	Qualification
1	Australia	6	5	1	525	392	+133	11	Second round
2	Philippines	6	4	2	470	482	−12	10	Second round
3	Japan	6	2	4	469	464	+5	8	Second round
4	Chinese Taipei	6	1	5	426	552	−126	7	

Source: FIBA
Rules for classification: 1) Points; 2) Head-to-head results; 3) Points difference; 4) Points scored.

=== Second round ===
Pos	Team	Pld	W	L	PF	PA	PD	Pts	Qualification
1	Australia	12	10	2	1055	727	+328	22	2019 FIBA Basketball World Cup
2	Japan	12	8	4	988	844	+144	20 (Note: Japan 2–0; Iran 0–2)	2019 FIBA Basketball World Cup
3	Iran	12	8	4	890	811	+79	20	2019 FIBA Basketball World Cup
4	Philippines	12	7	5	970	935	+35	19	2019 FIBA Basketball World Cup
5	Kazakhstan	12	4	8	828	963	−135	16	
6	Qatar	12	2	10	732	1027	−295	14	

Source: FIBA
Rules for classification: 1) Points; 2) Head-to-head results; 3) Points difference; 4) Points scored.

== Exhibition games ==
The schedule of the Philippine Basketball Association (PBA) season is one of the factors weighed in organizing exhibition games as preparation of the Philippine national team for the FIBA Basketball World Cup since majority of its players participate in the league. For this reason the Philippines' basketball federation, the Samahang Basketbol ng Pilipinas (SBP), decided against the team's participation in the 2019 William Jones Cup due to conflicting schedule with the PBA. A pocket national teams' tournament to be held in Metro Manila was planned.

Playing at least a match Australia was considered which was also intended as a goodwill measure to rebuild trust between the two national teams following the Philippines–Australia brawl. However, Australia informed their Philippine counterparts that their schedule is already full so a scrimmage is not possible prior to the 2019 FIBA World Cup. Exhibition matches was considered against South Korea and New Zealand.

The PBA Board also approved on April 25, 2019, a four-day training camp for the Philippine national team in Russia where they are expected to play games against local teams along with consenting their players to participate in twice-a-week practices in June and July. However, the Russian camp was cancelled after the Russian basketball federation could only commit one single tune-up match.

=== Spain training camp ===
The Philippine national team had a training camp in Spain where they played tune ups against the Democratic Republic of the Congo and the Ivory Coast in Guadalajara. After the two games they participated in a pocket tournament in Spain, which also involved the two African teams and the hosts. The Philippines won their games against their two African opponents prior to the tournament. The tournament in Malaga had the Philippines tie up with DR Congo and the Ivory Coast with Spain. The winner of the two ties contested in the final while the losers played for third place. The Philippines lost their second matchup against the DR Congo conceding an opportunity to play Spain which won over other African team in the pocket tournament.

11 players out of the 19-man shortlist participated in the Spain training camp with majority of the players missing out are from 2019 PBA Commissioner's Cup finalists TNT KaTropa and San Miguel Beermen. Raymond Almazan who had his visa application denied, Jordan Clarkson, Stanley Pringle who is nursing a slight ankle injury, did not join the camp. Kiefer Ravena while part of the 11 players participating did not play in any of the tune up matches against national teams due to serving a FIBA suspension which is due to end a week prior to the world cup.

=== Tune up matches at home ===
The first tune up game of the Philippine national team was against the 2019 William Jones Cup-bound local side Mighty Sports. Their game against the club ended in a draw with both teams scoring 85 points. The national team also had a scrimmage against the NLEX Road Warriors of the Philippine Basketball Association playing four 25-minute, first to 21-points games against the professional team. NLEX won the first set with the national team winning the next three sets.

Shortly before leaving for China, the national team had two tune-up matches against the Adelaide 36ers at the Meralco Gym in Pasig on August 23 and 25, 2019. The national team won 92–83 over the Adelaide-based professional team and conceded a 75–85 loss in the second game. Ravena after serving his 18-month FIBA suspension played in the second game.

=== Summary ===
Against local-based sides

July 8

Report

Philippines	85–85	Mighty Sports

Meralco Gym, Pasig

Tune up matches in Spain

August 6

Report

DR Congo	80–102	Philippines

Palacio Multiusos de Guadalajara, Guadalajara

August 7

Ivory Coast	83–94	Philippines

Palacio Multiusos de Guadalajara, Guadalajara

Malaga Tournament

August 9
22:00

Report

DR Congo	82–71	Philippines
Scoring by quarter: 18–21, 14–12, 26–22, 24–16
Pts: Mvouika 21		Pts: Bolick 21

Palacio de Deportes José María Martín Carpena, Málaga

August 10

Report

Ivory Coast	63–73	Philippines
Scoring by quarter: 13–17, 26–22, 27–27, 21–21
Pts: Thompson 20		Pts: Bolick 19

Palacio de Deportes José María Martín Carpena, Málaga

Goodwill Games

August 23

Report

Philippines	92–83	(Australia) Adelaide 36ers
Scoring by quarter: 25–16, 25–33, 23–19, 19–15
Pts: Blatche 19		Pts: Moore 16

Meralco Gym, Pasig

August 25

Report

Philippines	75–85	(Australia) Adelaide 36ers
Scoring by quarter: 13–29, 17–15, 18–23, 27–18
Pts: Blatche 16		Pts: Johnson 16

Meralco Gym, Pasig

== Roster ==
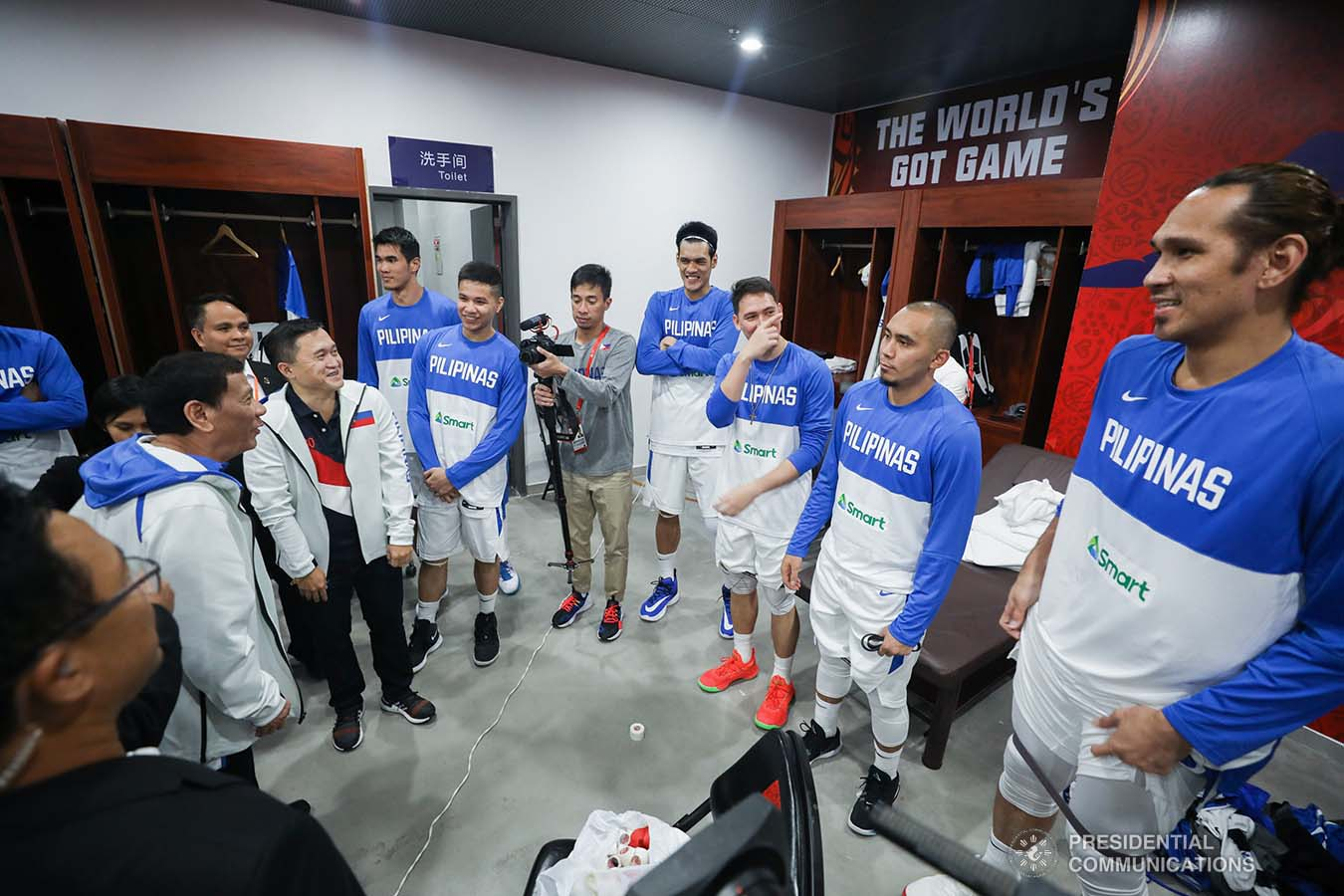
President Rodrigo Duterte meets with members of the Philippine national team prior to their game against Italy.

The PBA has committed its players' participation in the FIBA Basketball World Cup. It was decided that the Philippines will field two separate teams for the intercontinental competition and the 2019 Southeast Asian Games, which the country will host. The SBP negotiated for FIBA's recognition of Jordan Clarkson of the Cleveland Cavaliers' eligibility to play as a "local player" rather than a "naturalized" player. Head coach Yeng Guiao decided not to include Clarkson in the final roster due to the absence of a FIBA decision that would allow him to play as a local player.

A training pool was formed from where the team's coaching staff selected players from. Players who were invited to the pool includes Robert Bolick, Gabe Norwood, June Mar Fajardo, Marcio Lassiter, Troy Rosario, Paul Lee, Raymond Almazan, Japeth Aguilar, CJ Perez, Kiefer Ravena, and Matthew Wright. Beau Belga and Stanley Pringle despite not being part of the pool also took part in training sessions. By June 5, 2019, no additional players are being invited to the pool.

A shortlist of 19 players was announced by the national federation which includes Blatche, Clarkson, and Pringle who are considered naturalized players by FIBA. The final 12-man roster was officially announced to the public on August 25, 2019, after the second tune up game of the national team against the Adelaide 36ers, with Poy Erram, Matthew Wright and Marcio Lassiter not making into the final squad due to injuries. 2014 FIBA World Cup holdovers, Andray Blatche, June Mar Fajardo, and Japeth Aguilar are part of the roster.

Philippines national basketball team – 2019 FIBA Basketball World Cup roster
Players
Coaches

Pos.	No.	Name	Age – Date of birth	Height	Club	Ctr.
PG	3	Paul John Dalistan	31 – February 14, 1988	6 ft 0 in (1.83 m)	Magnolia Hotshots	(Philippines)
PG	4	Kiefer Isaac Ravena	25 – October 27, 1993	6 ft 0 in (1.83 m)	NLEX Road Warriors	(Philippines)
SF	5	Gabriel Daniel Norwood (C)	34 – February 9, 1985	6 ft 6 in (1.98 m)	Rain or Shine Elasto Painters	(Philippines)
SG	8	Robert Bolick	23 – September 13, 1995	6 ft 1 in (1.85 m)	NorthPort Batang Pier	(Philippines)
C	11	Andray Blatche (NP)	33 – August 22, 1986	6 ft 11 in (2.11 m)	Tianjin Gold Lions	(China)
PG	14	Andy Mark Barroca	27 – April 25, 1992	5 ft 10 in (1.78 m)	Magnolia Hotshots	(Philippines)
C	15	June Mar Fajardo	29 – November 17, 1989	6 ft 10 in (2.08 m)	San Miguel Beermen	(Philippines)
SG	16	Roger Ray Pogoy	27 – June 16, 1992	6 ft 2 in (1.88 m)	TNT KaTropa	(Philippines)
SG	17	Christian Jaymar Perez	25 – November 17, 1993	6 ft 2 in (1.88 m)	Columbian Dyip	(Philippines)
PF	18	Jeth Troy Rosario	27 – January 20, 1992	6 ft 7 in (2.01 m)	TNT KaTropa	(Philippines)
C	20	Raymond Almazan	30 – August 2, 1989	6 ft 8 in (2.03 m)	Meralco Bolts	(Philippines)
PF	25	Japeth Paul Aguilar	32 – January 25, 1987	6 ft 9 in (2.06 m)	Barangay Ginebra San Miguel	(Philippines)

Head coach

- (Philippines) Yeng Guiao

Assistant coach(es)

- (Philippines) Ford Arao
- (Philippines) Caloy Garcia
- (Philippines) Ryan Gregorio

Legend

- (C) Team captain
- Club – describes last
  club before the tournament
- Age – describes age
  on 31 August 2019

The following were candidates to make the team:

Earlier candidates
Player	Team (Note: Player's team at the time they were removed from consideration, listed under column Removed)	Added	Removed	Reason
Jordan Clarkson	(United States) Cleveland Cavaliers	July 15, 2019	August 21, 2019	Eligibility
Marcio Lassiter	(Philippines) San Miguel Beermen	July 15, 2019	August 23, 2019	Injury
Poy Erram	(Philippines) NLEX Road Warriors	July 15, 2019	August 25, 2019	Injury
Matthew Wright	(Philippines) Phoenix Pulse Fuel Masters	July 15, 2019	August 25, 2019	Injury
Beau Belga	(Philippines) Rain or Shine Elasto Painters	July 15, 2019	August 25, 2019	12-man roster cut
Christian Standhardinger	(Philippines) San Miguel Beermen	July 15, 2019	August 25, 2019	12-man roster cut
Stanley Pringle	(Philippines) Barangay Ginebra San Miguel	July 15, 2019	August 25, 2019	12-man roster cut

Jayson Castro who was not included in the training pool reportedly opted out in July 2019 from the national team's preparations due to undisclosed personal reasons.

== Staff ==
Position	Staff member	Age	Team
Head coach	(Philippines) Yeng Guiao	60	(Philippines) NLEX Road Warriors
Assistant coaches	(Philippines) Ford Arao	34	(Philippines) NLEX Road Warriors
Assistant coaches	(Philippines) Caloy Garcia	44	(Philippines) Rain or Shine Elasto Painters
Assistant coaches	(Philippines) Ryan Gregorio	47	—N/a
Physiotherapist	(Spain) Jaime Capella	–	—N/a

Age – describes age on 31 August 2019

== Uniform ==
- Supplier: Nike
- Main sponsor: Smart Communications

Home	Away

== Group phase ==
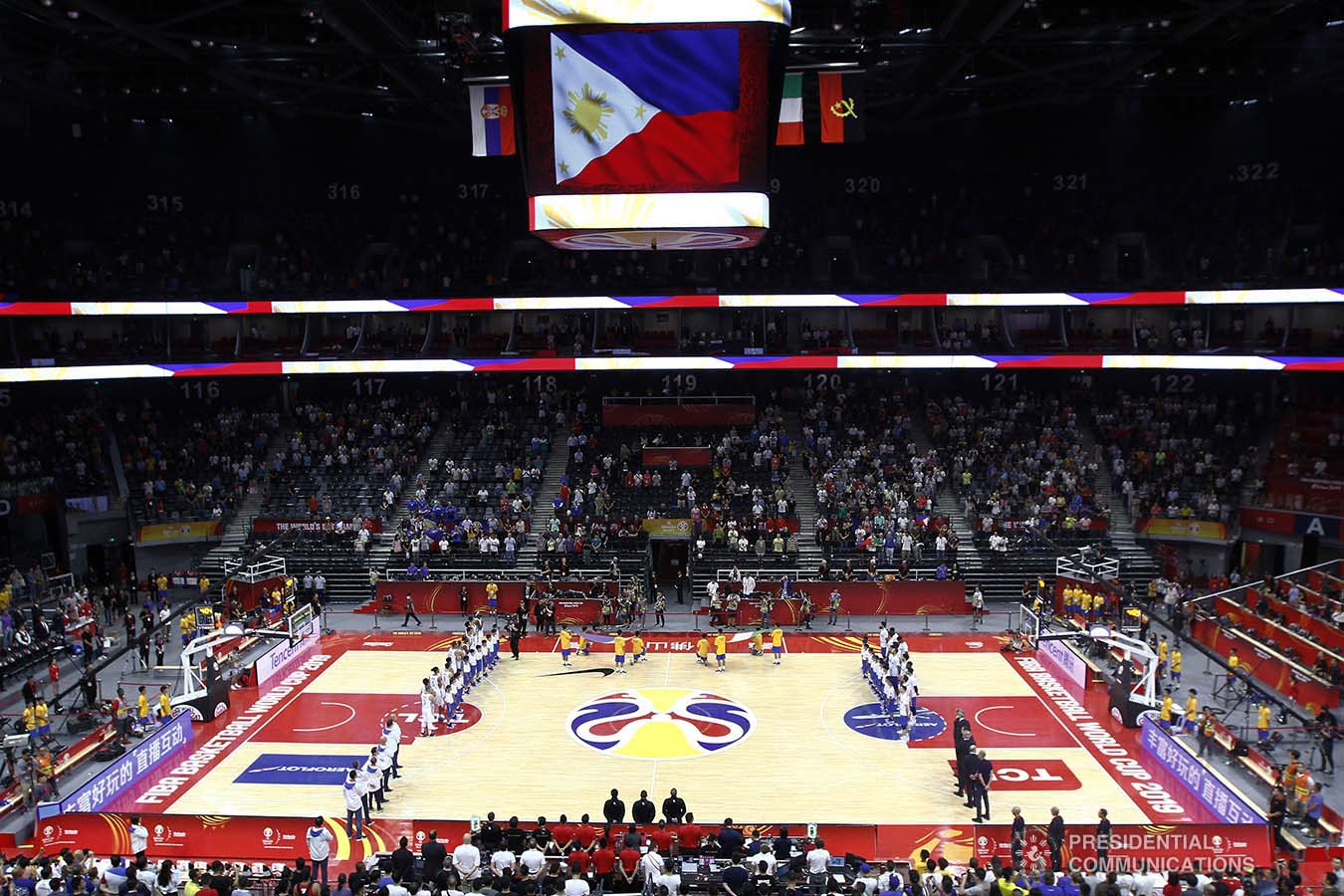
The Foshan International Sports and Cultural Center.

The Philippines was drawn into Group D with Serbia, Italy, and Angola and played all of its group phase matches in Foshan at the Foshan International Sports and Cultural Center from August 31 to September 4. During this round, the national team was billeted at the Hilton Foshan Hotel which is situated 5.9 km (3.7 mi) from the indoor arena. The Philippine national team left Manila by plane for Guangzhou, China on August 29, 2019, and after arriving in the Guangdong province capital departed for Foshan via bus.

The Philippines hoped to progress to the next round with the tie against Italy and Angola tagged as crucial by head coach Yeng Guiao. Expectations of winning against Serbia was tempered but Guiao hoped for the team to win against Italy. Assuming the Philippines won over Italy and lose to Serbia, Guiao said that the Philippines had to win against Angola or the hypothetical win over Italy would have been rendered as "useless".

Guiao also sent his assistants Sandy Arespacochaga and Ford Arao to China ahead of the rest of the team and tasked them to do scouting on Serbia and Italy which played a tune up game against each other on August 23, 2019.

Pos	Team	Pld	W	L	PF	PA	PD	Pts	Qualification
1	Serbia	3	3	0	323	203	+120	6	Second round
2	Italy	3	2	1	277	215	+62	5	Second round
3	Angola	3	1	2	204	278	−74	4	17th–32nd classification
4	Philippines	3	0	3	210	318	−108	3	17th–32nd classification

Source: FIBA
Rules for classification: Tiebreakers

All times are local UTC+8.

=== Italy ===
This was the second game between the Philippines and Italy in the World Cup with the Italians winning on their first meeting in 1978. The two teams last played each other in the 2016 Imperial Basketball City Tournament as part of the Philippines' preparation for the 2016 FIBA World Olympic Qualifying Tournament where the Italians won over the Filipinos by 36 points.

31 August 2019
19:30

Boxscore

Philippines	62–108	Italy
Scoring by quarter: 8–37, 16–25, 15–23, 23–23
Pts: Blatche, Perez 15; Rebs: Blatche 10; Asts: Perez 3		Pts: Datome, Della Valle 17; Rebs: Tessitori 8 Asts: Vitali 5

Foshan International Sports and Cultural Center, Foshan
Attendance: 10,500
Referees: Steve Anderson (USA), Yohan Rosso (FRA), Yu Jung (TPE)

The Philippines lost their opener 2019 FIBA Basketball World Cup game against Italy. The Philippines's opening campaign was marred by poor shooting performance with Filipinos only successfully executed three of the 23 three pointer attempts and the first three points made with 7:03 left in the fourth quarter. In contrast, the Italians accomplished 15 of their 31 three-pointer attempts and made 30 assists compared to 10 assists by the Filipinos. Philippines Head coach Yeng Guiao also concluded that team made too much turnovers.

The Philippines trailed heavily as early as the end of first quarter with the team only scoring 8 points compared to the 37 points made by the Italians.

Starters:			Pts	Reb	Ast
PG	14	Mark Barroca	2	1	0
SG	16	Roger Pogoy	2	0	0
SF	5	Gabe Norwood	0	1	1
PF	25	Japeth Aguilar	2	4	0
C	1	Andray Blatche	15	10	2
Reserves:					
PG	3	Paul Lee	2	1	1
PG	4	Kiefer Ravena	5	2	0
SG	8	Robert Bolick	6	2	1
C	15	June Mar Fajardo	9	6	1
SG	17	CJ Perez	15	2	3
SF	18	Troy Rosario	2	2	1
PF	20	Raymond Almazan	2	1	0
Head coach:
(Samahang Basketbol ng Pilipinas) Yeng Guiao

Philippines	Italy

Philippines	Statistics	Italy
22/41 (54%)	2-pt field goals	24/36 (67%)
3/23 (13%)	3-pt field goals	15/31 (48%)
9/12 (75%)	Free throws	15/21 (71%)
13	Offensive rebounds	10
21	Defensive rebounds	28
34	Total rebounds	38
10	Assists	30
23	Turnovers	13
5	Steals	13
1	Blocks	3
22	Fouls	16

Starters:			Pts	Reb	Ast
PG	10	Daniel Hackett	7	4	4
SG	3	Marco Belinelli	9	3	4
SF	70	Luigi Datome	17	3	2
PF	8	Danilo Gallinari	16	3	4
C	6	Paul Biligha	8	3	0
Reserves:					
SG	00	Amedeo Della Valle	17	4	3
SF	5	Alessandro Gentile	6	1	2
PG	7	Luca Vitali	2	0	5
PG	12	Ariel Filloy	7	1	2
PF	15	Jeff Brooks	8	4	1
C	16	Amedeo Tessitori	9	8	1
SF	23	Awudu Abass	2	0	1
Head coach:
(Italian Basketball Federation) Romeo Sacchetti

=== Serbia ===
This was the first competitive game between Serbia and the Philippines.

2 September 2019
19:30

Boxscore

Serbia	126–67	Philippines
Scoring by quarter: 28–13, 34–22, 37–13, 27–19
Pts: Bjelica 20; Rebs: Jokić 7 Asts: Jokić, Micić 7		Pts: Perez 16; Rebs: Fajardo 6 Asts: Blatche 6

Foshan International Sports and Cultural Center, Foshan
Attendance: 10,000
Referees: Guilherme Locatelli (BRA), Yu Jung (TPE), Yohan Rosso (FRA)

Serbia had a slow start to the game and the Philippines tried to grow in the confidence. Tied at 7-all with six minutes left in the opening quarter, center Nikola Jokić came off the bench and the Serbian offense started to roll. The Serbs used a 7–0 run to close the first 10 minutes with a 25–13 lead. Forward Nemanja Bjelica came off the bench making all 7 of his field-goal attempts, including 3 three-pointers to finish with a game-high 20 points in just 16 minutes of action. Serbia not only out-rebounded Philippines 37–23, but they finished with 37 assists against Philippines' 14.

This is the game won by largest points margin at 59 for the Serbians at any of major tournaments since 2006. With 37 team assists Serbia set the World Cup record for the most assists in a single game.

Starters:			Pts	Reb	Ast
PG	22	Vasilije Micić	11	2	7
SG	7	Bogdan Bogdanović	17	2	5
F	11	Vladimir Lučić	4	4	1
PF	14	Stefan Birčević	6	3	1
C	21	Nikola Milutinov	10	2	0
Reserves:					
SF	5	Marko Simonović	7	3	0
F	8	Nemanja Bjelica	20	2	1
C	13	Miroslav Raduljica	13	4	4
PF	15	Nikola Jokić	11	7	7
SG	23	Marko Gudurić	12	1	2
PG	24	Stefan Jović	6	4	4
C	51	Boban Marjanović	9	2	3
Head coach:
(Basketball Federation of Serbia) Aleksandar Đorđević

Serbia

Philippines

Serbia	Statistics	Philippines
36/42 (86%)	2-pt field goals	21/43 (49%)
12/22 (55%)	3-pt field goals	4/24 (17%)
18/22 (82%)	Free throws	13/18 (72%)
5	Offensive rebounds	11
32	Defensive rebounds	12
37	Total rebounds	23
37	Assists	14
13	Turnovers	14
9	Steals	7
3	Blocks	1
16	Fouls	25

Starters:			Pts	Reb	Ast
PG	3	Paul Dalistan	15	1	1
SF	18	Troy Rosario	2	3	0
SF	5	Gabe Norwood	0	1	0
PF	25	Japeth Aguilar	7	4	1
C	1	Andray Blatche	5	4	6
Reserves:					
PG	4	Kiefer Ravena	5	0	0
SG	8	Robert Bolick	7	1	1
PG	14	Mark Barroca	DNP		
C	15	June Mar Fajardo	8	6	2
SG	16	Roger Pogoy	2	1	0
SG	17	CJ Perez	16	0	3
PF	20	Raymond Almazan	0	0	0
Head coach:
(Samahang Basketbol ng Pilipinas) Yeng Guiao

=== Angola ===
This was the first competitive game between Angola and the Philippines.

4 September 2019
15:30

Boxscore

Angola	84–81 (OT)	Philippines
Scoring by quarter: 21–20, 17–14, 18–12, 17–27, Overtime: 11–8
Pts: Joaquim 20; Rebs: Moreira 15; Asts: Paulo 6		Pts: Blatche 23; Rebs: Blatche 12; Asts: Ravena 4

Foshan International Sports and Cultural Center, Foshan
Attendance: 5,500
Referees: Guilherme Locatelli (BRA), Yevgeniy Mikheyev (KAZ), Scott Beker (AUS)

Unlike in games against Italy and Serbia which ended in heavy defeats, the Philippines performed relatively better against Angola. While Angola lead throughout most of regulation time, the Philippines kept the gap to a manageable levels trailing 12 points at most. By the time when there was only 2:33 of time remaining in the fourth quarter, the Philippines were leading Angola 70–67. Angolan player Carlos Morais restored the Angolan lead rendering the scoreline 70–73. CJ Perez tied the game by scoring a three pointer but the Philippines failed to score further baskets forcing the game to go overtime. However the Philippines failed to secure the win in overtime.

== Classification round ==
The Philippines finished last among four teams in Group C and was grouped with Angola, Iran and Tunisia in Group N in the classification round. The Philippines played games against the latter two in Beijing with the result of their loss to Angola carrying over. Had they progressed to the second round as one of the top two finishers of Group C, they would have played against Puerto Rico and Spain in Wuhan.

Pos	Team	Pld	W	L	PF	PA	PD	Pts
1	Tunisia	5	3	2	377	386	−9	8
2	Iran	5	2	3	379	372	+7	7
3	Angola	5	1	4	350	435	−85	6
4	Philippines	5	0	5	352	499	−147	5

Source: FIBA
Rules for classification: Tiebreakers

=== Tunisia ===
The Philippines' bid to qualify for the 2020 Summer Olympics as the best Asian team in the 2019 FIBA World Cup ended when Tunisia defeated them. Tunisia led the Philippines early with the first quarter ending in a 27–10 scoreline in favor of the North Africans.

6 September 2019
20:00

Boxscore

Tunisia	86–67	Philippines
Scoring by quarter: 27–10, 19–14, 21–15, 19–28
Pts: Abada 16; Rebs: Mejri 12; Asts: Roll 4		Pts: Blatche 24; Rebs: Blatche 11; Asts: five players 2

Wukesong Arena, Beijing
Referees: Matthew Kallio (CAN), Boris Krejić (SVN), Harja Jaladri (IDN)

=== Iran ===
The Philippines' last game in the 2019 FIBA Basketball World Cup is against Iran. The Philippines lost both of its two 2019 FIBA Basketball World Cup qualifier games to Iran; a 73–81 defeat in Tehran and a 70–78 loss at home in Pasay. Iran was coming off from a 71–62 win against Angola, their first in the tournament, and was still in contention for a berth at the 2020 Summer Olympics while the Philippines was looking to secure at least a win.

The Philippines kept the game close in the first quarter trailing only a point, 25–24, with 37.5 seconds left in the clock with its players successfully executing six of its eleven attempted three pointers. However the first quarter ended 30–24 in favor of Iran. CJ Perez restored the close gap of 34–31 in the second quarter but the first half ended in a 48–34 score still favoring Iran. Iran was leading the Philippines by 23 points, 64–41, with 4:10 left in the third quarter with the Philippines unable to restore at least a small gap in the scoreline. Mid-way in the fourth quarter Andray Blatche was fouled out after incurring two technical fouls after he argued with the referees regarding an alleged foul on him.

8 September 2019
20:00

Boxscore

Iran	95–75	Philippines
Scoring by quarter: 30–24, 18–10, 27–16, 20–25
Pts: Haddadi 19; Rebs: Haddadi 7 Asts: Jamshidi, Yakhchali 5		Pts: Bolick 15; Rebs: Blatche 5 Asts: Blatche 5

Wukesong Arena, Beijing
Referees: Matthew Kallio (CAN), Scott Beker (AUS), Nicolas Fernandes (TAH)

== Aftermath ==
The Philippines ended their 2019 FIBA Basketball World Cup campaign without a win after playing five games, finishing dead last as a result of their poor performance. They also didn't manage to clinch the single outright Asian berth for the 2020 Summer Olympics by failing to finish as the best performing team from FIBA Asia with Iran, the Philippines' last opponent claiming the berth instead. The only route for the Philippines to qualify for the Summer Olympics is to get invited as one of the two Asian wildcard teams for the Olympic qualifying tournaments. An invite was not given, thus extending their drought in participation in the Olympic basketball tournament. Eventually, however, the country was invited to the 2020 FIBA Men's Olympic Qualifying Tournament in Belgrade as New Zealand withdrew from the tournament, opening up a spot as the next highest ranked Asian team. The country finished its OQT campaign with losses to Serbia and the Dominican Republic, the former of which was by a close margin.

Head coach Yeng Guiao cited the lack of preparation as the reason for the Philippines' dismal performance in the world cup and reasoned that preparation should be started years prior to the tournament but added that the team did their best despite "limitations". He also suggested that the national team should gain more experience playing against teams outside Asia particularly European and Latin American teams.

Guiao eventually resigned as the team's head coach.

Tim Cone became the new head coach of the Philippines, who clinched the gold medal in the Men's basketball tournament of the 2019 Southeast Asian Games, which the country hosted. The team's gold medal victory contributed to the country's medal haul of 149 gold medals, out of the 387 medals won by the Philippines.

Since then, Jong Uichico and Tab Baldwin had stints as head coach of the country, the latter of which guided the team in their 3-0 run in the final window of the 2022 FIBA Asia Cup qualifiers and the 2020 FIBA Olympic Qualifying Tournament. Since February 2022, former national team coach Chot Reyes has been at the helm of the national team.

The Philippines is set to participate in the next edition of the World Cup in 2023, as one of the hosts, taking on 2019 foes Angola and Italy, and 2020 OQT opponents the Dominican Republic in the group phase.

Under Reyes' current stint as head coach, the team also participated in the 2022 FIBA Asia Cup in Jakarta, Indonesia, finishing 9th, and participated in the qualification process for the 2023 World Cup, finishing 2nd and 3rd in the first round and second round respectively, albeit being automatically qualified as one of the hosts. The team also finished silver in the 2021 Southeast Asian Games for the first time since 1989, losing to Indonesia, but reclaimed the gold medal at the 2023 edition in Cambodia.

== See also ==
- 2019 Serbia FIBA Basketball World Cup team
- 2019 United States FIBA Basketball World Cup team
- 2019 Italy FIBA Basketball World Cup team
