= 2019 FIBA Basketball World Cup final =

Basketball game in Beijing, China

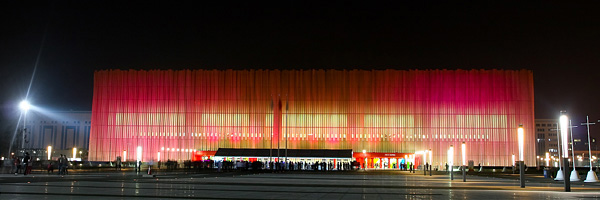
- The Wukesong Arena in Beijing hosted the match
Argentina	Spain
(Argentina)	(Spain)
75	95
	1	2	3	4	Total
Argentina	14	17	16	28	75
Spain	23	20	23	29	95
- Date: 15 September 2019
- Venue: Wukesong Arena, Beijing
- Coaches: Sergio Hernández (Argentina); Sergio Scariolo (Spain)
- TCL Man of the Match: Ricky Rubio (Spain)
- Referees: Cristiano Maranho (Brazil); Yohan Rosso (France); Steven Anderson (United States)
- Attendance: 11,110

The 2019 FIBA Basketball World Cup final was the concluding basketball game which determined the winner of the 2019 FIBA Basketball World Cup. The game was played on 15 September 2019, at the Wukesong Arena, in Beijing, China, between Argentina and Spain.

At halftime, a turnover ceremony was held to officially hand over the hosting rights of the FIBA Basketball World Cup from China to the Philippines, Japan, and Indonesia, hosts of the 2023 FIBA Basketball World Cup, which will take place from 25 August to 10 September.

The Naismith Trophy was awarded to the winning team for the first time since the unveiling of its new version in 2017.

Spain won their second World Cup title after a 95–75 win. Marc Gasol became the first player since Lamar Odom in 2010 to win an NBA championship and a World Cup in the same year, and the first non-American to win an NBA or WNBA title and either a World Cup or Olympic gold medal in the same year.

== Route to the final ==
Argentina
Round
Spain
Opponent
Result
Preliminary round
Opponent
Result
South Korea
95–69
Game 1
Tunisia
101–62
Nigeria
94–81
Game 2
Puerto Rico
73–63
Russia
69–61
Game 3
Iran
73–65

Pos	Team	Pld	W	L	PF	PA	PD	Pts	Qualification
1	Argentina	3	3	0	258	211	+47	6	Second round
2	Russia	3	2	1	230	219	+11	5	Second round
3	Nigeria	3	1	2	266	242	+24	4	17th–32nd classification
4	South Korea	3	0	3	208	290	−82	3	17th–32nd classification

Source: FIBA
Final standing

Pos	Team	Pld	W	L	PF	PA	PD	Pts	Qualification
1	Spain	3	3	0	247	190	+57	6	Second round
2	Puerto Rico	3	2	1	213	218	−5	5	Second round
3	Tunisia	3	1	2	205	235	−30	4	17th–32nd classification
4	Iran	3	0	3	213	235	−22	3	17th–32nd classification

Source: FIBA
Opponent
Result
Second round
Opponent
Result
Venezuela
87–78
Game 4
Italy
67–60
Poland
91–65
Game 5
Serbia
81–69

Pos	Team	Pld	W	L	PF	PA	PD	Pts	Qualification
1	Argentina	5	5	0	436	343	+93	10	Quarter-finals
2	Poland	5	4	1	383	373	+10	9	Quarter-finals
3	Russia	5	3	2	373	358	+15	8	
4	Venezuela	5	2	3	355	366	−11	7	

Source: FIBA
Final standing

Pos	Team	Pld	W	L	PF	PA	PD	Pts	Qualification
1	Spain	5	5	0	395	319	+76	10	Quarter-finals
2	Serbia	5	4	1	482	331	+151	9	Quarter-finals
3	Italy	5	3	2	431	371	+60	8	
4	Puerto Rico	5	2	3	349	402	−53	7	

Source: FIBA
Opponent
Result
Final round
Opponent
Result
Serbia
97–87
Quarter-finals
Poland
90–78
France
80–66
Semi-finals
Australia
95–88 (2OT)

=== Argentina ===
Argentina topped Group B in Wuhan, after beating Russia in the final group game. They also defeated South Korea and Nigeria to end with a 3–0 record in the first round. Group I in Foshan also saw the South Americans topping the group, thereby qualifying to the quarter-finals. Their win against Poland won them the group. In the quarter-finals at Dongguan, Argentina defeated 2014 World Cup runners-up and 2016 Olympic silver medalists Serbia by 10 points to qualify to the semi-finals. France, which had defeated the United States in their own quarter-final match-up, faced the South Americans in the semi-final at Beijing. Luis Scola scored his tournament-high 28 points in the game, and Rudy Gobert was limited to just three points, which led to Argentina advancing to its first World Cup final since 2002, which was Scola's first.

=== Spain ===
The Spaniards finished on top of Group C in Guangzhou. The Europeans defeated Tunisia, Puerto Rico and Iran to end up undefeated going into the second round. At the second round Group J at Wuhan, Spain ran away winners of the group after defeating Italy and erstwhile undefeated team Serbia to finish the group stages with a 5–0 record. In the quarter-finals at Shanghai, Spain eliminated surprise qualifiers Poland, off the back of Ricky Rubio's near double-double of 19 points and nine assists, plus five rebounds. A pair of three-point shots was the difference late in the fourth quarter that prevented the Poles from cutting the lead. In the semi-final against Australia at Beijing, the Australians led by as many as 11 points in the third quarter, but the Spaniards came back to tie the game at the end of regulation, 71-all. In overtime, Marc Gasol and Patty Mills scored three-pointers, but with the game tied at 78-all, Mills was fouled, and converted both free-throws. Gasol was fouled himself on the next possession, and also made both of his foul shots. Matthew Dellavedova tried to win it at the buzzer, but missed, sending the game to double overtime. Spain opened the second overtime with two three-pointers, and that was the difference, qualifying them to their second World Cup final, after winning it in 2006.

== Game details ==
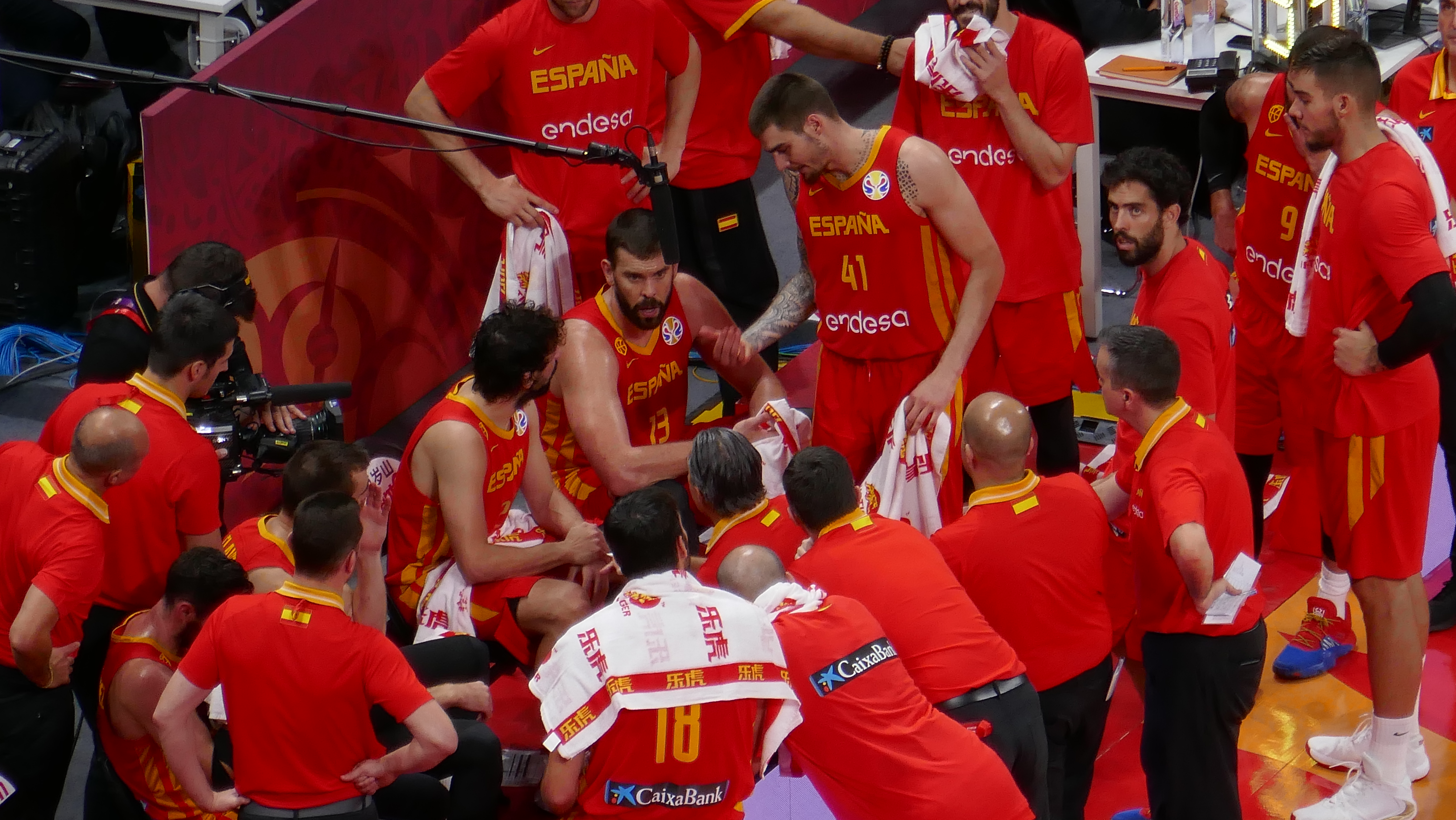
Spanish players during a time-out in the final.

This is the eighth meeting between Argentina and Spain at the World Cup, with the Spaniards winning five; Argentina won two, including their last meeting at the 2010 World Championship. Spain won the last competitive meeting, at the 2016 Summer Olympics.

Spain led by 14–2 at the start of the game. Argentina recovered to finish the first quarter with 14 points against Spain's 22. The lead then fluctuated, but once the Argentinians cut the deficit to twelve at the start of the third quarter, the Spaniards went on a 14–0 run, leading by 55–33. The Spaniards never looked back. Ricky Rubio scored 20 points in the game, and limited Facundo Campazzo to just 11 points in 20% field-goal percentage. Luis Scola was also limited to 1/10 shooting in the game, and didn't score until making his free-throws late in the third quarter, as Gabriel Deck had a game high 24 points. Marc Gasol scored 14 points, had a team high 7 assists, had 2 steals, and blocked 3 shots in the game. Argentina tried to mount a comeback in the fourth period, but by then the lead was too great, and there was little time remaining by then. Spain won its second World Cup, with Gasol and Fernández being also a part of the first title in 2006.

15 September 2019
20:00

Boxscore

Argentina	75–95	Spain
Scoring by quarter: 14–23, 17–20, 16–23, 28–29
Pts: Deck 24; Rebs: Scola 8 Asts: Campazzo 8		Pts: Rubio 20; Rebs: Fernández 10; Asts: Gasol 7

Wukesong Arena, Beijing
Attendance: 11,110
Referees: Cristiano Maranho (BRA), Yohan Rosso (FRA), Steven Anderson (USA)

Starters:			Pts	Reb	Ast
PG	7	Facundo Campazzo	11	2	8
SF	29	Patricio Garino	0	2	0
SF	9	Nicolás Brussino	8	2	2
PF	4	Luis Scola	8	8	2
C	12	Marcos Delía	2	4	1
Reserves:					
C	1	Agustín Caffaro	0	0	0
PG	3	Luca Vildoza	2	1	1
PG	8	Nicolás Laprovíttola	17	1	0
SG	10	Máximo Fjellerup	0	0	0
PF	14	Gabriel Deck	24	1	0
SG	25	Lucio Redivo	3	0	0
PF	83	Tayavek Gallizzi	0	0	0
Head coach:
(Argentine Basketball Confederation) Sergio Hernández

Argentina	Spain

Argentina	Statistics	Spain
15/34 (44%)	2-pt field goals	25/45 (56%)
7/27 (26%)	3-pt field goals	6/20 (30%)
24/28 (86%)	Free throws	27/33 (82%)
5	Offensive rebounds	13
22	Defensive rebounds	34
27	Total rebounds	47
15	Assists	20
14	Turnovers	14
11	Steals	9
1	Blocks	8
28	Fouls	25

Starters:			Pts	Reb	Ast
PG	9	Ricky Rubio	20	7	3
SF	5	Rudy Fernández	11	10	3
PF	41	Juan Hernangómez	11	5	1
PF	18	Pierre Oriola	6	7	0
C	13	Marc Gasol	14	7	7
Reserves:					
PG	1	Quino Colom	0	0	0
SG	8	Pau Ribas	5	1	1
PF	10	Víctor Claver	2	3	2
C	14	Willy Hernangómez	11	3	1
SF	22	Xavi Rabaseda	0	1	0
SG	23	Sergio Llull	15	0	2
SF	33	Javier Beirán	0	0	0
Head coach:
(Italian Basketball Federation) Sergio Scariolo

== Rosters ==
Argentina

Argentina national basketball team – 2019 FIBA Basketball World Cup roster
Players
Coaches

Pos.	No.	Name	Age – Date of birth	Height	Club	Ctr.
C	1	Agustín Caffaro	24 – 6 February 1995	2.10 m (6 ft 11 in)	San Lorenzo	(Argentina)
PG	3	Luca Vildoza	24 – 11 August 1995	1.91 m (6 ft 3 in)	Saski Baskonia	(Spain)
PF	4	Luis Scola (C)	39 – 30 April 1980	2.06 m (6 ft 9 in)	Shanghai Sharks	(China)
PG	7	Facundo Campazzo	28 – 23 March 1991	1.81 m (5 ft 11 in)	Real Madrid	(Spain)
PG	8	Nicolás Laprovíttola	29 – 31 January 1990	1.93 m (6 ft 4 in)	Real Madrid	(Spain)
SF	9	Nicolás Brussino	26 – 2 March 1993	2.03 m (6 ft 8 in)	Basket Zaragoza	(Spain)
SG	10	Máximo Fjellerup	21 – 27 November 1997	1.97 m (6 ft 6 in)	San Lorenzo	(Argentina)
C	12	Marcos Delía	27 – 8 April 1992	2.10 m (6 ft 11 in)	Fuerza Regia	(Mexico)
PF	14	Gabriel Deck	24 – 8 February 1995	2.00 m (6 ft 7 in)	Real Madrid	(Spain)
SG	25	Lucio Redivo	25 – 12 February 1994	1.83 m (6 ft 0 in)	Breogán	(Spain)
SF	29	Patricio Garino	26 – 17 March 1993	2.01 m (6 ft 7 in)	Saski Baskonia	(Spain)
PF	83	Tayavek Gallizzi	26 – 8 February 1993	2.06 m (6 ft 9 in)	Regatas Corrientes	(Argentina)

Head coach

- (Argentina) Sergio Hernández

Assistant coach(es)

- (Argentina) Nicolás Casalanguida
- (Argentina) Gonzalo García
- (Argentina) Silvio Santander

Legend

- (C) Team captain
- Club – describes last
  club before the tournament
- Age – describes age
  on 31 August 2019

Source: FIBA

Spain

Spain national basketball team – 2019 FIBA Basketball World Cup roster
Players
Coaches

Pos.	No.	Name	Age – Date of birth	Height	Club	Ctr.
PG	1	Quino Colom	30 – November 1, 1988	1.88 m (6 ft 2 in)	Valencia Basket	(Spain)
SF	5	Rudy Fernández	34 – April 4, 1985	1.96 m (6 ft 5 in)	Real Madrid	(Spain)
SG	8	Pau Ribas	32 – March 2, 1987	1.97 m (6 ft 6 in)	FC Barcelona	(Spain)
PG	9	Ricky Rubio	28 – October 21, 1990	1.94 m (6 ft 4 in)	Phoenix Suns	(United States)
PF	10	Víctor Claver	31 – August 30, 1988	2.07 m (6 ft 9 in)	FC Barcelona	(Spain)
C	13	Marc Gasol	34 – January 29, 1985	2.17 m (7 ft 1 in)	Toronto Raptors	(Canada)
C	14	Willy Hernangómez	25 – May 23, 1994	2.11 m (6 ft 11 in)	Charlotte Hornets	(United States)
PF	18	Pierre Oriola	26 – October 25, 1992	2.06 m (6 ft 9 in)	FC Barcelona	(Spain)
SF	22	Xavi Rabaseda	30 – February 24, 1989	2.01 m (6 ft 7 in)	CB Gran Canaria	(Spain)
SG	23	Sergio Llull	31 – November 15, 1987	1.91 m (6 ft 3 in)	Real Madrid	(Spain)
SF	33	Javier Beirán	32 – May 22, 1987	2.00 m (6 ft 7 in)	CB Gran Canaria	(Spain)
PF	41	Juan Hernangómez	23 – September 22, 1995	2.07 m (6 ft 9 in)	Denver Nuggets	(United States)

Head coach

- (Italy) Sergio Scariolo

Assistant coach(es)

- (Spain) Manuel Aller
- (Spain) Luis Guil
- (Spain) Ángel Sánchez-Cañete

Legend

- (C) Team captain
- Club – describes last
  club before the tournament
- Age – describes age
  on 31 August 2019

Source: FIBA
