= 2019 FIBA Basketball World Cup Group D =

Basketball tournament group stage

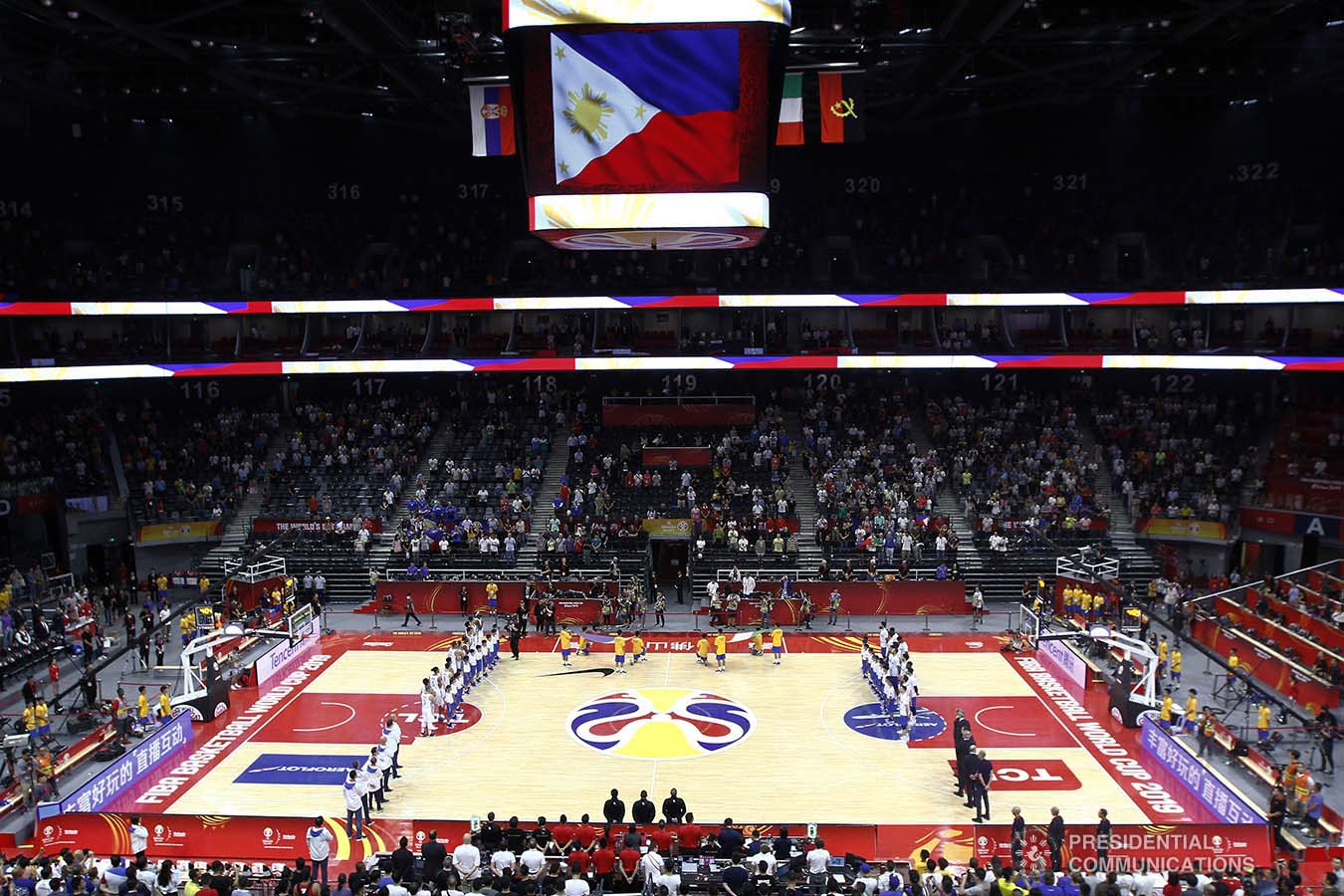
Foshan International Sports and Cultural Center the venue of the 2019 FIBA Basketball World Cup's Group D matches.

Group D was one of eight groups of the preliminary round of the 2019 FIBA Basketball World Cup. It took place from 31 August to 4 September 2019, and consisted of Angola, Italy, the Philippines, and Serbia. Each team played each other once, for a total of three games per team, with all games played at Foshan International Sports and Cultural Center, Foshan. After all of the games were played, the top two teams with the best records qualified for the Second round and the bottom two teams played in the Classification Round.

== Teams ==
| Team | Qualification | | Appearance | | | Best performance | FIBA World Ranking |
| Team | As | Date | Last | Total | Streak | Best performance | FIBA World Ranking |
|---|---|---|---|---|---|---|---|
| Angola | African Second Round Group F Top 2 | 1 December 2018 | 2014 | 8 | 5 | 9th place (2006) | 39 |
| Philippines | Asian best fourth placed team | 24 February 2019 | 2014 | 6 | 2 | 3rd place (1954) | 31 |
| Italy | European Second Round Group J Top 3 | 22 February 2019 | 2006 | 9 | 1 | 4th place (1970, 1978) | 13 |
| Serbia | European Second Round Group L Top 3 | 24 February 2019 | 2014 | 3 | 3 | 2nd place (2014) | 4 |

== Standings ==
| Pos | Team | Pld | W | L | PF | PA | PD | Pts | Qualification |
|---|---|---|---|---|---|---|---|---|---|
| 1 | Serbia | 3 | 3 | 0 | 323 | 203 | +120 | 6 | Second round |
| 2 | Italy | 3 | 2 | 1 | 277 | 215 | +62 | 5 | Second round |
| 3 | Angola | 3 | 1 | 2 | 204 | 278 | −74 | 4 | 17th–32nd classification |
| 4 | Philippines | 3 | 0 | 3 | 210 | 318 | −108 | 3 | 17th–32nd classification |

Source: FIBA
Rules for classification: Tiebreakers

== Games ==
All times are local (UTC+8).

=== Angola vs. Serbia ===
This was the second game between Angola and Serbia in the World Cup. The Serbians won the first meeting in 2010. The Serbians won in the 2016 FIBA World Olympic Qualifying Tournament, the last competitive game between the two teams.

31 August 2019
15:30

Boxscore

| Angola | 59–105 | Serbia |
Scoring by quarter: 20–29, 12–21, 15–28, 12–27
| Pts: Morais 15; Rebs: Joaquim 5 Asts: seven players 1 | | Pts: Bogdanović 24; Rebs: Marjanović 10; Asts: Jović 9 |

Foshan International Sports and Cultural Center, Foshan
Attendance: 11,000
Referees: Guilherme Locatelli (BRA), Mārtiņš Kozlovskis (LAT), Scott Beker (AUS)

=== Philippines vs. Italy ===
This was the second meeting between the Philippines and Italy in the World Cup. The Italians won the first matchup in 1978, which was also the last competitive game between the two teams.

31 August 2019
19:30

Boxscore

| Philippines | 62–108 | Italy |
Scoring by quarter: 8–37, 16–25, 15–23, 23–23
| Pts: Blatche, Perez 15; Rebs: Blatche 10; Asts: Perez 3 | | Pts: Datome, Della Valle 17; Rebs: Tessitori 8 Asts: Vitali 5 |

Foshan International Sports and Cultural Center, Foshan
Attendance: 10,500
Referees: Steven Anderson (USA), Yohan Rosso (FRA), Yu Jung (TPE)

=== Italy vs. Angola ===
This was the second game between Angola and Italy in the World Cup. The Italians won the first meeting in 1990, which was also the last competitive game between the two teams.

2 September 2019
15:30

Boxscore

| Italy | 92–61 | Angola |
Scoring by quarter: 25–11, 19–10, 26–21, 22–19
| Pts: Belinelli 17; Rebs: Brooks 11; Asts: Hackett 3 | | Pts: Moreira 15; Rebs: Moreira 8 Asts: Morais 2 |

Shanghai Oriental Sports Center, Shanghai
Attendance: 5,900
Referees: Steven Anderson (USA), Mārtiņš Kozlovskis (LAT), Yevgeniy Mikheyev (KAZ)

=== Serbia vs. Philippines ===
This was the first competitive game between Serbia and the Philippines.

2 September 2019
19:30

Boxscore

| Serbia | 126–67 | Philippines |
Scoring by quarter: 28–13, 34–22, 37–13, 27–19
| Pts: Bjelica 20; Rebs: Jokić 7 Asts: Jokić, Micić 7 | | Pts: Perez 16; Rebs: Fajardo 6 Asts: Blatche 6 |

Foshan International Sports and Cultural Center, Foshan
Attendance: 10,900
Referees: Guilherme Locatelli (BRA), Yu Jung (TPE), Yohan Rosso (FRA)

=== Angola vs. Philippines ===
This was the first competitive game between Angola and the Philippines.

4 September 2019
15:30

Boxscore

| Angola | 84–81 (OT) | Philippines |
Scoring by quarter: 21–20, 17–14, 18–12, 17–27, Overtime: 11–8
| Pts: Joaquim 20; Rebs: Moreira 15; Asts: Paulo 6 | | Pts: Blatche 23; Rebs: Blatche 12; Asts: Ravena 4 |

Foshan International Sports and Cultural Center, Foshan
Attendance: 6,400
Referees: Guilherme Locatelli (BRA), Yevgeniy Mikheyev (KAZ), Scott Beker (AUS)

=== Italy vs. Serbia ===
This was the first game between Italy and Serbia in the World Cup. Serbia won in its last competitive match against Italy at EuroBasket 2017.

4 September 2019
19:30

Boxscore

| Italy | 77–92 | Serbia |
Scoring by quarter: 23–28, 19–22, 15–20, 20–22
| Pts: Gallinari 26; Rebs: Gallinari 8 Asts: Belinelli 4 | | Pts: Bogdanović 31; Rebs: Bjelica 7 Asts: Bjelica 9 |

Foshan International Sports and Cultural Center, Foshan
Attendance: 15,000
Referees: Steven Anderson (USA), Yohan Rosso (FRA), Yu Jung (TPE)

== See also ==
- 2019 Italy FIBA Basketball World Cup team
- 2019 Philippines FIBA Basketball World Cup team
- 2019 Serbia FIBA Basketball World Cup team
