= 2019 FIBA Basketball World Cup Group J =

Basketball tournament group stage

Group J was one of four groups of the second round of the 2019 FIBA Basketball World Cup. It took place from 6 to 8 September 2019, and consisted of the top-two teams from Groups C and D. The results from the preliminary round were carried over. The teams from Group C played the teams from Group D, for a total of two games per team, with all matches played at Wuhan Sports Center Gymnasium, Wuhan. After all of the games were played, the top two teams advanced to the quarter-finals, the third placed team was classified 9 to 12, and the fourth placed team 13 to 16.

== Qualified teams ==
Group	Winner	Runner-up
C	Spain	Puerto Rico
D	Serbia	Italy

== Standings ==
Pos	Team	Pld	W	L	PF	PA	PD	Pts	Qualification
1	Spain	5	5	0	395	319	+76	10	Quarter-finals
2	Serbia	5	4	1	482	331	+151	9	Quarter-finals
3	Italy	5	3	2	431	371	+60	8	
4	Puerto Rico	5	2	3	349	402	−53	7	

Source: FIBA
Rules for classification: Tiebreakers

== Games ==
All times are local UTC+8.

=== Serbia vs. Puerto Rico ===
This was the first game between Puerto Rico and Serbia in the World Cup. Serbia won in its last competitive game against Puerto Rico, in the 2016 FIBA World Olympic Qualifying Tournament.

6 September 2019
16:30

Boxscore

Serbia	90–47	Puerto Rico
Scoring by quarter: 23–14, 26–12, 22–13, 19–8
Pts: Bjelica 18; Rebs: Jokić 10; Asts: Jović 9		Pts: Huertas 20; Rebs: Collier, Rodríguez 5 Asts: Rodríguez 4

Wuhan Sports Center Gymnasium, Wuhan
Attendance: 4,605
Referees: Cristiano Maranho (BRA), Mārtiņš Kozlovskis (LAT), Zdenko Tomašovič (SVK)

=== Spain vs. Italy ===
6 September 2019
20:30

Boxscore

Spain	67–60	Italy
Scoring by quarter: 18–18, 12–13, 20–17, 17–12
Pts: J. Hernangómez 16; Rebs: Claver 9 Asts: Fernández 5		Pts: Gallinari 15; Rebs: Hackett 8 Asts: Belinelli 4

Wuhan Sports Center Gymnasium, Wuhan
Attendance: 3,749
Referees: Steven Anderson (USA), Guilherme Locatelli (BRA), Omar Bermúdez (MEX)

=== Puerto Rico vs. Italy ===
8 September 2019
16:30

Boxscore

Puerto Rico	89–94 (OT)	Italy
Scoring by quarter: 24–13, 22–13, 18–24, 19–33, Overtime: 6–11
Pts: Balkman 14; Rebs: Clemente 9 Asts: Rodríguez 5		Pts: Belinelli 27; Rebs: Abass 8 Asts: Gallinari 5

Wuhan Sports Center Gymnasium, Wuhan
Attendance: 5,162
Referees: Guilherme Locatelli (BRA), Zdenko Tomašovič (SVK), Mārtiņš Kozlovskis (LAT)

=== Spain vs. Serbia ===
This was the third match between Spain and Serbia in the World Cup, with both teams winning once in previous matches. Serbia won in its last competitive game against Spain, in the EuroBasket 2015 group stage.

8 September 2019
20:30

Boxscore

Spain	81–69	Serbia
Scoring by quarter: 13–20, 32–17, 22–19, 14–13
Pts: Rubio 19; Rebs: Claver 7 Asts: Gasol 6		Pts: Bogdanović 26; Rebs: Bogdanović 10; Asts: Bogdanović 6

Wuhan Sports Center Gymnasium, Wuhan
Attendance: 7,737
Referees: Cristiano Maranho (BRA), Steven Anderson (USA), Omar Bermúdez (MEX)

== See also ==
- 2019 Italy FIBA Basketball World Cup team
- 2019 Serbia FIBA Basketball World Cup team
