= Trentino Basket Cup =

- Formerly: Trentino Cup (2009)
- Sport: Basketball
- Founded: 2009
- No. of teams: 4
- Venues: PalaTrento, Trento
- Most recent champions: Italy (6th title)
- Most titles: Italy (6 titles)

The Trentino Basket Cup is an annual friendly basketball tournament hosted by the Italian national basketball team. The tournament consists of four teams and is held in Trento.

== Editions ==
Year	Champions	Runners-up	Third place	Fourth place	MVP
2009	Italy	Canada	New Zealand	Portugal	–
2012	Italy	Montenegro	Finland	Bosnia and Herzegovina	–
2013	Italy	Israel	Poland	Georgia	–
2014	Italy	Germany	Netherlands	Belgium	–
2015	Germany	Italy	Austria	Netherlands	(Italy) Luigi Datome
2016	Italy	China	Turkey	Czech Republic	(Italy) Marco Belinelli
2017	Italy	Netherlands	Belarus	Ukraine	
2019	Italy	Ivory Coast	Switzerland	Romania	(Italy) Alessandro Gentile

== 2019 Edition ==
Four teams took part in the 2019 edition of the Trentino Basket Cup: Ivory Coast and Italy, that were preparing for the World Cup. While Romania and Switzerland were preparing for the Eurobasket 2021.

Semifinal
30 July
Switzerland	68
Ivory Coast	69
30 July
Italy	88
Romania	60

Final
31 July
Ivory Coast	58
Italy	69
Third place
31 July
Switzerland	86
Romania	66
