= PalaTrento =

Indoor arena in Trento, Italy

Coordinates: 46.0410°N 11.1227°E

BTS Arena
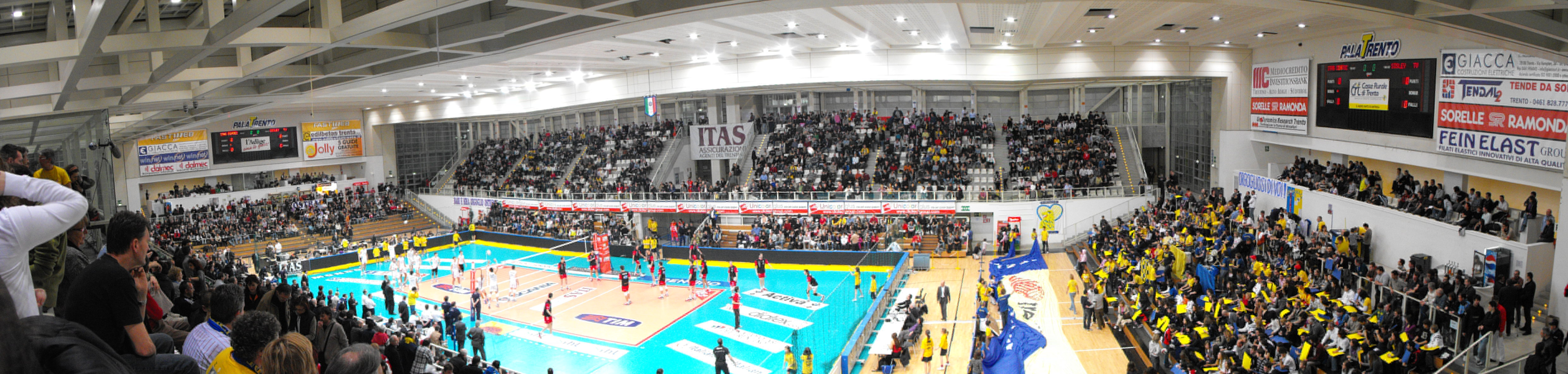
- Interactive map of BTS Arena
- Former names: PalaTrento, PalaGhiaie
- Location: Trento, Italy
- Capacity: Box seats: 3,569; Retractable seats: 4,360
- Surface: Parquet

Construction
- Opened: 2000

Tenants
- Trentino Volley; Aquila Basket Trento

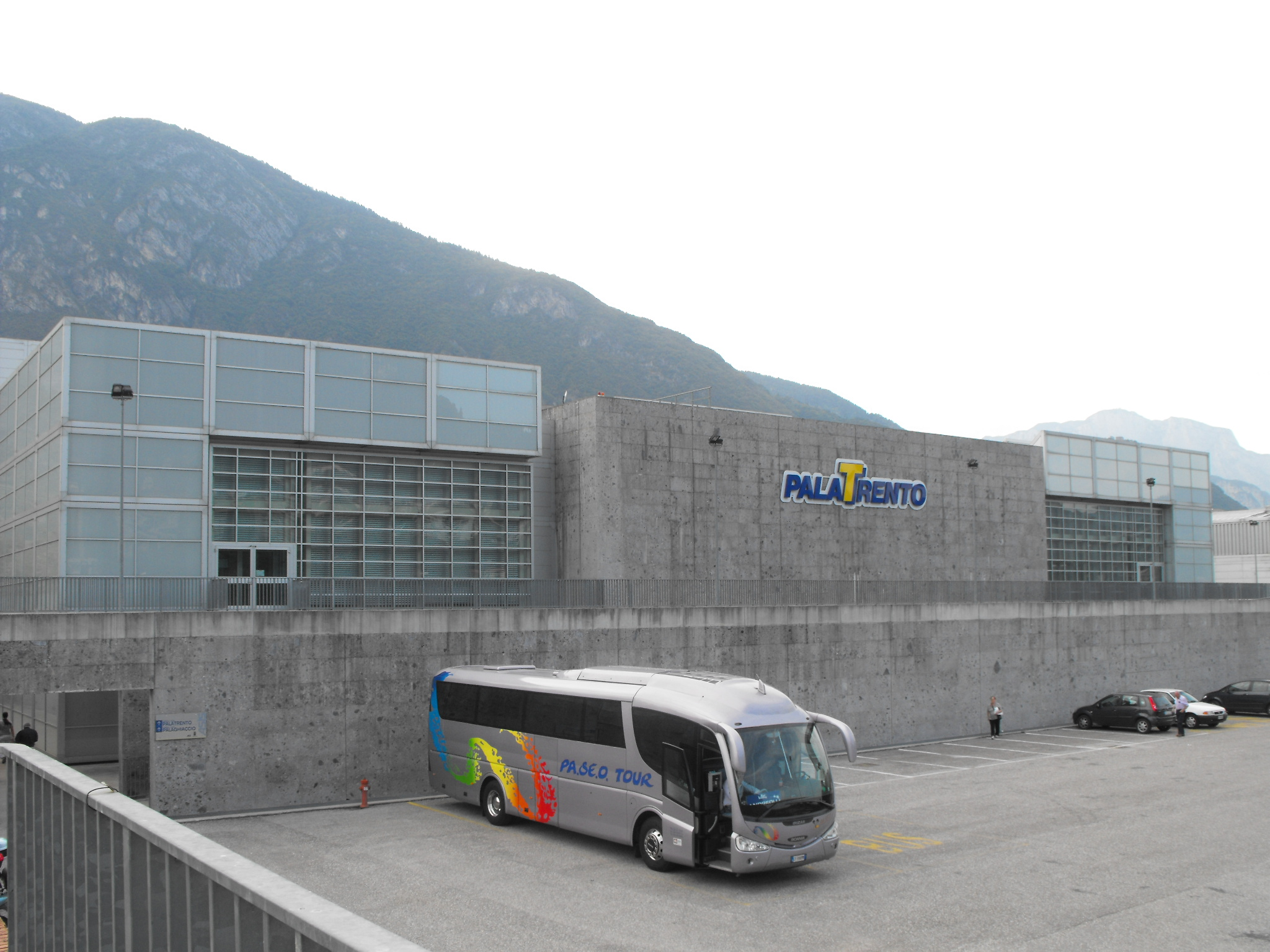
PalaTrento

BTS Arena (formerly known as PalaTrento) is an indoor arena that is located in Trento, Italy. The arena is mainly used to host volleyball, basketball, futsal, and concerts. The capacity of the arena is 4,360, with 3,569 of the seats being upper tier box seating, and 791 of the seats being lower tier retractable seating.

The arena includes a gym for gymnastics, a fencing area, a judo hall, a weight lifting room, a sports bar, a medical infirmary, and an interview room.

== History ==
The arena was opened in 2000, and since then has become the home arena of the Italian League basketball club Aquila Basket Trento, and also the Italian Volleyball League club Trentino Volley.

Since 2012 it has hosted the Trentino Basket Cup.
