= Ramón Clemente =

Puerto Rican basketball player

Personal information
- Born: December 11, 1985 (age 40) Queens, New York, U.S.
- Listed height: 6 ft 6 in (1.98 m)
- Listed weight: 225 lb (102 kg)

Career information
- High school: John Bowne (Flushing, New York)
- College: Paris JC (2005–2007); Wichita State (2007–2009)
- NBA draft: 2009: undrafted
- Playing career: 2009–2026
- Position: Power forward

Career history
- 2009: Indios de Mayagüez
- 2009–2010: Maccabi Ashdod
- 2010–2011: Hapoel Yokneam Megido
- 2011: Indios de Mayagüez
- 2011: Halcones Rojos Veracruz
- 2011–2012: Hapoel Kiryat Tiv'on
- 2012: Indios de Mayagüez
- 2012–2013: Ironi Nahariya
- 2013: Indios de Mayagüez
- 2013–2014: Obras Sanitarias
- 2015–2017: Ferro Carril Oeste
- 2016: Indios de Mayagüez
- 2017: Indios de Mayagüez
- 2017–2018: Ciclista Olímpico
- 2018–2021: Vaqueros de Bayamón
- 2018–2019: Leñadores de Durango
- 2019–2020: San Lorenzo
- 2020–2021: Piratas de Quebradillas
- 2022–2025: Cangrejeros de Santurce

Career highlights
- 2× LNB All-Star (2015, 2016)
Medals
Men's basketball
Representing Puerto Rico
FIBA AmeriCup
Silver medal – second place	2013 Venezuela
Centrobasket
Gold medal – first place	2016 Panama

Ramón Clemente (born December 11, 1985) is a Puerto Rican former professional basketball player, who spent the majority of his career in the Baloncesto Superior Nacional (BSN), most notably for the Indios de Mayagüez, Vaqueros de Bayamón, and Cangrejeros de Santurce.

== College career ==
Clemente started his college career at Paris Junior College in Paris, Texas playing for two years and winning back to back conference championships. In addition, he made the All-American Team.

After junior college, Clemente continued to play college basketball at Wichita State University in Kansas and graduated with a degree in Criminal Justice in 2009.

== Professional career ==
Immediately after graduating in 2009, Clemente played professionally with Mayaguez in Puerto Rico, where he continues to play. During the 2009–10 season, he joined Maccabi Ashdod B.C. in Israeli Liga Leumit.

He played for Hapoel Yokneam Megido (2010–2011), Maccabi Be'er Yaakov (2011–2012), and Irony Nahariya (2012–2013), all in Israel. He then played in Italy during the 2013–2014 season and won a championship. He currently plays for Obras Sanitarias in Argentina.

After a long career playing in his native country Puerto Rico's Baloncesto Superior Nacional (BSN), Clemente announced his retirement from basketball on 16 March, 2026.

== National team career ==
Clemente has been a member of the Puerto Rico men's national basketball team, most notably playing at the 2014 and 2019 FIBA World Cup.
