= 2019 FIBA Basketball World Cup final round =

The final round was the knockout stage of the 2019 FIBA Basketball World Cup. It took place from 10 to 15 September 2019, and consisted of the top-two teams from Groups I, J, K, and L. The round was played in a single-elimination tournament, with games being played at the Dongfeng Nissan Cultural and Sports Centre in Dongguan, the Shanghai Oriental Sports Center in Shanghai, and Wukesong Arena in Beijing. Teams that lost in the quarter-finals were relegated to the classification stage for places 5 to 8.

== Qualified teams ==
| Group | Winner | Second place |
|---|---|---|
| I | Argentina | Poland |
| J | Spain | Serbia |
| K | United States | Czech Republic |
| L | Australia | France |

== Bracket ==
Fifth place
14 September – Beijing
Serbia | 90
Czech Republic | 81
Seventh place
14 September – Beijing
United States | 87
Poland | 74

5th–8th classification
12 September – Dongguan
Serbia | 94
United States | 89
12 September – Shanghai
Poland | 84
Czech Republic | 94

Quarter-finals
10 September – Dongguan
Argentina | 97
Serbia | 87
11 September – Dongguan
United States | 79
France | 89
10 September – Shanghai
Spain | 90
Poland | 78
11 September – Shanghai
Australia | 82
Czech Republic | 70

Semi-finals
13 September – Beijing
Argentina | 80
France | 66
13 September – Beijing
Spain (2OT) | 95
Australia | 88

Final
15 September – Beijing
Argentina | 75
Spain | 95
Third place game
15 September – Beijing
France | 67
Australia | 59

== Quarter-finals ==
All times are local (UTC+8).

=== Argentina vs. Serbia ===
10 September 2019
19:00

Boxscore

| Argentina | 97–87 | Serbia |
Scoring by quarter: 25–23, 29–26, 14–18, 29–20
| Pts: Scola 20; Rebs: Deck 8 Asts: Campazzo 12 | | Pts: Bogdanović 21; Rebs: Jokić 10; Asts: Jokić 5 |

Dongfeng Nissan Cultural and Sports Centre, Dongguan
Attendance: 8,469
Referees: Cristiano Maranho (BRA), Tolga Şahin (ITA), Michael Weiland (CAN)

=== Spain vs. Poland ===
10 September 2019
21:00

Boxscore

| Spain | 90–78 | Poland |
Scoring by quarter: 22–18, 24–23, 21–17, 23–20
| Pts: Rubio 19; Rebs: Rubio 5 Asts: Rubio 9 | | Pts: Slaughter 19; Rebs: Ponitka 11; Asts: Slaughter 6 |

Shanghai Oriental Sports Center, Shanghai
Attendance: 13,300
Referees: Jorge Vázquez (PUR), Yohan Rosso (FRA), Takaki Kato (JPN)

=== United States vs. France ===
France snapped Team USA's 58-game winning streak in international competition that dated back to the bronze-medal game at the 2006 FIBA World Championship.

11 September 2019
19:00

Boxscore

| United States | 79–89 | France |
Scoring by quarter: 18–18, 21–27, 27–18, 13–26
| Pts: Mitchell 29; Rebs: Mitchell 6 Asts: Barnes, Mitchell 4 | | Pts: Fournier 22; Rebs: Gobert 16; Asts: Fournier 4 |

Dongfeng Nissan Cultural and Sports Centre, Dongguan
Attendance: 11,019
Referees: Guilherme Locatelli (BRA), Georgios Poursanidis (GRE), Ferdinand Pascual (PHI)

=== Australia vs. Czech Republic ===
11 September 2019
21:00

Boxscore

| Australia | 82–70 | Czech Republic |
Scoring by quarter: 17–17, 16–13, 30–18, 19–22
| Pts: Mills 24; Rebs: Kay 7 Asts: Mills 6 | | Pts: Auda 21; Rebs: Satoranský 9 Asts: Satoranský 13 |

Shanghai Oriental Sports Center, Shanghai
Attendance: 13,800
Referees: Roberto Vázquez (PUR), Ademir Zurapović (BIH), Matthew Kallio (CAN)

== Classification semi-finals ==
=== Serbia vs. United States ===
12 September 2019
19:00

Boxscore

| Serbia | 94–89 | United States |
Scoring by quarter: 32–7, 12–33, 27–28, 23–21
| Pts: Bogdanović 28; Rebs: Bjelica 5 Asts: Jokić 7 | | Pts: Barnes 22; Rebs: Middleton 6 Asts: Walker 8 |

Dongfeng Nissan Cultural and Sports Centre, Dongguan
Attendance: 9,540
Referees: Cristiano Maranho (BRA), Yu Jung (TPE), Luis Castillo (ESP)

=== Poland vs. Czech Republic ===
12 September 2019
21:00

Boxscore

| Poland | 84–94 | Czech Republic |
Scoring by quarter: 23–23, 12–20, 28–21, 21–30
| Pts: Waczyński 22; Rebs: Kulig 7 Asts: Slaughter 10 | | Pts: Hruban 24; Rebs: Hruban 12; Asts: Satoranský 12 |

Shanghai Oriental Sports Center, Shanghai
Attendance: 8,016
Referees: Juan Fernández (ARG), Boris Krejić (SLO), Yohan Rosso (FRA)

== Semi-finals ==
=== Spain vs. Australia ===
13 September 2019
16:00

Boxscore

| Spain | 95–88 (2OT) | Australia |
Scoring by quarter: 22–21, 10–16, 19–18, 20–16, Overtime: 9–9, 15–8
| Pts: Gasol 33; Rebs: Rubio 7 Asts: Rubio 12 | | Pts: Mills 32; Rebs: Kay 11; Asts: Dellavedova 9 |

Wukesong Arena, Beijing
Attendance: 5,934
Referees: Guilherme Locatelli (BRA), Tolga Şahin (ITA), Omar Bermúdez (MEX)

=== Argentina vs. France ===
13 September 2019
20:00

Boxscore

| Argentina | 80–66 | France |
Scoring by quarter: 21–18, 18–14, 21–16, 20–18
| Pts: Scola 28; Rebs: Scola 13; Asts: Campazzo 6 | | Pts: Fournier, Ntilikina 16; Rebs: Gobert 11; Asts: De Colo 4 |

Wukesong Arena, Beijing
Attendance: 7,945
Referees: Steven Anderson (USA), Ademir Zurapović (BIH), Jorge Vázquez (PUR)

== Seventh place match ==
14 September 2019
16:00

Boxscore

| United States | 87–74 | Poland |
Scoring by quarter: 28–14, 19–16, 16–25, 24–19
| Pts: Mitchell 16; Rebs: Turner 8 Asts: Mitchell 10 | | Pts: Ponitka 18; Rebs: Ponitka 7 Asts: Slaughter 5 |

Wukesong Arena, Beijing
Attendance: 8,210
Referees: Aleksandar Glišić (SRB), Yu Jung (TPE), Takaki Kato (JPN)

== Fifth place match ==
14 September 2019
20:00

Boxscore

| Serbia | 90–81 | Czech Republic |
Scoring by quarter: 20–20, 21–30, 28–12, 21–19
| Pts: Bogdanović 31; Rebs: Jokić 14; Asts: Jokić 7 | | Pts: Auda 16; Rebs: Balvín 10; Asts: Satoranský 6 |

Wukesong Arena, Beijing
Attendance: 8,252
Referees: Guilherme Locatelli (BRA), Georgios Poursanidis (GRE), Michael Weiland (CAN)

== Bronze medal match ==
15 September 2019
16:00

Boxscore

| France | 67–59 | Australia |
Scoring by quarter: 11–16, 10–14, 21–16, 25–13
| Pts: De Colo 19; Rebs: Poirier 7 Asts: Batum 6 | | Pts: Ingles 17; Rebs: Bogut 6 Asts: Dellavedova 5 |

Wukesong Arena, Beijing
Attendance: 7,749
Referees: Roberto Vázquez (PUR), Ademir Zurapović (BIH), Ferdinand Pascual (PHI)

== Final ==
15 September 2019
20:00

Boxscore

| Argentina | 75–95 | Spain |
Scoring by quarter: 14–23, 17–20, 16–23, 28–29
| Pts: Deck 24; Rebs: Scola 8 Asts: Campazzo 8 | | Pts: Rubio 20; Rebs: Fernández 10; Asts: Gasol 7 |

Wukesong Arena, Beijing
Attendance: 11,110
Referees: Cristiano Maranho (BRA), Yohan Rosso (FRA), Steven Anderson (USA)
