= GBA International Sports and Cultural Center =

Chinese indoor arena

Greater Bay Area International Sports and Cultural Center
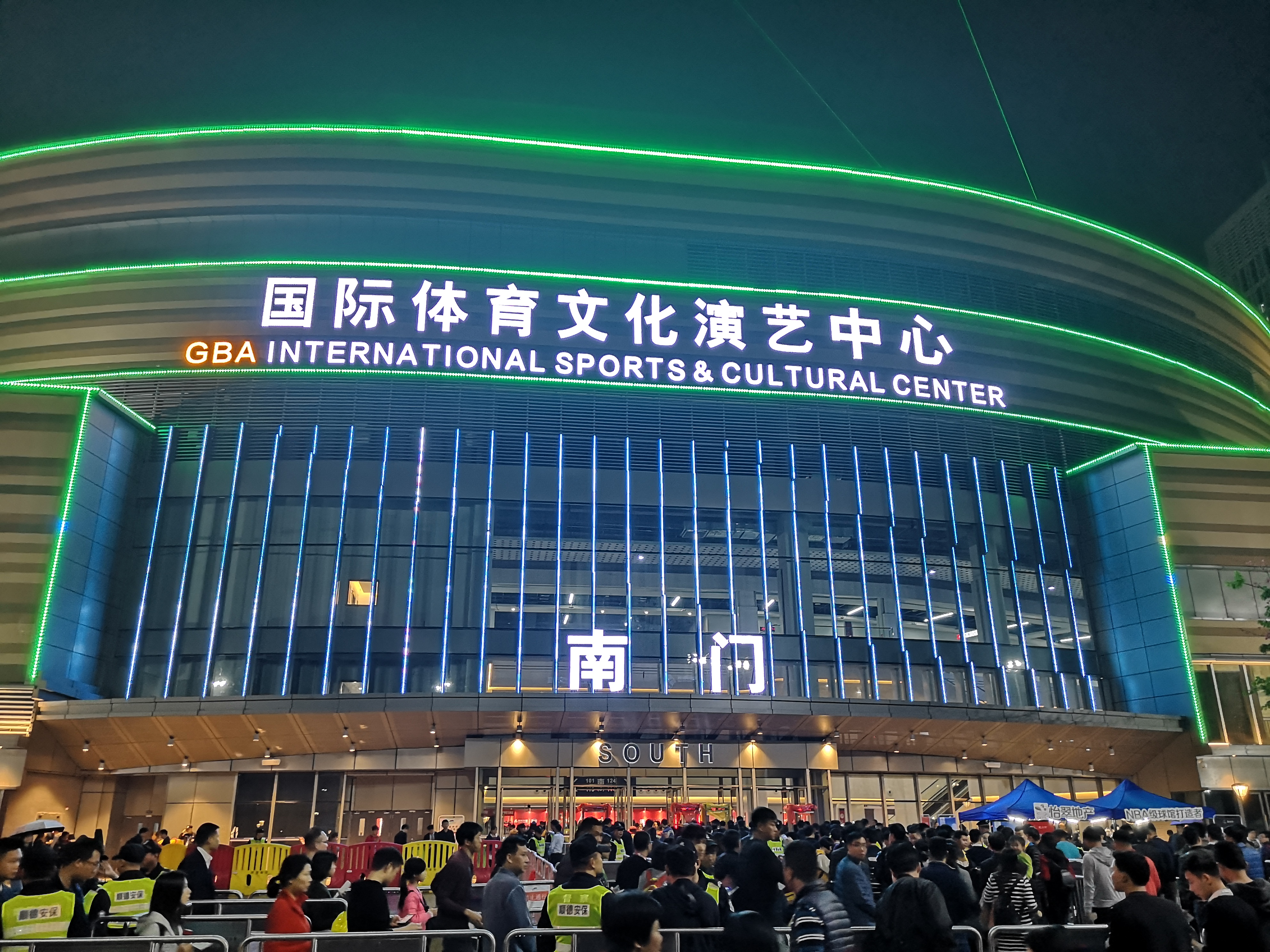
- Interactive map of Greater Bay Area International Sports and Cultural Center
- Address: 95 Yuhe Road
- Location: Foshan, China
- Coordinates: 22.959949°N 113.140953°E
- Owner: City of Foshan
- Operator: Shenzhen Ruida Information Consultant Co., Ltd. (a subsidiary of Nenking Group)
- Capacity: 14,700
- Field size: 38,900 sqm
- Public transit: Guangfo Xincheng Dong

Construction
- Groundbreaking: 20 September 2015
- Built: 2015–2018
- Opened: 10 November 2018
- Architect: DP Architects

Tenants
- Guangzhou Loong Lions (CBA) (2018–present); 2019 FIBA Basketball World Cup (groups D and I); Guangzhou Charge (OWL) (2020-)

Website
- Official Website

The Greater Bay Area International Sports and Cultural Center (Chinese: 佛山国际体育文化演艺中心), or GBA Center, is an indoor arena located in Foshan, China. It is used mostly for basketball matches and concerts.

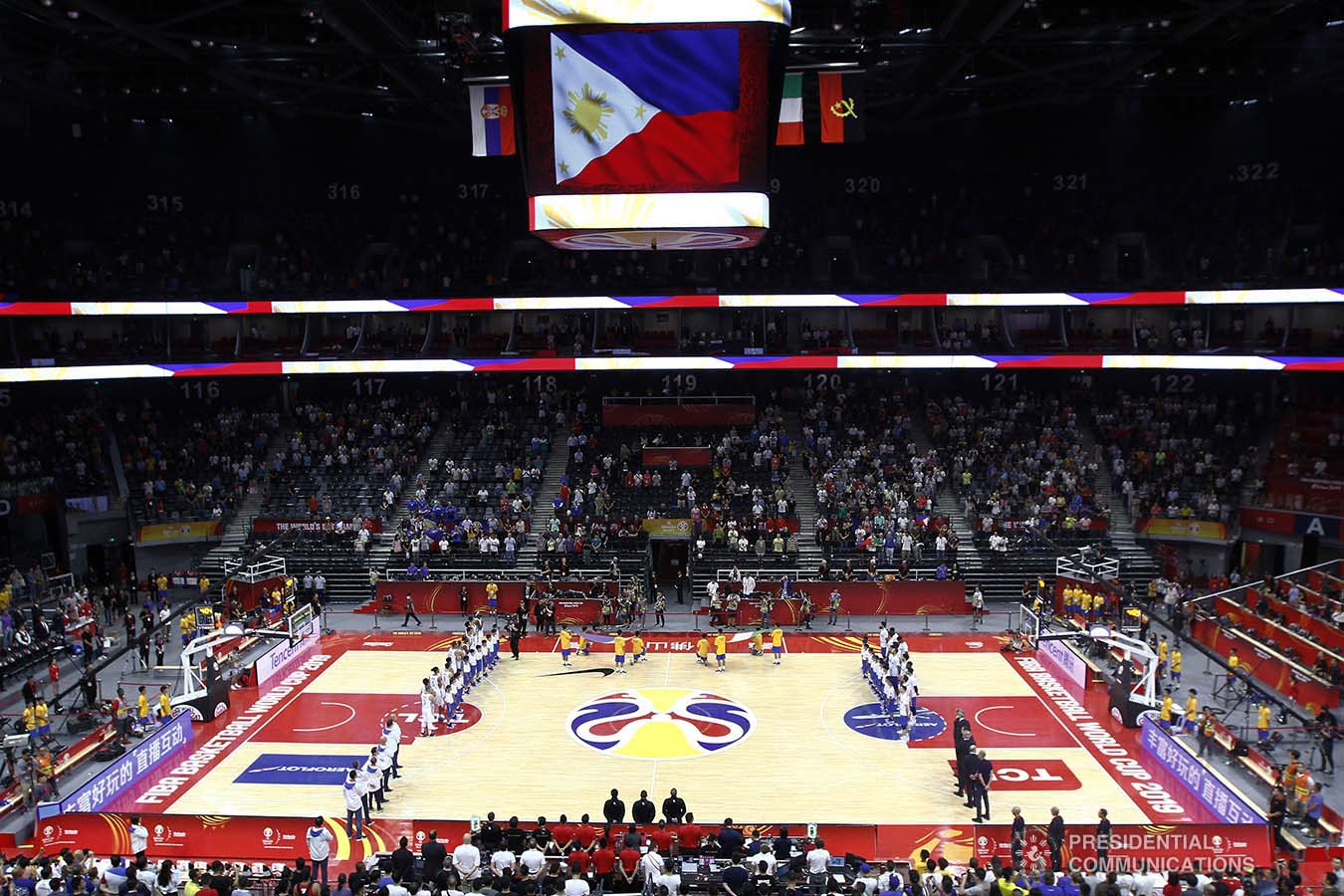
the interior of the arena (taken during the 2019 FIBA Basketball World Cup)

The arena opened on 10 November 2018 as the host of the 27th China Golden Rooster and Hundred Flowers Film Festival. On 2 December 2018, a 2019 FIBA Basketball World Cup qualification match contested by China and Lebanon was hold as the opening match. Guangzhou Loong Lions of Chinese Basketball Association appointed the arena as their second home arena and played six matches of 2018–19 CBA season in December 2018. Guangzhou Charge of the Overwatch League will also play at the arena from 2020 season. Selected games of Macau Black Bears, which also owned by Nenking Group, were played in the arena as well.
