= Luca Vitali =

Italian basketball player

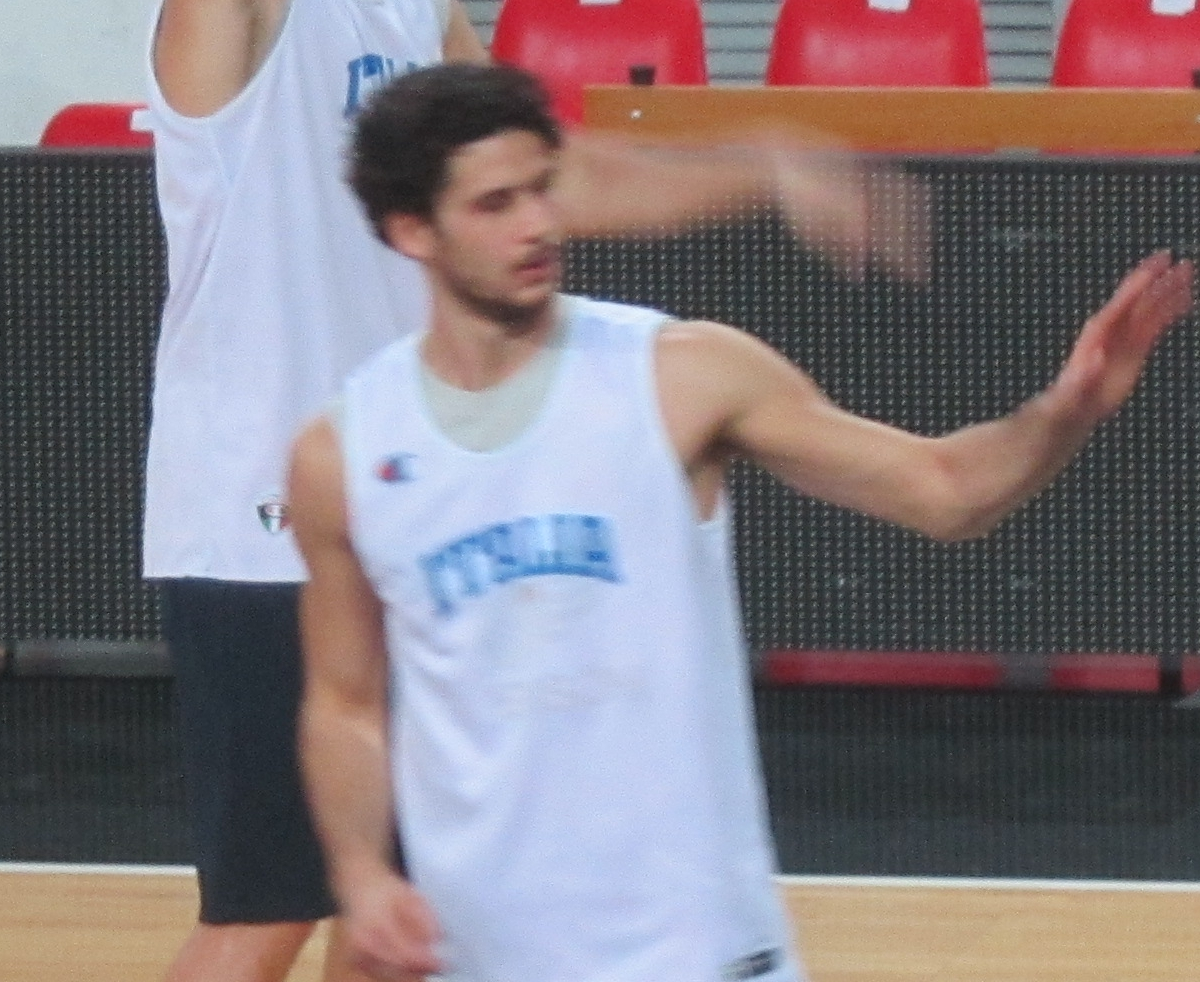
- Vitali with the Italian national team in 2011

Dinamo Sassari
- Title: Head coach
- League: LBA

Personal information
- Born: 9 May 1986 (age 40) San Giorgio di Piano, Italy
- Listed height: 2.01 m (6 ft 7 in)
- Listed weight: 87 kg (192 lb)

Career information
- Playing career: 2003–2025
- Position: Point guard
- Number: 7
- Coaching career: 2026–present

Career history

Playing
- 2003: Virtus Bologna
- 2003–2004: Montepaschi Siena
- 2004–2008: Sutor Montegranaro
- 2008–2009: Olimpia Milano
- 2009–2011: Virtus Roma
- 2011–2012: Virtus Bologna
- 2012–2013: Vanoli Cremona
- 2013–2014: Reyer Venezia Mestre
- 2014–2015: Vanoli Cremona
- 2015: Gran Canaria
- 2015–2016: Vanoli Cremona
- 2016–2021: Brescia Leonessa
- 2022: Napoli
- 2022–2025: Pallacanestro Cantù

Coaching
- 2026–present: Dinamo Sassari

Career highlights
- LBA assists leader (2017); LBA champion (2004); 3× LBA All-Star (2006, 2014, 2015)

Luca Vitali (born 9 May 1986) is an Italian professional basketball coach and former player, currently serving as the head coach for Dinamo Sassari of the Italian Lega Basket Serie A (LBA). As a player, he was regarded as very versatile, capable of playing as a point guard, shooting guard, or even small forward, and noted for his ability to defend multiple positions due to his height and wingspan.

== Professional career ==
Progressing through the youth ranks of hometown club Virtus Bologna he unusually made his debut for the team in Europe's premier competition, the Euroleague, playing a few minutes in 2003.

He would make his first division debut the next year after moving to Montepaschi Siena, then the strongest side in Italy.

After playing little part in their championship winning season he dropped down a division to join LegaDue club Sutor Montegranaro. This proved to be a fruitful move for both sides, he became a starter, helped promote the club to the first division in 2006 and then on to the playoffs, his good performances even led to a call up to the league All star game.

In 2008, he was recruited by ambitious club Armani Jeans Milano with which he rediscovered the Euroleague, he was instrumental in the progress of Milano to the Top 16, scoring a team European record 32 points against Panionios to finish third in their group. However Vitali's time at Armani Jeans ended on a sour note when the club cancelled the last 2 years of his contract, he then joined rivals Lottomatica Roma.

After two years in Rome followed by a brief return to former youth side Virtus Bologna he joined Vanoli Cremona. There he flourished, becoming an undisputed starter for the team and having career best figures in nearly all areas, helping his team escape relegation.

Wanting to play for a stronger side he joined Umana Venezia, where he had a mixed season. This brought him to return to the club where he had the most personal success, Cremona, where he was appointed captain.

On 18 May 2015, Vitali signed with Herbalife Gran Canaria until the end of the 2014–15 ACB season. In July 2015, he returned to Vanoli Cremona.

On 2 April 2022, he has signed with Pallacanestro Cantù of the Italian Serie A2.

== Career statistics ==
=== Euroleague ===
Legend
GP	Games played	GS	Games started	MPG	Minutes per game
FG%	Field-goal percentage	3P%	3-point field-goal percentage	FT%	Free-throw percentage
RPG	Rebounds per game	APG	Assists per game	SPG	Steals per game
BPG	Blocks per game	PPG	Points per game	PIR	Performance index rating
**Bold**	Career high

Year	Team	GP	GS	MPG	FG%	3P%	FT%	RPG	APG	SPG	BPG	PPG	PIR
2002–03	Virtus Bologna	2	0	3.30	0.0	0.0	0.0	0.5	0.0	0.0	0.0	0	-1
2003–04	Montepaschi Siena	2	0	2.15	0.0	**100.0**	0.0	0.0	0.0	0.0	0.0	1,5	-1
2008–09	AJ Milano	**13**	**8**	**24.19**	**44.8**	44.4	91.4	1.4	**2.3**	0.6	0.0	**10.9**	**8**
2009–10	Lottomatica Roma	6	1	19.55	33.3	29.4	**100.0**	1.0	1.0	0.2	**0.2**	5.2	1
2010–11	Lottomatica Roma	10	0	19.08	38.9	40.0	63.6	**1.8**	1.6	**0.9**	0	6	4.7
Career		33	9	13.65	23.4	42.32	51.0	0.94	0.98	0.34	0.04	4.72	2.34

== International career ==
After a period with the under-age Italian team, Vitali joined the senior national team from 2007.

He was regularly called up from there on but remained a fringe player, part of Italy's EuroBasket 2013 squad, he played sparingly. He started commanding more game time in EuroBasket 2015 qualification that saw Italy qualify for the tournament. He was called up to the preliminary squad for EuroBasket 2015, but was injured during the tournament preparation and had to leave the team before the main tournament.

== Personal life ==
He comes from a basketball family as his brother is fellow player Michele Vitali with whom he played one season for Virtus Bologna and presently for the Italian national basketball team, their parents were also players.
