= Amedeo Tessitori =

Italian basketball player (born 1994)

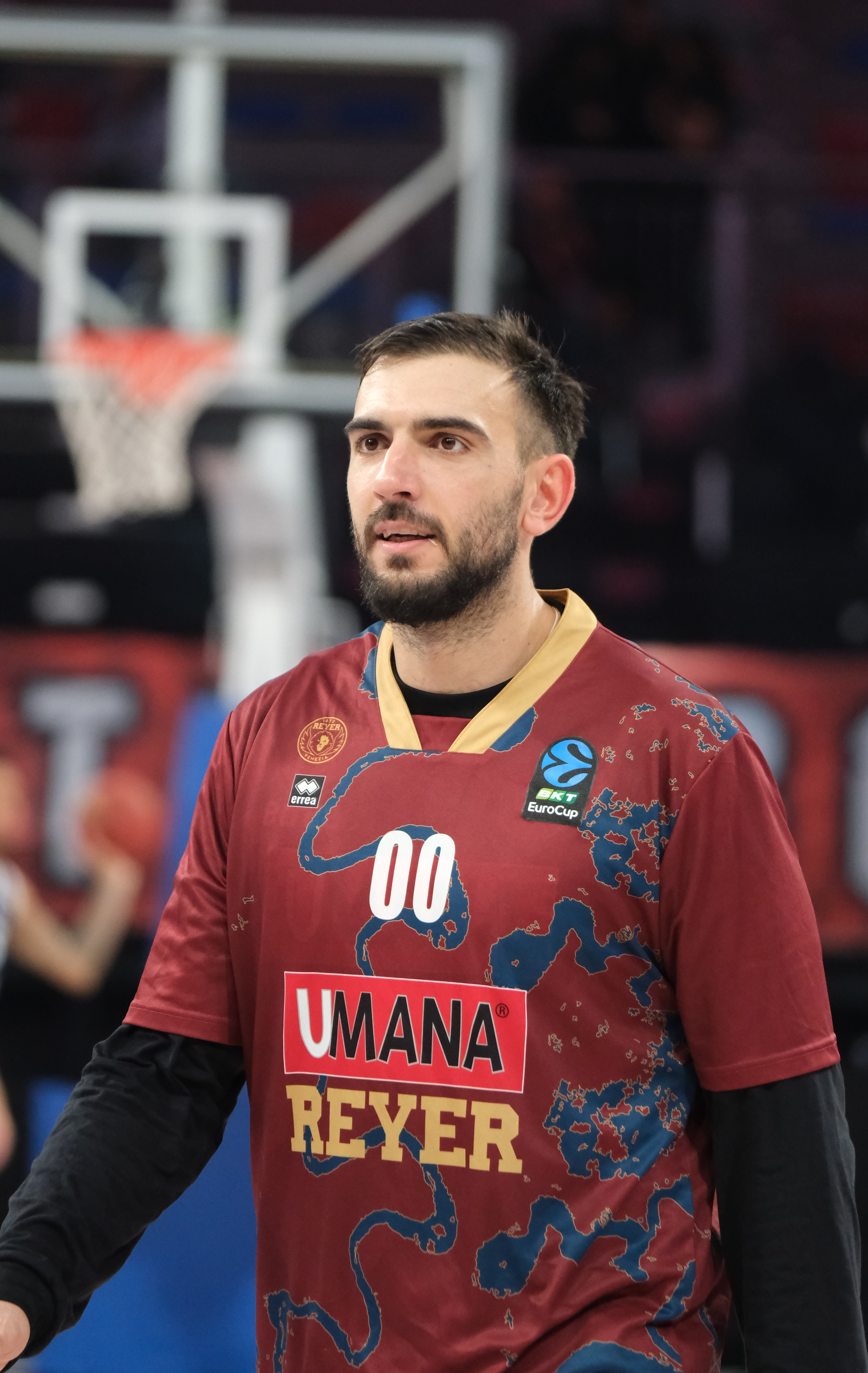
- Tessitori with Reyer Venezia in 2025

No. 00 – Umana Reyer Venezia
- Position: Center
- League: LBA; EuroCup

Personal information
- Born: 7 October 1994 (age 32) Pisa, Italy
- Listed height: 2.08 m (6 ft 10 in)
- Listed weight: 97 kg (214 lb)

Career information
- Playing career: 2010–present

Career history
- 2010–2012: Virtus Siena
- 2012–2014: Dinamo Sassari
- 2012–2013: Fulgor Libertas Forlì
- 2014–2015: JuveCaserta Basket
- 2015–2016: Pallacanestro Cantù
- 2016–2018: Pallacanestro Biella
- 2018–2020: Universo Treviso Basket
- 2020–2022: Virtus Bologna
- 2022–present: Reyer Venezia

Career highlights
- EuroCup champion (2022); Italian League champion (2021); Italian Cup winner (2014); Italian Supercup winner (2021)

Amedeo Vittorio Tessitori (born 7 October 1994) is an Italian professional basketball player for Reyer Venezia of the Italian Lega Basket Serie A (LBA), the EuroCup and the Italian National Basketball.

== Professional career ==
Tessitori was raised in the youth team of Virtus Siena Basket, where he made his first team debut in the 2010–11 season playing in the Serie A Dilettanti. In March 2011, he was nominated MVP of the 2010-11 LNP Italian Cup, won by Virtus Siena. In the 2011–12 season, he averaged 13.5 points, 7.6 rebounds and 0.6 assist.

On 17 September 2012, he was signed by Dinamo Sassari, but he was loaned to Fulgor Libertas Forlì for the 2012–13 season, where averaged 7.7 points, 4.9 rebounds and 0.3 assist. Tessitori played for Sassari in the 2013–14 season, scoring 4.3 points, with 2 rebounds and 0.3 assists.

In the 2014–15 season, Tessitori was signed by JuveCaserta Basket, where he averaged 3.0 points and 2.1 rebounds. While in the 2015–16 season, he moved to Pallacanestro Cantù, where he scored 2.2 points, 1 rebound and 0.2 assist. In the 2016–17 season, played for Pallacanestro Biella, in Serie A2, where he averaged 11.9 points, 5.9 rebounds and 0.7 assist, becoming one of the most prominent centers of the league. In the following, he even improved his averages, being able to score 14.7 points per games; he also collected 6.8 rebounds and 0.9 assist.

In the 2018–19 season, he moved Universo Treviso Basket, with which he was promoted in Serie A, scoring 12.3 points and collecting 5.3 rebounds, with 1.1 assist. After an excellent 2019–20 season in the Italian Serie A, Tessitori signed a contract with Virtus Bologna on June 5, 2020. After having knocked out 3–0 both Basket Treviso in the quarterfinals and New Basket Brindisi in the semifinals, on 11 June 2021 Virtus defeated 4–0 its historic rival Olimpia Milano in the national finals, winning its 16th national title and the first one after twenty years. On 21 September, the team won its second Supercup, defeating Olimpia Milano 90–84. Moreover, after having ousted Lietkabelis, Ulm and Valencia in the first three rounds of the playoffs, on 11 May 2022, Virtus defeated Frutti Extra Bursaspor by 80–67 at the Segafredo Arena, winning its first EuroCup and qualifying for the EuroLeague after 14 years. However, despite having ended the regular season at the first place and having ousted 3–0 both Pesaro and Tortona in the first two rounds of playoffs, Virtus was defeated 4–2 in the national finals by Olimpia Milan.

On 7 July 2022 he signed with Reyer Venezia Mestre of the Italian Lega Basket Serie A (LBA).

== National Team career ==
=== Junior team ===
Tessitori played in the 2012 FIBA Europe Under-18 Championship, where he averaged 15.3 points, 5.4 rebounds and 1.1 assists.

=== Senior team ===
Tessitori represented the Italian National Basketball team at the 2019 FIBA Basketball World Cup in China, where he averaged 6.4 points, 2.4 rebounds and 0.6 assists.
