= Steve Anderson (basketball) =

American basketball referee

Steven Anderson
- Born: May 13, 1982 (age 44); Sarasota, Florida, U.S.
- Education: University of Central Florida
- Occupation: NBA referee

Steven Anderson (born May 13, 1982) is an American professional basketball referee who worked in the National Basketball Association (NBA) for four seasons (2013–2017). He wore the uniform number 35.

Anderson resides in Orlando, Florida. He is an alumnus of the University of Central Florida, from where he received a bachelor's degree in education and a master's degree in higher education. He has been an international basketball official for FIBA since 2011.

Anderson was selected to officiate at the 2014 FIBA World Cup and worked the third-place game. He was also selected to officiate at the 2016 Summer Olympics men's basketball tournament in Rio de Janeiro, where he was the only American to referee for the men's competition.

Three years later, Anderson was selected to officiate at the 2019 FIBA World Cup, where he also worked the final. In 2021, Anderson was chosen to officiate for the 2020 Summer Olympics men's basketball tournament.
