= 2019 Serbia FIBA Basketball World Cup team =

Serbia
- Flag of Serbia
- President: Predrag Danilović
- Head coach: Aleksandar Đorđević
- Preliminary round: Group winners
- Second round: Group runners-up
- Final round: 5th place
- PIR leader: Bogdan Bogdanović 24.6
- Scoring leader: Bogdan Bogdanović 22.9
- Rebounding leader: Nikola Jokić 7.5
- Assists leader: Stefan Jović 5.4
- Biggest win: 126–67 Philippines (2 September 2019)
- Biggest defeat: 69–81 Spain (8 September 2019)
Home	Away
- All statistics correct as of September 14, 2019.

The 2019 Serbia FIBA Basketball World Cup team represented Serbia at the 2019 FIBA Basketball World Cup in China. Serbia finished the tournament in fifth place with a 6–2 record and qualified for the Olympic Qualifying Tournament.

Serbia qualified for the World Cup by taking the 3rd place in the European Second Round Group L. The team was coached by Aleksandar Đorđević, with assistant coaches Jovica Antonić, Darko Rajaković, and Miroslav Nikolić. The Serbian team won the silver medal at the previous World Cup.

This was the 3rd appearance of Serbia at the FIBA Basketball World Cup; however, FIBA considers Serbia as the successor team of FR Yugoslavia and Serbia and Montenegro who themselves qualified on three occasions. Serbia's best result is 2nd place in 2014; however, FIBA considers Serbia as the successor team of FR Yugoslavia who won 2 World Cups (1998, 2002).

At the end of the tournament, head coach Đorđević announced his decision to leave the position after six years. For his performances, guard Bogdan Bogdanović was selected to the FIBA Basketball World Cup All-Tournament Team. With 183 points scored throughout the tournament, guard Bogdanović was the FIBA Basketball World Cup Top Scorer by total points scored.

== Timeline ==
- 7 June: 34-man roster announced
- 1 July: 18-man roster announced
- 18 July: The players gathering in Belgrade
- 21 July: Start of a training camp at Kopaonik
- 4 August: The end of the training camp
- 4 August – 27 August: Exhibition games
- 20 August: Departure of the team to China
- 31 August – 15 September: 2019 FIBA Basketball World Cup

== Qualification ==
First round

Pos	Team	Pld	W	L	PF	PA	PD	Pts	Qualification
1	Germany	6	6	0	508	414	+94	12	Advance to the second round
2	Serbia	6	4	2	514	449	+65	10	Advance to the second round
3	Georgia	6	2	4	460	495	−35	8	Advance to the second round
4	Austria	6	0	6	394	518	−124	6	Relegated to the EuroBasket Pre-Qualifiers second round

Source: FIBA
Rules for classification: 1) Points; 2) Head-to-head results; 3) Points difference; 4) Points scored.

Second round

Pos	Team	Pld	W	L	PF	PA	PD	Pts	Qualification
1	Greece	12	11	1	972	880	+92	23	Qualification to the FIBA Basketball World Cup
2	Germany	12	9	3	1017	867	+150	21	Qualification to the FIBA Basketball World Cup
3	Serbia	12	7	5	993	875	+118	19	Qualification to the FIBA Basketball World Cup
4	Georgia	12	5	7	927	968	−41	17 (Note: Georgia 2–0; Israel 0–2)	Qualification to the EuroBasket Qualifiers
5	Israel	12	5	7	925	974	−49	17	Qualification to the EuroBasket Qualifiers
6	Estonia	12	4	8	821	950	−129	16	Qualification to the EuroBasket Qualifiers

Source: FIBA
Rules for classification: 1) Points; 2) Head-to-head results; 3) Points difference; 4) Points scored.

== Roster ==
On 24 May 2019, center Nikola Jokić, who earned All-NBA First Team honors, has confirmed that he will play at the World Cup. All players who won a silver medal at the 2017 EuroBasket in four European countries were included on the 34-man roster besides center Vladimir Štimac who announced his retirement from international basketball after Eurobasket at 29. Guard Branko Lazić is the only member of the 2017 Serbia roster who wasn't listed at the 18-man preliminary roster. Centers Jokić and Ognjen Kuzmić, and guard Marko Gudurić are members of the 18-man preliminary roster who didn't play a single game in the World Cup qualifications. On 1 July, the EuroLeague guard Nemanja Nedović expressed his disappointment on his cut from the 18-man preliminary roster. On 14 July, Kuzmić was involved in a serious traffic accident near Banja Luka, Bosnia and Herzegovina, in which he got life-threatening injuries. On 15 July, Kuzmić was put out from the roster due to the unpredictability of the recovery time for such injuries, so coach Aleksandar Đorđević invited center Nikola Jovanović as his substitute. On 8 August, coach Đorđević announced the preliminary 14-man roster. On 10 August, the team captain Miloš Teodosić suffered a plantar fascia injury in his left foot in the game against Lithuania and will remain in the roster until new results are known after a recovery therapy. Forward Vladimir Lučić and guard Teodosić skipped the Acropolis Tournament due to injuries. On 16 August, guard Dragan Milosavljević suffered an anterior cruciate ligament injury in his left knee in the game against Turkey. On the next day, it was announced that guard Milosavljević would not be able to play at the World Cup due to the injury. On 20 August, coach Đorđević confirmed that a guard and team captain Teodosić won't play at the World Cup, due to the injury. Center Miroslav Raduljica was selected as a new team captain due to Teodosić's inability to play on the tournament. On 29 August, coach Đorđević officially announced the final roster.

The members of Serbia roster at the EuroBasket 2017 guards Stefan Jović, Vasilije Micić, Bogdan Bogdanović, Gudurić, forwards Stefan Birčević, Lučić and center Boban Marjanović are coming back to the World Cup roster. Forward Marko Simonović and centers Raduljica and Jokić make the first appearance at a major tournament since the 2016 Summer Olympics, while forward Nemanja Bjelica and center Nikola Milutinov previously played at the EuroBasket 2015. The 2019 World Cup marked the first time since EuroBasket 2011 that the Serbia national team roster didn't contain any players from the Basketball League of Serbia (KLS).

The average height of players in the roster was 2.06 metres (6 ft 9 in) which makes the Serbians the tallest roster in the tournament. Standing at 2.21 metres (7 ft 3 in), center Marjanović was the tallest player in the tournament. The average age was 28 years old.

The following is the Serbia roster for the World Cup.

Serbia national basketball team – 2019 FIBA Basketball World Cup roster
Players
Coaches

Pos.	No.	Name	Age – Date of birth	Height	Club	Ctr.
SF	5	Marko Simonović	33 – 30 May 1986	2.03 m (6 ft 8 in)	Zenit St. Petersburg	(Russia)
SG	7	Bogdan Bogdanović	27 – 18 August 1992	1.98 m (6 ft 6 in)	Sacramento Kings	(United States)
F	8	Nemanja Bjelica	31 – 9 May 1988	2.08 m (6 ft 10 in)	Sacramento Kings	(United States)
F	11	Vladimir Lučić	30 – 17 June 1989	2.03 m (6 ft 8 in)	Bayern Munich	(Germany)
C	13	Miroslav Raduljica (C)	31 – 5 January 1988	2.13 m (7 ft 0 in)	Jiangsu Dragons	(China)
PF	14	Stefan Birčević	29 – 13 December 1989	2.10 m (6 ft 11 in)	Baskets Bonn	(Germany)
PF	15	Nikola Jokić	24 – 19 February 1995	2.13 m (7 ft 0 in)	Denver Nuggets	(United States)
C	21	Nikola Milutinov	24 – 13 December 1994	2.13 m (7 ft 0 in)	Olympiacos	(Greece)
PG	22	Vasilije Micić	25 – 13 January 1994	1.97 m (6 ft 6 in)	Anadolu Efes	(Turkey)
SG	23	Marko Gudurić	24 – 8 March 1995	2.00 m (6 ft 7 in)	Fenerbahçe	(Turkey)
PG	24	Stefan Jović	28 – 3 November 1990	1.99 m (6 ft 6 in)	Bayern Munich	(Germany)
C	51	Boban Marjanović	31 – 15 August 1988	2.21 m (7 ft 3 in)	Philadelphia 76ers	(United States)

Head coach

- (Serbia) Aleksandar Đorđević

Assistant coach(es)

- (Serbia) Miroslav Nikolić
- (Serbia) Jovica Antonić
- (Serbia) Darko Rajaković

Legend

- (C) Team captain
- Club – describes last
  club before the tournament
- Age – describes age
  on 31 August 2019

The following were candidates to make the team:

Earlier candidates
Player	Team (Note: Team at the time player was a candidate)	Added	Removed	Reason
Nikola Kalinić	(Turkey) Fenerbahçe	7 June 2019	1 July 2019	18-man roster cut
Nemanja Nedović	(Italy) Olimpia Milano	7 June 2019	1 July 2019	18-man roster cut
Ognjen Jaramaz	(Serbia) Partizan NIS	7 June 2019	1 July 2019	18-man roster cut
Ilija Đoković	(Serbia) Borac Čačak	7 June 2019	1 July 2019	18-man roster cut
Stefan Pot	(Serbia) FMP	7 June 2019	1 July 2019	18-man roster cut
Branko Lazić	(Serbia) Crvena zvezda mts	7 June 2019	1 July 2019	18-man roster cut
Vanja Marinković	(Serbia) Partizan NIS	7 June 2019	1 July 2019	18-man roster cut
Ognjen Dobrić	(Serbia) Crvena zvezda mts	7 June 2019	1 July 2019	18-man roster cut
Nemanja Dangubić	(Germany) Bayern Munich	7 June 2019	1 July 2019	18-man roster cut
Rade Zagorac	(Serbia) Partizan NIS	7 June 2019	1 July 2019	18-man roster cut
Stevan Jelovac	(Turkey) Gaziantep	7 June 2019	1 July 2019	18-man roster cut
Nikola Mišković	(Serbia) Mega Bemax	7 June 2019	1 July 2019	18-man roster cut
Boriša Simanić	(Serbia) Crvena zvezda mts	7 June 2019	1 July 2019	18-man roster cut
Dragan Apić	(Russia) Lokomotiv Kuban	7 June 2019	1 July 2019	18-man roster cut
Dejan Kravić	(Italy) Virtus Bologna	7 June 2019	1 July 2019	18-man roster cut
Ognjen Kuzmić	(Spain) Real Madrid	7 June 2019	15 July 2019	Injured
Milan Mačvan	(Germany) Bayern Munich	7 June 2019	3 August 2019	Drop out
Dejan Todorović	(Spain) UCAM Murcia	7 June 2019	8 August 2019	Roster cut
Aleksa Avramović	(Italy) Varese	7 June 2019	8 August 2019	Roster cut
Nikola Jovanović	(Italy) Dolomiti Energia Trento	7 June 2019	8 August 2019	Roster cut
Dragan Milosavljević	(Spain) Unicaja	7 June 2019	16 August 2019	Injured
Miloš Teodosić	(United States) Los Angeles Clippers	7 June 2019	20 August 2019	Injured

=== Depth chart ===
Pos.	Starting 5	Bench 1	Bench 2
C	Nikola Milutinov	Boban Marjanović	Miroslav Raduljica
PF	Nikola Jokić	Nemanja Bjelica	Stefan Birčević
SF	Vladimir Lučić	Marko Simonović
SG	Bogdan Bogdanović	Marko Gudurić
PG	Stefan Jović	Vasilije Micić

== Staff ==
On 18 July, Darko Rajaković was hired as an assistant coach, joining the staff as a replacement for Milan Minić. On 20 August, physiotherapist Marko Sokić returned to the staff.

Position	Staff member	Age	Team
Head coach	(Serbia) Aleksandar Đorđević	52	(Italy) Segafredo Virtus Bologna
Assistant coaches	(Serbia) Jovica Antonić	53	(Serbia) Konstantin
Assistant coaches	(Serbia) Miroslav Nikolić	63	—
Assistant coaches	(Serbia) Darko Rajaković	40	(United States) Phoenix Suns
Team manager	(Serbia) Nebojša Ilić	51	(Serbia) Crvena zvezda mts
Conditioning coaches	(Serbia) Denis Krdžalić	—	—
Conditioning coaches	(Serbia) Mladen Mihajlović	34	(Italy) Segafredo Virtus Bologna
Scouts	(Serbia) Dragan Popov	—	—
Scouts	(Serbia) Goran Topić	52	—
Physicians	(Serbia) Dragan Radovanović	—	—
Physicians	(Serbia) Milan Mirković	—	—
Physiotherapists	(Serbia) Dušan Sajić	—	—
Physiotherapists	(Serbia) Velibor Kosanović	—	—
Physiotherapists	(Serbia) Marko Sokić	—	—
Equipment manager	(Serbia) Jovica Aničić	—	—
Press officer	(Serbia) Vladimir Sibinović	—	—

Age – describes age on 31 August 2019

Source: KSS

== Uniform ==
- Supplier: Peak
- Main sponsor: Ganten
- Back sponsor: Triglav (below number)
- Shorts sponsor: mts

Home	Away

== Exhibition games ==
The Serbia roster played ten exhibition games and went undefeated at 10–0. They began its exhibition schedule with three domestic games and went undefeated. The game with Lithuania in Belgrade had charity cause. The Basketball Federation of Serbia donated a percentage of the ticket sale revenue to a UNICEF project in Serbia. On 13 August, it's announced that 5.374 million Serbian dinars have to be donated to the UNICEF project. Serbia played at the 2019 Acropolis of Athens Tournament together with Greece, Italy, and Turkey from 16–18 August. The Serbia roster went undefeated at 3–0 in Athens and won the Acropolis Tournament. Last games was held from 23–27 August at the 2019 Austiger Cup in Shenyang where they faced France, Italy, and New Zealand. Also, the Serbia roster went undefeated and won the Austiger Cup.

4 August 2019
18:30 (UTC+1)

Report 1 Report 2

Borac Čačak (Serbia)	66–97	Serbia
Scoring by quarter: 24–30, 13–28, 12–20, 17–19
Pts: Čarapić, Kočović 14; Rebs: not available Asts: not available		Pts: Bjelica 19; Rebs: Marjanović 7 Asts: Teodosić 6

Borac Hall, Čačak
Attendance: 3,000
Referees: Milivoje Jovčić, Radoš Arsenijević, Ivan Stefanović

7 August 2019
21:00 (UTC+1)

Report 1 Report 2

Serbia	95–75	Finland
Scoring by quarter: 28–25, 26–11, 24–24, 17–15
Pts: Jović, Marjanović 12; Rebs: Milutinov 11; Asts: Teodosić 7		Pts: Valtonen 12; Rebs: Kotti 4 Asts: Huff 5

Crystal Hall, Zrenjanin
Attendance: 3,055
Referees: Milivoje Jovčić, Vladimir Jevtović, Aleksandar Glišić

10 August 2019
21:00 (UTC+1)

Report Boxscore

Serbia	72–68	Lithuania
Scoring by quarter: 14–23, 20–17, 22–19, 16–9
Pts: Bogdanović 16; Rebs: Jokić 6 Asts: three players 3		Pts: Grigonis 18; Rebs: Valančiūnas 6 Asts: Kalnietis 10

Štark Arena, Belgrade
Attendance: 18,213
Referees: Milivoje Jovčić, Radoš Arsenijević, Petar Pešić

12 August 2019
20:00 (UTC+2)

Boxscore

Lithuania	91–95	Serbia
Scoring by quarter: 22–20, 15–25, 34–24, 20–26
Pts: Valančiūnas 18; Rebs: Valančiūnas 7 Asts: Seibutis 4		Pts: Bogdanović 27; Rebs: Jokić 5 Asts: Micić 7

Žalgiris Arena, Kaunas
Attendance: 7,285
Referees: Jurgis Laurinavičius, Gytis Vilius, Gvidas Gedvilas

Acropolis Cup

16 August 2019
18:00 (UTC+2)

Boxscore

Serbia	87–72	Turkey
Scoring by quarter: 25–18, 19–18, 27–18, 16–18
Pts: Jokić 18; Rebs: Jokić 11; Asts: Jović 8		Pts: Korkmaz 16; Rebs: Osman 8 Asts: Osman 5

O.A.C.A. Olympic Hall, Athens
Attendance: not available
Referees: Chrysostomos Schinas, Nikolaos Somos, Nikolaos Tziopanos

17 August 2019
18:00 (UTC+2)

Boxscore

Italy	64–96	Serbia
Scoring by quarter: 15–14, 17–31, 17–24, 15–27
Pts: Belinelli 16; Rebs: Tessitori 5 Asts: Biligha, Vitali 3		Pts: Jokić 20; Rebs: Bjelica, Marjanović 7 Asts: Micić 5

O.A.C.A. Olympic Hall, Athens
Attendance: not available
Referees: Chrysostomos Schinas, Vasiliki Tsaroucha, Anastasios Kardaris

18 August 2019
20:30 (UTC+2)

Boxscore

Greece	80–85 (OT)	Serbia
Scoring by quarter: 19–17, 19–14, 19–21, 15–20, Overtime: 8–13
Pts: G. Antetokounmpo 20; Rebs: Bourousis 6 Asts: Calathes 7		Pts: Bogdanović 28; Rebs: Bjelica 14; Asts: Jović 6

O.A.C.A. Olympic Hall, Athens
Attendance: 18,000
Referees: Elias Koromilas, Vasiliki Tsaroucha, Nikolaos Pitsilkas

AusTiger Cup

23 August 2019
19:30 (UTC+8)

Report 1 Report 2

Serbia	71–65	Italy
Scoring by quarter: 27–17, 20–17, 12–14, 12–17
Pts: Bogdanović 15; Rebs: Milutinov 7 Asts: Micić 3		Pts: Belinelli 18; Rebs: Abass, Gallinari 6 Asts: Hackett 3

Liaoning Gymnasium, Shenyang
Attendance: 2,000
Referees: not available

25 August 2019
19:30 (UTC+8)

Report

New Zealand	78–88	Serbia
Scoring by quarter: 16–25, 26–28, 8–15, 28–20
Pts: T. Webster 16; Rebs: T. Webster, Loe 5 Asts: C. Webster 4		Pts: Milutinov 19; Rebs: Jokić 11; Asts: Micić 9

Anshan Olympic Sports Center Gymnasium, Anshan
Attendance: not available
Referees: not available

27 August 2019
19:30 (UTC+8)

Boxscore Report

Serbia	61–56	France
Scoring by quarter: 14–17, 9–15, 23–16, 15–8
Pts: Raduljica 13; Rebs: Jokić 8 Asts: Jović 3		Pts: Batum 9 Rebs: Lacombe 7 Asts: four players 2

Liaoning Gymnasium, Shenyang
Attendance: not available
Referees: Xing Jin Ming (CHN), Martin Davison (NZL), Beniamino Attard (ITA)

== Tournament ==
The 2019 FIBA Basketball World Cup is the 18th tournament of the FIBA Basketball World Cup championship that is organized by FIBA.

=== Preliminary round ===
Serbia was drawn into Group D with Angola, Italy, and the Philippines and played all of its group phase matches in Foshan at the Foshan International Sports and Cultural Center from 31 August to 4 September.

Pos	Team	Pld	W	L	PF	PA	PD	Pts	Qualification
1	Serbia	3	3	0	323	203	+120	6	Second round
2	Italy	3	2	1	277	215	+62	5	Second round
3	Angola	3	1	2	204	278	−74	4	17th–32nd classification
4	Philippines	3	0	3	210	318	−108	3	17th–32nd classification

Source: FIBA
Rules for classification: Tiebreakers

All times are local UTC+8.

==== Angola ====
This was the second game between Angola and Serbia in the World Cup. The Serbians won the first meeting in 2010. The Serbians won in the 2016 FIBA World Olympic Qualifying Tournament, the last competitive game between the two teams.

31 August 2019
15:30

Boxscore

Angola	59–105	Serbia
Scoring by quarter: 20–29, 12–21, 15–28, 12–27
Pts: Morais 15; Rebs: Joaquim 5 Asts: seven players 1		Pts: Bogdanović 24; Rebs: Marjanović 10; Asts: Jović 9

Foshan International Sports and Cultural Center, Foshan
Attendance: 11,000
Referees: Guilherme Locatelli (BRA), Mārtiņš Kozlovskis (LAT), Scott Beker (AUS)

Forward Nemanja Bjelica missed the game due to a knee injury. Center Miroslav Raduljica made his 100th appearance for the national team.

Starters:			Pts	Reb	Ast
PG	1	Gerson Domingos	6	2	0
SG	6	Carlos Morais	15	2	1
SF	10	Jose Antonio	6	0	0
PF	6	Reggie Moore	6	4	1
C	2	Yanick Moreira	8	4	1
Reserves:					
SG	3	Jerson Gonçalves	0	0	1
SF	4	Olímpio Cipriano	0	0	0
PF	9	Leonel Paulo	10	0	1
PF	15	Eduardo Mingas	2	0	0
C	16	Hermenegildo Mbunga	0	1	1
C	32	Valdelício Joaquim	6	5	1
PG	37	Jacques Conceição	0	0	0
Head coach:
(United States) Will Voigt

Angola	Serbia

Angola	Statistics	Serbia
13/33 (39%)	2-pt field goals	23/35 (66%)
8/26 (31%)	3-pt field goals	13/20 (65%)
9/13 (69%)	Free throws	20/25 (80%)
6	Offensive rebounds	9
13	Defensive rebounds	32
19	Total rebounds	41
7	Assists	32
16	Turnovers	16
5	Steals	7
3	Blocks	1
24	Fouls	13

Starters:			Pts	Reb	Ast
PG	24	Stefan Jović	5	4	9
SG	7	Bogdan Bogdanović	24	2	3
SF	5	Marko Simonović	5	3	1
PF	14	Stefan Birčević	7	4	2
C	51	Boban Marjanović	12	10	0
Reserves:					
F	8	Nemanja Bjelica	DNP		
F	11	Vladimir Lučić	7	2	0
C	13	Miroslav Raduljica	0	1	2
PF	15	Nikola Jokić	14	5	6
C	21	Nikola Milutinov	14	3	0
PG	22	Vasilije Micić	8	2	6
SG	23	Marko Gudurić	9	1	3
Head coach:
(Serbia) Aleksandar Đorđević

- TCL Player of the Game: Bogdan Bogdanović

==== Philippines ====
This was the first competitive game between Serbia and the Philippines.

2 September 2019
19:30

Boxscore

Serbia	126–67	Philippines
Scoring by quarter: 28–13, 34–22, 37–13, 27–19
Pts: Bjelica 20; Rebs: Jokić 7 Asts: Jokić, Micić 7		Pts: Perez 16; Rebs: Fajardo 6 Asts: Blatche 6

Foshan International Sports and Cultural Center, Foshan
Attendance: 10,000
Referees: Guilherme Locatelli (BRA), Yu Jung (TPE), Yohan Rosso (FRA)

Serbia had a slow start to the game and the Philippines tried to grow in the confidence. Tied at 7-all with six minutes left in the opening quarter, center Nikola Jokić came off the bench and the Serbian offense started to roll. The Serbs used a 7–0 run to close the first 10 minutes with a 25–13 lead. Forward Nemanja Bjelica came off the bench making all 7 of his field-goal attempts, including 3 three-pointers to finish with a game-high 20 points in just 16 minutes of action. Serbia not only out-rebounded Philippines 37–23, but they finished with 37 assists against Philippines' 14.

This is the game won by largest points margin at 59 for the Serbians at any of major tournaments since 2006. With 37 team assists Serbia set the World Cup record for the most assists in a single game.

Starters:			Pts	Reb	Ast
PG	22	Vasilije Micić	11	2	7
SG	7	Bogdan Bogdanović	17	2	5
F	11	Vladimir Lučić	4	4	1
PF	14	Stefan Birčević	6	3	1
C	21	Nikola Milutinov	10	2	0
Reserves:					
SF	5	Marko Simonović	7	3	0
F	8	Nemanja Bjelica	20	2	1
C	13	Miroslav Raduljica	13	4	4
PF	15	Nikola Jokić	11	7	7
SG	23	Marko Gudurić	12	1	2
PG	24	Stefan Jović	6	4	4
C	51	Boban Marjanović	9	2	3
Head coach:
(Serbia) Aleksandar Đorđević

Serbia

Philippines

Serbia	Statistics	Philippines
36/42 (86%)	2-pt field goals	21/43 (49%)
12/22 (55%)	3-pt field goals	4/24 (17%)
18/22 (82%)	Free throws	13/18 (72%)
5	Offensive rebounds	11
32	Defensive rebounds	12
37	Total rebounds	23
37	Assists	14
13	Turnovers	14
9	Steals	7
3	Blocks	1
16	Fouls	25

Starters:			Pts	Reb	Ast
PG	3	Paul Dalistan	15	1	1
SF	18	Troy Rosario	2	3	0
SF	5	Gabe Norwood	0	1	0
PF	25	Japeth Aguilar	7	4	1
C	1	Andray Blatche	5	4	6
Reserves:					
PG	4	Kiefer Ravena	5	0	0
SG	8	Robert Bolick	7	1	1
PG	14	Mark Barroca	DNP		
C	15	June Mar Fajardo	8	6	2
SG	16	Roger Pogoy	2	1	0
SG	17	CJ Perez	16	0	3
PF	20	Raymond Almazan	0	0	0
Head coach:
(Philippines) Yeng Guiao

- TCL Player of the Game: Nemanja Bjelica

==== Italy ====
This was the first game between Italy and Serbia in the World Cup. Serbia won in its last competitive game against Italy, in EuroBasket 2017.

4 September 2019
19:30

Boxscore

Italy	77–92	Serbia
Scoring by quarter: 23–28, 19–22, 15–20, 20–22
Pts: Gallinari 26; Rebs: Gallinari 8 Asts: Belinelli 4		Pts: Bogdanović 31; Rebs: Bjelica 7 Asts: Bjelica 9

Foshan International Sports and Cultural Center, Foshan
Attendance: 15,000
Referees: Steve Anderson (USA), Yohan Rosso (FRA), Yu Jung (TPE)

The game with Italy kicked off pretty tie, and after a 3-pointer from Bogdan Bogdanović in the 3rd minute, the score tied the game at 8-all. After the third straight 3-pointer from Bogdanović in the 5th minute, the score was 13–10. In the 7th minute, after a 3-pointer from Stefan Jović and points from Nikola Jokić, the score was 20–14. After Boban Marjanović scored 2 free throws and got the lead up to 7 with a minute left in the first quarter, 26–19. The first quarter ended with Serbia's 28–23 lead. In the second quarter, the Serbians played better and controlled the game, while the Italians kept up with 3-pointers. After two good plays and a 3-pointers by Jović and Bogdanović, Serbia led 39–29 in the 14th minute. Thereafter, the Italians had the 5–0 run. After a layup by Vasilije Micić, with 3 minutes remaining in the first half, the lead was back up to 10 points for Serbia, 48–38. At the half time, Serbia led 50–42. At the start of the third quarter, the Italians have caught up with a series of 3-pointers and cut the lead down to 55–53 for Serbia. With a good defense, the Serbians held up them from getting the lead. So the Serbians lead was going up and down from 2 to 6 points. In those moments, Miroslav Raduljica got fouled three times in a row and Bogdanović right after, so the Serbians got the lead back up to 10 point from a free throw line at 64–54. Nemanja Bjelica scored for the 13 points lead at 70–57 by the end of the third quarter. At the beginning of the last quarter, Italy had a 5–0 run and got back into the game, before Bogdanović made a 3-pointer and Raduljica scored from a free throw resisted the comeback at 76–62. Thereafter, Bogdanović had a steal and scored for 15 points lead at 80–65 within 6 minutes remaining. A minute later Bjelica made a 3-pointer, then Bogdanović had another steal and passed it to Vladimir Lučić who scored for the 85–67 Serbian lead at 4:30 minutes remaining. Bogdanović made another 3-pointer and got the lead up to 23 points at 90:67. Bogdanović scored a career-high 31 points and led all Serbs with 36 minutes played as Serbia won 92–77 over Italy.

Starters:			Pts	Reb	Ast
PG	10	Daniel Hackett	13	3	1
SG	3	Marco Belinelli	15	2	4
SF	70	Luigi Datome	5	4	3
PF	8	Danilo Gallinari	26	8	1
C	6	Paul Biligha	0	2	0
Reserves:					
SG	00	Amedeo Della Valle	0	0	0
SF	5	Alessandro Gentile	11	1	1
PG	7	Luca Vitali	0	0	0
PG	12	Ariel Filloy	DNP		
PF	15	Jeff Brooks	2	2	0
C	16	Amedeo Tessitori	0	0	0
SF	23	Awudu Abass	5	1	1
Head coach:
(Italy) Romeo Sacchetti

Italy

Serbia

Italy	Statistics	Serbia
11/25 (44%)	2-pt field goals	17/35 (49%)
11/26 (42%)	3-pt field goals	10/24 (42%)
22/30 (70%)	Free throws	28/34 (82%)
8	Offensive rebounds	13
19	Defensive rebounds	22
27	Total rebounds	35
11	Assists	24
17	Turnovers	15
7	Steals	9
0	Blocks	2
26	Fouls	30

Starters:			Pts	Reb	Ast
PG	24	Stefan Jović	11	6	3
SG	7	Bogdan Bogdanović	31	4	5
SF	11	Vladimir Lučić	2	1	1
PF	14	Stefan Birčević	0	0	0
C	21	Nikola Milutinov	4	0	0
Reserves:					
SF	5	Marko Simonović	0	1	0
F	8	Nemanja Bjelica	5	7	9
C	13	Miroslav Raduljica	12	2	1
PF	15	Nikola Jokić	15	6	4
PG	22	Vasilije Micić	6	0	0
SG	23	Marko Gudurić	0	2	1
C	51	Boban Marjanović	6	1	0
Head coach:
(Serbia) Aleksandar Đorđević

- TCL Player of the Game: Bogdan Bogdanović

=== Second round ===
Serbia finished as the group winner in its preliminary group and advanced to the second round of the FIBA Basketball World Cup. It played against two top finishers of Group C, Spain and Puerto Rico, in Wuhan at the Wuhan Sports Center Gymnasium from 6–8 September. Serbia finished as the runner-up in its second-round group and advance to the quarter-finals.

Pos	Team	Pld	W	L	PF	PA	PD	Pts	Qualification
1	Spain	5	5	0	395	319	+76	10	Quarter-finals
2	Serbia	5	4	1	482	331	+151	9	Quarter-finals
3	Italy	5	3	2	431	371	+60	8	
4	Puerto Rico	5	2	3	349	402	−53	7	

Source: FIBA
Rules for classification: Tiebreakers

All times are local UTC+8.

==== Puerto Rico ====
This was the first game between Puerto Rico and Serbia in the World Cup. Serbia won in its last competitive game against Puerto Rico, in the 2016 FIBA World Olympic Qualifying Tournament.

6 September 2019
16:30

Boxscore

Serbia	90–47	Puerto Rico
Scoring by quarter: 23–14, 26–12, 22–13, 19–8
Pts: Bjelica 18; Rebs: Jokić 10; Asts: Jović 9		Pts: Huertas 20; Rebs: Collier, Rodríguez 5 Asts: Rodríguez 4

Wuhan Sports Center Gymnasium, Wuhan
Referees: Cristiano Maranho (BRA), Mārtiņš Kozlovskis (LAT), Zdenko Tomašovič (SVK)

Nemanja Bjelica led all scorers with 18 points off the bench, Nikola Jokić contributed 14 points and 10 rebounds, Boban Marjanović impressed 16 points, while David Huertas - the only Puerto Rican to score in double digits - finished with 11 points.

Starters:			Pts	Reb	Ast
PG	24	Stefan Jović	2	3	9
SG	7	Bogdan Bogdanović	5	2	5
F	11	Vladimir Lučić	4	6	1
PF	14	Stefan Birčević	12	7	0
C	51	Boban Marjanović	16	4	1
Reserves:					
SF	5	Marko Simonović	5	0	1
F	8	Nemanja Bjelica	18	6	3
C	13	Miroslav Raduljica	4	1	0
PF	15	Nikola Jokić	14	10	1
C	21	Nikola Milutinov	0	3	0
PG	22	Vasilije Micić	0	1	8
SG	23	Marko Gudurić	10	1	1
Head coach:
(Serbia) Aleksandar Đorđević

Serbia	Puerto Rico

Serbia	Statistics	Puerto Rico
24/32 (75%)	2-pt field goals	15/40 (38%)
10/29 (34%)	3-pt field goals	2/24 (8%)
12/16 (75%)	Free throws	11/11 (100%)
11	Offensive rebounds	8
37	Defensive rebounds	18
48	Total rebounds	26
30	Assists	11
17	Turnovers	16
9	Steals	10
4	Blocks	1
16	Fouls	19

Starters:			Pts	Reb	Ast
PG	9	Gary Browne	2	0	2
SG	33	David Huertas	11	0	3
G/F	42	Alex Franklin	0	3	0
F	34	Renaldo Balkman	4	1	1
C	12	Jorge Díaz	2	0	0
Reserves:					
F	0	Isaiah Pineiro	6	3	0
PF	1	Ramón Clemente	0	0	0
PF	7	Devon Collier	8	5	0
PG	13	Ángel Rodríguez	3	5	4
G	24	Gian Clavell	7	1	2
C	43	Chris Brady	2	3	0
G	44	Javier Mojica	2	0	0
Head coach:
(Puerto Rico) Eddie Casiano

- TCL Player of the Game: Boban Marjanović

==== Spain ====
This was the third match between Spain and Serbia in the World Cup, with both teams winning once in previous matches. Serbia won in its last competitive game against Spain, in EuroBasket 2015 group stage.

8 September 2019
20:30

Boxscore

Spain	81–69	Serbia
Scoring by quarter: 13–20, 32–17, 22–19, 14–13
Pts: Rubio 19; Rebs: Claver 7 Asts: Gasol 6		Pts: Bogdanović 26; Rebs: Bogdanović 10; Asts: Bogdanović 6

Wuhan Sports Center Gymnasium, Wuhan
Referees: Cristiano Maranho (BRA), Steve Anderson (USA), Omar Bermúdez (MEX)

Center Nikola Jokić was ejected after two successive technical fouls with 6:40 minutes left in the third quarter. Guard Ricky Rubio paced Spain with an individual World Cup high 19 points while Victor Claver chipped in 14 points, 7 rebounds, 3 steals and 2 blocks and Marc Gasol picked up 11 points, 6 rebounds and 6 assists after just 2 points in his last game as Spain remained perfect at 5–0. Serbia came into the game having averaged 103.3 points and holding their opponents to just 62.5 points. But Spain also had averaged just 62.5 points allowed and Serbia could not solve the Spaniards despite Bogdan Bogdanović scoring a game-high 26 points to go with 10 rebounds and 6 assists.

Starters:			Pts	Reb	Ast
PG	9	Ricky Rubio	19	5	4
SF	5	Rudy Fernández	7	1	2
PF	41	Juan Hernangómez	3	4	1
PF	18	Pierre Oriola	6	1	1
C	13	Marc Gasol	11	6	6
Reserves:					
PG	1	Quino Colom	DNP		
SG	8	Pau Ribas	5	3	2
PF	10	Víctor Claver	14	7	2
C	14	Willy Hernangómez	7	4	0
SF	22	Xavi Rabaseda	DNP		
SG	23	Sergio Llull	9	0	3
SF	33	Javier Beirán	DNP		
Head coach:
(Italy) Sergio Scariolo

Spain	Serbia

Spain	Statistics	Serbia
16/30 (53%)	2-pt field goals	18/33 (55%)
9/29 (31%)	3-pt field goals	3/19 (16%)
22/26 (85%)	Free throws	24/27 (89%)
13	Offensive rebounds	11
22	Defensive rebounds	22
35	Total rebounds	33
21	Assists	15
13	Turnovers	17
11	Steals	7
5	Blocks	2
25	Fouls	24

Starters:			Pts	Reb	Ast
PG	24	Stefan Jović	4	1	3
SG	7	Bogdan Bogdanović	26	10	6
SF	11	Vladimir Lučić	8	3	0
PF	14	Stefan Birčević	3	0	0
C	21	Nikola Milutinov	7	2	0
Reserves:					
SF	5	Marko Simonović	0	0	0
F	8	Nemanja Bjelica	3	3	1
C	13	Miroslav Raduljica	7	2	3
PF	15	Nikola Jokić	6	5	1
PG	22	Vasilije Micić	5	3	1
SG	23	Marko Gudurić	0	2	0
C	51	Boban Marjanović	0	0	0
Head coach:
(Serbia) Aleksandar Đorđević

- TCL Player of the Game: Ricky Rubio (Spain)

=== Final round ===
Serbia finished as the runner-up in its second-round group and advance to the quarter-finals of the FIBA Basketball World Cup and played against the winner of Group I, which is Argentina, in Dongguan at the Dongfeng Nissan Cultural and Sports Centre on 10 September. After the defeat in the quarterfinals, Serbia played the classification semi-finals with the United States, who lost to France, in Dongguan on 12 September. After the win over the United States, Serbia won over Czech Republic in the fifth-place match in Beijing at the Wukesong Arena on 14 September.

All times are local UTC+8.

==== Quarter-finals ====
This was the second game between Argentina and Serbia in the World Cup. The Serbians won the first meeting in 2010.

10 September 2019
19:00

Boxscore

Argentina	97–87	Serbia
Scoring by quarter: 25–23, 29–26, 14–18, 29–20
Pts: Scola 20; Rebs: Deck 8 Asts: Campazzo 12		Pts: Bogdanović 21; Rebs: Jokić 10; Asts: Jokić 5

Dongfeng Nissan Cultural and Sports Centre, Dongguan
Referees: Cristiano Maranho (BRA), Tolga Şahin (ITA), Michael Weiland (CAN)

Argentina were up for most of the game, but it was their response when Serbia took the lead at the start of the fourth that was impressive. Back-to-back and-one plays by Nicolás Laprovíttola and Luis Scola made it an 87–76 game with just over three minutes to play. That seemed to break Serbian spirits, there was no comeback by the team that had Nikola Jokić, Bogdan Bogdanović, Boban Marjanović and all the other stars here. Facundo Campazzo had 18 points, 12 assists, 6 rebounds and 3 steals, becoming the first man with 15+ points, 10+ assists, 5+ rebounds and 3+ steals since Croatia's Toni Kukoč, who did it against Canada in 1994.

Starters:			Pts	Reb	Ast
PG	7	Facundo Campazzo	8	6	12
SF	29	Patricio Garino	15	1	1
SF	9	Nicolás Brussino	4	1	0
PF	4	Luis Scola	20	5	2
C	12	Marcos Delía	4	1	0
Reserves:					
C	1	Agustín Caffaro	0	1	0
PG	3	Luca Vildoza	11	1	3
PG	8	Nicolás Laprovíttola	8	2	3
SG	10	Máximo Fjellerup	2	0	0
PF	14	Gabriel Deck	13	8	1
SG	25	Lucio Redivo	DNP		
PF	83	Tayavek Gallizzi	2	0	0
Head coach:
(Argentina) Sergio Hernández

Argentina	Serbia

Argentina	Statistics	Serbia
24/40 (60%)	2-pt field goals	20/39 (51%)
12/27 (44%)	3-pt field goals	8/28 (29%)
13/17 (76%)	Free throws	23/28 (82%)
8	Offensive rebounds	18
21	Defensive rebounds	24
29	Total rebounds	42
22	Assists	17
14	Turnovers	16
10	Steals	8
3	Blocks	6
25	Fouls	22

Starters:			Pts	Reb	Ast
PG	24	Stefan Jović	7	3	5
SG	7	Bogdan Bogdanović	21	4	2
SF	11	Vladimir Lučić	12	3	1
PF	15	Nikola Jokić	16	10	5
C	13	Miroslav Raduljica	0	1	0
Reserves:					
SF	5	Marko Simonović	3	2	0
F	8	Nemanja Bjelica	18	7	2
PF	14	Stefan Birčević	DNP		
C	21	Nikola Milutinov	0	1	0
PG	22	Vasilije Micić	5	3	1
SG	23	Marko Gudurić	5	0	1
C	51	Boban Marjanović	0	0	0
Head coach:
(Serbia) Aleksandar Đorđević

- TCL Player of the Game: Facundo Campazzo (Argentina)

==== Classification semi-finals ====
This was the second game between Serbia and the United States in the World Cup. The Americans won the 2014 FIBA Basketball World Cup Final. Also, the Americans won in the 2016 Summer Olympics Final, the last competitive game between the two teams.

12 September 2019
19:00

Boxscore

Serbia	94–89	United States
Scoring by quarter: 32–7, 12–33, 27–28, 23–21
Pts: Bogdanović 28; Rebs: Bjelica 5 Asts: Jokić 7		Pts: Barnes 22; Rebs: Middleton 6 Asts: Walker 8

Dongfeng Nissan Cultural and Sports Centre, Dongguan
Referees: Cristiano Maranho (BRA), Yu Jung (TPE), Luis Castillo (ESP)

Serbia shot the lights out in the first period in Dongguan, connecting eight times from beyond the arc for a 32–7 lead heading into the second quarter. The Americans found their groove, though, dominated the second stanza and trailed by just four points at the half. Serbia led by just three points at the beginning of the final period, but behind Vladimir Lučić, Vasilije Micić and Boban Marjanović, they erected a 13-point lead with just 4:43 left. Team USA would still try to make a late comeback, trimming the lead to as little as four points, but it was all for nothing as the Serbians proved steadier down the stretch. It remained nip-and-tuck for much of the second half before the Serbians rebuilt their double-digit lead in the fourth period and successfully kept the Americans at bay. Bogdan Bogdanović and Lučić combined for 43 points to lead Serbia, while Harrison Barnes had 22 for the United States.

Starters:			Pts	Reb	Ast
PG	24	Stefan Jović	9	3	4
SG	7	Bogdan Bogdanović	28	4	6
F	11	Vladimir Lučić	15	4	1
PF	15	Nikola Jokić	9	3	7
C	21	Nikola Milutinov	7	2	2
Reserves:					
SF	5	Marko Simonović	0	4	0
F	8	Nemanja Bjelica	8	5	2
C	13	Miroslav Raduljica	DNP		
PF	14	Stefan Birčević	DNP		
PG	22	Vasilije Micić	10	3	3
SG	23	Marko Gudurić	DNP		
C	51	Boban Marjanović	8	3	1
Head coach:
(Serbia) Aleksandar Đorđević

Serbia	United States

Serbia	Statistics	United States
18/32 (56%)	2-pt field goals	20/40 (50%)
15/31 (48%)	3-pt field goals	11/31 (35%)
13/19 (68%)	Free throws	16/20 (80%)
8	Offensive rebounds	15
25	Defensive rebounds	26
33	Total rebounds	41
26	Assists	20
6	Turnovers	5
3	Steals	4
2	Blocks	3
22	Fouls	18

Starters:			Pts	Reb	Ast
PG	15	Kemba Walker	18	4	8
SG	5	Donovan Mitchell	9	5	4
G/F	6	Joe Harris	4	3	1
F	8	Harrison Barnes	22	5	4
C	12	Myles Turner	10	5	0
Reserves:					
PG	4	Derrick White	2	0	0
G	7	Marcus Smart	DNP		
G/F	9	Jaylen Brown	4	3	0
SF	10	Jayson Tatum	DNP		
F/C	11	Mason Plumlee	2	3	2
C	13	Brook Lopez	2	2	0
G/F	14	Khris Middleton	16	6	1
Head coach:
(United States) Gregg Popovich

- TCL Player of the Game: Bogdan Bogdanović

==== Fifth place match ====
This was the first game between the Czech Republic and Serbia in the World Cup. Serbia won in its last competitive game against the Czech Republic, in the 2016 FIBA World Olympic Qualifying Tournament.

14 September 2019
20:00

Boxscore

Serbia	90–81	Czech Republic
Scoring by quarter: 20–20, 21–30, 28–12, 21–19
Pts: Bogdanović 31; Rebs: Jokić 14; Asts: Jokić 7		Pts: Auda 16; Rebs: Balvín 10; Asts: Satoranský 6

Wukesong Arena, Beijing
Referees: Guilherme Locatelli (BRA), Georgios Poursanidis (GRE), Michael Weiland (CAN)

Behind a stingy defense and terrific perimeter shooting, Czech Republic erected a 50–41 lead at the half, but the Serbians got their act together in the last two periods to register their sixth win. Bogdan Bogdanović had the hot hand for Serbia with 31 points, and he was assisted well by Nikola Milutinov, who had 14. The Czechs, meanwhile, drew 16 points from Patrik Auda. Staring at a nine-point half-time deficit was not in Serbia's plans, but they rose to the occasion and turned the tables on the Czech Republic in the third quarter. The Serbians outscored their foes, 28–12, in that span to retake the lead for good.

Starters:			Pts	Reb	Ast
PG	24	Stefan Jović	12	7	6
SG	7	Bogdan Bogdanović	31	4	3
F	11	Vladimir Lučić	5	1	2
PF	15	Nikola Jokić	7	14	7
C	21	Nikola Milutinov	14	7	2
Reserves:					
SF	5	Marko Simonović	4	0	0
F	8	Nemanja Bjelica	3	2	1
C	13	Miroslav Raduljica	7	3	1
PF	14	Stefan Birčević	1	3	0
PG	22	Vasilije Micić	0	0	0
SG	23	Marko Gudurić	3	1	0
C	51	Boban Marjanović	3	1	0
Head coach:
(Serbia) Aleksandar Đorđević

Serbia	Czech Rep.

Serbia	Statistics	Czech Rep.
23/38 (61%)	2-pt field goals	17/42 (41%)
10/27 (37%)	3-pt field goals	12/32 (38%)
14/19 (74%)	Free throws	11/13 (85%)
11	Offensive rebounds	12
32	Defensive rebounds	24
43	Total rebounds	36
22	Assists	23
13	Turnovers	9
6	Steals	8
3	Blocks	1
18	Fouls	20

Starters:			Pts	Reb	Ast
PG	8	Tomáš Satoranský	13	2	6
SG	17	Jaromír Bohačík	6	4	2
SF	7	Vojtěch Hruban	9	5	2
PF	31	Martin Kříž	2	4	1
C	12	Ondřej Balvín	12	10	2
Reserves:					
PF	1	Patrik Auda	16	2	0
PG	4	Tomáš Vyoral	0	0	1
SF	6	Pavel Pumprla	4	0	2
SF	11	Blake Schilb	DNP		
PG	13	Jakub Šiřina	2	0	3
C	15	Martin Peterka	14	3	3
SF	23	Lukáš Palyza	3	2	1
Head coach:
(Israel) Ronen Ginzburg

- TCL Player of the Game: Bogdan Bogdanović

== Awards ==
TCL Player of the Game

Round	Player	Eff.
PR1	Bogdan Bogdanović	26
PR2	Nemanja Bjelica	25
PR3	Bogdan Bogdanović (2)	29
SR1	Boban Marjanović	20
CSF	Bogdan Bogdanović (3)	28
FPM	Bogdan Bogdanović (4)	32

All-Tournament Team

- Bogdan Bogdanović

Tournament Top Scorer (By total points scored)

- Bogdan Bogdanović (183 points)

== Statistics ==
=== Player statistics ===
Legend
GP	Games played	GS	Games started	MPG	Minutes per game
FG%	Field-goal percentage	3FG%	3-point field-goal percentage	FT%	Free-throw percentage
RPG	Rebounds per game	APG	Assists per game	SPG	Steals per game
BPG	Blocks per game	PPG	Points per game	EF	PIR per game

*	Tournament highs

Player	GP	GS	MPG	FG%	3FG%	FT%	RPG	APG	SPG	BPG	EF	PPG
Stefan Birčević	6	5	8.7	45.5	38.5	50.0	2.8	0.5	0.5	0.2	5.8	4.8
Nemanja Bjelica	7	0	21.4	42.9	42.9	83.3	4.7	2.7	0.9	0.6	13.3	10.7
Bogdan Bogdanović	8	8	28.0	55.6	53.0	80.0	4.1	4.4	1.3	0.3	24.6	22.9
Marko Gudurić	7	0	15.0	41.4	35.0	80.0	1.1	1.1	0.7	0.1	5.0	5.6
Nikola Jokić	8	3	22.6	68.0	40.0	80.0	7.5	4.8	0.3	0.5	19.0	11.5
Stefan Jović	8	7	25.0	49.0	31.8	50.0	3.9	5.4	1.0	0.3	12.3	7.0
Vladimir Lučić	8	7	21.7	47.1	28.6	87.5	3.0	0.9	0.8	0.3	9.1	7.1
Boban Marjanović	8	2	9.8	75.9	0.0	66.7	2.5	0.6	0.1	0.4	7.6	6.8
Vasilije Micić	8	1	18.7	43.2	20.0	100.0	1.8	3.3	0.9	0.0	7.1	5.6
Nikola Milutinov	8	4	14.3	77.8	0.0	70.0	2.3	0.8	0.1	0.1	8.5	7.0
Miroslav Raduljica	7	1	9.5	45.8	0.0	91.3	2.1	1.6	0.7	0.3	7.3	6.1
Marko Simonović	7	1	13.2	47.6	36.4	0.0	1.6	0.3	0.4	0.1	3.5	3.0
Total	8	8	200.0	53.5*	40.5	80.0	39.0	25.4*	7.1	2.9	118.5*	94.1

Last updated: September 14, 2019.
Source: FIBA Basketball World Cup

=== Statistical leaders ===
Last updated: September 14, 2019

==== Individual game highs ====
*	Tournament highs

Statistic	Name	Total	Opponent
Points	Bogdan Bogdanović; Bogdan Bogdanović	31	Italy; Czech Republic
Total Rebounds	Nikola Jokić	14	Czech Republic
Assists	Stefan Jović; Nemanja Bjelica; Stefan Jović	9	Angola; Italy; Puerto Rico
Blocks	Boban Marjanović; Nikola Jokić; Nemanja Bjelica; Vladimir Lučić	2	Philippines; Puerto Rico; Argentina; Argentina
Steals	Bogdan Bogdanović	5	Italy
Efficiency	Bogdan Bogdanović	36	Spain
Field goal percentage^{1}	Nemanja Bjelica	100% (7/7)	Philippines
2-point field goal percentage^{1}	Nikola Milutinov	100% (6/6)	Czech Republic
3-point field goal percentage	Nikola Jokić; Nemanja Bjelica; Vladimir Lučić	100% (3/3)	Angola; Philippines; United States
Free throw percentage	Bogdan Bogdanović	100% (6/6)	Spain
Turnovers	Boban Marjanović; Nikola Jokić	5	Angola; Argentina
Minutes	Bogdan Bogdanović	35:41	Italy

- ^{1}– at least 5 attempts

Statistic	Name	Total	Opponent
Field goals made	Bogdan Bogdanović; Bogdan Bogdanović; Bogdan Bogdanović	10	Italy; United States; Czech Republic
Field goals attempted	Bogdan Bogdanović	21	Italy
2-point field goals made	Boban Marjanović; Bogdan Bogdanović	7	Puerto Rico; Spain
2-point field goals attempted	Bogdan Bogdanović; Bogdan Bogdanović	10	Italy; Argentina
3-point field goals made	Bogdan Bogdanović; Bogdan Bogdanović	7	United States; Czech Republic
3-point field goals attempted	Bogdan Bogdanović	14	United States
Free throws made	Miroslav Raduljica	12	Italy
Free throws attempted	Miroslav Raduljica	13	Italy
Offensive Rebounds	Boban Marjanović; Bogdan Bogdanović; Nemanja Bjelica; Nikola Jokić; Boban Marjanović; Bogdan Bogdanović; Nikola Jokić; Vladimir Lučić; Nikola Jokić	3	Angola; Italy; Italy; Puerto Rico; Puerto Rico; Spain; Argentina; Argentina; Czech Republic
Defensive Rebounds	Nikola Jokić	11	Czech Republic
+/-	Nikola Jokić	40	Philippines

==== Team game highs ====
Statistic	Total	Opponent
Points	126*	Philippines
Total Rebounds	48	Puerto Rico
Assists	37*	Philippines
Blocks	6	Argentina
Steals	9	Philippines; Italy; Puerto Rico
Efficiency	179*	Philippines
Field goal percentage	75% (48/64)*	Philippines
2-point field goal percentage	86% (36/42)*	Philippines
3-point field goal percentage	65% (13/20)*	Angola
Free throw percentage	89% (24/27)	Spain
Turnovers	17	Puerto Rico; Spain

Statistic	Total	Opponent
Field goals made	48*	Philippines
Field goals attempted	67	Argentina
2-point field goals made	36*	Philippines
2-point field goals attempted	42	Philippines
3-point field goals made	15	United States
3-point field goals attempted	31	United States
Free throws made	28	Italy
Free throws attempted	34	Italy
Offensive Rebounds	18	Argentina
Defensive Rebounds	37	Puerto Rico
+/-	59*	Philippines

== Aftermath ==
The Serbia roster ended their 2019 FIBA Basketball World Cup campaign with a 6–2 record, finishing fifth. Serbia didn't manage to clinch the outright European berth for the 2020 Summer Olympics by failing to finish among two highest performing teams from FIBA Europe; Spain and France qualified instead. The only route for Serbia to qualify for the Summer Olympics is to won one of the Olympic qualifying tournaments.

At the end of the tournament, head coach Đorđević announced his decision to leave the position after six years. On 20 November, the Basketball Federation of Serbia named Igor Kokoškov the new head coach of the Serbia team.

== See also ==
- 2019 Philippines FIBA Basketball World Cup team
- 2019 Italy FIBA Basketball World Cup team
- 2019 United States FIBA Basketball World Cup team
