= 2019 AusTiger international basketball tournament =

International basketball tournament

Tournament details
- Arena: Liaoning Gymnasium; Shenyang, China; Anshan Olympic Sports Center; Anshan, China
- Dates: August 23–27

Final positions
- Champions: Serbia (1st title)
- Runners-up: France
- Third place: New Zealand
- Fourth place: Italy

Awards and statistics
- Top scorer(s): (Italy) Marco Belinelli (19.0 points per game)

The 2019 AusTiger international basketball tournament, also known as the 2019 Austiger Cup, is a men's international basketball competition between national teams, scheduled to be held from 23 to 27 August 2019 in Shenyang, China. The tournament is organized prior to the 2019 FIBA Basketball World Cup hosted by China. The competition is played under FIBA rules as a round-robin tournament. National teams of France, Italy, New Zealand, and Serbia will play at the tournament.

== Participating teams ==
- France
- Italy
- New Zealand
- Serbia

== Venues ==
Shenyang	2019 AusTiger international basketball tournament (Liaoning)
Liaoning Gymnasium	2019 AusTiger international basketball tournament (Liaoning)
Capacity: 12,000	2019 AusTiger international basketball tournament (Liaoning)
Anshan	2019 AusTiger international basketball tournament (Liaoning)
Anshan Olympic Sports; Center Gymnasium	2019 AusTiger international basketball tournament (Liaoning)
Capacity: N/A	2019 AusTiger international basketball tournament (Liaoning)

== Tournament ==
=== Standings ===
Pos	Team	Pld	W	L	PF	PA	PD	Pts
1	Serbia	3	3	0	220	199	+21	6
2	France	3	2	1	233	222	+11	5
3	New Zealand	3	1	2	247	265	−18	4
4	Italy	3	0	3	227	241	−14	3

Updated to match(es) played on 27 August 2019. Source: Flashscore

=== Matches ===
All times are local UTC+8.

23 August 2019
19:30

Report 1 Report 2

Serbia	71–65	Italy
Scoring by quarter: 27–17, 20–17, 12–14, 12–17
Pts: Bogdanović 15; Rebs: Milutinov 7 Asts: Micić 3		Pts: Belinelli 18; Rebs: Abass, Gallinari 6 Asts: Hackett 3

Liaoning Gymnasium, Shenyang
Attendance: 2,000
Referees: not available

24 August 2019
19:30

Boxscore

France	95–81	New Zealand
Scoring by quarter: 19–19, 23–24, 32–13, 21–25
Pts: de Colo 19; Rebs: four players 5 Asts: de Colo, Batum 4		Pts: C. Webster, Smith-Milner 11; Rebs: Pledger 7 Asts: C. Webster 3

Liaoning Gymnasium, Shenyang
Attendance: not available
Referees: not available

25 August 2019
15:30

Boxscore

Italy	80–82	France
Scoring by quarter: 18–20, 20–19, 19–26, 23–17
Pts: Belinelli 20; Rebs: Tessitori 7 Asts: Datome, Hackett 3		Pts: Fournier 29; Rebs: Batum 5 Asts: Okobo 4

Liaoning Gymnasium, Shenyang
Attendance: 1,500
Referees: Saša Maričić (SRB), Xin Geng Wei (CHN), Martin Davison (NZL)

25 August 2019
19:30

Report

New Zealand	78–88	Serbia
Scoring by quarter: 16–25, 26–28, 8–15, 28–20
Pts: T. Webster 16; Rebs: T. Webster, Loe 5 Asts: C. Webster 4		Pts: Milutinov 19; Rebs: Jokić 11; Asts: Micić 9

Anshan Olympic Sports Center Gymnasium, Anshan
Attendance: not available
Referees: not available

26 August 2019
19:30

Report

Italy	82–88	New Zealand
Scoring by quarter: 14–26, 23–20, 24–18, 21–24
Pts: Gallinari 22; Rebs: Brooks 8 Asts: Vitali, Gallinari 2		Pts: C. Webster 21; Rebs: Loe, Fotu 6 Asts: C. Webster, T. Webster 6

Anshan Olympic Sports Center Gymnasium, Anshan
Attendance: 2,000
Referees: Saša Maričić (SRB), Xing Jin Ming (CHN), Nicolas Maestre (FRA)

27 August 2019
19:30

Boxscore Report

Serbia	61–56	France
Scoring by quarter: 14–17, 9–15, 23–16, 15–8
Pts: Raduljica 13; Rebs: Jokić 8 Asts: Jović 3		Pts: Batum 9 Rebs: Lacombe 7 Asts: four players 2

Liaoning Gymnasium, Shenyang
Attendance: not available
Referees: Xing Jin Ming (CHN), Martin Davison (NZL), Beniamino Attard (ITA)

== Final standing ==
Rank	Team
1st place, gold medalist(s)	Serbia
2nd place, silver medalist(s)	France
3rd place, bronze medalist(s)	New Zealand
4	Italy

2019 Austiger Cup winners

Serbia
First title

== Statistics ==
Top Scorers PPG

Pos.	Name	G	Pts	PPG
1	(Italy) Marco Belinelli	3	57	19.0
2	(France) Evan Fournier	2	36	18.0
3	(Italy) Danilo Gallinari	3	48	16.0
4	(Italy) Alessandro Gentile	2	31	15.5
4	(France) Nando de Colo	2	31	15.5
6	(New Zealand) Corey Webster	3	41	13.7
7	(Serbia) Nikola Milutinov	3	35	11.7
8	(Serbia) Stefan Jović	3	32	10.7
9	(Serbia) Boban Marjanović	2	19	9.5
9	(Italy) Daniel Hackett	2	19	9.5

Rebounds

Pos.	Name	G	Rbs	RPG
1	(Serbia) Nikola Jokić	3	23	7.7
2	(Serbia) Marko Simonović	3	16	5.3
3	(Serbia) Nikola Milutinov	3	15	5.0
4	(France) Nicolas Batum	3	14	4.7
5	(New Zealand) Isaac Fotu	3	13	4.3

Assists

Pos.	Name	G	Ast	APG
1	(Serbia) Vasilije Micić	3	14	4.7
2	(New Zealand) Corey Webster	3	13	4.3
3	(New Zealand) Tai Webster	3	11	3.7
4	(Serbia) Stefan Jović	3	7	2.3
4	(France) Nicolas Batum	3	7	2.3

== See also ==
- 2019 Italy FIBA Basketball World Cup team
- 2019 Serbia FIBA Basketball World Cup team
- Acropolis Tournament
- Basketball at the Summer Olympics
- FIBA Basketball World Cup
- FIBA Asia Cup
- FIBA Diamond Ball
- Adecco Cup
- Marchand Continental Championship Cup
- Belgrade Trophy
- Stanković Cup
- William Jones Cup
