= 2017 Serbia EuroBasket team =

The 2017 Serbia EuroBasket team represented Serbia and won the silver medal at the EuroBasket 2017 in Helsinki (Finland), Tel Aviv (Israel), Cluj-Napoca (Romania) and Istanbul (Turkey). They were automatically qualified for the EuroBasket by taking the 4th place in EuroBasket 2015. The team was coached by Aleksandar Đorđević, with assistant coaches Miroslav Nikolić, Milan Minić and Jovica Antonić.

The EuroBasket 2017 was the 40th edition of the EuroBasket championship that is organized by FIBA Europe.

== Timeline ==
- June 19: 25-man roster announced
- July 3: 17-man roster announcement
- July 20: Gathering of the players in Belgrade
- July 23: Start of a training camp on Kopaonik mountain
- August 6: The end of the training camp
- August 11–25: Exhibition games
- August 31 – September 17: EuroBasket 2017

== Roster ==
=== 25 players called up ===
Other than guard Stefan Marković—who had announced his retirement from international basketball after the 2016 Olympics at the age of 28—each player from the 2016 Rio de Janeiro Olympics silver-winning team was also included on the 25-man preliminary roster for EuroBasket 2017. The upcoming EuroBasket would thus mark the first time that the Serbian national team is without Stefan Marković at a major tournament since Serbia went independent in 2006.

Minnesota Timberwolves power forward Nemanja Bjelica was included on the 25-man roster, despite a left foot injury he had sustained in March 2017, which made him unavailable to join the team. Denver Nuggets center Nikola Jokić announced on July 3 that he would not be showing up at the training camp, citing his desire to prepare for the following NBA season. In addition to Bjelica and Jokić who were unavailable due to injury or personal reasons, six more players were cut by head coach Đorđević: Nikola Milutinov, Nemanja Dangubić, Ognjen Jaramaz, Ognjen Dobrić, Aleksa Radanov, and Dejan Davidovac.

=== 17 players at the training camp ===
On July 29, with the 17-player training camp already under way for some ten days, the first one to drop out was Marko Simonović due to injuring his right thumb.

On August 17, head coach Aleksandar Đorđević announced that center Miroslav Raduljica would not be able to play at the championship, due to a knee injury.

Three days later, on August 20, head coach Đorđević announced that team captain Miloš Teodosić would also be unable to continue, due to a chronic thigh injury. Power forward Milan Mačvan was selected as a new team captain due to Teodosić's inability to play at the EuroBasket.

On August 29, it was announced that Nemanja Nedović and Nikola Kalinić wouldn't be able to participate at the championships, due to injuries.

==== Final 12-man roster ====
The members of Serbia roster at the 2016 Summer Olympics guards Bogdan Bogdanović, Stefan Jović, forwards Stefan Birčević, Milan Mačvan and center Vladimir Štimac are coming back to EuroBasket roster, while guards forwards Branko Lazić, Marko Gudurić and Vladimir Lučić make senior men's debut with the Serbian national team, at a major international tournament. (Note: Major international tournaments are EuroBasket, FIBA World Cup and Summer Olympics) Center Boban Marjanović makes the first appearance at a major tournament since the EuroBasket 2011 while guard Vasilije Micić previously played at the EuroBasket 2013. Guard Dragan Milosavljević and center Ognjen Kuzmić made their debuts at the EuroBasket 2015.

The following is the Serbia roster for the EuroBasket 2017

Serbia men's national basketball team – EuroBasket 2017 roster
Players
Coaches

| Pos. | No. | Name | Age – Date of birth | Height | Club | Ctr. |
|---|---|---|---|---|---|---|
| PF | 6 | Milan Mačvan (C) | 27 – November 16, 1989 | 2.06 m (6 ft 9 in) | Olimpia Milano | (Italy) |
| SG | 7 | Bogdan Bogdanović | 25 – August 18, 1992 | 1.98 m (6 ft 6 in) | Fenerbahçe | (Turkey) |
| F | 11 | Vladimir Lučić | 28 – June 17, 1989 | 2.04 m (6 ft 8 in) | Bayern Munich | (Germany) |
| SG | 12 | Dragan Milosavljević | 28 – May 11, 1989 | 1.98 m (6 ft 6 in) | Alba Berlin | (Germany) |
| PF | 14 | Stefan Birčević | 27 – December 13, 1989 | 2.10 m (6 ft 11 in) | Partizan | (Serbia) |
| C | 15 | Vladimir Štimac | 29 – September 25, 1987 | 2.11 m (6 ft 11 in) | Beşiktaş J.K. | (Turkey) |
| G/F | 19 | Branko Lazić | 28 – January 12, 1989 | 1.95 m (6 ft 5 in) | Crvena zvezda | (Serbia) |
| PG | 22 | Vasilije Micić | 23 – January 13, 1994 | 1.95 m (6 ft 5 in) | Tofaş | (Turkey) |
| G/F | 23 | Marko Gudurić | 22 – March 8, 1995 | 1.99 m (6 ft 6 in) | Crvena zvezda | (Serbia) |
| G | 24 | Stefan Jović | 26 – November 3, 1990 | 1.98 m (6 ft 6 in) | Crvena zvezda | (Serbia) |
| C | 32 | Ognjen Kuzmić | 27 – May 16, 1990 | 2.13 m (7 ft 0 in) | Crvena zvezda | (Serbia) |
| C | 51 | Boban Marjanović | 29 – August 15, 1988 | 2.21 m (7 ft 3 in) | Detroit Pistons | (United States) |

Head coach

- (Serbia) Aleksandar Đorđević

Assistant coach(es)

- (Serbia) Miroslav Nikolić
- (Serbia) Jovica Antonić
- (Serbia) Milan Minić

Legend

- (C) Team captain
- Club – describes last
  club before the tournament
- Age – describes age
  on 31 August 2017

The following were candidates to make the team:

Earlier candidates
| Player | Team (Note: Team at the time player was a candidate) | Added | Removed | Reason |
|---|---|---|---|---|
| Nikola Jokić | (United States) Denver Nuggets | June 19, 2017 | July 3, 2017 | Withdrew |
| Nemanja Bjelica | (United States) Minnesota Timberwolves | June 19, 2017 | July 3, 2017 | Injured |
| Nikola Milutinov | (Greece) Olympiacos | June 19, 2017 | July 3, 2017 | 17-man roster cut |
| Nemanja Dangubić | (Serbia) Crvena zvezda | June 19, 2017 | July 3, 2017 | 17-man roster cut |
| Ognjen Jaramaz | (Serbia) Mega Bemax | June 19, 2017 | July 3, 2017 | 17-man roster cut |
| Ognjen Dobrić | (Serbia) Crvena zvezda | June 19, 2017 | July 3, 2017 | 17-man roster cut |
| Aleksa Radanov | (Serbia) FMP | June 19, 2017 | July 3, 2017 | 17-man roster cut |
| Dejan Davidovac | (Serbia) FMP | June 19, 2017 | July 3, 2017 | 17-man roster cut |
| Marko Simonović | (Serbia) Crvena zvezda | June 19, 2017 | July 29, 2017 | Injured |
| Miroslav Raduljica | (Italy) Olimpia Milano | June 19, 2017 | August 17, 2017 | Injured |
| Miloš Teodosić | (Russia) CSKA Moscow | June 19, 2017 | August 20, 2017 | Injured |
| Nemanja Nedović | (Spain) Unicaja | June 19, 2017 | August 29, 2017 | 12-man roster cut |
| Nikola Kalinić | (Turkey) Fenerbahçe | June 19, 2017 | August 29, 2017 | 12-man roster cut |

=== Depth chart ===
| Pos. | Starting 5 | Bench 1 | Bench 2 |
|---|---|---|---|
| C | Ognjen Kuzmić | Boban Marjanović | Vladimir Štimac |
| PF | Milan Mačvan | Stefan Birčević |
| SF | Vladimir Lučić | Marko Gudurić |
| SG | Bogdan Bogdanović | Dragan Milosavljević | Branko Lazić |
| PG | Stefan Jović | Vasilije Micić |

== Staff ==
| Position | Staff member | Age | Team |
|---|---|---|---|
| Head coach | (Serbia) Aleksandar Đorđević | 49 | (Germany) Bayern Munich |
| Assistant coaches | (Serbia) Miroslav Nikolić | 61 | (Serbia) Partizan |
| Assistant coaches | (Serbia) Jovica Antonić | 51 | —N/a |
| Assistant coaches | (Serbia) Milan Minić | 62 | —N/a |
| Team manager | (Serbia) Nebojša Ilić | 49 | (Serbia) Crvena zvezda |
| Conditioning coaches | (Serbia) Mladen Mihajlović | 32 | (Germany) Bayern Munich |
| Conditioning coaches | (Serbia) Ivan Zarić | 32 | —N/a |
| Scouts | (Serbia) Dragan Popov | | —N/a |
| Scouts | (Serbia) Goran Topić | 50 | (Serbia) Vršac |
| Physician | (Serbia) Dragan Radovanović | | —N/a |
| Physiotherapists | (Serbia) Dušan Sajić | | —N/a |
| Physiotherapists | (Serbia) Velibor Kosanović | | (Serbia) Vršac |
| Equipment Manager | (Serbia) Jovica Aničić | | —N/a |
| Press Officer | (Serbia) Vladimir Sibinović | | —N/a |

Source: KSS

== Exhibition games ==
The Serbia roster has begun its exhibition schedule against Serbian University team on August 2, 2017. They had participated at the 2017 Belgrade Trophy (August 11–13) together with Greece and Montenegro, then at the Supercup in Hamburg, Germany (August 17–20) with Germany, Poland and Russia. Last games were at the 2017 Acropolis of Athens Tournament where they played together with Greece, Italy and Georgia from August 23–25.

Serbia played nine exhibition games. Had just one lost. The Serbia roster won the Belgrade Trophy and the Hamburg Supercup and came the second at the Acropolis of Athens.

Kraljevo game

August 2, 2017
19:00 (CET)

Report

| Serbia | 77–54 | (Serbia) Serbian University team |
Scoring by quarter: 14–14, 20–16, 22–12, 21–12
| Pts: Jović 11; Rebs: not available Asts: not available | | Pts: Tejić 13; Rebs: not available Asts: not available |

Sports Hall, Kraljevo
Attendance: 3,500
Referees: Maričić, Stefanović, Dimovski

Belgrade Trophy

August 12, 2017
21:00 (CET)

Report

| Greece | 61–93 | Serbia |
Scoring by quarter: 15–23, 7–22, 14–21, 25–27
| Pts: Bourousis 13; Rebs: Bourousis, Printezis; Asts: Mantzaris 3 | | Pts: Bogdanović 14; Rebs: Mačvan 5 Asts: Bogdanović 9 |

Aleksandar Nikolić Hall, Belgrade
Attendance: 5,600
Referees: Juras, Obrknežević, Prpa

August 13, 2017
21:00 (CET)

Report

| Serbia | 82–71 | Montenegro |
Scoring by quarter: 19–24, 27–13, 18–18, 18–16
| Pts: Bogdanović 25; Rebs: Kuzmić 7 Asts: Bogdanović, Micić 5 | | Pts: Dubljević 13; Rebs: Vučević 10; Asts: Rice 5 |

Aleksandar Nikolić Hall, Belgrade
Attendance: 6,000
Referees: Obrknežević, Jevtović, Ninković

Supercup Hamburg

August 18, 2017
21:00 (CET)

Boxscore

| Poland | 78–85 | Serbia |
Scoring by quarter: 19–25, 18–18, 21–21, 20–21
| Pts: Ponitka 22; Rebs: Gielo 6 Asts: Koszarek 4 | | Pts: Lučić 22; Rebs: Kuzmić 7 Asts: Bogdanović, Jović 5 |

Edel-optics.de Arena, Hamburg
Attendance: 2,085
Referees: Madinger, Makhlin, Straube

August 19, 2017
20:00 (CET)

Boxscore

| Serbia | 85–75 | Russia |
Scoring by quarter: 20–16, 16–18, 23–18, 26–23
| Pts: Mačvan 17; Rebs: Marjanović 8 Asts: Bogdanović 9 | | Pts: Shved 17; Rebs: Vorontsevich 6 Asts: Shved 5 |

Edel-optics.de Arena, Hamburg
Attendance: 3,185
Referees: Madinger, Maliszewski, Straube

August 20, 2017
15:00 (CET)

Boxscore

| Germany | 56–87 | Serbia |
Scoring by quarter: 17–27, 17–17, 6–19, 16–24
| Pts: Schröder 16; Rebs: Barthel, Hartenstein 5 Asts: Schröder 6 | | Pts: Birčević 21; Rebs: Štimac 6 Asts: Bogdanović, Milosavljević 5 |

Edel-optics.de Arena, Hamburg
Attendance: 3,305
Referees: Makhlin, Vovk, Maliszewski

Acropolis of Athens

August 23, 2017
18:45 (EET)

Report

| Serbia | 73–65 | Italy |
Scoring by quarter: 22–24, 18–14, 19–18, 14–9
| Pts: Marjanović 21; Rebs: Marjanović 8 Asts: Mačvan 7 | | Pts: Belinelli 20; Rebs: Melli 5 Asts: Belinelli 4 |

O.A.C.A. Olympic Hall, Athens
Attendance: not available
Referees: Anastopoulos, Karakatsounis, Poursanidis

August 24, 2017
18:45 (EET)

Report

| Serbia | 66–68 | Georgia |
Scoring by quarter: 20–15, 16–21, 19–14, 11–18
| Pts: Marjanović 19; Rebs: Kuzmić 9 Asts: Micić 4 | | Pts: Shengelia 21; Rebs: Shengelia 14; Asts: Tsintsadze 5 |

O.A.C.A. Olympic Hall, Athens
Attendance: not available
Referees: Poursanidis, Tsaroucha, Symeonidis

August 25, 2017
21:00 (EET)

Report

| Greece | 67–69 | Serbia |
Scoring by quarter: 18–21, 17–17, 9–16, 23–15
| Pts: Sloukas 15; Rebs: Papagiannis 6 Asts: Sloukas 6 | | Pts: Milosavljević 17; Rebs: Birčević 7 Asts: Bogdanović 8 |

O.A.C.A. Olympic Hall, Athens
Attendance: not available
Referees: Piloidis, Karakatsounis, Somos

== Tournament ==
=== Preliminary round ===
| Pos | Team | Pld | W | L | PF | PA | PD | Pts | Qualification |
|---|---|---|---|---|---|---|---|---|---|
| 1 | Serbia | 5 | 4 | 1 | 400 | 353 | +47 | 9 (Note: Serbia 3 Pts, +7 PD; Latvia 3 Pts, +5 PD; Russia 3 Pts, −12 PD) | Knockout stage |
| 2 | Latvia | 5 | 4 | 1 | 444 | 396 | +48 | 9 | Knockout stage |
| 3 | Russia | 5 | 4 | 1 | 378 | 366 | +12 | 9 | Knockout stage |
| 4 | Turkey (H) | 5 | 2 | 3 | 388 | 380 | +8 | 7 | Knockout stage |
| 5 | Belgium | 5 | 1 | 4 | 353 | 410 | −57 | 6 | |
| 6 | Great Britain | 5 | 0 | 5 | 390 | 448 | −58 | 5 | |

Source: EuroBasket
Rules for classification: 1) Points; 2) Head-to-head results; 3) Points difference; 4) Points scored.
(H) Hosts
Notes:

All times are local (UTC+3)

==== Latvia ====
1 September 2017
17:00

Boxscore

| Serbia | 92–82 | Latvia |
Scoring by quarter: 21–24, 24–23, 20–13, 27–22
| Pts: Bogdanović 30; Rebs: Mačvan 10; Asts: Jović 8 | | Pts: Dai. Bertāns 23; Rebs: Dāv. Bertāns, Timma 6 Asts: Dai. Bertāns 6 |

Ülker Sports Arena, Istanbul
Attendance: 1,500
Referees: Marek Cmikiewicz (POL), Tomas Jasevičius (LTU), Martin Horozov (BUL)

==== Russia ====
2 September 2017
17:00

Boxscore

| Russia | 75–72 | Serbia |
Scoring by quarter: 18–21, 22–17, 18–13, 17–21
| Pts: Shved 22; Rebs: Mozgov 8 Asts: Khvostov, Vorontsevich 5 | | Pts: Bogdanović, Marjanović 19; Rebs: Kuzmić, Marjanović 6 Asts: Jović 7 |

Ülker Sports Arena, Istanbul
Attendance: 1,603
Referees: Saverio Lanzarini (ITA), Manuel Mazzoni (ITA), Georgios Poursanidis (GRE)

==== Turkey ====
4 September 2017
21:00

Boxscore

| Serbia | 80–74 | Turkey |
Scoring by quarter: 21–13, 15–18, 17–14, 27–29
| Pts: Bogdanović 17; Rebs: Lučić 9 Asts: Jović 9 | | Pts: Mahmutoğlu 19; Rebs: Erden 5 Asts: Osman 5 |

Ülker Sports Arena, Istanbul
Attendance: 9,692
Referees: Marek Cmikiewicz (POL), Tomas Jasevičius (LTU), Manuel Mazzoni (ITA)

==== Great Britain ====
5 September 2017
17:00

Boxscore

| Great Britain | 68–82 | Serbia |
Scoring by quarter: 14–25, 24–22, 17–18, 13–17
| Pts: Okereafor 17; Rebs: Olaseni 13; Asts: Okereafor 4 | | Pts: Bogdanović 18; Rebs: Bogdanović 7 Asts: Bogdanović 7 |

Ülker Sports Arena, Istanbul
Attendance: 1,080
Referees: Georgios Poursanidis (GRE), Michael Weiland (CAN), Martin Horozov (BUL)

==== Belgium ====
7 September 2017
17:15

Boxscore

| Belgium | 54–74 | Serbia |
Scoring by quarter: 13–18, 12–24, 11–14, 18–18
| Pts: Lecomte 12; Rebs: Van Rossom, Tumba 5 Asts: Tabu 4 | | Pts: Marjanović 22; Rebs: Micić 9 Asts: Bogdanović 9 |

Ülker Sports Arena, Istanbul
Attendance: 761
Referees: Manuel Mazzoni (ITA), Marek Cmikiewicz (POL), Martin Horozov (BUL)

=== Knockout stage ===
==== Round of 16 ====
Serbia made the early running before Hungary fought back nearing half-time and the second-half was a near mirror image. Hungary got within 7 points early in the fourth but Serbia steadied, with their dominance on the inside too much for Hungary to handle. Hungary made a comeback bid in the last quarter getting the margin to within 7 points with 8 minutes left after hitting consecutive threes. However, a pretty penetration and dish by Stefan Jović to Milan Mačvan steadied things for Serbia before Boban Marjanović scored four quick points to snuff out Hungary's challenge. Ognjen Kuzmić was a handful for Hungary all game and finished with 17 points and 10 rebounds in a commanding performance. Serbia's size was too much for Hungary and that showed on the glass with their 37-23 domination in rebounds.

10 September 2017
15:15

Boxscore

| Serbia | 86–78 | Hungary |
Scoring by quarter: 24–16, 24–25, 21–12, 17–25
| Pts: Bogdanović, Kuzmić 17; Rebs: Kuzmić 10; Asts: Jović 7 | | Pts: Perl 22; Rebs: Perl 7 Asts: Hanga, Perl 4 |

Sinan Erdem Dome, Istanbul
Attendance: 1,190
Referees: Leandro Lezcano (ARG), Georgios Poursanidis (GRE), Yener Yılmaz (TUR)

==== Quarterfinals ====
Serbia outscored Italy 26-16 in a dominant second quarter to take command of the contest. Italy appeared set to stage a comeback midway through the fourth, getting within 8 points, but Bogdan Bogdanović hit a three and scored another bucket on the next possession to steady Serbia. Serbia took full advantage of their size advantage by dominating on the boards to convincingly win the rebounds 44-19. Bogdanović struggled in the opening three quarters scoring just 8 points, including 0-of-7 from three. However, he came alive in the fourth to ensure Serbia would not have any nervous moments.

13 September 2017
21:30

Boxscore

| Italy | 67–83 | Serbia |
Scoring by quarter: 17–18, 16–26, 15–15, 19–24
| Pts: Belinelli 18; Rebs: Biligha, Filloy 3 Asts: Melli 3 | | Pts: Bogdanović 22; Rebs: Kuzmić, Marjanović 7 Asts: Jović 5 |

Sinan Erdem Dome, Istanbul
Attendance: 3,046
Referees: Vicente Bulto (ESP), Takaki Kato (JPN), Tomas Jasevičius (LTU)

==== Semifinals ====
It was a game of spurts with momentum swinging wildly within minutes. Russia trailed for much of the game by double digits before getting within 2 points midway through the fourth. Aleksey Shved missed a wide open deep three for the lead, only for Vasilije Micić to connect from deep at the other end. It gave the momentum to Serbia and they hung on from there. With the towering Boban Marjanović, Serbia absolutely dominated in the paint, despite Russia having no shortage of size themselves. Serbia won the battle down-low, outscoring Russia 44-22 in the paint. Serbia led for most of the game through a 14-0 run in the second quarter. However, the game took several turns as Russia would not give up. With Shved scoring in spurts, Russia fought right back getting it to a single possession game until Serbia steadied late.

15 September 2017
21:30

Boxscore

| Russia | 79–87 | Serbia |
Scoring by quarter: 20–25, 14–23, 23–18, 22–21
| Pts: Shved 33; Rebs: Mozgov 9 Asts: Shved 5 | | Pts: Bogdanović 24; Rebs: Lučić 8 Asts: Jović 6 |

Sinan Erdem Dome, Istanbul
Attendance: 5,235
Referees: Leandro Lezcano (ARG), Panagiotis Anastopoulos (GRE), Manuel Mazzoni (ITA)

=== Final ===
17 September 2017
21:30

Boxscore

| Slovenia | 93–85 | Serbia |
Scoring by quarter: 20–22, 36–25, 15–20, 22–18
| Pts: Dragić 35; Rebs: Dragić, Dončić 7 Asts: Dragić, Prepelič 3 | | Pts: Bogdanović 22; Rebs: Lučić 8 Asts: Bogdanović 5 |

Sinan Erdem Dome, Istanbul
Attendance: 12,095
Referees: Cristiano Maranho (BRA), Tolga Sahin (ITA), Antonio Conde (ESP)

=== Awards ===
All-Tournament Team

- Bogdan Bogdanović

=== Statistics ===
Legend
| GP | Games played | GS | Games started | MPG | Minutes per game |
| FG% | Field-goal percentage | 3FG% | 3-point field-goal percentage | FT% | Free-throw percentage |
| RPG | Rebounds per game | APG | Assists per game | SPG | Steals per game |
| BPG | Blocks per game | PPG | Points per game | EF | PIR per game |

| Player | GP | GS | MPG | FG% | 3FG% | FT% | RPG | APG | SPG | BPG | EF | PPG |
|---|---|---|---|---|---|---|---|---|---|---|---|---|
| Stefan Birčević | 9 | 7 | 10.6 | .375 | .429 | 1.00 | 2.2 | .4 | .3 | .1 | 3.4 | 2.4 |
| Bogdan Bogdanović | 9 | 9 | 31.8 | .474 | .292 | .825 | 3.6 | 5.0 | 1.2 | .1 | 19.9 | 20.4 |
| Marko Gudurić | 8 | 0 | 10.6 | .611 | .364 | .750 | .6 | .8 | .5 | .1 | 3.8 | 3.6 |
| Stefan Jović | 9 | 9 | 22.2 | .545 | .333 | .500 | 2.4 | 5.4 | 1.8 | .3 | 12.2 | 6.4 |
| Ognjen Kuzmić | 9 | 9 | 17.6 | .489 | .000 | .692 | 5.1 | 1.3 | .1 | .8 | 9.7 | 7.1 |
| Branko Lazić | 6 | 0 | 6.0 | .333 | .000 | 1.00 | .5 | .5 | .1 | .0 | 1.3 | .7 |
| Vladimir Lučić | 9 | 9 | 27.0 | .500 | .476 | .636 | 5.6 | 1.1 | 1.1 | .1 | 12.7 | 8.9 |
| Boban Marjanović | 9 | 0 | 16.2 | .562 | .000 | .870 | 4.8 | 1.4 | .2 | .3 | 13.4 | 12.4 |
| Milan Mačvan | 9 | 2 | 26.1 | .500 | .292 | .957 | 4.0 | 2.7 | .3 | .1 | 12.7 | 10.8 |
| Vasilije Micić | 9 | 0 | 12.9 | .333 | .300 | .750 | 1.7 | 1.3 | .3 | .0 | 3.6 | 2.4 |
| Dragan Milosavljević | 9 | 0 | 16.6 | .433 | .286 | .727 | 2.2 | .8 | .3 | .1 | 5.0 | 4.9 |
| Vladimir Štimac | 8 | 0 | 6.4 | .435 | .000 | .500 | 2.3 | .3 | .1 | .0 | 3.3 | 3.1 |
| Total | 9 | 9 | 200.0 | .487 | .329 | .771 | 38.6 | 20.8 | 6.4 | 2.2 | 99.7 | 82.3 |

Source: EuroBasket 2017

=== Statistical leaders ===
==== Individual game highs ====
| Statistic | Name | Total | Opponent |
|---|---|---|---|
| Points | Bogdan Bogdanović | 30 | Latvia |
| Total Rebounds | Milan Mačvan; Ognjen Kuzmić | 10 | Latvia; Hungary |
| Assists | Stefan Jović; Bogdan Bogdanović | 9 | Turkey; Belgium |
| Blocks | Ognjen Kuzmić | 2 | Italy |
| Steals | Bogdan Bogdanović | 5 | Great Britain |
| Efficiency | Bogdan Bogdanović | 28 | Latvia |
| Field goal percentage | Bogdan Bogdanović | 83% (5/6) | Hungary |
| 2-point field goal percentage | Stefan Jović | 100% (4/4) | Hungary |
| 3-point field goal percentage | Bogdan Bogdanović | 100% (3/3) | Hungary |
| Free throw percentage | Boban Marjanović; Dragan Milosavljević | 100% (6/6) | Latvia; Italy |
| Turnovers | Bogdan Bogdanović; Boban Marjanović | 4 | Hungary; Hungary |
| Minutes | Vladimir Lučić | 35:02 | Turkey |

| Statistic | Name | Total | Opponent |
|---|---|---|---|
| Field goals made | Bogdan Bogdanović; Bogdan Bogdanović; Bogdan Bogdanović | 9 | Latvia; Russia (SF); Slovenia |
| Field goals attempted | Bogdan Bogdanović | 21 | Slovenia |
| 2-point field goals made | Boban Marjanović | 8 | Belgium |
| 2-point field goals attempted | Boban Marjanović | 12 | Belgium |
| 3-point field goals made | Bogdan Bogdanović; Bogdan Bogdanović; Bogdan Bogdanović; Stefan Jović; Bogdan Bogdanović; Bogdan Bogdanović | 3 | Latvia; Russia; Turkey; Great Britain; Hungary; Russia (SF) |
| 3-point field goals attempted | Bogdan Bogdanović | 11 | Slovenia |
| Free throws made | Boban Marjanović | 11 | Russia |
| Free throws attempted | Boban Marjanović | 13 | Russia |
| Offensive Rebounds | Ognjen Kuzmić | 6 | Turkey |
| Defensive Rebounds | Vasilije Micić | 8 | Belgium |
| +/- | Bogdan Bogdanović | 26 | Belgium |

==== Team game highs ====
| Statistic | Total | Opponent |
|---|---|---|
| Points | 92 | Latvia |
| Total Rebounds | 46 | Latvia |
| Assists | 27 | Great Britain |
| Blocks | 4 | Latvia; Italy |
| Steals | 11 | Great Britain |
| Efficiency | 114 | Italy |
| Field goal percentage | 63% (32/51) | Hungary |
| 2-point field goal percentage | 70% (26/37) | Russia (SF) |
| 3-point field goal percentage | 46% (6/13) | Hungary |
| Free throw percentage | 90% (26/29) | Italy |
| Turnovers | 16 | Russia |

| Statistic | Total | Opponent |
|---|---|---|
| Field goals made | 33 | Russia (SF) |
| Field goals attempted | 72 | Latvia |
| 2-point field goals made | 26 | Belgium; Hungary; Russia (SF) |
| 2-point field goals attempted | 53 | Latvia |
| 3-point field goals made | 10 | Great Britain |
| 3-point field goals attempted | 28 | Great Britain |
| Free throws made | 30 | Latvia |
| Free throws attempted | 40 | Latvia |
| Offensive Rebounds | 19 | Latvia |
| Defensive Rebounds | 30 | Belgium |
| +/- | 20 | Belgium |
