= 2015–16 ABA League =

ABA League
- Season: 2015–16
- Duration: October 1, 2015 – March 7, 2016 (Regular season); March 14, – May 2, 2016 (Playoffs)
- Teams: 14
- TV partner: Arena Sport

Regular season
- Top seed: (Montenegro) Budućnost
- Season MVP: (Croatia) Miro Bilan (Cedevita)
- Relegated: (Montenegro) Sutjeska (Slovenia) Tajfun

Finals
- Champions: (Serbia) Crvena Zvezda Telekom; 2nd title
- Runners-up: (Serbia) Mega Leks
- Semi-finalists: (Montenegro) Budućnost (Croatia) Cedevita
- Finals MVP: (Serbia) Stefan Jović (Crvena Zvezda Telekom)

Awards
- Best young player: (Croatia) Ante Žižić (Cibona)

Statistical leaders
| Points | (Serbia) Tadija Dragićević (Budućnost) | 16.33 |
| Rebounds | (Croatia) Ante Žižić (Cibona) | 8.00 |
| Assists | (Montenegro) Omar Cook (Budućnost) | 6.62 |

The 2015–16 ABA League was the 15th season of the ABA League, with 14 teams from Serbia, Croatia, Slovenia, Montenegro, Bosnia and Herzegovina and Macedonia participating in it.

Regular season started on October 1, 2015, and finished on March 7, 2016 followed by playoffs of the four best placed teams.

== Teams ==
Location of teams in the 2015–16 ABA League

| Country | Teams | Qualification | Team | City | Venue (Capacity) |
|---|---|---|---|---|---|
| Serbia | 4 | | | | |
| Serbia | 4 | 1st in the Basketball League of Serbia | Crvena Zvezda | Belgrade | Hall Aleksandar Nikolić (8,150) |
| Serbia | 4 | 2nd in the Basketball League of Serbia | Partizan | Belgrade | Hall Aleksandar Nikolić (8,150) |
| Serbia | 4 | 3rd in the Basketball League of Serbia | Metalac | Valjevo | Valjevo Sports Hall (2,500) |
| Serbia | 4 | 4th in the Basketball League of Serbia | Mega Leks | Sremska Mitrovica | Sports Hall Pinki (3,000) |
| Croatia | 3 | | | | |
| Croatia | 3 | 1st place in the A-1 League | Cedevita | Zagreb | Dom Sportova (3,500) |
| Croatia | 3 | 2nd place in the A-1 League | Cibona | Zagreb | Dražen Petrović Basketball Hall (5,400) |
| Croatia | 3 | 3rd place in the A-1 League | Zadar | Zadar | Krešimir Ćosić Hall (10,000) |
| Slovenia | 3 | | | | |
| Slovenia | 3 | Champion of the 1.A SKL | Tajfun | Šentjur | Golovec Hall (3,200) |
| Slovenia | 3 | 1st place in 1.A SKL | Krka | Novo mesto | Leon Štukelj Hall (3,000) |
| Slovenia | 3 | Wild card | Union Olimpija | Ljubljana | Arena Stožice (12,480) |
| Montenegro | 2 | | | | |
| Montenegro | 2 | Champion of Montenegrin Basketball League | Budućnost | Podgorica | Morača Sports Center (5,000) |
| Montenegro | 2 | 2nd place in Montenegrin Basketball League | Sutjeska (Note: A qualification tournament, to which the highest placed teams (that did not already qualify for the 2015/16 ABA League) from the Croatian, Macedonian, Bosnian and Montenegrin Leagues were invited, was announced. After Zagreb, Kumanovo and Široki withdrew from the tournament, Sutjeska was placed in the League.) | Nikšić | Nikšić Sports Center (3,000) |
| Bosnia and Herzegovina | 1 | Champion of Premijer liga BiH | Igokea | Aleksandrovac | Laktaši Sports Hall (3,050) |
| (North Macedonia) Macedonia | 1 | Champion of Macedonian First League | MZT | Skopje | Jane Sandanski Arena (6,000) |

=== Personnel and sponsorship ===
| Team | Head coach | Captain | Kit manufacturer | Shirt sponsor |
|---|---|---|---|---|
| Budućnost | (Montenegro) Luka Pavićević | (Montenegro) Suad Šehović | Luanvi | VOLI |
| Cedevita | (Croatia) Veljko Mršić | (Croatia) Miro Bilan | Nike | Cedevita / Konzum |
| Cibona | (Croatia) Damir Mulaomerović | (Croatia) Marin Rozić | Adidas | Franck |
| Crvena Zvezda | (Montenegro) Dejan Radonjić | (Serbia) Luka Mitrović | Champion | Telekom Srbija |
| Igokea | (Bosnia and Herzegovina) Dragan Bajić | (Serbia) Marko Čakarević | Givova | M:tel / Hemofarm |
| Krka | (Croatia) Vladimir Anzulović | (Slovenia) Matej Rojc | Žolna šport | Krka |
| Mega Leks | (Serbia) Dejan Milojević | (Serbia) Rade Zagorac | Adidas | Beoleks |
| Metalac | (Serbia) Vladimir Đokić | (Serbia) Dušan Kutlešić | Kamp | Farmakom |
| MZT Skopje | (North Macedonia) Aleksandar Jončevski | (North Macedonia) Damjan Stojanovski | Li-Ning | Sinalco / Bauer BG |
| Partizan | (Serbia) Aleksandar Džikić | (Serbia) Vanja Marinković | Adidas | NIS |
| Sutjeska | (Montenegro) Igor Jovović | (Montenegro) Nikola Žižić | PEAK | — |
| Tajfun | (Slovenia) Dejan Mihevc | (Slovenia) Dragiša Drobnjak | Spalding | Tajfun |
| Union Olimpija | (Slovenia) Gašper Potočnik | (Slovenia) Saša Zagorac | Macron | Pivovarna Union |
| Zadar | (Croatia) Ante Nazor | (Croatia) Lovre Bašić | Adidas | OTP banka |

=== Coaching changes ===
| Week | Club | Outgoing coach | Date of change | Incoming coach |
|---|---|---|---|---|
| 3rd | Metalac | (Serbia) Vladimir Đokić | 7 October 2015 | (Serbia) Vladimir Mišković |
| 4th | Metalac | (Serbia) Vladimir Mišković | 12 October 2015 | (Serbia) Vladimir Đokić |
| 11th | Budućnost | (Montenegro) Igor Jovović | 27 November 2015 | (Montenegro) Luka Pavićević |
| 13th | Cibona | (Croatia) Slaven Rimac | 7 December 2015 | (Croatia) Damir Mulaomerović |
| 13th | MZT Skopje | (Slovenia) Aleš Pipan | 7 December 2015 | (North Macedonia) Aleksandar Jončevski |
| 15th | Igokea | (Serbia) Željko Lukajić | 21 December 2015 | (Bosnia and Herzegovina) Dragan Bajić |
| 18th | Partizan | (Serbia) Petar Božić | 5 January 2016 | (Serbia) Aleksandar Džikić |
| 20th | Krka | (Bosnia and Herzegovina) Ivan Velić | 18 January 2016 | (Croatia) Vladimir Anzulović |
| 20th | Sutjeska | (Montenegro) Dušan Dubljević | 24 January 2016 | (Montenegro) Igor Jovović |

== Regular season ==
=== Standings ===
| Pos | Team | Pld | W | L | PF | PA | PD | Pts | Qualification or relegation |
|---|---|---|---|---|---|---|---|---|---|
| 1 | (Montenegro) Budućnost | 26 | 23 | 3 | 2032 | 1774 | +258 | 49 | Qualification to playoffs |
| 2 | (Serbia) Crvena Zvezda | 26 | 20 | 6 | 2046 | 1800 | +246 | 46 | Qualification to playoffs |
| 3 | (Croatia) Cedevita | 26 | 19 | 7 | 2024 | 1879 | +145 | 45 | Qualification to playoffs |
| 4 | (Serbia) Mega Leks | 26 | 17 | 9 | 2051 | 1940 | +111 | 43 | Qualification to playoffs |
| 5 | (Serbia) Partizan | 26 | 12 | 14 | 1973 | 1974 | −1 | 38 | |
| 6 | (Croatia) Zadar | 26 | 12 | 14 | 1808 | 1868 | −60 | 38 | |
| 7 | (Slovenia) Union Olimpija | 26 | 11 | 15 | 1921 | 1955 | −34 | 37 | |
| 8 | (Croatia) Cibona | 26 | 11 | 15 | 1887 | 1936 | −49 | 37 | |
| 9 | (Bosnia and Herzegovina) Igokea | 26 | 11 | 15 | 1839 | 1899 | −60 | 37 | |
| 10 | (North Macedonia) MZT Skopje | 26 | 10 | 16 | 1869 | 1908 | −39 | 36 | |
| 11 | (Serbia) Metalac | 26 | 10 | 16 | 1837 | 1941 | −104 | 36 | |
| 12 | (Slovenia) Krka | 26 | 10 | 16 | 1853 | 1924 | −71 | 36 | |
| 13 | (Montenegro) Sutjeska | 26 | 9 | 17 | 1867 | 2011 | −144 | 35 | Relegated |
| 14 | (Slovenia) Tajfun | 26 | 7 | 19 | 1790 | 1988 | −198 | 33 | Relegated |

Source: ABA Standings

=== Schedule and results ===
The regular season began on October 1, 2015, and ended on March 7, 2016.

| Home \ Away | BUD | CDV | CIB | CZV | IGK | KRK | MEG | MET | MZT | PAR | SUT | TAJ | UOL | ZDR |
|---|---|---|---|---|---|---|---|---|---|---|---|---|---|---|
| (Montenegro) Budućnost | | 76–66 | 78–68 | 68–54 | 89–74 | 81–65 | 71–56 | 83–72 | 65–55 | 78–65 | 89–87 | 81–61 | 89–77 | 78–47 |
| (Croatia) Cedevita | 57–81 | | 83–65 | 74–72 | 67–56 | 70–60 | 78–68 | 77–63 | 89–64 | 75–72 | 73–50 | 94–61 | 82–58 | 81–88 |
| (Croatia) Cibona | 69–91 | 69–81 | | 83–94 | 86–72 | 85–78 | 82–89 | 77–73 | 68–62 | 63–57 | 93–76 | 71–69 | 75–79 | 74–65 |
| (Serbia) Crvena Zvezda | 83–62 | 79–80 | 75–58 | | 81–87 | 77–67 | 76–70 | 86–74 | 92–79 | 92–77 | 96–67 | 113–66 | 73–77 | 83–57 |
| (Bosnia and Herzegovina) Igokea | 76–86 | 86–91 | 68–57 | 54–74 | | 54–65 | 80–75 | 60–66 | 70–86 | 71–64 | 75–58 | 71–82 | 72–63 | 77–73 |
| (Slovenia) Krka | 78–84 | 85–77 | 90–86 | 65–71 | 74–64 | | 74–57 | 70–75 | 72–68 | 70–75 | 58–66 | 103–96 | 55–59 | 77–66 |
| (Serbia) Mega Leks | 81–83 | 100–93 | 76–72 | 78–79 | 69–68 | 84–77 | | 77–64 | 82–70 | 76–59 | 101–72 | 92–70 | 78–81 | 87–61 |
| (Serbia) Metalac | 61–67 | 79–81 | 77–61 | 62–68 | 56–74 | 83–77 | 83–76 | | 68–77 | 67–64 | 84–78 | 78–62 | 74–61 | 71–67 |
| (North Macedonia) MZT | 68–72 | 65–70 | 69–68 | 66–71 | 75–70 | 69–67 | 76–77 | 93–67 | | 82–78 | 71–75 | 77–70 | 81–62 | 60–72 |
| (Serbia) Partizan | 86–77 | 82–61 | 85–82 | 86–81 | 66–73 | 69–70 | 78–85 | 81–70 | 72–69 | | 75–67 | 89–85 | 76–74 | 87–76 |
| (Montenegro) Sutjeska | 92–91 | 68–83 | 68–80 | 62–70 | 72–83 | 87–81 | 68–73 | 84–73 | 68–77 | 82–71 | | 51–60 | 86–78 | 71–60 |
| (Slovenia) Tajfun | 61–80 | 67–78 | 52–74 | 63–73 | 76–81 | 74–51 | 60–64 | 76–63 | 68–62 | 65–83 | 71–68 | | 73–59 | 66–82 |
| (Slovenia) Union Olimpija | 63–67 | 84–91 | 67–68 | 69–77 | 79–63 | 80–50 | 89–99 | 76–62 | 91–76 | 118–115 | 60–61 | 77–69 | | 84–76 |
| (Croatia) Zadar | 52–65 | 81–72 | 62–53 | 49–56 | 69–60 | 67–74 | 76–81 | 88–72 | 84–72 | 65–61 | 85–83 | 73–67 | 67–56 | |

Source: ABA League Calendar
Legend: Blue = home team win; Yellow = draw; Red = away team win.

== Playoffs ==
Semifinals
1 | (Montenegro) Budućnost | 81 | 75
4 | (Serbia) Mega Leks | 85 | 76
2 | (Serbia) Crvena Zvezda | 97 | 73
3 | (Croatia) Cedevita | 88 | 65

Finals
(Serbia) Mega Leks | 88 | 74 | 49
(Serbia) Crvena Zvezda | 95 | 93 | 61

=== Semifinals ===
==== Game 1 ====
| 14 March 2016 | Budućnost (Montenegro) | 81–85 | (Serbia) Mega Leks | Podgorica |
| 20:00 (CET) | Scoring by quarter: 15–24, 28–18, 19–18, 19–25 |
| | Pts: Jenkins 26; Rebs: Marić 9 Asts: Cook 5 PIR: Jenkins 24 | Boxscore | Pts: Zagorac 27; Rebs: Luwawu, Zagorac 7 Asts: Ivanović 12; PIR: Zagorac 40 | Arena: Morača Sports Center; Attendance: 4,560; Referees: (Croatia) Srđan Dožai (Slovenia) Matej Boltauzer (Croatia) Siniša Herceg |

| 15 March 2016 | Crvena Zvezda (Serbia) | 97–88(OT) | (Croatia) Cedevita | Belgrade |
| 18:45 (CET) | Scoring by quarter: 22–14, 15–29, 19–13, 26–26, Overtime: 15–6 |
| | Pts: Miller 24; Rebs: Zirbes 11; Asts: Jović 8 PIR: Zirbes 29 | Boxscore | Pts: Pullen 24; Rebs: White 12; Asts: Pullen 5 PIR: White 29 | Arena: Hall Aleksandar Nikolić; Attendance: 6,286; Referees: (Slovenia) Saša Pukl (Slovenia) Damir Javor (Montenegro) Miloš Koljenšić |

==== Game 2 ====
| 19 March 2016 | Mega Leks (Serbia) | 76–75 | (Montenegro) Budućnost | Sremska Mitrovica |
| 21:00 (CET) | Scoring by quarter: 22–24, 22–16, 18–15, 14–20 |
| | Pts: Luwawu 17; Rebs: Ivanović, Simeunović 8 Asts: Ivanović 8 PIR: Ivanović 21 | Boxscore | Pts: Dragićević 20; Rebs: Marić 13; Asts: Se. Šehović 5 PIR: Dragićević 20 | Arena: Sports Hall Pinki; Attendance: 2,500; Referees: (Croatia) Sreten Radović (Bosnia and Herzegovina) Petar Obradović (Croatia) Tomislav Hordov |

| 22 March 2016 | Cedevita (Croatia) | 65–73 | (Serbia) Crvena Zvezda | Zagreb |
| 20:00 (CET) | Scoring by quarter: 19–16, 20–18, 10–21, 16–18 |
| | Pts: Pullen 17; Rebs: Bilan 7 Asts: four players 2 PIR: Pullen 12 | Boxscore | Pts: Štimac 17; Rebs: Zirbes 9 Asts: Jović 6 PIR: Miller 20 | Arena: Dom Sportova; Attendance: 3,300; Referees: (Slovenia) Saša Pukl (Slovenia) Damir Javor (Slovenia) Sašo Petek |

=== Finals ===
| 28 April 2016 Game 1 | Crvena Zvezda (Serbia) | 95–88 | (Serbia) Mega Leks | Belgrade |
| 19:00 (CEST) | Scoring by quarter: 27–25, 21–20, 20–25, 27–18 |
| | Pts: Miller, Zirbes 17; Rebs: Zirbes 12; Asts: Jović 9 PIR: Zirbes 29 | Boxscore | Pts: Ivanović 25; Rebs: Nikolić 6 Asts: Ivanović 6 PIR: Ivanović 28 | Arena: Hall Aleksandar Nikolić; Attendance: 2,586; Referees: (Croatia) Sreten Radović (Serbia) Milivoje Jovčić (Croatia) Siniša Herceg |

| 30 April 2016 Game 2 | Crvena Zvezda (Serbia) | 93–74 | (Serbia) Mega Leks | Belgrade |
| 20:00 (CEST) | Scoring by quarter: 26–21, 26–18, 20–21, 21–14 |
| | Pts: Simonović 16; Rebs: three players 5 Asts: Jović 9 PIR: Jović 20 | Boxscore | Pts: Ivanović 22; Rebs: Nikolić 7 Asts: Ivanović 5 PIR: Ivanović 22 | Arena: Hall Aleksandar Nikolić; Attendance: 3,000; Referees: (Serbia) Ilija Belošević (Bosnia and Herzegovina) Petar Obradović (Serbia) Saša Maričić |

| 2 May 2016 Game 3 | Mega Leks (Serbia) | 49–61 | (Serbia) Crvena Zvezda | Sremska Mitrovica |
| 20:30 (CEST) | Scoring by quarter: 16–24, 18–13, 6–9, 9–15 |
| | Pts: Zagorac 21; Rebs: Janković 8 Asts: Ivanović 6 PIR: Zagorac 22 | Boxscore | Pts: Miller 18; Rebs: Miller 8 Asts: Jović 6 PIR: Miller 19 | Arena: Sports Hall Pinki; Attendance: 2,500; Referees: (Slovenia) Saša Pukl (Croatia) Srđan Dožai (Serbia) Marko Juras |

2015–16 ABA League Champions
(Serbia)
Crvena Zvezda
2nd title

==== 2015–2016 Crvena Zvezda Team Roster ====
| Position(s) | Name |
|---|---|
| G/F | (United States) Tarence Kinsey |
| PG | (Serbia) Nikola Rebić |
| G/F | (Serbia) Nemanja Dangubić |
| PF | (Serbia) Luka Mitrović |
| G/F | (Serbia) Branko Lazić |
| F | (Serbia) Boriša Simanić |
| PG | (Serbia) Vasilije Micić |
| SF | (Serbia) Marko Simonović |
| C | (Serbia) Stefan Nastić |
| SG | (Serbia) Marko Gudurić |
| PG | (Serbia) Stefan Jović |
| F | (United States) Quincy Miller |
| C | (Germany) Maik Zirbes |
| C | (Serbia) Vladimir Štimac |
| Head Coach | (Montenegro) Dejan Radonjić |

== Individual statistics ==
=== Rating ===
| Rank | Name | Team | Games | Rating | PIR |
|---|---|---|---|---|---|
| 1. | (Croatia) Miro Bilan | (Croatia) Cedevita | 28 | 575 | 20.54 |
| 2. | (Serbia) Sava Lešić | (Slovenia) Olimpija | 26 | 448 | 18.88 |
| 3. | (Croatia) Ante Žižić | (Croatia) Cibona | 21 | 379 | 18.05 |
| 4. | (United States) Kevin Jones | (Serbia) Partizan | 19 | 332 | 17.47 |
| 5. | (Montenegro) Nemanja Vranješ | (Montenegro) Sutjeska | 23 | 396 | 17.22 |

=== Points ===
| Rank | Name | Team | Games | Points | PPG |
|---|---|---|---|---|---|
| 1. | (Serbia) Tadija Dragićević | (Montenegro) Budućnost | 26 | 424 | 16.31 |
| 2. | (United States) Kevin Jones | (Serbia) Partizan | 19 | 310 | 16.32 |
| 3. | (Serbia) Sava Lešić | (Slovenia) Olimpija | 26 | 395 | 15.19 |
| 4. | (Serbia) Đorđe Drenovac | (North Macedonia) MZT Skopje | 26 | 388 | 14.92 |
| 5. | (Montenegro) Nemanja Vranješ | (Montenegro) Sutjeska | 23 | 337 | 14.65 |

=== Rebounds ===
| Rank | Name | Team | Games | Rebounds | RPG |
|---|---|---|---|---|---|
| 1. | (Croatia) Ante Žižić | (Croatia) Cibona | 21 | 168 | 8.00 |
| 2. | (United States) Kevin Jones | (Serbia) Partizan | 19 | 149 | 7.84 |
| 3. | (Croatia) Miro Bilan | (Croatia) Cedevita | 28 | 217 | 7.75 |
| 4. | (Serbia) Sava Lešić | (Slovenia) Olimpija | 26 | 200 | 7.69 |
| 5. | (Australia) Aleks Marić | (Montenegro) Budućnost | 26 | 184 | 7.08 |

=== Assists ===
| Rank | Name | Team | Games | Assists | APG |
|---|---|---|---|---|---|
| 1. | (Montenegro) Omar Cook | (Montenegro) Budućnost | 28 | 181 | 6.46 |
| 2. | (Serbia) Stefan Jović | (Serbia) Crvena Zvezda | 27 | 145 | 5.37 |
| 3. | (Montenegro) Nikola Ivanović | (Serbia) Mega Leks | 26 | 134 | 5.15 |
| 4. | (Serbia) Marko Ljubičić | (North Macedonia) MZT Skopje | 25 | 103 | 4.12 |
| 5. | (Serbia) Vuk Radivojević | (Bosnia and Herzegovina) Igokea | 25 | 91 | 3.64 |

Source: ABA League Individual Statistics

== MVP List ==
=== MVP of the Round (Note: Unlike the previous seasons in the 2015–16 season only players playing for winning teams could be named MVP of the Round.) ===
| Round | Player | Team | Efficiency |
|---|---|---|---|
| 1 | (Serbia) Rade Zagorac | (Serbia) Mega Leks | 29 |
| 2 | (Croatia) Miro Bilan | (Croatia) Cedevita | 33 |
| 3 | (Montenegro) Suad Šehović | (Montenegro) Budućnost | 30 |
| 4 | (Serbia) Marko Luković | (North Macedonia) MZT | 28 |
| 5 | (Australia) Aleks Marić | (Montenegro) Budućnost | 32 |
| 6 | (Croatia) Ive Ivanov | (Slovenia) Krka | 27 |
| 7 | (Croatia) Jure Lalić | (Slovenia) Krka | 25 |
| 8 | (Montenegro) Nikola Ivanović | (Serbia) Mega Leks | 31 |
| 9 | (Croatia) Ante Žižić | (Croatia) Cibona | 30 |
| 10 | (Croatia) Ante Delaš | (Croatia) Zadar | 33 |
| 11 | (Croatia) Jure Lalić (2) | (Slovenia) Krka | 35 |
| 12 | (Serbia) Tadija Dragićević | (Montenegro) Budućnost | 30 |
| 13 | (Serbia) Tadija Dragićević (2) | (Montenegro) Budućnost | 25 |
| 14 | (Croatia) Miro Bilan (2) | (Croatia) Cedevita | 37 |
| 15 | (Croatia) Miro Bilan (3) | (Croatia) Cedevita | 28 |
| 16 | (Croatia) Miro Bilan (4) | (Croatia) Cedevita | 35 |
| 17 | (Serbia) Vuk Radivojević | (Bosnia and Herzegovina) Igokea | 30 |
| 18 | (Montenegro) Nemanja Vranješ | (Montenegro) Sutjeska | 42 |
| 19 | (United States) Glenn Cosey | (Croatia) Zadar | 30 |
| 20 | (Serbia) Aleksandar Cvetković | (Serbia) Partizan | 42 |
| 21 | (Croatia) Miro Bilan (5) | (Croatia) Cedevita | 30 |
| 22 | (Germany) Maik Zirbes | (Serbia) Crvena Zvezda | 36 |
| 23 | (United States) James White | (Croatia) Cedevita | 26 |
| 24 | (Germany) Maik Zirbes (2) | (Serbia) Crvena Zvezda | 34 |
| 25 | (Serbia) Vuk Radivojević (2) | (Bosnia and Herzegovina) Igokea | 31 |
| 26 | (Serbia) Sava Lešić | (Slovenia) Olimpija | 43 |
| SF1 | (Serbia) Rade Zagorac (2) | (Serbia) Mega Leks | 40 |
| SF2 | (Montenegro) Nikola Ivanović (2) | (Serbia) Mega Leks | 21 |
| F1 | (Germany) Maik Zirbes (3) | (Serbia) Crvena Zvezda | 29 |
| F2 | (Serbia) Stefan Jović | (Serbia) Crvena Zvezda | 20 |
| F3 | (United States) Quincy Miller | (Serbia) Crvena Zvezda | 19 |

Source: ABA League MVP List

=== MVP of the Month ===
| Month | Player | Team | Ref. |
|---|---|---|---|
| October 2015 | (Montenegro) Suad Šehović | (Montenegro) Budućnost | |
| November 2015 | (Croatia) Miro Bilan | (Croatia) Cedevita | |
| December 2015 | (Croatia) Miro Bilan (2) | (Croatia) Cedevita | |
| January 2016 | (Serbia) Tadija Dragićević | (Montenegro) Budućnost | |
| February 2016 | (Germany) Maik Zirbes | (Serbia) Crvena Zvezda | |

== The ideal five of the season ==
The ideal five of the season were selected by head coaches, fans and the ABA League Commission, with the coaches contributing 60%, the fans 30% and the Commission 10% of the votes for the final result.

| Position | Name | Team |
|---|---|---|
| PG | (Georgia (country)) Jacob Pullen | (Croatia) Cedevita |
| SG | (France) Timothe Luwawu | (Serbia) Mega Leks |
| SF | (Serbia) Tadija Dragićević | (Montenegro) Budućnost |
| PF | (Croatia) Miro Bilan | (Croatia) Cedevita |
| C | (Germany) Maik Zirbes | (Serbia) Crvena zvezda |

== ABA League clubs in European competitions ==
| Competition | Team | Progress | Result |
|---|---|---|---|
| Euroleague | (Serbia) Crvena Zvezda | Playoffs | Eliminated by (Russia) CSKA Moscow, 0–3 |
| Euroleague | (Croatia) Cedevita | Top 16 Group E | 8th place |
| Eurocup | (Slovenia) Union Olimpija | Last 32 Group M | 4th place |
| Eurocup | (Montenegro) Budućnost | Regular Season Group D | 5th place |
| FIBA Europe Cup | (Croatia) Cibona | Quarter-finals | Eliminated by (Russia) Enisey Krasnoyarsk, 1–2 |
| FIBA Europe Cup | (Slovenia) Krka | Round of 32 Group O | 3rd place |
| FIBA Europe Cup | (Slovenia) Tajfun | Regular Season Group F | 4th place |
