= Ognjen Kuzmić =

Serbian basketball player

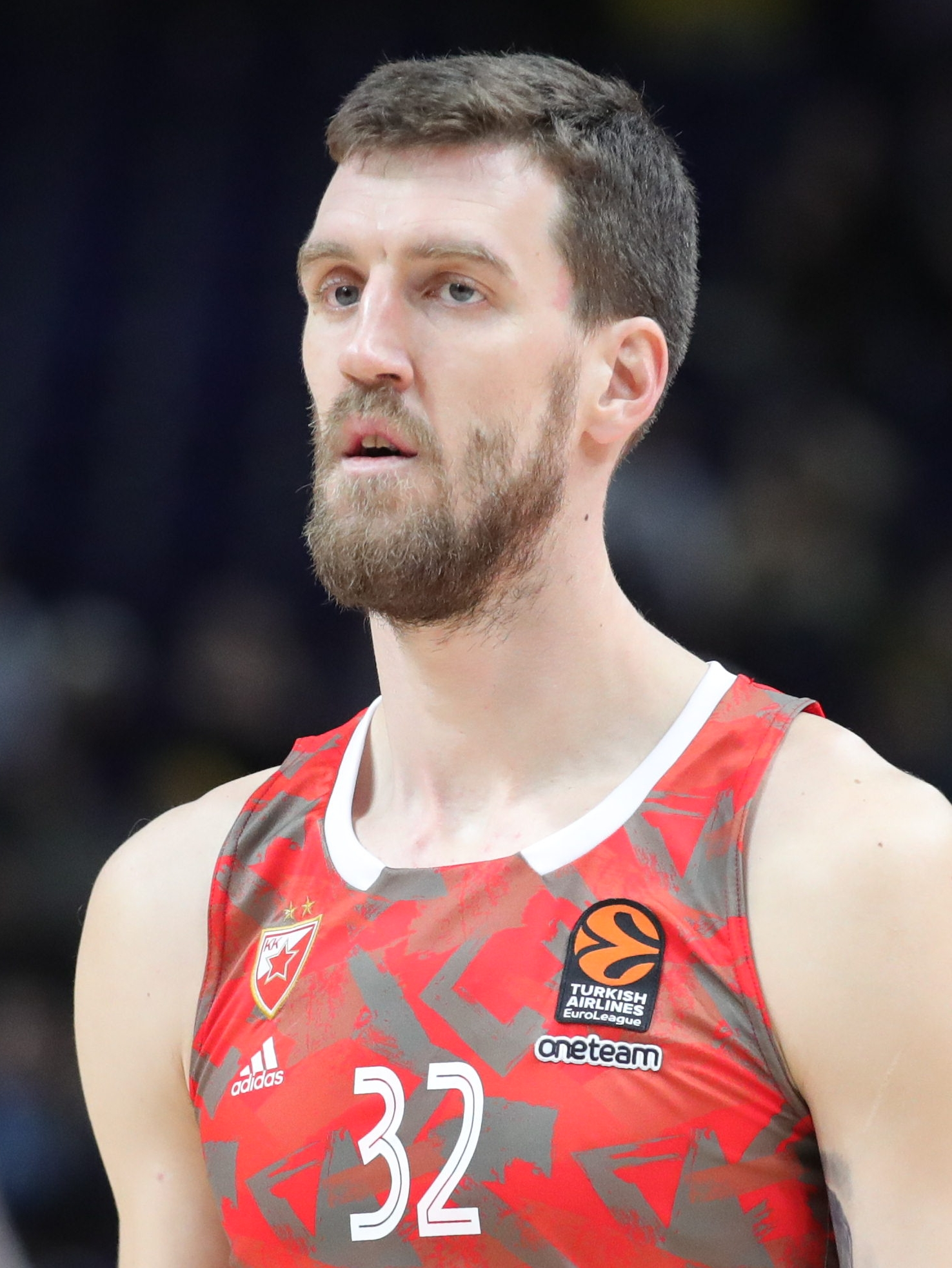
- Kuzmić with Crvena zvezda in 2022

Personal information
- Born: May 16, 1990 (age 36) Doboj, SR Bosnia and Herzegovina; SFR Yugoslavia
- Listed height: 2.14 m (7 ft 0 in)
- Listed weight: 116 kg (256 lb)

Career information
- NBA draft: 2012: 2nd round, 52nd overall pick
- Drafted by: Golden State Warriors
- Playing career: 2007–2025
- Position: Center
- Number: 1, 32

Career history
- 2007–2008: Borac Banja Luka
- 2008–2010: Korihait
- 2010: Korikobrat
- 2010–2011: Čelik Zenica
- 2011–2013: Málaga
- 2011–2012: →Axarquía
- 2012–2013: →Joventut
- 2013–2015: Golden State Warriors
- 2013–2015: →Santa Cruz Warriors
- 2015–2016: Panathinaikos
- 2016–2017: Crvena zvezda
- 2017–2019: Real Madrid
- 2019–2023: Crvena zvezda
- 2020: →FMP
- 2023–2025: FMP

Career highlights
- NBA champion (2015); EuroLeague champion (2018); 3× ABA League champion (2017, 2021, 2022); 4× Serbian League champion (2017, 2021–2023); 4× Serbian Cup winner (2017, 2021–2023); Greek Cup winner (2016); NBA D-League champion (2015); NBA D-League All-Defensive Third Team (2015)
- Stats at NBA.com
- Stats at Basketball Reference
Medals
Men's basketball
Representing Serbia
EuroBasket
Silver medal – second place	2017 Finland–Israel–Romania–Turkey

Ognjen Kuzmić (Serbian Cyrillic: Огњен Кузмић, pronounced [ǒɡɲen kûzmit͡ɕ]; born May 16, 1990) is a Serbian former professional basketball player. He has also represented the senior Serbian national team in international competition. Standing at 2.13 m (7 ft 0 in), he played at the center position. He was selected with the 52nd overall pick in the 2012 NBA draft by the Golden State Warriors and won the 2015 NBA Championship with the same team.

== Professional career ==
Kuzmić started his senior career in Borac Banja Luka and the first basketball steps began in Findo Doboj. After one season, he left to play for Korihait in the Finnish league. In 2010, he returned to Bosnia to play for KK Čelik Zenica.

In 2011, he signed with Unicaja Málaga but played the 2011–12 season with farm team, Clínicas Rincón Benahavís of the Spanish Second League. He also played two games with Unicaja.

In 2012, Unicaja Málaga loaned him to Joventut Badalona.

On September 27, 2013, he signed with the Golden State Warriors. During his rookie and sophomore seasons, he had multiple assignments with the Santa Cruz Warriors of the NBA Development League, earning a mention to the All-NBA Development League Defensive Third Team and winning a D-League championship during the 2014–15 season. To add to his D-League title, he was part of Golden State's championship winning team who defeated the Cleveland Cavaliers in the 2015 NBA Finals. Kuzmić failed to appear in any post-season action due to a recurring left ankle injury.

On July 27, 2015, he signed a two-year deal with the Greek club Panathinaikos. On April 21, 2016, he left PAO.

On July 19, 2016, Kuzmić signed a three-year contract with Crvena zvezda. Kuzmić was named MVP for the month of January in the 2016–17 EuroLeague season.

On July 26, 2017, Kuzmić signed a two-year deal with Real Madrid. In October 2017, he tore the ACL in his left knee and was sidelined for the rest of the season. He returned on the court in 2018–19 season, but soon injured his right ankle and missed considerable time. After recovering from injury, he fell out of Real Madrid's rotation and appeared in only 12 games till the end of the season.

On July 3, 2019, Kuzmić signed a two-year contract for Crvena zvezda. On October 24, 2019, Kuzmić made a season debut against Barcelona, less than four months after sustaining severe injuries in traffic accident. In February 2020, he was loaned to FMP for the rest of the 2019–20 season. On July 27, 2023, Kuzmić renewed his contract through 2025. On Christmas Day 2023, Kuzmić mutually parted ways with the Serbian powerhouse.

He ended his professional basketball career on June 24, 2025.

== Career statistics ==
Legend
GP	Games played	GS	Games started	MPG	Minutes per game
FG%	Field-goal percentage	3P%	3-point field-goal percentage	FT%	Free-throw percentage
RPG	Rebounds per game	APG	Assists per game	SPG	Steals per game
BPG	Blocks per game	PPG	Points per game	PIR	Performance index rating
**Bold**	Career high

=== NBA ===
†	Denotes seasons in which Kuzmić won the NBA

==== Regular season ====
Year	Team	GP	GS	MPG	FG%	3P%	FT%	RPG	APG	SPG	BPG	PPG
2013–14	Golden State	**21**	0	4.4	.385	—	.455	1.0	.1	**.1**	**.2**	.7
2014–15†	Golden State	16	0	**4.5**	**.667**	—	**1.000**	**1.1**	**.4**	**.1**	.1	**1.3**
Career		37	0	4.4	.520	—	.600	1.0	.2	.1	.1	.9

==== Playoffs ====
Year	Team	GP	GS	MPG	FG%	3P%	FT%	RPG	APG	SPG	BPG	PPG
2014	Golden State	3	0	2.7	—	—	—	1.3	.0	.0	.0	.0
Career		3	0	2.7	—	—	—	1.3	.0	.0	.0	.0

=== EuroLeague ===
†	Denotes seasons in which Kuzmić won the EuroLeague

Year	Team	GP	GS	MPG	FG%	3P%	FT%	RPG	APG	SPG	BPG	PPG	PIR
2015–16	Panathinaikos	25	18	13.8	.480	—	.682	4.1	.3	.4	.3	5.1	6.1
2016–17	Crvena zvezda	30	**30**	**20.7**	.549	—	.707	**7.0**	1.0	**1.0**	**.6**	**9.4**	**13.9**
2017–18†	Real Madrid	2	0	4.5	.333	—	—	2.0	—	—	—	1.0	0.5
2018–19	Real Madrid	5	1	6.8	.364	—	.600	2.6	—	.2	.4	2.2	2.0
2019–20	Crvena zvezda	19	16	12.9	.620	—	**.813**	3.5	.6	.2	.2	3.9	5.4
2020–21	Crvena zvezda	32	25	13.9	.544	—	.641	3.9	.3	.3	.3	3.8	6.1
2021–22	Crvena zvezda	**33**	29	17.6	.567	—	.600	5.1	.4	.5	.3	5.4	8.2
2022–23	Crvena zvezda	21	16	9.2	**.711**	—	.600	2.4	.4	.2	.1	3.0	4.7
2023–24	Crvena zvezda	3	1	6.7	.000	—	—	2.3	**1.7**	—	.3	0.0	2.0
Career		170	136	14.7	.548	—	.668	4.4	.5	.5	.3	5.1	7.4

== National team career ==
Being a Bosnian Serb, Kuzmić was eligible to play for either Bosnia and Herzegovina or Serbia. In May 2013, he turned down a call-up from Bosnia and Herzegovina's head coach Aleksandar Petrović for their EuroBasket 2013 training camp.

In May 2014, Kuzmić publicly stated his desire to play for the Serbian national team. In June 2014, national team head coach Aleksandar Đorđević included him on the preliminary 29-player list for the twelve 2014 World Cup roster spots. Three weeks later, in early July 2014, Kuzmić further made Đorđević's shortened list of 20 players invited for the training camp, however, a fibula injury he picked up during the 2014 NBA Summer League ruled him out.

=== EuroBasket 2015 ===
The following summer at EuroBasket 2015, Kuzmić represented Serbia for the first time at a major tournament. In the first phase of the tournament, the team led by head coach Aleksandar Đorđević dominated its round-robin group with a 5–0 record, and then eliminated Finland and Czech Republic in the round-of-16 and quarterfinal games, respectively. However, they were stopped in the semifinal game by Lithuania 67–64, and later lost 68–81 to the host team France in the bronze-medal game. Over 9 tournament games, Kuzmić averaged 3.1 points and 3.0 rebounds on 50% shooting from the field.

=== EuroBasket 2017 ===
Kuzmić also represented Serbia at the EuroBasket 2017 where they won the silver medal, after losing in the final game to Slovenia. Over 9 tournament games, he averaged 7.1 points, 5.1 rebounds and 1.3 assists per game.

On 1 July 2019, Kuzmić was selected to the Serbia 18-man preliminary roster for the 2019 FIBA Basketball World Cup in China. On 15 July 2019, he was excluded from consideration due to the unpredictability of the recovery from the traffic accident he had been involved in a day earlier. Nikola Jovanović was called up in Kuzmić's place.

== Personal life ==
=== 2019 traffic accident ===
In the morning hours of 14 July 2019 on the Banja Luka-Prijedor state road near the village of Ramići, Kuzmić was involved in a serious traffic accident. Driving his Porsche Cayenne SUV, the twenty-nine-year-old professional basketball player reportedly collided with a BMW vehicle going in the opposite direction while traveling at a high speed. He sustained life-threatening injuries in the accident, breaking his maxilla and mandible head bones (upper and lower jaws), as well as his chest. He was immediately placed in induced coma and airlifted via helicopter to the Clinical Centre of Serbia in Belgrade. Reportedly, thirty-year-old Bosnian professional boxer Dražan Janjanin was a passenger in the car that collided with Kuzmić's car.

Three days later, on 17 July 2019, Kuzmić underwent a surgery in which surgeons removed severe maxillofacial injuries. The next day after the surgery, 18 July 2019, he woke up from the coma. On 25 July 2019, Kuzmić was discharged from the hospital to home care.

== See also ==
- List of Serbian NBA players
