= Stefan Jović =

Serbian basketball player (born 1990)

Stefan Jović Стефан Јовић
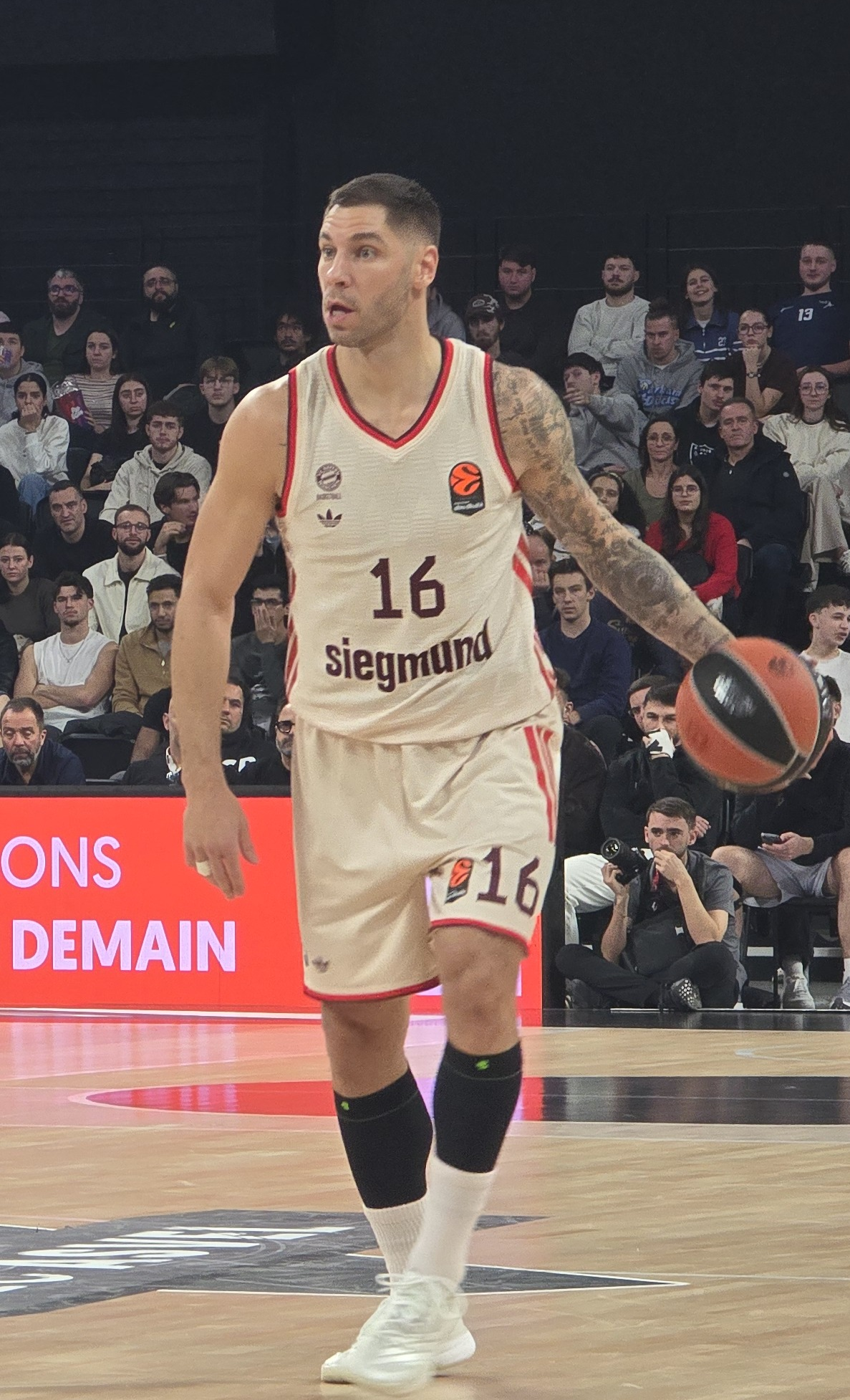
- Jović with Bayern Munich in 2025

No. 24 – Aris Thessaloniki
- Position: Point guard
- League: GBL; EuroCup

Personal information
- Born: November 3, 1990 (age 36) Niš, SR Serbia, Yugoslavia
- Listed height: 1.98 m (6 ft 6 in)
- Listed weight: 94 kg (207 lb)

Career information
- NBA draft: 2012: undrafted
- Playing career: 2010–present

Career history
- 2010–2012: Sloga
- 2012–2014: Radnički Kragujevac
- 2014–2017: Crvena zvezda
- 2017–2019: Bayern Munich
- 2019–2021: Khimki Moscow
- 2022: Panathinaikos
- 2022–2023: Zaragoza
- 2023–2025: Valencia
- 2025–2026: Bayern Munich
- 2026–present: Aris Thessaloniki

Career highlights
- 2× German League champion (2018, 2019); All-German Bundesliga First Team (2018); 3× ABA League champion (2015–2017); ABA League Finals MVP (2016); All-ABA League Team (2017); 3× BLS champion (2015–2017); German Cup (2018); 2× Serbian Cup winner (2015, 2017)
Medals
Men's basketball
Representing Serbia
Summer Olympics
Silver medal – second place	2016 Rio de Janeiro	Team
World Cup
Silver medal – second place	2014 Spain
Silver medal – second place	2023 Philippines–Japan–Indonesia
EuroBasket
Silver medal – second place	2017 Finland–Israel–Romania–Turkey
Universiade
Bronze medal – third place	2013 Kazan	Team
Mediterranean Games
Silver medal – second place	2013 Mersin	Team

Stefan Jović (Serbian Cyrillic: Стефан Јовић, born November 3, 1990) is a Serbian professional basketball player for Aris Thessaloniki of the Greek Basketball League (GBL) and the EuroCup. He also represents the senior Serbian national team in international competition. Standing at 1.98 m (6 ft 6 in), he plays at the point guard position.

== Club career ==
Jović played in the youth system of Ergonom from his hometown Niš. From 2010 to 2012 he played with Sloga. In July 2012, he signed a three-year contract with Radnički.

=== Crvena zvezda (2014–2017) ===
On September 21, 2014, he signed a three-year deal with Crvena zvezda. In the 2014–15 season, his first with the club, Crvena zvezda won the ABA League championship, the Serbian League championship and the Serbian Cup. He also appeared in 19 games in the EuroLeague, averaging 2.9 points, 2.8 assists and 2.1 rebounds.

On November 12, 2015, in a road game against Bayern Munich, he set the Euroleague record for the most assists in a single game – 19. In May 2016, he was named MVP of the 2015–16 ABA League Finals.

On September 8, 2016, he re-signed with the team until the end of the 2017–18 season. On October 3, 2016, in a home game against Cedevita, he recorded 16 assists in 24 minutes.

=== Bayern Munich (2017–2019) ===
On July 14, 2017, Jović signed a two-year deal with German team Bayern Munich. In his first season with the team, Jović with Bayern lifted the 2017–18 Basketball Bundesliga championship trophy by defeating Alba Berlin with 3–2 in the final series. Over 40 games league games, he averaged 7.4 points and 5.3 assists, while shooting 54.7% from the field goal. In EuroCup, he appeared in 15 games and averaged 5.3 points and 5.6 assists per game.

In 2018–19 season, Jović appeared in 35 games of the Bundesliga and averaged 6.3 points and 4.8 assists, while shooting 44.4% from the field goal. Bayern eventually defended the championship trophy by defeating Alba Berlin with 3–0 in the final series of 2018–19 Basketball Bundesliga. In the EuroLeague, he averaged 8.3 points and 4.6 assists over 23 games played.

=== Khimki (2019–2021) ===
On July 17, 2019, Jović signed a contract with the Russian team Khimki. On October 3, 2019, Jović left the court with back pain in a game against Maccabi Tel Aviv. During the 2019–2020 season with Khimki, Jović averaged 7.6 points, 4.2 assists and 1.3 steals per contest in a total of 23 EuroLeague games. In the following season, he appeared in only 8 EuroLeague contests due to personal injuries and the club's dire financial situation, with a stat line of 4.4 points, 3.8 assists and 2 rebounds per game.

=== Panathinaikos (2022) ===
On January 7, 2022, Jović signed a contract with Panathinaikos of the Greek Basket League and the EuroLeague for the remainder of the 2021–22 season, with the option for an additional season. In 5 Greek Basket League games, he averaged 3.4 points, 1.4 rebounds and 2 assists, playing around 13 minutes per contest. Additionally, in 4 EuroLeague games, he averaged 3.5 points, 2.5 rebounds and 2.2 assists, playing around 21 minutes per contest. His season as a whole was heavily plagued with various injuries and he never fully entered the team's rotation.

=== Zaragoza (2022–2023) ===
On December 12, 2022, he signed with Basket Zaragoza of the Liga ACB.

=== Aris Thessaloniki (2026–present) ===
On July 19, 2026, Jović signed a 1+1 contract with Aris Thessaloniki of the Greek Basketball League (GBL).

== National team career ==
In the youth category, Jović was a member of the squad that won the silver medal at the 2013 Mediterranean Games and bronze medal at the 2013 University Games. He was also a member of the Serbian national basketball team that won silver medals at the 2014 FIBA Basketball World Cup and the 2016 Summer Olympics.

Jović also represented Serbia at the EuroBasket 2017 where they won the silver medal, after losing in the final game to Slovenia. Over 9 tournament games, he averaged 6.4 points, 2.4 rebounds and 5.4 assists per game.

At the 2019 FIBA Basketball World Cup, the national team of Serbia was dubbed as favorite to win the trophy, but was eventually upset in the quarterfinals by Argentina. With wins over the United States and Czech Republic, it finished in fifth place. With yet another absence of team's captain Teodosić due to injury, Jović emerged as the starting point guard of the team and averaged 7 points, 3.9 rebounds and 5.4 assists per game.

== Career achievements and awards ==
Club

- Serbian League champion: 3 (with Crvena zvezda: 2014–15, 2015–16, 2016–17)
- German League champion: 2 (with Bayern Munich: 2017–18, 2018–19)
- Serbian Radivoj Korać Cup winner: 2 (with Crvena zvezda: 2014–15, 2016–17)
- Adriatic League champion: 3 (with Crvena zvezda: 2015, 2015–16, 2016–17)

Individual

- ABA League Finals MVP: (2016)
- All-ABA League Team: (2017)
- 2× Niš Sportsperson of the Year: 2014, 2016.

== Career statistics ==
Legend
GP	Games played	GS	Games started	MPG	Minutes per game
FG%	Field-goal percentage	3P%	3-point field-goal percentage	FT%	Free-throw percentage
RPG	Rebounds per game	APG	Assists per game	SPG	Steals per game
BPG	Blocks per game	PPG	Points per game	PIR	Performance index rating
**Bold**	Career high

=== EuroLeague ===
*	Led the league

Year	Team	GP	GS	MPG	FG%	3P%	FT%	RPG	APG	SPG	BPG	PPG	PIR
2014–15	Crvena zvezda	19	1	13.6	.361	.261	.625	2.1	2.8	1.0	**.1**	2.9	4.8
2015–16	Crvena zvezda	**27**	22	23.2	.408	.356	**.788**	**3.0**	**5.7**	1.2	**.1**	7.0	9.7
2016–17	Crvena zvezda	23	**23**	**23.9**	.426	.291	.613	2.1	5.6	**1.3**	—	7.5	9.3
2018–19	Bayern Munich	23	17	21.5	.510	.400	.741	2.4	4.6	**1.3**	.0	**8.3**	**10.2**
2019–20	Khimki	23	17	23.2	**.577**	.532*	.618	1.9	4.2	**1.3**	**.1**	7.6	10.0
2020–21	Khimki	8	2	23.0	.464	**.538**	.500	2.0	3.8	1.0	**.1**	4.4	7.0
2021–22	Panathinaikos	4	1	21.5	.333	.500	—	2.5	2.3	1.0	—	3.5	4.8
2023–24	Valencia	**27**	4	17.0	.535	.303	.607	1.9	2.9	.9	.0	4.9	7.0
Career		154	87	20.7	.467	.378	.667	2.3	4.2	1.1	.1	6.3	8.4

== Personal life ==
Jović plays the guitar.

== See also ==
- List of Olympic medalists in basketball
- List of KK Crvena zvezda players with 100 games played
