= Marko Simonović (basketball, born 1986) =

Serbian basketball player

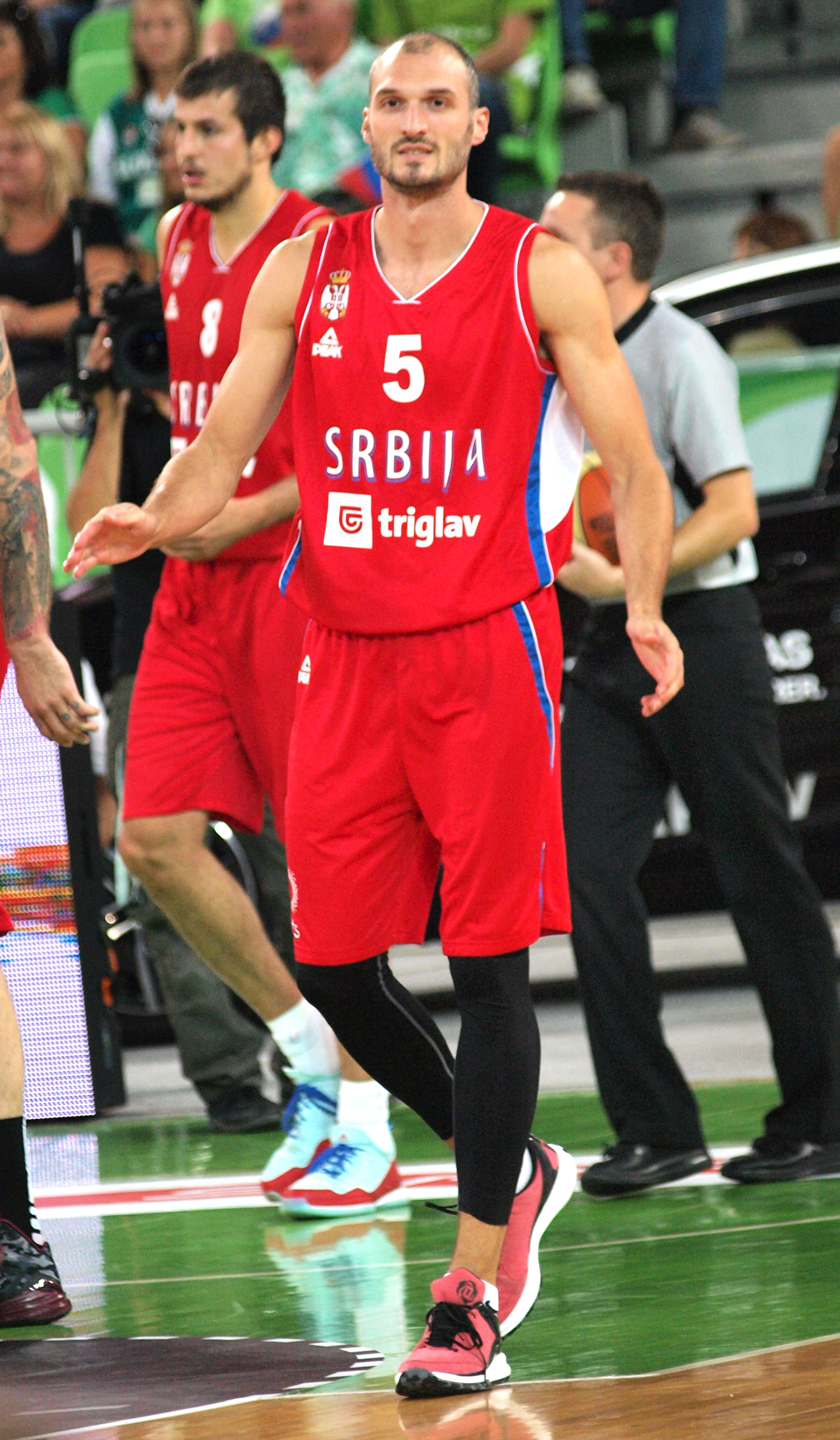
- Simonović playing for Serbia in 2015

Sutjeska
- Title: Head coach
- League: ABA League 2 Montenegrin League

Personal information
- Born: 30 May 1986 (age 40) Priština, SR Serbia, SFR Yugoslavia
- Listed height: 2.03 m (6 ft 8 in)
- Listed weight: 95 kg (209 lb)

Career information
- NBA draft: 2008: undrafted
- Playing career: 2003–2022
- Position: Small forward
- Number: 12, 19, 22
- Coaching career: 2022–present

Career history

Playing
- 2003–2005: Lavovi 063
- 2005–2006: Ergonom
- 2006: Oostende
- 2006–2008: Hemofarm
- 2008–2011: Budućnost
- 2011–2012: Alba Berlin
- 2012–2014: Crvena zvezda
- 2014–2015: Pau-Orthez
- 2015–2017: Crvena zvezda
- 2017–2019: Zenit Saint Petersburg
- 2019–2020: Cedevita Olimpija
- 2020: →Unicaja
- 2020–2022: Crvena zvezda

Coaching
- 2022: Crvena zvezda (assistant)
- 2023–2024: SPD Radnički
- 2025–present: Sutjeska

Career highlights
- As player: 4× ABA League champion (2016, 2017, 2021, 2022); 4× Serbian League champion (2016, 2017, 2021, 2022); 3× Montenegrin League champion (2009–2011); 3× Montenegrin Cup winner (2009–2011); 5× Serbian Cup winner (2013, 2014, 2017, 2021, 2022); All-ABA League Team (2017)
Medals
Men's basketball
Representing Serbia
Summer Olympics
Silver medal – second place	2016 Rio de Janeiro	Team
World Cup
Silver medal – second place	2014 Spain
Universiade
Gold medal – first place	2009 Belgrade	Team
Silver medal – second place	2007 Bangkok	Team

Marko Simonović (Serbian Cyrillic: Марко Симоновић, born 30 May 1986) is a Serbian professional basketball coach and former professional basketball player who is the current head coach for Sutjeska of the Prva A Liga and ABA League Second Division. As a player, he represented the senior Serbian national basketball team internationally. Standing at 2.03 m (6 ft 8 in), he played at the small forward position.

== Professional career ==
Simonović began his professional career in 2003 with Lavovi 063 where he stayed for two seasons. In 2005, he then moved to Ergonom. In 2006, he moved the Belgian team Oostende, only being there for half-season. In the summer of 2006, he signed with Serbian team Hemofarm, staying with them until the summer of 2008. He then moved to the Montenegrin team Budućnost Podgorica, staying with them for three full seasons. With them he won three consecutive times the Montenegrin League championship and Montenegrin Cup, from 2009 until 2011.

On 18 July 2011, Simonović signed a contract with German team Alba Berlin. Over the season he averaged 6.7 points and 2.6 rebounds per game in the German League. In the summer of 2012, he signed a contract with Crvena zvezda. After club legend Igor Rakočević retired from the professional basketball in 2013, Simonović became next team captain. In his first season in the EuroLeague, he averaged 4.8 points and 2.9 rebounds.

In August 2014, he signed with the French team Élan Béarnais Pau-Orthez. On 30 September, French Cup game against Orléans Loiret Basket, Simonović made a buzzer beater three pointer to edge Orléans by 72–70. He led his team in scoring with 27 points, while also having 9 steals, 5 assists and 4 rebounds. On 21 April 2015, he had the best game since coming in the club, scoring season-high 31 points in an 89–96 loss to Limoges CSP. Pau-Orthez finished the season in the French League in 13th place. Over 26 games played, Simonović averaged 13.4 points, and 3 rebounds on 39.6% shooting from the field. He also scored 20 and more points four times during the season.

On 30 September 2015, he signed a short-term contract with Crvena zvezda. On 19 November 2015, he re-signed with the club for the rest of the season. On 10 July 2016, he re-signed with the team until the end of 2017–18 season.

On 4 July 2017, Simonović signed with Russian club Zenit Saint Petersburg. On 14 July 2019, he left the club.

On 18 July 2019, he signed a two-year contract for Slovenian club Cedevita Olimpija. On 13 July 2020, Simonović signed a two-year deal with former team Crvena zvezda. On 15 November 2020, Simonović recorded his 300 apperiences for the Zvezda. He retired as a player with Crvena zvezda in July 2022.

== National team career ==
Simonović was a member of the senior Serbian national basketball team which took silver medal at the 2014 World Cup under head coach Aleksandar Đorđević and after that he was a part of Olympic team that took silver medal at the 19th Olympic Basketball Tournament at the 2016 Summer Olympics under the head coach Aleksandar Đorđević.

He also represented Serbia at the EuroBasket 2015. In the first phase of the tournament, Serbia dominated in the toughest Group B with 5-0 record, and then eliminated Finland and Czech Republic in the round of 16 and quarterfinal game, respectively. However, they were stopped in the semifinal game by Lithuania with 67–64, and eventually lost to the host team France in the bronze-medal game with 81–68. Simonović was mostly used as a three-point and defensive task specialist; he averaged 2.3 points and 2.0 rebounds per game on 30.8% shooting from the three-point line.

Simonović also represented Serbia at the 2016 Summer Olympics where they won the silver medal, after losing to the United States in the final game with 96–66.

At the 2019 FIBA Basketball World Cup, the national team of Serbia was dubbed as favorite to win the trophy, but was eventually upset in the quarterfinals by Argentina. With wins over the United States and Czech Republic, it finished in fifth place. Simonović averaged 3 points and 1.6 rebounds over 7 tournament games. In September 2019, Simonović announced his retirement from the national team.

However, in February 2020, Simonović was invited by new head coach Igor Kokoškov to join the national team during EuroBasket 2021 qualification matches against Finland and Georgia.

== Career statistics ==
Legend
GP	Games played	GS	Games started	MPG	Minutes per game
FG%	Field-goal percentage	3P%	3-point field-goal percentage	FT%	Free-throw percentage
RPG	Rebounds per game	APG	Assists per game	SPG	Steals per game
BPG	Blocks per game	PPG	Points per game	PIR	Performance index rating
**Bold**	Career high

=== EuroLeague ===
Year	Team	GP	GS	MPG	FG%	3P%	FT%	RPG	APG	SPG	BPG	PPG	PIR
2013–14	Crvena zvezda	10	1	19.4	.395	.375	.667	2.9	.6	**.8**	**.2**	4.8	5.8
2015–16	Crvena zvezda	27	**6**	19.9	.457	**.421**	.783	1.9	.3	.5	.1	7.4	5.9
2016–17	Crvena zvezda	**30**	3	**26.7**	**.548**	.390	**.824**	**3.6**	**.7**	**.8**	.1	**12.6**	**11.7**
Career		67	10	22.9	.457	.400	.810	2.8	.5	.7	.1	9.4	8.5

== Coaching career ==
Following his retirement as a player, Crvena zvezda hired Simonović as their new assistant coach and a staff member of Vladimir Jovanović. On 19 November 2022, the club parted ways with his following the Jovanović departure.

On 18 December 2023, SPD Radnički hired Simonović as their new head coach.

== Controversy ==
=== 2014 Serbian League trophy incident ===
On 21 June 2014, Crvena zvezda team captain Simonović was part of a bizarre incident following the Serbian League playoffs final game 4, a hard-fought overtime contest that saw Partizan defeat arch-rivals Red Star Belgrade for a 13th consecutive league title.

The home-court loss came as a bitter pill to the Red Star team, considered by significant sections of the Serbian media and fans as title favorites capable of finally ending Partizan's 12-year domestic league domination. However, Partizan, already up 2-1 in the best-of-five series, led by Bogdan Bogdanović's 36 point performance, managed a memorable overtime away win for its 13th consecutive Serbian title.

Disappointed and embittered over yet another failure to win the Serbian League, members of the Red Star ultra fan group, Delije, decided to disrupt the championship trophy presentation by storming the court, grabbing the displayed trophy, and taking it back with them into the stands among a crowd of fellow ultra fans. Simonović was soon seen entering the said crowd of Red Star fans by climbing into the stands where he proceeded to lift up the seized trophy, an act met with loud approval from the gathered fans who immediately erupted into cheers and fan songs. Many others in the arena expressed visible disapproval, among them seemingly even some Red Star players who turned away and began walking off the court.

Since the trophy was physically damaged in the process, the championship trophy ceremony was eventually held with a smaller replica trophy presented to Partizan players and staff. Simonović later denied trying to offend anyone with his actions, claiming he entered the stands after being asked by the game's delegate to do so and try to return the trophy on the court.

== See also ==
- List of Olympic medalists in basketball
- List of KK Crvena zvezda players with 100 games played

Sporting positions
Preceded by Igor Rakočević	Crvena zvezda captain 2013–2014	Succeeded by Luka Mitrović
