= 2019 FIBA Basketball World Cup qualification (Americas) =

International basketball competition

2019 FIBA Basketball World Cup
Americas Qualification

Tournament details
- Dates: 23 November 2017 – 25 February 2019
- Teams: 16

Official website
- Americas qualifiers website

The 2019 FIBA Basketball World Cup qualification for the FIBA Americas region, began in November 2017 and concluded in February 2019. The process determined the seven teams that would participate at the 2019 FIBA Basketball World Cup.

== Seeding ==
The top five teams from both 2016 Centrobasket and 2016 South American Basketball Championship plus the two teams from North America (Canada and USA) qualified directly for the 2019 FIBA World Cup qualification. Four additional teams were scheduled to participate at a pre-qualifier tournament in July 2017, but it was cancelled. Instead, the sixth- and seventh-placed teams at the Centrobasket and South American Championship were invited to the World Cup qualification.

Pot 1	Pot 2	Pot 3	Pot 4
Argentina; Venezuela	United States; Canada	Uruguay; Colombia	Puerto Rico; Dominican Republic
Pot 5	Pot 6	Pot 7	Pot 8
Panama; Chile	Mexico; Virgin Islands	Paraguay; Brazil (Note: Brazil was suspended by FIBA in November 2016 due to its National Member Federation's failure to meet specific obligations. The suspension was conditionally lifted in June 2017.)	Cuba; Bahamas

== First round ==
All times are local.

=== Group A ===
Pos	Team	Pld	W	L	PF	PA	PD	Pts	Qualification
1	Argentina	6	5	1	519	391	+128	11	Second round
2	Uruguay	6	4	2	432	442	−10	10	Second round
3	Panama	6	3	3	436	445	−9	9	Second round
4	Paraguay	6	0	6	351	460	−109	6	

Source: FIBA
Rules for classification: 1) Points; 2) Head-to-head results; 3) Points difference; 4) Points scored.

23 November 2017	Uruguay	86–73	Panama	Montevideo
20:00	Scoring by quarter: 17–24, 24–22, 31–12, 14–15
	Pts: Batista 21; Rebs: Batista 10; Asts: Barrera 8	Boxscore	Pts: Lloreda 13; Rebs: Bishop 7 Asts: Levy 4	Arena: Palacio Contador Gastón Guelfi; Referees: Guilherme Locatelli (BRA) Daniel Garcia (VEN), Felipe Valenzuela (CHI)

23 November 2017	Argentina	96–63	Paraguay	La Rioja
21:15	Scoring by quarter: 26–16, 18–13, 32–15, 20–19
	Pts: Scola 22; Rebs: Scola 11; Asts: Scola 6	Boxscore	Pts: Peralta 14; Rebs: Bareiro 5 Asts: López 3	Arena: Superdomo; Referees: Marcos Benito (BRA), Andreia Silva (BRA), Felipe Ibarra (CHI)

26 November 2017	Panama	59–68	Argentina	Panama City
16:00	Scoring by quarter: 15–15, 14–17, 15–20, 15–16
	Pts: Bishop 15; Rebs: Bishop 13; Asts: Hicks 4	Boxscore	Pts: Laprovíttola 19; Rebs: Deck 15; Asts: Laprovíttola 3	Arena: Roberto Durán Arena; Referees: Michael Weiland (CAN), Matthew Kallio (CAN), Krishna Domínguez (MEX)

26 November 2017	Uruguay	67–49	Paraguay	Montevideo
20:30	Scoring by quarter: 13–15, 16–11, 17–14, 21–9
	Pts: Parodi 17; Rebs: Calfani 12; Asts: Vidal 5	Boxscore	Pts: Zanotti 19; Rebs: López 7 Asts: Ljubetich 4	Arena: Palacio Contador Gastón Guelfi; Referees: Roberto Oliveros (VEN), Rodrigo Mesa (COL), Fabiano Huber (BRA)

23 February 2018	Panama	82–62	Paraguay	Panama City
20:15	Scoring by quarter: 23–14, 13–13, 16–22, 30–13
	Pts: Hicks 20; Rebs: Mitchell 9 Asts: Gaskins 11	Boxscore	Pts: Araujo 17; Rebs: Araujo 10; Asts: Riveros 3	Arena: Roberto Durán Arena; Referees: Marcos Benito (BRA), Rodrigo Mesa (COL), Felipe Ibarra (CHI)

23 February 2018	Argentina	83–88	Uruguay	Olavarría
21:00	Scoring by quarter: 27–16, 15–20, 20–25, 21–27
	Pts: Brussino, Scola 23; Rebs: Delía, Scola 9 Asts: Laprovíttola 9	Boxscore	Pts: Batista 17; Rebs: Batista 8 Asts: Parodi 6	Arena: Parque Carlos Guerrero; Referees: Guilherme Locatelli (BRA), Krishna Domínguez (MEX), Fabiano Huber (BRA)

26 February 2018	Panama	86–75	Uruguay	Panama City
20:45	Scoring by quarter: 23–25, 21–10, 23–12, 19–28
	Pts: Gaskins 19; Rebs: Carter 8 Asts: Gaskins 9	Boxscore	Pts: Batista 22; Rebs: Batista 18; Asts: Barrera 3	Arena: Roberto Durán Arena; Referees: Cristiano Maranho (BRA), Michael Weiland (CAN), Andreia Silva (BRA)

26 February 2018	Paraguay	61–83	Argentina	Olavarría, Argentina
21:00	Scoring by quarter: 19–25, 14–15, 13–26, 15–17
	Pts: Zanotti 17; Rebs: López 6 Asts: Ljubetich 3	Boxscore	Pts: Redivo 14; Rebs: Delía 10; Asts: Laprovíttola 5	Arena: Parque Carlos Guerrero; Attendance: 3,500; Referees: Roberto Oliveros (VEN), Daniel García (VEN), Carlos Peralta (ECU)

28 June 2018	Argentina	87–62	Panama	San Juan
21:00	Scoring by quarter: 19–14, 19–13, 24–18, 25–17
	Pts: Garino 20; Rebs: Delía 9 Asts: Campazzo 12	Boxscore	Pts: Gaskins 19; Rebs: Carter 9 Asts: Gaskins 2	Arena: Estadio Aldo Cantoni; Referees: Cristiano Maranho (BRA), Sebastián Negrón (CHI), Rodrigo Mejía (COL)

28 June 2018	Paraguay	49–58	Uruguay	Asunción
21:30	Scoring by quarter: 17–17, 11–18, 14–12, 7–11
	Pts: Peralta 17; Rebs: Bareiro 8 Asts: five players 1	Boxscore	Pts: Fitipaldo 13; Rebs: Vidal 7 Asts: Fitipaldo, Parodi 3	Arena: Estadio Deportivo San José; Referees: Marcos Benito (BRA), Andreia Silva (BRA), José Melgarejo (COL)

1 July 2018	Uruguay	58–102	Argentina	Montevideo
20:00	Scoring by quarter: 14–33, 16–25, 21–22, 7–22
	Pts: Parodi 19; Rebs: Passos 9 Asts: Fitipaldo, Parodi 4	Boxscore	Pts: Scola 29; Rebs: Scola 11; Asts: Campazzo 7	Arena: Palacio Contador Gastón Guelfi; Referees: Guilherme Locatelli (BRA), Michael Weiland (CAN), Fernando Serpa de Oliveira (BRA)

1 July 2018	Paraguay	67–74	Panama	Asunción
21:15	Scoring by quarter: 20–19, 12–17, 20–15, 15–23
	Pts: Peralta 17; Rebs: Araujo 7 Asts: Vallejos 6	Boxscore	Pts: Hicks 13; Rebs: Carter 8 Asts: Gaskins, Mitchell 5	Arena: Estadio Deportivo San José; Referees: Roberto Vázquez (PUR), Roberto Oliveros (VEN), Americo Rodríguez (VEN)

=== Group B ===
Pos	Team	Pld	W	L	PF	PA	PD	Pts	Qualification
1	Venezuela	6	5	1	437	368	+69	11 (Note: Venezuela 1–1, +4 PD; Brazil 1–1, –4 PD)	Second round
2	Brazil	6	5	1	479	383	+96	11	Second round
3	Chile	6	1	5	379	456	−77	7 (Note: Chile 1–1, +1 PD; Colombia 1–1, –1 PD)	Second round
4	Colombia	6	1	5	393	481	−88	7	

Source: FIBA
Rules for classification: 1) Points; 2) Head-to-head results; 3) Points difference; 4) Points scored.
Notes:

24 November 2017	Venezuela	85–71	Colombia	Barquisimeto
20:15	Scoring by quarter: 18–17, 20–16, 28–23, 19–15
	Pts: Colmenares 23; Rebs: Colmenares 9 Asts: Jo. Vargas 7	Boxscore	Pts: Atencia 22; Rebs: Jackson 12; Asts: Moreno 5	Arena: Domo Bolivariano; Referees: Alejandro Sánchez (URU), Juan Fernández (ARG), Gonzalo Salgueiro (URU)

24 November 2017	Chile	73–86	Brazil	Osorno
21:00	Scoring by quarter: 12–15, 16–22, 19–25, 26–24
	Pts: Herrera 15; Rebs: Herrera, Marechal 4 Asts: Carrasco, Marechal 3	Boxscore	Pts: Garcia 14; Rebs: Varejão 9 Asts: Dos Santos, Fischer 6	Arena: Monumental Maria Gallardo; Attendance: 3,000; Referees: Omar Bermúdez (MEX), Jorge Vázquez (PUR), Andrés Bartel (URU)

27 November 2017	Colombia	69–74	Chile	Medellín
20:00	Scoring by quarter: 11–21, 13–12, 24–23, 21–18
	Pts: Atencia 17; Rebs: Moreno 7 Asts: Moreno 5	Boxscore	Pts: Suárez 20; Rebs: Reyes 11; Asts: Carrasco 7	Arena: Coliseo Iván de Bedout; Referees: Leandro Lezcano (ARG), Jesed Díaz (PUR), Carlos Peralta (ECU)

27 November 2017	Brazil	72–60	Venezuela	Rio de Janeiro
20:30	Scoring by quarter: 19–7, 20–13, 19–26, 14–14
	Pts: Varejão 16; Rebs: Varejão 12; Asts: Garcia 7	Boxscore	Pts: Mijares 16; Rebs: Colmenares 9 Asts: Mijares 3	Arena: Carioca Arena 1 Referees: Roberto Vázquez (PUR), Fabricio Vito (ARG), Julio Anaya (PAN)

22 February 2018	Brazil	84–49	Colombia	Goiânia
19:00	Scoring by quarter: 21–24, 12–6, 25–15, 26–4
	Pts: Barbosa 18; Rebs: Varejão 13; Asts: Varejão 8	Boxscore	Pts: Jackson 16; Rebs: Ortiz 5 Asts: Moreno 3	Arena: Goiânia Arena; Attendance: 2,949; Referees: Fabricio Vito (ARG), Leonardo Zalazar (ARG), Gonzalo Salgueiro (URU)

22 February 2018	Venezuela	77–56	Chile	Barquisimeto
20:15	Scoring by quarter: 23–11, 13–16, 23–14, 18–15
	Pts: Guillént 14; Rebs: Echenique, Graterol 7 Asts: G. Vargas 7	Boxscore	Pts: Isla 16; Rebs: three players 4 Asts: Del Solar, Marechal 2	Arena: Domo Bolivariano; Referees: Alejandro Sánchez (URU), Leandro Lezcano (ARG), Juan Fernández (ARG)

25 February 2018	Brazil	83–58	Chile	Goiânia
20:00	Scoring by quarter: 15–18, 21–14, 26–18, 21–8
	Pts: Dias 15; Rebs: Varejão 10; Asts: Benite, Fischer 4	Boxscore	Pts: Suárez 16; Rebs: Fontena 5 Asts: Marechal, Morales 2	Arena: Goiânia Arena; Attendance: 10,550; Referees: Roberto Vázquez (PUR), Julio Anaya (PAN), Andrés Bartel (URU)

25 February 2018	Colombia	62–73	Venezuela	Medellín
20:15	Scoring by quarter: 17–21, 9–16, 13–14, 23–22
	Pts: Jackson 22; Rebs: Hernández 11; Asts: four players 2	Boxscore	Pts: Chourio, Colmenares 13; Rebs: Colmenares 15; Asts: Guillént 9	Arena: Coliseo Iván de Bedout; Referees: Jorge Vázquez (PUR), Jesed Díaz (PUR), Omar Bermúdez (MEX)

29 June 2018	Venezuela	72–56	Brazil	Caracas
19:00	Scoring by quarter: 17–13, 21–11, 17–10, 17–22
	Pts: Jo. Vargas 16; Rebs: Colmenares 11; Asts: Guillént 7	Boxscore	Pts: Varejão 16; Rebs: Meindl 10; Asts: Huertas 5	Arena: Poliedro de Caracas; Referees: Fabricio Vito (ARG), Leandro Lezcano (ARG), Omar Bermúdez (MEX)

29 June 2018	Chile	67–71	Colombia	Valdivia
21:15	Scoring by quarter: 15–19, 16–14, 21–21, 15–17
	Pts: Suárez 20; Rebs: Haase, Reyes 5 Asts: Carrasco 6	Boxscore	Pts: Atencia 21; Rebs: Jackson 11; Asts: Atencia 8	Arena: Coliseo Municipal Antonio Azurmendy Riveros; Attendance: 4,000; Referees: Anthony Jordan (USA), Alejandro Sánchez (URU), Julio Anaya (PAN)

2 July 2018	Colombia	71–98	Brazil	Medellín
16:00	Scoring by quarter: 14–21, 20–25, 14–31, 23–22
	Pts: Ortiz 14; Rebs: Almanza 5 Asts: Atencia 4	Boxscore	Pts: Benite 28; Rebs: Machado 7 Asts: Huertas, Varejão 3	Arena: Coliseo Iván de Bedout; Referees: Jorge Vázquez (PUR), Steven Anderson (USA), Christian Wilmore (BAH)

2 July 2018	Chile	51–70	Venezuela	Valdivia
20:30	Scoring by quarter: 18–22, 16–21, 5–12, 12–15
	Pts: Haase 12; Rebs: Carrión 6 Asts: six players 2	Boxscore	Pts: Echenique 19; Rebs: Bethelmy, Vargas 8 Asts: Vargas 6	Arena: Coliseo Municipal Antonio Azurmendy Riveros; Referees: Jesed Díaz (PUR), Andrés Bartel (URU), Krishna Domínguez (MEX)

=== Group C ===
Pos	Team	Pld	W	L	PF	PA	PD	Pts	Qualification
1	United States	6	5	1	506	396	+110	11	Second round
2	Puerto Rico	6	4	2	516	479	+37	10	Second round
3	Mexico	6	3	3	439	463	−24	9	Second round
4	Cuba	6	0	6	380	503	−123	6	

Source: FIBA
Rules for classification: 1) Points; 2) Head-to-head results; 3) Points difference; 4) Points scored.

23 November 2017	Puerto Rico	78–85	United States	Orlando, United States
19:30	Scoring by quarter: 23–17, 16–21, 19–23, 20–24
	Pts: Vassallo 16; Rebs: Huertas, Sánchez 5 Asts: Rodríguez 8	Boxscore	Pts: Hearn, Warney 17; Rebs: Warney 11; Asts: Christon, Munford 4	Arena: CFE Arena; Attendance: 4,200; Referees: Michael Weiland (CAN), Leandro Lezcano (ARG), Julio Anaya (PAN)
Note: Due to Hurricane Maria, the game was moved from Puerto Rico.

23 November 2017	Mexico	72–66	Cuba	León
21:00	Scoring by quarter: 16–17, 16–19, 22–14, 18–16
	Pts: Hernández 23; Rebs: Toscano 11; Asts: Stoll 8	Boxscore	Pts: Justiz 25; Rebs: Justiz 19; Asts: Guzmán 6	Arena: Domo de la Feria; Referees: Cristiano Maranho (BRA), Roberto Oliveros (VEN), Matthew Leigh Kallio (CAN)

26 November 2017	United States	91–55	Mexico	Greensboro
17:00	Scoring by quarter: 25–12, 15–17, 32–18, 19–8
	Pts: four players 14; Rebs: Wear 10; Asts: Sloan 7	Boxscore	Pts: Ramos 12; Rebs: Hernández, Ramos 7 Asts: Stoll 4	Arena: Greensboro Fieldhouse; Attendance: 3,000; Referees: Guilherme Locatelli (BRA), Alejandro Sánchez (URU), Americo Rodríguez (VEN)

26 November 2017	Cuba	72–95	Puerto Rico	Havana
20:00	Scoring by quarter: 20–32, 9–19, 23–25, 20–19
	Pts: Rivero 23; Rebs: Justiz 15; Asts: Justiz, Roque 3	Boxscore	Pts: Clemente 15; Rebs: Andújar, Collier 6 Asts: Díaz 4	Arena: Coliseo de la Ciudad Deportiva; Referees: Marcos Benito (BRA), Andreia Silva (BRA), Leonardo Zalazar (ARG)

23 February 2018	Mexico	80–100	Puerto Rico	Monterrey
20:00	Scoring by quarter: 15–30, 24–19, 17–20, 24–31
	Pts: Cruz 31; Rebs: Cruz 7 Asts: Stoll 6	Boxscore	Pts: Browne 21; Rebs: Browne 8 Asts: Andújar 6	Arena: Gimnasio Nuevo León Unido; Referees: Cristiano Maranho (BRA), Roberto Oliveros (VEN), Daniel García (VEN)

23 February 2018	United States	84–48	Cuba	Santa Cruz
20:00	Scoring by quarter: 21–8, 20–16, 21–12, 22–12
	Pts: Purvis 14; Rebs: Williams 12; Asts: Williams 6	Boxscore	Pts: Mensía 11; Rebs: Justiz 10; Asts: Guzmán, Martínez 3	Arena: Kaiser Permanente Arena; Attendance: 2,033; Referees: Michael Weiland (CAN), Andreia Silva (BRA), Carlos Peralta (ECU)

26 February 2018	Cuba	52–75	Mexico	Havana
20:00	Scoring by quarter: 12–26, 16–9, 9–15, 15–25
	Pts: Rivero 18; Rebs: Justiz 14; Asts: Oliva 3	Boxscore	Pts: Pérez 23; Rebs: Hernández 12; Asts: Stoll 4	Arena: Coliseo de la Ciudad Deportiva; Referees: Marcos Benito (BRA), Fabiano Huber (BRA), Felipe Ibarra (CHI)

26 February 2018	United States	83–75	Puerto Rico	Santa Cruz
20:00	Scoring by quarter: 20–13, 27–17, 19–22, 17–23
	Pts: Harrison 16; Rebs: Williams 11; Asts: Drew II 7	Boxscore	Pts: Clavell 23; Rebs: Andújar 7 Asts: Browne, Rodríguez 5	Arena: Kaiser Permanente Arena; Attendance: 1,984; Referees: Guilherme Locatelli (BRA), Alejandro Sánchez (URU), Christian Wilmore (BAH)

28 June 2018	Puerto Rico	84–80	Cuba	San Juan
20:00	Scoring by quarter: 21–18, 14–24, 24–18, 25–20
	Pts: Huertas 18; Rebs: Díaz 9 Asts: four players 3	Boxscore	Pts: Rivero 31; Rebs: Rivero 11; Asts: Molina, Oliva 3	Arena: Roberto Clemente Coliseum; Referees: Michael Weiland (CAN), Andrés Bartel (URU), Christian Wilmore (BAH)

28 June 2018	Mexico	78–70	United States	Mexico City
20:30	Scoring by quarter: 31–10, 14–18, 10–23, 23–19
	Pts: Cruz 24; Rebs: Ayón 9 Asts: Ayón 7	Boxscore	Pts: Thornton 14; Rebs: Jones 6 Asts: Munford 5	Arena: Gimnasio Olímpico Juan de la Barrera; Referees: Guilherme Locatelli (BRA), Matthew Kallio (CAN), Michael Scott (CAN)

1 July 2018	Cuba	62–93	United States	Havana
16:00	Scoring by quarter: 28–24, 9–26, 9–24, 16–19
	Pts: Guzmán 16; Rebs: Justiz 9 Asts: Rivero 3	Boxscore	Pts: Hearn, Munford 16; Rebs: four players 5 Asts: McKinney-Jones, Munford 4	Arena: Coliseo de la Ciudad Deportiva; Referees: Cristiano Maranho (BRA), Sebastián Negrón (CHI), Fabricio Vito (ARG)

1 July 2018	Puerto Rico	84–79	Mexico	San Juan
19:00	Scoring by quarter: 25–18, 19–21, 18–22, 22–18
	Pts: Clavell, Huertas 17; Rebs: Díaz 8 Asts: Barea 11	Boxscore	Pts: Cruz 22; Rebs: Ayón 15; Asts: Ayón 6	Arena: Roberto Clemente Coliseum; Attendance: 8,800; Referees: Marcos Benito (BRA), Andreia Silva (BRA), Norval Young (IVB)

=== Group D ===
Pos	Team	Pld	W	L	PF	PA	PD	Pts	Qualification
1	Canada	6	5	1	596	443	+153	11	Second round
2	Dominican Republic	6	4	2	539	493	+46	10	Second round
3	Virgin Islands	6	2	4	509	588	−79	8	Second round
4	Bahamas	6	1	5	441	561	−120	7	

Source: FIBA
Rules for classification: 1) Points; 2) Head-to-head results; 3) Points difference; 4) Points scored.

24 November 2017	Dominican Republic	99–89	Virgin Islands	Santiago de los Caballeros
20:00	Scoring by quarter: 29–27, 20–14, 21–30, 29–18
	Pts: Vargas 19; Rebs: Vargas 11; Asts: Báez 7	Boxscore	Pts: Samuel 25; Rebs: Samuel 7 Asts: Hodge 7	Arena: Gran Arena del Cibao; Attendance: 2,510; Referees: Fabricio Vito (ARG), Leonardo Zalazar (ARG), Jose Melgarejo (COL)

24 November 2017	Canada	93–69	Bahamas	Halifax
20:15	Scoring by quarter: 21–11, 24–6, 21–21, 27–31
	Pts: Heslip 22; Rebs: P. Scrubb 7 Asts: P. Scrubb 6	Boxscore	Pts: Burrows 15; Rebs: Rose 7 Asts: Rose 8	Arena: Scotiabank Centre; Attendance: 6,300; Referees: Roberto Vázquez (PUR), Jesed Díaz (PUR), Sebastián Negrón (CHI)

27 November 2017	Bahamas	85–93	Virgin Islands	Nassau
20:00	Scoring by quarter: 16–21, 25–25, 22–21, 22–26
	Pts: Burrows, Cleare 18; Rebs: Burrows, Cleare 8 Asts: Rose 10	Boxscore	Pts: Samuel 26; Rebs: L. Smith 9 Asts: Hodge 7	Arena: Sir Kendal Isaacs Gymnasium; Referees: Jorge Vázquez (PUR), Omar Bermúdez (MEX), Norval Young (IVB)

27 November 2017	Dominican Republic	88–76	Canada	Santiago de los Caballeros
20:00	Scoring by quarter: 19–16, 25–14, 18–16, 26–30
	Pts: Mendoza 25; Rebs: Rojas 7 Asts: Peña 4	Boxscore	Pts: P. Scrubb 22; Rebs: P. Scrubb, T. Scrubb 7 Asts: P. Scrubb 4	Arena: Gran Arena del Cibao; Attendance: 2,035; Referees: Marcos Benito (BRA), Daniel García (VEN), Andrés Bartel (URU)

22 February 2018	Virgin Islands	89–118	Canada	Nassau, Bahamas
16:30	Scoring by quarter: 27–21, 21–32, 22–34, 19–31
	Pts: Edwin 23; Rebs: Samuel 5 Asts: Milligan 3	Boxscore	Pts: Ejim 28; Rebs: Ejim 8 Asts: Pierre 6	Arena: Sir Kendal Isaacs Gymnasium; Attendance: 50; Referees: Jorge Vázquez (PUR), Jesed Díaz (PUR), Omar Bermúdez (MEX)

22 February 2018	Bahamas	63–96	Dominican Republic	Nassau
20:00	Scoring by quarter: 15–13, 19–22, 19–35, 10–26
	Pts: Burrows, Carey 11; Rebs: Nesbitt 7 Asts: Burrows 5	Boxscore	Pts: Liz 19; Rebs: Montero 8 Asts: five players 3	Arena: Sir Kendal Isaacs Gymnasium; Attendance: 250; Referees: Roberto Vázquez (PUR), Julio Anaya (PAN), Andrés Bartel (URU)

25 February 2018	Virgin Islands	85–113	Dominican Republic	Nassau, Bahamas
16:30	Scoring by quarter: 24–27, 16–27, 17–26, 28–33
	Pts: Hodge 19; Rebs: Edwin, Hodge 8 Asts: Hodge 8	Boxscore	Pts: Santana 20; Rebs: Montero 12; Asts: Montero 7	Arena: Sir Kendal Isaacs Gymnasium; Referees: Fabricio Vito (ARG), Leonardo Zalazar (ARG), Sebastián Negrón (CHI)

25 February 2018	Bahamas	67–113	Canada	Nassau
20:00	Scoring by quarter: 21–26, 8–25, 22–26, 16–37
	Pts: Burrows 17; Rebs: Burrows, Hinds 5 Asts: Carey, Hinds 4	Boxscore	Pts: Heslip 19; Rebs: Landry 8 Asts: Scrubb 6	Arena: Sir Kendal Isaacs Gymnasium; Attendance: 150; Referees: Leandro Lezcano (ARG), José Melgarejo (COL), Felipe Valenzuela (CHI)

28 June 2018	Virgin Islands	84–74	Bahamas	San Juan, Puerto Rico
17:00	Scoring by quarter: 21–18, 19–23, 19–16, 25–17
	Pts: Hodge 22; Rebs: Claxton 7 Asts: Hodge 5	Boxscore	Pts: Hield 23; Rebs: Hield 13; Asts: Hield 6	Arena: Roberto Clemente Coliseum; Referees: Roberto Vázquez (PUR), Jesed Diaz (PUR), Norval Young (ISV)

29 June 2018	Canada	97–61	Dominican Republic	Toronto
19:30	Scoring by quarter: 25–21, 20–12, 20–21, 32–7
	Pts: four players 14; Rebs: Olynyk 9 Asts: Joseph 8	Boxscore	Pts: Mendoza 11; Rebs: Mendoza, Vargas 8 Asts: Mendoza 3	Arena: Ricoh Coliseum; Referees: Jorge Vázquez (PUR), Steven Anderson (USA), Krishna Domínguez (MEX)

2 July 2018	Canada	99–69	Virgin Islands	Ottawa
13:30	Scoring by quarter: 20–16, 26–18, 31–16, 22–19
	Pts: Olynyk 14; Rebs: Ejim 7 Asts: Joseph, Nembhard 6	Boxscore	Pts: Williams 12; Rebs: Claxton 6 Asts: Rivera 7	Arena: TD Place Arena; Referees: Leandro Lezcano (ARG), Omar Bermúdez (MEX), Grant Todey (USA)

2 July 2018	Dominican Republic	82–83	Bahamas	Santo Domingo
20:00	Scoring by quarter: 14–18, 18–18, 24–25, 26–22
	Pts: Liz 23; Rebs: Camacho 7 Asts: Solano 3	Boxscore	Pts: Hield, Munnings 19; Rebs: Burrows 10; Asts: Carey 7	Arena: Palacio de los Deportes Virgilio Travieso Soto; Attendance: 5,000; Referees: Anthony Jordan (USA), Julio Anaya (PAN), Jorge Cabrera (CUB)

== Second round ==
In the second round, the top three teams from each group were placed in a group with three other top teams. All results from the first qualification round were carried over to the second round. Games were played in September 2018, November 2018 and February 2019. The top three teams in each group along with the better placed fourth team qualified for the FIBA Basketball World Cup.

=== Group E ===
Pos	Team	Pld	W	L	PF	PA	PD	Pts	Qualification
1	United States	12	10	2	1034	814	+220	22	2019 FIBA Basketball World Cup
2	Argentina	12	9	3	1037	854	+183	21	2019 FIBA Basketball World Cup
3	Puerto Rico	12	8	4	967	939	+28	20	2019 FIBA Basketball World Cup
4	Uruguay	12	6	6	824	909	−85	18	
5	Mexico	12	5	7	875	903	−28	17	
6	Panama	12	4	8	844	930	−86	16	

Source: FIBA
Rules for classification: 1) Points; 2) Head-to-head results; 3) Points difference; 4) Points scored.

14 September 2018	Puerto Rico	82–73	Panama	San Juan
19:30	Scoring by quarter: 20–16, 15–14, 19–19, 28–24
	Pts: Barea 18; Rebs: Díaz 9 Asts: Barea 7	Boxscore	Pts: Girón 17; Rebs: Bishop 8 Asts: Bishop, Gaskins 3	Arena: Roberto Clemente Coliseum; Attendance: 8,500; Referees: Marcos Benito (BRA), Michael Weiland (CAN), Nathaniel Saunders (CAN)

14 September 2018	Mexico	74–78	Argentina	Mexico City
20:30	Scoring by quarter: 15–26, 17–14, 22–14, 20–24
	Pts: Ayón 18; Rebs: Ayón 12; Asts: Méndez-Valdez, Stoll 5	Boxscore	Pts: Campazzo 26; Rebs: Delía, Scola 9 Asts: Campazzo 8	Arena: Gimnasio Olímpico Juan de la Barrera; Referees: Guilherme Locatelli (BRA), Andreia Silva (BRA), Daniel García (VEN)

14 September 2018	United States	114–57	Uruguay	Paradise
19:00	Scoring by quarter: 28–8, 28–16, 28–16, 30–17
	Pts: Mason III 16; Rebs: Ellenson 9 Asts: Mason III 8	Boxscore	Pts: Rodríguez 11; Rebs: García 6 Asts: García 5	Arena: Cox Pavilion; Referees: Cristiano Maranho (BRA), Matthew Kallio (CAN), Carlos Peralta (ECU)

17 September 2018	Uruguay	63–60	Mexico	Montevideo
19:15	Scoring by quarter: 9–19, 20–16, 13–12, 21–13
	Pts: Batista 18; Rebs: Passos 9 Asts: Parodi 5	Boxscore	Pts: Ayón 21; Rebs: Ayón 8 Asts: Stoll 6	Arena: Palacio Contador Gastón Guelfi; Referees: Marcos Benito (BRA), Michael Weiland (CAN), Sebastián Negrón (CHI)

17 September 2018	Argentina	106–84	Puerto Rico	Formosa
21:15	Scoring by quarter: 20–18, 36–19, 32–21, 18–26
	Pts: Deck, Laprovíttola 21; Rebs: Deck 11; Asts: Brussino, Laprovíttola 5	Boxscore	Pts: Barea 24; Rebs: Sánchez 5 Asts: Barea 5	Arena: Estadio Cincuentenario; Referees: Cristiano Maranho (BRA), Matthew Kallio (CAN), Carlos Peralta (ECU)

17 September 2018	Panama	48–78	United States	Panama City
20:00	Scoring by quarter: 7–18, 16–18, 15–21, 10–21
	Pts: Carter 16; Rebs: Bishop, Mitchell 7 Asts: four players 2	Boxscore	Pts: Hearn 12; Rebs: Ellenson 11; Asts: Trice, White 4	Arena: Roberto Durán Arena; Referees: Guilherme Locatelli (BRA), Felipe Ibarra (CHI), Rodrigo Mejía (COL)

29 November 2018	Uruguay	64–62	Puerto Rico	Montevideo
20:30	Scoring by quarter: 15–11, 17–20, 17–11, 15–20
	Pts: Batista 19; Rebs: Batista 9 Asts: Barrera 7	Boxscore	Pts: Huertas 36; Rebs: Browne 8 Asts: Browne, Franklin 2	Arena: Antel Arena; Referees: Cristiano Maranho (BRA), Daniel García (VEN), Nathaniel Saunders (CAN)

29 November 2018	Argentina	80–63	United States	La Rioja
21:30	Scoring by quarter: 13–16, 22–16, 23–8, 22–23
	Pts: Laprovíttola 17; Rebs: Scola 9 Asts: Laprovíttola 8	Boxscore	Pts: Trice 16; Rebs: Zeller 12; Asts: Trice 4	Arena: Superdomo; Attendance: 10,000; Referees: Marcos Benito (BRA), Michael Weiland (CAN), Carlos Peralta (ECU)

29 November 2018	Panama	76–65	Mexico	Panama City
20:30	Scoring by quarter: 21–15, 17–13, 21–26, 17–11
	Pts: Carter 18; Rebs: Oglivie 10; Asts: Bishop, Gaskins 4	Boxscore	Pts: A. Pérez 18; Rebs: A. Pérez, Toscano 6 Asts: A. Pérez, Toscano 3	Arena: Roberto Durán Arena; Attendance: 1,500; Referees: Andreia Silva (BRA), Matthew Kallio (CAN), Felipe Valenzuela (CHI)

2 December 2018	Panama	70–71	Puerto Rico	Panama City
17:00	Scoring by quarter: 20–15, 15–13, 16–26, 19–17
	Pts: Hicks 12; Rebs: Mitchell 6 Asts: Carter, Gaskins 6	Boxscore	Pts: Franklin 14; Rebs: Díaz 8 Asts: Browne, Sánchez 3	Arena: Roberto Durán Arena; Attendance: 3,000; Referees: Marcos Benito (BRA), Michael Weiland (CAN), Carlos Peralta (ECU)

2 December 2018	Uruguay	70–78	United States	Montevideo
20:00	Scoring by quarter: 17–22, 23–17, 14–11, 16–28
	Pts: Fitipaldo 17; Rebs: Batista, Parodi 7 Asts: Parodi, Vidal 5	Boxscore	Pts: Trice 17; Rebs: Moreland 13; Asts: Trice 4	Arena: Antel Arena; Referees: Andreia Silva (BRA), Matthew Kallio (CAN), Felipe Valenzuela (CHI)

2 December 2018	Argentina	85–71	Mexico	La Rioja
21:30	Scoring by quarter: 24–15, 15–15, 32–13, 14–28
	Pts: Scola 22; Rebs: Scola 9 Asts: Brussino 5	Boxscore	Pts: Girón 20; Rebs: six players 4 Asts: A. Pérez 9	Arena: Superdomo; Referees: Cristiano Maranho (BRA), Daniel García (VEN), Nathaniel Saunders (CAN)

22 February 2019	United States	111–80	Panama	Greensboro
19:00	Scoring by quarter: 22–21, 31–25, 27–18, 31–16
	Pts: Reynolds 26; Rebs: Frazier II, Onuaku 8 Asts: Trice 10	Boxscore	Pts: Carter 18; Rebs: Carter 7 Asts: Gaskins 7	Arena: Greensboro Fieldhouse; Attendance: 1,272; Referees: Michael Weiland (CAN), Americo Rodríguez (VEN), Sebastián Negrón (CHI)

22 February 2019	Puerto Rico	87–86(OT)	Argentina	San Juan
20:00	Scoring by quarter: 19–14, 14–15, 28–24, 21–29, Overtime: 5–4
	Pts: Clavell 21; Rebs: Díaz 7 Asts: Browne 4	Boxscore	Pts: Brussino, Redivo 16; Rebs: three players 7 Asts: Brussino 7	Arena: Roberto Clemente Coliseum; Attendance: 8,900; Referees: Matthew Kallio (CAN), Michael Scott (CAN), Felipe Ibarra (CHI)

22 February 2019	Mexico	88–77	Uruguay	León
20:30	Scoring by quarter: 19–16, 23–18, 18–13, 28–30
	Pts: Martínez 23; Rebs: Benítez 8 Asts: Álvarez 7	Boxscore	Pts: Parodi 18; Rebs: Wachsmann 7 Asts: Barrera 5	Arena: Domo de la Feria; Referees: Roberto Oliveros (VEN), Rodrigo Mejía (COL), Felipe Valenzuela (CHI)

25 February 2019	United States	84–83	Argentina	Greensboro
19:00	Scoring by quarter: 22–14, 20–21, 17–30, 25–18
	Pts: Frazier II 23; Rebs: Adams 6 Asts: Trice 6	Boxscore	Pts: Redivo 18; Rebs: Brussino 6 Asts: Faggiano 9	Arena: Greensboro Fieldhouse; Attendance: 1,221; Referees: Cristiano Maranho (BRA), Carlos Peralta (ECU), Christian Wilmore (BAH)

25 February 2019	Puerto Rico	65–61	Uruguay	San Juan
20:30	Scoring by quarter: 9–19, 23–7, 14–15, 19–20
	Pts: Browne 16; Rebs: Clemente, López 6 Asts: Sánchez 3	Boxscore	Pts: Batista 19; Rebs: Calfani 10; Asts: Fitipaldo 3	Arena: Roberto Clemente Coliseum; Attendance: 9,000; Referees: Michael Weiland (CAN), Marcos Benito (BRA), Américo Rodríguez (VEN)

25 February 2019	Mexico	78–61	Panama	Monterrey
20:30	Scoring by quarter: 19–12, 22–19, 25–26, 12–4
	Pts: Martínez 17; Rebs: Martínez 11; Asts: Álvarez 7	Boxscore	Pts: Gaskins 13; Rebs: Levy 6 Asts: Levy, Luzcando 4	Arena: Gimnasio Nuevo León Unido; Referees: Norval Alfanscio Young (IVB), Andreia Silva (BRA), José Melgarejo (COL)

=== Group F ===
Pos	Team	Pld	W	L	PF	PA	PD	Pts	Qualification
1	Canada	12	10	2	1115	833	+282	22	2019 FIBA Basketball World Cup
2	Venezuela	12	9	3	886	838	+48	21 (Note: Venezuela 1–1, +4 PD; Brazil 1–1, –4 PD)	2019 FIBA Basketball World Cup
3	Brazil	12	9	3	918	787	+131	21	2019 FIBA Basketball World Cup
4	Dominican Republic	12	7	5	979	921	+58	19	2019 FIBA Basketball World Cup
5	Chile	12	2	10	737	897	−160	14 (Note: Chile 1–1, +16 PD; Virgin Islands 1–1, –16 PD)	
6	Virgin Islands (Note: The Virgin Islands do not receive a point for the forfeit loss to Brazil)	12	3	9	865	1016	−151	14	

Source: FIBA
Rules for classification: 1) Points; 2) Head-to-head results; 3) Points difference; 4) Points scored.
Notes:

13 September 2018	Venezuela	87–73	Virgin Islands	Caracas
18:30	Scoring by quarter: 22–11, 15–17, 25–14, 25–31
	Pts: Zamora 14; Rebs: Ruiz 13; Asts: G. Vargas 9	Boxscore	Pts: Milligan 26; Rebs: L. Smith 12; Asts: Hodge, Rivera 3	Arena: Gimnasio José Joaquín Papá Carrillo; Referees: Alejandro Sánchez (URU), Leonardo Zalazar (ARG), José Melgarejo (COL)

13 September 2018	Canada	85–77	Brazil	Laval
19:30	Scoring by quarter: 22–19, 19–14, 23–23, 21–21
	Pts: Olynyk 20; Rebs: Olynyk 19; Asts: Joseph 10	Boxscore	Pts: Barbosa 18; Rebs: Lima 10; Asts: Huertas 12	Arena: Place Bell; Referees: Jorge Vázquez (PUR), Steven Anderson (USA), Omar Bermúdez (MEX)

13 September 2018	Dominican Republic	71–46	Chile	Santo Domingo
20:30	Scoring by quarter: 13–8, 15–16, 20–13, 23–9
	Pts: Liz 17; Rebs: Delgado 12; Asts: Báez, Suero 4	Boxscore	Pts: S. Suárez 12; Rebs: Herrera, M. Suárez 6 Asts: five players 2	Arena: Palacio de los Deportes Virgilio Travieso Soto; Referees: Roberto Vázquez (PUR), Anthony Jordan (USA), Julio Anaya (PAN)

16 September 2018	Venezuela	79–78(OT)	Dominican Republic	Valencia
17:00	Scoring by quarter: 15–16, 18–22, 16–12, 19–18, Overtime: 11–10
	Pts: Jo. Vargas 21; Rebs: Ruiz 11; Asts: Guillént 6	Boxscore	Pts: Liz 25; Rebs: Delgado 10; Asts: Báez 2	Arena: Forum de Valencia; Referees: Fabricio Vito (ARG), Juan Fernández (ARG), Krishna Domínguez (MEX)

16 September 2018	Brazil	20–0 (forfeit)	Virgin Islands	Goiânia
19:00
		Boxscore		Arena: Goiânia Arena; Referees: Roberto Vázquez (PUR), Gonzalo Salgueiro (URU), Grant Todey (USA)
Note: The Virgin Islands did not arrive timely to play against Brazil and the game was forfeited.

17 September 2018	Chile	61–84	Canada	Valdivia
20:00	Scoring by quarter: 16–23, 14–20, 16–23, 15–18
	Pts: Morales 17; Rebs: Carrión 7 Asts: Morales 5	Boxscore	Pts: Anthony 17; Rebs: Ejim 7 Asts: Notice 7	Arena: Coliseo Municipal Antonio Azurmendy Riveros; Referees: Alejandro Sánchez (URU), Leonardo Zalazar (ARG), Jesed Díaz (PUR)

30 November 2018	Brazil	100–82	Dominican Republic	São Paulo
19:15	Scoring by quarter: 24–16, 34–23, 24–22, 18–21
	Pts: Barbosa 20; Rebs: Lima, Varejão 9 Asts: Barbosa, Luz 4	Boxscore	Pts: Liz 15; Rebs: Araújo 6 Asts: Mendoza 5	Arena: Ginásio Poliesportivo Wlamir Marques; Referees: Roberto Vázquez (PUR), Fabricio Vito (ARG), Julio Anaya (PAN)

30 November 2018	Venezuela	84–76	Canada	Caracas
18:15	Scoring by quarter: 17–17, 20–20, 22–18, 25–21
	Pts: Jo. Vargas 15; Rebs: Echenique 12; Asts: Guillént 8	Boxscore	Pts: Wiltjer 21; Rebs: Anthony 10; Asts: Notice 5	Arena: Parque del Este; Referees: Leandro Lezcano (ARG), Leonardo Zalazar (ARG), Andrés Bartel (URU)

30 November 2018	Chile	81–63	Virgin Islands	Valdivia
21:30	Scoring by quarter: 18–18, 30–9, 14–22, 19–14
	Pts: Herrera 26; Rebs: M. Suárez 16; Asts: D. Silva, M. Suárez 2	Boxscore	Pts: Aska 22; Rebs: Aska 7 Asts: Hodge, Milligan 2	Arena: Coliseo Municipal Antonio Azurmendy Riveros; Referees: Alejandro Sánchez (URU), Omar Bermúdez (MEX), Grant Todey (USA)

3 December 2018	Brazil	67–94	Canada	São Paulo
20:00	Scoring by quarter: 20–18, 14–27, 18–31, 15–18
	Pts: Marquinhos 17; Rebs: Lima 6 Asts: Machado 6	Boxscore	Pts: Wiltjer 25; Rebs: Landry, Wiltjer 7 Asts: P. Scrubb 6	Arena: Ginásio Poliesportivo Wlamir Marques; Attendance: 4,500; Referees: Jorge Vázquez (PUR), Alejandro Sánchez (URU), Omar Bermúdez (MEX)

3 December 2018	Virgin Islands	76–77	Venezuela	Saint Thomas
18:15	Scoring by quarter: 14–12, 21–22, 22–22, 19–21
	Pts: Milligan 22; Rebs: Milligan 13; Asts: Milligan 3	Boxscore	Pts: Zamora 16; Rebs: Echenique 15; Asts: Guillént, G. Vargas 6	Arena: Sports and Fitness Center; Referees: Roberto Vázquez (PUR), Jesed Díaz (PUR), Julio Anaya (PAN)

3 December 2018	Chile	65–74	Dominican Republic	Valdivia
20:30	Scoring by quarter: 11–18, 17–26, 12–11, 25–19
	Pts: Herrera 17; Rebs: M. Suárez 10; Asts: D. Silva 3	Boxscore	Pts: Mendoza 20; Rebs: Rhett 13; Asts: Suero 5	Arena: Coliseo Municipal Antonio Azurmendy Riveros; Referees: Leandro Lezcano (ARG), Leonardo Zalazar (ARG), Andrés Bartel (URU)

21 February 2019	Virgin Islands	80–104	Brazil	Saint Thomas
19:00	Scoring by quarter: 20–22, 17–29, 21–27, 22–26
	Pts: Milligan 25; Rebs: Milligan 11; Asts: Milligan 4	Boxscore	Pts: Marquinhos 22; Rebs: Mineiro 10; Asts: Matheus 8	Arena: Sports and Fitness Center; Attendance: 800; Referees: Leonardo Zalazar (ARG), Christian Wilmore (BAH), Norval Young (BVI)

21 February 2019	Canada	85–46	Chile	St. John's, Newfoundland
19:00	Scoring by quarter: 16–9, 18–12, 29–16, 22–9
	Pts: Heslip 14; Rebs: Wiltjer 14; Asts: Kajami-Keane 5	Boxscore	Pts: Herrera 11; Rebs: M. Suárez 8 Asts: Herrera 4	Arena: Mile One Centre; Attendance: 3,019; Referees: Roberto Vázquez (PUR), Leandro Lezcano (ARG), Julio Anaya (PAN)

21 February 2019	Dominican Republic	72–67	Venezuela	Santo Domingo
20:30	Scoring by quarter: 22–13, 12–19, 12–9, 26–26
	Pts: García 16; Rebs: Mendoza, Roberts 5 Asts: Ramón 6	Boxscore	Pts: G. Vargas 26; Rebs: G. Vargas 8 Asts: Colmenares, G. Vargas 4	Arena: Palacio de los Deportes Virgilio Travieso Soto; Attendance: 8,200; Referees: Fabricio Vito (ARG), Krishna Domínguez (MEX), José Melgarejo (COL)

24 February 2019	Canada	95–55	Venezuela	St. John's, Newfoundland
16:00	Scoring by quarter: 24–8, 21–15, 27–17, 23–15
	Pts: Wiltjer 19; Rebs: Wiltjer 8 Asts: Scrubb 8	Boxscore	Pts: Sifontes 10; Rebs: Graterol 9 Asts: Guillént, G. Vargas 3	Arena: Mile One Centre; Referees: Jorge Vázquez (PUR), Leonardo Zalazar (ARG), Alejandro Sánchez (URU)

24 February 2019	Virgin Islands	64–59	Chile	Saint Thomas
19:00	Scoring by quarter: 18–15, 12–16, 13–16, 21–12
	Pts: Milligan 26; Rebs: Smith 14; Asts: Milligan 7	Boxscore	Pts: Carrión 14; Rebs: Arroyo, D. Silva 7 Asts: D. Silva 6	Arena: Sports and Fitness Center; Attendance: 350; Referees: Fabricio Vito (ARG), Jesed Díaz (PUR), Andrés Bartel (URU)

25 February 2019	Dominican Republic	63–71	Brazil	Santo Domingo
20:30	Scoring by quarter: 20–17, 12–21, 16–12, 15–21
	Pts: Vargas 15; Rebs: Vargas 9 Asts: Liz 4	Boxscore	Pts: Matheus 14; Rebs: Varejão 12; Asts: Luz 7	Arena: Palacio de los Deportes Virgilio Travieso Soto; Referees: Leandro Lezcano (ARG), Juan Fernández (ARG), Omar Bermúdez (MEX)

=== Best fourth placed team ===
Pos	Grp	Team	Pld	W	L	PF	PA	PD	Pts	Qualification
1	F	Dominican Republic	12	7	5	979	921	+58	19	2019 FIBA Basketball World Cup
2	E	Uruguay	12	6	6	824	909	−85	18	

Source: FIBA

== Statistical leaders ==
=== Players ===
Points

Pos.	Name	PPG
1	(United States Virgin Islands) Georgio Milligan	18.2
2	(United States Virgin Islands) Walter Hodge	18.0
3	(Argentina) Luis Scola	16.7
4	(Uruguay) Esteban Batista	16.4
5	(Cuba) Jasiel Rivero	16.2

Rebounds

Pos.	Name	RPG
1	(Cuba) Javier Justiz	12.8
2	(Uruguay) Esteban Batista	9.0
3	(Brazil) Anderson Varejão	8.3
4	(Argentina) Luis Scola	8.1
5	(Venezuela) Gregory Echenique	8.0

Assists

Pos.	Name	APG
1	(United States) Travis Trice	5.8
2	(Mexico) Paul Stoll	5.7
3	(Venezuela) Gregory Vargas	4.9
3	(Panama) Trevor Gaskins	4.8
3	(Venezuela) Heissler Guillént	4.8

Steals

Pos.	Name	SPG
1	(Mexico) Paul Stoll	2.2
2	(Paraguay) Gabriel Peralta	2.0
3	(Uruguay) Santiago Vidal	1.9
4	(Mexico) Juan Toscano	1.9
5	(Dominican Republic) Rigoberto Mendoza	1.8

Blocks

Pos.	Name	BPG
1	(United States Virgin Islands) LaRon Smith	2.4
2	(Canada) Joel Anthony	1.8
3	(Cuba) Jasiel Rivero	1.5
4	(Cuba) Javier Justiz	1.3
5	(Puerto Rico) Jorge Díaz	1.3

Other statistical leaders

Stat	Name	Avg.
Field goal percentage	(Uruguay) Esteban Batista	56.4%
3-point FG percentage	(Canada) Melvin Ejim	57.9%
Free throw percentage	(Dominican Republic) Edward Santana	87.5%
Turnovers	(United States Virgin Islands) Walter Hodge	5.0
Fouls	(Colombia) Michaell Jackson	4.0
