= 2019 United States FIBA Basketball World Cup team =

International basketball team

The United States men's national basketball team competed in the 2019 FIBA Basketball World Cup and finished in seventh place. After winning the past two World Cups in 2010 and 2014, they were seeking to become the first country to capture three straight gold medals. With high-profile players electing not to participate, Team USA was devoid of A-list players from the National Basketball Association (NBA). They were also impacted throughout by injuries to players Jayson Tatum and Marcus Smart. The Americans lost to France in the quarterfinals, ending their 58-game winning streak in FIBA (International Basketball Federation) and Olympic competition. Normally played every four years, the tournament was moved from its expected 2018 playing to avoid conflicting with soccer's World Cup schedule.

After rule changes by FIBA in 2015, the US no longer automatically qualified for the World Cup despite winning the Olympics in 2016. Changes in timing also resulted in the qualifying rounds overlapping with the NBA's season. Consequently, USA Basketball decided to deploy squads of players mostly from the NBA G League, the NBA's development league. Coached by Jeff Van Gundy, they qualified the US for the World Cup, where the Americans switched to a team of NBA players coached by Gregg Popovich. They finished the World Cup as one of the top two countries in the Americas, directly qualifying them for the 2020 Summer Olympics in Tokyo.

== Background ==
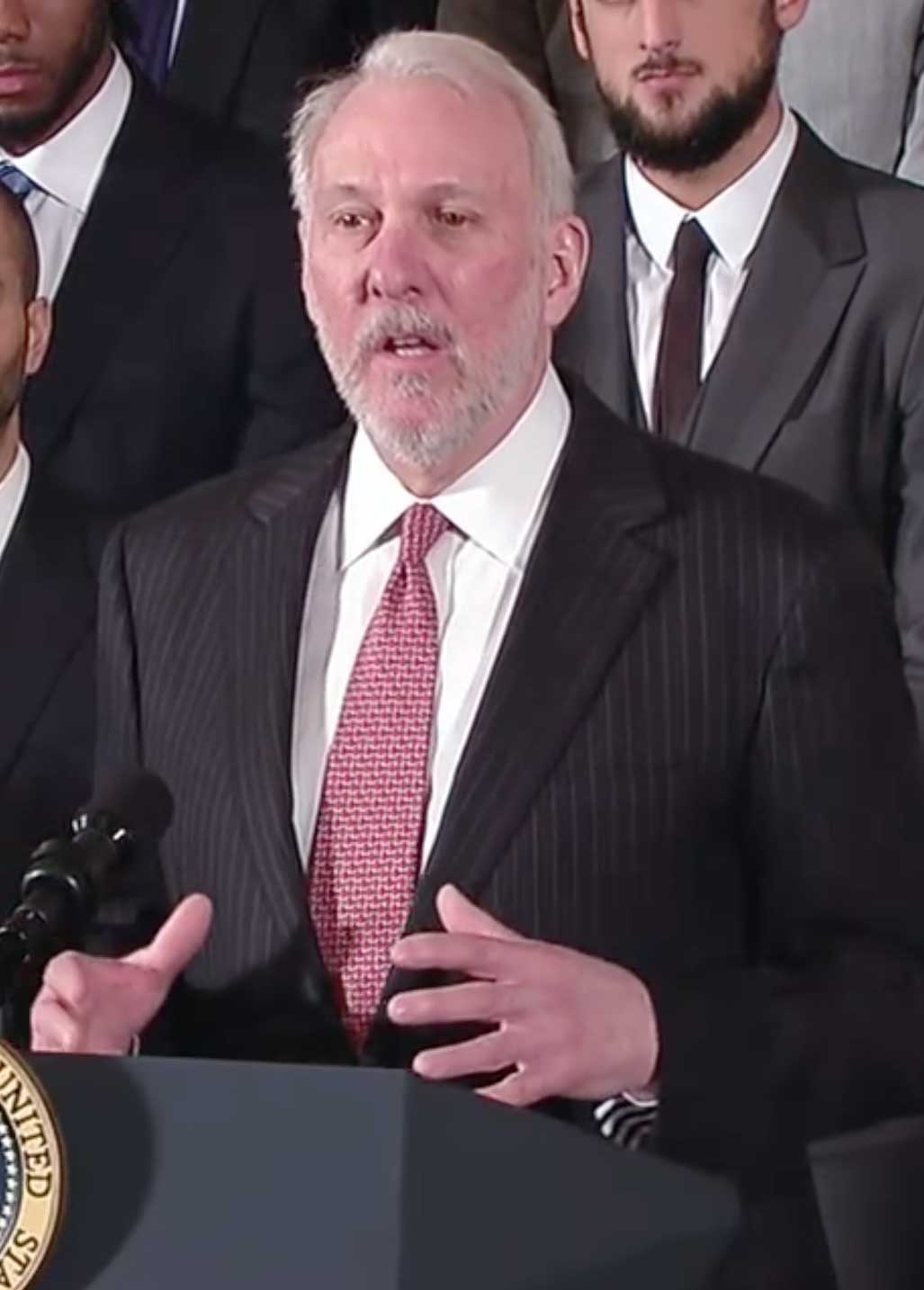
Gregg Popovich (pictured) replaced Mike Krzyzewski as the US head coach.

In 2015, FIBA changed the World Cup qualification process into a two-round tournament of home-and-away round robins over 16 months, which was similar to FIFA World Cup's process for soccer. Olympic gold no longer resulted in an automatic World Cup bid. The US was in the Americas group of 16 teams battling for 12 spots in the second round of the qualifying stage and finally for seven World Cup berths. To be eligible for the World Cup, the US first had to participate in the 2017 FIBA AmeriCup. The United States had not played in the FIBA Americas tournament since 2007; they had been exempt from qualifying, having won every prior Olympics and world championships.

Players for the qualifying squads were chosen by a USA Basketball qualification committee. Their teams were made up of players primarily from the NBA G League, since FIBA had changed the World Cup qualifiers from summer to year-round, most of which conflicted with the seasons of top professional leagues such as the NBA and the EuroLeague. Unlike in soccer, there is no culture for leagues to schedule in-season breaks for players to compete for their national team. The coach for the qualifiers was Jeff Van Gundy, who is a basketball analyst for ESPN/ABC and a former NBA head coach who coached in the NBA Finals. He made his national team coaching debut in the 2017 Americup. Van Gundy and his squads were tasked with qualifying the US for the World Cup, when the U.S. would switch to a team of NBA players coached by Gregg Popovich. The five-time NBA champion Popovich of the San Antonio Spurs took over the national team from Mike Krzyzewski, who won three Olympic gold medals and two World Cups for the US.

== Qualification ==
Playing games in North and South America, the US qualified for the World Cup after going 10–2. They relied on an assortment G League players and free agents, using a total of 54 different players in the 12 games.

=== First round ===
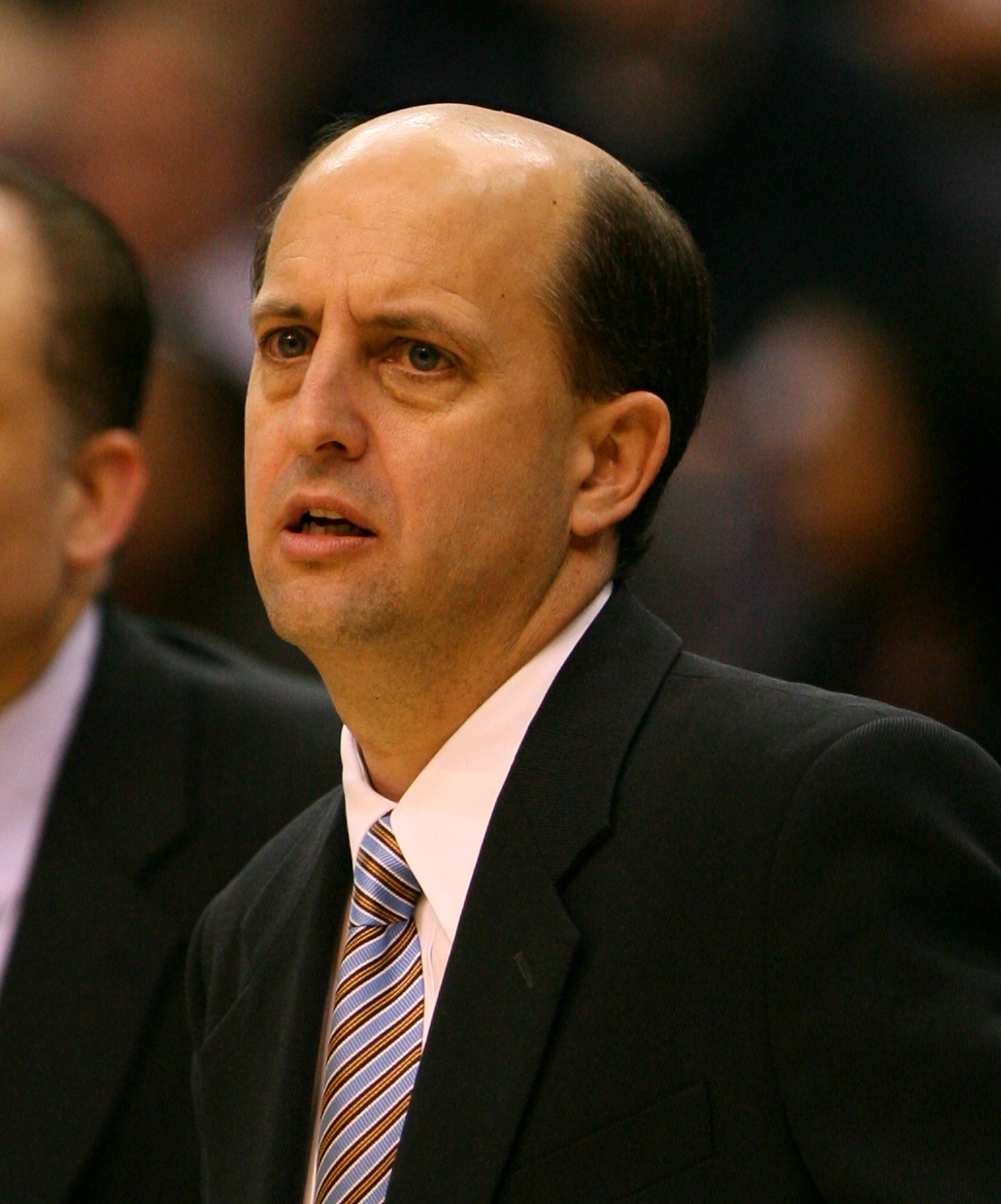
Jeff Van Gundy was the US coach during the World Cup qualifiers.

In the first round of qualification, games were played in three windows in November 2017 along with February and June 2018. The November team included four players from the US squad that went 5–0 to win the AmeriCup. Only two players—forward Travis Wear and guard Larry Drew II—returned for Team USA in their second qualifying window. The final window was also the first that was not during the NBA season. While some NBA players joined their national teams, the US continued playing with G League players. Trey McKinney-Jones and Marcus Thornton joined the Americans after needing to withdraw in February on account of 10-day contracts they had signed with NBA teams. On June 28, 2018, the US lost 78–70 to Mexico. It was the Americans first loss under Van Gundy and just the second defeat in 30 games against Mexico. It was also Team USA's first loss at the national-team level since 2006. The Mexico squad had just four players from its November team that lost by 36 points to the US They added players from various professional leagues who were unavailable earlier, including former NBA player Gustavo Ayón, who was coming off a EuroLeague championship with Real Madrid. The Americans advanced after finishing the round 5–1.

Pos	Team	Pld	W	L	PF	PA	PD	Pts	Qualification
1	United States	6	5	1	506	396	+110	11	Second round
2	Puerto Rico	6	4	2	516	479	+37	10	Second round
3	Mexico	6	3	3	439	463	−24	9	Second round
4	Cuba	6	0	6	380	503	−123	6	

Source: FIBA
Rules for classification: 1) Points; 2) Head-to-head results; 3) Points difference; 4) Points scored.

November 23, 2017	Puerto Rico	78–85	United States	Orlando, United States
19:30	Scoring by quarter: 23–17, 16–21, 19–23, 20–24
	Pts: Vassallo 16; Rebs: Huertas, Sánchez 5 Asts: Rodríguez 8	Boxscore	Pts: Hearn, Warney 17; Rebs: Warney 11; Asts: Christon, Munford 4	Arena: CFE Arena; Game moved from Puerto Rico because of Hurricane Maria. Referees: Michael Weiland (CAN), Julio Anaya (PAN), Leandro Lezcano (ARG)

November 26, 2017	United States	91–55	Mexico	Greensboro
17:00	Scoring by quarter: 25–12, 15–17, 32–18, 19–8
	Pts: four players 14; Rebs: Wear 10; Asts: Sloan 7	Boxscore	Pts: Ramos 12; Rebs: Hernández, Ramos 7 Asts: Stoll 4	Arena: Greensboro Coliseum Fieldhouse; Attendance: 3,000; Referees: Guilherme Locatelli (BRA), Americo Rodríguez (VEN), Alejandro Sánchez (URU)

February 23, 2018	United States	84–48	Cuba	Santa Cruz
20:00	Scoring by quarter: 21–8, 20–16, 21–12, 22–12
	Pts: Purvis 14; Rebs: Williams 12; Asts: Williams 6	Boxscore	Pts: Mensía 11; Rebs: Justiz 10; Asts: Guzmán, Martínez 3	Arena: Kaiser Permanente Arena; Attendance: 2,033; Referees: Michael Weiland (CAN), Carlos Peralta (ECU), Andreia Silva (BRA)

February 26, 2018	United States	83–75	Puerto Rico	Santa Cruz
20:00	Scoring by quarter: 20–13, 27–17, 19–22, 17–23
	Pts: Harrison 16; Rebs: Williams 11; Asts: Drew II 7	Boxscore	Pts: Clavell 23; Rebs: Andújar 7 Asts: Rodríguez 5	Arena: Kaiser Permanente Arena; Attendance: 1,984; Referees: Guilherme Locatelli (BRA), Alejandro Sánchez (URU), Christian Wilmore (BAH)

June 28, 2018	Mexico	78–70	United States	Mexico City
20:30	Scoring by quarter: 31–10, 14–18, 10–23, 23–19
	Pts: Cruz 24; Rebs: Ayón 9 Asts: Ayón 7	Boxscore	Pts: Thornton 14; Rebs: Jones 6 Asts: Munford 5	Arena: Gimnasio Olímpico Juan de la Barrera; Referees: Guilherme Locatelli (BRA), Matthew Kallio (CAN), Michael Scott (CAN)

July 1, 2018	Cuba	62–93	United States	Havana
16:00	Scoring by quarter: 28–24, 9–26, 9–24, 16–19
	Pts: Guzmán 16; Rebs: Justiz 9 Asts: Rivero 3	Boxscore	Pts: Munford, Hearn 16; Rebs: four players 5 Asts: two players 4	Arena: Coliseo de la Ciudad Deportiva; Referees: Cristiano Maranho (BRA), Fabricio Vito (ARG), Sebastian Negron (CHI)

=== Second round ===
In the first window of the second round, the US roster had a larger presence of players with NBA experience, though they were still mainly G League players. The June–July window in the first round conflicted with the NBA free agency period and NBA Summer League, while its first two windows were during the NBA season. For the second window, the United States again relied exclusively on G-Leaguers, using nine current players and three free agents with previous NBA experience. Nine of the 12 players had not played in the eight earlier qualifiers. The US qualified for the World Cup after rallying with a late 12–0 run against Uruguay to win 78–70.

Pos	Team	Pld	W	L	PF	PA	PD	Pts	Qualification
1	United States	12	10	2	1034	814	+220	22	2019 FIBA Basketball World Cup
2	Argentina	12	9	3	1037	854	+183	21	2019 FIBA Basketball World Cup
3	Puerto Rico	12	8	4	967	939	+28	20	2019 FIBA Basketball World Cup
4	Uruguay	12	6	6	824	909	−85	18	
5	Mexico	12	5	7	875	903	−28	17	
6	Panama	12	4	8	844	930	−86	16	

Source: FIBA
Rules for classification: 1) Points; 2) Head-to-head results; 3) Points difference; 4) Points scored.

September 14, 2018	United States	114–57	Uruguay	Paradise
19:00	Scoring by quarter: 28–8, 28–16, 28–16, 30–17
	Pts: Mason 16; Rebs: Ellenson 9 Asts: Mason 8	Boxscore	Pts: Rodríguez 11; Rebs: García 6 Asts: García 5	Arena: Cox Pavilion; Referees: Cristiano Maranho (BRA), Matthew Kallio (CAN), Carlos Peralta (ECU)

September 17, 2018	Panama	48–78	United States	Panama City
20:00	Scoring by quarter: 7–18, 16–18, 15–21, 10–21
	Pts: Carter 16; Rebs: Mitchell 7 Asts: Muñoz 3	Boxscore	Pts: Hearn 12; Rebs: Ellenson 11; Asts: White 4	Arena: Roberto Durán Arena; Referees: Guilherme Locatelli (BRA), Rodrigo Mejia (COL), Felipe Ibarra (CHI)

November 29, 2018	Argentina	80–63	United States	La Rioja
21:30	Scoring by quarter: 13–16, 22–16, 23–8, 22–23
	Pts: Laprovíttola 17; Rebs: Scola 9 Asts: Laprovíttola 8	Boxscore	Pts: Trice 16; Rebs: Zeller 12; Asts: Trice 4	Arena: Superdomo; Attendance: 10,000; Referees: Marcos Benito (BRA), Michael Weiland (CAN), Carlos Peralta (ECU)

December 2, 2018	Uruguay	70–78	United States	Montevideo
20:00	Scoring by quarter: 17–22, 23–17, 14–11, 16–28
	Pts: Fitipaldo 17; Rebs: Batista, Parodi 7 Asts: Parodi, Vidal 5	Boxscore	Pts: Trice 17; Rebs: Moreland 13; Asts: Trice 4	Arena: Antel Arena; Referees: Cristiano Maranho (BRA), Daniel García (VEN), Nathaniel Saunders (CAN)

February 22, 2019	United States	111–80	Panama	Greensboro
19:00	Scoring by quarter: 22–21, 31–25, 27–18, 31–16
	Pts: Reynolds 26; Rebs: Frazier II, Onuaku 8 Asts: Trice 10	Boxscore	Pts: Carter 18; Rebs: Carter 7 Asts: Gaskins 7	Arena: Coliseum Fieldhouse; Attendance: 1,272; Referees: Michael Weiland (CAN), Americo Rodríguez (VEN), Sebastián Negrón (CHI)

February 25, 2019	United States	84–83	Argentina	Greensboro
19:00	Scoring by quarter: 22–14, 20–21, 17–30, 25–18
	Pts: Frazier II 23; Rebs: Adams 6 Asts: Trice 6	Boxscore	Pts: Redivo 18; Rebs: Brussino 6 Asts: Faggiano 9	Arena: Coliseum Fieldhouse; Attendance: 1,221; Referees: Cristiano Maranho (BRA), Carlos Peralta (ECU), Christian Wilmore (BAH)

== World Cup roster ==
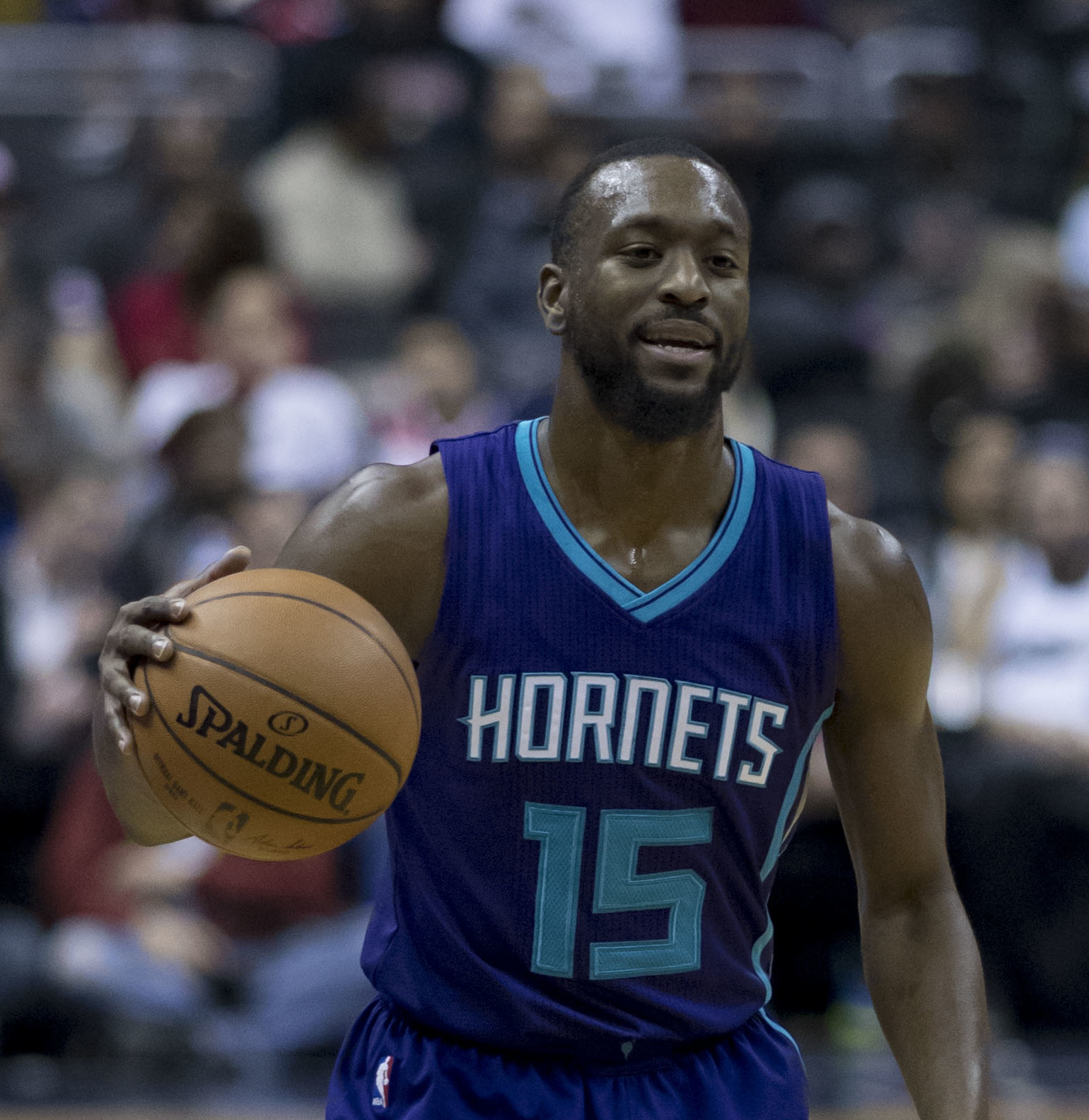
Kemba Walker was the lone Team USA player who was on the All-NBA Team in 2019.

An initial pool of 35 players was named in April 2018 as candidates for the United States' 12-man roster. The list included 11 members from their 2016 Olympic gold-medal team, (Note: The other team member, Carmelo Anthony, retired from the national team after winning his third Olympic gold medal in 2016.) and five players who had won nine of the previous 10 NBA Most Valuable Player Awards. (Note: LeBron James (2009, 2010, 2012, 2013), Kevin Durant (2014), Stephen Curry (2015, 2016), Russell Westbrook (2017), James Harden (2018)) The US held its first minicamp in July 2018, which 23 of the 35 players attended. In the past, USA Basketball managing director Jerry Colangelo had mandated that players attended camps or risk disqualification; however, rules were relaxed in recent years.

In June 2019, a group of 20 players were initially invited to training camp to be held in Las Vegas in early August. A number of players withdrew leading up to camp, but replacements were named, leaving 15 candidates to vie for 12 spots on the World Cup roster. Only four of the remaining players had been NBA All-Stars: Brook Lopez, Kyle Lowry, Khris Middleton, and Kemba Walker. Of the 11 Americans who were among the 15 All-NBA selections in 2018–19, only third-team member Walker remained. Lowry withdrew after his thumb had not recovered from surgery a month earlier to repair a torn tendon he suffered in the 2019 NBA playoffs during the Toronto Raptors' championship run.

Harrison Barnes was the only player with Olympic experience (2016) on the final US roster. It had become customary for the Americans' World Cup teams to have few former Olympians. Barnes and Mason Plumlee (2014 World Cup) were the only former senior-level national team players. While Team USA typically drew fewer star players for the World Cup than the Olympics, the turnout was low even by World Cup standards. Only four members from the original 35-player pool were left on the final roster. A factor cited by Colangelo was FIBA moving the World Cup and the Olympics to back-to-back years, and its conflicts with the NBA schedule. Six NBA teams had preseason games scheduled overseas in 2019–20. (Note: Toronto and the Houston Rockets were to play in Japan, the Brooklyn Nets and the Los Angeles Lakers in China, and the Sacramento Kings and the Indiana Pacers in India.)

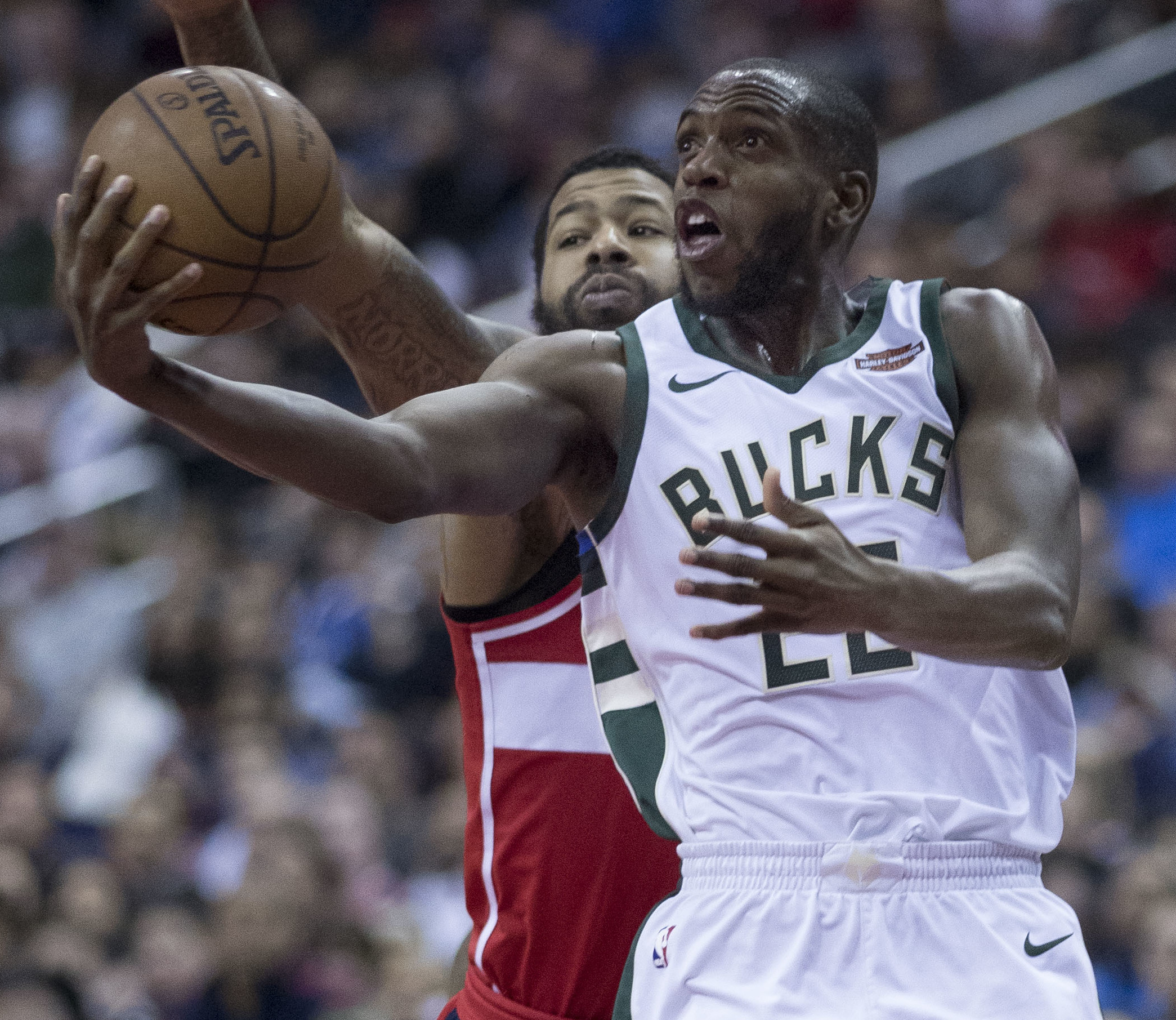
Khris Middleton joined Walker as the only team members who were NBA All-Stars in 2019.

The US team was left with only two players, Middleton and Walker, who were All-Stars in the prior season. Measured either by All-Star or All-NBA selections, the remaining roster ranked among the least accomplished of any US Olympic or World Cup roster made up of NBA players since they were first allowed in 1992. Excluded was the 1998 World Championship team, which did not include NBA players due to the 1998–99 NBA lockout; they used a mix of non-NBA pro players and college players and finished with the bronze medal. The 2019 squad's two All-Stars from the prior season tied the low set by the 2004 Olympic team, which infamously did not win gold, for the fewest players coming off an All-Star season leading up to an international competition. The five career All-Star appearances of Lopez, Middleton, and Walker was the lowest ever, roughly half the total of past World Cup squads. Their All-NBA total also ranked the lowest. (Note: Ranking based on scoring system of five points for a first-team All-NBA player, three points for second team and one for third. The 2023 World Cup team did not have any players that had been All-NBA before.)

Walker, who had recently signed with the Boston Celtics as a free agent, was joined on the US team by Celtics teammates Jaylen Brown, Jayson Tatum, and Marcus Smart. It was the first time Team USA had four teammates from the same NBA team. (Note: The 2012 Olympic team had Oklahoma City Thunder teammates Kevin Durant, Russell Westbrook and James Harden, while the 2016 Olympic squad had Durant, Draymond Green and Klay Thompson from the Golden State Warriors.)

United States national basketball team – 2019 FIBA Basketball World Cup roster
Players
Coaches

Pos.	No.	Name	Age – Date of birth	Height	Club	Ctr.
G	4	Derrick White	25 – July 2, 1994	6 ft 5 in (1.96 m)	San Antonio Spurs	(United States)
G	5	Donovan Mitchell	22 – September 7, 1996	6 ft 3 in (1.91 m)	Utah Jazz	(United States)
G	6	Joe Harris	27 – September 6, 1991	6 ft 6 in (1.98 m)	Brooklyn Nets	(United States)
G	7	Marcus Smart	25 – March 6, 1994	6 ft 4 in (1.93 m)	Boston Celtics	(United States)
F	8	Harrison Barnes	27 – May 30, 1992	6 ft 8 in (2.03 m)	Sacramento Kings	(United States)
F	9	Jaylen Brown	22 – October 24, 1996	6 ft 7 in (2.01 m)	Boston Celtics	(United States)
F	10	Jayson Tatum	21 – March 3, 1998	6 ft 8 in (2.03 m)	Boston Celtics	(United States)
C	11	Mason Plumlee	29 – March 5, 1990	6 ft 11 in (2.11 m)	Denver Nuggets	(United States)
C	12	Myles Turner	23 – March 24, 1996	6 ft 11 in (2.11 m)	Indiana Pacers	(United States)
C	13	Brook Lopez	31 – January 4, 1988	7 ft 0 in (2.13 m)	Milwaukee Bucks	(United States)
F	14	Khris Middleton	28 – August 12, 1991	6 ft 8 in (2.03 m)	Milwaukee Bucks	(United States)
G	15	Kemba Walker	29 – May 8, 1990	6 ft 1 in (1.85 m)	Charlotte Hornets	(United States)

Head coach

- (United States) Gregg Popovich

Assistant coach(es)

- (United States) Steve Kerr
- (United States) Lloyd Pierce
- (United States) Jay Wright

Legend

- (C) Team captain
- Club – describes last
  club before the tournament
- Age – as of 31 August 2019

Roster

The following were candidates to make the team:

Earlier candidates
Player	NBA team (Note: Player's team at the time they were removed from consideration, listed under column Removed)	Added	Removed	Reason
Devin Booker	Phoenix Suns	April 6, 2018	June 10, 2019	Not named to 20-man roster
Jimmy Butler	Philadelphia 76ers	April 6, 2018	June 10, 2019	Not named to 20-man roster
Mike Conley Jr.	Memphis Grizzlies	April 6, 2018	June 10, 2019	Not named to 20-man roster
DeMarcus Cousins	Golden State Warriors	April 6, 2018	June 10, 2019	Not named to 20-man roster
Stephen Curry	Golden State Warriors	April 6, 2018	June 10, 2019	Not named to 20-man roster
DeMar DeRozan	San Antonio Spurs	April 6, 2018	June 10, 2019	Not named to 20-man roster
Kevin Durant	Golden State Warriors	April 6, 2018	June 10, 2019	Not named to 20-man roster
Paul George	Oklahoma City Thunder	April 6, 2018	June 10, 2019	Not named to 20-man roster
Draymond Green	Golden State Warriors	April 6, 2018	June 10, 2019	Not named to 20-man roster
Blake Griffin	Detroit Pistons	April 6, 2018	June 10, 2019	Not named to 20-man roster
Gordon Hayward	Boston Celtics	April 6, 2018	June 10, 2019	Not named to 20-man roster
Kyrie Irving	Boston Celtics	April 6, 2018	June 10, 2019	Not named to 20-man roster
LeBron James	Los Angeles Lakers	April 6, 2018	June 10, 2019	Not named to 20-man roster
DeAndre Jordan	New York Knicks	April 6, 2018	June 10, 2019	Not named to 20-man roster
Kawhi Leonard	Toronto Raptors	April 6, 2018	June 10, 2019	Not named to 20-man roster
Victor Oladipo	Indiana Pacers	April 6, 2018	June 10, 2019	Not named to 20-man roster
Chris Paul	Houston Rockets	April 6, 2018	June 10, 2019	Not named to 20-man roster
Isaiah Thomas	Denver Nuggets	April 6, 2018	June 10, 2019	Not named to 20-man roster
Klay Thompson	Golden State Warriors	April 6, 2018	June 10, 2019	Not named to 20-man roster
John Wall	Washington Wizards	April 6, 2018	June 10, 2019	Not named to 20-man roster
Russell Westbrook	Oklahoma City Thunder	April 6, 2018	June 10, 2019	Not named to 20-man roster
Anthony Davis	Los Angeles Lakers	April 6, 2018	July 15, 2019	Withdrew
James Harden	Houston Rockets	April 6, 2018	July 19, 2019	Withdrew
Bradley Beal	Washington Wizards	April 6, 2018	July 22, 2019	Withdrew
Tobias Harris	Philadelphia 76ers	April 6, 2018	July 22, 2019	Withdrew
Damian Lillard	Portland Trail Blazers	April 6, 2018	July 23, 2019	Withdrew
Kevin Love	Cleveland Cavaliers	April 6, 2018	July 24, 2019	Withdrew
CJ McCollum	Portland Trail Blazers	April 6, 2018	July 25, 2019	Withdrew
Eric Gordon	Houston Rockets	April 6, 2018	July 25, 2019	Withdrew
Paul Millsap	Denver Nuggets	June 10, 2019	July 25, 2019	Withdrew
Andre Drummond	Detroit Pistons	April 6, 2018	August 1, 2019	Withdrew
Montrezl Harrell	Los Angeles Clippers	July 25, 2019	August 1, 2019	Withdrew
Julius Randle	New York Knicks	July 25, 2019	August 3, 2019	Withdrew
Thaddeus Young	Chicago Bulls	July 25, 2019	August 9, 2019	Roster cut
Bam Adebayo	Miami Heat	August 1, 2019	August 9, 2019	Roster cut
Marvin Bagley III	Sacramento Kings	August 9, 2019	August 11, 2019	Withdrew
Kyle Lowry	Toronto Raptors	April 6, 2018	August 12, 2019	Injured
P. J. Tucker	Houston Rockets	June 10, 2019	August 16, 2019	Injured
De'Aaron Fox	Sacramento Kings	August 9, 2019	August 17, 2019	Withdrew
Kyle Kuzma	Los Angeles Lakers	June 10, 2019	August 24, 2019	Injured

== Exhibition games ==
Team USA was 3–1 in exhibition games. They split two games against Australia, losing the second game 98–94. The loss ended a 78-game winning streak in major international tournaments and exhibitions with an NBA roster, which dated back to the 2006 FIBA World Championship team.

August 16, 2019
10:00 PM ET

Boxscore

Spain	81–90	United States
Scoring by quarter: 20–31, 20–23, 17–17, 23–19
Pts: Gasol 19; Rebs: Gasol 4 Asts: Rubio 7		Pts: Mitchell 13; Rebs: Walker 6 Asts: Walker 8

Honda Center, Anaheim

August 22, 2019
5:30 AM ET

Boxscore

Australia	86–102	United States
Scoring by quarter: 20–22, 23–22, 18–32, 25–26
Pts: Goulding, Mills 19; Rebs: Landale 7 Asts: Dellavedova 6		Pts: Walker 23; Rebs: Turner 14; Asts: Tatum 4

Marvel Stadium, Melbourne
Attendance: 51,218

August 24, 2019
12:00 AM ET

Boxscore

Australia	98–94	United States
Scoring by quarter: 23–26, 25–23, 30–27, 20–18
Pts: Mills 30; Rebs: Bogut 9 Asts: Ingles 7		Pts: Walker 22; Rebs: Barnes 6 Asts: Smart 3

Marvel Stadium, Melbourne
Attendance: 52,079

August 26, 2019
5:30 AM ET

Boxscore

Canada	68–84	United States
Scoring by quarter: 9–20, 22–26, 16–18, 21–20
Pts: Wiltjer 18; Rebs: Birch 6 Asts: Pangos, Nembhard, Wiltjer 2		Pts: Brown 19; Rebs: Turner 15; Asts: Mitchell 4

Qudos Bank Arena, Sydney
Attendance: 15,155

== Group phase ==
=== First round ===
Pos	Team	Pld	W	L	PF	PA	PD	Pts	Qualification
1	United States	3	3	0	279	204	+75	6	Second round
2	Czech Republic	3	2	1	247	240	+7	5	Second round
3	Turkey	3	1	2	254	251	+3	4	17th–32nd classification
4	Japan	3	0	3	188	273	−85	3	17th–32nd classification

Source: FIBA
Rules for classification: Tiebreakers

==== Czech Republic ====
September 1, 2019
20:30

Boxscore

Czech Republic	67–88	United States
Scoring by quarter: 14–17, 15–26, 19–23, 19–22
Pts: Satoranský 17; Rebs: Bohačík 9 Asts: Satoranský 5		Pts: Mitchell 16; Rebs: Turner 7 Asts: Walker 4

Shanghai Oriental Sports Center, Shanghai
Attendance: 17,800
Referees: Manuel Mazzoni (ITA), Wojciech Liszka (POL), Duan Zhu (CHN)

Donovan Mitchell scored a team-high 16 points and led all Americans with 25 minutes played as the US won 88–67 over the Czech Republic. The Czechs took an early 11–7 lead, but the US pretty much cruised the rest of the way. NBA player Tomáš Satoranský scored a game-high 17 points and added five assists for the Czech Republic, whose game plan was to have their 6-foot-7-inch (2.01 m) point guard use his 6-inch (15 cm) advantage over Walker. However, Walker held his own on defense and had 13 points along with four assists. Barnes was the second-leading scorer for Team USA with 14 points.

==== Turkey ====
September 3, 2019

20:30

Boxscore

United States	93–92 (OT)	Turkey
Scoring by quarter: 26–21, 21–21, 18–19, 16–20, Overtime: 12–11
Pts: Middleton 15; Rebs: Tatum 11; Asts: Walker 7		Pts: İlyasova 23; Rebs: İlyasova 14; Asts: Osman 4

Shanghai Oriental Sports Center, Shanghai
Attendance: 18,000
Referees: Aleksandar Glišić (SRB), Ferdinand Pascual (PHI), Wojciech Liszka (POL)

Middleton made two free throws with 2.1 seconds remaining in overtime to put the US ahead 93–92, and they hung on to win after Turkey's Ersan Ilyasova missed a 3-pointer as time expired. The Turks were ahead 92–91 with under 20 seconds remaining, but Cedi Osman and Doğuş Balbay missed four straight free throws to keep the Americans in the game. Tatum had forced overtime by making two of his three free throws after he was fouled shooting a 3-pointer with 0.1 seconds left in regulation.

The US led 10–2 early, and were never behind in the first half. They led 26–21 after one quarter, and were up 41–26 with 5:33 remaining in the half. However, US-born Scottie Wilbekin, who was naturalized in Turkey a year before, led a 12–0 run, and the contest remained close for the rest of the game. Ranked No. 17 in the world, Turkey figured to be the US team's toughest competition in the first round. Their lineup featured NBA players Ilyasova, Osman, Furkan Korkmaz and Semih Erden. Ilyasova had a game-high 23 points and 14 rebounds in 38 minutes. The Turks played most of the game using a 2–3 zone defense, which stalled Team USA's offense. The Americans made 14-of-40 from 3-point range and just 13-of-37 on 2-pointers.

Tatum sprained his left ankle while making the pass to a driving Middleton which led to the game-winning free throws. Initially ruled out for at least the next two games, he missed the remainder of the World Cup.

==== Japan ====
September 5, 2019
20:30

Boxscore

United States	98–45	Japan
Scoring by quarter: 23–9, 33–14, 28–8, 14–14
Pts: Brown 20; Rebs: Turner 9 Asts: Walker 8		Pts: Baba 18; Rebs: Takeuchi 6 Asts: Watanabe 2

Shanghai Oriental Sports Center, Shanghai
Referees: Manuel Mazzoni (ITA), Andris Aunkrogers (LAT), Duan Zhu (CHN)

The US raced out to an 11–0 lead en route to a 53-point win over Japan, 98–45. Brown had 20 points and seven rebounds, and Walker scored 15 and Barnes added 14 in the Americans' best offensive performance to date. Team USA held Rui Hachimura, Japan's top player and the No. 9 overall pick of the 2019 NBA draft, to four points on two-of-eight shooting. Yudai Baba led the Japanese with 18 points and was their only player to score in double figures.

In addition to missing Tatum, the US played without Smart, who was suffering a left quad strain. Smart had missed most of training camp with a calf strain, also on his left side. The Americans had already qualified for the next round, which lowered the stakes for the game.

=== Second round ===
Pos	Team	Pld	W	L	PF	PA	PD	Pts	Qualification
1	United States	5	5	0	437	330	+107	10	Quarter-finals
2	Czech Republic	5	3	2	417	395	+22	8 (Note: Czech Republic 1–1, +15, Greece 1–1, +6, Brazil 1–1, –21)	Quarter-finals
3	Greece	5	3	2	403	382	+21	8	
4	Brazil	5	3	2	409	427	−18	8	

Source: FIBA
Rules for classification: Tiebreakers

==== Greece ====
September 7, 2019
20:30

Boxscore

United States	69–53	Greece
Scoring by quarter: 19–17, 19–8, 16–12, 15–16
Pts: Walker 15; Rebs: Brown 9 Asts: Walker 6		Pts: G. Antetokounmpo 15; Rebs: G. Antetokounmpo 13; Asts: Calathes 5

Shenzhen Bay Sports Centre, Shenzhen
Referees: Aleksandar Glišić (SRB), Ferdinand Pascual (PHI), Wojciech Liszka (POL)

Walker scored a team-high 15 points and had six assists in a 69–53 win over Greece. The NBA's reigning most valuable player, Giannis Antetokounmpo, had 15 points and 13 rebounds for the Greeks, but his plus-minus was -17 when he was in the game. Coach Popovich went to a small lineup at times, enabling the United States to switch effectively on pick and rolls by Antetokounmpo. American center Lopez did not play at all in the game. Antetokounmpo and his brother, Thanasis Antetokounmpo, had to be separated from the US team after a hard foul by Thanasis late in the game left Barnes on his stomach.

==== Brazil ====
September 9, 2019
20:30

Boxscore

United States	89–73	Brazil
Scoring by quarter: 21–18, 22–21, 24–17, 22–17
Pts: Turner, Walker 16; Rebs: Turner 8 Asts: Mitchell 7		Pts: Benite 21; Rebs: Varejao 8 Asts: Huertas 5

Shenzhen Bay Sports Centre, Shenzhen
Referees: Saverio Lanzarini (ITA), Ferdinand Pascual (PHI), Julio Anaya (PAN)

Walker and Myles Turner each scored 16 points in a 89–73 win over Brazil. The US advanced to the quarterfinals, and also clinched a berth in the 2020 Summer Olympics as one of the top two finishing teams from the Americas (along with Argentina).

== Final round ==
Fifth place
14 September – Beijing
Serbia	90
Czech Republic	81
Seventh place
14 September – Beijing
United States	87
Poland	74

5th–8th classification
12 September – Dongguan
Serbia	94
United States	89
12 September – Shanghai
Poland	84
Czech Republic	94

Quarter-finals
10 September – Dongguan
Argentina	97
Serbia	87
11 September – Dongguan
United States	79
France	89
10 September – Shanghai
Spain	90
Poland	78
11 September – Shanghai
Australia	82
Czech Republic	70

Semi-finals
13 September – Beijing
Argentina	80
France	66
13 September – Beijing
Spain (2OT)	95
Australia	88

Final
15 September – Beijing
Argentina	75
Spain	95
Third place game
15 September – Beijing
France	67
Australia	59

=== France ===
September 11, 2019
19:00

Boxscore

United States	79–89	France
Scoring by quarter: 18–18, 21–27, 27–18, 13–26
Pts: Mitchell 29; Rebs: Mitchell 6 Asts: Barnes, Mitchell 4		Pts: Fournier 22; Rebs: Gobert 16; Asts: Fournier 4

Dongfeng Nissan Cultural and Sports Centre, Dongguan
Attendance: 11,019
Referees: Guilherme Locatelli (BRA), Georgios Poursanidis (GRE), Ferdinand Pascual (PHI)

France came back from a seven-point fourth quarter deficit to win 89–79 over the US, ending the Americans' 58-game winning streak in FIBA and Olympic competition. Evan Fournier scored 22 points and reigning back-to-back NBA Defensive Player of the Year Award winner Rudy Gobert had 21 points and 16 rebounds for the French. Mitchell had 29 points for Team USA, but he was held scoreless in the final period. The loss dropped the US into the fifth-place bracket.

In the third quarter, Team USA was faced with its first 10-point deficit of the tournament, when Popovich went to a small lineup. The United States went on a 20–9 run to lead 66–63 entering the final period. However, the French outscored the Americans 20–5 over the final 6:59. The US missed seven of their 11 free throws in the quarter and committed three turnovers in the final 3:07.

=== Serbia ===
September 12, 2019
19:00

Boxscore

Serbia	94–89	United States
Scoring by quarter: 32–7, 12–33, 27–28, 23–21
Pts: Bogdanović 28; Rebs: Bjelica 5 Asts: Jokić 7		Pts: Barnes 22; Rebs: Middleton 6 Asts: Walker 8

Dongfeng Nissan Cultural and Sports Centre, Dongguan
Attendance: 9,540
Referees: Cristiano Maranho (BRA), Yu Jung (TPE), Luis Castillo (ESP)

Bogdan Bogdanović scored 28 points to lead Serbia to a 94–89 win over the United States, who were assured of their worst major tournament finish ever, surpassing their sixth-place showing in the 2002 World Championship. The Serbs outscored the Americans 32–7 in the first quarter for a 25-point lead, but the US held a 33–12 advantage in the second period to trail 44–40 at the half. Entering the tournament, the US and Serbia were considered the favorites to meet for the gold medal. Smart missed the game due to an injured left hand.

=== Poland ===
September 14, 2019
16:00

Boxscore

United States	87–74	Poland
Scoring by quarter: 28–14, 19–16, 16–25, 24–19
Pts: Mitchell 16; Rebs: Turner 8 Asts: Mitchell 10		Pts: Ponitka 18; Rebs: Ponitka 7 Asts: Slaughter 5

Wukesong Arena, Beijing
Attendance: 8,210
Referees: Aleksandar Glišić (SRB), Yu Jung (TPE), Takaki Kato (JPN)

The United States won 87–74 over Poland to finish the World Cup in seventh place. The Americans received strong performances from Mitchell (16 points and 10 assists) and Joe Harris (14 points). The US was up 17 points at halftime, but Poland kept the match close for much of the second half. Team USA played again without the injured Smart, and Walker missed the game as well with a neck injury.
