= 2019 United States World Cup team =

2019 United States World Cup team may refer to:

- 2019 United States FIBA Basketball World Cup team
- United States women's national soccer team in the 2019 FIFA Women's World Cup
