= Víctor Álvarez =

Víctor Álvarez may refer to:

- Víctor Álvarez (baseball) (born 1976), Major League Baseball pitcher
- Víctor Álvarez (footballer) (born 1993), Spanish footballer
- Víctor Álvarez (basketball), Mexican basketball player
- Víctor Álvarez González (1901–?), Asturian anarcho-syndicalist
- Power Man (Victor Alvarez), a Marvel Comics superhero
