= Sammis Reyes =

Chilean basketball and gridiron football player (born 1995)

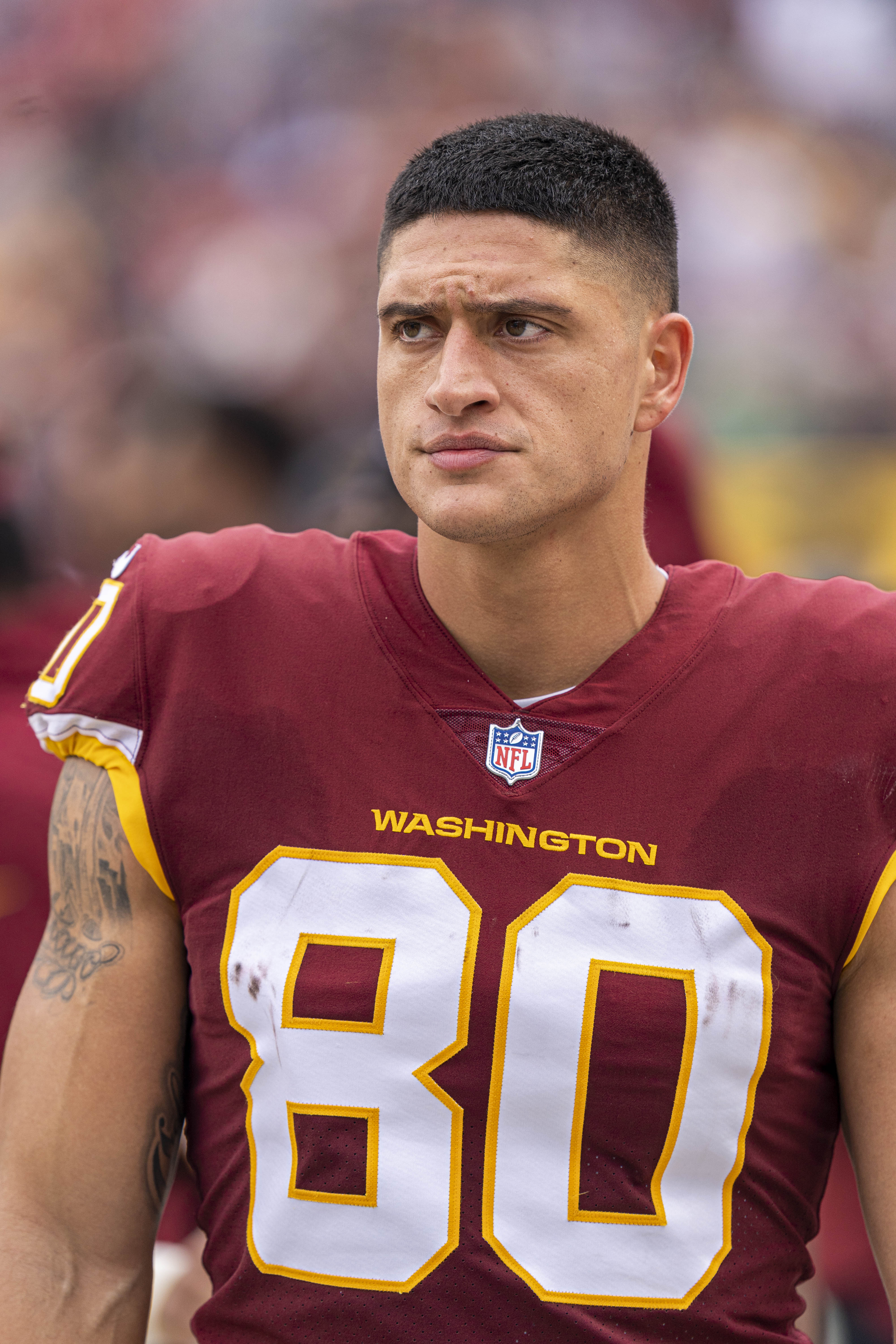
- Reyes with the Washington Football Team in 2021

Profile
- Position: Tight end

Personal information
- Born: October 19, 1995 (age 31); Talcahuano, Chile
- Listed height: 6 ft 6 in (1.98 m)
- Listed weight: 260 lb (118 kg)

Career information
- High school: North Broward (Coconut Creek, Florida, U.S.)
- College: Tulane (2016–2017); Loyola–New Orleans (2018)
- NFL draft: 2019: undrafted
- CFL draft: 2021G: 4th round, 34th overall pick

Career history
- Washington Football Team (2021); Chicago Bears (2022)*; Jacksonville Jaguars (2023)*; Minnesota Vikings (2024)*
- * Offseason or practice squad member only

Career NFL statistics
- Games played: 11
- Games started: 1
- Tackles: 2
- Stats at Pro Football Reference

Sammis Daniel Reyes Martel (born October 19, 1995) is a Chilean professional football player and former basketball player. The first person from Chile to play in the National Football League (NFL), Reyes was a youth member of Chile men's national basketball team before moving to the United States on an athletic scholarship at 14. He played college basketball for the Hawaii Rainbow Warriors, Palm Beach Panthers, Tulane Green Wave, and Loyola Wolf Pack.

Despite being a student in the United States, Reyes continued to play with the Chile national team before deciding to switch to football after failing to qualify for the 2019 FIBA Basketball World Cup. A tight end, he joined the NFL's International Player Pathway (IPP) program in 2021 and signed with the Washington Football Team that season, making a few game appearances on special teams before being released the following year due to injuries. Reyes has also been a member of the NFL's Chicago Bears, Jacksonville Jaguars, and Minnesota Vikings.

== Personal life ==
Sammis Daniel Reyes Martel was born on October 19, 1995, in Talcahuano, a port city in the Greater Concepción metropolitan area of Chile. His family moved to Santiago shortly after, where Reyes grew up playing soccer and basketball. At the age of nine he joined the Boston College Sports Club, a member of the Liga Nacional de Básquetbol de Chile, prior to being recruited to join the Chile national basketball team two years later. He was a member of the Boston College team that were runners-up of the 2014 Campioni del Domani, a Chilean youth basketball tournament.

While on a US tour with the Chilean youth national team in 2010, Reyes was scouted by American recruiters and offered a scholarship to attend Westlake Prep, a school in the Miami metropolitan area. He accepted and left Chile by himself at age 14 to attend the following year. He arrived knowing almost no English and had to quickly learn it, which he did through exposure from film and music. During this time he met and befriended Alex Rifkind, the son of music entrepreneur Steve Rifkind, while playing together in an Amateur Athletic Union basketball circuit. Reyes eventually moved in with the Rifkinds and transferred to North Broward Preparatory School in Coconut Creek, Florida, after briefly attending Saint Andrews School in Boca Raton due to Westlake Prep shutting down.

Reyes graduated from Tulane's Freeman School of Business with a degree in business management before playing his final year of collegiate eligibility for the Loyola Wolf Pack at Loyola University New Orleans in 2018, where he also graduated with a Master of Business Administration degree. In addition to college basketball, he still participated with the Chile national team in international events such as the 2011 FIBA Americas Under-16 Championship and the 2019 FIBA Basketball World Cup qualifiers. He primarily played the power forward position throughout his basketball career.

Reyes appeared in a 2021 Chilean advertisement for Pepsi Zero.

== College basketball career ==
Reyes signed a National Letter of Intent to play college basketball at the University of Hawaii in 2014 but suffered a hand injury while practicing with them that forced him to miss his freshman season. Later feeling homesick and disapproving with the school's decision to fire head coach Gib Arnold mid-season, he dropped out and returned to Florida to recover from his injuries. Reyes then attended a semester at Palm Beach State College and played with their basketball team before transferring to Tulane University in 2016. He spent two seasons with the Tulane Green Wave but played in just two games in 2017 after opting out due to being unhappy with his playing time.

Reyes ended his basketball career after Chile failed to qualify for the 2019 FIBA World Cup and began working as an athletic trainer until social distancing regulations arising from the COVID-19 pandemic in 2020 prevented him from continuing. He then worked as a driver for DoorDash before deciding to become a professional American football player. Reyes had been advised by several teammates and coaches to play the sport since first arriving in the United States, with him only trying it out for a week in high school before stopping as he believed the higher risk of injury would hinder his chances at making an NBA roster.

In addition to college basketball, he still participated with the Chile national team in international events such as the 2011 FIBA Americas Under-16 Championship He primarily played the power forward position throughout his basketball career.

== Professional American football career ==
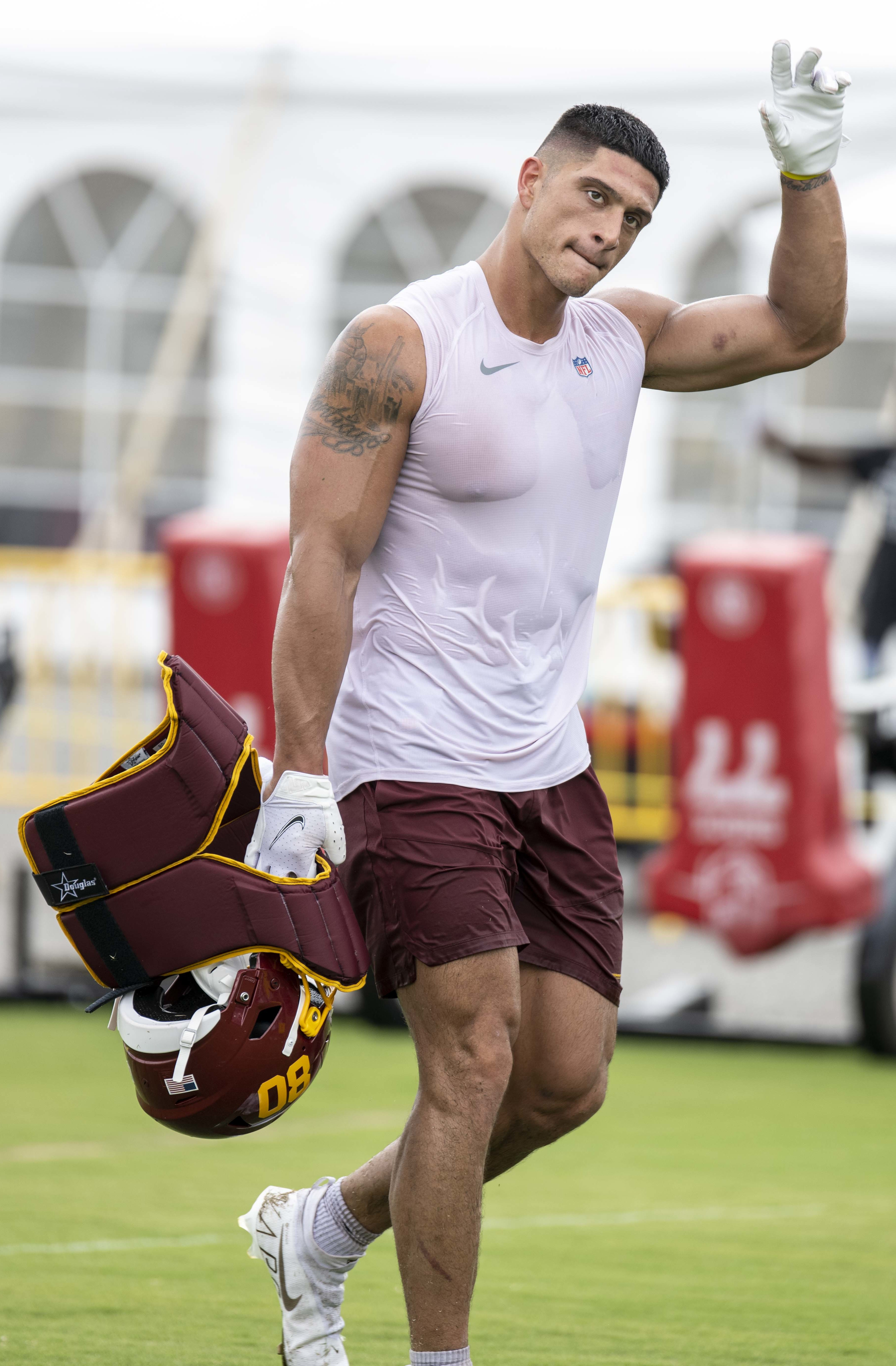
Reyes during practice with the Washington Football Team in 2021

Pre-draft measurables
Height	Weight	40-yard dash	Vertical jump	Broad jump	Bench press
6 ft 5 3/8 in (1.97 m)	260 lb (118 kg)	4.65 s	40 in (1.02 m)	10 ft 5 in (3.18 m)	31 reps
All values from the University of Florida's Pro Day

=== Washington Football Team/Commanders ===
Despite knowing nearly nothing about football, Reyes applied for and was accepted into the National Football League's (NFL) International Player Pathway Program (IPPP) as a tight end prospect. He spent 10 weeks training and learning the sport at IMG Academy in Bradenton before participating alongside other IPPP players at the University of Florida's Pro Day on March 31, 2021. He received interest from several NFL teams there due to his athletic performance before accepting a three-year contract from the Washington Football Team on April 13, 2021, citing his residency in the Washington metropolitan area and his fit with the team's culture. Reyes became the first Chilean-born player in the NFL upon the signing. He was also selected by the Toronto Argonauts 34th overall in the 2021 CFL global draft but never signed a contract with the team.

Reyes made his professional debut against the New Orleans Saints in October 2021, where he played a limited number of snaps on special teams. He spent a week on the team's COVID-19 reserve list alongside several other players in December 2021. He finished the season playing in 11 games, primarily on special teams, where he recorded two tackles. During training camp for the 2022 season, Reyes suffered a hamstring injury and was placed on the injured reserve list before being released by the team with an injury settlement on August 23, 2022.

=== Chicago Bears ===
On October 18, 2022, Reyes signed with the Chicago Bears' practice squad. The Bears briefly attempted to convert Reyes to a defensive lineman.

=== Jacksonville Jaguars ===
On May 16, 2023, Reyes signed with the Jacksonville Jaguars. On August 14, Reyes announced his retirement from professional football through his Instagram account. He said that he decided to retire because he suffered a concussion. Reyes stated his desire to return to football on February 28, 2024, and was waived by the Jaguars.

=== Minnesota Vikings ===
On May 13, 2024, Reyes signed with the Minnesota Vikings through the International Player Pathway Program (IPPP). He was waived on August 26, 2024, and signed to the practice squad two days later.
