= Estadio Superdomo de La Rioja =

Superdomo de La Rioja
- Superdomo
- Interactive map of Superdomo de La Rioja
- Full name: Estadio Superdomo de La Rioja
- Location: La Rioja, La Rioja Province, Argentina
- Coordinates: 29.44065°S 66.89345°W
- Capacity: Concerts: 13,000; Basketball: 11,000
- Surface: 8,330 m2

Construction
- Groundbreaking: 2014
- Opened: 10 December 2015
- Architect: Alba Bustos

Tenant
- La Rioja Province

The Estadio Superdomo de La Rioja is a multi-purpose indoor arena that is located in La Rioja, La Rioja Province, Argentina. The arena has a seating capacity of 13,000 people for concerts, and 11,000 people for basketball games. The arena can host numerous types of events, such as sports, cultural and musical shows, and public performances. It also features parking for 8,000 vehicles.

== History ==
The Superdomo opened on December 10, 2015. The arena was used to host home games of the senior men's Argentine national basketball team, during 2019 FIBA World Cup Americas qualifiers.

== See also ==
- List of indoor arenas in Argentina
