= Jorge Díaz (basketball) =

Puerto Rican basketball player

No. 11 – Capitanes de Arecibo
- Position: Center
- League: Baloncesto Superior Nacional

Personal information
- Born: November 13, 1989 (age 37) Bronx, New York, U.S.
- Listed height: 6 ft 11 in (2.11 m)
- Listed weight: 245 lb (111 kg)

Career information
- High school: Colegio Bautista de Caguas
- College: Nebraska (2009–2012)
- Playing career: 2012–present

Career history
- 2012–2015: Piratas de Quebradillas
- 2015–2016: Hebraica y Macabi
- 2016–2017: Bahía Basket
- 2017–2021: Piratas de Quebradillas
- 2021–2025: Atléticos de San Germán
- 2025–2026: Criollos de Caguas
- 2026–present: Capitanes de Arecibo
Medals
Men's basketball
Representing Puerto Rico
Centrobasket
| Gold medal – first place | 2016 Panama |
Central American and Caribbean Games
| Gold medal – first place | 2018 Barranquilla |

Jorge Bryan Díaz (born November 13, 1989) is a Puerto Rican professional basketball player for the Capitanes de Arecibo of the Baloncesto Superior Nacional (BSN). He represented the Puerto Rican national team internationally.

== Early years ==
Jorge Bryan Díaz was born in Bronx, N.Y., USA to a Puerto Rican mother, Nilda Hernandez, and an Ecuatorian father, Jorge Diaz. He has one sister, Natalie Diaz. When he was 4 years old his family moved to Caguas, Puerto Rico. He played in High School with Colegio Bautista de Caguas for Coach Leonel Arill. He averaged about 17 points, 10 rebounds and three blocked shots per game in 2007-08 under Arill, who helped Diaz and the Caguas team to a national title in 2006. Diaz has also played on the Puerto Rican Under-19 National Team, traveling to many international tournaments, including playing in Serbia in 2007, where he was first seen by the Nebraska coaching staff.

On January 17, 2009, he joined the Nebraska basketball team, the Nebraska Huskers where he also majored in Spanish. As a player, he has been battling foot injuries many times. For instance in 2012 as a Husker junior, he would have ranked second in the Big Ten in blocked shots per game, but did not play in enough games to qualify for league rankings because of said injuries.

== International career ==
Díaz has participated in several FIBA tournaments representing Puerto Rico. At present, he is the tallest center of the Puerto Rico squad.

== Career statistics ==
=== College ===
| Season | Team | League | GP | MPG | FG% | 3P% | FT% | RPG | APG | SPG | BPG | PPG |
|---|---|---|---|---|---|---|---|---|---|---|---|---|
| 2011/12 | Nebraska Cornhuskers | NCAA I | 16 | 27.3 | .471 | -- | .667 | 4.3 | 0.6 | 0.4 | 1.9 | 8.6 |
| 2010/11 | Nebraska Cornhuskers | NCAA I | 32 | 26.3 | .538 | -- | .514 | 4.4 | 1.0 | 0.5 | 1.2 | 10.5 |
| 2009/10 | Nebraska Cornhuskers | NCAA I | 39 | 23.7 | .522 | -- | .490 | 4.0 | 1.0 | 0.5 | 1.2 | 8.8 |

=== National team ===
| Competition | Year | GP | MPG | 2P% | 3P% | FT% | RPG | APG | PPG | BPG |
|---|---|---|---|---|---|---|---|---|---|---|
| 2015 FIBA Americas Championship | 2015 | 4 | 24.5 | .571 | .000 | .500 | 4.3 | 1.5 | 7.0 | -- |
| 2015 Marchand Continental Championship Cup | 2015 | 3 | 18 | .450 | .333 | .500 | 4.7 | 0.0 | 7.7 | -- |
| 2014 FIBA Basketball World Cup | 2014 | 4 | 9.2 | .200 | .000 | .000 | 2.5 | 0.0 | 1.0 | -- |
