= Javier Justiz =

Cuban basketball player (born 1992)

No. 20 – Libertadores de Querétaro
- Position: Center
- League: LNBP

Personal information
- Born: September 18, 1992 (age 34) Santiago de Cuba, Cuba
- Listed height: 6 ft 11 in (2.11 m)
- Listed weight: 270 lb (122 kg)

Career information
- NBA draft: 2014: undrafted
- Playing career: 2012–present

Career history
- 2012–2015: Santiago de Cuba
- 2015: Bucaneros de La Guaira
- 2015–2017: Estudiantes Concordia
- 2017–2018: San Lorenzo
- 2018–2021: Basket Zaragoza
- 2022–present: Libertadores de Querétaro

Career highlights
- FIBA Americas League champion (2018); Argentine League Best Quintet (2017)

Javier Justiz Ferrer (born September 18, 1992) is a Cuban professional basketball player for Libertadores de Querétaro of the Liga Nacional de Baloncesto Profesional (LNBP). He has earlier spent three seasons with Basket Zaragoza of the Liga ACB in Spain.

== Professional career ==
On August 6, 2018, Justiz signed a two-year deal with Casademont Zaragoza of the Liga ACB. He averaged 8.2 points and 4.7 rebounds per game during the 2019–20 season. On August 6, 2020, Justiz signed a three-year extension with the team.

== National team career ==
Justiz represented the senior Cuban national basketball team at the 2015 FIBA AmeriCup, and at the 2016 Centrobasket, where he recorded the most minutes played, points scored, rebounds and blocks for his team.
