= Karel Guzmán =

Cuban basketball player

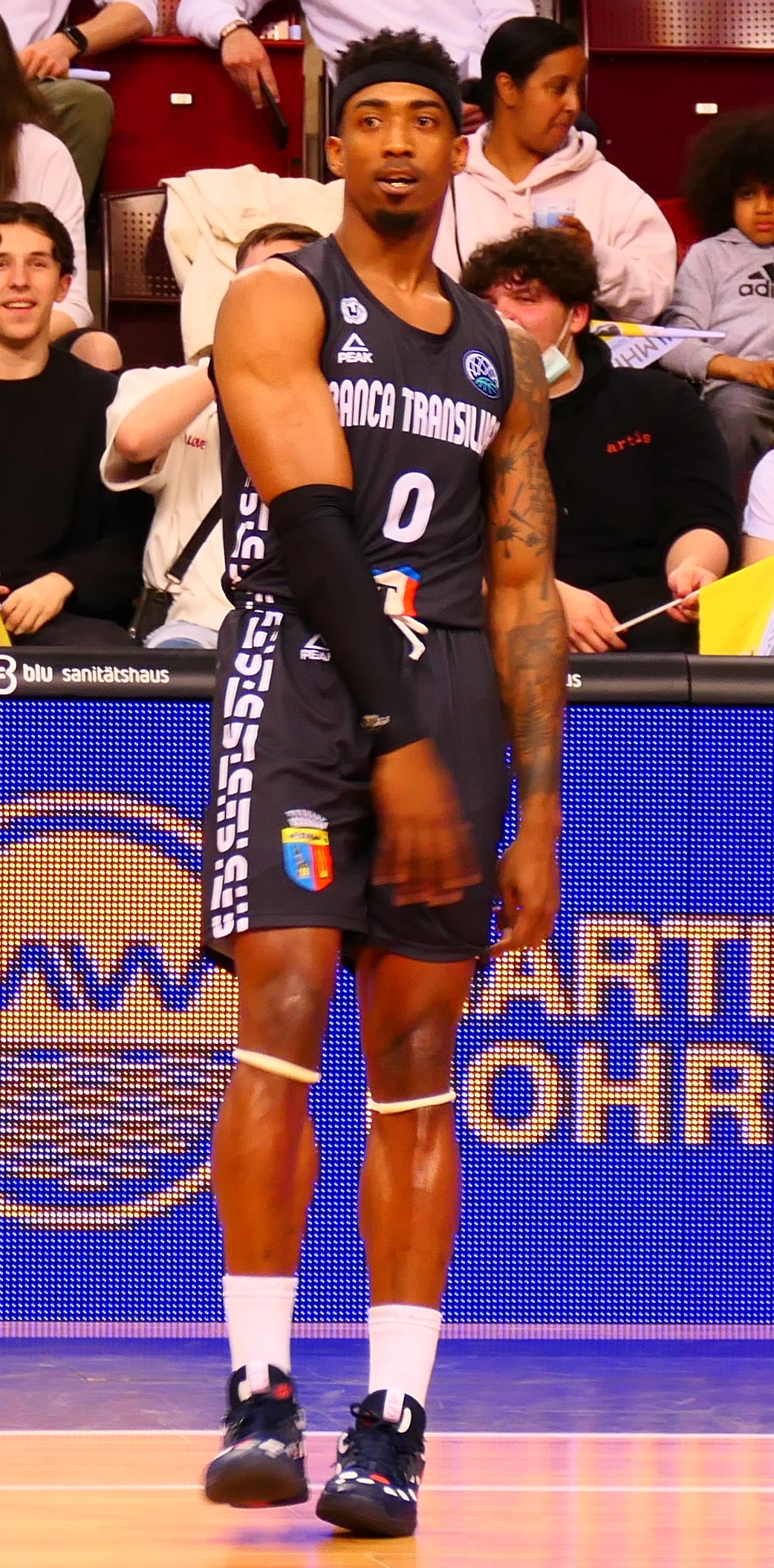
- Guzmán with U-BT Cluj-Napoca in 2022

No. 0 – Hapoel HaEmek
- Position: Small Forward
- League: Israeli Basketball Premier League

Personal information
- Born: 7 February 1995 (age 31) Havana, Cuba
- Listed height: 1.88 m (6 ft 2 in)

Career information
- Playing career: 2015–present

Career history
- 2015–2017: Capitalinos de la Habana
- 2017–2018: Ciclista Juninense
- 2018–2020: Ciclista Olímpico
- 2020–2026: U-BT Cluj-Napoca
- 2026–present: Hapoel HaEmek

Career highlights
- 6× Romanian League champion (2021–2026); 3× Romanian Supercup champion (2021, 2022, 2025); 3× Romanian Cup champion (2023, 2024, 2026)

Karel Guzmán Abreu (born 7 February 1995) is a Cuban professional basketball player for Hapoel HaEmek of the Israeli Basketball Premier League.

== Professional career ==
In mid-2017, Guzmán joined Ciclista Juninense, a second-tier team in Argentina. In April 2018, he transferred to the first-tier team Ciclista Olímpico where he originally signed for three seasons.

In the 2018–19 Liga Nacional de Básquet season, as a starter, Guzmán played in 23 matches. He finished 6th in the league in total defensive rebounds (130), and second in 2 point field goal percentage with 70.4. In addition, his 298 total points allowed him to finish second-best scorer of his team (surpassed by his Panamaian teammate Trevor Gaskins who got 377), he was the leader in total rebounds (152) and got 35 assists and 47 triples in 119 shots.

== Personal ==
Guzmán is left-handed.

== Cuban national team ==
Guzmán has been a member of the Cuban national basketball team.
