= Reggie Hearn =

American basketball player (born 1991)

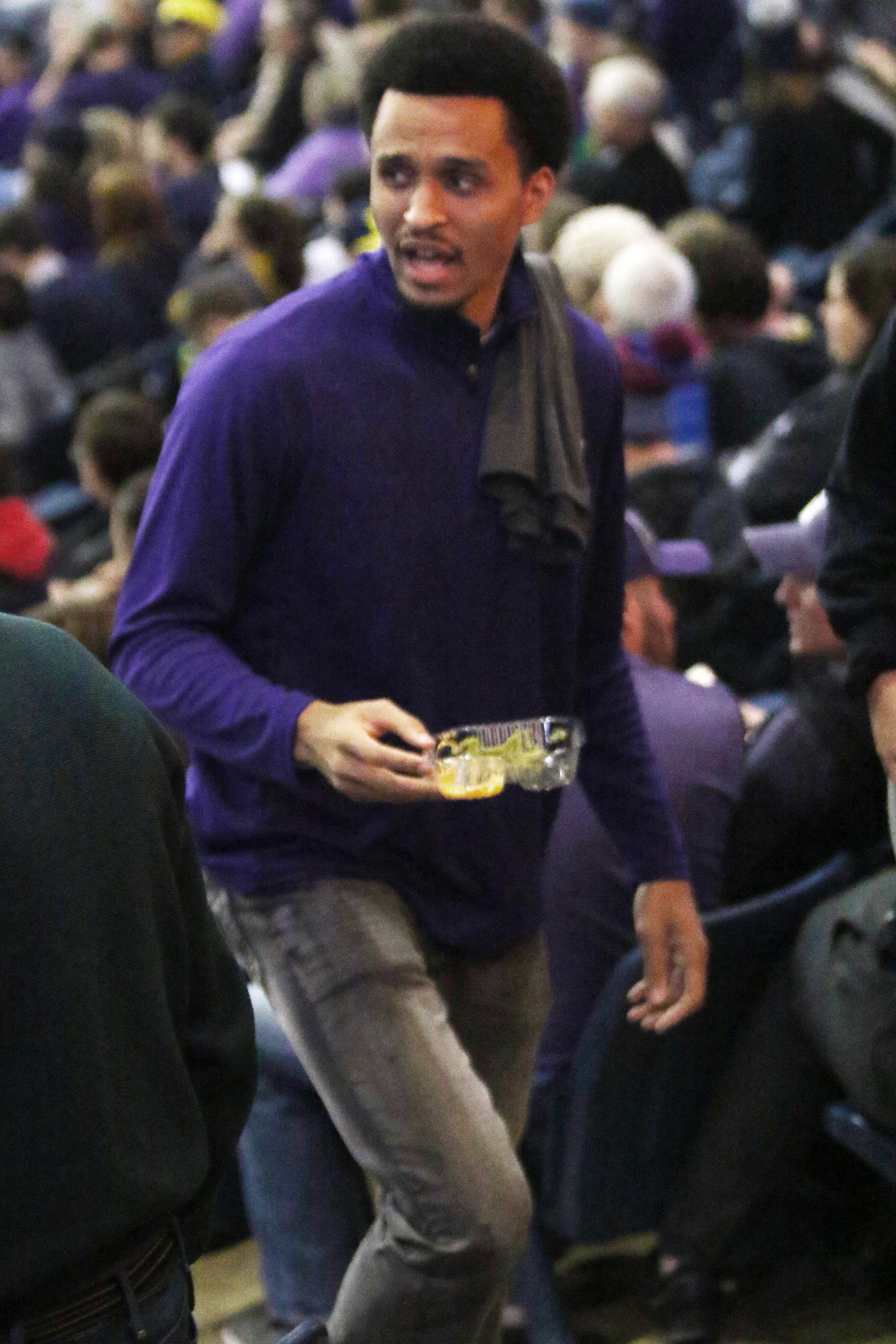
- Hearn in 2018

Personal information
- Born: August 14, 1991 (age 35) Fort Wayne, Indiana, U.S.
- Listed height: 6 ft 5 in (1.96 m)
- Listed weight: 210 lb (95 kg)

Career information
- High school: Snider (Fort Wayne, Indiana)
- College: Northwestern (2009–2013)
- NBA draft: 2013: undrafted
- Playing career: 2013–2022
- Position: Shooting guard
- Number: 38

Career history
- 2013–2014: Idaho Stampede
- 2014–2018: Reno Bighorns
- 2018: Detroit Pistons
- 2018: →Grand Rapids Drive
- 2018–2019: Stockton Kings
- 2019–2020: South Bay Lakers
- 2021: NBA G League Ignite
- 2021–2022: Memphis Hustle

Career highlights
- USA Basketball Male Athlete of the Year (2018)
- Stats at NBA.com
- Stats at Basketball Reference
Medals
Men's basketball
Representing United States
FIBA AmeriCup
Gold medal – first place	2017 Argentina

Reggie Christian Hearn (born August 14, 1991) is an American former professional basketball player and current scout for the San Antonio Spurs of the National Basketball Association (NBA). He played college basketball for the Northwestern Wildcats.

== High school ==
Hearn was an undersized post player while at R. Nelson Snider High School, in Fort Wayne, Indiana, and he was lightly recruited by college programs and receive no D-1 scholarship offers.

== College career ==
Hearn landed as a walk-on at Northwestern, for head coach Bill Carmody, on a recommendation from Princeton head coach Mitch Henderson. He ultimately earned a scholarship, and became a standout player for the team, by his junior season. As a senior, in the 2012–13 season, Hearn averaged 13.4 points and 4.6 rebounds per game, earning Honorable Mention All-Big Ten Conference.

== Professional career ==
=== Idaho Stampede (2013–2014) ===
Following his college basketball career, Hearn joined the Idaho Stampede of the NBA Development League (now called the NBA G League).

=== Reno Bighorns (2014–2018) ===
Hearn played for the Stampede for a full season, and part of another, before being traded to the Westchester Knicks, and ultimately landing with the Reno Bighorns. With the Bighorns, he earned a reputation of one of the G League's top three-point shooters.

During the 2016–17 season, Hearn was selected to compete in the three-point contest at the 2017 NBA Development League All-Star Game.

On October 10, 2017, Hearn was signed by the Sacramento Kings to a training camp deal.

=== Detroit Pistons (2018) ===
On January 15, 2018, Hearn signed a one-year, two-way contract with the Detroit Pistons. Hearn made his NBA debut on February 5, playing 2:33 in a 111–91 win against the Portland Trail Blazers and making a three point field goal. The points were the first NBA points by a former Northwestern Wildcat since Geno Carlisle in December 2004, the first by a Northwestern graduate since Evan Eschmeyer in the May 2003 and the first NBA three point shot by a Wildcat since Rex Walters in the January 2000 and the first by a Northwestern graduate since Billy McKinney in 1981. Hearn appeared in a total of three games for the Pistons, but did not score again during the season.

=== Stockton Kings (2018–2019) ===
For the 2018–19 season, Hearn joined the Stockton Kings of the G League.

=== South Bay Lakers (2019–2020) ===
For the 2019–20 season, Hearn joined the South Bay Lakers of the G League. He posted 23 points, four rebounds, five assists, one steal and a block during a win against the Iowa Wolves on February 25, 2020. Hearn averaged 12.6 points and 3.4 rebounds per game.

=== NBA G League Ignite (2020–2021) ===
In October 2020, Hearn signed with the NBA G League Ignite as one of the veteran players to mentor younger prospects. He averaged 3.9 points and 2.6 rebounds in 13 games.

=== Memphis Hustle (2021–2022) ===
On August 25, 2021, Hearn signed with Fraport Skyliners of the easyCredit BBL. However, on September 16, he parted ways with the team without playing a single game. On October 23, he signed with the Memphis Hustle.

== National team career ==
In 2017, Hearn was selected to the U.S. national team competing at the 2017 FIBA AmeriCup, where he won a gold medal.

Hearn returned to team USA in 2018, playing on two World Cup qualifying teams. In five qualifying games, he averaged 12.2 points and 4.2 rebounds, while shooting 64% from three-point range. For his efforts, Hearn was named the 2018 USA Basketball Male Athlete of the Year.

== Post-playing career ==
Hearn retired in 2022, joining the San Antonio Spurs as a scout.

== Career statistics ==
Legend
GP	Games played	GS	Games started	MPG	Minutes per game
FG%	Field goal percentage	3P%	3-point field goal percentage	FT%	Free throw percentage
RPG	Rebounds per game	APG	Assists per game	SPG	Steals per game
BPG	Blocks per game	PPG	Points per game	**Bold**	Career high

=== NBA ===
==== Regular season ====
Year	Team	GP	GS	MPG	FG%	3P%	FT%	RPG	APG	SPG	BPG	PPG
2017–18	Detroit	3	0	2.3	.500	.500	.000	0.0	0.0	0.0	0.0	1.0
Career		3	0	2.3	.500	.500	.000	0.0	0.0	0.0	0.0	1.0

=== College ===
Year	Team	GP	GS	MPG	FG%	3P%	FT%	RPG	APG	SPG	BPG	PPG
2009–10	Northwestern	13	0	1.9	**.500**	**.500**	–	.2	.2	.0	.0	.4
2010–11	Northwestern	19	0	2.5	.385	.333	**.875**	.2	.2	.1	.1	1.0
2011–12	Northwestern	**33**	**33**	26.1	.486	.371	.787	3.7	1.3	.7	.3	7.4
2012–13	Northwestern	30	30	**33.0**	.441	.336	.735	**4.6**	**1.5**	**1.2**	**.4**	**13.4**
Career		95	63	20.2	.457	.353	.752	2.8	1.0	.6	.2	7.1
