= Víctor Álvarez (basketball) =

Mexican basketball player (born 1996)

No. 14 – Gambusinos de Fresnillo
- Position: Point guard
- League: Liga Nacional de Baloncesto Profesional

Personal information
- Born: 14 July 1996 (age 30) Nogales, Sonora, Mexico
- Listed height: 6 ft 0 in (1.83 m)
- Listed weight: 180 lb (82 kg)

Career information
- College: Centro de Estudios Universitarios
- Playing career: 2018–present

Career history
- 2018–2020: Soles de Mexicali
- 2021: Dorados de Chihuahua
- 2022: Ostioneros de Guaymas
- 2022–2023: Soles de Mexicali
- 2024: Trotamundos de Carabobo
- 2024: Soles de Mexicali
- 2025: Dorados de Chihuahua
- 2025: Soles de Mexicali
- 2026: Astros de Jalisco
- 2026–present: Gambusinos de Fresnillo

Víctor Ramón Álvarez Diez (born 14 July 1996) is a Mexican professional basketball player for the Astros de Jalisco of the CIBACOPA.

== Career ==
Álvarez made his debut in the 2018 season with the Soles de Mexicali to play in the LNBP. In the season 2021 and 2025 he played with Dorados de Chihuahua. In 2022 he played with Ostioneros de Guaymas in the CIBACOPA. In 2024 he signed with Trotamundos de Carabobo.

== National team career ==
In 2023, he was a member of the Mexican national team that participated in the 2023 Pan American Games.
