= Marco Ramos (basketball) =

Mexican basketball player (born 1987)

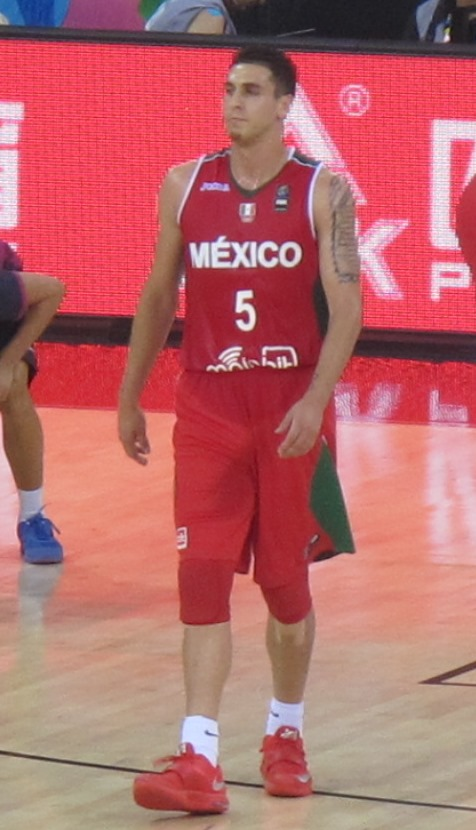

No. 99 – Mineros de Zacatecas
- Position: Shooting guard / small forward
- League: LNBP

Personal information
- Born: February 27, 1987 (age 39) Chavinda, Michoacán, Mexico
- Listed height: 6 ft 6 in (1.98 m)
- Listed weight: 210 lb (95 kg)

Career information
- High school: North Salinas (Salinas, California)
- College: Monterey Peninsula College (2005–2007); Weber State (2008–2009)
- Playing career: 2010–present

Career history
- 2010–2016: Halcones Rojos Veracruz
- 2016–2018: Toros de Nuevo Laredo
- 2018–2019: Abejas de León
- 2020–2022: Astros de Jalisco
- 2022–present: Mineros de Zacatecas
- 2023: Dorados de Chihuahua
- 2025–present: Soles de Ojinaga

Marco Antonio Ramos Esquivel (born 26 February 1987) is a Mexican professional basketball player, who plays the shooting guard and small forward positions for the Dorados de Chihuahua of the Liga Nacional de Baloncesto Profesional (LNBP). He also competes internationally for the national basketball team of Mexico, with which he participated at the 2014 FIBA Basketball World Cup.

== FIBA COCABA Championship ==
- FIBA COCABA Championship 2013 Gold Medal
