= David Huertas =

Puerto Rican basketball player (born 1987)

No. 39 – Cangrejeros de Santurce
- Position: Shooting guard / small forward
- League: Baloncesto Superior Nacional

Personal information
- Born: June 2, 1987 (age 39) Humacao, Puerto Rico
- Listed height: 6 ft 5 in (1.96 m)
- Listed weight: 200 lb (91 kg)

Career information
- High school: Colegio Bautista; Miami Christian School; Arlington Country Day School
- College: Florida (2005–2006); Ole Miss (2007–2009)
- NBA draft: 2009: undrafted
- Playing career: 2009–present

Career history
- 2002: Criollos de Caguas
- 2009–2014: Piratas de Quebradillas
- 2009–2010: Fos Ouest Provence Basket
- 2010–2011: Maroussi B.C.
- 2012: Metros de Santiago
- 2012: Obras Sanitarias
- 2012–2013: Panteras de Aguascalientes
- 2013–2015: Halcones Rojos Veracruz
- 2015–2016: Capitanes de Arecibo
- 2016–2017: Hapoel Haifa
- 2017–2018: Comunicaciones Mercedes
- 2018–2021: Fuerza Regia de Monterrey
- 2021–2023: Capitanes de Arecibo
- 2023–2025: Gigantes de Carolina
- 2024: Panteras de Aguascalientes
- 2026–present: Cangrejeros de Santurce

Career highlights
- 4× BSN champion (2013, 2016, 2018, 2021); 2x LNBP champion (2019, 2020); NCAA champion (2006); Second-team All-SEC (2009)
Medals
Men's basketball
Representing Puerto Rico
Centrobasket
| Gold medal – first place | 2010 Santo Domingo | Team competition |
| Gold medal – first place | 2016 Panama | Team competition |
Central American and Caribbean Games
| Gold medal – first place | 2006 Cartagena | Team |

David Huertas (born June 2, 1987) is a Puerto Rican professional basketball player for the Cangrejeros de Santurcs of the Baloncesto Superior Nacional (BSN). He also represents the Puerto Rican national team.

== College career ==
Huertas committed to play NCAA basketball for the Florida Gators after leading his high school, Arlington Country Day in Jacksonville, Florida, to a state championship in his senior year. In his freshman season for the Gators, he saw action in 35 games off the bench, averaging 2.5 points and 1.5 rebounds for the team, en route to the 2006 NCAA Men's Division I Basketball Tournament championship.

Unhappy with his minor role on the team, Huertas transferred to the Ole Miss Rebels after the season. Huertas sat out the 2006–07 season because of NCAA transfer rules. Huertas played for the Rebels in the 2007–08 and 2008–09 seasons, putting up solid numbers as a starting shooting guard. In the 2008–09 season, he was the Rebels' leading scorer, averaging 18.1 points per game while failing to reach double figures only once in thirty games played. His 18.1 points per game was the fourth highest total in the Southeastern Conference. Following the season, Huertas was selected to the All-Conference Second Team.

== Professional career ==
Following his junior season, Huertas made the decision to turn professional, signing with Puerto Rican team Piratas de Quebradillas of the Baloncesto Superior Nacional. He joined the Piratas midseason, helping the team reach the finals, where they fell to the Vaqueros de Bayamon in six games.

With the Puerto Rican season over, Huertas participated in the June 2009 Reebok Eurocamp, impressing many with his shooting accuracy. After this performance, he was signed by French team Fos Ouest Provence Basket of the French ProB League. He averaged 16.1 points per game over 23 games to finish as the league's fifth best scorer.

Huertas then returned to the Piratas for the 2010 season. He averaged 16.1 points per game for the team, leading to them to the league semifinals, where they lost in seven games to eventual champions Capitanes de Arecibo. Huertas signed for newly promoted to the National League Hapoel Haifa in August 2016.

== International career ==
Huertas is also a member of the Puerto Rico national basketball team. He played with the team at the 2006 Central American and Caribbean Games and the 2010 Centrobasket, helping the team win the gold medal at both tournaments. He was selected to the national team roster for the 2010 FIBA World Championship in Turkey — his first major international tournament — after long-time players Christian Dalmau and Larry Ayuso left the team.
