= 2022 Serbia EuroBasket team =

Sports team

Serbia
- Flag of Serbia
- President: Predrag Danilović
- Head coach: Svetislav Pešić
- Preliminary Round: Group D Winner
- Knockout Stage: Round of 16
- PIR leader: Nikola Jokić 31.7
- Scoring leader: Nikola Jokić 21.7
- Rebounding leader: Nikola Jokić 10.0
- Assists leader: Vasilije Micić 7.5
- Biggest win: +30; 100–70 Finland (5 September 2022)
- Biggest defeat: –8; 86–94 Italy (11 September 2022)
- All statistics correct as of 8 September 2022.

The 2022 Serbia EuroBasket team represented Serbia at the EuroBasket 2022 in the Czech Republic, Georgia, Italy, and Germany. Serbia finished at the 9th place with a 5–1 record, following a lost to Italy in a Round of 16 game.

Serbia qualified for the EuroBasket by winning the EuroBasket 2022 qualification Group E. The team is coached by FIBA Hall of Fame coach member Svetislav Pešić, with assistant coaches Oliver Kostić, Marko Marinović, and Saša Kosović.

This will the seventh appearance of Serbia at the EuroBasket as an independent state; its best results are second places in 2009 and 2017.

== Timeline ==
- 12 July 2022: 22-man roster announced
- 1 August: The players gathering in Crowne Plaza, Belgrade
- 3 August: Start of a training camp in Stara Pazova, at the FAS House of Football
- 15 August: The end of the training camp
- 13–20 August: Exhibition games
- 25–28 August: Fourth window of the 2023 FIBA Basketball World Cup qualification
- 31 August: 12-man roster announcement
- 1 September: Departure of the team to Prague, Czech Republic
- 1–18 September: EuroBasket 2022

== Roster ==
On 10 June 2022, it was announced that an NBA guard Bogdan Bogdanović will miss the EuroBasket due to a right knee surgery. It was the first time that Serbia national team plays without Bogdanović at a major tournament since EuroBasket 2011. On 15 June, center Nikola Jokić, who was named the NBA Most Valuable Player Award for the 2021–22 season, has confirmed that he will play at the EuroBasket.

On 12 July 2022, head coach Svetislav Pešić announced a 22-man preliminary roster for the EuroBasket 2022. The 22-man roster includes three NBA players (Nemanja Bjelica, Aleksej Pokuševski, Jokić); then two All-EuroLeague Team members for the 2021–22 season: guard Vasilije Micić and forward Vladimir Lučić; as well as seven domestic league players. Furthermore, the roster includes three high-profile-leagues MVPs for the 2021–22 season: Jokić (NBA), Micić (EuroLeague Final Four MVP), and Miloš Teodosić (EuroCup Finals MVP).

The initial 22-man roster excluded NBA center Boban Marjanović and EuroLeague guard Danilo Anđušić. On 14 July, guard Anđušić expressed his disappointment on his cut from the 22-man preliminary roster. Marjanović was not included due to an injury. On 3 August, head coach Pešić announced that NBA players Pokuševski and Nikola Jović are cut from the roster due to disapproval of their clubs, the Oklahoma City Thunder and the Miami Heat respectively. On 8 August, two more players were removed from the rooster, veteran guard and team captain Teodosić due to coach's decision and forward Alen Smailagić due to his long prolonged injury. On 15 August 2022, head coach Pešić, following a cut of Teodosić, announced forwards Bjelica and Lučić as co-captains. Following the Bjelica's cut from the roster due to injury, Lučić became sole team captain.

On 1 September, center Nikola Milutinov was reported injured due to health issues, missing a team departure to Prague. On 5 September, he arrived to Prague. On 7 September, following the Game 4, guard Nemanja Nedović was reported injured and out for the rest of the tournament. Two days later, Nedović left to Madrid, Spain, for a therapy on his injury.

The members of Serbia roster at the 2019 Serbia FIBA Basketball World Cup guards Micić, Marko Gudurić, forward Lučić and centers Jokić and Milutinov are coming back to the EuroBasket roster. Guard Nedović and forward Nikola Kalinić made the first appearance at a major tournament since the 2016 Summer Olympics. Guards Ognjen Jaramaz and Vanja Marinković, forwards Dejan Davidovac and Marko Jagodić-Kuridža, as well as center Dušan Ristić made their debuts at a major tournament. The average height of players in the roster is 2.02 metres (6 ft 8 in). The average age is 29 years old.

The following is the 12-man Serbia roster for the EuroBasket:

The squad was announced on 31 August 2022.

Serbia men's national basketball team – EuroBasket 2022 roster
Players
Coaches

Pos.	No.	Name	Age – Date of birth	Height	Club	Ctr.
SF	7	Dejan Davidovac	27 – 17 January 1995	2.03 m (6 ft 8 in)	Crvena zvezda	(Serbia)
SG	9	Vanja Marinković	25 – 9 January 1997	1.97 m (6 ft 6 in)	Baskonia	(Spain)
F	10	Nikola Kalinić	30 – 8 November 1991	2.02 m (6 ft 8 in)	Crvena zvezda	(Serbia)
F	11	Vladimir Lučić (C)	33 – 17 June 1989	2.04 m (6 ft 8 in)	Bayern Munich	(Germany)
C	14	Dušan Ristić	26 – 27 November 1995	2.13 m (7 ft 0 in)	Fuenlabrada	(Spain)
C	15	Nikola Jokić	27 – 19 February 1995	2.11 m (6 ft 11 in)	Denver Nuggets	(United States)
G	16	Nemanja Nedović (injured)	31 – 16 June 1991	1.91 m (6 ft 3 in)	Panathinaikos	(Greece)
PF	21	Marko Jagodić-Kuridža	35 – 15 May 1987	2.05 m (6 ft 9 in)	Budućnost	(Montenegro)
PG	22	Vasilije Micić	28 – 13 January 1994	1.95 m (6 ft 5 in)	Anadolu Efes	(Turkey)
G	23	Marko Gudurić	27 – 8 March 1995	1.97 m (6 ft 6 in)	Fenerbahçe	(Turkey)
PG	25	Ognjen Jaramaz	27 – 1 September 1995	1.92 m (6 ft 4 in)	Bayern Munich	(Germany)
C	33	Nikola Milutinov	27 – 30 December 1994	2.13 m (7 ft 0 in)	CSKA Moscow	(Russia)

Head coach

- (Serbia) Svetislav Pešić

Assistant coach(es)

- (Serbia) Oliver Kostić
- (Serbia) Marko Marinović
- (Serbia) Saša Kosović

Legend

- (C) Team captain
- Club – describes last club
  before the tournament
- Age – describes age
  on 1 September 2022

=== Depth chart ===
Pos.	Starting 5	Bench 1	Bench 2
C	Nikola Jokić	Nikola Milutinov	Dušan Ristić
PF	Vladimir Lučić	Marko Jagodić-Kuridža
SF	Nikola Kalinić	Dejan Davidovac
SG	Vanja Marinković	Marko Gudurić	Nemanja Nedović
PG	Vasilije Micić	Ognjen Jaramaz

=== Earlier candidates ===
The following were candidates to make the team:

Player	Team (Note: Describes the last club before the tournament.)	Added	Removed	Reason
Nikola Jović	(Serbia) Mega	12 July 2022	3 August 2022	Withdrawn
Aleksej Pokuševski	(United States) Oklahoma City Thunder	12 July 2022	3 August 2022	Withdrawn
Miloš Teodosić	(Italy) Virtus Bologna	12 July 2022	8 August 2022	Roster cut
Alen Smailagić	(Serbia) Partizan	12 July 2022	8 August 2022	Injured
Aleksa Avramović	(Serbia) Partizan	12 July 2022	22 August 2022	Injured
Balša Koprivica	(Serbia) Partizan	12 July 2022	22 August 2022	Roster cut
Nemanja Bjelica	(United States) Golden State Warriors	12 July 2022	31 August 2022	Injured
Filip Petrušev	(Turkey) Anadolu Efes	12 July 2022	31 August 2022	12-man roster cut
Ognjen Dobrić	(Serbia) Crvena Zvezda	12 July 2022	31 August 2022	12-man roster cut
Boriša Simanić	(Serbia) Mega	12 July 2022	31 August 2022	12-man roster cut

== Staff ==
Head coach Pešić won two EuroBasket editions, with Germany in 1993 and with FR Yugoslavia in 2001. He was introduced to the FIBA Hall of Fame as coach in 2020.

Position	Staff Member	Age	Affiliated Club
Head coach	Svetislav Pešić	73	None
Assistant coaches	Oliver Kostić	49	None
Assistant coaches	Marko Marinović	38	(Serbia) Borac Čačak
Assistant coaches	Saša Kosović	43	None
Conditioning coach	Marko Sekulić	42	(Serbia) Mega MIS
Conditioning coach	Marko Stanojević	—N/a	None
Scout	Nenad Jakovljević	33	(Serbia) Crvena zvezda mts
National team director	Dragan Tarlać	49	None
Team manager	Nebojša Ilić	54	(Serbia) Crvena zvezda mts
Physicians	Dragan Radovanović	—N/a	None
Physicians	Milan Mirković	—N/a	None
Physiotherapist	Dušan Sajić	—N/a	None
Equipment manager	Jovica Aničić	—N/a	None
Press officer	Ivan Ivković	—N/a	None

Age – describes age on 1 September 2022

== Uniform ==
- Supplier: Peak
- Main sponsor: Triglav
- Back sponsor: Raiffeisen Bank (below number)
- Shorts sponsor: mts

Home	Away

== Exhibition games ==
Serbia is scheduled to play four exhibition games prior to the EuroBasket tournament, excluding two games of the 2023 FIBA Basketball World Cup qualification, against Greece on 25 August and Turkey on 28 August 2022. The team is scheduled to play at the 2022 Supercup Hamburg tournament together with Germany, Italy, and the Czech Republic from 19 to 20 August 2022. On 26 July, it was announced that Serbia will go to play against Slovenia on 17 August in Ljubljana. The match with Montenegro on 13 August in Belgrade was played behind closed doors and it started with a moment of silence for the victims of Cetinje shooting from the day before. On 20 August, Serbia won the 2022 DBB SuperCup following an 83–56 win over Germany.

13 August 2022
not available

Report 1
Report 2

Serbia	82–73	Montenegro
Scoring by quarter: 14–23, 27–11, 24–20, 17–19
Pts: Nikola Jokić 16; Rebs: not available Asts: not available		Pts: Simonović, Dubljević 17 each Rebs: not available Asts: not available

Štark Arena, Belgrade
Attendance: None
Referees: not available

17 August 2022
20:15

Report
Boxscore

Slovenia	97–92 (OT)	Serbia
Scoring by quarter: 17–21, 28–21, 22–23, 19–21, Overtime: 11–6
Pts: Luka Dončić 34; Rebs: Mike Tobey 9 Asts: Luka Dončić 9		Pts: Nikola Jokić 26; Rebs: Nikola Jokić 12; Asts: Vasilije Micić 8

Arena Stožice, Ljubljana
Attendance: 12,000
Referees: Sašo Petek, Goran Grbić, Domen Krajnc

DBB Supercup Hamburg

19 August 2022
18:00

Report
Boxscore

Italy	86–90	Serbia
Scoring by quarter: 23–24, 30–20, 19–21, 14–25
Pts: Simone Fontecchio 25; Rebs: Melli, Ricci 7 each Asts: Marco Spissu 5		Pts: Nikola Jokić 18; Rebs: Nikola Jokić 10; Asts: Nikola Jokić 5

Barclays Arena, Hamburg
Attendance: not available
Referees: Zulfikar Oruzgani, Anastasios Kardaris, Armin Mutapčić

20 August 2022
18:30

Boxscore

Serbia	83–56	Germany
Scoring by quarter: 24–13, 14–18, 27–10, 18–15
Pts: Nikola Jokić 22; Rebs: Nikola Milutinov 7 Asts: Vasilije Micić 4		Pts: Andreas Obst 12; Rebs: Johannes Voigtmann 4 Asts: Hollatz, Weiler-Babb 3 each

Barclays Arena, Hamburg
Attendance: not available
Referees: Marek Kúkelčík, Franko Gracin, Anastasios Kardaris

2023 FIBA Basketball World Cup qualification, Group I

25 August 2022
20:00

Report

Serbia	100–94 (OT)	Greece
Scoring by quarter: 31–25, 20–19, 19–19, 17–24, Overtime: 13–7
Pts: Nikola Jokić 29; Rebs: Nikola Jokić 8 Asts: Nikola Kalinić 7		Pts: Giannis Antetokounmpo 40; Rebs: Giannis Antetokounmpo 8 Asts: Nick Calathes 8

Štark Arena, Belgrade
Attendance: 19,150
Referees: Manuel Mazzoni, Wojciech Liszka, Luis Castillo

28 August 2022
19:00

Report

Turkey	72–79	Serbia
Scoring by quarter: 11–26, 17–21, 27–18, 17–14
Pts: Cedi Osman 22; Rebs: Alperen Şengün 13; Asts: Shane Larkin 9		Pts: Nikola Jokić 24; Rebs: Nikola Jokić 10; Asts: Vasilije Micić 7

Sinan Erdem Dome, Istanbul
Attendance: 15,556
Referees: Antonio Conde, Martin Horozov, Michał Proc

== Tournament ==
The EuroBasket 2022 is the 41st edition of the EuroBasket championship that is organized by FIBA Europe. It will be the first since it was agreed it would take place every four years, with a similar system of qualification as for the FIBA Basketball World Cup. It was originally scheduled to take place between 2 and 19 September 2021, but due to the COVID-19 pandemic and the subsequent postponement of the 2020 Summer Olympics to 2021, it has been postponed to 1 to 18 September 2022. Like the previous two editions, the tournament will be co-hosted by four countries. Games in the group stage will be held in the Czech Republic, Georgia, Germany, and Italy. The knock-out phase will be played in Berlin, Germany.

=== Preliminary round ===
The draw took place on 29 April 2021 in Berlin. Serbia was drawn into Group D with Czech Republic, Finland, Israel, Netherlands, and Poland and played all of its group phase matches in Prague, Czech Republic, at the O2 Arena from 2–8 September. The top four teams advanced to the knockout stage.

Pos	Team	Pld	W	L	PF	PA	PD	Pts	Qualification
1	Serbia	5	5	0	466	361	+105	10	Knockout stage
2	Finland	5	3	2	432	403	+29	8 (Note: Finland 89–59 Poland)	Knockout stage
3	Poland	5	3	2	387	414	−27	8	Knockout stage
4	Czech Republic (H)	5	2	3	416	435	−19	7 (Note: Czech Republic 88–77 Israel)	Knockout stage
5	Israel	5	2	3	394	416	−22	7	
6	Netherlands	5	0	5	359	425	−66	5	

Source: FIBA
Rules for classification: 1) Points; 2) Head-to-head results; 3) Points difference; 4) Points scored.
(H) Hosts
Notes:

Results by round

Round	1	2	3	4	5
Ground	H	A	H	A	H
Result	W	W	W	W	W
Position	1	1	1	1	1

Last updated: 8 September 2022.
Source: Competitive matches
Ground: A = Away; H = Home; R = Rest. Result: L = Loss; W = Win; R = Rest; P = Postponed.

All times are local (UTC+2).

==== Netherlands ====
Center Nikola Milutinov was out of the Serbian roster due to health issues.

2 September 2022	Serbia	100–76	Netherlands	O2 Arena, Prague
21:00	Scoring by quarter: 31–21, 20–17, 24–23, 25–15
	Pts: Jokić 19; Rebs: Jokić, Ristić 6 Asts: Micić 12	Boxscore	Pts: De Jong 28; Rebs: Haarms 6 Asts: Van der Vuurst de Vries 4	Attendance: 4,808; Referees: Yener Yılmaz (TUR), Gvidas Gedvilas (LTU), Kerem Baki (TUR)
Note:

A Dutch forward Worthy de Jong played one of the best games of his career, getting 28 points for the Netherlands, but Serbia had another gear in them and were unfazed en route to a winning start, a 100–76 victory in front of a large group of their fans in Czech Republic. The main reason for Serbia never losing their composure was the fact they have center Nikola Jokić and guard Vasilije Micić in their ranks. Both stars played outstanding games to safely guide Serbia to a first win ahead of their match-up with the group hosts on Saturday. The Netherlands were a stubborn opponent on Friday night, not giving up for even a second. Their best stretch was in the beginning of the third-quarter, when Worthy de Jong helped them reduce the deficit to 56–51 with five to play in third. However, Jokić and Micić remained calm and created a 14-3 run to get back into double digits. They were on cruise control the rest of the way, even with Oranje coming back to single digit deficit a couple of times. Guard Micić was impressive with a 15-point, 12-assist double-double, while Jokić finished with 19 points, 6 rebounds and 4 assists, sitting out the entire fourth quarter. Serbia were +10 in rebounds, +8 in steals, +10 in assists, -9 in turnovers, +9 in points from turnovers, +10 in fast break points, +17 in second chance points, +24 in points in the paint, +8 in points from the bench. They are just warming up, and that's a scary sight when they scored 100 points in this one. Guard Vanja Marinković had five threes and 18 points, center Dušan Ristić and forward Nikola Kalinić were also in double figures, all 11 players played and all 11 of them scored. Perfect start for Serbian coach Svetislav Pešić, who is still waiting for Nikola Milutinov to join. The Netherlands made Serbia work, and Worthy de Jong scored 28 points in 27 minutes, done on 11-of-14 shooting from the field. Guard Keye van der Vuurst de Vries was the only other man in double digits with 11.

It is the second highest scoring game for Serbia in the EuroBasket history. Guard Micić became the second Serbian player with a 15+ points and 10+ assists game, as well as the 16th Serbian player with a double-double at a major tournament since 1995.

Starters:			Pts	Reb	Ast
PG	22	Vasilije Micić	15	1	12
SG	9	Vanja Marinković	18	1	1
F	10	Nikola Kalinić	10	3	3
F	11	Vladimir Lučić	6	2	0
C	15	Nikola Jokić	19	6	4
Reserves:					
SF	7	Dejan Davidovac	1	3	1
C	14	Dušan Ristić	11	6	0
G	16	Nemanja Nedović	2	2	2
PF	21	Marko Jagodić-Kuridža	4	5	2
G	23	Marko Gudurić	5	2	1
PG	25	Ognjen Jaramaz	9	1	0
Head coach:
Svetislav Pešić

SRB	NED

SRB	Statistics	NED
23/39 (59%)	2-pt field goals	17/34 (50%)
14/31 (45%)	3-pt field goals	13/25 (52%)
12/17 (71%)	Free throws	3/6 (50%)
15	Offensive rebounds	8
22	Defensive rebounds	19
37	Total rebounds	27
26	Assists	16
7	Turnovers	16
10	Steals	2
2	Blocks	1
12	Fouls	18

Starters:			Pts	Reb	Ast
PG	1	Keye van der Vuurst de Vries	11	1	4
PG	90	Charlon Kloof	7	2	3
G/F	6	Worthy de Jong	28	2	1
PF	9	Mohamed Kherrazi	6	1	0
F/C	33	Jito Kok	0	2	2
Reserves:					
G	0	Yannick Franke	DNP		
G	5	Leon Williams	6	3	2
G/F	11	Shane Hammink	6	3	2
F/C	13	Roeland Schaftenaar	DNP		
C	14	Jesse Edwards	2	4	1
PF	30	Olaf Schaftenaar	2	2	0
C	32	Matt Haarms	8	6	1
Head coach:
(Italian Basketball Federation) Maurizio Buscaglia

- TCL Player of the Game: Nikola Jokić and Vasilije Micić

==== Czech Republic ====
Center Nikola Milutinov was out of the Serbian roster due to health issues, as well as a Czech guard Tomáš Satoranský.

3 September 2022	Czech Republic	68–81	Serbia	O2 Arena, Prague
17:30	Scoring by quarter: 15–20, 10–23, 24–17, 19–21
	Pts: Hruban, Krejčí 13; Rebs: Balvín 9 Asts: Sehnal 7	Boxscore	Pts: Jokić 18; Rebs: Jokić 11; Asts: Micić 6	Attendance: 15,067; Referees: Antonio Conde (ESP), Kerem Baki (TUR), Fernando Calatrava (ESP)
Note:

It was always going to be an uphill battle for Czech Republic, and after learning that their captain Tomáš Satoranský would not suit up for the game against Serbia, it got tougher. Svetislav Pešić's men used a dominant second quarter to escape their opposition and secure their 2-0 record. Backed by the crowd in the sold-out arena in Prague, the hosts were holding on in the first quarter, ending it with a five point deficit. However, Serbia's next huddle proved to be the winning one, as head coach Pešić found the panacea for the poison already after 10 minutes. A much more determined Serbian squad came out in the second, and a 15-0 run followed, suddenly making a couple of thousand Serbian fans louder than the Czech majority in the stands. The biggest lead was 23 points in the third quarter. However, the hosts did have one final push to raise the volume in the arena again. The Czechs got back to a single-digit deficit a few times in the last quarter, only to see Vasilije Micić, Nikola Jokić and Vanja Marinković come up with big shots and assists, pushing the lead back to safety. Serbian center Jokić was unstoppable, recording 18 points in 25 minutes of playing time, done on 7-of-11 shooting from the field, with 11 rebounds, 5 assists and 2 steals. Turnovers hurt Czech Republic, as they committed 15 of them, which Serbia turned into an 18–8 advantage in points off turnovers. At the same time, Serbia lost possession only five times in the entire game. It finished 81–68, meaning Serbia sits on top of the group standings or now. Czech Republic are now in a do-or-die situation at 0–2 with three games remaining.

Serbian center Jokić recorded his third double-double at a major tournament, becoming the fourth player since 1995 to do so.

Starters:			Pts	Reb	Ast
PG	19	Ondřej Sehnal	5	1	7
SG	17	Jaromír Bohačík	0	0	0
SF	7	Vojtěch Hruban	13	4	3
F/C	24	Jan Veselý	2	6	1
C	12	Ondřej Balvín	8	9	1
Reserves:					
F/C	1	Patrik Auda	8	3	0
PF	15	Martin Peterka	11	3	0
G/F	25	David Jelínek	3	0	0
G	27	Vít Krejčí	13	1	3
F/C	31	Martin Kříž	0	2	0
SG	77	Tomáš Kyzlink	5	6	4
Head coach:
(Israeli Basketball Association) Ronen Ginzburg

CZE	SRB

CZE	Statistics	SRB
16/37 (43%)	2-pt field goals	19/37 (51%)
8/21 (38%)	3-pt field goals	8/27 (30%)
12/13 (92%)	Free throws	19/23 (83%)
8	Offensive rebounds	10
30	Defensive rebounds	24
38	Total rebounds	34
19	Assists	19
15	Turnovers	5
2	Steals	8
1	Blocks	2
24	Fouls	16

Starters:			Pts	Reb	Ast
PG	22	Vasilije Micić	13	4	6
SG	9	Vanja Marinković	11	1	0
F	10	Nikola Kalinić	10	2	2
F	11	Vladimir Lučić	6	4	1
C	15	Nikola Jokić	18	11	5
Reserves:					
SF	7	Dejan Davidovac	2	2	0
C	14	Dušan Ristić	4	3	0
G	16	Nemanja Nedović	2	0	1
PF	21	Marko Jagodić-Kuridža	2	3	0
G	23	Marko Gudurić	8	1	3
PG	25	Ognjen Jaramaz	5	1	1
Head coach:
Svetislav Pešić

- TCL Player of the Game: Nikola Jokić

==== Finland ====
Guard Vanja Marinković was out of the Serbian roster due to stomach issues, while center Nikola Milutinov returns.

5 September 2022	Serbia	100–70	Finland	O2 Arena, Prague
21:00	Scoring by quarter: 33–22, 29–12, 14–14, 24–22
	Pts: Micić, Nedović 14; Rebs: Jokić 14; Asts: Jokić, Micić 7	Boxscore	Pts: Markkanen 18; Rebs: Markkanen 7 Asts: Markkanen 5	Attendance: 6,203; Referees: Yener Yılmaz (TUR), Fernando Calatrava (ESP), Gvidas Gedvilas (LTU)
Note:

Backed by their 5,000 traveling fans and led by their NBA star, Lauri Markkanen, Finland hoped they could make life difficult for Serbia on Monday. The 2017 runners-up however responded with a statement win, 100–70, which lifts them to 3–0 in Group D. Serbia missed only two shots in the first six and a half minutes, dished out 8 assists on 11 field goals and scored 26 points by that point already. Finland made a run to reduce the deficit to 33–22 at the end of the first quarter, but a merciless 11–0 Serbian run made it clear that there will be no upset in Prague. Serbia had 62 at the half, Finland passed that mark only at the 2:07 mark in the fourth quarter. Meaning, Serbia scored more in 20 minutes than Finland in 38. Serbian coach Svetislav Pešić showed a masterful display of out-pacing Finland, matching their intensity by going even harder after them, and balancing out the minutes and roles for all his players. The one who shined the brightest was once again Nikola Jokić, with 13 points, 14 rebounds and 7 assists. Also in double digits: Vasilije Micić (14 points, 7 assists), Nemanja Nedović (14 points), Nikola Kalinić (13 points, 5 assists, 4 rebounds), Vladimir Lučić (12 points) and Marko Gudurić (11 points). Serbia's high percentages were due to their good looks all game long. They got 44 points in the paint, exactly the double of Finland's tally in the key.

Starters:			Pts	Reb	Ast
PG	22	Vasilije Micić	14	3	7
G	16	Nemanja Nedović	14	1	3
F	10	Nikola Kalinić	13	4	5
F	11	Vladimir Lučić	12	1	0
C	15	Nikola Jokić	13	14	7
Reserves:					
SF	7	Dejan Davidovac	6	2	0
C	14	Dušan Ristić	2	1	0
PF	21	Marko Jagodić-Kuridža	7	4	2
G	23	Marko Gudurić	11	2	3
PG	25	Ognjen Jaramaz	8	0	3
C	33	Nikola Milutinov	DNP		
Head coach:
Svetislav Pešić

SRB	FIN

SRB	Statistics	FIN
25/37 (68%)	2-pt field goals	17/30 (57%)
12/28 (43%)	3-pt field goals	9/33 (27%)
14/17 (82%)	Free throws	9/10 (90%)
10	Offensive rebounds	9
27	Defensive rebounds	19
37	Total rebounds	28
30	Assists	21
13	Turnovers	19
10	Steals	6
1	Blocks	1
16	Fouls	18

Starters:			Pts	Reb	Ast
PG	21	Edon Maxhuni	10	0	3
G	9	Sasu Salin	6	6	2
SF	7	Shawn Huff	6	1	0
F	23	Lauri Markkanen	18	7	5
PF	18	Mikael Jantunen	4	1	1
Reserves:					
G	1	Miro Little	0	0	1
G	11	Petteri Koponen	0	0	1
SG	14	Henri Kantonen	3	0	2
G/F	19	Elias Valtonen	10	2	1
C	20	Alexander Madsen	2	5	1
PG	35	Ilari Seppälä	7	0	4
SG	41	Topias Palmi	4	1	0
Head coach:
Lassi Tuovi

- TCL Player of the Game: Svetislav Pešić

==== Israel ====
A Serbian guard Vanja Marinković did not suit up for the second game, still recovering from his stomach issues.

6 September 2022	Israel	78–89	Serbia	O2 Arena, Prague
21:00	Scoring by quarter: 18–24, 20–26, 20–15, 20–24
	Pts: Madar 20; Rebs: Sorkin 9 Asts: Avdija 5	Boxscore	Pts: Jokić 29; Rebs: Jokić 11; Asts: Jokić 5	Attendance: 3,289; Referees: Ademir Zurapović (BIH), Yener Yılmaz (TUR), Gintaras Mačiulis (LTU)
Note:

Israel put up a fight, came within two points in the fourth quarter, but a quick Serbian 14–0 run put the game out of their reach. Serbia were bothered by Israel's matchup zone, but still able to stay in front for most of the game. Their biggest lead was by 18 points, however Israeli Deni Avdija (also holding Serbian citizenship) decided to make things interesting. With his scoring, passing and elite defense that saw him guard everybody from Serbian guard Vasilije Micić to center Nikola Jokić, Israel went on an inspired run to reduce the gap to 65–63 in the fourth quarter. That only made the Serbian machine switch to a higher speed. A swift 14–0 run wasn't powered by Jokić nor Micić. Serbian guard Ognjen Jaramaz exploded and collected 10 points, guiding Serbia back towards double digit lead, and ultimately to their fourth win in four tries. Jokić had 29 points on 11-of-13 shooting, with 11 rebounds and 5 assists. His defense was also on the highest possible level, 4 steals and 2 blocks got him an efficiency rating of 46, a game-high by some distance and a new tournament high. Serbia had 10 steals, forced 17 turnovers, went +11 in fast break points, more than enough to win this. Serbia once again had Micić in a good mood, 19 points, and forward Nikola Kalinić was also in double figures with 10.

Jokić became the first Serbian with a double-double in three games in a row, as well as the first Serbian player with a 25+ points and 10+ rebounds game at EuroBasket.

Starters:			Pts	Reb	Ast
PG	45	Tamir Blatt	3	0	0
G/F	50	Yovel Zoosman	3	3	1
SF	8	Deni Avdija	14	6	5
PF	41	Tomer Ginat	0	1	0
F/C	4	Roman Sorkin	11	9	3
Reserves:					
PG	7	Gal Mekel	5	1	4
SF	10	Guy Pnini	0	1	0
PG	11	Yam Madar	20	0	4
SF	12	Rafi Menco	9	2	2
F/C	15	Jake Cohen	7	4	0
F/C	20	Idan Zalmanson	DNP		
F	30	Nimrod Levi	6	2	1
Head coach:
Guy Goodes

ISR	SRB

ISR	Statistics	SRB
14/28 (50%)	2-pt field goals	19/35 (54%)
14/33 (42%)	3-pt field goals	10/25 (40%)
8/9 (89%)	Free throws	21/24 (88%)
11	Offensive rebounds	11
19	Defensive rebounds	22
30	Total rebounds	33
20	Assists	17
17	Turnovers	15
5	Steals	10
4	Blocks	4
21	Fouls	17

Starters:			Pts	Reb	Ast
PG	22	Vasilije Micić	19	3	3
G	16	Nemanja Nedović	6	2	1
F	10	Nikola Kalinić	10	7	3
F	11	Vladimir Lučić	7	2	2
C	15	Nikola Jokić	29	11	5
Reserves:					
SF	7	Dejan Davidovac	DNP		
C	14	Dušan Ristić	0	0	0
PF	21	Marko Jagodić-Kuridža	0	1	0
G	23	Marko Gudurić	8	1	2
PG	25	Ognjen Jaramaz	10	4	1
C	33	Nikola Milutinov	DNP		
Head coach:
Svetislav Pešić

- TCL Player of the Game: Nikola Jokić

==== Poland ====
Serbian guard Nemanja Nedović is out of the Serbian roster due to injury, while guard Vanja Marinković returns.

8 September 2022	Serbia	96–69	Poland	O2 Arena, Prague
21:00	Scoring by quarter: 28–14, 24–19, 20–17, 24–19
	Pts: Jokić 19; Rebs: Jokić 5 Asts: Micić 9	Boxscore	Pts: Michalak 17; Rebs: Olejniczak 5 Asts: Ponitka 6	Attendance: 4,903; Referees: Antonio Conde (ESP), Kerem Baki (TUR), Fernando Calatrava (ESP)
Note:

Serbia were the clear favorite to win their Group, and they delivered with a perfect record, two wins clear of everyone else. Serbian center Nikola Jokić sat out the fourth quarter, and still was the best player in a 96–69 win over Poland on Thursday that concluded group action. He looked inspired as he collected 19 points on 7-of-8 shooting, done in less than 18 minutes on the floor. Serbia finished the group stage at 5–0, Poland fell to 3–2. Finland, who had the tiebreaker over the Poles take second place in the group and hence coach Igor Miličić and his men drop to third place in the final standings. There were a number of short runs by Serbia that handed them a double digit lead early on, and it kept growing all the way until they got to 52–33 at the break. Poland was trailing by 13 early on in the third quarter, but a timeout by coach Svetislav Pešić resulted in Serbia pulling away decisively for a 25-point lead by the end of the period. Serbia dominated the boxscore, but perhaps the best indicator of their exhibition were the points in the pain, where they oustcored Poland 48–22. Serbia were perfect in Prague and got better with each passing game. Serbian center Nikola Milutinov made his EuroBasket 2022 debut with 16 points on 5-of-7 shooting from the field.

Starters:			Pts	Reb	Ast
PG	22	Vasilije Micić	12	4	9
PG	25	Ognjen Jaramaz	6	2	4
F	10	Nikola Kalinić	11	1	1
F	11	Vladimir Lučić	4	1	0
C	15	Nikola Jokić	19	5	1
Reserves:					
SF	7	Dejan Davidovac	10	3	5
SG	9	Vanja Marinković	0	1	1
C	14	Dušan Ristić	0	0	0
PF	21	Marko Jagodić-Kuridža	3	4	2
G	23	Marko Gudurić	15	3	3
C	33	Nikola Milutinov	16	3	1
Head coach:
Svetislav Pešić

SRB	POL

SRB	Statistics	POL
25/34 (74%)	2-pt field goals	19/29 (66%)
11/20 (55%)	3-pt field goals	8/28 (29%)
13/18 (72%)	Free throws	7/9 (78%)
5	Offensive rebounds	7
23	Defensive rebounds	15
28	Total rebounds	22
27	Assists	18
12	Turnovers	15
10	Steals	5
3	Blocks	1
16	Fouls	23

Starters:			Pts	Reb	Ast
G	6	A. J. Slaughter	3	1	2
SF	9	Mateusz Ponitka	7	0	6
SF	3	Michał Sokołowski	9	1	1
PF	5	Aaron Cel	5	0	1
C	2	Aleksander Balcerowski	6	2	3
Reserves:					
PF	1	Jarosław Zyskowski	6	1	0
PG	10	Łukasz Kolenda	10	1	1
F/C	11	Aleksander Dziewa	12	3	1
C	13	Dominik Olejniczak	4	5	2
SG	23	Michal Michalak	17	4	1
G/F	30	Jakub Garbacz	2	0	0
PG	55	Jakub Schenk	0	1	0
Head coach:
(Croatian Basketball Federation) Igor Miličić

- TCL Player of the Game: Nikola Jokić

=== Knockout stage ===
Serbia finished as the group winner in its preliminary group and advanced to the Round of 16 of the EuroBasket and will play against the fourth placed team of Group C, which is Italy, in Berlin, Germany, at the Mercedes-Benz Arena on 11 September.

==== Round of 16 ====
Serbian guard Nemanja Nedović is out of the Serbian roster due to injury. Serbia won over Italy in an exhibition game at DBB Supercup in Hamburg on 19 August.

11 September 2022	Serbia	86–94	Italy	Mercedes-Benz Arena, Berlin
18:00	Scoring by quarter: 28–20, 23–25, 17–21, 18–28
	Pts: Jokić 32; Rebs: Jokić 13; Asts: Micić 8	Boxscore	Pts: Spissu 22; Rebs: Polonara 8 Asts: Spissu 6	Attendance: 9,788; Referees: Antonio Conde (ESP), Yener Yılmaz (TUR), Martin Horozov (BUL)
Note:

Italy pulled off the first upset of the Round of 16 with a 94–86 shock over Serbia to reach the Quarter-Finals. One summer after surprising Serbia in the Final of the 2020 FIBA Olympic Qualifying Tournament in Belgrade to reach the Tokyo Games, Italy worked their team basketball magic again – and doing it without head coach Gianmarco Pozzecco who was ejected in the third quarter. Serbia raced ahead by 11 points in the first quarter and the cushion grew to 14 points in the second quarter. Italy came back and were hanging tough down just 61–57 with under 5 minutes left in the third quarter when Pozzecco left the court in tears after being ejected from the game with a second technical foul. Italy took the lead 66–63 and were down 68–66 after 30 minutes. But Italy opened the fourth quarter with a 16–2 run to lead 82–70. Serbia could not regain the momentum. Italian guard Marco Spissu came up for an incredible second half as the Italian guard poured in 19 of his 22 points in the final 20 minutes. He also finished the game with 6 assists, 4 rebounds and 2 steals. Nikola Jokić's 32 points and 13 rebounds were not enough for Serbia. Italy shot 36.2 percent from three-point range on 32 attempts per game in the Group Phase and then made 16-of-38 for 42.0 percent against Serbia. Italy committed only 7 turnovers and forced Serbia into 16 miscues for an advantage of 16–6 in points off turnovers. Italy held Serbia to 10.0 percent below their field goal shooting and 11.0 percent below their two-point shooting.

Starters:			Pts	Reb	Ast
PG	22	Vasilije Micić	16	4	8
SG	9	Vanja Marinković	8	1	1
F	10	Nikola Kalinić	12	4	2
F	11	Vladimir Lučić	8	2	0
C	15	Nikola Jokić	32	13	4
Reserves:					
SF	7	Dejan Davidovac	0	0	1
C	14	Dušan Ristić	DNP		
PF	21	Marko Jagodić-Kuridža	6	1	0
G	23	Marko Gudurić	0	0	0
PG	25	Ognjen Jaramaz	0	5	0
C	33	Nikola Milutinov	2	2	0
Head coach:
Svetislav Pešić

SRB	ITA

SRB	Statistics	ITA
16/32 (50%)	2-pt field goals	15/29 (52%)
10/29 (35%)	3-pt field goals	16/38 (42%)
24/28 (86%)	Free throws	16/21 (76%)
14	Offensive rebounds	9
25	Defensive rebounds	24
39	Total rebounds	33
17	Assists	22
16	Turnovers	7
4	Steals	11
2	Blocks	6
25	Fouls	28

Starters:			Pts	Reb	Ast
PG	0	Marco Spissu	22	4	6
G	7	Stefano Tonut	5	1	3
F	13	Simone Fontecchio	19	5	1
F	33	Achille Polonara	16	8	3
PF	9	Nicolò Melli	21	6	4
Reserves:					
G	1	Nico Mannion	2	0	1
C	6	Paul Biligha	0	0	0
C	16	Amedeo Tessitori	DNP		
PF	17	Giampaolo Ricci	2	1	0
PG	25	Tommaso Baldasso	DNP		
PG	54	Alessandro Pajola	1	3	4
PF	77	Luigi Datome	6	1	0
Head coach:
Gianmarco Pozzecco

- TCL Player of the Game: Marco Spissu (ITA)

== Awards ==
TCL Player of the Game
Round	Player	Eff.
PR1	Nikola Jokić; Vasilije Micić	24; 23
PR2	Nikola Jokić	30
PR4	Nikola Jokić	46
PR5	Nikola Jokić	23

Top Performers
Day	Player	Eff.	Ref.
3 September	Nikola Jokić	30	
5 September	Nikola Jokić	26	
6 September	Nikola Jokić	46	
8 September	Nikola Jokić	23	
11 September	Nikola Jokić	41	

== Statistics ==
Tournament highs

=== Player statistics ===
Legend
GP	Games played	GS	Games started	MPG	Minutes per game
FG%	Field-goal percentage	3FG%	3-point field-goal percentage	FT%	Free-throw percentage
RPG	Rebounds per game	APG	Assists per game	SPG	Steals per game
BPG	Blocks per game	PPG	Points per game	EF	PIR per game

Player	GP	GS	MPG	FG%	3FG%	FT%	RPG	APG	SPG	BPG	PPG	EF
Dejan Davidovac	4	0	18.3	.571	.333	.500	2.5	1.5	0.3	0.3	4.8	6.3
Marko Gudurić	5	0	22.8	.588	.375	.900	1.8	2.4	1.2	0.4	9.4	9.8
Marko Jagodić-Kuridža	5	0	19.9	.625	.250	.600	3.4	1.2	0.8	0.2	3.2	6.6
Ognjen Jaramaz	5	1	15.6	.333	.423	.833	1.6	1.8	0.6	0.2	7.6	7.2
Nikola Jokić	5	5	24.3	.745	.400	.889	9.4	4.4	1.8	0.6	19.6	29.8
Nikola Kalinić	5	5	24.5	.600	.632	.750	3.4	2.8	2.0	0.2	10.8	15.8
Vladimir Lučić	5	5	21.6	.500	.125	1.000	2.0	0.6	0.8	0.4	7.0	6.4
Vanja Marinković	3	2	14.7	.667	.571	.500	1.0	0.7	0.7	0.0	9.7	9.0
Vasilije Micić	5	5	25.8	.593	.364	.810	3.0	7.4	1.0	0.0	14.6	18.6
Nikola Milutinov	1	0	19.7	.714	.000	.857	3.0	1.0	0.0	0.0	16.0	16.0
Nemanja Nedović	4	2	13.0	.667	.286	1.000	1.3	1.8	0.8	0.0	6.0	7.0
Dušan Ristić	5	0	7.8	.500	1.000	.333	2.0	0.0	0.2	0.2	3.4	3.8
Total	5	5	200.0	.610	.420	.857	33.8	23.8	9.6	2.4	93.2	117.2

Last updated: 8 September 2022.
Source: 2022 Serbia EuroBasket team

==== Double-doubles ====
- Nikola Jokić – 4
- Vasilije Micić – 1

=== Statistical leaders ===
Last updated: 11 September 2022

==== Individual game highs ====
Statistic	Name	Total	Opponent
Points	Nikola Jokić	32	Italy
Total Rebounds	Nikola Jokić	14	Finland
Assists	Vasilije Micić	12	Netherlands
Blocks	Nikola Jokić	2	Israel
Steals	Nikola Jokić	4	Israel
Efficiency	Nikola Jokić	46	Israel
Field goal percentage (Note: At least 6 attempts.)	Nikola Jokić	88% (7/8)	Poland
2-point field goal percentage	Nikola Jokić	86% (6/7)	Poland
3-point field goal percentage (Note: At least 4 scores.)	Vanja Marinković	63% (5/8)	Netherlands
Free throw percentage	Nikola Jokić	100% (6/6)	Israel
Turnovers	Nikola Jokić	4	Italy
Minutes	Nikola Kalinić	33:43	Israel

Statistic	Name	Total	Opponent
Field goals made	Nikola Jokić	11	Israel
Field goals attempted	Nikola Jokić	14	Italy
2-point field goals made	Nikola Jokić	10	Israel
2-point field goals attempted	Nikola Jokić	11	Italy
3-point field goals made	Vanja Marinković	5	Netherlands
3-point field goals attempted	Vanja Marinković; Vasilije Micić	8	Netherlands; Italy
Free throws made	Nikola Jokić	14	Italy
Free throws attempted	Nikola Jokić	15	Italy
Offensive Rebounds	Nikola Jokić	6	Italy
Defensive Rebounds	Nikola Jokić	10	Finland
+/-	Ognjen Jaramaz	31	Poland

==== Team game highs ====
Statistic	Total	Opponent
Points	100	Netherlands; Finland
Total Rebounds	39	Italy
Assists	30	Finland
Blocks	4	Israel
Steals	10	Netherlands; Finland; Israel; Poland
Efficiency	134	Finland
Field goal percentage	57% (37/65)	Finland
2-point field goal percentage	74% (25/34)	Poland
3-point field goal percentage	55% (11/20)	Poland
Free throw percentage	88% (21/24)	Israel
Turnovers	16	Italy

Statistic	Total	Opponent
Field goals made	37	Netherlands; Finland
Field goals attempted	70	Netherlands
2-point field goals made	25	Finland; Poland
2-point field goals attempted	39	Netherlands
3-point field goals made	14	Netherlands
3-point field goals attempted	31	Netherlands
Free throws made	24	Italy
Free throws attempted	28	Italy
Offensive Rebounds	15	Netherlands
Defensive Rebounds	27	Finland
+/-	30	Finland
