= EuroBasket 2022 Group A =

Group A of EuroBasket 2022 consisted of Belgium, Bulgaria, Georgia, Montenegro, Spain, and Turkey. The games were played from 1 to 7 September 2022 at the newly built Tbilisi Arena in Tbilisi, Georgia. The top four teams advanced to the knockout stage.

== Teams ==
After the 2022 Russian invasion of Ukraine, Russia was expelled from the tournament and replaced by Montenegro.

Team	Qualification method	Date of qualification	App	Last	Best placement in tournament	World Ranking	
Team	Qualification method	Date of qualification	App	Last	Best placement in tournament	March 2021 (Note: The rankings of March 2021 were used for the final draw.)	September 2022
Belgium	Group C top three	20 February 2021	18th	2017	Fourth place (1947)	37	37
Bulgaria	Group H top three	20 February 2021	25th	2011	Runners-up (1957)	49	52
Georgia	Host nation	15 July 2019	5th	2017	11th place (2011)	36	36
~~Russia~~	Group B top three	19 February 2021	14th	2017	Champions (2007)	9	—
Spain	Group A top three	30 November 2020	32nd	2017	Champions (2009, 2011, 2015)	2	2
Turkey	Group D top three	20 February 2021	25th	2017	Runners-up (2001)	15	16
Montenegro	Replacement	20 May 2022	4th	2017	13th place (2017)	25	25

Notes

- Russia was expelled due to the Russian invasion of Ukraine.

== Standings ==
Pos	Team	Pld	W	L	PF	PA	PD	Pts	Qualification
1	Spain	5	4	1	431	368	+63	9	Knockout stage
2	Turkey	5	3	2	403	378	+25	8 (Note: Turkey 4 Pts; Montenegro 3 Pts; Belgium 2 Pts)	Knockout stage
3	Montenegro	5	3	2	381	378	+3	8	Knockout stage
4	Belgium	5	3	2	384	383	+1	8	Knockout stage
5	Bulgaria	5	1	4	427	475	−48	6 (Note: Bulgaria 92–80 Georgia)	
6	Georgia (H)	5	1	4	381	425	−44	6	

Source: FIBA
Rules for classification: 1) Points; 2) Head-to-head results; 3) Points difference; 4) Points scored.
(H) Hosts

== Matches ==
All times are local (UTC+4).

=== Spain vs Bulgaria ===
1 September 2022	Spain	114–87	Bulgaria	Tbilisi Arena, Tbilisi
15:30	Scoring by quarter: 28–17, 29–18, 32–31, 25–21
	Pts: Brown 17; Rebs: Garuba, J. Hernangómez 7 Asts: Brown 5	Boxscore	Pts: Vezenkov 26; Rebs: Vezenkov 11; Asts: Bost 7	Attendance: 500; Referees: Erez Gurion (ISR), Martin Vulić (CRO), Beniamino Attard (ITA)

=== Turkey vs Montenegro ===
1 September 2022	Turkey	72–68	Montenegro	Tbilisi Arena, Tbilisi
18:15	Scoring by quarter: 14–18, 27–13, 12–20, 19–17
	Pts: Larkin 18; Rebs: Şengün 6 Asts: Larkin 7	Boxscore	Pts: Dubljević 18; Rebs: Simonović 7 Asts: Perry 9	Attendance: 1,500; Referees: Saverio Lanzarini (ITA), Oskars Lūcis (LAT), Gatis Saliņš (LAT)

=== Belgium vs Georgia ===
1 September 2022	Belgium	79–76(OT)	Georgia	Tbilisi Arena, Tbilisi
21:00	Scoring by quarter: 16–11, 22–21, 20–19, 12–19, Overtime: 9–6
	Pts: Mwema, Tabu 14; Rebs: Bako 6 Asts: Lecomte 5	Boxscore	Pts: Mamukelashvili 18; Rebs: Mamukelashvili 13; Asts: McFadden 6	Attendance: 6,000; Referees: Aleksandar Glišić (SRB), Dariusz Zapolski (POL), Sergii Zashchuk (UKR)

=== Montenegro vs Belgium ===
3 September 2022	Montenegro	76–70	Belgium	Tbilisi Arena, Tbilisi
15:30	Scoring by quarter: 17–14, 20–18, 31–18, 8–20
	Pts: Dubljević 21; Rebs: Dubljević 11; Asts: Perry 5	Boxscore	Pts: Obasohan 25; Rebs: Vanwijn 7 Asts: Mwema 3	Attendance: 1,100; Referees: Oskars Lūcis (LAT), Sergii Zashchuk (UKR), Beniamino Attard (ITA)

=== Bulgaria vs Turkey ===
3 September 2022	Bulgaria	87–101	Turkey	Tbilisi Arena, Tbilisi
18:15	Scoring by quarter: 29–31, 23–19, 19–25, 16–26
	Pts: Vezenkov 28; Rebs: Vezenkov 15; Asts: Bost 13	Boxscore	Pts: Osman 25; Rebs: Şengün 9 Asts: Larkin 9	Attendance: 1,600; Referees: Aleksandar Glišić (SRB), Zdenko Tomašovič (SVK), Mihkel Männiste (EST)

=== Georgia vs Spain ===
3 September 2022	Georgia	64–90	Spain	Tbilisi Arena, Tbilisi
21:00	Scoring by quarter: 16–18, 15–22, 16–31, 17–19
	Pts: Andronikashvili 13; Rebs: Mamukelashvili 9 Asts: Mamukelashvili 3	Boxscore	Pts: W. Hernangómez 14; Rebs: J. Hernangómez, W. Hernangómez 7 Asts: Brown 5	Attendance: 7,500; Referees: Saverio Lanzarini (ITA), Dariusz Zapolski (POL), Gatis Saliņš (LAT)

=== Bulgaria vs Montenegro ===
4 September 2022	Bulgaria	81–91	Montenegro	Tbilisi Arena, Tbilisi
15:30	Scoring by quarter: 21–21, 25–24, 12–22, 23–24
	Pts: Vezenkov 26; Rebs: Vezenkov 8 Asts: Karamfilov 7	Boxscore	Pts: Mihailović 23; Rebs: Dubljević 9 Asts: Mihailović, Perry 5	Attendance: 650; Referees: Oskars Lūcis (LAT), Zdenko Tomašovič (SVK), Josip Jurčević (CRO)

=== Spain vs Belgium ===
4 September 2022	Spain	73–83	Belgium	Tbilisi Arena, Tbilisi
18:15	Scoring by quarter: 11–15, 22–17, 21–25, 19–26
	Pts: W. Hernangómez 18; Rebs: three players 4 Asts: Brown 8	Boxscore	Pts: Lecomte 20; Rebs: Bako 9 Asts: Lecomte 4	Attendance: 1,600; Referees: Saverio Lanzarini (ITA), Dariusz Zapolski (POL), Erez Gurion (ISR)

=== Turkey vs Georgia ===
After a scuffle between Furkan Korkmaz and Duda Sanadze, both players were ejected. Korkmaz was reportedly attacked when leaving the arena by Georgian players. The following day, the Turkish federation threatened to leave the tournament.

After the game, the Turkish federation also submitted a complaint because the game clock ran for 22 seconds while the game was paused; this complaint was dismissed by FIBA.

4 September 2022	Turkey	83–88(2OT)	Georgia	Tbilisi Arena, Tbilisi
21:00	Scoring by quarter: 25–19, 8–17, 16–17, 19–15, Overtime: 7–7, 8–13
	Pts: Şengün 21; Rebs: Şanlı, Şengün 9 Asts: Larkin 7	Boxscore	Pts: Mamukelashvili 20; Rebs: Mamukelashvili 12; Asts: McFadden 6	Attendance: 7,100; Referees: Aleksandar Glišić (SRB), Gatis Saliņš (LAT), Sergii Zashchuk (UKR)

=== Belgium vs Turkey ===
6 September 2022	Belgium	63–78	Turkey	Tbilisi Arena, Tbilisi
15:30	Scoring by quarter: 6–20, 24–17, 17–22, 16–19
	Pts: Bratanovic 15; Rebs: De Zeeuw 6 Asts: Lecomte, Tabu 4	Boxscore	Pts: Şengün 24; Rebs: Şengün 8 Asts: Larkin, Şengün 6	Attendance: 1,900; Referees: Saverio Lanzarini (ITA), Dariusz Zapolski (POL), Beniamino Attard (ITA)

=== Montenegro vs Spain ===
6 September 2022	Montenegro	65–82	Spain	Tbilisi Arena, Tbilisi
18:15	Scoring by quarter: 17–27, 14–26, 17–14, 17–15
	Pts: Mihailović 18; Rebs: Radončić 7 Asts: Perry 9	Boxscore	Pts: Brizuela 18; Rebs: W. Hernangómez 13; Asts: Brown 7	Attendance: 2,800; Referees: Oskars Lūcis (LAT), Sergii Zashchuk (UKR), Gatis Saliņš (LAT)

=== Georgia vs Bulgaria ===
6 September 2022	Georgia	80–92	Bulgaria	Tbilisi Arena, Tbilisi
21:00	Scoring by quarter: 18–14, 20–25, 19–27, 23–26
	Pts: Bitadze 21; Rebs: Mamukelashvili 11; Asts: Mamukelashvili 6	Boxscore	Pts: Bost 33; Rebs: Vezenkov 14; Asts: Bost 12	Attendance: 8,000; Referees: Erez Gurion (ISR), Mihkel Männiste (EST), Martin Vulić (CRO)

=== Turkey vs Spain ===
7 September 2022	Turkey	69–72	Spain	Tbilisi Arena, Tbilisi
15:30	Scoring by quarter: 18–17, 16–21, 16–18, 19–16
	Pts: Osman 20; Rebs: Şengün 12; Asts: Larkin 6	Boxscore	Pts: W. Hernangómez 15; Rebs: J. Hernangómez, W. Hernangómez 7 Asts: Brown 7	Attendance: 2,300; Referees: Oskars Lūcis (LAT), Martin Vulić (CRO), Beniamino Attard (ITA)

=== Bulgaria vs Belgium ===
7 September 2022	Bulgaria	80–89	Belgium	Tbilisi Arena, Tbilisi
18:15	Scoring by quarter: 19–20, 11–21, 30–25, 20–23
	Pts: Vezenkov 26; Rebs: Vezenkov 13; Asts: Bost 4	Boxscore	Pts: Obasohan 25; Rebs: Obasohan 7 Asts: Tabu 6	Attendance: 5,300; Referees: Erez Gurion (ISR), Zdenko Tomašovič (SVK), Mihkel Männiste (EST)

=== Georgia vs Montenegro ===
7 September 2022	Georgia	73–81	Montenegro	Tbilisi Arena, Tbilisi
21:00	Scoring by quarter: 19–21, 16–20, 17–17, 21–23
	Pts: McFadden 16; Rebs: Mamukelashvili 10; Asts: Bitadze, McFadden 4	Boxscore	Pts: Drobnjak 22; Rebs: Radović 11; Asts: Perry 9	Attendance: 8,100; Referees: Saverio Lanzarini (ITA), Dariusz Zapolski (POL), Serhiy Zashchuk (UKR)
