= Marko Marinović =

Serbian basketball player and coach

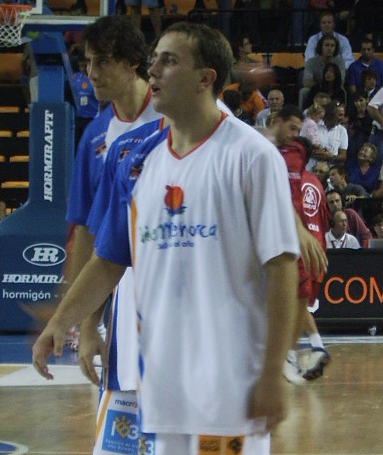
- Marinović with Menorca in October 2007

Adelaide 36ers
- Title: Assistant coach
- League: NBL

Personal information
- Born: 15 March 1983 (age 43) Čačak, SR Serbia, SFR Yugoslavia
- Listed height: 6 ft 0 in (1.83 m)
- Listed weight: 180 lb (82 kg)

Career information
- Playing career: 2000–2019
- Position: Point guard
- Number: 5, 14, 41, 45
- Coaching career: 2019–present

Career history

Playing
- 2000–2004: Borac Čačak
- 2004–2006: FMP Železnik
- 2006–2007: Girona
- 2007–2008: Menorca Bàsquet
- 2008–2009: Crvena zvezda
- 2009–2010: Valencia
- 2010–2011: ALBA Berlin
- 2011: Krasnye Krylya
- 2011–2012: Yenisey Krasnoyarsk
- 2012–2013: Levski Sofia
- 2013–2014: Radnički Kragujevac
- 2014–2015: Union Olimpija
- 2015–2016: Steaua București
- 2016: CSU Craiova
- 2017–2019: Borac Čačak

Coaching
- 2019–2022: Borac Čačak
- 2023–2024: Čačak 94 (assistant)
- 2024–present: Adelaide 36ers (assistant)

Career highlights
- As player: Eurocup champion (2010); FIBA EuroCup champion (2007); Adriatic League champion (2006); Serbian Cup winner (2005)

Marko Marinović (Serbian Cyrillic: Марко Мариновић, pronounced [mâːrkɔ marǐːnoʋitɕ]; born 15 March 1983) is a Serbian professional basketball coach and former player.

== Professional career ==
On 12 July 2013, Marinović signed with Radnički Kragujevac for the 2013–14 season. On 11 December 2013, he tied the Eurocup’s all-time single-game assist record with 15 in his team’s 91-81 victory over Neptunas Klaipeda.

In September 2014, Marinović signed a one-year deal with the Slovenian team Union Olimpija. In July 2015, he signed with Romanian club Steaua București for the 2015–16 season. Marinović started the 2016–17 season with SCM CSU Craiova, but left the club in late December 2016.

On 1 January 2017, Marinović returned to his first club Borac Čačak. On 29 June 2019, Marinović announced his retirement from playing professional career.

== National team career ==
Marinović was a member of the Yugoslavian under-20 team that took part in the 2000 European Championship. Three years later he won the gold medal with Serbia and Montenegro at the 2003 World University Games.

Marinović played at the 2006 FIBA World Championship in Japan with the Serbian national team. He averaged 5.3 points, 0.3 rebounds and 0.8 assists per game.

== Coaching career ==
=== Professional ===
On 29 June 2019, Marinović was named a head coach for his hometown team Borac Čačak. On 28 November 2022, Borac parted ways with him following a 1–7 run on the start of the 2022–23 ABA League First Division.

For the 2023–24 season, Marinović served as assistant coach for Čačak 94.

On 19 July 2024, Marinović was appointed an assistant coach of the Adelaide 36ers of the Australian National Basketball League for the 2024–25 season. He remained the 36ers' senior assistant as of the 2026–27 season. On 16 October 2026, Marinović took over as the 36ers' caretaker coach for their game against the Tasmania JackJumpers after head coach Trevor Gleeson was granted leave due to a personal matter. He guided the 36ers to a 94–88 win.

=== National team ===
In November 2021, Marinović was named an assistant coach for the Serbia national team under Svetislav Pešić. He was a staff member for Serbia's team at EuroBasket 2022.
