= EuroBasket 2022 knockout stage =

Knockout stage of EuroBasket 2022

The knockout stage of the EuroBasket 2022 took place between 10 and 18 September 2022. All games were played at the Mercedes-Benz Arena in Berlin, Germany.

== Qualified teams ==
Group	Winners	Runners-up	Third place	Fourth place
A	Spain	Turkey	Montenegro	Belgium
B	Slovenia	Germany	France	Lithuania
C	Greece	Ukraine	Croatia	Italy
D	Serbia	Finland	Poland	Czech Republic

== Bracket ==
Round of 16
10 September
Germany	85
Montenegro	79
11 September
Greece	94
Czech Republic	88
10 September
Spain (OT)	102
Lithuania	94
11 September
Finland	94
Croatia	86
10 September
Slovenia	88
Belgium	72
11 September
Ukraine	86
Poland	94
10 September
Turkey	86
France (OT)	87
11 September
Serbia	86
Italy	94

Quarterfinals
13 September
Germany	107
Greece	96
13 September
Spain	100
Finland	90
14 September
Slovenia	87
Poland	90
14 September
France (OT)	93
Italy	85

Semifinals
16 September
Germany	91
Spain	96
16 September
Poland	54
France	95

Final
18 September
Spain	88
France	76
Third place
18 September
Germany	82
Poland	69

All times are local (UTC+2).

== Round of 16 ==
=== Turkey vs France ===
10 September 2022	Turkey	86–87(OT)	France	Mercedes-Benz Arena, Berlin
12:00	Scoring by quarter: 11–18, 24–25, 22–6, 20–28, Overtime: 9–10
	Pts: Tuncer 22; Rebs: Şanlı 7 Asts: Hazer 6	Boxscore	Pts: Gobert 20; Rebs: Gobert 17; Asts: Heurtel 7	Attendance: 9,411; Referees: Antonio Conde (ESP), Boris Krejić (SLO), Martin Horozov (BUL)

=== Slovenia vs Belgium ===
10 September 2022	Slovenia	88–72	Belgium	Mercedes-Benz Arena, Berlin
14:45	Scoring by quarter: 24–19, 20–22, 19–19, 25–12
	Pts: Dončić 35; Rebs: Čančar 7 Asts: Dončić 5	Boxscore	Pts: Lecomte 16; Rebs: Gillet 10; Asts: Obasohan 4	Attendance: 9,774; Referees: Saverio Lanzarini (ITA), Fernando Calatrava (ESP), Gvidas Gedvilas (LTU)

=== Germany vs Montenegro ===
10 September 2022	Germany	85–79	Montenegro	Mercedes-Benz Arena, Berlin
18:00	Scoring by quarter: 19–10, 29–14, 19–26, 18–29
	Pts: Schröder 22; Rebs: Wagner 5 Asts: Schröder 8	Boxscore	Pts: Perry 25; Rebs: Simonović 9 Asts: Perry 6	Attendance: 12,938; Referees: Luis Castillo (ESP), Mārtiņš Kozlovskis (LAT), Paulo Marques (POR)

=== Spain vs Lithuania ===
10 September 2022	Spain	102–94(OT)	Lithuania	Mercedes-Benz Arena, Berlin
20:45	Scoring by quarter: 19–20, 21–25, 23–23, 20–15, Overtime: 19–11
	Pts: Brown 28; Rebs: Garuba, W. Hernangómez 8 Asts: Brown 8	Boxscore	Pts: Kuzminskas 18; Rebs: Sabonis 9 Asts: Jokubaitis 5	Attendance: 12,938; Referees: Yohan Rosso (FRA), Ademir Zurapović (BIH), Aleksandar Glišić (SRB)

=== Ukraine vs Poland ===
11 September 2022	Ukraine	86–94	Poland	Mercedes-Benz Arena, Berlin
12:00	Scoring by quarter: 21–24, 24–18, 22–27, 19–25
	Pts: Bobrov 15; Rebs: Len, Mykhailiuk 8 Asts: Sanon 8	Boxscore	Pts: Slaughter 24; Rebs: Ponitka 9 Asts: Ponitka 6	Attendance: 6,865; Referees: Ademir Zurapović (BIH), Nicolas Maestre (FRA), Carsten Straube (GER)

=== Finland vs Croatia ===
11 September 2022	Finland	94–86	Croatia	Mercedes-Benz Arena, Berlin
14:45	Scoring by quarter: 20–21, 25–22, 22–22, 27–21
	Pts: Markkanen 43; Rebs: Markkanen 9 Asts: three players 3	Boxscore	Pts: Bogdanović 23; Rebs: Šarić 9 Asts: Šarić 6	Attendance: 6,904; Referees: Saverio Lanzarini (ITA), Mārtiņš Kozlovskis (LAT), Lorenzo Baldini (ITA)

=== Serbia vs Italy ===
11 September 2022	Serbia	86–94	Italy	Mercedes-Benz Arena, Berlin
18:00	Scoring by quarter: 28–20, 23–25, 17–21, 18–28
	Pts: Jokić 32; Rebs: Jokić 13; Asts: Micić 8	Boxscore	Pts: Spissu 22; Rebs: Polonara 8 Asts: Spissu 6	Attendance: 9,788; Referees: Antonio Conde (ESP), Yener Yılmaz (TUR), Martin Horozov (BUL)

=== Greece vs Czech Republic ===
11 September 2022	Greece	94–88	Czech Republic	Mercedes-Benz Arena, Berlin
20:45	Scoring by quarter: 20–20, 21–25, 22–22, 31–21
	Pts: G. Antetokounmpo 27; Rebs: G. Antetokounmpo 10; Asts: Calathes 6	Boxscore	Pts: Veselý 21; Rebs: Satoranský 8 Asts: Satoranský 17	Attendance: 9,814; Referees: Yohan Rosso (FRA), Oskars Lucis (LAT), Kerem Baki (TUR)

== Quarterfinals ==
=== Spain vs Finland ===
13 September 2022	Spain	100–90	Finland	Mercedes-Benz Arena, Berlin
17:15	Scoring by quarter: 19–30, 24–22, 30–15, 27–23
	Pts: W. Hernangómez 27; Rebs: Garuba 6 Asts: Brown 11	Boxscore	Pts: Markkanen 28; Rebs: Markkanen 11; Asts: Little 6	Attendance: 7,935; Referees: Yohan Rosso (FRA), Martin Horozov (BUL), Kerem Baki (TUR)

=== Germany vs Greece ===
13 September 2022	Germany	107–96	Greece	Mercedes-Benz Arena, Berlin
20:30	Scoring by quarter: 31–27, 26–34, 26–10, 24–25
	Pts: Schröder 26; Rebs: Theis 16; Asts: Schröder 8	Boxscore	Pts: G. Antetokounmpo 31; Rebs: G. Antetokounmpo 7 Asts: G. Antetokounmpo 8	Attendance: 14,073; Referees: Ademir Zurapović (BIH), Saverio Lanzarini (ITA), Boris Krejić (SLO)

=== France vs Italy ===
14 September 2022	France	93–85(OT)	Italy	Mercedes-Benz Arena, Berlin
17:15	Scoring by quarter: 27–20, 11–11, 18–31, 21–15, Overtime: 16–8
	Pts: Heurtel 20; Rebs: Gobert 14; Asts: Heurtel 8	Boxscore	Pts: Fontecchio, Spissu 21; Rebs: Polonara 6 Asts: Melli 7	Attendance: 6,324; Referees: Ademir Zurapović (BIH), Mārtiņš Kozlovskis (LAT), Aleksandar Glišić (SRB)

=== Slovenia vs Poland ===
14 September 2022	Slovenia	87–90	Poland	Mercedes-Benz Arena, Berlin
20:30	Scoring by quarter: 26–29, 13–29, 24–6, 24–26
	Pts: Čančar 21; Rebs: Dončić 11; Asts: Dončić 7	Boxscore	Pts: Ponitka 26; Rebs: Ponitka 16; Asts: Ponitka 10	Attendance: 7,852; Referees: Antonio Conde (ESP), Martin Horozov (BUL), Kerem Baki (TUR)

== Semifinals ==
=== Poland vs France ===
France blew out Poland to record the largest semifinal victory in EuroBasket history.

16 September 2022	Poland	54–95	France	Mercedes-Benz Arena, Berlin
17:15	Scoring by quarter: 9–15, 9–19, 18–30, 18–31
	Pts: Michalak, Slaughter 9 Rebs: Cel 4 Asts: Kolenda, Schenk 3	Boxscore	Pts: Yabusele 22; Rebs: Fall 10; Asts: Heurtel 6	Attendance: 11,563; Referees: Saverio Lanzarini (ITA), Mārtiņš Kozlovskis (LAT), Lorenzo Baldini (ITA)

=== Germany vs Spain ===
16 September 2022	Germany	91–96	Spain	Mercedes-Benz Arena, Berlin
20:30	Scoring by quarter: 24–27, 27–19, 20–19, 20–31
	Pts: Schröder 30; Rebs: Obst 5 Asts: Schröder 8	Boxscore	Pts: Brown 29; Rebs: R. Fernández 6 Asts: Garuba 7	Attendance: 14,073; Referees: Ademir Zurapović (BIH), Boris Krejić (SLO), Kerem Baki (TUR)

== Third place game ==
18 September 2022	Germany	82–69	Poland	Mercedes-Benz Arena, Berlin
17:15	Scoring by quarter: 19–14, 17–9, 18–26, 28–20
	Pts: Schröder 26; Rebs: Voigtmann 9 Asts: Voigtmann 6	Boxscore	Pts: Sokołowski 18; Rebs: Sokołowski 6 Asts: Slaughter 10	Attendance: 12,913; Referees: Antonio Conde (ESP), Yohan Rosso (FRA), Kerem Baki (TUR)

== Final ==
18 September 2022	Spain	88–76	France	Mercedes-Benz Arena, Berlin
20:30	Scoring by quarter: 23–14, 24–23, 19–20, 22–19
	Pts: J. Hernangómez 27; Rebs: W. Hernangómez 8 Asts: Brown 11	Boxscore	Pts: Fournier 23; Rebs: Tarpey 9 Asts: Heurtel 7	Attendance: 13,042; Referees: Ademir Zurapović (BIH), Boris Krejić (SLO), Mārtiņš Kozlovskis (LAT)
