= EuroBasket 2022 Group B =

Group B of EuroBasket 2022 consisted of Bosnia and Herzegovina, France, Germany, Hungary, Lithuania, and Slovenia. The games were played from 1 to 7 September 2022 at the Lanxess Arena in Cologne, Germany. The top four teams advanced to the knockout stage.

== Teams ==
Team	Qualification method	Date of qualification	App	Last	Best placement in tournament	World Ranking	
Team	Qualification method	Date of qualification	App	Last	Best placement in tournament	March 2021 (Note: The rankings of March 2021 were used for the final draw.)	September 2022
Bosnia and Herzegovina	Group H top three	29 November 2020	10th	2015	8th place (1993)	43	46
France	Group G top two	20 February 2021	39th	2017	Champions (2013)	7	4
Germany	Host nation	15 July 2019	25th	2017	Champions (1993)	17	11
Hungary	Group F top three	19 February 2021	16th	2017	Champions (1955)	38	43
Lithuania	Group C top three	22 February 2021	15th	2017	Champions (1937, 1939, 2003)	8	8
Slovenia	Group F top three	30 November 2020	14th	2017	Champions (2017)	16	5

== Standings ==
Pos	Team	Pld	W	L	PF	PA	PD	Pts	Qualification
1	Slovenia	5	4	1	464	432	+32	9 (Note: Slovenia 88–80 Germany)	Knockout stage
2	Germany (H)	5	4	1	463	411	+52	9	Knockout stage
3	France	5	3	2	381	379	+2	8	Knockout stage
4	Lithuania	5	2	3	439	412	+27	7 (Note: Lithuania 87–70 Bosnia and Herzegovina)	Knockout stage
5	Bosnia and Herzegovina	5	2	3	412	438	−26	7	
6	Hungary	5	0	5	382	469	−87	5	

Source: FIBA
Rules for classification: 1) Points; 2) Head-to-head results; 3) Points difference; 4) Points scored.
(H) Hosts

== Matches ==
All times are local (UTC+2).

=== Bosnia and Herzegovina vs Hungary ===
1 September 2022	Bosnia and Herzegovina	95–85	Hungary	Lanxess Arena, Cologne
14:30	Scoring by quarter: 17–23, 28–23, 28–17, 22–22
	Pts: Musa, Nurkić 19; Rebs: Halilović 9 Asts: Musa 6	Boxscore	Pts: Benke 20; Rebs: Hanga 7 Asts: Benke 6	Attendance: 14,401; Referees: Marius Ciulin (ROU), Igor Mitrovski (MKD), Ivor Matějek (CZE)

=== Slovenia vs Lithuania ===
1 September 2022	Slovenia	92–85	Lithuania	Lanxess Arena, Cologne
17:15	Scoring by quarter: 27–27, 24–21, 18–19, 23–18
	Pts: Tobey 24; Rebs: Tobey 8 Asts: Dončić 10	Boxscore	Pts: Kuzminskas 19; Rebs: Valančiūnas 12; Asts: Lekavičius 5	Attendance: 14,465; Referees: Manuel Mazzoni (ITA), Mārtiņš Kozlovskis (LAT), Wojciech Liszka (POL)

=== France vs Germany ===
1 September 2022	France	63–76	Germany	Lanxess Arena, Cologne
20:30	Scoring by quarter: 13–17, 18–21, 12–19, 20–19
	Pts: Yabusele 18; Rebs: Gobert 12; Asts: Heurtel 8	Boxscore	Pts: Thiemann 14; Rebs: three players 6 Asts: Lô, Schröder 5	Attendance: 18,017; Referees: Georgios Poursanidis (GRE), Lorenzo Baldini (ITA), Michał Proc (POL)

=== Germany vs Bosnia and Herzegovina ===
3 September 2022	Germany	92–82	Bosnia and Herzegovina	Lanxess Arena, Cologne
14:30	Scoring by quarter: 18–20, 24–27, 28–11, 22–24
	Pts: Schröder, Wagner 18; Rebs: Theis 6 Asts: Schröder 9	Boxscore	Pts: Musa 30; Rebs: Nurkić 7 Asts: three players 4	Attendance: 18,017; Referees: Wojciech Liszka (POL), Lorenzo Baldini (ITA), Marius Ciulin (ROU)

=== Lithuania vs France ===
3 September 2022	Lithuania	73–77	France	Lanxess Arena, Cologne
17:45	Scoring by quarter: 25–23, 16–17, 15–10, 17–27
	Pts: Valančiūnas 15; Rebs: Sabonis 9 Asts: Jokubaitis 5	Boxscore	Pts: Fournier 27; Rebs: Fournier, Yabusele 5 Asts: Albicy 4	Attendance: 18,017; Referees: Manuel Mazzoni (ITA), Michał Proc (POL), Mārtiņš Kozlovskis (LAT)

=== Hungary vs Slovenia ===
3 September 2022	Hungary	88–103	Slovenia	Lanxess Arena, Cologne
20:30	Scoring by quarter: 16–29, 17–25, 27–34, 28–15
	Pts: Perl 18; Rebs: Hopkins, Perl 7 Asts: Perl 6	Boxscore	Pts: Dončić 20; Rebs: Dončić 7 Asts: Dončić 7	Attendance: 18,017; Referees: Georgios Poursanidis (GRE), Andris Aunkrogers (LAT), Ilias Kounelles (CYP)

=== Lithuania vs Germany ===
During the match, Lithuanian star basketballer Valančiūnas drew Maodo Lo's foul and was rewarded with 2 free throws. Seconds later, Germany's head coach Gordon Herbert received a technical foul. According to FIBA rules, the free throw for the technical foul is supposed to be attempted before the two shots for the shooting foul. However, only the two free throws for the regular foul were taken, failing to award Lithuania with additional throw. As a result, Lithuania registered an official complaint with FIBA. On 8 September 2022, FIBA recognized the error of the referees in the match between Lithuania and Germany. The three referees of the Lithuania-Germany game was suspended by FIBA and will not participate in any other game this EuroBasket.

4 September 2022	Lithuania	107–109(2OT)	Germany	Lanxess Arena, Cologne
14:30	Scoring by quarter: 19–19, 22–27, 24–20, 24–23, Overtime: 7–7, 11–13
	Pts: Valančiūnas 34; Rebs: Valančiūnas 14; Asts: Valančiūnas 5	Boxscore	Pts: Wagner 32; Rebs: Wagner 8 Asts: Schröder 8	Attendance: 18,017; Referees: Manuel Mazzoni (ITA), Wojciech Liszka (POL), Michał Proc (POL)

=== Slovenia vs Bosnia and Herzegovina ===
4 September 2022	Slovenia	93–97	Bosnia and Herzegovina	Lanxess Arena, Cologne
17:45	Scoring by quarter: 32–26, 20–23, 21–23, 20–25
	Pts: Čančar 22; Rebs: Dončić 8 Asts: Dončić 8	Boxscore	Pts: Roberson 23; Rebs: Halilović 10; Asts: Musa 5	Attendance: 15,718; Referees: Lorenzo Baldini (ITA), Mārtiņš Kozlovskis (LAT), Igor Mitrovski (MKD)

=== France vs Hungary ===
4 September 2022	France	78–74	Hungary	Lanxess Arena, Cologne
20:30	Scoring by quarter: 21–17, 21–22, 25–14, 11–21
	Pts: Yabusele 17; Rebs: Gobert 9 Asts: Heurtel 7	Boxscore	Pts: Hanga 18; Rebs: Hanga, Váradi 4 Asts: Perl, Váradi 4	Attendance: 15,724; Referees: Marius Ciulin (ROU), Andris Aunkrogers (LAT), Ivor Matějek (CZE)

=== Bosnia and Herzegovina vs France ===
6 September 2022	Bosnia and Herzegovina	68–81	France	Lanxess Arena, Cologne
14:30	Scoring by quarter: 19–19, 15–25, 16–8, 18–29
	Pts: three players 14; Rebs: Nurkić 10; Asts: Atić 5	Boxscore	Pts: Yabusele 15; Rebs: Gobert 12; Asts: Heurtel 8	Attendance: 11,957; Referees: Marius Ciulin (ROU), Georgios Poursanidis (GRE), Ilias Kounelles (CYP)

=== Hungary vs Lithuania ===
6 September 2022	Hungary	64–87	Lithuania	Lanxess Arena, Cologne
17:15	Scoring by quarter: 18–22, 15–26, 19–26, 12–12
	Pts: Perl 16; Rebs: Benke, Perl 4 Asts: four players 2	Boxscore	Pts: Valančiūnas 21; Rebs: Sabonis, Valančiūnas 8 Asts: Jokubaitis 6	Attendance: 12,332; Referees: Aleksandar Glišić (SRB), Andris Aunkrogers (LAT), Igor Mitrovski (MKD)

=== Germany vs Slovenia ===
6 September 2022	Germany	80–88	Slovenia	Lanxess Arena, Cologne
20:30	Scoring by quarter: 14–21, 22–23, 19–17, 25–27
	Pts: Schröder 19; Rebs: Voigtmann 12; Asts: Schröder 5	Boxscore	Pts: Dončić 36; Rebs: Dončić 10; Asts: Dončić 4	Attendance: 18,017; Referees: Mārtiņš Kozlovskis (LAT), Lorenzo Baldini (ITA), Martin Horozov (BUL)

=== Lithuania vs Bosnia and Herzegovina ===
7 September 2022	Lithuania	87–70	Bosnia and Herzegovina	Lanxess Arena, Cologne
14:30	Scoring by quarter: 28–28, 28–14, 19–17, 12–11
	Pts: Grigonis 16; Rebs: Valančiūnas 15; Asts: Valančiūnas 5	Boxscore	Pts: Musa 22; Rebs: Kamenjaš 6 Asts: Musa 5	Attendance: 12,877; Referees: Mārtiņš Kozlovskis (LAT), Lorenzo Baldini (ITA), Martin Horozov (BUL)

=== France vs Slovenia ===
7 September 2022	France	82–88	Slovenia	Lanxess Arena, Cologne
17:15	Scoring by quarter: 19–20, 21–24, 24–20, 18–24
	Pts: Gobert 19; Rebs: Gobert 8 Asts: Heurtel 10	Boxscore	Pts: Dončić 47; Rebs: Dončić 7 Asts: Dončić 5	Attendance: 13,426; Referees: Aleksandar Glisić (SRB), Marius Ciulin (ROU), Georgios Poursanidis (GRE)

=== Hungary vs Germany ===
7 September 2022	Hungary	71–106	Germany	Lanxess Arena, Cologne
20:30	Scoring by quarter: 19–22, 20–32, 19–27, 13–25
	Pts: Perl 15; Rebs: Perl 4 Asts: Perl, Vojvoda 4	Boxscore	Pts: Sengfelder 22; Rebs: Voigtmann 10; Asts: Hollatz 11	Attendance: 17,513; Referees: Andris Aunkrogers (LAT), Ivor Matějek (CZE), Ilias Kounelles (CYP)
