= EuroBasket 2022 Group D =

Group D of EuroBasket 2022 consisted of Czech Republic, Finland, Israel, Netherlands, Poland, and Serbia. The games were played from 2 to 8 September 2022 at the O2 Arena in Prague, Czech Republic. The top four teams advanced to the knockout stage.

== Teams ==
Team	Qualification method	Date of qualification	App	Last	Best placement in tournament	World Ranking	
Team	Qualification method	Date of qualification	App	Last	Best placement in tournament	March 2021 (Note: The rankings of March 2021 were used for the final draw.)	September 2022
Czech Republic	Host nation	15 July 2019	6th	2017	7th place (2015)	12	12
Finland	Group E top three	19 February 2021	17th	2017	6th place (1967)	32	35
Israel	Group A top three	30 November 2020	30th	2017	Runners-up (1979)	39	42
Netherlands	Group D top three	20 February 2021	16th	2015	Fourth place (1983)	44	47
Poland	Group A top three	19 February 2021	29th	2017	Runners-up (1963)	13	13
Serbia	Group E top three	19 February 2021	7th	2017	Runners-up (2009, 2017)	5	6

== Standings ==
Pos	Team	Pld	W	L	PF	PA	PD	Pts	Qualification
1	Serbia	5	5	0	466	361	+105	10	Knockout stage
2	Finland	5	3	2	432	403	+29	8 (Note: Finland 89–59 Poland)	Knockout stage
3	Poland	5	3	2	387	414	−27	8	Knockout stage
4	Czech Republic (H)	5	2	3	416	435	−19	7 (Note: Czech Republic 88–77 Israel)	Knockout stage
5	Israel	5	2	3	394	416	−22	7	
6	Netherlands	5	0	5	359	425	−66	5	

Source: FIBA
Rules for classification: 1) Points; 2) Head-to-head results; 3) Points difference; 4) Points scored.
(H) Hosts

== Matches ==
All times are local (UTC+2).

=== Israel vs Finland ===
2 September 2022	Israel	89–87(OT)	Finland	O2 Arena, Prague
14:00	Scoring by quarter: 16–27, 24–13, 21–18, 18–21, Overtime: 10–8
	Pts: Avdija 23; Rebs: Avdija 15; Asts: Blatt 10	Boxscore	Pts: Markkanen 33; Rebs: Markkanen 12; Asts: Kantonen 4	Attendance: 5,298; Referees: Ademir Zurapović (BIH), Ventsislav Velikov (BUL), Péter Praksch (HUN)

=== Poland vs Czech Republic ===
2 September 2022	Poland	99–84	Czech Republic	O2 Arena, Prague
17:30	Scoring by quarter: 29–18, 17–28, 23–17, 30–21
	Pts: Ponitka 26; Rebs: Balcerowski, Sokołowski 7 Asts: Ponitka 9	Boxscore	Pts: Veselý 17; Rebs: Balvín 5 Asts: Satoranský 6	Attendance: 10,992; Referees: Antonio Conde (ESP), Boris Krejić (SLO), Fernando Calatrava (ESP)

=== Serbia vs Netherlands ===
2 September 2022	Serbia	100–76	Netherlands	O2 Arena, Prague
21:00	Scoring by quarter: 31–21, 20–17, 24–23, 25–15
	Pts: Jokić 19; Rebs: Jokić, Ristić 6 Asts: Micić 12	Boxscore	Pts: De Jong 28; Rebs: Haarms 6 Asts: Van der Vuurst de Vries 4	Attendance: 4,808; Referees: Yener Yılmaz (TUR), Gvidas Gedvilas (LTU), Kerem Baki (TUR)

=== Finland vs Poland ===
3 September 2022	Finland	89–59	Poland	O2 Arena, Prague
14:00	Scoring by quarter: 26–16, 18–14, 20–14, 25–15
	Pts: Salin 18; Rebs: three players 5 Asts: Salin 6	Boxscore	Pts: Ponitka, Sokołowski 8 Rebs: Dziewa 6 Asts: Ponitka 5	Attendance: 8,832; Referees: Ademir Zurapović (BIH), Boris Krejić (SLO), Gvidas Gedvilas (LTU)

=== Czech Republic vs Serbia ===
3 September 2022	Czech Republic	68–81	Serbia	O2 Arena, Prague
17:30	Scoring by quarter: 15–20, 10–23, 24–17, 19–21
	Pts: Hruban, Krejčí 13; Rebs: Balvín 9 Asts: Sehnal 7	Boxscore	Pts: Jokić 18; Rebs: Jokić 11; Asts: Micić 6	Attendance: 15,067; Referees: Antonio Conde (ESP), Kerem Baki (TUR), Fernando Calatrava (ESP)

=== Netherlands vs Israel ===
3 September 2022	Netherlands	67–74	Israel	O2 Arena, Prague
21:00	Scoring by quarter: 18–18, 22–14, 11–18, 16–24
	Pts: De Jong 12; Rebs: Kherrazi 6 Asts: Van der Vuurst de Vries 5	Boxscore	Pts: Avdija 21; Rebs: Sorkin 6 Asts: Blatt 4	Attendance: 3,114; Referees: Yener Yılmaz (TUR), Alexandre Deman (FRA), Péter Praksch (HUN)

=== Poland vs Israel ===
5 September 2022	Poland	85–76	Israel	O2 Arena, Prague
14:00	Scoring by quarter: 23–16, 16–17, 29–23, 17–20
	Pts: Slaughter 24; Rebs: Ponitka 9 Asts: Ponitka 7	Boxscore	Pts: Zoosman 18; Rebs: Avdija 8 Asts: Ginat 6	Attendance: 2,159; Referees: Antonio Conde (ESP), Kerem Baki (TUR), Alexandre Deman (FRA)

=== Czech Republic vs Netherlands ===
5 September 2022	Czech Republic	88–80	Netherlands	O2 Arena, Prague
17:30	Scoring by quarter: 24–14, 26–13, 16–30, 22–23
	Pts: Veselý 24; Rebs: Veselý 7 Asts: Kyzlink 9	Boxscore	Pts: Franke 22; Rebs: Edwards 9 Asts: three players 5	Attendance: 8,063; Referees: Ademir Zurapović (BIH), Boris Krejić (SLO), Gintaras Mačiulis (LTU)

=== Serbia vs Finland ===
5 September 2022	Serbia	100–70	Finland	O2 Arena, Prague
21:00	Scoring by quarter: 33–22, 29–12, 14–14, 24–22
	Pts: Micić, Nedović 14; Rebs: Jokić 14; Asts: Jokić, Micić 7	Boxscore	Pts: Markkanen 18; Rebs: Markkanen 7 Asts: Markkanen 5	Attendance: 6,203; Referees: Yener Yılmaz (TUR), Fernando Calatrava (ESP), Gvidas Gedvilas (LTU)

=== Netherlands vs Poland ===
6 September 2022	Netherlands	69–75	Poland	O2 Arena, Prague
14:00	Scoring by quarter: 20–19, 20–12, 15–17, 14–27
	Pts: Kloof 26; Rebs: Haarms, Kherrazi 4 Asts: Kloof, Van der Vuurst de Vries 4	Boxscore	Pts: Sokołowski 24; Rebs: Balcerowski 7 Asts: Ponitka 5	Attendance: 1,867; Referees: Fernando Calatrava (ESP), Ventsislav Velikov (BUL), Péter Praksch (HUN)

=== Finland vs Czech Republic ===
6 September 2022	Finland	98–88	Czech Republic	O2 Arena, Prague
17:30	Scoring by quarter: 29–18, 22–27, 21–14, 26–29
	Pts: Markkanen 34; Rebs: Markkanen 10; Asts: Maxhuni 6	Boxscore	Pts: Hruban 22; Rebs: Veselý 6 Asts: Satoranský 10	Attendance: 10,381; Referees: Antonio Conde (ESP), Boris Krejić (SLO), Kerem Baki (TUR)

=== Israel vs Serbia ===
6 September 2022	Israel	78–89	Serbia	O2 Arena, Prague
21:00	Scoring by quarter: 18–24, 20–26, 20–15, 20–24
	Pts: Madar 20; Rebs: Sorkin 9 Asts: Avdija 5	Boxscore	Pts: Jokić 29; Rebs: Jokić 11; Asts: Jokić 5	Attendance: 3,289; Referees: Ademir Zurapović (BIH), Yener Yılmaz (TUR), Gintaras Mačiulis (LTU)

=== Finland vs Netherlands ===
8 September 2022	Finland	88–67	Netherlands	O2 Arena, Prague
14:00	Scoring by quarter: 26–11, 22–20, 28–18, 12–18
	Pts: Markkanen 22; Rebs: Madsen 6 Asts: Maxhuni 5	Boxscore	Pts: De Jong 21; Rebs: Edwards, Hammink 5 Asts: Van der Vuurst de Vries 5	Attendance: 4,619; Referees: Yener Yılmaz (TUR), Ventsislav Velikov (BUL), Gintaras Mačiulis (LTU)

=== Czech Republic vs Israel ===
8 September 2022	Czech Republic	88–77	Israel	O2 Arena, Prague
17:30	Scoring by quarter: 26–17, 27–20, 14–25, 21–15
	Pts: Hruban 25; Rebs: Satoranský 8 Asts: Satoranský 11	Boxscore	Pts: Madar 16; Rebs: Avdija 8 Asts: Avdija 11	Attendance: 12,174; Referees: Ademir Zurapović (BIH), Boris Krejić (SLO), Gvidas Gedvilas (LTU)

=== Serbia vs Poland ===
8 September 2022	Serbia	96–69	Poland	O2 Arena, Prague
21:00	Scoring by quarter: 28–14, 24–19, 20–17, 24–19
	Pts: Jokić 19; Rebs: Jokić 5 Asts: Micić 9	Boxscore	Pts: Michalak 17; Rebs: Olejniczak 5 Asts: Ponitka 6	Attendance: 4,903; Referees: Antonio Conde (ESP), Kerem Baki (TUR), Fernando Calatrava (ESP)

== See also ==
- 2022 Serbia EuroBasket team
