= EuroBasket 2022 Group C =

Group C of EuroBasket 2022 consisted of Croatia, Estonia, Great Britain, Greece, Italy, and Ukraine. The games were played from 2 to 8 September 2022 at the Mediolanum Forum in Milan, Italy. The top four teams advanced to the knockout stage.

== Teams ==
Team	Qualification method	Date of qualification	App	Last	Best placement in tournament	World Ranking	
Team	Qualification method	Date of qualification	App	Last	Best placement in tournament	March 2021 (Note: The rankings of March 2021 were used for the final draw.)	September 2022
Croatia	Group D top three	29 November 2020	14th	2017	Third place (1993, 1995)	14	21
Estonia	Group B top three	22 February 2021	6th	2015	5th place (1937, 1939)	47	48
Great Britain	Group G top two	20 February 2021	5th	2017	13th place (2009, 2011, 2013)	41	45
Greece	Group H top three	29 November 2020	28th	2017	Champions (1987, 2005)	6	9
Italy	Host nation	15 July 2019	38th	2017	Champions (1983, 1999)	10	10
Ukraine	Group F top three	30 November 2020	9th	2017	6th place (2013)	28	32

== Standings ==
Pos	Team	Pld	W	L	PF	PA	PD	Pts	Qualification
1	Greece	5	5	0	456	391	+65	10	Knockout stage
2	Ukraine	5	3	2	412	396	+16	8 (Note: Ukraine 3 Pts, +6 PD; Croatia 3 Pts, 0 PD; Italy 3 Pts, −6 PD)	Knockout stage
3	Croatia	5	3	2	410	390	+20	8	Knockout stage
4	Italy (H)	5	3	2	408	363	+45	8	Knockout stage
5	Estonia	5	1	4	368	382	−14	6	
6	Great Britain	5	0	5	321	453	−132	5	

Source: FIBA
Rules for classification: 1) Points; 2) Head-to-head results; 3) Points difference; 4) Points scored.
(H) Hosts

== Matches ==
All times are local (UTC+2).

=== Ukraine vs Great Britain ===
2 September 2022	Ukraine	90–61	Great Britain	Mediolanum Forum, Milan
14:15	Scoring by quarter: 22–17, 20–15, 24–12, 24–17
	Pts: Mykhailiuk 17; Rebs: Len 6 Asts: Bliznyuk, Lukashov 5	Boxscore	Pts: Nelson 16; Rebs: Olaseni 9 Asts: Nelson 5	Attendance: 2,596; Referees: Paulo Marques (POR), Zafer Yılmaz (TUR), Zdravko Rutešić (MNE)

=== Croatia vs Greece ===
2 September 2022	Croatia	85–89	Greece	Mediolanum Forum, Milan
17:00	Scoring by quarter: 16–24, 14–22, 32–24, 23–19
	Pts: Smith 23; Rebs: Hezonja 8 Asts: Smith 4	Boxscore	Pts: G. Antetokounmpo, Dorsey 27; Rebs: G. Antetokounmpo 11; Asts: G. Antetokounmpo, Calathes 6	Attendance: 6,844; Referees: Yohan Rosso (FRA), Luis Castillo (ESP), Martin Horozov (BUL)

=== Italy vs Estonia ===
2 September 2022	Italy	83–62	Estonia	Mediolanum Forum, Milan
21:00	Scoring by quarter: 21–18, 31–15, 17–19, 14–10
	Pts: Fontecchio 19; Rebs: Polonara 11; Asts: Spissu 6	Boxscore	Pts: Kriisa 20; Rebs: Jõesaar 4 Asts: Kriisa, Kullamäe 6	Attendance: 10,864; Referees: Nicolas Maestre (FRA), Radomir Vojinović (MNE), Carsten Straube (GER)

=== Great Britain vs Croatia ===
3 September 2022	Great Britain	65–86	Croatia	Mediolanum Forum, Milan
14:15	Scoring by quarter: 17–20, 14–17, 9–35, 25–14
	Pts: Hesson 18; Rebs: Soko 7 Asts: Nelson 6	Boxscore	Pts: three players 15; Rebs: Hezonja 10; Asts: Smith 6	Attendance: 2,373; Referees: Martin Horozov (BUL), Paulo Marques (POR), Geert Jacobs (BEL)

=== Estonia vs Ukraine ===
3 September 2022	Estonia	73–74	Ukraine	Mediolanum Forum, Milan
17:00	Scoring by quarter: 21–15, 14–18, 26–23, 12–18
	Pts: Kotsar 17; Rebs: Kotsar 9 Asts: Kriisa 8	Boxscore	Pts: Mykhailiuk 18; Rebs: Bliznyuk 9 Asts: Bliznyuk 5	Attendance: 4,418; Referees: Nicolas Maestre (FRA), Viola Györgyi (ROU), Zafer Yılmaz (TUR)

=== Greece vs Italy ===
3 September 2022	Greece	85–81	Italy	Mediolanum Forum, Milan
21:00	Scoring by quarter: 23–17, 24–23, 24–17, 14–24
	Pts: G. Antetokounmpo 25; Rebs: G. Antetokounmpo 11; Asts: Calathes 4	Boxscore	Pts: Fontecchio 26; Rebs: Polonara 10; Asts: Spissu 6	Attendance: 11,742; Referees: Yohan Rosso (FRA), Luis Castillo (ESP), Radomir Vojinović (MNE)

=== Croatia vs Estonia ===
5 September 2022	Croatia	73–70	Estonia	Mediolanum Forum, Milan
14:15	Scoring by quarter: 20–16, 13–13, 20–19, 20–22
	Pts: Matković 17; Rebs: Šarić 12; Asts: Smith 7	Boxscore	Pts: Vene 18; Rebs: Drell 7 Asts: Kullamäe 5	Attendance: 2,972; Referees: Paulo Marques (POR), Zafer Yılmaz (TUR), Carsten Straube (GER)

=== Great Britain vs Greece ===
5 September 2022	Great Britain	77–93	Greece	Mediolanum Forum, Milan
17:00	Scoring by quarter: 17–24, 26–22, 17–25, 17–22
	Pts: Nelson 17; Rebs: Olaseni 11; Asts: Soko, Wheatle 5	Boxscore	Pts: Sloukas 21; Rebs: Papanikolaou 7 Asts: four players 5	Attendance: 4,963; Referees: Yohan Rosso (FRA), Geert Jacobs (BEL), Gizella Gyorgyi (ROU)

=== Ukraine vs Italy ===
5 September 2022	Ukraine	84–73	Italy	Mediolanum Forum, Milan
21:00	Scoring by quarter: 16–21, 22–21, 19–15, 27–16
	Pts: Mykhailiuk 25; Rebs: Len 11; Asts: Bliznyuk 6	Boxscore	Pts: Polonara 17; Rebs: Polonara 7 Asts: Spissu 3	Attendance: 6,800; Referees: Luis Castillo (ESP), Martin Horozov (BUL), Zdravko Rutešić (MNE)

=== Estonia vs Great Britain ===
6 September 2022	Estonia	94–62	Great Britain	Mediolanum Forum, Milan
14:15	Scoring by quarter: 24–18, 25–18, 29–17, 16–9
	Pts: Drell 20; Rebs: Kotsar, Raieste 8 Asts: Kriisa 7	Boxscore	Pts: Hesson 14; Rebs: Wheatle 11; Asts: Nelson 6	Attendance: 5,422; Referees: Radomir Vojinović (MNE), Zdravko Rutesić (MNE), Geert Jacobs (BEL)

=== Greece vs Ukraine ===
6 September 2022	Greece	99–79	Ukraine	Mediolanum Forum, Milan
17:00	Scoring by quarter: 23–20, 16–26, 32–11, 28–22
	Pts: G. Antetokounmpo 41; Rebs: G. Antetokounmpo 9 Asts: Calathes 7	Boxscore	Pts: Mykhailiuk, Sanon 16; Rebs: Len 8 Asts: Bliznyuk, Sanon 4	Attendance: 5,484; Referees: Luis Castillo (ESP), Nicolas Maestre (FRA), Carsten Straube (GER)

=== Italy vs Croatia ===
6 September 2022	Italy	81–76	Croatia	Mediolanum Forum, Milan
21:00	Scoring by quarter: 22–17, 20–17, 13–25, 26–17
	Pts: Fontecchio, Melli 19; Rebs: three players 5 Asts: Spissu 6	Boxscore	Pts: Bogdanović 27; Rebs: Hezonja 10; Asts: Smith 4	Attendance: 11,745; Referees: Yohan Rosso (FRA), Paulo Marques (POR), Zafer Yılmaz (TUR)

=== Croatia vs Ukraine ===
8 September 2022	Croatia	90–85	Ukraine	Mediolanum Forum, Milan
14:15	Scoring by quarter: 21–21, 24–21, 22–25, 23–18
	Pts: Bogdanović 27; Rebs: Zubac 8 Asts: Mavra 4	Boxscore	Pts: Gerun 21; Rebs: Bliznyuk 8 Asts: four players 4	Attendance: 2,753; Referees: Luis Castillo (ESP), Nicolas Maestre (FRA), Zafer Yılmaz (TUR)

=== Estonia vs Greece ===
8 September 2022	Estonia	69–90	Greece	Mediolanum Forum, Milan
17:00	Scoring by quarter: 21–27, 15–24, 13–26, 20–13
	Pts: Vene 19; Rebs: Drell 9 Asts: Kriisa, Kullamäe 4	Boxscore	Pts: G. Antetokounmpo 25; Rebs: G. Antetokounmpo 5 Asts: G. Antetokounmpo 4	Attendance: 4,852; Referees: Yohan Rosso (FRA), Carsten Straube (GER), Gizella Gyorgyi (ROU)

=== Great Britain vs Italy ===
8 September 2022	Great Britain	56–90	Italy	Mediolanum Forum, Milan
21:00	Scoring by quarter: 20–29, 17–18, 17–20, 2–23
	Pts: Hesson 18; Rebs: Wheatle 7 Asts: Nelson, Wheatle 3	Boxscore	Pts: Fontecchio 18; Rebs: Ricci 8 Asts: Pajola 5	Attendance: 7,232; Referees: Paulo Marques (POR), Radomir Vojinović (MNE), Geert Jacobs (BEL)
