= Willy Hernangómez =

Spanish basketball player (born 1994)

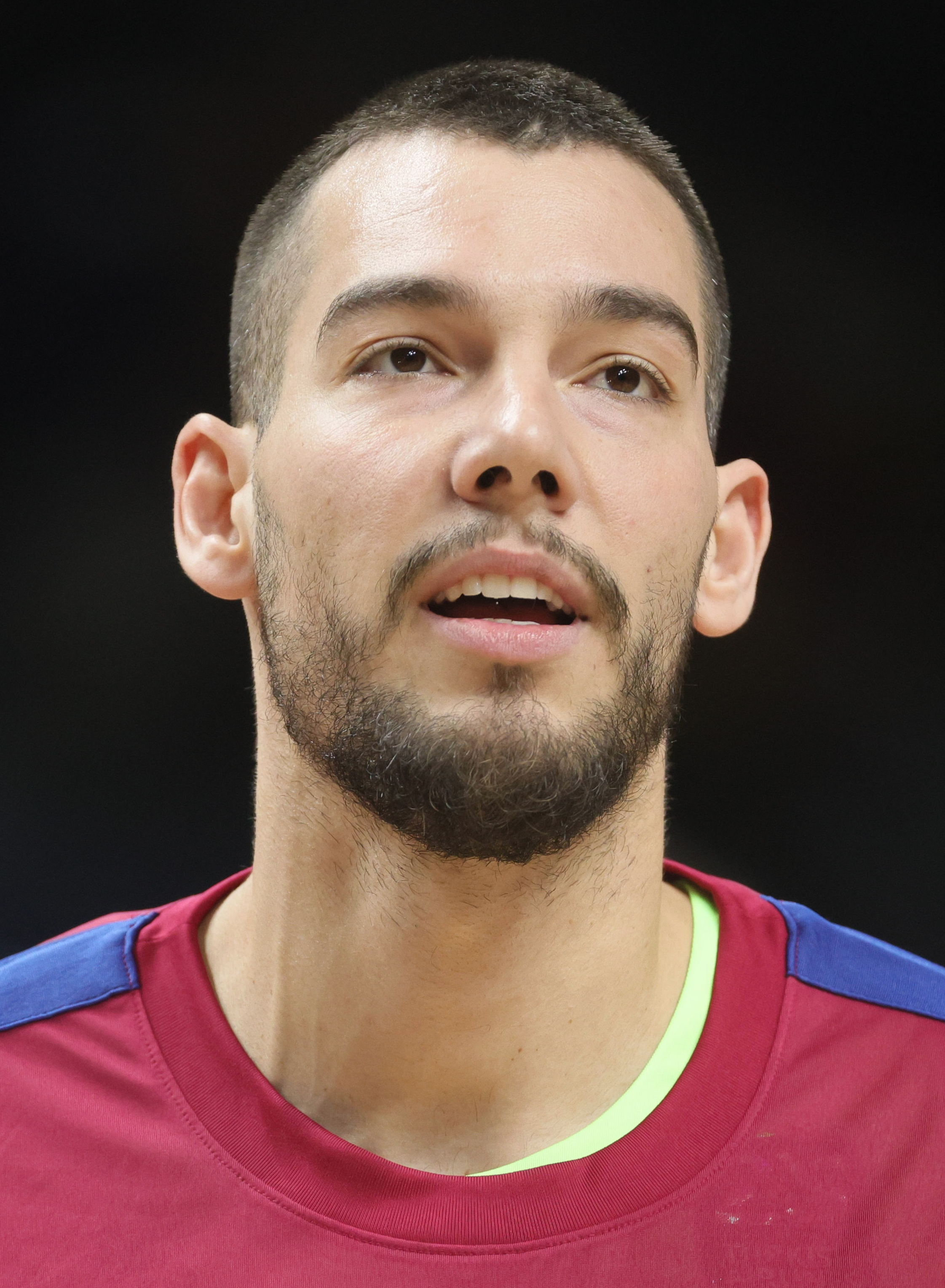
- Hernangómez with FC Barcelona in 2025

No. 41 – Unicaja Málaga
- Position: Center
- League: Liga ACB; BCL

Personal information
- Born: 27 May 1994 (age 32) Madrid, Spain
- Listed height: 6 ft 11 in (2.11 m)
- Listed weight: 250 lb (113 kg)

Career information
- NBA draft: 2015: 2nd round, 35th overall pick
- Drafted by: Philadelphia 76ers
- Playing career: 2011–present

Career history
- 2011–2013: Real Madrid B
- 2013–2016: Real Madrid
- 2013–2015: →Baloncesto Sevilla
- 2016–2018: New York Knicks
- 2018–2020: Charlotte Hornets
- 2020–2023: New Orleans Pelicans
- 2023–2026: FC Barcelona
- 2026–present: Unicaja Málaga

Career highlights
- NBA All-Rookie First Team (2017); FIBA EuroBasket MVP (2022); 2× Liga ACB champion (2013, 2016); Spanish Super Cup champion (2012); FIBA Intercontinental Cup champion (2015); Spanish Cup winner (2016); 2× Catalan League champion (2023, 2024); 2× ACB All-Young Players Team (2015, 2016); Catalan League MVP (2024)
- Stats at NBA.com
- Stats at Basketball Reference
Medals
Men's basketball
Representing Spain
Olympic Games
Bronze medal – third place	2016 Rio de Janeiro	Team
World Cup
Gold medal – first place	2019 China
EuroBasket
Gold medal – first place	2015 France–Croatia–Germany–Latvia
Gold medal – first place	2022 Czech Republic–Georgia–Italy–Germany
Bronze medal – third place	2017 Finland–Israel–Romania–Turkey
U20 European Championship
Silver medal – second place	2014 Greece	Team
U18 European Championship
Gold medal – first place	2011 Poland	Team

Guillermo Gustavo "Willy" Hernangómez Geuer (born 27 May 1994) is a Spanish professional basketball player for Unicaja Málaga of the Spanish Liga ACB and the Basketball Champions League (BCL). Standing at 6 ft 11 in (2.11 m), he plays at the center position.

== Professional career ==
=== Real Madrid (2011–2016) ===
Considered one of the best prospects of Real Madrid, Hernangómez played his first two seasons on its reserve team. In the summer of 2013, Hernangómez was loaned by Real Madrid to Cajasol Sevilla, extending his agreement for one more season in the next summer. On 17 July 2015, he returned to Real Madrid and played for the senior team in 2015–16. In his lone full season for the senior team, he averaged 5.7 points and 3.3 rebounds in 34 games in the Spanish ACB League.

=== New York Knicks (2016–2018) ===
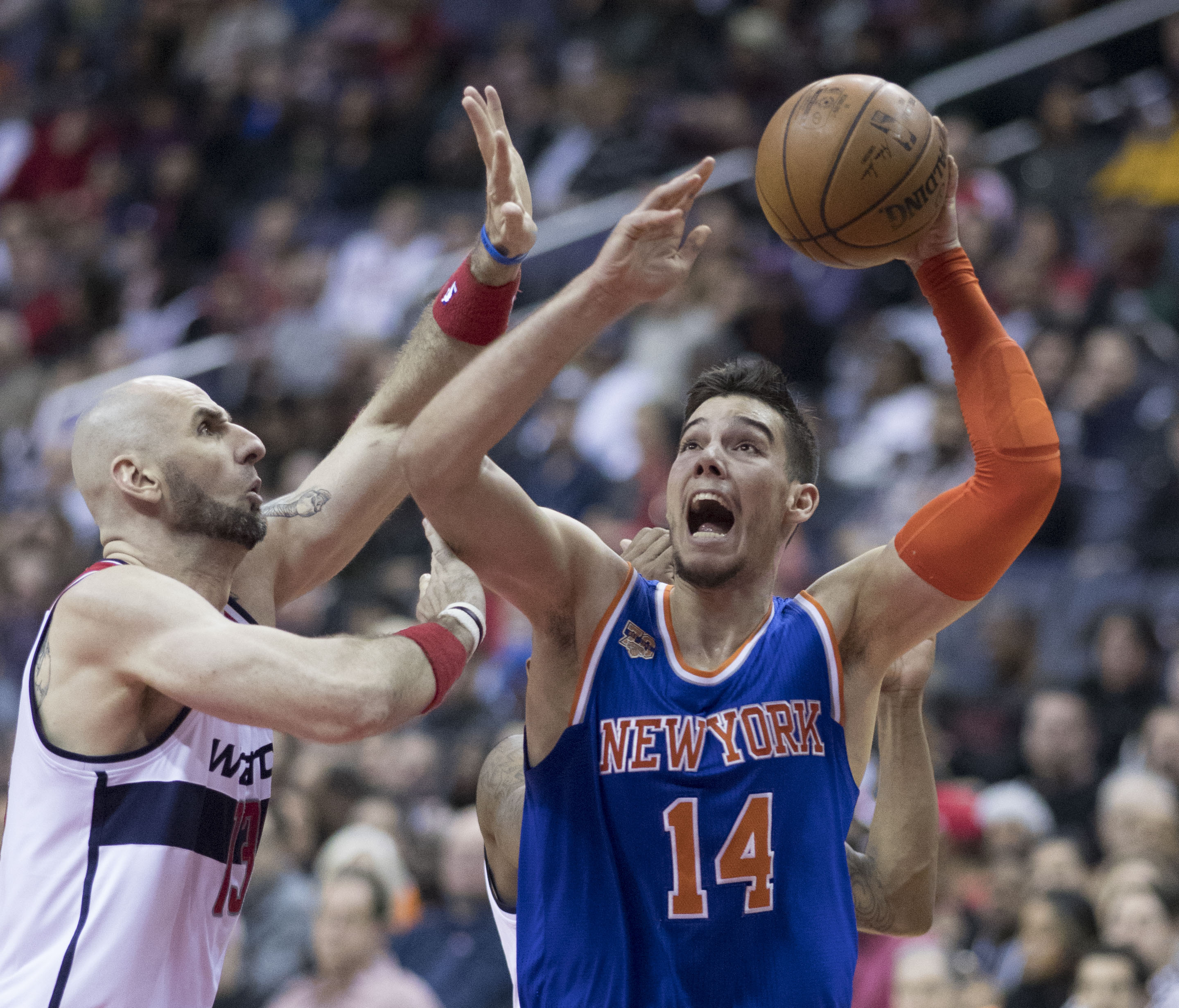
Hernangómez with the Knicks in 2017

Hernangómez declared for the 2015 NBA draft, and was selected with the 35th overall pick by the Philadelphia 76ers. His rights were later traded to the New York Knicks on draft night, in exchange for two future second round draft choices and cash considerations.

On 8 July 2016, Hernangómez signed with the New York Knicks. On 25 October 2016, he made his debut for the Knicks in their season opener, scoring four points in nine minutes off the bench in a 117–88 loss to the Cleveland Cavaliers. On 7 November 2016, he was assigned to the Westchester Knicks, New York's D-League affiliate. He was recalled later that day. Two days later, he had a season-best 14 points in a 110–96 win over the Brooklyn Nets. On 25 January 2017, he had a career-high 16 rebounds in a 103–95 loss to the Dallas Mavericks. On 1 February 2017, he had 16 points and 16 rebounds in a 95–90 win over the Brooklyn Nets. On 15 February, he was named as a replacement on the World Team for the injured Emmanuel Mudiay in 2017 Rising Stars Challenge. On 25 March 2017, he had a career-high 24 points and 13 rebounds in a 106–98 loss to the San Antonio Spurs. On 9 April 2017, he tied his career high with 24 points and grabbed 11 rebounds in a 110–97 loss to the Toronto Raptors. Five days later, he was named Eastern Conference Rookie of the Month for games played in April after leading all Eastern Conference rookies in rebounding (8.5 rpg) and ranked second in scoring (12.5 ppg). At the season's end, he was named to the NBA All-Rookie First Team.

=== Charlotte Hornets (2018–2020) ===
On 7 February 2018, Hernangómez was traded to the Charlotte Hornets in exchange for Johnny O'Bryant III and two future second round draft picks.

=== New Orleans Pelicans (2020–2023) ===
On 30 November 2020, Hernangómez signed with the New Orleans Pelicans.

=== FC Barcelona (2023–2026) ===
On 12 July 2023, Hernangómez signed a lucrative three-year deal with Spanish powerhouse FC Barcelona, after his former club Real Madrid decided not to match the offer sheet as per the domestic league rule of tanteo rights. On 30 June 2026, Hernangómez left Barcelona upon the expiration of his contract.

=== Unicaja Málaga (2026–present) ===
On July 27, 2026, Hernangómez signed a one–year contract with Unicaja Málaga of the Liga ACB and the Basketball Champions League.

== National team career ==
=== Junior national team ===
As a member of the junior national teams of Spain, Hernangómez played at the 2012 Albert Schweitzer Tournament, where he was named to the All-Tournament Team. He also played at the 2011 FIBA Europe Under-18 Championship, where he won a gold medal, and at the 2014 FIBA Europe Under-20 Championship, where he won a silver medal, and was named to the All-Tournament Team.

=== Senior national team ===
He has also been a member of the senior Spain national basketball team. With Spain's senior national team, he played at the EuroBasket 2015, where he won a gold medal, and at the 2016 Summer Olympics, where he won a bronze medal. He also played at the EuroBasket 2017, where he won a bronze medal. In 2019 FIBA World Cup, he won another gold medal.

At EuroBasket 2022, Hernangómez and Spain won a surprising gold medal after defeating France in the final, in which he had 14 points and 8 rebounds. Hernangómez was named the EuroBasket MVP after averaging 17.2 points and 6.9 rebounds over the tournament.

== Career statistics ==
Legend
GP	Games played	GS	Games started	MPG	Minutes per game
FG%	Field-goal percentage	3P%	3-point field-goal percentage	FT%	Free-throw percentage
RPG	Rebounds per game	APG	Assists per game	SPG	Steals per game
BPG	Blocks per game	PPG	Points per game	PIR	Performance index rating
**Bold**	Career high

=== NBA ===
==== Regular season ====
Year	Team	GP	GS	MPG	FG%	3P%	FT%	RPG	APG	SPG	BPG	PPG
2016–17	New York	**72**	**22**	**18.4**	.530	.267	.728	7.0	**1.3**	**.6**	**.5**	8.2
2017–18	New York	26	0	9.0	**.605**	.200	.429	2.6	.8	.3	.3	4.3
2017–18	Charlotte	22	1	11.9	.506	**.571**	.758	5.3	.5	.5	.4	6.1
2018–19	Charlotte	58	3	14.0	.519	.385	.694	5.4	1.0	.3	.3	7.3
2019–20	Charlotte	31	0	12.1	.532	.227	.627	4.3	.9	.3	.2	6.1
2020–21	New Orleans	47	12	18.0	.563	.100	.667	**7.1**	1.1	.5	**.5**	7.8
2021–22	New Orleans	50	8	16.8	.520	.333	.773	6.8	**1.3**	.4	.4	**9.1**
2022–23	New Orleans	38	2	12.1	.527	.273	**.779**	4.7	.9	.4	.3	6.9
Career		344	48	15.0	.533	.306	.713	5.8	1.1	.4	.4	7.3

==== Playoffs ====
Year	Team	GP	GS	MPG	FG%	3P%	FT%	RPG	APG	SPG	BPG	PPG
2022	New Orleans	1	0	2.0	.250	.000	—	2.0	—	—	—	2.0
Career		1	0	2.0	.250	.000	—	2.0	—	—	—	2.0

=== EuroLeague ===
Year	Team	GP	GS	MPG	FG%	3P%	FT%	RPG	APG	SPG	BPG	PPG	PIR
2012–13	Real Madrid	3	0	4.8	.286	—	—	1.0	—	—	—	1.3	-1.3
2015–16	Real Madrid	14	0	11.2	**.643**	.000	.545	3.4	.3	.2	**.6**	4.3	5.6
2023–24	Barcelona	**38**	2	**16.2**	.567	**.364**	**.709**	**4.8**	.4	.4	.4	**11.0**	**12.7**
2024–25	Barcelona	34	**8**	15.5	.641	.000	.673	4.1	**.5**	**.6**	.1	8.2	10.8
Career		89	10	14.5	.599	.333	.688	4.2	.4	.4	.3	8.6	10.4

=== EuroCup ===
Year	Team	GP	GS	MPG	FG%	3P%	FT%	RPG	APG	SPG	BPG	PPG	PIR
2014–15	CDB Sevilla	16	13	16.6	.519	.250	.795	4.6	.7	.9	.3	8.9	10.3
Career		16	13	16.6	.519	.250	.795	4.6	.7	.9	.3	8.9	10.3

=== Domestic leagues ===
Year	Team	League	GP	MPG	FG%	3P%	FT%	RPG	APG	SPG	BPG	PPG
2012–13	(Spain) Real Madrid	ACB	6	3.7	.182	—	.600	.8	—	.7	.2	1.7
2013–14	(Spain) CDB Sevilla	ACB	37	13.7	.577	.000	.659	3.3	.2	.5	.4	6.1
2014–15	(Spain) CDB Sevilla	ACB	34	21.1	.537	.167	.692	6.2	.5	.9	.4	10.6
2015–16	(Spain) Real Madrid	ACB	34	11.3	.650	—	.731	3.3	.4	.4	.5	5.7
2023–24	(Spain) Barcelona	ACB	37	19.1	.560	—	.583	6.2	.8	.5	.5	12.2

== Awards and accomplishments ==
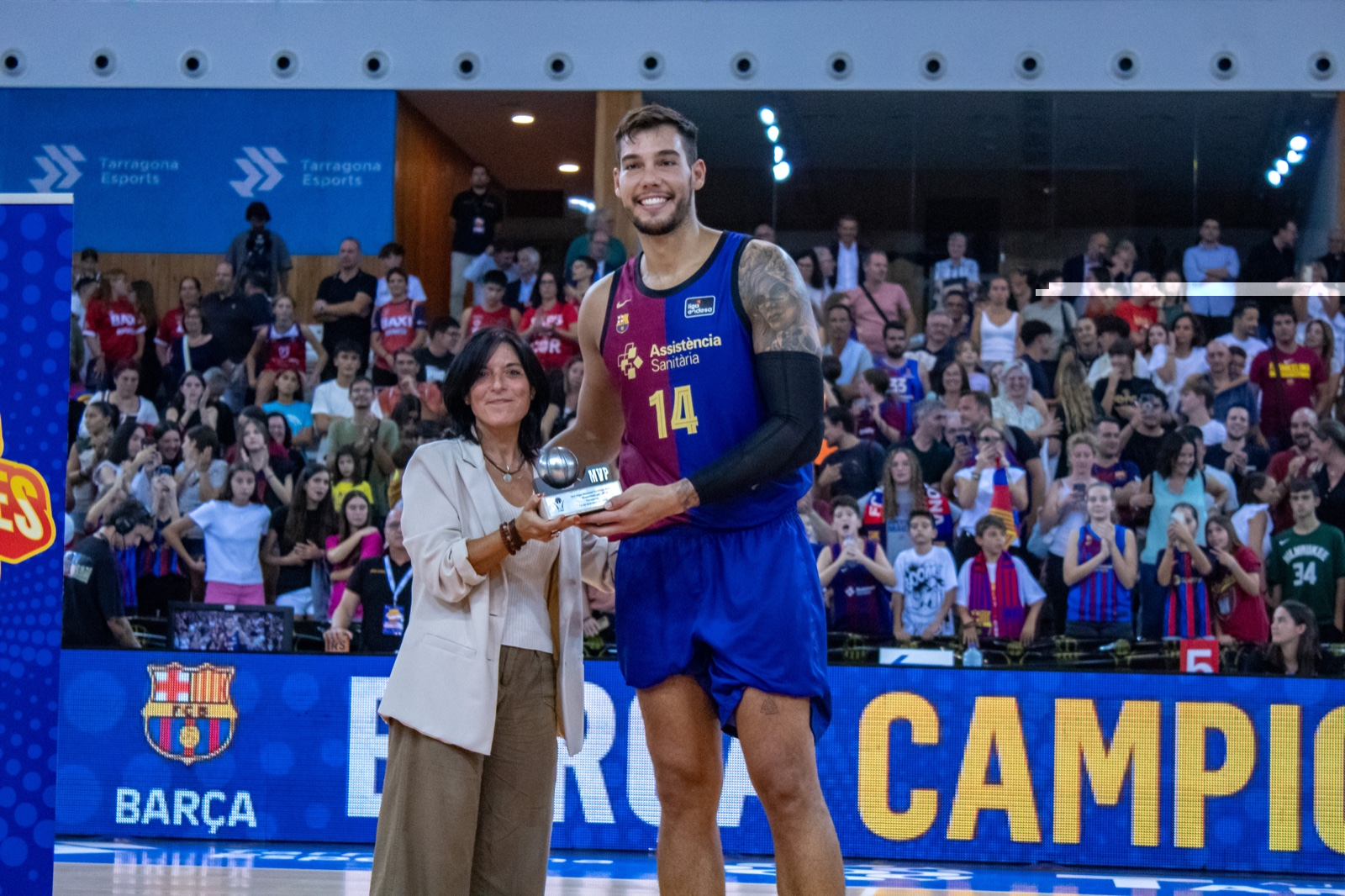
Hernangómez winning the MVP trophy of the 2024 Catalan Basketball League final

=== Club honours ===
- Liga ACB (Spanish League): 2013, 2016
- Copa del Rey (Spanish Cup): 2016
- Supercopa de España (Spanish Supercup): 2012
- FIBA Intercontinental Cup: 2015

=== Spain national team ===
- EuroBasket 2015: Gold
- 2016 Summer Olympics: Bronze
- EuroBasket 2017: Bronze
- 2019 World Cup: Gold
- EuroBasket 2022: Gold

=== Individual ===
- 2012 Albert Schweitzer Tournament: All-Tournament Team
- 2014 FIBA Europe Under-20 Championship: All-Tournament Team
- EuroCup MVP of the Week (2014–15 Week 8)
- 2015 and 2016 ACB All-Young players Team
- 2017 NBA All-Rookie First Team
- 2022 EuroBasket MVP
- 2022 EuroBasket All-Tournament Team
- Catalan League MVP (2024)

== Personal life ==
Hernangómez is a son of Guillermo Hernangómez Heredero and Margarita "Wonny" Geuer Draeger. His mother Margarita was born in Seville and is of German origin. His brother Juancho Hernangómez also played for the NBA, and is also a professional basketball player who is currently playing for Greek giants Panathinaikos.
