= EuroBasket 2022 =

International basketball event

Mistrovství Evropy v basketbalu mužů 2022 (in Czech) ევრობასკეტი 2022 (in Georgian) Campionato europeo maschile di pallacanestro 2022 (in Italian) Basketball-Europameisterschaft 2022 (in German)

Tournament details
- Host countries: Czech Republic; Georgia; Italy; Germany
- Dates: 1–18 September 2022
- Teams: 24
- Venues: 5 (in 5 host cities)

Final positions
- Champions: Spain (4th title)
- Runners-up: France
- Third place: Germany
- Fourth place: Poland

Tournament statistics
- Games played: 76
- Attendance: 651,000 (8,566 per game)
- MVP: (Spain) Willy Hernangómez
- Top scorer: (Greece) Giannis Antetokounmpo (29.3 ppg)
- Top rebounds: (Bulgaria) Aleksandar Vezenkov (12.2 rpg)
- Top assists: (Bulgaria) Dee Bost (8.4 apg)
- PPG (Team): Greece (92.3 ppg)
- RPG (Team): Lithuania (42.0 rpg)
- APG (Team): Czech Republic (25.2 apg)

Official website
- www.fiba.basketball

The EuroBasket 2022 was the 41st edition of the EuroBasket championship organized by FIBA Europe. It was the first since it was agreed it would take place every four years, with a similar system of qualification as for the FIBA Basketball World Cup. It was originally scheduled to take place between 2 and 19 September 2021, but due to the COVID-19 pandemic and the subsequent postponement of the 2020 Summer Olympics to 2021, it was postponed to September 2022.

Like the previous two editions, the tournament was co-hosted by four countries. Games in the group stage were held in the Czech Republic, Georgia, Germany, and Italy. The knock-out phase was played in Berlin, Germany.

The tournament featured three All-NBA First Team members, Nikola Jokić (Serbia), Giannis Antetokounmpo (Greece) and Luka Dončić (Slovenia), making it one of the most anticipated tournaments in EuroBasket history.

Spain won the final against France, achieving its fourth EuroBasket title in the last six tournaments. Germany secured the bronze medal on home soil after defeating Poland.

== Host selection ==
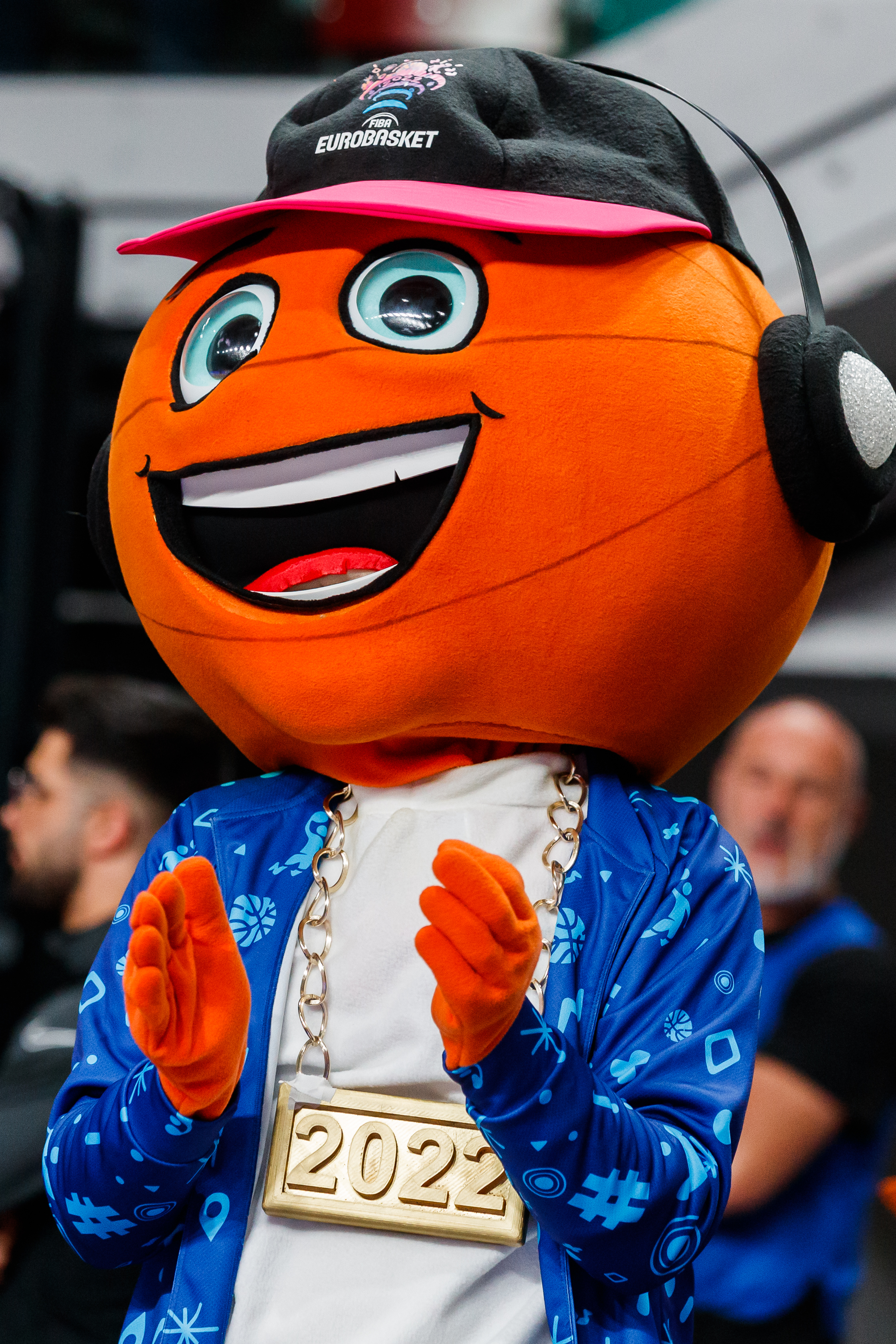
Bounce is the official mascot of the EuroBasket 2022.

For EuroBasket 2015 and 2017, FIBA Europe opened three bidding options for hosting: to host a preliminary group, to host the final round, or to host the entire tournament. In the end, each of these two tournaments was hosted in four cities in four countries. It was hosted by four nations for the third time.

Seven countries submitted separate candidacies to host Eurobasket 2022:

- Czech Republic (Prague)
- Estonia (Tallinn)
- Georgia (Tbilisi)
- Germany (Cologne, group stage, and Berlin, final)
- Hungary (Budapest)
- Italy (Milan)
- Slovenia (Ljubljana)

Czech Republic, Georgia, Germany and Italy were selected as host countries on 15 July 2019 at the Central Board in Munich, Germany.

== Venues ==
Berlin	EuroBasket 2022 (Europe)	
Mercedes-Benz Arena	EuroBasket 2022 (Europe)	
Capacity: 14,500	EuroBasket 2022 (Europe)	
Cologne	EuroBasket 2022 (Europe)	
Lanxess Arena	EuroBasket 2022 (Europe)	
Capacity: 19,500	EuroBasket 2022 (Europe)	
Milan	Prague	Tbilisi
Forum di Milano	O2 Arena	Tbilisi Arena
Capacity: 12,700	Capacity: 16,805	Capacity: 10,000

== Qualification ==
The qualification started in November 2017, with nine teams participating in the pre-qualifiers, including the five eliminated teams from the 2019 World Cup European Pre-Qualifiers. The co-hosts (Czech Republic, Georgia, Germany and Italy) participated in qualifiers, despite having already qualified to the EuroBasket 2022. After the 2022 Russian invasion of Ukraine, Russia was expelled from the tournament and replaced by Montenegro.

=== Qualified teams ===
Team	Qualification method	Date of qualification	App	Last	Best placement in tournament
Czech Republic	Host nation	15 July 2019	6th	2017	7th place (2015)
Georgia	Host nation	15 July 2019	5th	2017	11th place (2011)
Germany	Host nation	15 July 2019	25th	2017	Champions (1993)
Italy	Host nation	15 July 2019	38th	2017	Champions (1983, 1999)
Croatia	Group D top three	29 November 2020	14th	2017	Third place (1993, 1995)
Greece	Group H top three	29 November 2020	28th	2017	Champions (1987, 2005)
Bosnia and Herzegovina	Group H top three	29 November 2020	10th	2015	8th place (1993)
Israel	Group A top three	30 November 2020	30th	2017	Runners-up (1979)
Spain	Group A top three	30 November 2020	32nd	2017	Champions (2009, 2011, 2015)
Slovenia	Group F top three	30 November 2020	14th	2017	Champions (2017)
Ukraine	Group F top three	30 November 2020	9th	2017	6th place (2013)
~~Russia~~	Group B top three	19 February 2021	14th	2017	Champions (2007)
Serbia	Group E top three	19 February 2021	7th	2017	Runners-up (2009, 2017)
Finland	Group E top three	19 February 2021	17th	2017	6th place (1967)
Poland	Group A top three	19 February 2021	29th	2017	Runners-up (1963)
Hungary	Group F top three	19 February 2021	16th	2017	Champions (1955)
Belgium	Group C top three	20 February 2021	18th	2017	Fourth place (1947)
Netherlands	Group D top three	20 February 2021	16th	2015	Fourth place (1983)
Turkey	Group D top three	20 February 2021	25th	2017	Runners-up (2001)
Bulgaria	Group H top three	20 February 2021	25th	2011	Runners-up (1957)
France	Group G top two	20 February 2021	39th	2017	Champions (2013)
Great Britain	Group G top two	20 February 2021	5th	2017	13th place (2009, 2011, 2013)
Estonia	Group B top three	22 February 2021	6th	2015	5th place (1937, 1939)
Lithuania	Group C top three	22 February 2021	15th	2017	Champions (1937, 1939, 2003)
Montenegro	Replacement	20 May 2022	4th	2017	13th place (2017)

== Marketing ==
=== Logo ===
The official logo was unveiled on 16 December 2019.

== Draw ==
The draw took place on 29 April 2021 in Berlin, Germany.

Each of the four hosts was granted the right to select a partner federation for commercial and marketing criteria. These teams would automatically be placed into the same group as their chosen partner country.

Host team	Chosen team	Date
Czech Republic	Poland	19 March 2021
Germany	Lithuania	19 March 2021
Georgia	Turkey	7 April 2021
Italy	Estonia	7 April 2021

=== Seedings ===
The 24 qualified teams were seeded according to the FIBA Men's World Ranking.

Pot 1	Pot 2	Pot 3	Pot 4	Pot 5	Pot 6
Spain (2); Serbia (5); Greece (6); France (7)	Lithuania (8); ~~Russia~~ (9); Italy (10); Czech Republic (12)	Poland (13); Croatia (14); Turkey (15); Slovenia (16)	Germany (17); Ukraine (28); Finland (32); Georgia (36)	Belgium (37); Hungary (38); Israel (39); Great Britain (41)	Bosnia and Herzegovina (43); Netherlands (44); Estonia (47); Bulgaria (49)

Russia was replaced by Montenegro.

== Referees ==
The following 44 referees were selected for the tournament.

- (Belgium) Geert Jacobs
- (Bosnia and Herzegovina) Ademir Zurapović
- (Bulgaria) Martin Horozov
- (Bulgaria) Ventsislav Velikov
- (Croatia) Martin Vulić
- (Cyprus) Ilias Kounelles
- (Czech Republic) Ivor Matějek
- (Estonia) Mihkel Männiste
- (France) Alexandre Deman
- (France) Nicolas Maestre
- (France) Yohan Rosso
- (Germany) Carsten Straube
- (Greece) Georgios Poursanidis
- (Hungary) Péter Praksch
- (Israel) Erez Gurion
- (Italy) Beniamino Attard
- (Italy) Lorenzo Baldini
- (Italy) Saverio Lanzarini
- (Italy) Manuel Mazzoni (suspended after Lithuania-Germany match)
- (Latvia) Andris Aunkrogers
- (Latvia) Mārtiņš Kozlovskis
- (Latvia) Oskars Lūcis
- (Latvia) Gatis Saliņš
- (Lithuania) Gvidas Gedvilas
- (Lithuania) Gintaras Mačiulis
- (Montenegro) Zdravko Rutešić
- (Montenegro) Radomir Vojinović
- (North Macedonia) Igor Mitrovski
- (Norway) Viola Györgyi
- (Poland) Wojciech Liszka (suspended after Lithuania-Germany match)
- (Poland) Michał Proc (suspended after Lithuania-Germany match)
- (Poland) Dariusz Zapolski
- (Portugal) Paulo Marques
- (Romania) Marius Ciulin
- (Serbia) Aleksandar Glišić
- (Slovakia) Zdenko Tomašovič
- (Slovenia) Boris Krejić
- (Spain) Fernando Calatrava
- (Spain) Luis Castillo
- (Spain) Antonio Conde
- (Turkey) Kerem Baki
- (Turkey) Yener Yılmaz
- (Turkey) Zafer Yılmaz
- (Ukraine) Serhiy Zashchuk

The following 8 commissioners were selected for the tournament:

- (Portugal) Bruno Casinha
- (Cyprus) Antonis Demetriou
- (United Kingdom) Martin Ford
- (Denmark) Thomas Frydendal
- (Greece) Andreas Papadopoulos
- (Bulgaria) Eleonora Rangelova
- (Sweden) Jovan Skundric
- (Luxembourg) Alain Steffes

== Preliminary round ==
=== Group A ===
Pos	Team	Pld	W	L	PF	PA	PD	Pts	Qualification
1	Spain	5	4	1	431	368	+63	9	Knockout stage
2	Turkey	5	3	2	403	378	+25	8 (Note: Turkey 4 Pts; Montenegro 3 Pts; Belgium 2 Pts)	Knockout stage
3	Montenegro	5	3	2	381	378	+3	8	Knockout stage
4	Belgium	5	3	2	384	383	+1	8	Knockout stage
5	Bulgaria	5	1	4	427	475	−48	6 (Note: Bulgaria 92–80 Georgia)	
6	Georgia (H)	5	1	4	381	425	−44	6	

Source: FIBA
Rules for classification: 1) Points; 2) Head-to-head results; 3) Points difference; 4) Points scored.
(H) Hosts
Notes:

1 September 2022
Spain	114–87		Bulgaria
Turkey	72–68		Montenegro
Belgium	79–76	OT	Georgia
3 September 2022
Montenegro	76–70		Belgium
Bulgaria	87–101		Turkey
Georgia	64–90		Spain
4 September 2022
Bulgaria	81–91		Montenegro
Spain	73–83		Belgium
Turkey	83–88	2OT	Georgia
6 September 2022
Belgium	63–78		Turkey
Montenegro	65–82		Spain
Georgia	80–92		Bulgaria
7 September 2022
Turkey	69–72		Spain
Bulgaria	80–89		Belgium
Georgia	73–81		Montenegro

=== Group B ===
Pos	Team	Pld	W	L	PF	PA	PD	Pts	Qualification
1	Slovenia	5	4	1	464	432	+32	9 (Note: Slovenia 88–80 Germany)	Knockout stage
2	Germany (H)	5	4	1	463	411	+52	9	Knockout stage
3	France	5	3	2	381	379	+2	8	Knockout stage
4	Lithuania	5	2	3	439	412	+27	7 (Note: Lithuania 87–70 Bosnia and Herzegovina)	Knockout stage
5	Bosnia and Herzegovina	5	2	3	412	438	−26	7	
6	Hungary	5	0	5	382	469	−87	5	

Source: FIBA
Rules for classification: 1) Points; 2) Head-to-head results; 3) Points difference; 4) Points scored.
(H) Hosts
Notes:

1 September 2022
Bosnia and Herzegovina	95–85		Hungary
Slovenia	92–85		Lithuania
France	63–76		Germany
3 September 2022
Germany	92–82		Bosnia and Herzegovina
Lithuania	73–77		France
Hungary	88–103		Slovenia
4 September 2022
Lithuania	107–109	2OT	Germany
Slovenia	93–97		Bosnia and Herzegovina
France	78–74		Hungary
6 September 2022
Bosnia and Herzegovina	68–81		France
Hungary	64–87		Lithuania
Germany	80–88		Slovenia
7 September 2022
Lithuania	87–70		Bosnia and Herzegovina
France	82–88		Slovenia
Hungary	71–106		Germany

=== Group C ===
Pos	Team	Pld	W	L	PF	PA	PD	Pts	Qualification
1	Greece	5	5	0	456	391	+65	10	Knockout stage
2	Ukraine	5	3	2	412	396	+16	8 (Note: Ukraine 3 Pts, +6 PD; Croatia 3 Pts, 0 PD; Italy 3 Pts, −6 PD)	Knockout stage
3	Croatia	5	3	2	410	390	+20	8	Knockout stage
4	Italy (H)	5	3	2	408	363	+45	8	Knockout stage
5	Estonia	5	1	4	368	382	−14	6	
6	Great Britain	5	0	5	321	453	−132	5	

Source: FIBA
Rules for classification: 1) Points; 2) Head-to-head results; 3) Points difference; 4) Points scored.
(H) Hosts
Notes:

2 September 2022
Ukraine	90–61	Great Britain
Croatia	85–89	Greece
Italy	83–62	Estonia
3 September 2022
Great Britain	65–86	Croatia
Estonia	73–74	Ukraine
Greece	85–81	Italy
5 September 2022
Croatia	73–70	Estonia
Great Britain	77–93	Greece
Ukraine	84–73	Italy
6 September 2022
Estonia	94–62	Great Britain
Greece	99–79	Ukraine
Italy	81–76	Croatia
8 September 2022
Croatia	90–85	Ukraine
Estonia	69–90	Greece
Great Britain	56–90	Italy

=== Group D ===
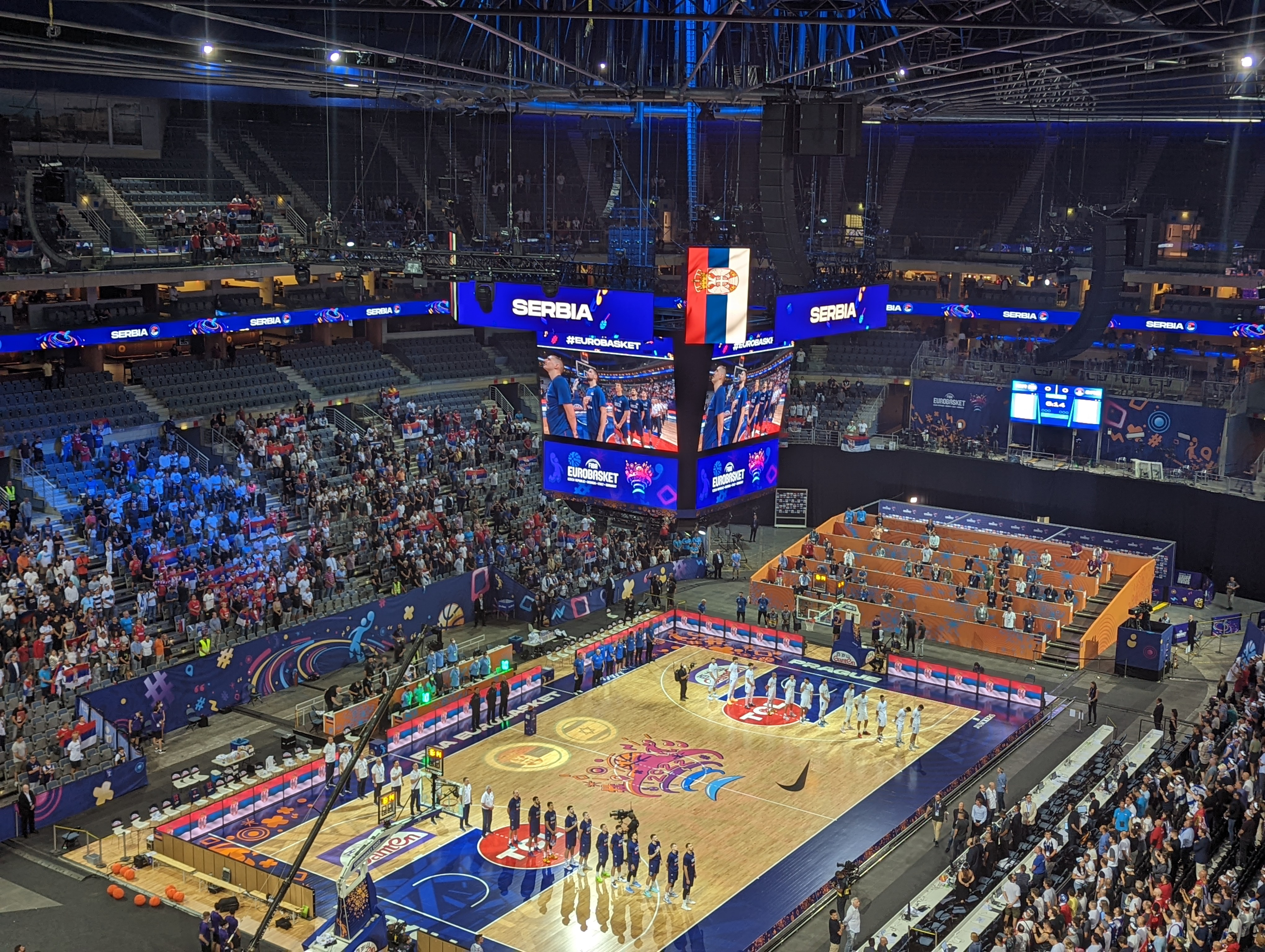
Serbia against Israel

Pos	Team	Pld	W	L	PF	PA	PD	Pts	Qualification
1	Serbia	5	5	0	466	361	+105	10	Knockout stage
2	Finland	5	3	2	432	403	+29	8 (Note: Finland 89–59 Poland)	Knockout stage
3	Poland	5	3	2	387	414	−27	8	Knockout stage
4	Czech Republic (H)	5	2	3	416	435	−19	7 (Note: Czech Republic 88–77 Israel)	Knockout stage
5	Israel	5	2	3	394	416	−22	7	
6	Netherlands	5	0	5	359	425	−66	5	

Source: FIBA
Rules for classification: 1) Points; 2) Head-to-head results; 3) Points difference; 4) Points scored.
(H) Hosts
Notes:

2 September 2022
Israel	89–87	OT	Finland
Poland	99–84		Czech Republic
Serbia	100–76		Netherlands
3 September 2022
Finland	89–59		Poland
Czech Republic	68–81		Serbia
Netherlands	67–74		Israel
5 September 2022
Poland	85–76		Israel
Czech Republic	88–80		Netherlands
Serbia	100–70		Finland
6 September 2022
Netherlands	69–75		Poland
Finland	98–88		Czech Republic
Israel	78–89		Serbia
8 September 2022
Finland	88–67		Netherlands
Czech Republic	88–77		Israel
Serbia	96–69		Poland

== Knockout stage ==
All games are played at the Mercedes-Benz Arena in Berlin, Germany.

=== Bracket ===
Round of 16
10 September
Germany	85
Montenegro	79
11 September
Greece	94
Czech Republic	88
10 September
Spain (OT)	102
Lithuania	94
11 September
Finland	94
Croatia	86
10 September
Slovenia	88
Belgium	72
11 September
Ukraine	86
Poland	94
10 September
Turkey	86
France (OT)	87
11 September
Serbia	86
Italy	94

Quarterfinals
13 September
Germany	107
Greece	96
13 September
Spain	100
Finland	90
14 September
Slovenia	87
Poland	90
14 September
France (OT)	93
Italy	85

Semifinals
16 September
Germany	91
Spain	96
16 September
Poland	54
France	95

Final
18 September
Spain	88
France	76
Third place
18 September
Germany	82
Poland	69

=== Final ===
18 September 2022	Spain	88–76	France	Mercedes-Benz Arena, Berlin
20:30	Scoring by quarter: 23–14, 24–23, 19–20, 22–19
	Pts: J. Hernangómez 27; Rebs: W. Hernangómez 8 Asts: Brown 11	Boxscore	Pts: Fournier 23; Rebs: Tarpey 9 Asts: Heurtel 7	Attendance: 13,042; Referees: Ademir Zurapović (BIH), Boris Krejić (SLO), Mārtiņš Kozlovskis (LAT)

== Final standings ==
Rank	Team	GP	W/L	PF	PA	PD	Pts	FIBA World Rankings		
Rank	Team	GP	W/L	PF	PA	PD	Pts	Before	After	Change
1st place, gold medalist(s)	Spain	9	8–1	817	719	+98	17	2	2	0
2nd place, silver medalist(s)	France	9	6–3	732	692	+40	15	4	5	−1
3rd place, bronze medalist(s)	Germany	9	7–2	828	751	+77	16	11	11	0
4	Poland	9	5–4	694	764	−70	14	13	13	0
Eliminated in Quarterfinals
5	Greece	7	6–1	646	586	+60	13	9	9	0
6	Slovenia	7	5–2	639	594	+45	12	5	7	−2
7	Finland	7	4–3	616	589	+27	11	34	25	+9
8	Italy	7	4–3	587	542	+45	11	10	10	0
Eliminated in Round of 16
9	Serbia	6	5–1	552	455	+97	11	6	6	0
10	Turkey	6	3–3	489	465	+24	9	15	16	−1
11	Ukraine	6	3–3	496	484	+12	9	31	28	+3
12	Croatia	6	3–3	498	490	+8	9	20	23	−3
13	Montenegro	6	3–3	460	463	−3	9	24	18	+6
14	Belgium	6	3–3	456	471	−15	9	36	29	+7
15	Lithuania	6	2–4	533	514	+19	8	8	8	0
16	Czech Republic	6	2–4	504	529	−25	8	12	12	0
Eliminated in Preliminary round fifth place teams
17	Israel	5	2–3	394	416	−22	7	41	33	+8
18	Bosnia and Herzegovina	5	2–3	412	438	−26	7	45	37	+8
19	Estonia	5	1–4	368	382	−14	6	47	44	+3
20	Bulgaria	5	1–4	427	475	−48	6	51	47	+4
Eliminated in Preliminary round sixth place teams
21	Georgia	5	1–4	381	425	−44	6	35	32	+3
22	Netherlands	5	0–5	359	425	−66	5	46	46	0
23	Hungary	5	0–5	382	469	−87	5	42	40	+2
24	Great Britain	5	0–5	321	453	−132	5	44	48	−4

== Statistics and awards ==
=== Statistical leaders ===
==== Players ====
Points

Name	PPG
(Greece) Giannis Antetokounmpo	29.3
(Finland) Lauri Markkanen	27.9
(Bulgaria) Sasha Vezenkov	26.8
(Slovenia) Luka Dončić	26.0
(Germany) Dennis Schröder	22.1

Rebounds

Name	RPG
(Bulgaria) Sasha Vezenkov	12.2
(Georgia (country)) Sandro Mamukelashvili	11.0
(Lithuania) Jonas Valančiūnas	10.5
(Serbia) Nikola Jokić	10.0
(France) Rudy Gobert	9.8

Assists

Name	APG
(Bulgaria) Dee Bost	8.4
(Spain) Lorenzo Brown	7.6
(Serbia) Vasilije Micić	7.5
(Montenegro) Kendrick Perry	7.2
(Germany) Dennis Schröder	7.1

Blocks

Name	BPG
(Bosnia and Herzegovina) Jusuf Nurkić	2.0
(Georgia (country)) Giorgi Shermadini	1.4
(Croatia) Ivica Zubac	1.3
(France) Rudy Gobert	1.2
(Israel) Deni Avdija	1.2
(United Kingdom) Gabriel Olaseni	1.2

Steals

Name	SPG
(Ukraine) Sviatoslav Mykhailiuk	2.2
(Montenegro) Kendrick Perry	2.2
(Slovenia) Luka Dončić	2.0
(Serbia) Nikola Jokić	1.8
(Netherlands) Worthy de Jong	1.8
(Israel) Tomer Ginat	1.8

Efficiency

Name	EFFPG
(Greece) Giannis Antetokounmpo	32.7
(Serbia) Nikola Jokić	31.7
(Bulgaria) Sasha Vezenkov	31.2
(Finland) Lauri Markkanen	30.4
(Slovenia) Luka Dončić	27.1

==== Teams ====
Points

Name	PPG
Greece	92.3
Germany	92.0
Serbia	92.0
Slovenia	91.3
Spain	90.8

Rebounds

Name	RPG
Lithuania	42.0
Croatia	41.0
Georgia	40.6
Slovenia	39.6
Ukraine	37.5

Assists

Name	APG
Czech Republic	25.2
Serbia	22.7
Finland	22.4
Israel	22.2
Italy	21.9

Blocks

Name	BPG
Bosnia and Herzegovina	4.4
Greece	4.3
Georgia	3.8
Ukraine	3.7
France	3.0
Hungary	3.0
Netherlands	3.0

Steals

Name	SPG
Greece	9.1
Italy	9.1
Serbia	8.7
Spain	8.1
Slovenia	7.6

Efficiency

Name	EFFPG
Serbia	112.3
Greece	107.6
Spain	106.3
Germany	102.1
Slovenia	101.7

=== Awards ===
The awards were announced on 19 September 2022.

Award	Player
All-Tournament Team	(Spain) Willy Hernangómez
All-Tournament Team	(Spain) Lorenzo Brown
All-Tournament Team	(France) Rudy Gobert
All-Tournament Team	(Germany) Dennis Schröder
All-Tournament Team	(Greece) Giannis Antetokounmpo
Most Valuable Player	(Spain) Willy Hernangómez

== Turkey–Georgia brawl ==
During the game between Turkey and Georgia in Group A, Furkan Korkmaz and Duda Sanadze were ejected after a scuffle. Korkmaz was reportedly attacked when leaving the arena by Georgian players. The following day, the Turkish federation threatened to leave the tournament. After the game, the Turkish federation also submitted a complaint because the game clock ran for 22 seconds while the game was paused; this complaint was initially dismissed by FIBA.

On 5 September, FIBA opened an investigation and ten days later, on 15 September, announced to have opened "disciplinary proceedings for engaging in unsportsmanlike conduct" against four players.
