= Bosnia and Herzegovina men's national basketball team results (2020–present) =

This is a list of the Bosnia and Herzegovina men's national basketball team results from 2020 to present.

For results prior to 2020, see Bosnia and Herzegovina men's national basketball team results (1993–2019).

== Results and fixtures ==
Win Loss

=== 2020 ===
21 February 2020 EuroBasket 2022 qualifiers	Latvia	61–62	Bosnia and Herzegovina	Riga, Latvia
19:30	Scoring by quarter: 21–17, 15–13, 17–16, 8–16
	Pts: Laksa, Meiers 13; Rebs: Mejeris 11; Asts: Mejeris 6	Boxscore	Pts: Atić 15; Rebs: Atić 6 Asts: Atić 5	Arena: Arena Riga; Attendance: 10,100; Referees: Saverio Lanzarini (ITA), Janusz Calik (POL), Sergei Beliakov (RUS)

24 February 2020 EuroBasket 2022 qualifiers	Bosnia and Herzegovina	65–70	Greece	Tuzla, Bosnia and Herzegovina
20:00	Scoring by quarter: 16–17, 18–23, 9–18, 22–11
	Pts: Milošević 17; Rebs: Halilović 12; Asts: Adamović 4	Boxscore	Pts: Agravanis 17; Rebs: Agravanis, Bochoridis 7 Asts: Bochoridis 5	Arena: Mejdan Sports Center; Attendance: 5,000; Referees: Gentian Cici (ALB), Dariusz Zapolski (POL), Alexey Davydov (RUS)

27 November 2020 EuroBasket 2022 qualifiers	Bosnia and Herzegovina	88–49	Bulgaria	Sarajevo, Bosnia and Herzegovina* (Note: Due to the COVID-19 pandemic, all matches in the November 2020 and February 2021 windows were played behind closed doors in select host cities.)
21:00	Scoring by quarter: 22–11, 23–10, 22–18, 21–10
	Pts: Kamenjaš 12; Rebs: Sulejmanović 11; Asts: Roberson 6	Boxscore	Pts: Bost 13; Rebs: Bost 5 Asts: Bachev, Marinov 2	Arena: Sports Hall Hills; Referees: Marius Ciulin (ROU), Wojciech Liszka (POL), Zdenko Tomašovič (SVK)

29 November 2020 EuroBasket 2022 qualifiers	Bosnia and Herzegovina	79–73	Latvia	Sarajevo, Bosnia and Herzegovina*
21:00	Scoring by quarter: 20–17, 20–11, 20–17, 19–28
	Pts: Kamenjaš 19; Rebs: Kamenjaš 7 Asts: Roberson 5	Boxscore	Pts: Lomažs 19; Rebs: Meiers 9 Asts: Šķēle 6	Arena: Sports Hall Hills; Referees: Eddie Viator (FRA), Michał Proc (POL), Wojciech Liszka (POL)

=== 2021 ===
20 February 2021 EuroBasket 2022 qualifiers	Greece	69–84	Bosnia and Herzegovina	Riga, Latvia*
16:30	Scoring by quarter: 18–26, 19–23, 14–15, 18–20
	Pts: Kavvadas 16; Rebs: Saloustros 7 Asts: Katsivelis 6	Boxscore	Pts: Sulejmanović 23; Rebs: Sulejmanović 13; Asts: Gegić 10	Arena: Arēna Rīga; Referees: Nicolás Maestre (FRA), Marek Kúkelčík (SVK), Thomas Bissuel (FRA)

22 February 2021 EuroBasket 2022 qualifiers	Bulgaria	61–80	Bosnia and Herzegovina	Riga, Latvia*
16:30	Scoring by quarter: 16–19, 22–24, 16–13, 7–24
	Pts: Kostadinov, Zahariev 11; Rebs: Simeonov 5 Asts: Karamfilov 9	Boxscore	Pts: Kamenjaš 17; Rebs: Kamenjaš 14; Asts: Roberson 7	Arena: Arēna Rīga; Referees: Nicolás Maestre (FRA), Andrei Sharapa (BLR), Marek Kúkelčík (SVK)

26 November 2021 2023 FIBA World Cup qualifiers – 1st round	Bosnia and Herzegovina	97–90	Czech Republic	Sarajevo, Bosnia and Herzegovina
20:00	Scoring by quarter: 17–23, 27–33, 31–11, 22–23
	Pts: Musa 21; Rebs: Halilović 7 Asts: Atić, Roberson 4	Boxscore	Pts: Jelínek 31; Rebs: Peterka, Sehnal 6 Asts: Bohačík, Sehnal 4	Arena: Mirza Delibašić Hall; Attendance: 1,000; Referees: Manuel Mazzoni (ITA), Thomas Bissuel (FRA), Tanel Suslov (EST)

29 November 2021 2023 FIBA World Cup qualifiers – 1st round	Bulgaria	75–85	Bosnia and Herzegovina	Botevgrad, Bulgaria
19:00	Scoring by quarter: 19–25, 23–25, 13–19, 20–16
	Pts: Kostov 13; Rebs: Kostov 9 Asts: Karamfilov, Marinov 5	Boxscore	Pts: Halilović 21; Rebs: Sulejmanović 8 Asts: Atić 5	Arena: Arena Botevgrad; Attendance: 1,300; Referees: Fernando Calatrava (ESP), Beniamino Attard (ITA), Ilias Kounelles (CYP)

=== 2022 ===
24 February 2022 2023 FIBA World Cup qualifiers – 1st round	Bosnia and Herzegovina	77–78	Lithuania	Tuzla, Bosnia and Herzegovina
20:00	Scoring by quarter: 21–13, 20–23, 15–24, 21–18
	Pts: Halilović 20; Rebs: Gegić 7 Asts: Musa 6	Boxscore	Pts: Olisevičius 18; Rebs: Butkevičius 7 Asts: Girdžiūnas 5	Arena: Dvorana Mejdan; Attendance: 4,000; Referees: Yohan Rosso (FRA), Kerem Baki (TUR), Lorenzo Baldini (ITA)

27 February 2022 2023 FIBA World Cup qualifiers – 1st round	Lithuania	77–56	Bosnia and Herzegovina	Vilnius, Lithuania
19:30	Scoring by quarter: 20–12, 14–20, 21–12, 22–12
	Pts: Dimša 19; Rebs: Radzevičius 8 Asts: Birutis 3	Boxscore	Pts: Atić 12; Rebs: Sulejmanović 9 Asts: Atić 4	Arena: Avia Solutions Group Arena; Attendance: 2,246; Referees: Saverio Lanzarini (ITA), Luis Castillo (ESP), Carsten Straube (GER)

1 July 2022 2023 FIBA World Cup qualifiers – 1st round	Czech Republic	93–81	Bosnia and Herzegovina	Pardubice, Czech Republic
20:00	Scoring by quarter: 24–17, 27–19, 19–22, 23–23
	Pts: Balvín 19; Rebs: Balvín 11; Asts: Satoranský 10	Boxscore	Pts: Musa, Roberson 16; Rebs: Halilović 10; Asts: Atić, Roberson 5	Arena: Enteria arena Attendance: 3,621; Referees: Mārtiņš Kozlovskis (LAT), Andris Aunkrogers (LAT), Tanel Suslov (EST)

4 July 2022 2023 FIBA World Cup qualifiers – 1st round	Bosnia and Herzegovina	76–73	Bulgaria	Sarajevo, Bosnia and Herzegovina
20:00	Scoring by quarter: 19–18, 21–18, 18–26, 18–11
	Pts: Halilović 16; Rebs: Halilović 8 Asts: Musa 6	Boxscore	Pts: Bost 24; Rebs: Minchev 8 Asts: Yanev 6	Arena: Mirza Delibašić Hall; Attendance: 4,500; Referees: Georgios Poursanidis (GRE), Dariusz Zapolski (POL), Zafer Yılmaz (TUR)

13 August Friendly	Belgium	68–74	Bosnia and Herzegovina	Tartu, Estonia
17:00	Scoring by quarter: 13–20, 19–16, 17–20, 19–18
	Pts: Obasohan 20; Rebs: Tumba 8 Asts: Lecomte 5	Boxscore	Pts: Nurkić 18; Rebs: Nurkić 9 Asts: Nurkić, Musa 4

14 August Friendly	Estonia	102–89	Bosnia and Herzegovina	Tartu, Estonia
16:00	Scoring by quarter: 16–22, 30–25, 33–12, 23–30
	Pts: Kotsar 21; Rebs: Kotsar 6 Asts: Kriisa 7	Boxscore	Pts: Musa 21; Rebs: Nurkić 9 Asts: Musa 4

24 August 2022 2023 FIBA World Cup qualifiers – 2nd round	Montenegro	88–69	Bosnia and Herzegovina	Podgorica, Montenegro
19:00	Scoring by quarter: 18–15, 23–11, 25–20, 22–23
	Pts: Mihailović 20; Rebs: Dubljević 8 Asts: Drobnjak, Perry 4	Boxscore	Pts: Roberson 20; Rebs: Nurkić 7 Asts: Roberson 7	Arena: Morača Sports Center; Attendance: 5,000; Referees: Antonio Conde (ESP), Oskars Lūcis (LAT), Carsten Straube (GER)

27 August 2022 2023 FIBA World Cup qualifiers – 2nd round	Bosnia and Herzegovina	96–90(2OT)	France	Sarajevo, Bosnia and Herzegovina
20:00	Scoring by quarter: 28–14, 10–32, 21–5, 17–25, Overtime: 7–7, 13–7
	Pts: Nurkić 21; Rebs: Nurkić 9 Asts: Musa 5	Boxscore	Pts: Fournier 24; Rebs: Gobert 13; Asts: Fournier, Tarpey 3	Arena: Mirza Delibašić Hall; Attendance: 6,826; Referees: Manuel Mazzoni (ITA), Wojciech Liszka (POL), Ilias Kounelles (CYP)

1 September 2022 EuroBasket 2022 – Group stage	Bosnia and Herzegovina	95–85	Hungary	Cologne, Germany
14:30	Scoring by quarter: 17–23, 28–23, 28–17, 22–22
	Pts: Musa, Nurkić 19; Rebs: Halilović 9 Asts: Musa 6	Boxscore	Pts: Benke 20; Rebs: Hanga 7 Asts: Benke 6	Arena: Lanxess Arena; Attendance: 14,401; Referees: Marius Ciulin (ROU), Igor Mitrovski (MKD), Ivor Matějek (CZE)

3 September 2022 EuroBasket 2022 – Group stage	Germany	92–82	Bosnia and Herzegovina	Cologne, Germany
14:30	Scoring by quarter: 18–20, 24–27, 28–11, 22–24
	Pts: Schröder, Wagner 18; Rebs: Theis 6 Asts: Schröder 9	Boxscore	Pts: Musa 30; Rebs: Nurkić 7 Asts: three players 4	Arena: Lanxess Arena; Attendance: 18,017; Referees: Wojciech Liszka (POL), Lorenzo Baldini (ITA), Marius Ciulin (ROU)

4 September 2022 EuroBasket 2022 – Group stage	Slovenia	93–97	Bosnia and Herzegovina	Cologne, Germany
17:45	Scoring by quarter: 32–26, 20–23, 21–23, 20–25
	Pts: Čančar 22; Rebs: Dončić 8 Asts: Dončić 8	Boxscore	Pts: Roberson 23; Rebs: Halilović 10; Asts: Musa 5	Arena: Lanxess Arena; Attendance: 15,718; Referees: Lorenzo Baldini (ITA), Mārtiņš Kozlovskis (LAT), Igor Mitrovski (MKD)

6 September 2022 EuroBasket 2022 – Group stage	Bosnia and Herzegovina	68–81	France	Cologne, Germany
14:30	Scoring by quarter: 19–19, 15–25, 16–8, 18–29
	Pts: three players 14; Rebs: Nurkić 10; Asts: Atić 5	Boxscore	Pts: Yabusele 15; Rebs: Gobert 12; Asts: Heurtel 8	Arena: Lanxess Arena; Attendance: 11,957; Referees: Marius Ciulin (ROU), Georgios Poursanidis (GRE), Ilias Kounelles (CYP)

7 September 2022 EuroBasket 2022 – Group stage	Lithuania	87–70	Bosnia and Herzegovina	Cologne, Germany
14:30	Scoring by quarter: 28–28, 28–14, 19–17, 12–11
	Pts: Grigonis 16; Rebs: Valančiūnas 15; Asts: Valančiūnas 5	Boxscore	Pts: Musa 22; Rebs: Kamenjaš 6 Asts: Musa 5	Arena: Lanxess Arena; Attendance: 12,877; Referees: Mārtiņš Kozlovskis (LAT), Lorenzo Baldini (ITA), Martin Horozov (BUL)

11 November 2022 2023 FIBA World Cup qualifiers – 2nd round	Bosnia and Herzegovina	83–78	Hungary	Sarajevo, Bosnia and Herzegovina
20:00	Scoring by quarter: 23–18, 29–20, 10–26, 21–14
	Pts: Kamenjaš 20; Rebs: Kamenjas 14; Asts: Gegić 8	Boxscore	Pts: Filipovity 17; Rebs: Keller, Perl 5 Asts: Benke, Perl 3	Arena: Mirza Delibašić Hall; Attendance: 3,500; Referees: Michał Proc (POL), Oskars Lūcis (LAT), Carsten Straube (GER)

14 November 2022 2023 FIBA World Cup qualifiers – 2nd round	France	92–56	Bosnia and Herzegovina	Pau, France
20:30	Scoring by quarter: 17–13, 23–14, 19–17, 33–12
	Pts: Wembanyama 19; Rebs: Kamagate 6 Asts: Francisco, Sene 4	Boxscore	Pts: Kamenjaš 20; Rebs: Penava 8 Asts: Gegić 5	Arena: Palais des Sports de Pau; Attendance: 6,332; Referees: Georgios Poursanidis (GRE), Lorenzo Baldini (ITA), Andris Aunkrogers (LAT)

=== 2023 ===
23 February 2023 2023 FIBA World Cup qualifiers – 2nd round	Bosnia and Herzegovina	74–66	Montenegro	Tuzla, Bosnia and Herzegovina
20:00	Scoring by quarter: 18–19, 16–18, 20–11, 20–18
	Pts: Roberson 19; Rebs: Kamenjaš 10; Asts: Roberson 6	Boxscore	Pts: Perry 19; Rebs: Radović 11; Asts: Perry 5	Arena: Dvorana Mejdan; Attendance: 5,200; Referees: Manuel Mazzoni (ITA), Mārtiņš Kozlovskis (LAT), Gatis Saliņš (LAT)

26 February 2023 2023 FIBA World Cup qualifiers – 2nd round	Hungary	87–77	Bosnia and Herzegovina	Szombathely, Hungary
19:00	Scoring by quarter: 19–23, 27–14, 17–23, 24–17
	Pts: Benke 19; Rebs: Eilingsfeld, Keller 8 Asts: Somogyi 11	Boxscore	Pts: Roberson 22; Rebs: Kamenjaš, Vrabac 6 Asts: Gegić 6	Arena: Arena Savaria; Attendance: 2,903; Referees: Antonio Conde (ESP), Wojciech Liszka (POL), Yener Yılmaz (TUR)

13 August 2023 2024 Olympic Pre-Qualifying – Group stage	Portugal	75–84	Bosnia and Herzegovina	Gliwice, Poland
16:30	Scoring by quarter: 24–17, 16–20, 14–21, 21–26
	Pts: Lisboa 22; Rebs: Brito 8 Asts: three players 4	Boxscore	Pts: Musa 21; Rebs: Garza 12; Asts: Atić 10	Arena: Gliwice Arena; Attendance: 1,263; Referees: Gvidas Gedvilas (LTU), Martin Horozov (BUL), Mehmet Karabilecen (TUR)

14 August 2023 2024 Olympic Pre-Qualifying – Group stage	Bosnia and Herzegovina	76–85	Poland	Gliwice, Poland
20:30	Scoring by quarter: 19–27, 18–23, 18–20, 21–15
	Pts: Nurkić 17; Rebs: Nurkić 8 Asts: Atić 8	Boxscore	Pts: Ponitka, Sokołowski 22; Rebs: Ponitka 9 Asts: Ponitka 7	Arena: Gliwice Arena; Attendance: 2,859; Referees: Nicolás Maestre (FRA), Kerem Baki (TUR), Gvidas Gedvilas (LTU)

16 August 2023 2024 Olympic Pre-Qualifying – Group stage	Hungary	78–103	Bosnia and Herzegovina	Gliwice, Poland
21:00	Scoring by quarter: 16–36, 12–21, 24–26, 26–20
	Pts: Perl 21; Rebs: Golomán 5 Asts: Perl 5	Boxscore	Pts: Musa 26; Rebs: Nurkić 10; Asts: Musa 7	Arena: Gliwice Arena; Attendance: 764; Referees: Oskars Lucis (LAT), Sergii Zashchuk (UKR), Ariadna Chueca (ESP)

18 August 2023 2024 Olympic Pre-Qualifying – Semi-finals	Bosnia and Herzegovina	86–77	Israel	Gliwice, Poland
20:30	Scoring by quarter: 20–22, 16–11, 23–19, 27–25
	Pts: Garza 24; Rebs: Nurkić 14; Asts: Musa 5	Boxscore	Pts: Sorkin 28; Rebs: Sorkin 9 Asts: Ziv 8	Arena: Gliwice Arena; Attendance: 1,260; Referees: Oskars Lucis (LAT), Zafer Yılmaz (TUR), Sergii Zashchuk (UKR)

20 August 2023 2024 Olympic Pre-Qualifying – Final	Bosnia and Herzegovina	72–76	Poland	Gliwice, Poland
14:15	Scoring by quarter: 23–23, 16–17, 15–14, 18–22
	Pts: Lazić 16; Rebs: Nurkić 12; Asts: Atić 9	Boxscore	Pts: Sokołowski 16; Rebs: Ponitka 8 Asts: Ponitka 5	Arena: Gliwice Arena; Attendance: 5,256; Referees: Oskars Lucis (LAT), Nicolás Maestre (FRA), Zafer Yılmaz (TUR)

=== 2024 ===
23 February 2024 EuroBasket 2025 qualifiers	Cyprus	66–99	Bosnia and Herzegovina	Nicosia, Cyprus
19:00 (UTC+2)	Scoring by quarter: 27–28, 11–23, 18–26, 10–22
	Pts: Willis 22; Rebs: Willis 13; Asts: Stylianou 3	Boxscore	Pts: Musa 26; Rebs: Kamenjaš 10; Asts: Atić, Musa 8	Arena: Eleftheria Indoor Hall; Attendance: 3,000; Referees: Martin Horozov (BUL), Ofer Manheim (ISR), Marek Kúkelčík (SVK)

26 February 2024 EuroBasket 2025 qualifiers	Bosnia and Herzegovina	64–74	France	Tuzla, Bosnia and Herzegovina
19:00 (UTC+1)	Scoring by quarter: 15–16, 17–18, 16–23, 16–17
	Pts: Musa 15; Rebs: Kamenjaš 6 Asts: Musa 3	Boxscore	Pts: Yabusele 16; Rebs: Yabusele 9 Asts: Yabusele 3	Arena: Dvorana Mejdan; Attendance: 4,500; Referees: Luis Castillo (ESP), Kerem Baki (TUR), Dariusz Zapolski (POL)

21 November 2024 EuroBasket 2025 qualifiers	Croatia	89–76	Bosnia and Herzegovina	Zagreb, Croatia
20:00 (UTC+1)	Scoring by quarter: 30–19, 20–29, 23–12, 16–16
	Pts: Božić 25; Rebs: Božić 9 Asts: Smith 4	Boxscore	Pts: Gegić 18; Rebs: Gegić 8 Asts: Atić 6	Arena: Dražen Petrović Basketball Hall; Attendance: 4,000; Referees: Mārtiņš Kozlovskis (LAT), Marius Ciulin (ROU), Gintaras Mačiulis (LTU)

24 November 2024 EuroBasket 2025 qualifiers	Bosnia and Herzegovina	110–90	Croatia	Sarajevo, Bosnia and Herzegovina
18:00 (UTC+1)	Scoring by quarter: 22–21, 28–29, 33–13, 27–27
	Pts: Kamenjaš 21; Rebs: Kamenjaš 10; Asts: Musa 5	Boxscore	Pts: Hezonja 28; Rebs: Hezonja 6 Asts: Božić 6	Arena: Mirza Delibašić Hall; Attendance: 5,500; Referees: Antonio Conde (ESP), Wojciech Liszka (POL), Gvidas Gedvilas (LTU)

=== 2025 ===
21 February 2025 EuroBasket 2025 qualifiers	Bosnia and Herzegovina	108–62	Cyprus	Tuzla, Bosnia and Herzegovina
20:00 (UTC+1)	Scoring by quarter: 28–14, 25–15, 29–21, 26–12
	Pts: Musa 31; Rebs: Vrabac 8 Asts: Atić 8	Boxscore	Pts: Michail 11; Rebs: Jung 6 Asts: Michail 3	Arena: SKPC Mejdan; Attendance: 4,500; Referees: Saverio Lanzarini (ITA), Gintaras Mačiulis (LTU), Cecília Montgomery-Tóth (HUN)

24 February 2025 EuroBasket 2025 qualifiers	France	76–74	Bosnia and Herzegovina	Orléans, France
21:10 (UTC+1)	Scoring by quarter: 18–21, 16–11, 17–25, 25–17
	Pts: Makoundou, Strazel 15; Rebs: Cornelie 6 Asts: Okobo 4	Boxscore	Pts: Castañeda 16; Rebs: Kamenjaš 11; Asts: three players 3	Arena: CO'Met Arena; Attendance: 6,769; Referees: Wojciech Liszka (POL), Lorenzo Baldini (ITA), Ivor Matějek (CZE)

27 July 2025 Friendly	China	90–70	Bosnia and Herzegovina	Nanjing, China
	Scoring by quarter: 25–16, 23–27, 18–3, 24–24
	Pts: Sanning, Shuaipeng 13	Boxscore	Pts: Atić 17	Arena: Nanjing Olympic Sports Center Gymnasium

29 July 2025 Friendly	China	75–72	Bosnia and Herzegovina	Nanjing, China
	Scoring by quarter: 29–15, 13–20, 11–4, 22–33
	Pts: Jinqiu 16	Boxscore	Pts: Pjanić 15	Arena: Nanjing Olympic Sports Center Gymnasium

5 August 2025 Friendly	Serbia	126–89	Bosnia and Herzegovina	Belgrade, Serbia
	Scoring by quarter: 30–23, 34–16, 33–21, 29–29
	Pts: Jokić, Petrušev 20	Boxscore	Pts: Alibegović 22	Arena: Belgrade Arena; Attendance: 0

10 August 2025 Friendly	Bosnia and Herzegovina	90–102	Montenegro	Sarajevo, Bosnia and Herzegovina
18:00 (UTC+2)	Scoring by quarter: 22–21, 24–29, 26–29, 18–23
	Pts: Musa 22	Boxscore	Pts: Vučević 23	Arena: Mirza Delibašić Hall; Attendance: 5,000

16 August 2025 Friendly	Great Britain	73–103	Bosnia and Herzegovina	Ostend, Belgium
17:00 (UTC+2)	Scoring by quarter: 19–35, 27–29, 10–24, 17–15
	Pts: Adamu, Hesson 12; Rebs: Akin 6 Asts: Phillip 4	Boxscore	Pts: Nurkić 24; Rebs: Kamenjaš 9 Asts: Atić 4	Arena: COREtec Dôme

17 August 2025 Friendly	Belgium	60–73	Bosnia and Herzegovina	Ostend, Belgium
16:00 (UTC+2)	Scoring by quarter: 17–17, 15–27, 15–13, 13–16
	Pts: Vanwijn 12; Rebs: Vanwijn 6 Asts: Lecomte 3	Boxscore	Pts: Alibegović 21; Rebs: Nurkić 8 Asts: Arslanagić, Atić 4	Arena: COREtec Dôme

23 August 2025 Friendly	Bosnia and Herzegovina	90–74	Belgium	Sarajevo, Bosnia and Herzegovina
18:00 (UTC+2)	Scoring by quarter: 20–22, 29–12, 22–20, 19–20
	Pts: Nurkić 25	Boxscore	Pts: Vanwijn 16	Arena: Mirza Delibašić Hall; Attendance: 5,000

28 August 2025 EuroBasket 2025 – Group stage	Bosnia and Herzegovina	91–64	Cyprus	Limassol, Cyprus
18:15 (UTC+3)	Scoring by quarter: 23–13, 24–13, 11–23, 33–15
	Pts: Nurkić 18; Rebs: Kamenjaš 8 Asts: Gegić 6	Boxscore	Pts: Simitzis 22; Rebs: Willis 10; Asts: Tigkas 5	Arena: Spyros Kyprianou Athletic Center; Attendance: 2,420; Referees: Mārtiņš Kozlovskis (LAT), Ventsislav Velikov (BUL), Gintaras Mačiulis (LTU)

30 August 2025 EuroBasket 2025 – Group stage	Spain	88–67	Bosnia and Herzegovina	Limassol, Cyprus
21:30 (UTC+3)	Scoring by quarter: 24–16, 20–14, 28–17, 16–20
	Pts: Aldama 19; Rebs: Parra 6 Asts: Brizuela, De Larrea 5	Boxscore	Pts: Kamenjaš 14; Rebs: Kamenjaš 10; Asts: Atić 7	Arena: Spyros Kyprianou Athletic Center; Attendance: 2,739; Referees: Jorge Vázquez (PUR), Gvidas Gedvilas (LTU), Ventsislav Velikov (BUL)

31 August 2025 EuroBasket 2025 – Group stage	Bosnia and Herzegovina	79–96	Italy	Limassol, Cyprus
21:30 (UTC+3)	Scoring by quarter: 21–22, 19–22, 21–28, 18–24
	Pts: Nurkić 21; Rebs: Nurkić 10; Asts: Atić 8	Boxscore	Pts: Fontecchio 39; Rebs: Fontecchio 8 Asts: Pajola 6	Arena: Spyros Kyprianou Athletic Center; Attendance: 3,032; Referees: Matthew Kallio (CAN), Paulo Marques (POR), Péter Praksch (HUN)

2 September 2025 EuroBasket 2025 – Group stage	Greece	77–80	Bosnia and Herzegovina	Limassol, Cyprus
15:00 (UTC+3)	Scoring by quarter: 25–19, 13–25, 14–17, 25–19
	Pts: Sloukas 15; Rebs: Papanikolaou 7 Asts: Sloukas 8	Boxscore	Pts: Nurkić, Roberson 18; Rebs: Nurkić 10; Asts: Gegić 4	Arena: Spyros Kyprianou Athletic Center; Attendance: 7,432; Referees: Mārtiņš Kozlovskis (LAT), Ventsislav Velikov (BUL), Paulo Marques (POR)

4 September 2025 EuroBasket 2025 – Group stage	Bosnia and Herzegovina	84–76	Georgia	Limassol, Cyprus
15:00 (UTC+3)	Scoring by quarter: 20–15, 27–20, 20–27, 17–14
	Pts: Nurkić, Roberson 15; Rebs: Nurkić 12; Asts: Atić 8	Boxscore	Pts: Mamukelashvili 20; Rebs: Mamukelashvili 8 Asts: Baldwin, Shengelia 4	Arena: Spyros Kyprianou Athletic Center; Attendance: 2,539; Referees: Matthew Kallio (CAN), Gvidas Gedvilas (LTU), Ventsislav Velikov (BUL)

7 September 2025 EuroBasket 2025 – Round of 16	Poland	80–72	Bosnia and Herzegovina	Riga, Latvia
12:00 (UTC+3)	Scoring by quarter: 14–23, 26–21, 22–17, 18–11
	Pts: Loyd 28; Rebs: Ponitka 11; Asts: Pluta 3	Boxscore	Pts: Nurkić 20; Rebs: Nurkić 7 Asts: Atić 5	Arena: Xiaomi Arena; Attendance: 1,370; Referees: Antonio Conde (ESP), Gatis Saliņš (LAT), Péter Praksch (HUN)

27 November 2025 2027 FIBA World Cup qualifiers – 1st round	Turkey	93–71	Bosnia and Herzegovina	Istanbul, Turkey
21:00 (UTC+3)	Scoring by quarter: 29–20, 17–25, 21–13, 26–13
	Pts: Biberović 20; Rebs: Saybir 7 Asts: Sipahi 9	Boxscore	Pts: Alibegović 18; Rebs: Marić, Sulejmanović 4 Asts: Arslanagić 8	Arena: Basketball Development Center; Attendance: 9,876; Referees: Wojciech Liszka (POL), Lorenzo Baldini (ITA), Ritvars Helmšteins (LAT)

30 November 2025 2027 FIBA World Cup qualifiers – 1st round	Bosnia and Herzegovina	72–74	Serbia	Sarajevo, Bosnia and Herzegovina
20:00 (UTC+1)	Scoring by quarter: 15–13, 24–22, 19–16, 14–23
	Pts: Castañeda 19; Rebs: Alibegović 7 Asts: Atić 5	Boxscore	Pts: Tanasković 24; Rebs: Dobrić, Tanasković 8 Asts: Dobrić 5	Arena: Mirza Delibašić Hall; Attendance: 4,500; Referees: Antonio Conde (ESP), Gatis Saliņš (LAT), Paulo Marques (POR)

=== 2026 ===
27 February 2026 2027 FIBA World Cup qualifiers – 1st round	Bosnia and Herzegovina	84–60	Switzerland	Tuzla, Bosnia and Herzegovina
20:00 (UTC+1)	Scoring by quarter: 20–12, 21–15, 23–16, 20–17
	Pts: Vrabac 15; Rebs: Sulejmanović 9 Asts: Atić 9	Boxscore	Pts: Schumacher 19; Rebs: Mambo 10; Asts: Schumacher 3	Arena: Mejdan Hall; Attendance: 5,000; Referees: Georgios Poursanidis (GRE), Martin Horozov (BUL), Ioannis Tsibouris (GRE)

2 March 2026 2027 FIBA World Cup qualifiers – 1st round	Switzerland	60–91	Bosnia and Herzegovina	Kriens, Switzerland
19:00 (UTC+1)	Scoring by quarter: 14–21, 20–29, 18–24, 8–17
	Pts: Mbala 9 Rebs: Granvorka 10; Asts: Schumacher 9	Boxscore	Pts: Musa 25; Rebs: Kamenjaš 8 Asts: Talić 6	Arena: Pilatus Arena; Attendance: 3,820; Referees: Ariadna Chueca (ESP), Gintaras Mačiulis (LTU), Ilias Kounellis (CYP)

2 July 2026 2027 FIBA World Cup qualifiers – 1st round	Bosnia and Herzegovina	75–82	Turkey	Zenica, Bosnia and Herzegovina
20:00 (UTC+2)	Scoring by quarter: 18–17, 21–17, 18–25, 18–23
	Pts: Garza 27; Rebs: Garza 8 Asts: Atić 6	Boxscore	Pts: Hazer 16; Rebs: Osman 11; Asts: Sipahi 7	Arena: Arena Zenica; Attendance: 3,500; Referees: Antonio Conde (ESP), Dariusz Zapolski (POL), Ritvars Helmšteins (LAT)

6 July 2026 2027 FIBA World Cup qualifiers – 1st round	Serbia	94–81	Bosnia and Herzegovina	Belgrade, Serbia
20:00 (UTC+2)	Scoring by quarter: 27–15, 27–20, 21–24, 19–22
	Pts: Jović 32; Rebs: Jokić 10; Asts: Jokić 11	Boxscore	Pts: Garza 16; Rebs: Alibegović, Garza 7 Asts: Talić 8	Arena: Aleksandar Nikolić Hall; Attendance: 7,249; Referees: Wojciech Liszka (POL), Gatis Saliņš (LAT), Lorenzo Baldini (ITA)

20 August 2026 Friendly	Bosnia and Herzegovina	69–60	Poland	Hrasnica, Bosnia and Herzegovina
19:00 (UTC+2)	Scoring by quarter: 21–14, 19–12, 11–18, 18–16
		Boxscore		Arena: Hrasnica Sport Hall

28 August 2026 2027 FIBA World Cup qualifiers – 2nd round	Bosnia and Herzegovina	78–76	Italy	Tuzla, Bosnia and Herzegovina
20:00 (UTC+2)	Scoring by quarter: 18–17, 16–10, 24–27, 20–22
	Pts: Nurkić 25; Rebs: Nurkić 13; Asts: Gegić 4	Boxscore	Pts: Fontecchio, Mannion 14; Rebs: Fontecchio, Melli 6 Asts: Mannion 6	Arena: SKPC Mejdan; Attendance: 4,850; Referees: Mārtiņš Kozlovskis (LAT), Michał Proć (POL), Edgard Ceccarelli (FRA)

31 August 2026 2027 FIBA World Cup qualifiers – 2nd round	Lithuania	78–73	Bosnia and Herzegovina	Vilnius, Lithuania
18:30 (UTC+3)	Scoring by quarter: 20–23, 22–23, 19–12, 17–15
	Pts: Tubelis 23; Rebs: Blaževič 6 Asts: Marčiulionis, Žemaitis 5	Boxscore	Pts: Nurkić 20; Rebs: Kamenjaš 9 Asts: Atić 6	Arena: Arena Vilnius; Attendance: 4,989; Referees: Yohan Rosso (FRA), Mihkel Männiste (EST), Geert Jacobs (BEL)

26 November 2026 2027 FIBA World Cup qualifiers – 2nd round	Iceland	vs.	Bosnia and Herzegovina	Iceland
--:-- (UTC+0)
		Boxscore

29 November 2026 2027 FIBA World Cup qualifiers – 2nd round	Bosnia and Herzegovina	vs.	Lithuania	Bosnia and Herzegovina
--:-- (UTC+1)
		Boxscore

=== 2027 ===
26 February 2027 2027 FIBA World Cup qualifiers – 2nd round	Italy	vs.	Bosnia and Herzegovina	Italy
--:-- (UTC+1)
		Boxscore

1 March 2027 2027 FIBA World Cup qualifiers – 2nd round	Bosnia and Herzegovina	vs.	Iceland	Bosnia and Herzegovina
--:-- (UTC+2)
		Boxscore
