= EuroBasket 2025 knockout stage =

International basketball event

The knockout stage of the EuroBasket 2025 took place between 6 and 14 September 2025. All games were played at the Xiaomi Arena in Riga, Latvia.

== Qualified teams ==
Group	Winners	Runners-up	Third place	Fourth place
A	Turkey	Serbia	Latvia	Portugal
B	Germany	Lithuania	Finland	Sweden
C	Greece	Italy	Bosnia and Herzegovina	Georgia
D	France	Poland	Slovenia	Israel

== Bracket ==
All times are local (UTC+3).

Round of 16
6 September
B2 Lithuania	88
A3 Latvia	79
7 September
C1 Greece	84
D4 Israel	79
6 September
A1 Turkey	85
B4 Sweden	79
7 September
D2 Poland	80
C3 Bosnia and Herzegovina	72
6 September
B1 Germany	85
A4 Portugal	58
7 September
C2 Italy	77
D3 Slovenia	84
6 September
A2 Serbia	86
B3 Finland	92
7 September
D1 France	70
C4 Georgia	80

Quarterfinals
9 September
B2 Lithuania	76
C1 Greece	87
9 September
A1 Turkey	91
D2 Poland	77
10 September
B1 Germany	99
D3 Slovenia	91
10 September
B3 Finland	93
C4 Georgia	79

Semifinals
12 September
C1 Greece	68
A1 Turkey	94
12 September
B1 Germany	98
B3 Finland	86

Final
14 September
A1 Turkey	83
B1 Germany	88
Third place
14 September
C1 Greece	92
B3 Finland	89

== Round of 16 ==
=== Turkey vs Sweden ===
6 September 2025
12:00

Boxscore

Turkey	85–79	Sweden
Scoring by quarter: 20–23, 17–19, 26–13, 22–24
Pts: Şengün 24; Rebs: Şengün 16; Asts: Şengün 6		Pts: Hakanson 16; Rebs: Birgander 13; Asts: Pantzar 6

Xiaomi Arena, Riga
Attendance: 2,193
Referees: Yohan Rosso (FRA), Ariadna Chueca (ESP), Boris Krejić (SLO)

=== Germany vs Portugal ===
6 September 2025
15:15

Boxscore

Germany	85–58	Portugal
Scoring by quarter: 17–12, 14–20, 21–19, 33–7
Pts: Schröder, Wagner 16; Rebs: Bonga, Wagner 7 Asts: Wagner 5		Pts: Queta 18; Rebs: Queta 11; Asts: Gameiro, Lisboa 4

Xiaomi Arena, Riga
Attendance: 2,316
Referees: Antonio Conde (ESP), Martin Horozov (BUL), Martin Vulić (CRO)

=== Lithuania vs Latvia ===
6 September 2025
18:30

Boxscore

Lithuania	88–79	Latvia
Scoring by quarter: 28–18, 19–19, 19–17, 22–25
Pts: Velička 21; Rebs: Tubelis 12; Asts: Velička 11		Pts: Porziņģis 34; Rebs: Porziņģis 19; Asts: Lomažs 7

Xiaomi Arena, Riga
Attendance: 11,000
Referees: Matthew Kallio (CAN), Ademir Zurapović (BIH), Wojciech Liszka (POL)

=== Serbia vs Finland ===
6 September 2025
21:45

Boxscore

Serbia	86–92	Finland
Scoring by quarter: 24–28, 24–16, 18–24, 20–24
Pts: Jokić 33; Rebs: Jokić 8 Asts: three players 4		Pts: Markkanen 29; Rebs: Little, Markkanen 8 Asts: Little 6

Xiaomi Arena, Riga
Attendance: 4,006
Referees: Jorge Vázquez (PUR), Takaki Kato (JPN), Luis Castillo (ESP)

=== Poland vs Bosnia and Herzegovina ===
7 September 2025
12:00

Boxscore

Poland	80–72	Bosnia and Herzegovina
Scoring by quarter: 14–23, 26–21, 22–17, 18–11
Pts: Loyd 28; Rebs: Ponitka 11; Asts: Pluta 3		Pts: Nurkić 20; Rebs: Nurkić 7 Asts: Atić 5

Xiaomi Arena, Riga
Attendance: 1,370
Referees: Antonio Conde (ESP), Gatis Saliņš (LAT), Péter Praksch (HUN)

=== France vs Georgia ===
7 September 2025
15:15

Boxscore

France	70–80	Georgia
Scoring by quarter: 20–24, 17–14, 17–20, 16–22
Pts: Francisco 14; Rebs: Jaiteh 7 Asts: Jaiteh 4		Pts: Baldwin, Shengelia 24; Rebs: Mamukelashvili 11; Asts: Bitadze 4

Xiaomi Arena, Riga
Attendance: 1,652
Referees: Jorge Vázquez (PUR), Kerem Baki (TUR), Ventsislav Velikov (BUL)

=== Italy vs Slovenia ===
7 September 2025
18:30

Boxscore

Italy	77–84	Slovenia
Scoring by quarter: 11–29, 29–21, 16–22, 21–12
Pts: Fontecchio 22; Rebs: Melli, Niang 6 Asts: Spissu 8		Pts: Dončić 42; Rebs: Dončić 10; Asts: four players 2

Xiaomi Arena, Riga
Attendance: 3,016
Referees: Matthew Kallio (CAN), Julio Anaya (PAN), Mārtiņš Kozlovskis (LAT)

=== Greece vs Israel ===
7 September 2025
21:45

Boxscore

Greece	84–79	Israel
Scoring by quarter: 28–22, 22–19, 17–18, 17–20
Pts: G. Antetokounmpo 37; Rebs: G. Antetokounmpo 10; Asts: Papanikolaou 4		Pts: Avdija 23; Rebs: Sorkin 6 Asts: Madar, Timor 5

Xiaomi Arena, Riga
Attendance: 2,157
Referees: Yohan Rosso (FRA), Takaki Kato (JPN), Luis Castillo (ESP)

== Quarterfinals ==
=== Turkey vs Poland ===
9 September 2025
17:00

Boxscore

Turkey	91–77	Poland
Scoring by quarter: 19–19, 27–13, 19–18, 26–27
Pts: Şengün 19; Rebs: Şengün 12; Asts: Şengün 10		Pts: Loyd, Ponitka 19; Rebs: Balcerowski, Ponitka 6 Asts: Ponitka 6

Xiaomi Arena, Riga
Attendance: 3,463
Referees: Ademir Zurapović (BIH), Takaki Kato (JPN), Martin Horozov (BUL)

=== Lithuania vs Greece ===
9 September 2025
21:00

Boxscore

Lithuania	76–87	Greece
Scoring by quarter: 19–24, 19–20, 14–20, 24–23
Pts: Valančiūnas 24; Rebs: Valančiūnas 15; Asts: Velička 7		Pts: G. Antetokounmpo 29; Rebs: Papanikolaou 7 Asts: Sloukas 4

Xiaomi Arena, Riga
Attendance: 10,487
Referees: Matthew Kallio (CAN), Antonio Conde (ESP), Martin Vulić (CRO)

=== Finland vs Georgia ===
10 September 2025
17:00

Boxscore

Finland	93–79	Georgia
Scoring by quarter: 28–15, 29–25, 14–22, 22–17
Pts: Jantunen 19; Rebs: Salin 7 Asts: Little 9		Pts: Mamukelashvili 22; Rebs: Bitadze 6 Asts: Shengelia 5

Xiaomi Arena, Riga
Attendance: 6,025
Referees: Yohan Rosso (FRA), Julio Anaya (PAN), Gatis Saliņš (LAT)

=== Germany vs Slovenia ===
10 September 2025
21:00

Boxscore

Germany	99–91	Slovenia
Scoring by quarter: 21–32, 24–19, 25–23, 29–17
Pts: Wagner 23; Rebs: Theis 9 Asts: Schröder 7		Pts: Dončić 39; Rebs: Dončić 10; Asts: Dončić 7

Xiaomi Arena, Riga
Attendance: 9,038
Referees: Wojciech Liszka (POL), Luis Castillo (ESP), Mārtiņš Kozlovskis (LAT)

== Semifinals ==
=== Germany vs Finland ===
12 September 2025
17:00

Boxscore

Germany	98–86	Finland
Scoring by quarter: 30–26, 31–21, 20–26, 17–13
Pts: Schröder 26; Rebs: Theis 11; Asts: Schröder 12		Pts: Nkamhoua 21; Rebs: Markkanen, Nkamhoua 8 Asts: Little 5

Xiaomi Arena, Riga
Attendance: 10,047
Referees: Yohan Rosso (FRA), Antonio Conde (ESP), Boris Krejić (SLO)

=== Greece vs Turkey ===
12 September 2025
21:00

Boxscore

Greece	68–94	Turkey
Scoring by quarter: 16–26, 15–23, 20–23, 17–22
Pts: Sloukas 15; Rebs: G. Antetokounmpo 12; Asts: G. Antetokounmpo 5		Pts: Osmani 28; Rebs: Şengün 12; Asts: Hazer, Şengün 6

Xiaomi Arena, Riga
Attendance: 10,500
Referees: Matthew Kallio (CAN), Ademir Zurapović (BIH), Jorge Vázquez (PUR)

== Third place game ==
14 September 2025
17:00

Boxscore

Greece	92–89	Finland
Scoring by quarter: 24–15, 24–19, 21–22, 23–33
Pts: G. Antetokounmpo 30; Rebs: G. Antetokounmpo 17; Asts: G. Antetokounmpo, Papanikolaou 6		Pts: Markkanen 19; Rebs: Markkanen 10; Asts: Jantunen 7

Xiaomi Arena, Riga
Attendance: 11,000
Referees: Jorge Vázquez (PUR), Antonio Conde (ESP), Julio Anaya (PAN)

== Final ==
14 September 2025
21:00

Boxscore

Turkey	83–88	Germany
Scoring by quarter: 22–24, 24–16, 21–26, 16–22
Pts: Şengün 28; Rebs: Larkin 6 Asts: Larkin 9		Pts: Bonga 20; Rebs: Wagner 8 Asts: Schröder 12

Xiaomi Arena, Riga
Attendance: 11,000
Referees: Matthew Kallio (CAN), Ademir Zurapović (BIH), Yohan Rosso (FRA)
