= EuroBasket 2025 Group C =

International basketball event

Group C of EuroBasket 2025 consisted of Bosnia and Herzegovina, Cyprus, Georgia, Greece, Italy, and Spain. The games were played from 28 August to 4 September 2025 at the Spyros Kyprianou Athletic Center in Limassol, Cyprus. The top four teams advanced to the knockout stage.

== Teams ==
| Team | Qualification method | Date of qualification | App | First | Last | Streak | Best placement | World Ranking | |
| Team | Qualification method | Date of qualification | App | First | Last | Streak | Best placement | February 2025 (Note: The rankings of February 2025 were used for the final draw.) | August 2025 |
|---|---|---|---|---|---|---|---|---|---|
| Cyprus | Host nation | 29 March 2022 | 1st | — | — | 1 | Debut | 85 | 84 |
| Italy | Group B top three | 25 November 2024 | 39th | 1935 | 2022 | 6 | Champions (1983, 1999) | 14 | 14 |
| Georgia | Group G top two | 21 February 2025 | 6th | 2011 | 2022 | 6 | 11th place (2011) | 24 | 24 |
| Spain | Group C top two | 20 February 2025 | 33rd | 1935 | 2022 | 32 | Champions (2009, 2011, 2015, 2022) | 5 | 5 |
| Greece | Group F top three | 21 February 2025 | 29th | 1949 | 2022 | 18 | Champions (1987, 2005) | 13 | 13 |
| Bosnia and Herzegovina | Group E top two | 21 February 2025 | 11th | 1993 | 2022 | 2 | Eighth place (1993) | 41 | 41 |

== Standings ==
| Pos | Team | Pld | W | L | PF | PA | PD | Pts | Qualification |
|---|---|---|---|---|---|---|---|---|---|
| 1 | Greece | 5 | 4 | 1 | 432 | 354 | +78 | 9 (Note: Greece 75–66 Italy) | Knockout stage |
| 2 | Italy | 5 | 4 | 1 | 396 | 333 | +63 | 9 | Knockout stage |
| 3 | Bosnia and Herzegovina | 5 | 3 | 2 | 401 | 401 | 0 | 8 | Knockout stage |
| 4 | Georgia | 5 | 2 | 3 | 367 | 386 | −19 | 7 (Note: Georgia 83–69 Spain) | Knockout stage |
| 5 | Spain | 5 | 2 | 3 | 397 | 354 | +43 | 7 | |
| 6 | Cyprus (H) | 5 | 0 | 5 | 295 | 460 | −165 | 5 | |

Source: FIBA
Rules for classification: 1) Points; 2) Head-to-head results; 3) Points difference; 4) Points scored.
(H) Hosts

== Matches ==
All times are local (UTC+3).

=== Georgia vs Spain ===
28 August 2025
15:00

Boxscore

| Georgia | 83–69 | Spain |
Scoring by quarter: 20–17, 17–18, 20–14, 26–20
| Pts: Mamukelashvili 19; Rebs: Burjanadze, Mamukelashvili 7 Asts: Mamukelashvili 6 | | Pts: J. Hernangómez 13; Rebs: J. Hernangómez 8 Asts: De Larrea 5 |

Spyros Kyprianou Athletic Center, Limassol
Attendance: 1,520
Referees: Matthew Kallio (CAN), Paulo Marques (POR), Petar Pešić (SRB)

=== Bosnia and Herzegovina vs Cyprus ===
28 August 2025
18:15

Boxscore

| Bosnia and Herzegovina | 91–64 | Cyprus |
Scoring by quarter: 23–13, 24–13, 11–23, 33–15
| Pts: Nurkić 18; Rebs: Kamenjaš 8 Asts: Gegić 6 | | Pts: Simitzis 22; Rebs: Willis 10; Asts: Tigkas 5 |

Spyros Kyprianou Athletic Center, Limassol
Attendance: 2,420
Referees: Mārtiņš Kozlovskis (LAT), Ventsislav Valikov (BUL), Gintaras Mačiulis (LTU)

=== Greece vs Italy ===
28 August 2025
21:30

Boxscore

| Greece | 75–66 | Italy |
Scoring by quarter: 22–12, 14–20, 20–13, 19–21
| Pts: G. Antetokoumpo 31; Rebs: G. Antetokoumpo 7 Asts: Sloukas 4 | | Pts: Melli 15; Rebs: Melli 7 Asts: Melli 5 |

Spyros Kyprianou Athletic Center, Limassol
Attendance: 7,000
Referees: Jorge Vázquez (PUR), Gvidas Gedvilas (LTU), Péter Praksch (HUN)

=== Italy vs Georgia ===
30 August 2025
15:00

Boxscore

| Italy | 78–62 | Georgia |
Scoring by quarter: 18–10, 14–22, 21–15, 25–15
| Pts: Niang 15; Rebs: Melli 8 Asts: Pajola, Spissu 5 | | Pts: Bitadze 22; Rebs: Mamukelashvili, Shermadini 5 Asts: Shengelia 5 |

Spyros Kyprianou Athletic Center, Limassol
Attendance: 2,089
Referees: Matthew Kallio (CAN), Mārtiņš Kozlovskis (LAT), Petar Pešić (SRB)

=== Cyprus vs Greece ===
30 August 2025
18:15

Boxscore

| Cyprus | 69–96 | Greece |
Scoring by quarter: 13–22, 18–21, 16–26, 22–27
| Pts: Simitzis 16; Rebs: Willis 8 Asts: Tigkas 4 | | Pts: Dorsey, Mitoglou 18; Rebs: Samodurov 8 Asts: Kalaitzakis, Katsivelis 5 |

Spyros Kyprianou Athletic Center, Limassol
Attendance: 7,349
Referees: Paulo Marques (POR), Siniša Prpa (SRB), Carsten Straube (GER)

=== Spain vs Bosnia and Herzegovina ===
30 August 2025
21:30

Boxscore

| Spain | 88–67 | Bosnia and Herzegovina |
Scoring by quarter: 24–16, 20–14, 28–17, 16–20
| Pts: Aldama 19; Rebs: Parra 6 Asts: Brizuela, De Larrea 5 | | Pts: Kamenjaš 14; Rebs: Kamenjaš 10; Asts: Atić 7 |

Spyros Kyprianou Athletic Center, Limassol
Attendance: 2,739
Referees: Jorge Vázquez (PUR), Gvidas Gedvilas (LTU), Ventsislav Velikov (BUL)

=== Georgia vs Greece ===
31 August 2025
15:00

Boxscore

| Georgia | 53–94 | Greece |
Scoring by quarter: 13–22, 16–24, 12–23, 12–25
| Pts: Mamukelashvili 14; Rebs: Shermadini 7 Asts: Baldwin 5 | | Pts: G. Antetokounmpo 27; Rebs: G. Antetokounmpo 8 Asts: Sloukas 6 |

Spyros Kyprianou Athletic Center, Limassol
Attendance: 7,290
Referees: Jorge Vázquez (PUR), Mārtiņš Kozlovskis (LAT), Ventsislav Velikov (BUL)

=== Spain vs Cyprus ===
31 August 2025
18:15

Boxscore

| Spain | 91–47 | Cyprus |
Scoring by quarter: 19–9, 22–8, 29–12, 21–18
| Pts: W. Hernangómez 19; Rebs: W. Hernangómez 8 Asts: Saint-Supéry, De Larrea 5 | | Pts: Willis 16; Rebs: Willis 6 Asts: five players 2 |

Spyros Kyprianou Athletic Center, Limassol
Attendance: 5,068
Referees: Gvidas Gedvilas (LTU), Petar Pešić (SRB), Carsten Straube (GER)

=== Bosnia and Herzegovina vs Italy ===
31 August 2025
21:30

Boxscore

| Bosnia and Herzegovina | 79–96 | Italy |
Scoring by quarter: 21–22, 19–22, 21–28, 18–24
| Pts: Nurkić 21; Rebs: Nurkić 10; Asts: Atić 8 | | Pts: Fontecchio 39; Rebs: Fontecchio 8 Asts: Pajola 6 |

Spyros Kyprianou Athletic Center, Limassol
Attendance: 3,032
Referees: Matthew Kallio (CAN), Paulo Marques (POR), Péter Praksch (HUN)

=== Greece vs Bosnia and Herzegovina ===
2 September 2025
15:00

Boxscore

| Greece | 77–80 | Bosnia and Herzegovina |
Scoring by quarter: 25–19, 13–25, 14–17, 25–19
| Pts: Sloukas 15; Rebs: Papanikolaou 7 Asts: Sloukas 8 | | Pts: Nurkić, Roberson 18; Rebs: Nurkić 10; Asts: Gegić 4 |

Spyros Kyprianou Athletic Center, Limassol
Attendance: 7,432
Referees: Mārtiņš Kozlovskis (LAT), Ventsislav Velikov (BUL), Paulo Marques (POR)

=== Cyprus vs Georgia ===
2 September 2025
18:15

Boxscore

| Cyprus | 61–93 | Georgia |
Scoring by quarter: 13–15, 13–27, 15–26, 20–25
| Pts: Willis 19; Rebs: Willis 7 Asts: Stylianou 5 | | Pts: Shengelia 27; Rebs: Bitadze 13; Asts: three players 6 |

Spyros Kyprianou Athletic Center, Limassol
Attendance: 3,142
Referees: Gvidas Gedvilas (LTU), Siniša Prpa (SRB), Gintaras Mačiulis (LTU)

=== Italy vs Spain ===
2 September 2025
21:30

Boxscore

| Italy | 67–63 | Spain |
Scoring by quarter: 10–18, 20–18, 19–11, 18–16
| Pts: Diouf 14; Rebs: Niang 10; Asts: Spissu 6 | | Pts: Aldama 19; Rebs: Aldama 10; Asts: Aldama 4 |

Spyros Kyprianou Athletic Center, Limassol
Attendance: 3,839
Referees: Matthew Kallio (CAN), Jorge Vázquez (PUR), Péter Praksch (HUN)

=== Bosnia and Herzegovina vs Georgia ===
4 September 2025
15:00

Boxscore

| Bosnia and Herzegovina | 84–76 | Georgia |
Scoring by quarter: 20–15, 27–20, 20–27, 17–14
| Pts: Nurkić, Roberson 15; Rebs: Nurkić 12; Asts: Atić 8 | | Pts: Mamukelashvili 20; Rebs: Mamukelashvili 8 Asts: Baldwin, Shengelia 4 |

Spyros Kyprianou Athletic Center, Limassol
Attendance: 2,539
Referees: Matthew Kallio (CAN), Gvidas Gedvilas (LTU), Ventsislav Velikov (BUL)

=== Italy vs Cyprus ===
4 September 2025
18:15

Boxscore

| Italy | 89–54 | Cyprus |
Scoring by quarter: 24–6, 16–13, 27–24, 22–11
| Pts: Fontecchio, Spagnolo 13; Rebs: Diouf 10; Asts: Spagnolo 5 | | Pts: Tigkas 15; Rebs: Tigkas 6 Asts: Tigkas 4 |

Spyros Kyprianou Athletic Center, Limassol
Attendance: 3,924
Referees: Paulo Marques (POR), Petar Pešić (SRB), Siniša Prpa (SRB)

=== Spain vs Greece ===
4 September 2025
21:30

Boxscore

| Spain | 86–90 | Greece |
Scoring by quarter: 20–31, 15–19, 28–18, 23–22
| Pts: Pradilla 14; Rebs: Aldama 8 Asts: De Larrea 6 | | Pts: G. Antetokounmpo 25; Rebs: G. Antetokounmpo 14; Asts: G. Antetokounmpo 9 |

Spyros Kyprianou Athletic Center, Limassol
Attendance: 7,709
Referees: Jorge Vázquez (PUR), Mārtiņš Kozlovskis (LAT), Péter Praksch (HUN)
