= EuroBasket 2025 Group D =

International basketball event

Group D of EuroBasket 2025 consisted of Belgium, France, Iceland, Israel, Poland, and Slovenia. The games were played from 28 August to 4 September 2025 at the Spodek in Katowice, Poland. The top four teams advanced to the knockout stage.

== Teams ==
Team	Qualification method	Date of qualification	App	First	Last	Streak	Best placement	World Ranking	
Team	Qualification method	Date of qualification	App	First	Last	Streak	Best placement	February 2025 (Note: The rankings of February 2025 were used for the final draw.)	August 2025
Iceland	Group B top three	23 February 2025	3rd	2015	2017	1	24th place (2015, 2017)	50	40
France	Group E top two	21 February 2025	40th	1935	2022	23	Champions (2013)	4	4
Slovenia	Group A top three	25 November 2024	15th	1993	2022	15	Champions (2017)	11	11
Poland	Host nation	17 September 2022	30th	1937	2022	8	Runners-up (1963)	17	17
Belgium	Group C top three	20 February 2025	19th	1935	2022	6	Fourth place (1947)	40	40
Israel	Group A top three	25 November 2024	31st	1953	2022	15	Runners-up (1979)	39	39

== Standings ==
Pos	Team	Pld	W	L	PF	PA	PD	Pts	Qualification
1	France	5	4	1	461	391	+70	9	Knockout stage
2	Poland (H)	5	3	2	400	387	+13	8 (Note: Poland 4 Pts; Slovenia 3 pts; Israel 2 pts)	Knockout stage
3	Slovenia	5	3	2	469	452	+17	8	Knockout stage
4	Israel	5	3	2	417	401	+16	8	Knockout stage
5	Belgium	5	2	3	363	403	−40	7	
6	Iceland	5	0	5	363	439	−76	5	

Source: FIBA
Rules for classification: 1) Points; 2) Head-to-head results; 3) Points difference; 4) Points scored.
(H) Hosts

== Matches ==
All times are local (UTC+2).

=== Israel vs Iceland ===
28 August 2025
14:00

Boxscore

Israel	83–71	Iceland
Scoring by quarter: 23-19, 13-13, 24-20, 23-19
Pts: Sorkin 31; Rebs: Avdija 9 Asts: Ginat, Madar 6		Pts: Friðriksson 17; Rebs: Hlinason 14; Asts: three players 3

Spodek, Katowice
Attendance: 3,045
Referees: Yener Yılmaz (TUR), Martin Vulić (CRO), Ivor Matějek (CZE)

=== Belgium vs France ===
28 August 2025
17:00

Boxscore

Belgium	64–92	France
Scoring by quarter: 10–18, 17–25, 22–27, 15–22
Pts: Vanwijn 13; Rebs: Bako 7 Asts: Van Den Eynde 6		Pts: Coulibaly, Okobo 12; Rebs: Coulibaly 7 Asts: Francisco 6

Spodek, Katowice
Attendance: 2,472
Referees: Takaki Kato (JPN), Zafer Yılmaz (TUR), Mihkel Männiste (EST)

=== Slovenia vs Poland ===
28 August 2025
20:30

Boxscore

Slovenia	95–105	Poland
Scoring by quarter: 25–29, 21–18, 23–33, 26–25
Pts: Dončić 34; Rebs: Omić 10; Asts: Dončić 9		Pts: Loyd 32; Rebs: Ponitka 7 Asts: Pluta, Sokołowski 3

Spodek, Katowice
Attendance: 9,337
Referees: Gatis Saliņš (LAT), Kerem Baki (TUR), Andris Aunkrogers (LAT)

=== Iceland vs Belgium ===
30 August 2025
14:00

Boxscore

Iceland	64–71	Belgium
Scoring by quarter: 21–17, 15–15, 16–14, 12–25
Pts: Hlinason 20; Rebs: Hlinason 10; Asts: Hermannsson 8		Pts: Lecomte 16; Rebs: Vanwijn 10; Asts: Lecomte 6

Spodek, Katowice
Attendance: 4,957
Referees: Zafer Yılmaz (TUR), Kerem Baki (TUR), Juozas Barkauskas (LTU)

=== France vs Slovenia ===
30 August 2025
17:00

Boxscore

France	103–95	Slovenia
Scoring by quarter: 28–30, 19–24, 21–16, 35–25
Pts: Francisco 32; Rebs: Francisco, Yabusele 7 Asts: Francisco, Okobo 5		Pts: Dončić 39; Rebs: Dončić, Murić 8 Asts: Dončić 9

Spodek, Katowice
Attendance: 8,574
Referees: Takaki Kato (JPN), Gatis Saliņš (LAT), Yener Yılmaz (TUR)

=== Poland vs Israel ===
30 August 2025
20:30

Boxscore

Poland	66–64	Israel
Scoring by quarter: 19–14, 18–12, 11–25, 18–13
Pts: Loyd 27; Rebs: Ponitka 11; Asts: Pluta 7		Pts: Avdija 23; Rebs: Avdija 9 Asts: Madar 9

Spodek, Katowice
Attendance: 8,998
Referees: Andris Aunkrogers (LAT), Mihkel Männiste (EST), Martin Vulić (CRO)

=== Slovenia vs Belgium ===
31 August 2025
14:00

Boxscore

Slovenia	86–69	Belgium
Scoring by quarter: 16–10, 27–21, 21–17, 22–21
Pts: Dončić 26; Rebs: Dončić 10; Asts: Dončić 11		Pts: Van Vliet 15; Rebs: Lecomte, Van Vliet 5 Asts: Lecomte 5

Spodek, Katowice
Attendance: 6,659
Referees: Takaki Kato (JPN), Kerem Baki (TUR), Mihkel Männiste (EST)

=== Israel vs France ===
31 August 2025
17:00

Boxscore

Israel	82–69	France
Scoring by quarter: 17–22, 19–14, 19–20, 27–13
Pts: Avdija 23; Rebs: Avdija, Sorkin 8 Asts: Madar, Timor 3		Pts: Risacher 14; Rebs: Jaiteh, Luwawu-Cabarrot 5 Asts: Okobo 5

Spodek, Katowice
Attendance: 7,158
Referees: Gatis Saliņš (LAT), Martin Vulić (CRO), Ivor Matějek (CZE)

=== Poland vs Iceland ===
31 August 2025
20:30

Boxscore

Poland	84–75	Iceland
Scoring by quarter: 19–16, 22–16, 20–19, 23–24
Pts: Loyd 26; Rebs: Ponitka 8 Asts: Ponitka 8		Pts: Hlinason 21; Rebs: Hlinason 10; Asts: Hermannsson 6

Spodek, Katowice
Attendance: 8,745
Referees: Yener Yılmaz (TUR), Viola Gyorgyi (ROU), Andris Aunkrogers (LAT)

=== Belgium vs Israel ===
2 September 2025
14:00

Boxscore

Belgium	89–92	Israel
Scoring by quarter: 15–23, 21–28, 18–20, 35–21
Pts: Lecomte 15; Rebs: Vanwijn 11; Asts: Vanwijn 9		Pts: Avdija 22; Rebs: Ginat 13; Asts: Madar 7

Spodek, Katowice
Attendance: 2,248
Referees: Gatis Saliņš (LAT), Zafer Yılmaz (TUR), Mihkel Männiste (EST)

=== Iceland vs Slovenia ===
2 September 2025
17:00

Boxscore

Iceland	79–87	Slovenia
Scoring by quarter: 20–21, 15–15, 11–24, 33–27
Pts: Hermannsson 22; Rebs: Hlinason 14; Asts: Hermannsson 6		Pts: Dončić 26; Rebs: Omić 13; Asts: Nikolić 5

Spodek, Katowice
Attendance: 3,752
Referees: Andris Aunkrogers (LAT), Martin Vulić (CRO), Juozas Barkauskas (LTU)

=== France vs Poland ===
2 September 2025
20:30

Boxscore

France	83–76	Poland
Scoring by quarter: 27–24, 14–20, 19–11, 23–21
Pts: Yabusele 36; Rebs: Yabusele 6 Asts: Okobo 10		Pts: Loyd 18; Rebs: Sokołowski 6 Asts: Łączyński 8

Spodek, Katowice
Attendance: 9,262
Referees: Takaki Kato (JPN), Kerem Baki (TUR), Yener Yılmaz (TUR)

=== France vs Iceland ===
4 September 2025
14:00

Boxscore

France	114–74	Iceland
Scoring by quarter: 36–9, 30–25, 24–12, 24–28
Pts: Risacher 15; Rebs: Risacher 7 Asts: three players 5		Pts: Hermannsson 15; Rebs: Gunnarsson 6 Asts: three players 3

Spodek, Katowice
Attendance: 4,088
Referees: Yener Yılmaz (TUR), Martin Vulić (CRO), Ivor Matějek (CZE)

=== Israel vs Slovenia ===
4 September 2025
17:00

Boxscore

Israel	96–106	Slovenia
Scoring by quarter: 22–26, 21–30, 22–23, 31–27
Pts: Avdija 34; Rebs: Sorkin 11; Asts: Madar 8		Pts: Dončić 37; Rebs: Dončić 11; Asts: Dončić 9

Spodek, Katowice
Attendance: 5,285
Referees: Takaki Kato (JPN), Gatis Saliņš (LAT), Mihkel Männiste (EST)

=== Poland vs Belgium ===
4 September 2025
20:30

Boxscore

Poland	69–70	Belgium
Scoring by quarter: 17–16, 16–23, 25–19, 11–12
Pts: Ponitka 16; Rebs: Ponitka 9 Asts: Pluta 6		Pts: Lecomte 19; Rebs: Vanwijn 7 Asts: Mwema 5

Spodek, Katowice
Attendance: 8,666
Referees: Andris Aunkrogers (LAT), Kerem Baki (TUR), Zafer Yılmaz (TUR)
