= Muurinen =

Muurinen is a Finnish surname. Notable people with the surname include:

- Antti Muurinen (born 1954), Finnish football coach
- Kimmo Muurinen (born 1981), Finnish basketball player
- Miikka Muurinen (born 2007), Finnish basketball player
