= EuroBasket 2025 =

International basketball event

Ευρωπαϊκό Πρωτάθλημα Καλαθοσφαίρισης 2025 (in Greek) 2025 Avrupa Basketbol Şampiyonası (in Turkish) Koripallon Euroopan-mestaruuskilpailut 2025 (in Finnish) Europamästerskapet i basket för herrar 2025 (in Swedish) Mistrzostwa Europy w Koszykówce Mężczyzn 2025 (in Polish): 2025. gada Eiropas čempionāts basketbolā; (in Latvian)
- Achieved stages by country

Tournament details
- Host countries: Cyprus; Finland; Poland; Latvia
- Dates: August 27 – September 14, 2025
- Teams: 24
- Venues: 4 (in 4 host cities)

Final positions
- Champions: Germany (2nd title)
- Runners-up: Turkey
- Third place: Greece
- Fourth place: Finland

Tournament statistics
- Games played: 76
- Attendance: 470,144 (6,186 per game)
- MVP: (Germany) Dennis Schröder
- Top scorer: (Slovenia) Luka Dončić (34.7 ppg)
- Top rebounds: (Montenegro) Nikola Vučević (11.6 rpg)
- Top assists: (Germany) Dennis Schröder (7.2 apg)
- PPG (Team): Germany (99.9 ppg)
- RPG (Team): Lithuania (41.1 rpg)
- APG (Team): Serbia (23.7 apg)

Official website
- www.fiba.basketball

The EuroBasket 2025 was the 42nd edition of the EuroBasket championship, the quadrennial international men's basketball championship organized by FIBA Europe. It took place from 27 August to 14 September 2025, returning to its usual calendar slot, after the previous tournament was postponed by a year due to the COVID-19 pandemic. Like the previous three editions, the tournament was co-hosted by multiple countries; Cyprus, Finland, Poland, and Latvia.

Spain, the defending champions, were eliminated in the group stage. It was their earliest exit in a 36-year stint since Yugoslavia 1989 and the earliest exit by a defending champion since Germany in EuroBasket 1995.

Finland became the first Nordic country to reach the semi-final of the tournament, falling against Germany. The latter went on to finish the competition undefeated after beating Turkey 88–83 in the final to be crowned champions of Europe. It was the reigning world champions second title in history, achieved after 32 years since EuroBasket 1993. Greece claimed bronze medals by defeating Finland 92–89. Germany's point guard Dennis Schröder was recognized as the FIBA EuroBasket MVP.

== Host selection ==
FIBA Europe opened three bidding options for hosting: to host a group, to host the final round or to host the entire tournament. The EuroBasket in 2015, 2017 and 2022, tendered in the same way, each of these tournaments was hosted in four countries.

Six countries submitted separate candidacies to host Eurobasket 2025:

- Cyprus (Limassol)
- Finland (Tampere)
- Hungary (Budapest)
- Latvia (Riga)
- Russia (Perm)
- Ukraine (Kyiv, Lviv or Dnipro)

During its meeting on 28 March 2022, the FIBA Europe Board selected Latvia, Cyprus and Finland to host the tournament, with Latvia hosting the knockout phase. Ukraine was an option to be the fourth host during the group stage. Due to the Russian invasion of Ukraine, Poland was named the fourth country to play host.

== Venues ==
Riga is the host city for Latvia and selected for the tournament's final phase. Limassol is the host city for Cyprus. On 6 March 2023, Tampere was announced as the host city for Finland. On March 17, Katowice was announced as the host city for Poland. In June 2023, a draw determined which group will be played at each venue: Group A in Riga, Group B in Tampere, Group C in Limassol and Group D in Katowice.

Riga	Tampere	
Xiaomi Arena; Capacity: 11,200	Nokia Arena; Capacity: 13,455	Host cities
Limassol	Katowice	Host cities
Spyros Kyprianou Athletic Center; Capacity: 8,000	Spodek; Capacity: 11,036	Host cities

== Branding ==
The official logo was unveiled on 5 December 2023.

The visual identity was developed in close cooperation with the four host cities—Limassol, Tampere, Katowice, and Riga—and is characterized by a bold, architectural aesthetic designed to make a lasting impression for the 42nd edition of Europe’s flagship basketball tournament.

Each host city is represented through distinct color combinations embedded within the tournament’s broader visual identity.

According to FIBA’s Official Technical Supplier, the visual identity—including the logo—is further reinforced on-court via an innovative custom print technology. This allows court designs to feature three-dimensional effects, color gradients, and layered transparency, turning the playing surface into an immersive visual extension of the tournament branding.

== Qualification ==
Map of qualifiers for the EuroBasket 2025: Team qualified for EuroBasket 2025 Team failed to qualify Team disqualified Did not enter

40 teams took part in qualification, including the four co-hosts who participated for preparation reasons.

The qualification process started in November 2021, with ten teams participating in the pre-qualifiers, including the eight eliminated teams from the 2023 World Cup European Pre-Qualifiers minus Russia and Belarus, who were banned from competing because of the ongoing military action in Ukraine. Eight teams progressed from the pre-qualifiers to the main qualifiers where 32 countries were split into eight groups of four, with the top three from each group qualifying for EuroBasket. The qualifiers draw was held on 8 August 2023 in Munich, Germany.

Of the 24 qualified teams, 19 of them were present in the previous edition. Co-host Cyprus will make their debut at the edition. Portugal returns after a fourteen year absence having last appeared in 2011. Sweden progressed to the finals for the first time since 2013. Co-host Latvia and Iceland will return after missing out on 2022.

Of the teams who failed to qualify, Croatia missed out for the first time ever. Ukraine also failed to progress for the first time since 2009. After taking part in 2017 and 2022, Hungary didn't qualify. Bulgaria and Netherlands failed to qualify after their sporadic appearance in 2022.

Georgia continued their perfect streak of making every edition since their debut. Montenegro made their third consecutive appearance at EuroBasket for the first time ever.

=== Qualified teams ===
Team	Qualification method	Date of qualification	Appearance(s)				Previous best performance	World Ranking	
Team	Qualification method	Date of qualification	Total	First	Last	Streak	Previous best performance	Bef	Aft
Cyprus	Host nation	29 March 2022	1st	—	—	1	Debut	78	84
Finland	Host nation	29 March 2022	18th	1939	2022	6	Sixth place (1967)	24	20
Latvia	Host nation	29 March 2022	15th	1935	2017	1	Champions (1935)	29	9
Poland	Host nation	17 September 2022	30th	1937	2022	8	Runners-up (1963)	14	17
Serbia	Group G top two	24 November 2024	8th	2007	2022	8	Runners-up (2009, 2017)	6	2
Lithuania	Group H top two	24 November 2024	16th	1937	2022	14	Champions (1937, 1939, 2003)	8	10
Slovenia	Group A top three	25 November 2024	15th	1993	2022	15	Champions (2017)	7	11
Israel	Group A top three	25 November 2024	31st	1953	2022	15	Runners-up (1979)	34	39
Turkey	Group B top three	25 November 2024	26th	1949	2022	15	Runners-up (2001)	16	27
Italy	Group B top three	25 November 2024	39th	1935	2022	6	Champions (1983, 1999)	10	14
Spain	Group C top two	25 November 2024	33rd	1935	2022	32	Champions (2009, 2011, 2015, 2022)	1	5
Belgium	Group C top two	20 February 2025	19th	1935	2022	6	Fourth place (1947)	30	40
Greece	Group F top three	21 February 2025	29th	1949	2022	18	Champions (1987, 2005)	9	13
Georgia	Group G top two	21 February 2025	6th	2011	2022	6	11th place (2011)	32	24
Estonia	Group H top two	21 February 2025	7th	1937	2022	2	Fifth place (1937, 1939)	44	43
Great Britain	Group F top three	21 February 2025	6th	2009	2022	3	13th place (2009, 2011, 2013)	48	48
Czech Republic	Group F top three	21 February 2025	7th	1999	2022	5	Seventh place (2015)	12	19
France	Group E top two	21 February 2025	40th	1935	2022	23	Champions (2013)	5	4
Bosnia and Herzegovina	Group E top two	21 February 2025	11th	1993	2022	2	Eighth place (1993)	35	41
Portugal	Group A top three	21 February 2025	4th	1951	2011	1	Ninth place (2007)	54	56
Germany	Group D top three	23 February 2025	26th	1951	2022	15	Champions (1993)	11	3
Montenegro	Group D top three	23 February 2025	5th	2011	2022	3	13th place (2017, 2022)	18	16
Sweden	Group D top three	23 February 2025	11th	1953	2013	1	11th place (1995)	50	49
Iceland	Group B top three	23 February 2025	3rd	2015	2017	1	24th place (2015, 2017)	49	50

== Draw ==
The allocation draw for the hosting nations was advanced by the FIBA Europe Board in its June 2023 meeting and was held during the Final Phase of EuroBasket Women 2023 in Ljubljana on 24 June 2023. The Group A got pulled for Latvia, Group B for Finland, Group C for Cyprus and Group D for Poland.

After the tournament seedings got finalised, each of the hosting federations were granted the right to select a partner federation from non-corresponding pots to be pre-paired together for the draw capitalizing on commercial and marketing criteria. Latvia's choice was Estonia, Finland's choice was Lithuania, Cyprus's choice was Greece and Poland's choice was Iceland. Given the selections involved three of four teams from the Seed 2, Slovenia was consequently also guaranteed into Group D with Poland.

The main draw took place in Riga, Latvia on 27 March 2025.

=== Seeding ===
The 24 qualified teams were seeded according to the FIBA Men's World Ranking. The seeding was announced on 25 February 2025. In bold are the teams that host the tournament.

Seed 1
Team	Pos
Serbia	2
Germany	3
France	4
Spain	5

Seed 2
Team	Pos
**Latvia**	9
Lithuania	10
Slovenia	11
Greece	13

Seed 3
Team	Pos
Italy	14
Montenegro	16
**Poland**	17
Czech Republic	19

Seed 4
Team	Pos
**Finland**	20
Georgia	24
Turkey	27
Israel	39

Seed 5
Team	Pos
Belgium	40
Bosnia and Herzegovina	41
Estonia	43
Great Britain	48

Seed 6
Team	Pos
Sweden	49
Iceland	50
Portugal	56
**Cyprus**	85

== Referees ==
The following 45 referees were selected for the tournament.

- (Belgium) Geert Jacobs
- (Bosnia and Herzegovina) Ademir Zurapović
- (Bulgaria) Martin Horozov
- (Bulgaria) Ventsislav Velikov
- (Canada) Matthew Kallio
- (Croatia) Josip Jurčević
- (Croatia) Martin Vulić
- (Cyprus) Ilias Kounelles
- (Czech Republic) Ivor Matějek
- (Estonia) Mihkel Männiste
- (France) Nicolas Maestre
- (France) Yohan Rosso
- (Germany) Carsten Straube
- (Greece) Georgios Poursanidis
- (Hungary) Péter Praksch
- (Israel) Ofer Manheim
- (Italy) Lorenzo Baldini
- (Italy) Saverio Lanzarini
- (Japan) Takaki Kato
- (Latvia) Andris Aunkrogers
- (Latvia) Mārtiņš Kozlovskis
- (Latvia) Gatis Saliņš
- (Lithuania) Juozas Barkauskas
- (Lithuania) Gvidas Gedvilas
- (Lithuania) Gintaras Mačiulis
- (Norway) Viola Györgyi
- (Panama) Julio Anaya
- (Poland) Wojciech Liszka
- (Poland) Michał Proc
- (Poland) Dariusz Zapolski
- (Portugal) Paulo Marques
- (Puerto Rico) Jorge Vázquez
- (Romania) Marius Ciulin
- (Serbia) Petar Pešić
- (Serbia) Siniša Prpa
- (Slovenia) Boris Krejić
- (Spain) Fernando Calatrava
- (Spain) Luis Castillo
- (Spain) Ariadna Chueca
- (Spain) Antonio Conde
- (Turkey) Kerem Baki
- (Turkey) Yener Yılmaz
- (Turkey) Zafer Yılmaz
- (Ukraine) Serhiy Zashchuk
- (United States) Gediminas Petraitis

== Squads ==
Each team consists of 12 players.

== Group phase ==
The schedule was announced on 30 April 2025.

=== Group A ===
The games were played at the Xiaomi Arena in Riga, Latvia.

Pos	Team	Pld	W	L	PF	PA	PD	Pts	Qualification
1	Turkey	5	5	0	459	359	+100	10	Knockout stage
2	Serbia	5	4	1	434	368	+66	9	Knockout stage
3	Latvia (H)	5	3	2	412	384	+28	8	Knockout stage
4	Portugal	5	2	3	315	368	−53	7	Knockout stage
5	Estonia	5	1	4	352	397	−45	6	
6	Czech Republic	5	0	5	338	434	−96	5	

Source: FIBA
Rules for classification: 1) Points; 2) Head-to-head results; 3) Points difference; 4) Points scored.
(H) Hosts

27 August 2025
Czech Republic	50–62	Portugal
Latvia	73–93	Turkey
Serbia	98–64	Estonia
29 August 2025
Turkey	92–78	Czech Republic
Estonia	70–72	Latvia
Portugal	69–80	Serbia
30 August 2025
Czech Republic	75–89	Estonia
Latvia	80–84	Serbia
Turkey	95–54	Portugal
1 September 2025
Estonia	64–84	Turkey
Portugal	62–78	Latvia
Serbia	82–60	Czech Republic
3 September 2025
Estonia	65–68	Portugal
Czech Republic	75–109	Latvia
Turkey	95–90	Serbia

=== Group B ===
The games were played at the Nokia Arena in Tampere, Finland.

Pos	Team	Pld	W	L	PF	PA	PD	Pts	Qualification
1	Germany	5	5	0	529	365	+164	10	Knockout stage
2	Lithuania	5	4	1	431	393	+38	9	Knockout stage
3	Finland (H)	5	3	2	426	406	+20	8	Knockout stage
4	Sweden	5	1	4	403	418	−15	6 (Note: Sweden 3 Pts, +13 PD; Montenegro 3 Pts, 0 PD; Great Britain 3 Pts, −13 PD)	Knockout stage
5	Montenegro	5	1	4	378	455	−77	6	
6	Great Britain	5	1	4	354	484	−130	6	

Source: FIBA
Rules for classification: 1) Points; 2) Head-to-head results; 3) Points difference; 4) Points scored.
(H) Hosts
Notes:

27 August 2025
Great Britain	70–94	Lithuania
Montenegro	76–106	Germany
Sweden	90–93	Finland
29 August 2025
Germany	105–83	Sweden
Lithuania	94–67	Montenegro
Finland	109–79	Great Britain
30 August 2025
Lithuania	88–107	Germany
Great Britain	59–78	Sweden
Montenegro	66–85	Finland
1 September 2025
Sweden	81–87	Montenegro
Germany	120–57	Great Britain
Finland	78–81	Lithuania
3 September 2025
Montenegro	83–89	Great Britain
Lithuania	74–71	Sweden
Finland	61–91	Germany

=== Group C ===
The games were played at the Spyros Kyprianou Athletic Center in Limassol, Cyprus.

Pos	Team	Pld	W	L	PF	PA	PD	Pts	Qualification
1	Greece	5	4	1	432	354	+78	9 (Note: Greece 75–66 Italy)	Knockout stage
2	Italy	5	4	1	396	333	+63	9	Knockout stage
3	Bosnia and Herzegovina	5	3	2	401	401	0	8	Knockout stage
4	Georgia	5	2	3	367	386	−19	7 (Note: Georgia 83–69 Spain)	Knockout stage
5	Spain	5	2	3	397	354	+43	7	
6	Cyprus (H)	5	0	5	295	460	−165	5	

Source: FIBA
Rules for classification: 1) Points; 2) Head-to-head results; 3) Points difference; 4) Points scored.
(H) Hosts
Notes:

28 August 2025
Georgia	83–69	Spain
Bosnia and Herzegovina	91–64	Cyprus
Greece	75–66	Italy
30 August 2025
Italy	78–62	Georgia
Cyprus	69–96	Greece
Spain	88–67	Bosnia and Herzegovina
31 August 2025
Georgia	53–94	Greece
Spain	91–47	Cyprus
Bosnia and Herzegovina	79–96	Italy
2 September 2025
Greece	77–80	Bosnia and Herzegovina
Cyprus	61–93	Georgia
Italy	67–63	Spain
4 September 2025
Bosnia and Herzegovina	84–76	Georgia
Italy	89–54	Cyprus
Spain	86–90	Greece

=== Group D ===
The games were played at the Spodek in Katowice, Poland.

Pos	Team	Pld	W	L	PF	PA	PD	Pts	Qualification
1	France	5	4	1	461	391	+70	9	Knockout stage
2	Poland (H)	5	3	2	400	387	+13	8 (Note: Poland 4 Pts; Slovenia 3 pts; Israel 2 pts)	Knockout stage
3	Slovenia	5	3	2	469	452	+17	8	Knockout stage
4	Israel	5	3	2	417	401	+16	8	Knockout stage
5	Belgium	5	2	3	363	403	−40	7	
6	Iceland	5	0	5	363	439	−76	5	

Source: FIBA
Rules for classification: 1) Points; 2) Head-to-head results; 3) Points difference; 4) Points scored.
(H) Hosts
Notes:

28 August 2025
Israel	83–71	Iceland
Belgium	64–92	France
Slovenia	95–105	Poland
30 August 2025
Iceland	64–71	Belgium
France	103–95	Slovenia
Poland	66–64	Israel
31 August 2025
Slovenia	86–69	Belgium
Israel	82–69	France
Poland	84–75	Iceland
2 September 2025
Belgium	89–92	Israel
Iceland	79–87	Slovenia
France	83–76	Poland
4 September 2025
France	114–74	Iceland
Israel	96–106	Slovenia
Poland	69–70	Belgium

== Final phase ==
Matches are played at the Xiaomi Arena in Riga.

=== Bracket ===
Round of 16
6 September
B2 Lithuania	88
A3 Latvia	79
7 September
C1 Greece	84
D4 Israel	79
6 September
A1 Turkey	85
B4 Sweden	79
7 September
D2 Poland	80
C3 Bosnia and Herzegovina	72
6 September
B1 Germany	85
A4 Portugal	58
7 September
C2 Italy	77
D3 Slovenia	84
6 September
A2 Serbia	86
B3 Finland	92
7 September
D1 France	70
C4 Georgia	80

Quarterfinals
9 September
B2 Lithuania	76
C1 Greece	87
9 September
A1 Turkey	91
D2 Poland	77
10 September
B1 Germany	99
D3 Slovenia	91
10 September
B3 Finland	93
C4 Georgia	79

Semifinals
12 September
C1 Greece	68
A1 Turkey	94
12 September
B1 Germany	98
B3 Finland	86

Final
14 September
A1 Turkey	83
B1 Germany	88
Third place
14 September
C1 Greece	92
B3 Finland	89

=== Final ===
14 September 2025
21:00

Boxscore

Turkey	83–88	Germany
Scoring by quarter: 22–24, 24–16, 21–26, 16–22
Pts: Şengün 28; Rebs: Larkin 6 Asts: Larkin 9		Pts: Bonga 20; Rebs: Wagner 8 Asts: Schröder 12

Xiaomi Arena, Riga
Attendance: 11,000
Referees: Matthew Kallio (CAN), Ademir Zurapović (BIH), Yohan Rosso (FRA)

== Final standings ==
Teams were ranked according to the Official Basketball Rules, with earned position as the primary criterion, followed by the group phase overall record and point differential. Assuming all these factors are equal, the World Ranking would have served as the last competitive tiebraker.

Achieved a new record position in the championship.

Rank	Team	GP	W/L	Group phase results					FIBA World Rankings		
Rank	Team	GP	W/L	Plc	Pts	PF	PA	PD	Before	After	Change
1st place, gold medalist(s)	Germany	9	9–0	1st	10	529	365	+164	3	2	1
2nd place, silver medalist(s)	Turkey	9	8–1	1st	10	459	359	+100	27	12	15
3rd place, bronze medalist(s)	Greece	9	7–2	1st	9	432	354	+78	13		Steady
4	Finland	9	5–4	3rd	8	426	406	+20	20	17	3
Eliminated in quarterfinals
5	Lithuania	7	5–2	2nd	9	431	393	+38	10	9	1
6	Poland	7	4–3	2nd	8	400	387	+13	17	19	2
7	Slovenia	7	4–3	3rd	8	469	452	+17	11	14	3
8	Georgia	7	3–4	4th	7	367	386	−19	24	20	4
Eliminated in round of 16
9	France	6	4–2	1st	9	461	391	+70	4		Steady
10	Serbia	6	4–2	2nd	9	434	368	+66	2	3	1
11	Italy	6	4–2	2nd	9	396	333	+63	14	15	1
12	Latvia	6	3–3	3rd	8	412	384	+28	9	11	2
13	Bosnia and Herzegovina	6	3–3	3rd	8	401	401	0	41	33	8
14	Israel	6	3–3	4th	8	417	401	+16	39	32	7
15	Portugal	6	2–4	4th	7	315	368	−53	56	47	9
16	Sweden	6	1–5	4th	6	403	418	−15	49	40	9
Eliminated in group phase
17	Spain	5	2–3	5th	7	397	354	+43	5	7	2
18	Belgium	5	2–3	5th	7	363	403	−40	40	35	5
19	Estonia	5	1–4	5th	6	352	397	−45	43	39	4
20	Montenegro	5	1–4	5th	6	378	455	−77	16	18	2
21	Great Britain	5	1–4	6th	6	354	484	−130	48	43	5
22	Iceland	5	0–5	6th	5	363	439	−76	50	46	4
23	Czech Republic	5	0–5	6th	5	338	434	−96	19	23	4
24	Cyprus	5	0–5	6th	5	295	460	−165	84	71	13

== Awards ==
The following awards were presented at the conclusion of the championship.

EuroBasket MVP
(Germany) Dennis Schröder
FIBA EuroBasket Final MVP
(Germany) Isaac Bonga
FIBA EuroBasket All-Tournament Team
(Germany) Dennis Schröder	(Germany) Franz Wagner	(Turkey) Alperen Şengün	(Greece) Giannis Antetokounmpo	(Slovenia) Luka Dončić
FIBA EuroBasket All-Tournament Second Team
(Turkey) Cedi Osman	(Finland) Lauri Markkanen	(Poland) Jordan Loyd	(Israel) Deni Avdija	(Serbia) Nikola Jokić
EuroBasket Best Coach
(Turkey) Ergin Ataman
EuroBasket Rising Star
(Finland) Miikka Muurinen
EuroBasket Best Defensive Player
(Germany) Isaac Bonga

== Statistics ==
=== Statistical leaders ===
As of 12 September 2025

Italic text indicates that a subject is no longer active in the tournament after the update date.

==== Players ====
Points Per Game
#	Player	Pld	Pts	PPG
1	(Slovenia) **Luka Dončić**	7	243	34.7
2	(Greece) Giannis Antetokounmpo	6	161	26.8
3	(Israel) Deni Avdija	6	144	24.0
4	(Finland) Lauri Markkanen	8	189	23.6
5	(Poland) Jordan Loyd	7	157	22.4
6	(Serbia) Nikola Jokić	6	134	22.3
7	(Germany) Franz Wagner	8	169	21.1
8	(Germany) Dennis Schröder	8	167	20.9
9	(Turkey) Alperen Şengün	8	166	20.8
9	(Montenegro) Nikola Vučević	5	104	20.8

Efficiency
#	Player	Pld	MPG	PPG	Eff	EffPG
1	(Slovenia) **Luka Dončić**	7	33.3	34.7	256	36.6
2	(Turkey) Alperen Şengün	8	30.5	20.8	242	30.3
2	(Serbia) Nikola Jokić	6	27.0	22.3	182	30.3
4	(Greece) Giannis Antetokounmpo	6	29.5	26.8	178	29.7
5	(Montenegro) Nikola Vučević	5	33.9	20.8	139	27.8
6	(Finland) Lauri Markkanen	8	28.6	23.6	193	24.1
7	(Iceland) Tryggvi Hlinason	5	33.6	14.6	119	23.8
8	(Israel) Deni Avdija	6	33.0	24.0	141	23.5
9	(Germany) Franz Wagner	8	26.1	21.1	177	22.1
10	(Latvia) Kristaps Porziņģis	6	27.2	20.2	126	21.0

Rebounds
#	Player	Pld	Rebs	RPG
1	**(Montenegro) Nikola Vučević**	5	58	11.6
2	(Turkey) Alperen Şengün	8	88	11.0
3	(Iceland) Tryggvi Hlinason	5	53	10.6
4	(Greece) Giannis Antetokounmpo	6	57	9.5
5	(Serbia) Nikola Jokić	6	54	9.0
6	(Bosnia and Herzegovina) Jusuf Nurkić	6	52	8.7
6	(Latvia) Kristaps Porziņģis	6	52	8.7
8	(Slovenia) Luka Dončić	7	60	8.6
9	(Sweden) Simon Birgander	5	42	8.4
10	(Poland) Mateusz Ponitka	7	57	8.1

Assists
#	Player	Pld	Asts	APG
1	(Lithuania) **Rokas Jokubaitis**	4	34	8.5
2	(Slovenia) Luka Dončić	7	50	7.1
3	(Turkey) Alperen Şengün	8	56	7.0
4	(Germany) Dennis Schröder	8	53	6.6
4	(Czech Republic) Ondřej Sehnal	5	33	6.6
5	(Israel) Yam Madar	6	38	6.3
7	(Bosnia and Herzegovina) Edin Atić	6	35	5.8
7	(Latvia) Rihards Lomažs	6	35	5.8
9	(Serbia) Stefan Jović	6	33	5.5
10	(Lithuania) Arnas Velička	7	38	5.4
10	(United Kingdom) Luke Nelson	5	27	5.4

Steals
#	Player	Pld	Stls	SPG
1	(Slovenia) **Luka Dončić**	7	19	2.7
1	**(Israel) Yam Madar**	6	16	2.7
3	(Portugal) Travante Williams	6	15	2.5
4	(Finland) Lauri Markkanen	8	18	2.3
5	(Bosnia and Herzegovina) Edin Atić	6	14	2.3
6	(Israel) Deni Avdija	6	12	2.0
7	(Serbia) Nikola Jokić	6	11	1.8
8	(Italy) Alessandro Pajola	6	10	1.7
9	(Czech Republic) Jaromír Bohačík	5	8	1.6
9	(Estonia) Janari Jõesaar	5	8	1.6
9	(United Kingdom) Akwasi Yeboah	5	8	1.6

Blocks
#	Player	Pld	Blks	BPG
1	(Iceland) **Tryggvi Hlinason**	5	12	2.4
2	(Georgia (country)) Goga Bitadze	5	9	1.8
3	(Portugal) Neemias Queta	6	10	1.7
3	(Latvia) Kristaps Porziņģis	6	10	1.7
5	(Sweden) Simon Birgander	5	8	1.6
6	(Greece) Kostas Antetokounmpo	8	12	1.5
7	(Germany) Daniel Theis	8	9	1.1
8	(Turkey) Adem Bona	8	8	1.0
8	(Bosnia and Herzegovina) Jusuf Nurkić	6	6	1.0
8	(Belgium) Ismaël Bako	5	5	1.0

Minutes
#	Player	Pld	Mins	MPG
1	(Montenegro) **Nikola Vučević**	5	169	33.9
2	(Iceland) Tryggvi Hlinason	5	167	33.6
3	(Slovenia) Luka Dončić	7	233	33.3
4	(Israel) Deni Avdija	6	197	33.0
5	(Poland) Mateusz Ponitka	7	230	32.9
6	(Georgia (country)) Alexander Mamukelashvili	7	224	32.1
7	(Poland) Jordan Loyd	7	224	32.0
8	(Turkey) Shane Larkin	8	249	31.2
9	(Poland) Michal Sokolowski	7	217	31.0
10	(Turkey) Alperen Şengün	8	243	30.5
10	(Georgia (country)) Kamar Baldwin	7	213	30.5

Field Goal Shooting
#	Player	Pld	FGM	FGA	FG%
1	(Greece) **Giannis Antetokounmpo**	6	65	97	67.0
2	(Serbia) Nikola Jokić	6	47	71	66.2
3	(Lithuania) Jonas Valančiūnas	7	44	68	64.7
4	(Georgia (country)) Goga Bitadze	6	36	62	58.1
6	(Turkey) Ercan Osmani	8	38	66	57.6
6	(Portugal) Neemias Queta	6	34	59	57.6
7	(Montenegro) Nikola Vučević	5	41	73	56.2
8	(Turkey) Alperen Şengün	8	61	109	56.0
9	(Czech Republic) Martin Peterka	5	23	42	54.8
10	(Estonia) Artur Konontšuk	5	23	43	53.5

3 Point Field Goals
#	Player	Pld	3PM	3PA	3P%
1	**(Turkey) Ercan Osmani**	8	17	30	56.7
2	(Montenegro) Nikola Vučević	5	9	16	56.2
3	(Lithuania) Rokas Jokubaitis	4	5	9	55.6
4	(United Kingdom) Jelani Watson-Gayle	4	7	13	53.8
5	(Georgia (country)) Tornike Shengelia	7	11	21	52.4
5	(Sweden) Melwin Pantzar	6	11	21	52.4
5	(Serbia) Nikola Jović	6	11	21	52.4
8	(Czech Republic) Martin Peterka	5	13	25	52.0
9	(Turkey) Cedi Osman	8	23	46	50.0
9	(Germany) Tristan da Silva	8	15	30	50.0
9	(Turkey) Kenan Sipahi	8	11	22	50.0
9	(Latvia) Dairis Bertāns	6	11	22	50.0
9	(Israel) Khadeen Carrington	6	8	16	50.0

Free Throws
#	Player	Pld	FTM	FTA	FT%
1	(France) **Sylvain Francisco**	6	20	21	95.2
2	(Belgium) Emmanuel Lecomte	5	14	15	93.3
3	(Iceland) Elvar Már Friðriksson	5	22	24	91.7
4	(Montenegro) Marko Simonović	5	19	21	90.5
5	(Germany) Dennis Schröder	8	36	41	87.8
5	(Slovenia) Luka Dončić	7	86	98	87.8
7	(Poland) Jordan Loyd	7	42	48	87.5
8	(Finland) Lauri Markkanen	8	55	63	87.3
9	(Italy) Simone Fontecchio	6	19	22	86.4
10	(Germany) Franz Wagner	8	57	67	85.1

Double-Doubles
#	Player	Pld	DD	DD%	TD
1	**(Montenegro) Nikola Vučević**	5	4	80.0	0
1	**(Iceland) Tryggvi Hlinason**	5	4	80.0	0
1	**(Turkey) Alperen Şengün**	8	4	50.0	1
4	(Bosnia and Herzegovina) Jusuf Nurkić	6	3	50.0	0
4	(Serbia) Nikola Jokić	6	3	50.0	0
4	(Greece) Giannis Antetokounmpo	6	3	50.0	0
4	(Lithuania) Ąžuolas Tubelis	7	3	42.9	0
4	(Slovenia) Luka Dončić	7	3	42.9	1
9	(Sweden) Simon Birgander	5	2	40.0	0
9	(Portugal) Neemias Queta	6	2	33.3	0
9	(Poland) Mateusz Ponitka	7	2	28.6	0
9	(Finland) Lauri Markkanen	8	2	25.0	0

=== Teams ===
Points
#	Team	Pld	Pts	PPG
1	**Germany**	8	811	101.4
2	Slovenia	7	644	92.0
3	Turkey	8	729	91.1
4	France	6	531	88.5
5	Finland	8	697	87.1
6	Serbia	6	520	86.7
7	Lithuania	7	595	85.0
8	Greece	8	671	83.9
9	Israel	6	496	82.7
10	Latvia	6	491	81.8

Rebounds
#	Team	Pld	Rebs	RPG
1	**Lithuania**	7	288	41.1
2	Finland	8	321	40.1
2	Germany	8	321	40.1
4	France	6	233	38.8
5	Slovenia	7	270	38.6
6	Portugal	6	227	37.8
6	Serbia	6	227	37.8
6	Spain	5	189	37.8
9	Italy	6	224	37.3
10	Bosnia and Herzegovina	6	223	37.2
10	Iceland	5	186	37.2

Assists
#	Team	Pld	Asts	APG
1	**Serbia**	6	142	23.7
2	Turkey	8	184	23.0
3	Finland	8	182	22.8
4	Lithuania	7	153	21.9
5	Germany	8	171	21.4
6	Spain	5	106	21.2
7	Italy	6	126	21.0
8	Latvia	6	122	20.3
8	Sweden	6	122	20.3
10	Bosnia and Herzegovina	6	121	20.2

Steals
#	Team	Pld	Stls	SPG
1	**Great Britain**	5	45	9.0
2	Germany	8	70	8.8
3	Italy	6	51	8.5
4	France	6	50	8.3
5	Portugal	6	49	8.2
6	Greece	8	63	7.9
7	Israel	6	47	7.8
8	Lithuania	7	54	7.7
9	Turkey	8	60	7.5
9	Bosnia and Herzegovina	6	45	7.5

Blocks
#	Team	Pld	Blks	BPG
1	**France**	6	27	4.5
2	Germany	8	32	4.0
3	Latvia	6	21	3.5
3	Sweden	6	21	3.5
5	Greece	8	27	3.4
5	Turkey	8	27	3.4
7	Iceland	5	16	3.2
8	Finland	8	24	3.0
9	Serbia	6	17	2.8
9	Belgium	5	14	2.8

Field Goal Shooting
#	Team	Pld	FGM	FGA	FG%
1	Turkey	8	257	490	52.4
2	**Germany**	8	281	546	51.5
3	Serbia	6	182	358	50.8
4	Greece	8	243	484	50.2
5	Lithuania	7	211	441	47.8
6	Sweden	6	183	390	46.9
7	Poland	7	182	397	45.8
8	Slovenia	7	206	452	45.6
9	Montenegro	5	135	298	45.3
10	France	6	190	423	44.9

3 Point Field Goals
#	Team	Pld	3PM	3PA	3PT%
1	**Turkey**	8	89	199	44.7
2	Germany	8	98	251	39.0
3	Greece	8	78	203	38.4
4	Belgium	5	47	124	37.9
5	Finland	8	98	265	37.0
6	Montenegro	5	41	118	34.7
7	Poland	7	60	175	34.3
7	Latvia	6	73	213	34.3
9	Serbia	6	52	153	34.0
10	Sweden	6	51	151	33.8

Free Throws
#	Team	Pld	FTM	FTA	FT%
1	**Serbia**	6	104	126	82.5
2	Germany	8	151	188	80.3
3	Slovenia	7	155	194	79.9
4	Latvia	6	96	121	79.3
5	Great Britain	5	77	99	77.8
6	Cyprus	5	30	39	76.9
7	Finland	8	107	142	75.4
8	France	6	96	128	75.0
9	Israel	6	101	135	74.8
10	Italy	6	100	134	74.6

=== Game highs ===
The bolded total denotes the highest overall performance in the tournament.

==== Players ====
Category	Phase	Player	Team	Opponent	Total
Points	Gr.	Lauri Markkanen	Finland	Great Britain	**43**
Points	Fin.	Luka Dončić	Slovenia	Italy	42
Rebounds	Fin.	Kristaps Porziņģis	Latvia	Lithuania	**19**
Rebounds	Gr.	Neemias Queta	Portugal	Czech Republic	18
Assists	Gr.	Rokas Jokubaitis	Lithuania	Montenegro	**12**
Assists	Fin.	Dennis Schröder	Germany	Finland	**12**
Steals	Gr.	Travante Williams	Portugal	Czech Republic	**5**
Steals	Gr.	Travante Williams	Portugal	Serbia	**5**
Steals	Gr.	Luka Dončić	Slovenia	Poland	**5**
Steals	Gr.	Alessandro Pajola	Italy	Georgia	**5**
Steals	Gr.	Deni Avdija	Israel	France	**5**
Steals	Fin.	Yam Madar	Israel	Greece	**5**
Blocks	Gr.	Tryggvi Hlinason	Iceland	Belgium	**5**
Blocks	Fin.	Lauri Markkanen	Finland	Georgia	4
Blocks	Fin.	Kostas Antetokounmpo	Greece	Lithuania	4
Efficiency	Gr.	Luka Dončić	Slovenia	Israel	**45**
Efficiency	Fin.	Luka Dončić	Slovenia	Italy	43

==== Teams ====
Category	Phase	Team	Opponent	Total
Points	Gr.	Germany	Great Britain	**120**
Points	Fin.	Germany	Slovenia	99
Rebounds	Gr.	Lithuania	Great Britain	**57**
Rebounds	Fin.	Finland	Serbia	45
Rebounds	Fin.	Greece	Israel	45
Rebounds	Fin.	Slovenia	Germany	45
Rebounds	Fin.	Turkey	Sweden	45
Assists	Gr.	Lithuania	Montenegro	**35**
Assists	Fin.	Turkey	Greece	26
Assists	Fin.	Turkey	Poland	26
Assists	Fin.	Finland	Georgia	26
Steals	Gr.	Lithuania	Montenegro	**17**
Steals	Fin.	Finland	Serbia	11
Steals	Fin.	Greece	Israel	11
Blocks	Gr.	Germany	Finland	**10**
Blocks	Fin.	Turkey	Sweden	9
Efficiency	Gr.	Germany	Great Britain	**168**
Efficiency	Fin.	Finland	Georgia	120
Difference	Gr.	Germany	Great Britain	**63**
Difference	Fin.	Germany	Portugal	27
