= Eteri Andjaparidze =

Georgian/American pianist and music professor (born 1956)

- Born: September 15, 1956 (age 69); Tbilisi, Georgian SSR, USSR
- Occupations: Pianist, professor
- Instrument: Piano
- Years active: 1965–present
- Website: andjaparidze.com

Eteri Andjaparidze (Georgian: ეთერ ანჯაფარიძე; born September 15, 1956) is a Georgian-American pianist and music professor.

== Early life ==
Andjaparidze was born on September 15 1956, into a family of musicians in Tbilisi, Republic of Georgia. Her father, Zurab Andjaparidze (1928–1997), was the leading tenor with the Bolshoi Opera and her mother, Yvetta Bachtadze, was a pianist who gave Andjaparidze her first piano lessons. Her stepfather, Leonid Oakley (1923–1991) was a Georgian scientist. At age 5, Andjaparidze entered the Special Music School for Gifted Children in Tbilisi (studio of Meri Chavchanidze), and at age 8 debuted as a soloist with the Georgian State Symphony Orchestra and in solo recital at age 9. She studied at the Moscow State Tchaikovsky Conservatoire with Vera Gornostaeva.

== Career ==
Andjaparidze was the first Soviet pianist to win the Grand Prix at the Montreal International Piano Competition in 1976. In 1974, entering the Tchaikovsky International Competition as the youngest participant, Andjaparidze won fourth place.

She has appeared around the globe in solo and collaborative recitals and as a guest soloist with the major orchestras and conductors. Her programs encompass all genres and styles of the piano repertoire and discography includes Grammy and Deutsche Schallplatten awards nominated solo albums.

Currently a piano faculty at NYU Steinhardt and Mannes School of Music, Andjaparidze has taught at DePaul University, SUNY, Moscow and Tbilisi State Conservatoires and conducted masterclasses worldwide. She is the founder and artistic director of the advanced piano performance study program AmerKlavier.

Andjaparidze is a recipient of the International Friendship Order, the Order of Honor, and the People's Artist of Georgia title.

== Personal life ==
Andjaparidze's nephew is Georgian-American professional basketball player Sandro Mamukelashvili.
