= Miikka Muurinen =

Finnish basketball player (born 2007)

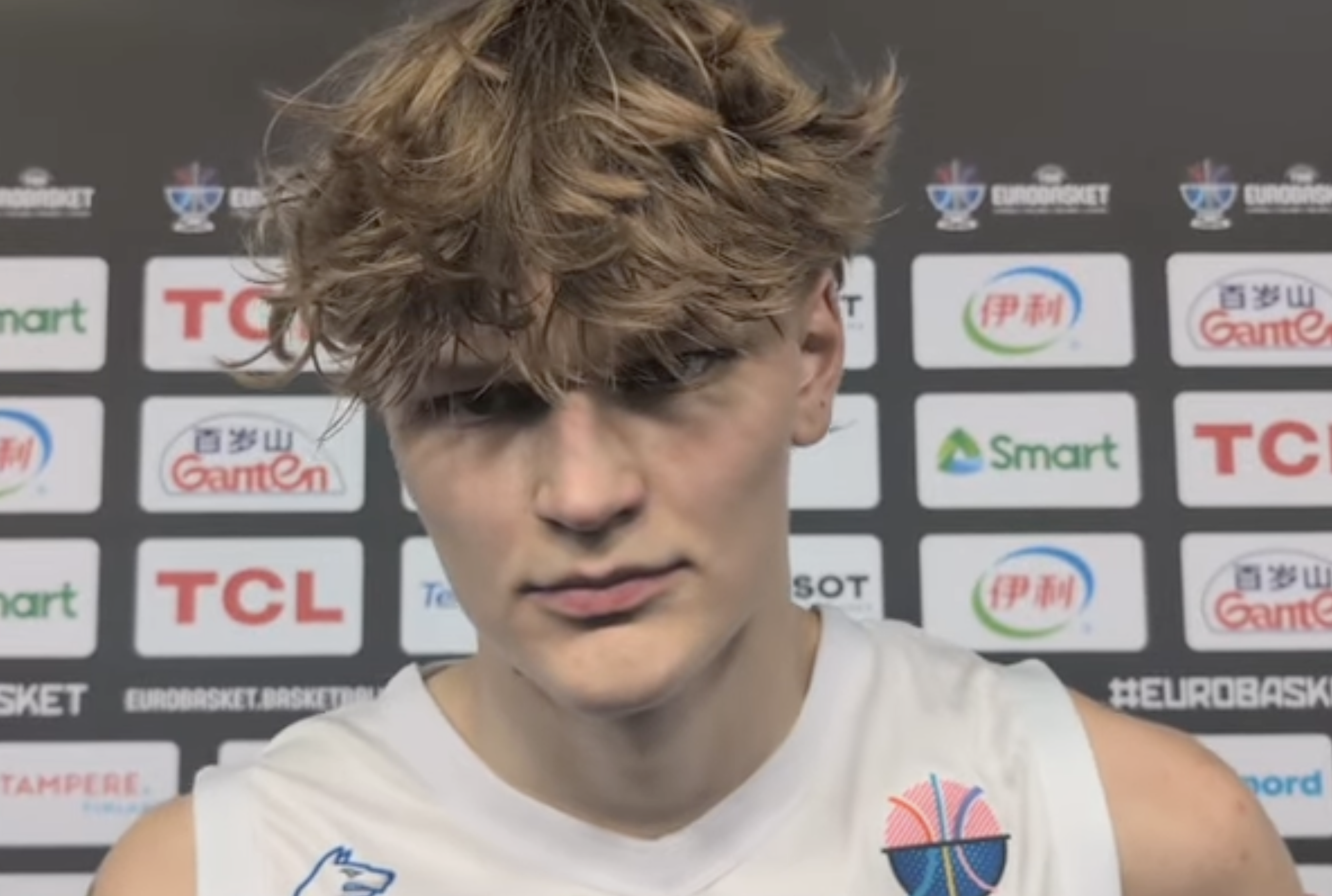
- Muurinen in 2025

No. 3 – Arkansas Razorbacks
- Position: Power forward
- League: SEC

Personal information
- Born: 4 March 2007 (age 19) Järvenpää, Finland
- Listed height: 2.13 m (7 ft 0 in)
- Listed weight: 97.5 kg (215 lb)

Career information
- High school: Sunrise Christian Academy (Bel Aire, Kansas); AZ Compass Prep (Chandler, Arizona)
- College: Arkansas (2026–present)
- Playing career: 2025–present

Career history
- 2025–2026: Partizan

Career highlights
- Nike Hoop Summit (2026)

Miikka Oliveri Muurinen (born 4 March 2007) is a Finnish college basketball player for the Arkansas Razorbacks of the Southeastern Conference (SEC). Nicknamed "Slim Jesus", he stands at 2.13 metres (7 ft 0 in) tall with an estimated wingspan of 2.20 metres (7 ft 3 in).

== Youth career ==
Muurinen came through the youth program of Beat Basket in Järvenpää, Finland. When he was nine, he also played in a youth team of NMKY Helsinki. At the age of 15, he moved to Spain and joined Zentro Basket Madrid.

For the 2023–24 season, Muurinen moved to the United States to attend Sunrise Christian Academy. In March 2024, he competed in the Euroleague Next Generation tournament in Dubai, representing the Next Generation Select Team, averaging 7 points, 5 rebounds and one block per game.

On 20 June 2024, it was announced that Muurinen would join the Arizona Compass Prep program for the upcoming season. On 22 July, Muurinen played for Bradley Beal Elite and won the Nike EYBL Peach Jam tournament, scoring 21 points in the final.

=== Recruiting ===
Muurinen is a consensus five-star recruit and one of the top players in the 2026 class, according to major recruiting services. Muurinen received several offers, including offers from Duke, Arkansas, Kentucky, North Carolina, UCLA, and Indiana.

On 27 April 2026, Muurinen committed to play college basketball at Arkansas for John Calipari.

College recruiting
Name	Hometown	School	Height	Weight	Commit date
Miikka Muurinen; PF	Järvenpää, Finland	AZ Compass Prep (AZ)	6 ft 10 in (2.08 m)	186 lb (84 kg)	
Miikka Muurinen; PF	Recruit ratings: Rivals: 247Sports: ESPN: (93)				
Overall recruit ranking: Rivals: 6 247Sports: 8 ESPN: 8
Note: In many cases, Scout, Rivals, 247Sports, On3, and ESPN may conflict in their listings of height and weight.; In these cases, the average was taken. ESPN grades are on a 100-point scale.; Sources:

== College career ==
Muurinen committed to play college basketball for the Arkansas Razorbacks on 27 April 2026.

== Professional career ==
=== Partizan Belgrade (2025–2026) ===
On 25 September 2025, Muurinen's agent, Teddy Archer, confirmed that the Finnish forward would not be returning to AZ Compass Prep, marking the end of his high school basketball career in the United States. The following day, he was confirmed as a new signing of Partizan Belgrade, a club competing in the EuroLeague and the ABA League. Muurinen signed a three-year deal with the Serbian club. He debuted with his new team in ABA League on 6 October in a win against Krka, recording seven points, two rebounds and assists and one block in 17 minutes. Muurinen left Partizan in late-February 2026, praising his former coach Željko Obradović and stating his interest to continue his career in NCAA.

== International career ==
In August 2023, Muurinen was part of the Finland U16 squad competing in the 2023 FIBA U16 European Championship tournament in Skopje, North Macedonia, where he averaged 16.9 points and 6.1 rebounds per game over seven games.

On 25 June 2024, Muurinen made his debut with the Finland senior national team aged 17, in an Olympic qualifying preparatory friendly game against New Zealand, helping Finland to take a 73–70 win by recording two points, three blocks, an assist and a steal. He made his second appearance for the Finland senior national team on 28 June, in a friendly game against Latvia, which Finland won 90–84. Muurinen was also named in the Finland roster for the 2024 FIBA Olympic qualifying matches against Bahamas, Poland and Spain.

He played for the Finland squad at EuroBasket 2025, as the youngest player in the tournament, where they would reach the semi-finals, ultimately finishing 4th as the best result in Finland's EuroBasket history. At the end of the tournament, Muurinen won the inaugural EuroBasket 2025 Rising Star award, after averaging 6.6 points and 1.9 rebounds per game with multiple highlight reel dunks and blocks.

== Personal life ==
Both his parents are former professional basketball players. His father Kimmo Muurinen played 153 games for the Finland national team, and his mother Jenni Laaksonen played college basketball for North Carolina and represented the Finland women's national team in 68 games. He was also coached by his mother while playing in the youth teams in Järvenpää and Espoo.

== Career statistics ==
Legend
GP	Games played	GS	Games started	MPG	Minutes per game
FG%	Field goal percentage	3P%	3-point field goal percentage	FT%	Free throw percentage
RPG	Rebounds per game	APG	Assists per game	SPG	Steals per game
BPG	Blocks per game	PPG	Points per game	**Bold**	Career high

=== EuroLeague ===
Year	Team	GP	GS	MPG	FG%	3P%	FT%	RPG	APG	SPG	BPG	PPG	PIR
2025–26	Partizan	6	0	1.5	.000	.000	.500	.0	.0	.0	.0	0.2	0.0

=== National team ===
Team	Tournament	Pos.	GP	PPG	RPG	APG
Finland	EuroBasket 2025	4th	9	6.6	1.9	0.0
