= Kenan Kamenjaš =

Bosnian basketball player

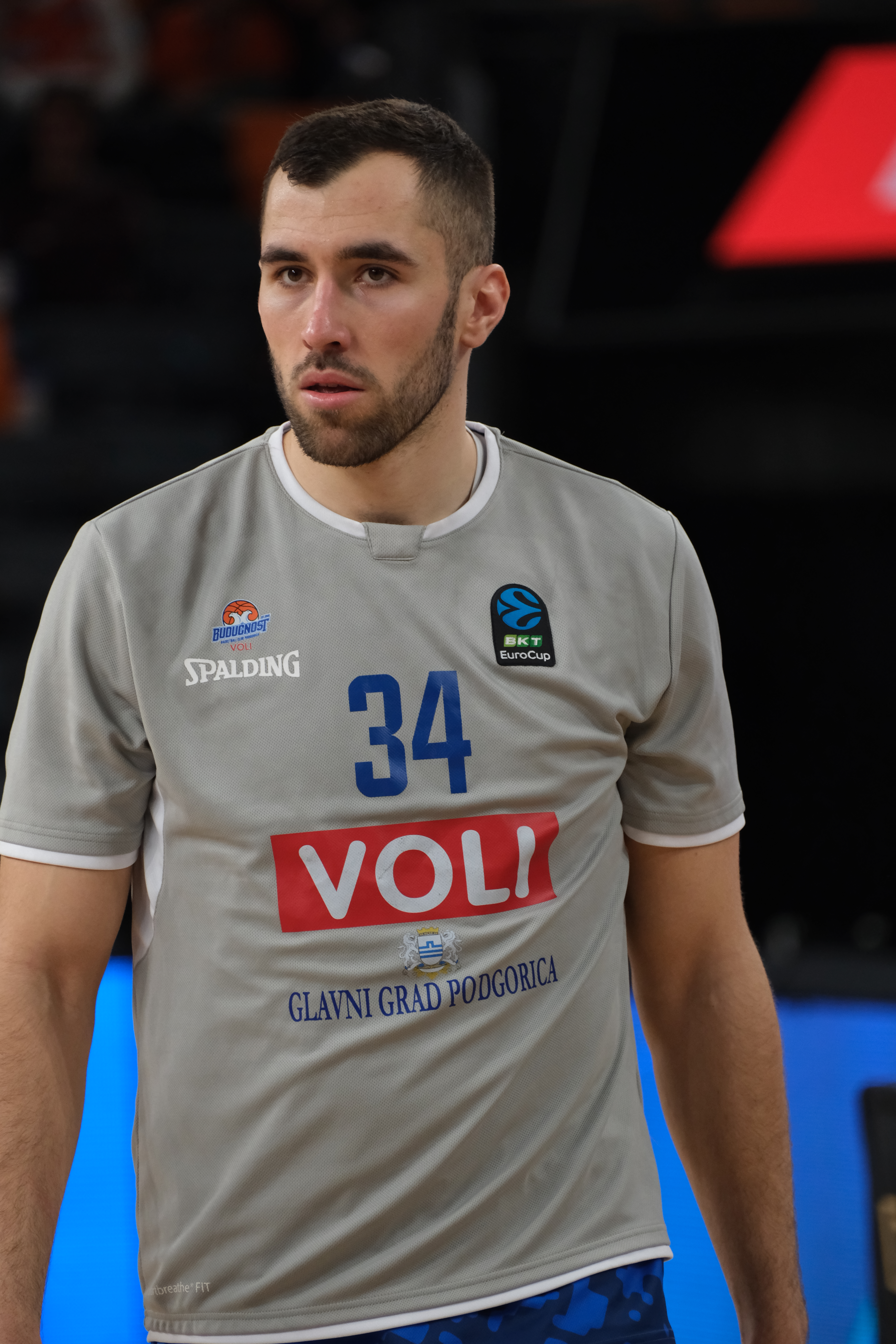
- Kamenjaš with Budućnost VOLI in 2025

No. 34 – Baskonia
- Position: Center
- League: Liga ACB; EuroLeague

Personal information
- Born: January 17, 2000 (age 26) Vareš, Bosnia and Herzegovina
- Listed height: 2.07 m (6 ft 9 in)
- Listed weight: 103 kg (227 lb)

Career information
- NBA draft: 2022: undrafted
- Playing career: 2017–present

Career history
- 2017–2021: Spars Sarajevo
- 2021–2023: Studentski centar
- 2023–2025: Budućnost
- 2025–present: Dubai Basketball
- 2026–present: →Baskonia

Career highlights
- Montenegrin League champion (2023); Bosnian cup winner (2020); 2× Montenegrin Cup winner (2023, 2025); ABA League Supercup winner (2023); 2× ABA League Ideal Starting Five (2022, 2024); 3× ABA League rebounding leader (2022, 2024, 2025); ABA League 2 MVP (2021); ABA League Supercup MVP (2023); ABA League 2 rebounding leader (2021)

Kenan Kamenjaš (born January 17, 2000) is a Bosnian professional basketball player for Baskonia of the Liga ACB and the EuroLeague, on loan from Dubai Basketball. He is a 2.07 m tall center. He also represents the Bosnia and Herzegovina national team internationally.

== Professional career ==
=== Studentski centar (2021–2023) ===
On July 7, 2021, Kamenjaš officially moved to ABA League club Studentski centar on a four-year contract. On April 25, 2022, Kamenjaš was selected for 2022 ABA League Ideal Starting Five.

=== Budućnost (2023–2025) ===
In December 2023, Kenan Kamenjaš returned to Budućnost after spending a season with Studentski centar, where he was named MVP of the ABA League Super Cup and delivered consistent performances, including near double-double averages. In the 2022–23 season, he had a more limited role with Budućnost, averaging 3.6 points and 3.1 rebounds per game in the EuroCup. However, in the following EuroCup season, he significantly improved his performance, averaging 10.3 points and 6.0 rebounds per game.

=== Dubai Basketball (2025–present) ===
On July 12, 2025, he signed with Dubai Basketball of the ABA League.

==== Loan to Baskonia (2026–present) ====
On 11 November 2026, Kamenjaš was loaned to Baskonia of the Spanish Liga ACB and the EuroLeague until the end of the season.

== Career statistics ==
Legend
GP	Games played	GS	Games started	MPG	Minutes per game
FG%	Field goal percentage	3P%	3-point field goal percentage	FT%	Free throw percentage
RPG	Rebounds per game	APG	Assists per game	SPG	Steals per game
BPG	Blocks per game	PPG	Points per game	**Bold**	Career high
*	Led the league

=== Adriatic League ===
Year	Team	GP	GS	MPG	FG%	3P%	FT%	RPG	APG	SPG	BPG	PPG
2021–22	Studentski centar	26*	16	27.6	.632	.143	.586	8.4*	2.0	1.1	0.2	14.3

== Awards ==
Kamenjaš is 3-time ABA League Ideal Starting Five line-up selected; seasons 2021-22, 2023-24 and 2024-25.
