= Andrzej Pluta Jr. =

Polish basketball player (born 2000)

- Pluta with Girona in 2026

No. 21 – Bàsquet Girona
- Position: Point guard
- League: Liga ACB

Personal information
- Born: 3 June 2000 (age 26) Ruda Śląska, Poland
- Listed height: 1.90 m (6 ft 3 in)
- Listed weight: 83 kg (183 lb)

Career information
- NBA draft: 2022: undrafted
- Playing career: 2016–present

Career history
- 2016–2018: Real Betis
- 2018–2020: →Ourense
- 2020–2021: Anwil Włocławek
- 2021–2022: Astoria Bydgoszcz
- 2022–2023: Trefl Sopot
- 2023–2024: Arka Gdynia
- 2024–2026: Legia Warsaw
- 2026–present: Bàsquet Girona

Career highlights
- PLK Finals MVP (2025); PLK Most Valuable Player (2026); PLK Best Polish Player (2026); All-PLK Team (2026); 2× PLK champion (2025, 2026)

Andrzej Mateusz Pluta Jr. (born 3 June 2000) is a Polish professional basketball player for Bàsquet Girona of the Liga ACB. He plays at the point guard position.

== Professional career ==
When 16 years old, he signed a long-term contract with Spanish club Real Betis. During his time there, he was loaned out to Ourense. In 2020, he returned to his homeland and has played there since.

On 10 June 2024, Pluta Jr. signed with Legia Warsaw of the Polish Basketball League (PLK).

On 23 June 2026, Pluta Jr. signed a two-season contract with Bàsquet Girona of the Liga ACB.

== National team career ==
Pluta Jr. played for Polish U16 and U18 teams in FIBA European Championships. Since 2023, he has been a member of the senior Poland national team. In the game against Slovenia during the EuroBasket 2025, he scored 15 points, thanks to which Poland won 105–95.

== Personal life ==
He is the son of the former Poland national team player and a current coach Andrzej Pluta.
