= Manu Lecomte =

Belgian basketball player (born 1995)

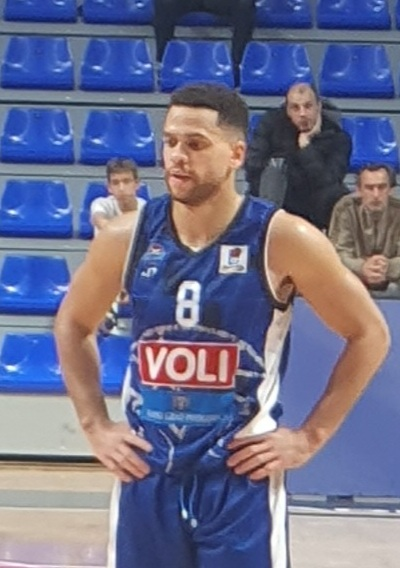
- Lecomte with Budućnost in 2023.

No. 20 – Anwil Włocławek
- Position: Point guard / shooting guard
- League: PLK

Personal information
- Born: 16 August 1995 (age 31) Brussels, Belgium
- Listed height: 5 ft 11 in (1.80 m)
- Listed weight: 175 lb (79 kg)

Career information
- College: Miami (Florida) (2013–2015); Baylor (2016–2018)
- NBA draft: 2018: undrafted
- Playing career: 2018–present

Career history
- 2018–2019: Agua Caliente Clippers
- 2019–2020: UCAM Murcia
- 2020: Gran Canaria
- 2020–2021: Skyliners Frankfurt
- 2021: Élan Béarnais
- 2021: CBet Prienai
- 2021–2022: CBet Jonava
- 2022–2023: Hapoel Eilat
- 2023: Budućnost VOLI
- 2023–2024: Liège Basket
- 2024–2025: Start Lublin
- 2025–2026: CS Vâlcea 1924
- 2026–present: Anwil Włocławek

Career highlights
- Montenegrin League champion (2023); Montenegrin Cup winner (2023); Second-team All-Big 12 (2018); Third-team All-Big 12 (2017); Big 12 Newcomer of the Year (2017)

Emmanuel "Manu" Lecomte (born 16 August 1995) is a Belgian basketball player for Anwil Włocławek of the Polish Basketball League (PLK). He played college basketball for the Baylor Bears and Miami Hurricanes and for the Belgian national team.

== Career ==
=== College ===
He played two years at Miami, before transferring to Baylor. He scored 7.7 points and dished out 2.3 assists per game while shooting 42.5 percent from the field as a sophomore. However, he saw his minutes fall playing alongside Ángel Rodríguez.

As a senior at Baylor, Lecomte averaged 16.2 points per game and was named to the Second-team All-Big 12.

=== Professional ===
He went undrafted in the 2018 NBA draft but signed with the Dallas Mavericks in the NBA Summer League.

He joined the Agua Caliente Clippers of the NBA G League for the 2018–19 season after being selected 20th overall in the G League draft.

On 28 March 2019 he signed with Liga ACB team UCAM Murcia. Lecomte joined Gran Canaria in February 2020, averaging 5.4 points and 1.0 assist per game. On October 13, he signed with Fraport Skyliners of the Basketball Bundesliga.

On 27 January 2021 he signed with Élan Béarnais of the French LNB Pro A. On 2 March 2021 he signed with BC Prienai of the Lithuanian Basketball League. Lecomte averaged 14.9 points, 5.1 assists and 2.1 rebounds per game. On September 16, he signed with BC Jonava.

On 12 November 2022 he signed with Hapoel Eilat of the Israeli Basketball Premier League.

On 6 February 2023 he signed with Budućnost VOLI of the ABA League and EuroCup.

On 6 September 2023 hé signed with Liège Basket of the BNXT League.

On 30 July 2024 he signed with Start Lublin of the Polish Basketball League (PLK).

On July 14, 2026, he signed with Anwil Włocławek of the Polish Basketball League (PLK).

=== International career ===
Playing for Belgium, Lecomte participated at the EuroBasket 2017.

== Personal life ==
Born in Belgium, Lecomte is of Cameroonian descent through his mother.

== College statistics ==
SEASON AVERAGES
SEASON	TEAM	MIN	FGM-FGA	FG%	3PM-3PA	3P%	FTM-FTA	FT%	REB	AST	BLK	STL	PF	TO	PTS
2017-18	BAY	34.1	4.9-12.2	.402	2.8-7.2	.381	3.7-4.1	.890	2.2	3.7	0.0	0.7	1.8	2.2	16.2
2016-17	BAY	30.1	3.9-9.2	.426	2.2-5.3	.408	2.2-2.7	.830	1.8	3.8	0.1	0.8	1.9	2.0	12.2
2014-15	MIA	22.4	2.4-5.6	.430	1.4-3.0	.456	1.7-1.9	.877	1.4	1.8	0.0	0.5	1.5	1.1	7.9
2013-14	MIA	28.0	2.6-6.1	.425	0.8-2.1	.397	1.7-2.2	.778	2.1	2.3	0.0	0.6	1.9	1.8	7.7
