= Mārtiņš Kozlovskis =

Latvian basketball referee (born 1986)

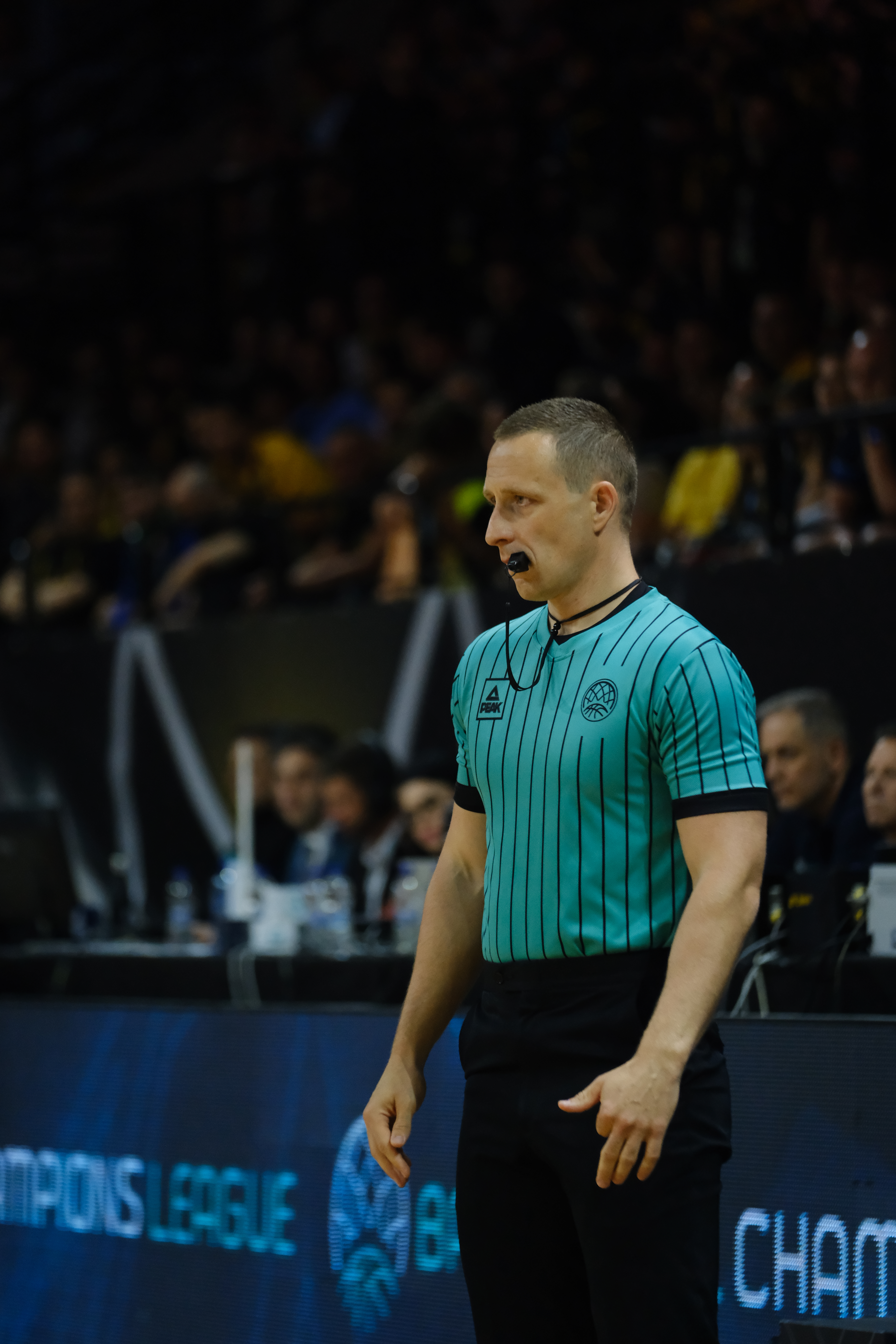
- Kozlovskis in the FIBA BCL held in Athens (2025)

Personal information
- Born: September 9, 1986 (age 40) Riga

Mārtiņš Kozlovskis (Riga, 9 September 1986) is a Latvian international basketball referee, licensed by FIBA since 2007, who has officiated at the Olympic Games, the World Cup, EuroBasket, and top-level European competitions.

== Career ==
Kozlovskis began refereeing in Latvia in the late 1990s and became a FIBA-licensed official in 2007. He has since developed into one of the leading referees from the Baltic region.

He was named among the referees for the Tokyo 2020 Olympic Basketball Tournament (played in 2021).

Kozlovskis officiated at both the 2019 FIBA Basketball World Cup and the 2023 FIBA Basketball World Cup, where he refereed games in the preliminary and knockout rounds.

He has also been appointed to major European competitions, including the EuroBasket 2022 tournament and the upcoming EuroBasket 2025.

Beyond international tournaments, Kozlovskis has refereed in European club competitions such as the Basketball Champions League and the FIBA Europe Cup.

== Recognition ==
In 2021, Kozlovskis was honored as the "Basketball Referee of the Year" by the Latvian Basketball Association.
