= Sandro Mamukelashvili =

Georgian-American basketball player (born 1999)

Sandro Mamukelashvili სანდრო მამუკელაშვილი
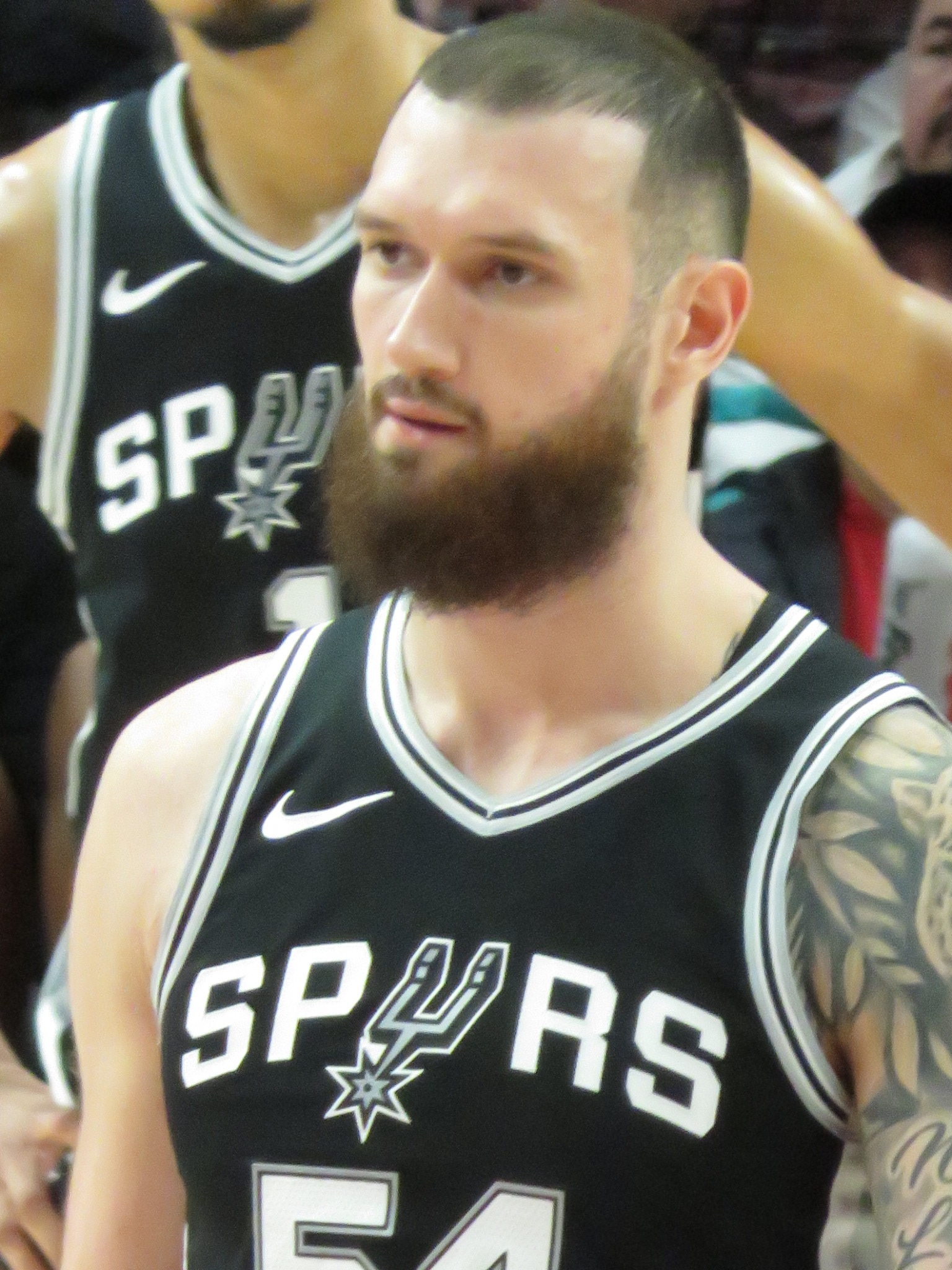
- Mamukelashvili with the San Antonio Spurs in 2024

No. 54 – Los Angeles Lakers
- Position: Power forward / center
- League: NBA

Personal information
- Born: May 23, 1999 (age 27) New York City, New York, U.S.
- Listed height: 6 ft 10 in (2.08 m)
- Listed weight: 240 lb (109 kg)

Career information
- High school: Montverde Academy (Montverde, Florida)
- College: Seton Hall (2017–2021)
- NBA draft: 2021: 2nd round, 54th overall pick
- Drafted by: Indiana Pacers
- Playing career: 2021–present

Career history
- 2021–2023: Milwaukee Bucks
- 2021–2023: →Wisconsin Herd
- 2023–2025: San Antonio Spurs
- 2023: →Austin Spurs
- 2025–2026: Toronto Raptors
- 2026–present: Los Angeles Lakers

Career highlights
- NBA G League Next Up Game (2023); Big East co-Player of the Year (2021); First-team All-Big East (2021); Haggerty Award (2021)
- Stats at NBA.com
- Stats at Basketball Reference

Alexander "Sandro" Mamukelashvili (Georgian: ალექსანდრე "სანდრო" მამუკელაშვილი; born 23 May 1999) is a Georgian-American professional basketball player for the Los Angeles Lakers of the National Basketball Association (NBA). He played college basketball for the Seton Hall Pirates.

Mamukelashvili attended Montverde Academy after a stint on a youth team in Biella, Italy. As a junior at Seton Hall, Mamukelashvili missed several weeks with a wrist injury but averaged 11.9 points per game. He was named Big East co-Player of the Year as a senior.

== Early life ==
Mamukelashvili was born in New York City and grew up in Tbilisi, Georgia after his family moved to Tbilisi when he was a baby. He is fluent in English, Georgian, Russian, and Italian. His grandmother, Ira Gabashvili, was a member of the Soviet women's national basketball team. Mamukelashvili's older brother David introduced him to basketball at a young age, and Sandro grew up idolizing the Georgian player Zaza Pachulia. David currently teaches English and philosophy at Newark Academy in Livingston, New Jersey. He was in Chicago visiting his aunt, pianist Eteri Andjaparidze, when the Russo-Georgian War broke out in August 2008.

When he was 14 years old, Mamukelashvili moved to Biella, Italy to attend high school. He competed on the U17, U18, and U19 teams, and he helped the teams to finish third place in the national finals. Mamukelashvili said that moving to Italy was difficult but his club and head coach Federico Danna made everything possible for him. In 2016, he moved to the United States to attend Montverde Academy, where he played alongside Toronto Raptors player RJ Barrett. While at Montverde, Pachulia became a mentor to Mamukelashvili and introduced him to several players such as Stephen Curry. Mamukelashvili scored 11 points in a 72–45 win over Greensboro Day School to help Montverde reach the finals of the Dick's Sporting Goods High School Nationals.

On April 20, 2017, Mamukelashvili committed to playing college basketball for Seton Hall over offers from USC, South Carolina, and Vanderbilt. He chose the Pirates because his high school coach Kevin Boyle had a good relationship with Seton Hall coach Kevin Willard and his brother David lived nearby.

== College career ==
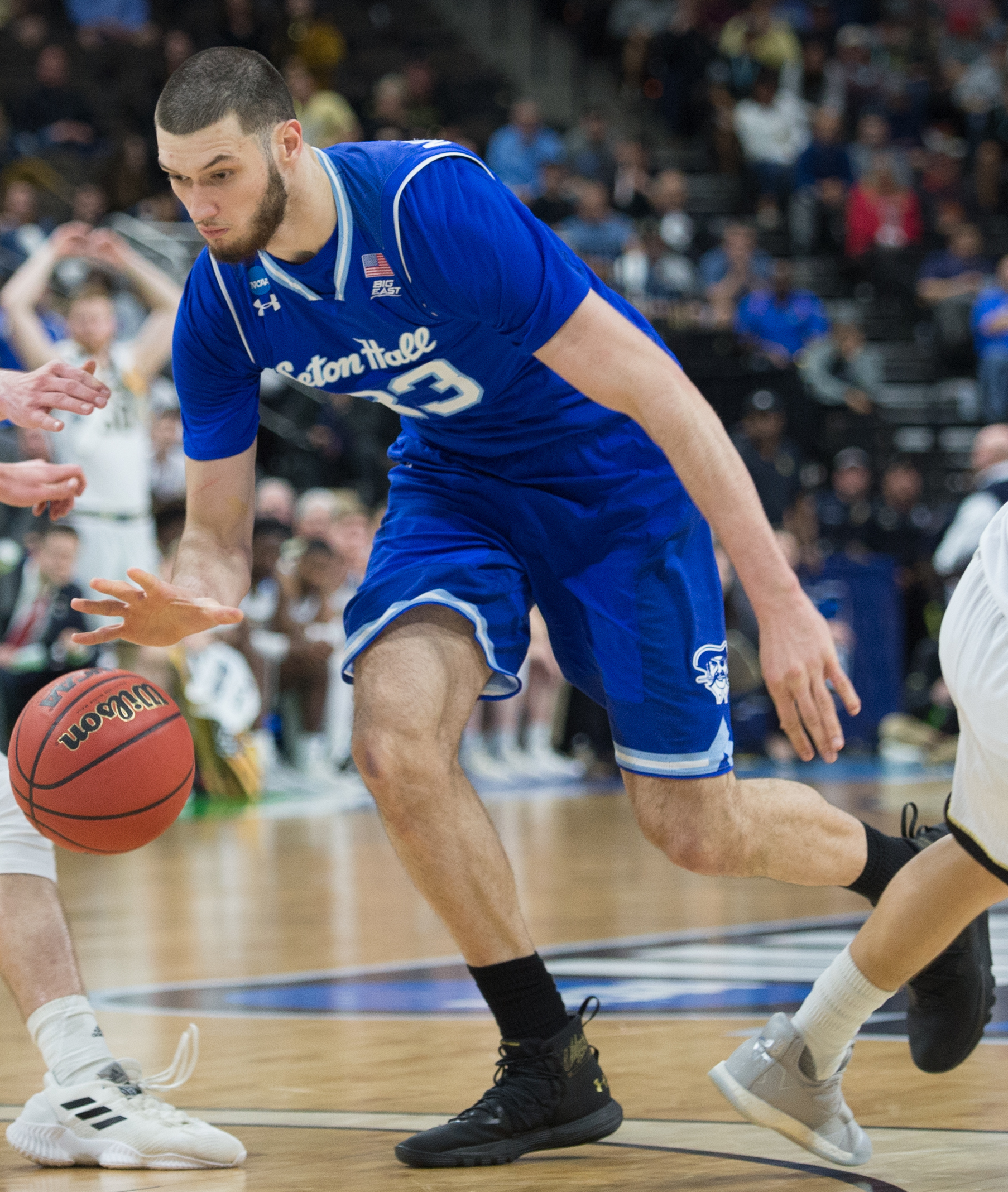
Mamukelashvili with Seton Hall in 2019

As a freshman, Mamukelashvili averaged 2.6 points, 1.9 rebounds and 0.5 blocks per game and helped the Pirates reach the second round of the NCAA Tournament. His best game as a freshman came against Xavier on February 14, 2018, when he scored 17 points and grabbed seven rebounds. As a sophomore, he averaged 8.9 points and 7.8 rebounds per game. On December 19, Mamukelashvili scored a season-high 23 points on 8-of-11 shooting and had eight rebounds in a 90–76 win over Sacred Heart. Following his sophomore season, Mamukelashvili worked with Pachulia at his Academy in Tbilisi to expand his game, adding a jump stop and improving his three-point shooting.

On November 29, 2019, Mamukelashvili scored 18 points on 7-of-10 shooting and had six rebounds in an 84–76 win over Iowa State in the Bahamas. During the Battle 4 Atlantis tournament, Mamukelashvili averaged 14 points, 5.7 rebounds and 2 assists per game while making 61 percent of his shots from the field and 60 percent from behind the arc. He fractured his right wrist in a game against Iowa State on December 8 and missed several weeks. On January 29, 2020, he returned to the court, playing five minutes in a 64–57 win over DePaul. On February 19, with his father Zurab in attendance for the first time in two years, Mamukelashvili scored 15 points and had six rebounds, hitting the game-winning shot on an inbounds pass with 0.6 seconds remaining in a 74–72 win over Butler. He had a season-high 26 points on February 29, in an 88–79 win over Marquette. Mamukelashvili averaged 11.9 points and 6 rebounds per game as a junior. After the season, he declared for the 2020 NBA draft but did not hire an agent, signaling high potential to return to Seton Hall for his senior campaign. After receiving second round interest, Mamukelashvili announced on August 1 that he was withdrawing from the draft and returning for his senior season.

Coming into his senior season, Mamukelashvili was named to the Preseason First Team All-Big East, and he was expected to help replace the graduated Myles Powell. On December 11, 2020, he scored a career-high 32 points and had nine rebounds and three assists in a 77–68 victory against St. John's. On February 16, 2021, Mamukelashvili scored his 1,000th career point in a 60–52 win against DePaul and finished with 25 points, 11 rebounds and four assists. He averaged 17.5 points, 7.6 rebounds and 3.2 assists per game. At the close of the season, he was named the Big East co-Player of the Year (alongside Collin Gillespie and Jeremiah Robinson-Earl) and won the Haggerty Award as the best player in the New York metropolitan area. Mamukelashvili was also named Associated Press All-America honorable mention and was a finalist for the Karl Malone Award.

== Professional career ==
=== Milwaukee Bucks (2021–2023) ===
Mamukelashvili was selected in the second round of the 2021 NBA draft with the 54th pick by the Indiana Pacers. He was then traded to the Milwaukee Bucks along with the draft rights of Georgios Kalaitzakis, the 60th pick, and two future second round picks in exchange for the draft rights of the 31st pick, Isaiah Todd. On August 4, 2021, the Bucks signed him to a two-way contract. Under the terms of the deal he would split time between the Bucks and their NBA G League affiliate, the Wisconsin Herd. On October 19, 2021, Mamukelashvili had his debut in the NBA, coming off the bench with an assist and a rebound in a 127–104 win over the Brooklyn Nets. On October 26, he was assigned to the Wisconsin Herd. On November 29, while playing with the Herd, Mamukelashvili posted 28 points, six rebounds, three assists, three blocks, and one steal in a win against the Windy City Bulls. He missed two games with an illness in December 2021.

Mamukelashvili joined the Bucks' 2022 NBA Summer League roster. On July 18, 2022, Mamukelashvili was named to the All-NBA Summer League First Team.

On March 1, 2023, Mamukelashvili was waived by the Bucks.

=== San Antonio Spurs (2023–2025) ===
On March 3, 2023, the San Antonio Spurs claimed Mamukelashvili off of waivers and converted his deal to a standard NBA contract. On July 27, he re-signed with the Spurs.

On July 22, 2024, Mamukelashvili re-signed with the Spurs. On March 19, 2025, Mamukelashvili scored a career-high 34 points with nine rebounds, three assists and a steal in 19 minutes of action off the bench in a 120–105 win over the New York Knicks. This also broke the record for the most points in a game playing less than 20 minutes.

=== Toronto Raptors (2025–2026) ===
On July 4, 2025, Mamukelashvili signed a two-year, $5.5 million contract with the Toronto Raptors. He played a sixth man role for the team, appearing in 80 games for an average 21.9 minutes in the 2025–26 season. Mamukelashvili averaged 11.2 points per game on 52.3% field goal shooting, both career-highs, along with 38.9% shooting from three-point range, 4.9 rebounds and 1.9 assists per game. He saw his first playoff appearance with the Raptors in their first round series defeat to the Cleveland Cavaliers, averaging five points, five rebounds and one assist across seven games.

On June 29, 2026, Mamukelashvili declined his $2.8 million player option for the 2026–27 season, making him a free agent.

=== Los Angeles Lakers (2026–present) ===
On July 7, 2026, Mamukelashvili signed a four-year, $52 million contract with the Los Angeles Lakers. He made his Lakers debut on October 21, recording five points, four rebounds, two assists and two steals in a 127–105 win over the Golden State Warriors.

== National team career ==
In July 2018, Mamukelashvili represented the Georgia national basketball team at the 2019 FIBA World Cup Qualifications and the Georgia U20 team at the FIBA U20 European Championship. During the European Championship, he averaged 8.7 points, 7.0 rebounds, and 1.7 assists per game.

== Career statistics ==
Legend
GP	Games played	GS	Games started	MPG	Minutes per game
FG%	Field goal percentage	3P%	3-point field goal percentage	FT%	Free throw percentage
RPG	Rebounds per game	APG	Assists per game	SPG	Steals per game
BPG	Blocks per game	PPG	Points per game	**Bold**	Career high

=== NBA ===
==== Regular season ====
Year	Team	GP	GS	MPG	FG%	3P%	FT%	RPG	APG	SPG	BPG	PPG
2021–22	Milwaukee	41	3	9.9	.496	**.423**	**.818**	2.0	.5	.2	.2	3.8
2022–23	Milwaukee	24	0	9.0	.328	.219	.667	2.3	.7	.2	.2	2.4
2022–23	San Antonio	19	7	**23.3**	.453	.343	.692	**6.8**	**2.4**	.5	.4	10.8
2023–24	San Antonio	46	5	9.8	.471	.297	.735	3.2	1.1	.2	.3	4.1
2024–25	San Antonio	61	0	11.2	.502	.373	.741	3.1	.8	.4	.3	6.3
2025–26	Toronto	**80**	**13**	21.9	**.523**	.389	.747	4.9	1.9	**.8**	**.5**	**11.2**
Career		271	28	14.6	.494	.366	.739	3.7	1.2	.4	.3	7.0

==== Playoffs ====
Year	Team	GP	GS	MPG	FG%	3P%	FT%	RPG	APG	SPG	BPG	PPG
2026	Toronto	7	0	14.9	.400	.286	.429	5.0	1.0	.7	.4	5.0
Career		7	0	14.9	.400	.286	.429	5.0	1.0	.7	.4	5.0

=== College ===
Year	Team	GP	GS	MPG	FG%	3P%	FT%	RPG	APG	SPG	BPG	PPG
2017–18	Seton Hall	**34**	0	9.6	.471	.296	.600	1.9	.5	.2	.5	2.6
2018–19	Seton Hall	**34**	**34**	29.2	.437	.301	.612	**7.8**	1.6	.6	**1.2**	8.9
2019–20	Seton Hall	20	18	26.1	**.540**	**.434**	.658	6.0	1.4	.5	.6	11.9
2020–21	Seton Hall	27	27	**35.6**	.434	.336	**.714**	7.6	**3.2**	**1.1**	.6	**17.5**
Career		115	79	24.4	.459	.339	.663	5.7	1.6	.6	.7	9.6
