= France men's national basketball team results (2020–present) =

This is a list of the France men's national basketball team results from 2020 to present.

== Results and fixtures ==
Win Loss

=== 2020 ===
21 February 2020 EuroBasket 2022 qualifiers	Germany	83–69	France	Vechta, Germany
20:00 CET (UTC+1)	Scoring by quarter: 15–16, 26–18, 24–20, 18–15
	Pts: Benzing 22; Rebs: Jallow, Zirbes 8 Asts: Akpınar 5	Boxscore	Pts: Michineau 16; Rebs: Fall 8 Asts: three players 2	Arena: RASTA Dome; Attendance: 3,140; Referees: Manuel Mazzoni (ITA), Boris Krejič (SLO), Saša Maričić (SRB)

24 February 2020 EuroBasket 2022 qualifiers	France	85–66	Montenegro	La Roche-sur-Yon, France
18:45 CET (UTC+1)	Scoring by quarter: 18–12, 22–26, 20–16, 25–12
	Pts: Yabusele 15; Rebs: Fall 6 Asts: Julien 7	Boxscore	Pts: Ivanović 24; Rebs: Simonović, Todorović 7 Asts: Popović 3	Arena: Vendéspace; Attendance: 4,073; Referees: Marius Ciulin (ROU), Tomas Jasevičius (LTU), Ventsislav Velikov (BUL)

27 November 2020 EuroBasket 2022 qualifiers	Great Britain	56–79	France	Pau, France* (Note: Due to the COVID-19 pandemic, all matches in the November 2020 and February 2021 windows were played behind closed doors in select host cities.)
18:00 CET (UTC+1)	Scoring by quarter: 5–24, 15–22, 17–16, 19–17
	Pts: Hamilton 12; Rebs: Clark, Olaseni 6 Asts: Clark 4	Boxscore	Pts: M'Baye 24; Rebs: Cordinier 9 Asts: Albicy 9	Arena: Palais des Sports de Pau; Referees: Oskars Lūcis (LAT), Lorenzo Baldini (ITA), Kerem Baki (TUR)

29 November 2020 EuroBasket 2022 qualifiers	France	86–74	Germany	Pau, France*
15:00 CET (UTC+1)	Scoring by quarter: 25–22, 17–19, 19–18, 25–15
	Pts: Ouattara 24; Rebs: Bouteille, M'Baye 5 Asts: Albicy 7	Boxscore	Pts: Obst 16; Rebs: Jallow 5 Asts: Akpınar 4	Arena: Palais des Sports de Pau; Referees: Oskars Lūcis (LAT), Lorenzo Baldini (ITA), Gatis Saliņš (LAT)

=== 2021 ===
20 February 2021 EuroBasket 2022 qualifiers	Montenegro	71–73	France	Podgorica, Montenegro*
20:45 CET (UTC+1)	Scoring by quarter: 17–13, 20–18, 16–19, 18–23
	Pts: Popović 17; Rebs: Simonović 7 Asts: Ivanović 4	Boxscore	Pts: Heurtel 16; Rebs: Chassang, M'Baye 7 Asts: Albicy, Heurtel 4	Arena: Bemax Arena; Referees: Antonio Conde (ESP), Fernando Calatrava (ESP), Martin Horozov (BUL)

22 February 2021 EuroBasket 2022 qualifiers	France	73–94	Great Britain	Podgorica, Montenegro*
17:00 CET (UTC+1)	Scoring by quarter: 16–26, 19–26, 20–21, 18–21
	Pts: Lessort 15; Rebs: Cordinier, Lessort 6 Asts: Heurtel 8	Boxscore	Pts: Soko 27; Rebs: Hesson, Soko 7 Asts: Nelson 6	Arena: Bemax Arena; Referees: Fernando Calatrava (ESP), Tanel Suslov (EST), Can Mavisu (TUR)

8 July 2021 Friendly	Spain	86–77	France	Málaga, Spain
19:30 CEST (UTC+2)	Scoring by quarter: 21–24, 23–14, 21–20, 21–19
	Pts: Rubio 16; Rebs: M. Gasol 6 Asts: M. Gasol 5	Boxscore	Pts: Fournier 20; Rebs: Poirier 6 Asts: De Colo 7	Arena: Palacio Martín Carpena

10 July 2021 Friendly	France	79–87	Spain	Paris, France
20:30 CEST (UTC+2)	Scoring by quarter: 20–23, 16–22, 21–14, 22–28
	Pts: Fournier 15; Rebs: Yabusele 10; Asts: De Colo 4	Boxscore	Pts: Rubio 23; Rebs: W. Hernangómez 5 Asts: López-Arostegui, Rodríguez 4	Arena: Accor Arena

18 July 2021 Friendly	Japan	81–75	France	Saitama, Japan
13:30 (UTC+9)	Scoring by quarter: 18–14, 28–16, 15–28, 20–17
	Pts: Hachimura 19; Rebs: Watanabe 9 Asts: Tanaka 4	Boxscore	Pts: Fournier 16; Rebs: Gobert 8 Asts: Batum 5	Arena: Saiden Chemical Arena

25 July 2021 2020 Summer Olympics Group stage	France	83–76	United States	Saitama, Japan
21:00 (UTC+9)	Scoring by quarter: 15–22, 22–23, 25–11, 21–20
	Pts: Fournier 28; Rebs: Gobert 9 Asts: Batum, De Colo 5	Boxscore	Pts: Holiday 18; Rebs: Adebayo 10; Asts: Green, Holiday 4	Arena: Saitama Super Arena; Referees: Guilherme Locatelli (BRA), Michael Weiland (CAN), Manuel Mazzoni (ITA)

28 July 2021 2020 Summer Olympics Group stage	Czech Republic	77–97	France	Saitama, Japan
21:00 (UTC+9)	Scoring by quarter: 28–22, 12–29, 16–26, 21–20
	Pts: Veselý 19; Rebs: Balvín 8 Asts: Satoranský 9	Boxscore	Pts: Fournier 21; Rebs: Gobert 10; Asts: De Colo 8	Arena: Saitama Super Arena; Referees: Juan Fernández (ARG), Manuel Mazzoni (ITA), Leandro Lezcano (ARG)

31 July 2021 2020 Summer Olympics Group stage	Iran	62–79	France	Saitama, Japan
10:00 (UTC+9)	Scoring by quarter: 17–22, 10–24, 20–16, 15–17
	Pts: Haddadi 18; Rebs: Haddadi 12; Asts: Haddadi 5	Boxscore	Pts: Heurtel 16; Rebs: four players 5 Asts: De Colo 5	Arena: Saitama Super Arena; Referees: Guilherme Locatelli (BRA), Leandro Lezcano (ARG), Rabah Noujaim (LBN)

3 August 2021 2020 Summer Olympics Quarter-finals	Italy	75–84	France	Saitama, Japan
17:20 (UTC+9)	Scoring by quarter: 25–20, 17–23, 12–21, 21–20
	Pts: Fontecchio 23; Rebs: Gallinari 10; Asts: Pajola 6	Boxscore	Pts: Gobert 22; Rebs: Batum 14; Asts: De Colo 7	Arena: Saitama Super Arena; Referees: Roberto Vázquez (PUR), Juan Fernández (ARG), Steven Anderson (USA)

5 August 2021 2020 Summer Olympics Semi-finals	France	90–89	Slovenia	Saitama, Japan
20:00 (UTC+9)	Scoring by quarter: 27–29, 15–15, 29–21, 19–24
	Pts: De Colo 25; Rebs: Gobert 16; Asts: De Colo 5	Boxscore	Pts: Tobey 23; Rebs: Dončić 10; Asts: Dončić 18	Arena: Saitama Super Arena; Referees: Guilherme Locatelli (BRA), Juan Fernández (ARG), Mārtiņš Kozlovskis (LAT)

7 August 2021 2020 Summer Olympics Gold medal game	France	82–87	United States	Saitama, Japan
11:30 (UTC+9)	Scoring by quarter: 18–22, 21–22, 24–27, 19–16
	Pts: Fournier, Gobert 16; Rebs: Gobert 8 Asts: De Colo 7	Boxscore	Pts: Durant 29; Rebs: Tatum 7 Asts: Green 5	Arena: Saitama Super Arena; Referees: Guilherme Locatelli (BRA), Ademir Zurapović (BIH), Michael Weiland (CAN)

26 November 2021 2023 FIBA World Cup qualifiers – 1st round	France	73–67	Montenegro	Pau
20:30	Scoring by quarter: 13–22, 25–16, 11–18, 24–11
	Pts: Labeyrie 18; Rebs: Cordinier 8 Asts: Cordinier, Lacombe 4	Boxscore	Pts: Mihailović 23; Rebs: Radović 8 Asts: Cobbs 7	Arena: Palais des Sports de Pau; Attendance: 5,376; Referees: Martin Horozov (BUL), Kerem Baki (TUR), Lorenzo Baldini (ITA)
Note:

29 November 2021 2023 FIBA World Cup qualifiers – 1st round	Hungary	54–78	France	Kaposvár
18:00	Scoring by quarter: 8–21, 21–24, 9–18, 16–15
	Pts: Benke 14; Rebs: three players 4 Asts: Váradi 4	Boxscore	Pts: Labeyrie 19; Rebs: Labeyrie, Tarpey 6 Asts: Cordinier 7	Arena: Kaposvár Aréna; Attendance: 1,500; Referees: Marius Ciulin (ROU), Sergii Zashchuk (UKR), Ventsislav Velikov (BUL)

=== 2022 ===
24 February 2022 2023 FIBA World Cup qualifiers – 1st round	France	94–56	Portugal	Dijon
19:00	Scoring by quarter: 15–17, 22–16, 27–11, 30–12
	Pts: Labeyrie 15; Rebs: Tarpey 10; Asts: Cordinier 7	Boxscore	Pts: Brito 15; Rebs: Queiroz 4 Asts: Brito, Ventura 4	Arena: Palais des Sports de Dijon; Attendance: 4,000; Referees: Aleksandar Glišić (SRB), Viola Györgyi (NOR), Geert Jacobs (BEL)
Note:

27 February 2022 2023 FIBA World Cup qualifiers – 1st round	Portugal	56–69	France	Matosinhos
17:00	Scoring by quarter: 16–17, 19–17, 8–15, 13–20
	Pts: Lisboa 14; Rebs: Borovnjak 7 Asts: Barbosa 5	Boxscore	Pts: M'Baye 16; Rebs: Lessort, Tarpey 6 Asts: Julien 5	Arena: Centro de Desportos e Congressos de Matosinhos; Attendance: 4,000; Referees: Oskars Lūcis (LAT), Zdenko Tomašovič (SVK), Vladimir Jevtović (SRB)
Note:

1 July 2022 2023 FIBA World Cup qualifiers – 1st round	Montenegro	70–69	France	Podgorica
19:00	Scoring by quarter: 15–15, 18–16, 23–17, 14–21
	Pts: Radović 15; Rebs: Ilić 10; Asts: Ivanović 5	Boxscore	Pts: Poirier 18; Rebs: Poirier 12; Asts: Albicy 4	Arena: Morača Sports Center; Attendance: 4,100; Referees: Manuel Mazzoni (ITA), Georgios Poursanidis (GRE), Fernando Calatrava (ESP)
Note:

4 July 2022 2023 FIBA World Cup qualifiers – 1st round	France	81–40	Hungary	Mouilleron-le-Captif
20:30	Scoring by quarter: 15–11, 24–14, 29–2, 13–13
	Pts: Maledon 15; Rebs: Jaiteh 7 Asts: Lacombe 5	Boxscore	Pts: Perl, Vojvoda 7 Rebs: Golomán 5 Asts: Perl 3	Arena: Vendespace; Attendance: 4,073; Referees: Andris Aunkrogers (LAT), Tanel Suslov (EST), Pavel Fúska (SVK)
Note:

7 August 2022 Friendly	France	89–65	Netherlands	Rouen, France
17:00 CEST (UTC+2)	Scoring by quarter: 25–20, 20–19, 26–12, 18–14
	Pts: Fournier 15; Rebs: Gobert 9 Asts: Okobo 4	Boxscore	Pts: Franke 21; Rebs: Kherrazi 7 Asts: Van der Vuurst de Vries 5	Arena: Kindarena

12 August 2022 Friendly	Italy	77–78(OT)	France	Casalecchio di Reno, Italy
20:30 CEST (UTC+2)	Scoring by quarter: 19–13, 17–23, 14–18, 19–15, Overtime: 8–9
	Pts: Fontecchio 24; Rebs: Melli 7 Asts: Melli 6	Boxscore	Pts: Gobert 15; Rebs: Poirier 9 Asts: Heurtel 4	Arena: Unipol Arena

16 August 2022 Friendly	France	100–68	Italy	Montpellier, France
20:30 CEST (UTC+2)	Scoring by quarter: 25–14, 26–26, 25–15, 24–13
	Pts: Okobo 18; Rebs: Gobert 6 Asts: Heurtel 6	Boxscore	Pts: Melli 13; Rebs: Melli 7 Asts: Baldasso 4	Arena: Sud de France Arena

18 August 2022 Friendly	France	90–71	Belgium	Montpellier, France
20:30 CEST (UTC+2)	Scoring by quarter: 19–24, 25–11, 27–19, 19–17
	Pts: Heurtel 13; Rebs: Poirier 12; Asts: Heurtel 6	Boxscore	Pts: Obasohan 14; Rebs: Bako 7 Asts: three players 3	Arena: Sud de France Arena

24 August 2022 2023 FIBA World Cup qualifiers – 2nd round	France	95–60	Czech Republic	Paris, France
20:30 CEST (UTC+2)	Scoring by quarter: 18–27, 20–15, 28–8, 29–10
	Pts: Luwawu-Cabarrot, Yabusele 16; Rebs: Gobert, Poirier 7 Asts: Heurtel 9	Boxscore	Pts: Hruban 14; Rebs: Balvín, Hruban 7 Asts: Veselý 7	Arena: Accor Arena; Attendance: 14,578; Referees: Boris Krejić (SVN), Gatis Saliņš (LAT), Martin Vulić (CRO)

27 August 2022 2023 FIBA World Cup qualifiers – 2nd round	Bosnia and Herzegovina	96–90(2OT)	France	Sarajevo, Bosnia and Herzegovina
20:00 CEST (UTC+2)	Scoring by quarter: 28–14, 10–32, 21–5, 17–25, Overtime: 7–7, 13–7
	Pts: Nurkić 21; Rebs: Nurkić 9 Asts: Musa 5	Boxscore	Pts: Fournier 24; Rebs: Gobert 14; Asts: Fournier, Tarpey 3	Arena: Mirza Delibašić Hall; Attendance: 6,826; Referees: Manuel Mazzoni (ITA), Wojciech Liszka (POL), Ilias Kounelles (CYP)

1 September 2022 EuroBasket 2022 – Group stage	France	63–76	Germany	Lanxess Arena, Cologne
20:30	Scoring by quarter: 13–17, 18–21, 12–19, 20–19
	Pts: Yabusele 18; Rebs: Gobert 12; Asts: Heurtel 8	Boxscore	Pts: Thiemann 14; Rebs: three players 6 Asts: Lô, Schröder 5	Attendance: 18,017; Referees: Georgios Poursanidis (GRE), Lorenzo Baldini (ITA), Michał Proc (POL)
Note:

3 September 2022 EuroBasket 2022 – Group stage	Lithuania	73–77	France	Lanxess Arena, Cologne
17:45	Scoring by quarter: 25–23, 16–17, 15–10, 17–27
	Pts: Valančiūnas 15; Rebs: Sabonis 9 Asts: Jokubaitis 5	Boxscore	Pts: Fournier 27; Rebs: Fournier, Yabusele 5 Asts: Albicy 4	Attendance: 18,017; Referees: Manuel Mazzoni (ITA), Michał Proc (POL), Mārtiņš Kozlovskis (LAT)
Note:

4 September 2022 EuroBasket 2022 – Group stage	France	78–74	Hungary	Lanxess Arena, Cologne
20:30	Scoring by quarter: 21–17, 21–22, 25–14, 11–21
	Pts: Yabusele 17; Rebs: Gobert 9 Asts: Heurtel 7	Boxscore	Pts: Hanga 18; Rebs: Hanga, Váradi 4 Asts: Perl, Váradi 4	Attendance: 15,724; Referees: Marius Ciulin (ROU), Andris Aunkrogers (LAT), Ivor Matějek (CZE)
Note:

6 September 2022 EuroBasket 2022 – Group stage	Bosnia and Herzegovina	68–81	France	Lanxess Arena, Cologne
14:30	Scoring by quarter: 19–19, 15–25, 16–8, 18–29
	Pts: three players 14; Rebs: Nurkić 10; Asts: Atić 5	Boxscore	Pts: Yabusele 15; Rebs: Gobert 12; Asts: Heurtel 8	Attendance: 11,957; Referees: Marius Ciulin (ROU), Georgios Poursanidis (GRE), Ilias Kounelles (CYP)
Note:

7 September 2022 EuroBasket 2022 – Group stage	France	82–88	Slovenia	Lanxess Arena, Cologne
17:15	Scoring by quarter: 19–20, 21–24, 24–20, 18–24
	Pts: Gobert 19; Rebs: Gobert 8 Asts: Heurtel 10	Boxscore	Pts: Dončić 47; Rebs: Dončić 7 Asts: Dončić 5	Attendance: 13,426; Referees: Aleksandar Glisić (SRB), Marius Ciulin (ROU), Georgios Poursanidis (GRE)
Note:

10 September 2022 EuroBasket 2022 – Round of 16	Turkey	86–87(OT)	France	Mercedes-Benz Arena, Berlin
12:00	Scoring by quarter: 11–18, 24–25, 22–6, 20–28, Overtime: 9–10
	Pts: Tuncer 22; Rebs: Şanlı 7 Asts: Hazer 6	Boxscore	Pts: Gobert 20; Rebs: Gobert 17; Asts: Heurtel 7	Attendance: 9,411; Referees: Antonio Conde (ESP), Boris Krejić (SLO), Martin Horozov (BUL)
Note:

14 September 2022 EuroBasket 2022 – Quarterfinals	France	93–85(OT)	Italy	Mercedes-Benz Arena, Berlin
17:15	Scoring by quarter: 27–20, 11–11, 18–31, 21–15, Overtime: 16–8
	Pts: Heurtel 20; Rebs: Gobert 14; Asts: Heurtel 8	Boxscore	Pts: Fontecchio, Spissu 21; Rebs: Polonara 6 Asts: Melli 7	Attendance: 6,324; Referees: Ademir Zurapović (BIH), Mārtiņš Kozlovskis (LAT), Aleksandar Glišić (SRB)
Note:

16 September 2022 EuroBasket 2022 – Semifinals	Poland	54–95	France	Mercedes-Benz Arena, Berlin
17:15	Scoring by quarter: 9–15, 9–19, 18–30, 18–31
	Pts: Michalak, Slaughter 9 Rebs: Cel 4 Asts: Kolenda, Schenk 3	Boxscore	Pts: Yabusele 22; Rebs: Fall 10; Asts: Heurtel 6	Attendance: 11,563; Referees: Saverio Lanzarini (ITA), Mārtiņš Kozlovskis (LAT), Lorenzo Baldini (ITA)
Note:

18 September 2022 EuroBasket 2022 – Final	Spain	88–76	France	Mercedes-Benz Arena, Berlin
20:30	Scoring by quarter: 23–14, 24–23, 19–20, 22–19
	Pts: J. Hernangómez 27; Rebs: W. Hernangómez 8 Asts: Brown 11	Boxscore	Pts: Fournier 23; Rebs: Tarpey 9 Asts: Heurtel 7	Attendance: 13,042; Referees: Ademir Zurapović (BIH), Boris Krejić (SLO), Mārtiņš Kozlovskis (LAT)
Note:

11 November 2022 2023 FIBA World Cup qualifiers – 2nd round	Lithuania	65–90	France	Panevėžys, Lithuania
19:30 EET (UTC+2)	Scoring by quarter: 14–22, 19–21, 14–27, 18–20
	Pts: Bendžius, Blaževič 14; Rebs: Echodas 8 Asts: Velička 7	Boxscore	Pts: Francisco 21; Rebs: Wembanyama 9 Asts: Albicy, Sene 4	Arena: Cido Arena; Attendance: 4,699; Referees: Martin Horozov (BUL), Gatis Saliņš (LAT), Yener Yılmaz (TUR)

14 November 2022 2023 FIBA World Cup qualifiers – 2nd round	France	92–56	Bosnia and Herzegovina	Pau, France
20:30 CET (UTC+1)	Scoring by quarter: 17–13, 23–14, 19–17, 33–12
	Pts: Wembanyama 19; Rebs: Kamagate 6 Asts: Francisco, Sene 4	Boxscore	Pts: Kamenjaš 20; Rebs: Penava 8 Asts: Gegić 5	Arena: Palais des Sports de Pau; Referees: Georgios Poursanidis (GRE), Lorenzo Baldini (ITA), Andris Aunkrogers (LAT)

=== 2023 ===
23 February 2023 2023 FIBA World Cup qualifiers – 2nd round	Czech Republic	59–72	France	Pardubice, Czech Republic
18:45 CET (UTC+1)	Scoring by quarter: 27–11, 9–16, 11–22, 12–23
	Pts: Kyzlink 23; Rebs: Hruban 7 Asts: Kyzlink 5	Boxscore	Pts: Wembanyama 22; Rebs: Wembanyama 17; Asts: Francisco 8	Arena: Enteria arena Attendance: 4,521; Referees: Saverio Lanzarini (ITA), Oskars Lūcis (LAT), Franko Gracin (CRO)

26 February 2023 2023 FIBA World Cup qualifiers – 2nd round	France	70–63	Lithuania	Trélazé, France
18:00 CET (UTC+1)	Scoring by quarter: 11–14, 24–13, 18–16, 17–20
	Pts: Wembanyama 15; Rebs: Inglis 7 Asts: Inglis 6	Boxscore	Pts: Normantas 17; Rebs: Maldūnas 6 Asts: Kariniauskas 6	Arena: Arena Loire; Attendance: 5,039; Referees: Luis Castillo (ESP), Carsten Straube (GER), Anastasios Kardaris (GRE)

31 July 2023 Friendly	France	93–36	Tunisia	Pau, France
20:30 CEST (UTC+2)	Scoring by quarter: 24–16, 29–12, 22–2, 18–6
	Pts: Yabusele 18; Rebs: Gobert 8 Asts: Okobo 7	Boxscore; Video	Pts: Ochi 8 Rebs: Ochi 4 Asts: Dhif 4	Arena: Palais des Sports de Pau

2 August 2023 Friendly	France	80–69	Montenegro	Montpellier, France
20:30 CEST (UTC+2)	Scoring by quarter: 21–15, 21–22, 18–18, 20–14
	Pts: Fournier 20; Rebs: Gobert 9 Asts: Okobo 7	Boxscore; Video	Pts: Ivanović 12; Rebs: Vučević 11; Asts: Ivanović, Vučević 5	Arena: Sud de France Arena

7 August 2023 Friendly	France	86–67	Venezuela	Orléans, France
20:30 CEST (UTC+2)	Scoring by quarter: 20–11, 23–20, 23–15, 20–21
	Pts: Yabusele 14; Rebs: Gobert 11; Asts: De Colo 6	Boxscore; Video	Pts: Zamora 16; Rebs: Carrera 7 Asts: Sojo, Vargas 3	Arena: CO'Met Arena

9 August 2023 Friendly	France	90–72	Lithuania	Orléans, France
20:30 CEST (UTC+2)	Scoring by quarter: 18–19, 27–14, 26–17, 19–22
	Pts: Yabusele 15; Rebs: Batum, Gobert 6 Asts: De Colo 8	Boxscore; Video	Pts: Kuzminskas 18; Rebs: Kuzminskas 7 Asts: Jokubaitis 4	Arena: CO'Met Arena

11 August 2023 Friendly	Lithuania	70–76	France	Vilnius, Lithuania
19:30 EEST (UTC+3)	Scoring by quarter: 29–25, 10–14, 17–19, 14–18
	Pts: Bendžius 21; Rebs: Valančiūnas 14; Asts: Jokubaitis 10	Boxscore; Video	Pts: Yabusele 19; Rebs: Gobert 8 Asts: Batum 7	Arena: Avia Solutions Group Arena

17 August 2023 Friendly	Japan	70–88	France	Tokyo, Japan
19:00 (UTC+9)	Scoring by quarter: 20–23, 20–22, 17–25, 13–18
	Pts: Tominaga 20; Rebs: Hawkinson 7 Asts: Kawamura 5	Boxscore	Pts: Gobert 16; Rebs: Gobert 9 Asts: Okobo 4	Arena: Ariake Arena

20 August 2023 Friendly	France	74–78	Australia	Tokyo, Japan
13:00 (UTC+9)	Scoring by quarter: 27–19, 12–12, 19–25, 16–22
	Pts: Fournier 29; Rebs: Gobert 8 Asts: De Colo, Yabusele 4	Boxscore	Pts: Giddey, Kay 12; Rebs: Cooks 7 Asts: Giddey 5	Arena: Ariake Arena

25 August 2023 2023 FIBA World Cup – Group stage	Canada	95–65	France	Jakarta, Indonesia
20:30 (UTC+7)	Scoring by quarter: 14–18, 29–22, 25–8, 27–17
	Pts: Gilgeous-Alexander 27; Rebs: Gilgeous-Alexander 13; Asts: Gilgeous-Alexander 6	Boxscore	Pts: Fournier 21; Rebs: Gobert 9 Asts: Okobo 4	Arena: Indonesia Arena; Attendance: 12,091; Referees: Roberto Vázquez (PUR), Johnny Batista (PUR), Gvidas Gedvilas (LTU)

27 August 2023 2023 FIBA World Cup – Group stage	France	86–88	Latvia	Jakarta, Indonesia
20:30 (UTC+7)	Scoring by quarter: 33–26, 20–23, 21–13, 12–26
	Pts: Fournier 27; Rebs: Gobert 7 Asts: De Colo 8	Boxscore	Pts: Žagars 22; Rebs: R. Kurucs 5 Asts: Žagars 5	Arena: Indonesia Arena; Attendance: 9,628; Referees: Julio Anaya (PAN), Juan Fernández (ARG), Andrés Bartel (URU)

29 August 2023 2023 FIBA World Cup – Group stage	Lebanon	79–85	France	Jakarta, Indonesia
16:45 (UTC+7)	Scoring by quarter: 20–19, 17–19, 22–20, 20–27
	Pts: Arakji 29; Rebs: Haidar, Zeinoun 6 Asts: Arakji, El Darwich 6	Boxscore	Pts: Fournier 17; Rebs: Cordinier 5 Asts: Okobo 5	Arena: Indonesia Arena; Attendance: 6,549; Referees: Aleksandar Glišić (SRB), Yevgeniy Mikheyev (KAZ), Daigo Urushima (JPN)

31 August 2023 2023 FIBA World Cup – Classifying round	France	82–55	Iran	Jakarta, Indonesia
20:30 (UTC+7)	Scoring by quarter: 9–12, 26–15, 19–9, 28–19
	Pts: Okobo 13; Rebs: Gobert 9 Asts: De Colo 7	Boxscore	Pts: Mirzaei, Yakhchali 11; Rebs: three players 6 Asts: Yakhchali 4	Arena: Indonesia Arena; Attendance: 4,494; Referees: Aleksandar Glišić (SRB), Andrés Bartel (URU), Yevgeniy Mikheyev (KAZ)

2 September 2023 2023 FIBA World Cup – Classifying round	Ivory Coast	77–87	France	Jakarta, Indonesia
16:45 (UTC+7)	Scoring by quarter: 21–25, 20–15, 20–22, 16–25
	Pts: Zouzoua 18; Rebs: V. Fofana 7 Asts: Diabate 11	Boxscore	Pts: Cordinier 19; Rebs: Gobert 8 Asts: Francisco 7	Arena: Indonesia Arena; Attendance: 9,404; Referees: Andrés Bartel (URU), Scott Beker (AUS), Daigo Urushima (JPN)

=== 2024 ===
23 February 2024 EuroBasket 2025 qualifiers	France	73–61	Croatia	Brest, France
20:30 CET (UTC+1)	Scoring by quarter: 15–14, 20–16, 22–14, 16–17
	Pts: Luwawu-Cabarrot 15; Rebs: Cordinier 6 Asts: Albicy, Inglis 4	Boxscore	Pts: Hezonja 22; Rebs: three players 5 Asts: three players 3	Arena: Brest Arena; Attendance: 5,029; Referees: Wojciech Liszka (POL), Michał Proc (POL), Mehmet Karabilecen (TUR)

26 February 2024 EuroBasket 2025 qualifiers	Bosnia and Herzegovina	64–74	France	Tuzla, Bosnia and Herzegovina
19:00 CET (UTC+1)	Scoring by quarter: 15–16, 17–18, 16–23, 16–17
	Pts: Musa 15; Rebs: Kamenjaš 6 Asts: Musa 3	Boxscore	Pts: Yabusele 16; Rebs: Yabusele 9 Asts: Yabusele 3	Arena: Dvorana Mejdan; Attendance: 4,500; Referees: Luis Castillo (ESP), Kerem Baki (TUR), Dariusz Zapolski (POL)

3 July 2024 Friendly	France	96–46	Turkey	Rouen, France
21:00 CEST (UTC+2)	Scoring by quarter: 26–14, 24–14, 17–9, 29–9
	Pts: Wembanyama 24; Rebs: Wembanyama 6 Asts: four players 4	Boxscore	Pts: Şanlı 11; Rebs: Yılmaz 5 Asts: Sipahi 4	Arena: Kindarena; Attendance: 5,000

6 July 2024 Friendly	Germany	66–90	France	Cologne, Germany
16:00 CEST (UTC+2)	Scoring by quarter: 11–23, 17–25, 17–20, 21–22
	Pts: Schröder 23; Rebs: Voigtmann 11; Asts: Schröder 6	Boxscore	Pts: Wembanyama 25; Rebs: Gobert 7 Asts: three players 3	Arena: Lanxess Arena; Attendance: 18,500

8 July 2024 Friendly	France	65–70	Germany	Montpellier, France
21:00 CEST (UTC+2)	Scoring by quarter: 19–11, 20–28, 14–20, 12–11
	Pts: Batum, Coulibaly 11; Rebs: Gobert 9 Asts: Strazel 4	Boxscore	Pts: Schröder, F. Wagner 17; Rebs: Da Silva, Voigtmann 8 Asts: Schröder 4	Arena: Sud de France Arena; Attendance: 10,000

12 July 2024 Friendly	France	67–79	Serbia	Lyon, France
21:00 CEST (UTC+2)	Scoring by quarter: 23–18, 9–27, 20–15, 15–19
	Pts: Wembanyama 14; Rebs: Wembanyama 10; Asts: three players 3	Boxscore	Pts: Jokić 20; Rebs: Jokić 12; Asts: Avramović, Micić 3	Arena: LDLC Arena; Attendance: 9,500

19 July 2024 Friendly	France	73–85	Canada	Orléans, France
21:00 CEST (UTC+2)	Scoring by quarter: 19–25, 21–19, 18–20, 15–21
	Pts: Yabusele 19; Rebs: Wembanyama 7 Asts: Wembanyama 4	Boxscore	Pts: Gilgeous-Alexander 23; Rebs: Birch 6 Asts: Gilgeous-Alexander, Nembhard 5	Arena: CO'Met Arena

21 July 2024 Friendly	France	82–83	Australia	Orléans, France
21:00 CEST (UTC+2)	Scoring by quarter: 28–27, 22–17, 13–19, 19–20
	Pts: Wembanyama 17; Rebs: Wembanyama 12; Asts: Wembanyama 8	Boxscore	Pts: Mills 24; Rebs: Giddey 6 Asts: Giddey 8	Arena: CO'Met Arena; Attendance: 7,005

27 July 2024 2024 Summer Olympics Group stage	France	78–66	Brazil	Lille, France
17:15 CEST (UTC+2)	Scoring by quarter: 15–23, 24–13, 18–9, 21–21
	Pts: Batum, Wembanyama 19; Rebs: Wembanyama 9 Asts: Albicy 4	Boxscore	Pts: Felício, Meindl 14; Rebs: Felício 6 Asts: Yago 6	Arena: Stade Pierre-Mauroy; Attendance: 26,766; Referees: Matthew Kallio (CAN), Luis Castillo (ESP), Carlos Peralta (ECU)

30 July 2024 2024 Summer Olympics Group stage	Japan	90–94(OT)	France	Lille, France
17:15 CEST (UTC+2)	Scoring by quarter: 25–32, 19–17, 20–20, 20–15, Overtime: 6–10
	Pts: Kawamura 29; Rebs: Hawkinson, Watanabe 8 Asts: Kawamura 6	Boxscore	Pts: Wembanyama 18; Rebs: Gobert 15; Asts: Fournier, Wembanyama 6	Arena: Stade Pierre-Mauroy; Attendance: 26,900; Referees: Matthew Kallio (CAN), Wojciech Liszka (POL), Blanca Burns (USA)

2 August 2024 2024 Summer Olympics Group stage	France	71–85	Germany	Lille, France
21:00 CEST (UTC+2)	Scoring by quarter: 18–24, 9–24, 19–21, 25–16
	Pts: Wembanyama 14; Rebs: Wembanyama 12; Asts: Batum 3	Boxscore	Pts: Schröder, F. Wagner 26; Rebs: Theis 8 Asts: Schröder 9	Arena: Stade Pierre-Mauroy; Attendance: 26,860; Referees: Antonio Conde (ESP), Juan Fernández (ARG), Andrés Bartel (URU)

6 August 2024 2024 Summer Olympics Quarter-finals	France	82–73	Canada	Paris, France
18:00 CEST (UTC+2)	Scoring by quarter: 23–10, 22–19, 16–21, 21–23
	Pts: Yabusele 22; Rebs: Wembanyama 12; Asts: Wembanyama 5	Boxscore	Pts: Gilgeous-Alexander 27; Rebs: Powell 9 Asts: Gilgeous-Alexander 4	Arena: Accor Arena; Attendance: 12,258; Referees: Ademir Zurapović (BIH), Omar Bermúdez (MEX), Gatis Saliņš (LAT)

8 August 2024 2024 Summer Olympics Semi-finals	France	73–69	Germany	Paris, France
17:30 CEST (UTC+2)	Scoring by quarter: 18–25, 15–8, 23–17, 17–19
	Pts: Yabusele 17; Rebs: three players 7 Asts: Wembanyama 4	Boxscore	Pts: Schröder 18; Rebs: Theis 11; Asts: Theis 6	Arena: Accor Arena; Attendance: 12,454; Referees: Antonio Conde (ESP), Boris Krejić (SVN), Wojciech Liszka (POL)

10 August 2024 2024 Summer Olympics Gold medal game	France	87–98	United States	Paris, France
21:30 CEST (UTC+2)	Scoring by quarter: 15–20, 26–29, 25–23, 21–26
	Pts: Wembanyama 26; Rebs: Batum 8 Asts: Batum 4	Boxscore	Pts: Curry 24; Rebs: Davis 9 Asts: James 10	Arena: Accor Arena; Attendance: 12,121; Referees: Antonio Conde (ESP), Julio Anaya (PAN), Wojciech Liszka (POL)

21 November 2024 EuroBasket 2025 qualifiers	Cyprus	59–75	France	Nicosia, Cyprus
19:00 EET (UTC+2)	Scoring by quarter: 15–20, 16–17, 19–14, 9–24
	Pts: Simitzis 22; Rebs: Willis 6 Asts: Tigkas 4	Boxscore	Pts: Bouteille, Makoundou 15; Rebs: Makoundou 7 Asts: Benitez 5	Arena: Eleftheria Indoor Hall; Attendance: 1,500; Referees: Ariadna Chueca (ESP), Carsten Straube (GER), Ofer Manheim (ISR)

24 November 2024 EuroBasket 2025 qualifiers	France	85–70	Cyprus	Poitiers, France
17:00 CET (UTC+1)	Scoring by quarter: 28–14, 19–20, 21–24, 17–12
	Pts: Bouteille 15; Rebs: Bouteille, Pansa 7 Asts: Benitez 6	Boxscore	Pts: Tigkas, Willis 18; Rebs: Willis 9 Asts: Tigkas 5	Arena: Arena Futuroscope; Attendance: 4,864; Referees: Marius Ciulin (ROU), Viola Györgyi (NOR), Zdenko Tomašovič (SVK)

=== 2025 ===
21 February 2025 EuroBasket 2025 qualifiers	Croatia	80–83	France	Zadar, Croatia
20:00 CET (UTC+1)	Scoring by quarter: 17–20, 18–17, 16–22, 29–24
	Pts: Hezonja 37; Rebs: Hezonja 11; Asts: Mavra 4	Boxscore	Pts: Okobo 16; Rebs: Massa 7 Asts: Strazel 5	Arena: Jazine Basketball Hall; Attendance: 2,700; Referees: Manuel Mazzoni (ITA), Mārtiņš Kozlovskis (LAT), Gatis Saliņš (LAT)

24 February 2025 EuroBasket 2025 qualifiers	France	76–74	Bosnia and Herzegovina	Orléans, France
21:10 CET (UTC+1)	Scoring by quarter: 18–21, 16–11, 17–25, 25–17
	Pts: Makoundou, Strazel 15; Rebs: Cornelie 6 Asts: Okobo 4	Boxscore	Pts: Castaneda 16; Rebs: Kamenjaš 11; Asts: three players 3	Arena: CO'Met Arena; Attendance: 6,769; Referees: Wojciech Liszka (POL), Lorenzo Baldini (ITA), Ivor Matějek (CZE)

4 August 2025 Friendly	France	81–75	Montenegro	Mouilleron-le-Captif, France
21:00 CEST (UTC+2)	Scoring by quarter: 24–13, 14–14, 21–28, 22–20
	Pts: Sarr 19; Rebs: Risacher, Sarr 4 Asts: Strazel 4	Boxscore	Pts: Vučević 19; Rebs: Drobnjak, Vučević 6 Asts: Mihailović, Vučević 4	Arena: Vendéspace; Referees: Joseph Bissang (FRA), Yohan Rosso (FRA), Jérémy Foucault (FRA)

8 August 2025 Friendly	France	74–67	Great Britain	Pau, France
21:00 CEST (UTC+2)	Scoring by quarter: 16–16, 19–11, 24–17, 15–23
	Pts: Jaiteh, Risacher 12; Rebs: Risacher 6 Asts: Maledon 8	Boxscore	Pts: Belo, Yeboah 11; Rebs: Horchler 7 Asts: Wheatle 4	Arena: Palais des Sports de Pau

14 August 2025 Friendly	Spain	67–75	France	Badalona, Spain
21:00 CEST (UTC+2)	Scoring by quarter: 14–25, 21–18, 17–15, 15–17
	Pts: W. Hernangómez 15; Rebs: J. Hernangómez 7 Asts: three players 3	Boxscore	Pts: Hoard 13; Rebs: four players 5 Asts: Francisco 5	Arena: Palau Municipal d'Esports de Badalona

16 August 2025 Friendly	France	78–73	Spain	Paris, France
21:00 CEST (UTC+2)	Scoring by quarter: 12–21, 16–23, 30–20, 20–9
	Pts: Coulibaly 13; Rebs: Yabusele 6 Asts: Okobo, Strazel 4	Boxscore	Pts: Yusta 19; Rebs: Pradilla 5 Asts: Yusta 7	Arena: Accor Arena

24 August 2025 Friendly	Greece	77–92	France	Athens, Greece
20:00 EEST (UTC+3)	Scoring by quarter: 20–17, 29–26, 12–28, 16–21
	Pts: G. Antetokounmpo 20; Rebs: Mitoglou, Papanikolaou 3 Asts: G. Antetokounmpo, Mitoglou 3	Boxscore; Video	Pts: Maledon 16; Rebs: three players 5 Asts: Maledon 5	Arena: Telekom Center Athens

28 August 2025 EuroBasket 2025 – Group stage	Belgium	64–92	France	Katowice, Poland
17:00 CEST (UTC+2)	Scoring by quarter: 10–18, 17–25, 22–27, 15–22
	Pts: Vanwijn 13; Rebs: Bako 7 Asts: Van Den Eynde 6	Boxscore	Pts: Coulibaly, Okobo 12; Rebs: Coulibaly 7 Asts: Francisco 6	Arena: Spodek; Attendance: 2,472; Referees: Takaki Kato (JPN), Zafer Yilmaz (TUR), Mihkel Männiste (EST)

30 August 2025 EuroBasket 2025 – Group stage	France	103–95	Slovenia	Katowice, Poland
17:00 CEST (UTC+2)	Scoring by quarter: 28–30, 19–24, 21–16, 35–25
	Pts: Francisco 32; Rebs: Francisco, Yabusele 7 Asts: Francisco, Okobo 5	Boxscore	Pts: Dončić 39; Rebs: Dončić, Murić 8 Asts: Dončić 9	Arena: Spodek; Attendance: 8,574; Referees: Takaki Kato (JPN), Gatis Saliņš (LAT), Yener Yılmaz (TUR)

31 August 2025 EuroBasket 2025 – Group stage	Israel	82–69	France	Katowice, Poland
17:00 CEST (UTC+2)	Scoring by quarter: 17–22, 19–14, 19–20, 27–13
	Pts: Avdija 23; Rebs: Avdija, Sorkin 8 Asts: Madar, Timor 3	Boxscore	Pts: Risacher 14; Rebs: Jaiteh, Luwawu-Cabarrot 5 Asts: Okobo 5	Arena: Spodek; Attendance: 7,158; Referees: Gatis Saliņš (LAT), Martin Vulić (CRO), Ivor Matějek (CZE)

2 September 2025 EuroBasket 2025 – Group stage	France	83–76	Poland	Katowice, Poland
20:30 CEST (UTC+2)	Scoring by quarter: 27–24, 14–20, 19–11, 23–21
	Pts: Yabusele 36; Rebs: Yabusele 6 Asts: Okobo 10	Boxscore	Pts: Loyd 18; Rebs: Sokołowski 6 Asts: Łączyński 8	Arena: Spodek; Attendance: 9,262; Referees: Takaki Kato (JPN), Kerem Baki (TUR), Yener Yılmaz (TUR)

4 September 2025 EuroBasket 2025 – Group stage	France	114–74	Iceland	Katowice, Poland
14:00 CEST (UTC+2)	Scoring by quarter: 36–9, 30–25, 24–12, 24–28
	Pts: Risacher 15; Rebs: Risacher 7 Asts: three players 5	Boxscore	Pts: Hermannsson 15; Rebs: Gunnarsson 6 Asts: three players 3	Arena: Spodek; Attendance: 4,088; Referees: Yener Yılmaz (TUR), Martin Vulić (CRO), Ivor Matějek (CZE)

7 September 2025 EuroBasket 2025 – Round of 16	France	70–80	Georgia	Riga, Latvia
15:15 EEST (UTC+3)	Scoring by quarter: 20–24, 17–14, 17–20, 16–22
	Pts: Francisco 14; Rebs: Jaiteh 7 Asts: Jaiteh 4	Boxscore	Pts: Baldwin, Shengelia 24; Rebs: Mamukelashvili 11; Asts: Bitadze 4	Arena: Xiaomi Arena; Attendance: 1,652; Referees: Jorge Vázquez (PUR), Kerem Baki (TUR), Ventsislav Velikov (BUL)

28 November 2025 2027 FIBA World Cup qualifiers – 1st round	France	79–63	Belgium	Rouen, France
20:30 CET (UTC+1)	Scoring by quarter: 20–24, 17–14, 17–20, 16–22
	Pts: Sene 15; Rebs: Gaudoux 8 Asts: Albicy 6	Boxscore	Pts: Obasohan 14; Rebs: Bolavie, Van Vliet 5 Asts: four players 2	Arena: Kindarena; Attendance: 4,206; Referees: Antonio Conde (ESP), Paulo Marques (POR), Valerio Grigioni (ITA)

1 December 2025 2027 FIBA World Cup qualifiers – 1st round	Finland	83–76	France	Espoo, Finland
18:30 EET (UTC+2)	Scoring by quarter: 20–19, 17–26, 19–16, 27–15
	Pts: Maxhuni 22; Rebs: Jantunen 9 Asts: Jantunen 6	Boxscore	Pts: Strazel 11; Rebs: Gaudoux 7 Asts: Sene, Strazel 3	Arena: Espoo Metro Areena; Attendance: 6,683; Referees: Ademir Zurapović (BIH), Fernando Calatrava (ESP), Juozas Barkauskas (LTU)

=== 2026 ===
27 February 2026 2027 FIBA World Cup qualifiers – 1st round	Hungary	71–74	France	Szombathely, Hungary
18:00 CET (UTC+1)	Scoring by quarter: 15–16, 16–22, 16–17, 24–19
	Pts: Perl 21; Rebs: Golomán 6 Asts: Somogyi 7	Boxscore	Pts: Noua 15; Rebs: Cornelie, Noua 6 Asts: Francisco 5	Arena: Arena Savaria; Attendance: 2,900; Referees: Gvidas Gedvilas (LTU), Zafer Yılmaz (TUR), Ofer Manheim (ISR)

1 March 2026 2027 FIBA World Cup qualifiers – 1st round	France	98–79	Hungary	Le Mans, France
18:00 CET (UTC+1)	Scoring by quarter: 25–16, 30–19, 19–24, 24–20
	Pts: Noua 21; Rebs: Hoard 6 Asts: Okobo 5	Boxscore	Pts: Perl 18; Rebs: four players 4 Asts: Perl 5	Arena: Antarès; Attendance: 5,812; Referees: Petar Pešić (SRB), Ivor Matějek (CZE), Ioannis Agrafiotis (GRE)

3 July 2026 2027 FIBA World Cup qualifiers – 1st round	Belgium	72–80	France	Antwerp, Belgium
20:30 CEST (UTC+2)	Scoring by quarter: 13–22, 17–21, 25–16, 17–21
	Pts: Lecomte 17; Rebs: Van Vliet 6 Asts: Van Den Eynde 7	Boxscore	Pts: Coulibaly 13; Rebs: Gobert 11; Asts: Hifi 6	Arena: Lotto Arena; Attendance: 4,436; Referees: Michał Proc (POL), Andrea Bongiorni (ITA), Łukasz Jankowski (POL)

6 July 2026 2027 FIBA World Cup qualifiers – 1st round	France	98–69	Finland	Pau, France
20:30 CEST (UTC+2)	Scoring by quarter: 31–16, 18–14, 28–17, 21–22
	Pts: Okobo, Raynaud 16; Rebs: Hoard 8 Asts: Strazel 7	Boxscore	Pts: Jantunen, Markkanen 14; Rebs: Jantunen 5 Asts: Maxhuni 5	Arena: Palais des Sports de Pau; Attendance: 7,131; Referees: Luis Castillo (ESP), Martin Vulić (CRO), Ilias Kounellis (CYP)

20 August 2026 Friendly	Serbia	90–87	France	Belgrade, Serbia
20:00 CEST (UTC+2)	Scoring by quarter: 22–19, 24–26, 26–17, 18–25
	Pts: Jokić 20; Rebs: Jokić 9 Asts: Jokić 8	Boxscore; Video	Pts: Noua 14; Rebs: three players 5 Asts: Francisco, Gobert 3	Arena: Belgrade Arena; Attendance: 17,026

23 August 2026 Friendly	France	91–90	Serbia	Orléans, France
18:00 CEST (UTC+2)	Scoring by quarter: 27–22, 27–13, 14–27, 23–28
	Pts: Francisco 20; Rebs: Noua 9 Asts: Francisco, Strazel 4	Boxscore; Video	Pts: Jokić 34; Rebs: Jokić 13; Asts: Jokić 5	Arena: CO'Met Arena; Attendance: 10,200

27 August 2026 2027 FIBA World Cup qualifiers – 2nd round	France	92–67	Slovenia	Paris, France
20:30 CEST (UTC+2)	Scoring by quarter: 31–17, 23–18, 19–15, 19–17
	Pts: Wembanyama 22; Rebs: Wembanyama 9 Asts: Strazel 6	Boxscore	Pts: Glas, Krampelj 10; Rebs: Omić 11; Asts: Samar 5	Arena: Accor Arena; Attendance: 15,831; Referees: Antonio Conde (ESP), Paulo Marques (POR), Andris Aunkrogers (LAT)

30 August 2026 2027 FIBA World Cup qualifiers – 2nd round	Sweden	69–84	France	Stockholm, Sweden
17:30 CEST (UTC+2)	Scoring by quarter: 24–20, 14–18, 16–17, 15–29
	Pts: Larsson 23; Rebs: Gaddefors 10; Asts: Birgander 7	Boxscore	Pts: Wembanyama 18; Rebs: Wembanyama 8 Asts: Strazel 6	Arena: Avicii Arena; Attendance: 14,750; Referees: Martin Horozov (BUL), Georgios Poursanidis (GRE), Siniša Prpa (SRB)

27 November 2026 2027 FIBA World Cup qualifiers – 2nd round	Estonia	vs.	France	Tallinn, Estonia
19:00 EET (UTC+2)
		Boxscore		Arena: Unibet Arena

30 November 2026 2027 FIBA World Cup qualifiers – 2nd round	France	vs.	Sweden	Dijon, France
20:30 CET (UTC+1)
		Boxscore		Arena: Palais des sports Jean-Michel-Geoffroy

=== 2027 ===
25 February 2027 2027 FIBA World Cup qualifiers – 2nd round	Slovenia	vs.	France	Slovenia
--:-- CET (UTC+1)
		Boxscore

28 February 2027 2027 FIBA World Cup qualifiers – 2nd round	France	vs.	Estonia	France
--:-- CET (UTC+1)
		Boxscore
