= Valentyn Melnychuk =

Valentyn Melnychuk may refer to:

- Valentyn Melnychuk (basketball)
- Valentyn Melnychuk (politician)
