= Montenegro men's national basketball team =

Men's national basketball team representing Montenegro

Montenegro
- FIBA ranking: 18 (1 September 2026)
- Joined FIBA: 2006
- FIBA zone: FIBA Europe
- National federation: Basketball Federation of Montenegro (KSCG)
- Coach: Andrej Žakelj
- Nickname(s): Црна Гора / Crna Gora (The Black Mountain)

FIBA World Cup
- Appearances: 2
- Medals: None

EuroBasket
- Appearances: 5
- Medals: None

Games of the Small States of Europe
- Appearances: 3
- Medals: (gold) Gold: (2015, 2019); (silver) Silver: (2017)
First	Second

First international
- Netherlands 63–70 Montenegro (Almere, Netherlands; 6 September 2008)

Biggest win
- San Marino 37–100 Montenegro (Serravalle, San Marino; 2 June 2017)

Biggest defeat
- Spain 99–60 Montenegro (Cluj-Napoca, Romania; 1 September 2017)

The Montenegro men's national basketball team (Montenegrin: Кошаркашка репрезентација Црне Горе, romanized: Košarkaška reprezentacija Crne Gore) represents Montenegro in international basketball tournaments. The supervising body is the Basketball Federation of Montenegro.

Montenegro joined FIBA in 2006, following the restoration of Montenegrin independence in the same year. Since 2006, Montenegro has qualified for EuroBasket five times (2011, 2013, 2017, 2022, 2025). They have reached the global stage at the FIBA World Cup twice, in 2019 and 2023. The national team has also taken part in smaller tournaments such as the Games of the Small States of Europe.

== History ==
=== 2006–2014 ===
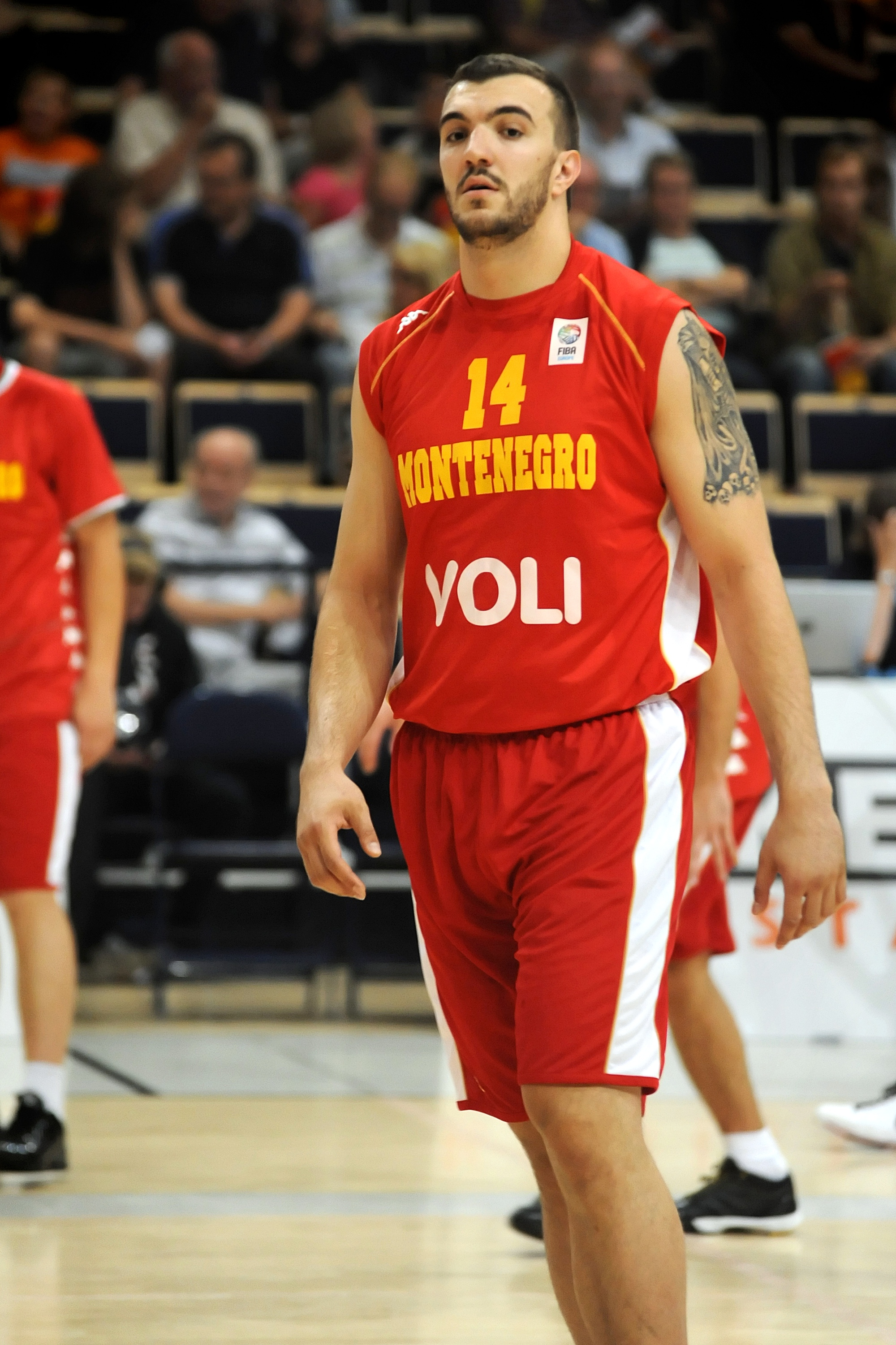
Nikola Peković played a single game for Montenegro national team in 2011

In 2006, the Basketball Federation of Montenegro along with this team joined the International Basketball Federation (FIBA) on its own following the Independence of Montenegro.

The Montenegrin national team entered international competition in 2008, and appointed Duško Vujošević as the national coach. Montenegro started from FIBA Division B, where they won first place in their first competitive season. Since becoming a separate team, Montenegro has won 13 official games in a row, until losing to Israel in August 2010.

At that time, NBA players like Nikola Vučević and Nikola Peković became the most known players of Montenegrin national team.

In their first qualifiers for EuroBasket, Montenegro finished first in the group. So, the team qualified for Eurobasket 2011, where they played five games in the first phase – with one win and four losses. The Coach of Montenegro at their first-ever EuroBasket was Dejan Radonjić.

In August 2012, with the new coach Luka Pavićević, Montenegro started qualifiers for Eurobasket 2013. Again, they won first place, but without any defeat from 10 matches. Notable matches were against Serbia, first after the two countries separated. Montenegro won both games, and victory in Belgrade (73:71), in front of 18,000 spectators, is gained by Nikola Ivanović three-point shot from the center, one second before the end of the match.

As the first-place team in qualifiers, Montenegro participated at Eurobasket 2013 in Slovenia. They made better results than 2011, with two wins and three defeats, but that was not enough for the second phase of EuroBasket.

First unsuccessful qualifying campaign since independence, Montenegro had during the 2014. Surprisingly, group stage at the EuroBasket 2015 qualification, Montenegro finished third, so they failed to qualify for the final tournament.

=== 2015–present ===
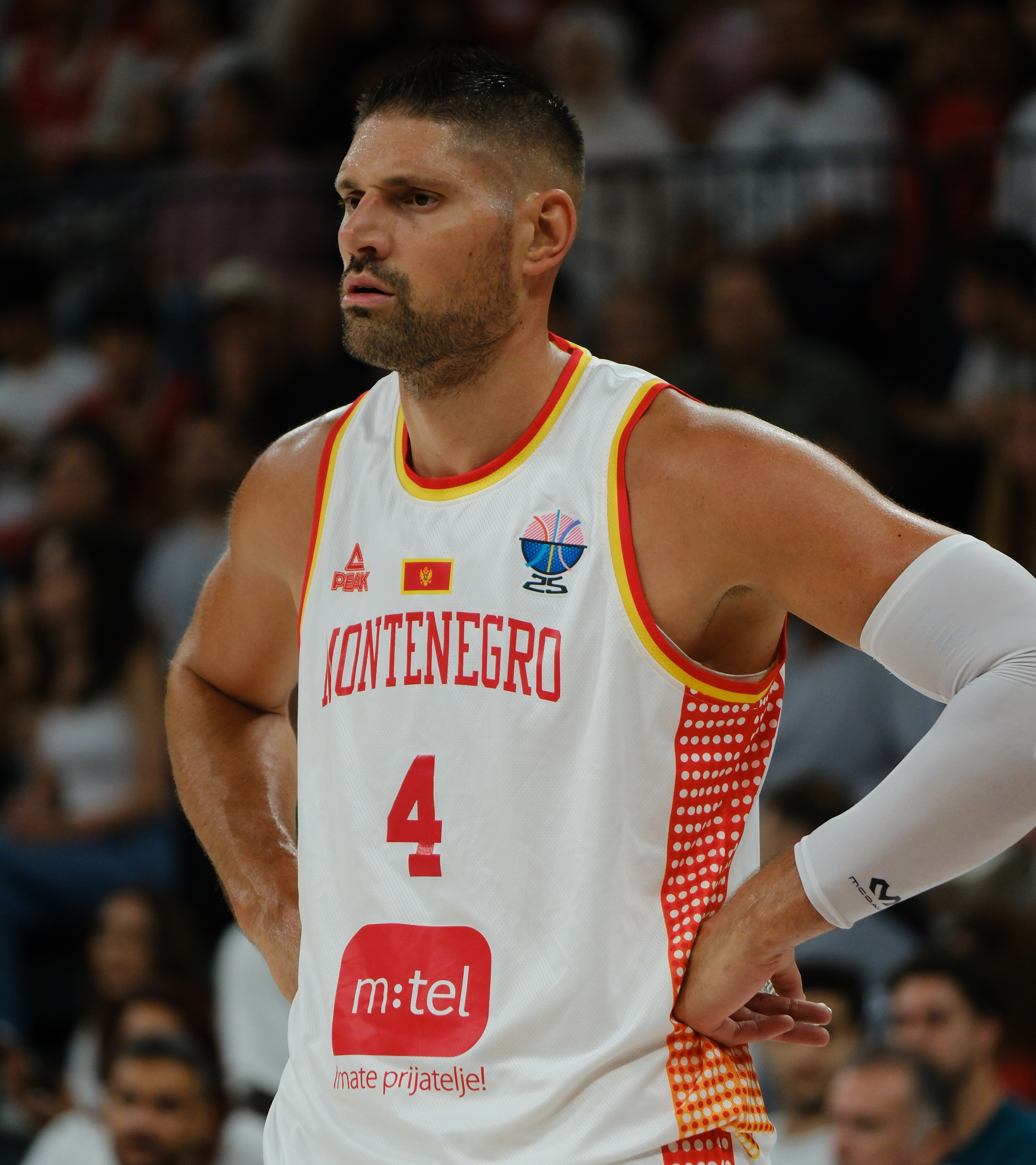
Nikola Vučević representing Montenegro in EuroBasket 2025

In 2015, Montenegro named Bogdan Tanjević new head coach of the national team. Prior to taking the reins of the national team, he was the head coach of Fenerbahçe. As the national team earlier failed to qualify for EuroBasket 2015, they participated in the Games of the Small States of Europe (European countries with less than a million citizens) in Iceland and easily won the gold medal.

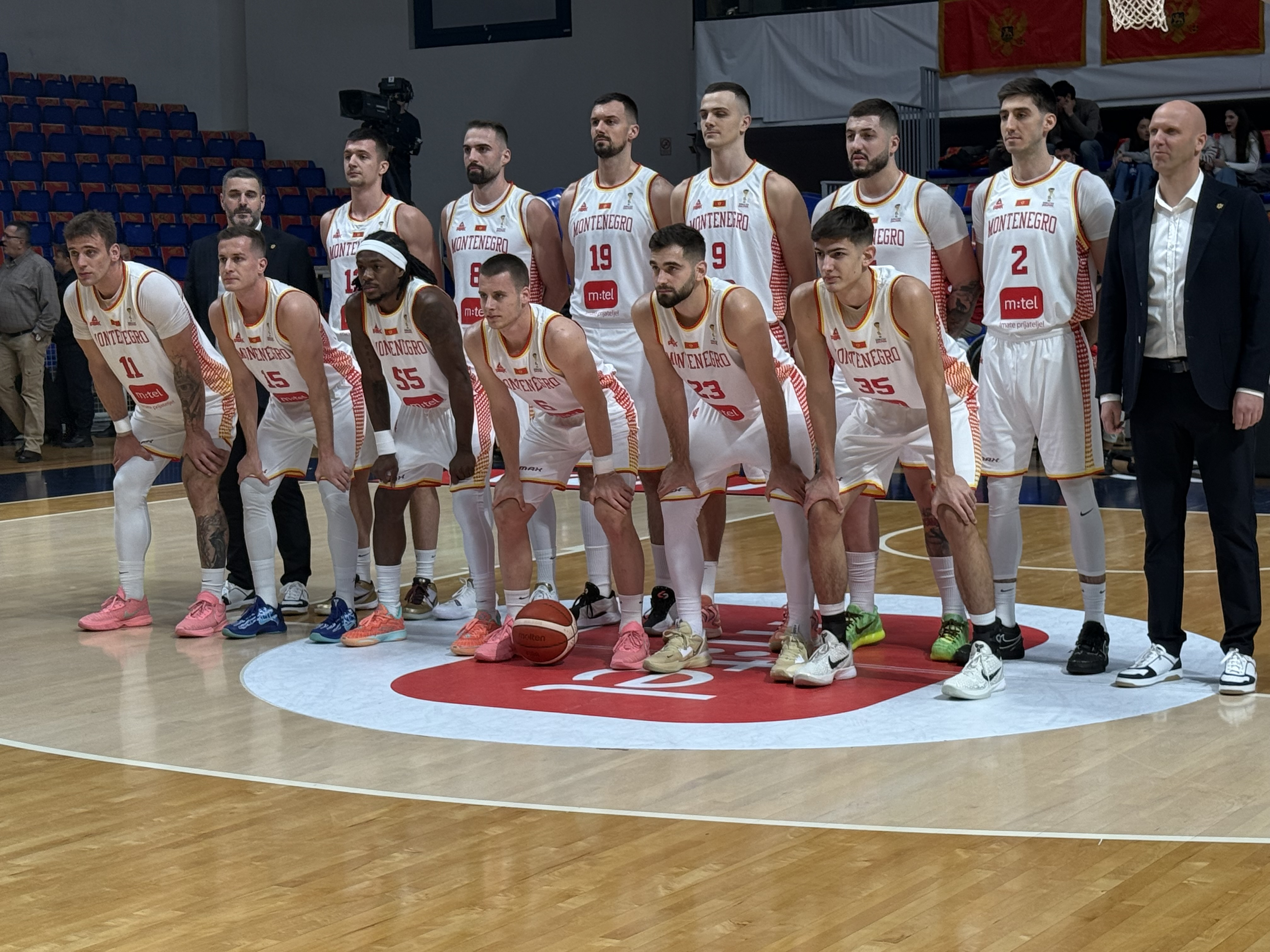
Montenegro vs Portugal in November 2025 for 2027 FIBA World Cup qualifying

In summer 2016, Montenegro started competition in EuroBasket 2017 qualifiers, with the only ambition to qualify for their third final tournament since independence. In a group with Georgia, Slovakia and Albania, Montenegro finished as a second-place team, with one defeat, and qualified for EuroBasket 2017.

For the first time in their history, in Eurobasket 2017, Montenegro finished as a third-place team in the group stage and qualified to the knockout stage. At that time, that was the biggest success of the Montenegrin national team since its independence in 2006. Two years later, Montenegro qualified for the 2019 FIBA World Cup for the first time, after a winner-take-all game in Podgorica against Latvia. Montenegro lost the game 80–74 but still went through as they had won the away game 84–75, thus holding the tiebreaker on points difference. With that result, Montenegro became the smallest state by population and territory to qualify for the FIBA World Cup since the establishing of competition.

== Competitive record ==
Montenegro has appeared twice at the FIBA World Cup (2019, 2023). At the continental level, Montenegro has appeared five times at EuroBasket (2011, 2013, 2017, 2022, 2025). Among other competitions as a country with less than a million inhabitants, Montenegro participated at the Games of the Small States of Europe, winning the gold medal in 2015 and 2019.

=== FIBA World Cup ===
World Cup					Qualification		
Year	Position	Pld	W	L	Pld	W	L
1950 to 1990	Part of Yugoslavia						
1994 to 2006	Part of Serbia and Montenegro						
(Turkey) 2010	Did not qualify				EuroBasket served as qualifiers		
(Spain) 2014	Did not qualify				EuroBasket served as qualifiers		
(China) 2019	25th	5	1	4	12	7	5
(Philippines) (Japan) (Indonesia) 2023	11th	5	3	2	16	11	5
(Qatar) 2027	To be determined				To be determined		
(France) 2031	To be determined				To be determined		
Total	2/4	10	4	6	28	18	10

=== Olympic Games ===
Olympic Games					Qualifying		
Year	Position	Pld	W	L	Pld	W	L
1936 to 1988	Part of Yugoslavia						
1992 to 2004	Part of Serbia and Montenegro						
(China) 2008	Did not enter				Did not enter		
(United Kingdom) 2012	Did not qualify				Did not qualify		
(Brazil) 2016	Did not qualify				Did not qualify		
(Japan) 2020	Did not qualify				Did not qualify		
(France) 2024	Did not qualify				2	1	1
(United States) 2028	To be determined				To be determined		
Total	0/5				2	1	1

=== EuroBasket ===
EuroBasket					Qualification		
Year	Position	Pld	W	L	Pld	W	L
1947 to 1991	Part of Yugoslavia						
1993 to 2005	Part of Serbia and Montenegro						
(Spain) 2007	Did not enter				Did not enter		
(Poland) 2009	Division B				10	10	0
(Lithuania) 2011	21st	5	1	4	8	6	2
(Slovenia) 2013	17th	5	2	3	10	10	0
(France) (Croatia) (Germany) (Latvia) 2015	Did not qualify				6	3	3
(Finland) (Israel) (Romania) (Turkey) 2017	13th	6	3	3	6	5	1
(Czech Republic) (Georgia (country)) (Italy) (Germany) 2022	13th	6	3	3	6	3	3
(Cyprus) (Finland) (Poland) (Latvia) 2025	20th	5	1	4	6	3	3
(Estonia) (Greece) (Slovenia) (Spain) 2029	To be determined				To be determined		
Total	5/8	27	10	17	52	40	12

=== Games of the Small States of Europe ===
Games of the Small States of Europe
Year	Position	Pld	W	L
(Iceland) 2015	1st place, gold medalist(s)	3	3	0
(San Marino) 2017	2nd place, silver medalist(s)	5	4	1
(Montenegro) 2019	1st place, gold medalist(s)	4	4	0
(Malta) 2023	4th	5	2	3
Total		17	13	4

== Results and fixtures ==
Win Loss

=== 2025 ===
27 November 2025 2027 FIBA World Cup qualifiers – 1st round	Montenegro	62–83	Portugal	Podgorica, Montenegro
18:00 (UTC+1)	Scoring by quarter: 21–14, 11–25, 11–25, 19–19
	Pts: Simonović 13; Rebs: Hadžibegović 9 Asts: Perry 6	Boxscore	Pts: Williams 16; Rebs: C. Sá 10; Asts: Ventura 5	Arena: Morača Sports Center; Attendance: 2,057; Referees: Gvidas Gedvilas (LTU), Fernando Calatrava (ESP), Tolga Edis (TUR)

30 November 2025 2027 FIBA World Cup qualifiers – 1st round	Romania	75–80	Montenegro	Pitești, Romania
19:00 (UTC+2)	Scoring by quarter: 17–26, 17–23, 22–16, 19–15
	Pts: Russell 20; Rebs: Diculescu 9 Asts: Russell 4	Boxscore	Pts: Perry 16; Rebs: Nikolić 6 Asts: Perry 10	Arena: Pitești Arena; Attendance: 3,473; Referees: Mārtiņš Kozlovskis (LAT), Dariusz Zapolski (POL), Çisil Güngör (TUR)

=== 2026 ===
27 February 2026 2027 FIBA World Cup qualifiers – 1st round	Greece	65–67	Montenegro	Athens, Greece
19:00 (UTC+2)	Scoring by quarter: 17–19, 21–21, 14–15, 13–12
	Pts: K. Antetokounmpo 13; Rebs: Papanikolaou 6 Asts: Mitrou-Long, Toliopoulos 4	Boxscore	Pts: Nikolić 19; Rebs: Hadžibegović, Simonović 7 Asts: Needham 6	Arena: SUNEL Arena; Attendance: 6,730; Referees: Antonio Conde (ESP), Andris Aunkrogers (LAT), Juozas Barkauskas (LTU)

2 March 2026 2027 FIBA World Cup qualifiers – 1st round	Montenegro	65–79	Greece	Podgorica, Montenegro
19:00 (UTC+1)	Scoring by quarter: 18–22, 17–22, 18–13, 12–22
	Pts: Drobnjak 14; Rebs: Drobnjak, Hadžibegović 6 Asts: Ivanović 4	Boxscore	Pts: Toliopoulos 27; Rebs: Mitoglou 8 Asts: Toliopoulos 10	Arena: Morača Sports Center; Attendance: 5,182; Referees: Gatis Saliņš (LAT), Lorenzo Baldini (ITA), Ventsislav Velikov (BUL)

2 July 2026 2027 FIBA World Cup qualifiers – 1st round	Portugal	68–72	Montenegro	Matosinhos, Portugal
19:00 (UTC+1)	Scoring by quarter: 13–23, 8–13, 20–13, 27–23
	Pts: Williams 21; Rebs: Queiroz, Relvão 8 Asts: Ventura 4	Boxscore	Pts: Drobnjak 18; Rebs: Hadžibegović 9 Asts: Ferrell 5	Arena: Centro de Desportos e Congressos de Matosinhos; Attendance: 1,612; Referees: Luis Castillo (ESP), Fernando Calatrava (ESP), Polat Parlak (TUR)

5 July 2026 2027 FIBA World Cup qualifiers – 1st round	Montenegro	65–64	Romania	Bar, Montenegro
20:30 (UTC+2)	Scoring by quarter: 17–14, 11–15, 27–21, 10–14
	Pts: Drobnjak 13; Rebs: Hadžibegović 12; Asts: Kljajić 5	Boxscore	Pts: Russell 17; Rebs: Cățe 8 Asts: five players 2	Arena: Topolica Sport Hall; Attendance: 2,055; Referees: Michał Proc (POL), Ritvars Helmšteins (LAT), Sergii Zashchuk (UKR)

28 August 2026 2027 FIBA World Cup qualifiers – 2nd round	Georgia	101–74	Montenegro	Tbilisi, Georgia
19:30 (UTC+4)	Scoring by quarter: 27–17, 21–25, 29–25, 24–7
	Pts: Shengelia 24; Rebs: Bitadze 8 Asts: Reed 8	Boxscore	Pts: Ferrell 12; Rebs: Radović, Šuškavčević 6 Asts: Ferrell 4	Arena: Tbilisi Arena; Attendance: 8,222; Referees: Yohan Rosso (FRA), Gintaras Mačiulis (LTU), Elvis Binders-Čoders (LAT)

31 August 2026 2027 FIBA World Cup qualifiers – 2nd round	Montenegro	89–98	Ukraine	Podgorica, Montenegro
20:30 (UTC+2)	Scoring by quarter: 18–19, 22–27, 22–26, 27–26
	Pts: Ferrell 22; Rebs: Šuškavčević 8 Asts: Kljajić 6	Boxscore	Pts: Mykhailiuk 23; Rebs: Skapintsev 7 Asts: Bobrov, Kovliar 5	Arena: Morača Sports Center; Attendance: 3,447; Referees: Mārtiņš Kozlovskis (LAT), Lorenzo Baldini (ITA), Edgard Ceccarelli (FRA)

26 November 2026 2027 FIBA World Cup qualifiers – 2nd round	Montenegro	vs.	Spain	Podgorica, Montenegro
19:00 (UTC+1)
		Boxscore		Arena: Morača Sports Center

29 November 2026 2027 FIBA World Cup qualifiers – 2nd round	Ukraine	vs.	Montenegro	Riga, Latvia
18:30 (UTC+2)
		Boxscore		Arena: Xiaomi Arena

=== 2027 ===
26 February 2027 2027 FIBA World Cup qualifiers – 2nd round	Montenegro	vs.	Georgia	Montenegro
--:-- (UTC+1)
		Boxscore

1 March 2027 2027 FIBA World Cup qualifiers – 2nd round	Spain	vs.	Montenegro	Spain
--:-- (UTC+1)
		Boxscore

== Team ==
=== Current roster ===
Roster for the 2027 FIBA World Cup Qualifiers matches on 28 and 30 August 2026 against Georgia and Ukraine.

Montenegro men's national basketball team roster
Players
Coaches

Pos.	No.	Name	Age – Date of birth	Height	Club	Ctr.
SF	0	Zoran Vučeljić	22 – 9 September 2003	1.97 m (6 ft 6 in)	Podgorica	(Montenegro)
PG	1	Yogi Ferrell	33 – 9 May 1993	1.83 m (6 ft 0 in)	Budućnost	(Montenegro)
SG	3	Jovan Kljajić	24 – 11 September 2001	1.98 m (6 ft 6 in)	Granada	(Spain)
SF	7	Andrija Slavković	27 – 15 February 1999	2.02 m (6 ft 8 in)	Budućnost	(Montenegro)
PF	8	Emir Hadžibegović	30 – 24 August 1996	2.06 m (6 ft 9 in)	Budućnost	(Montenegro)
C	9	Milan Šuškavčević	28 – 19 November 1997	2.11 m (6 ft 11 in)	GTK Gliwice	(Poland)
F/C	11	Nemanja Radović	34 – 11 November 1991	2.08 m (6 ft 10 in)	Ehime Orange Vikings	(Japan)
G	13	Đorđije Jovanović	23 – 15 May 2003	1.97 m (6 ft 6 in)	Budućnost	(Montenegro)
C	19	Zoran Nikolić	30 – 1 April 1996	2.12 m (6 ft 11 in)	Slovan	(Slovakia)
PG	22	Igor Drobnjak	26 – 21 April 2000	1.93 m (6 ft 4 in)	Spartak	(Serbia)
G	30	Petar Popović	28 – 13 September 1996	1.93 m (6 ft 4 in)	Igokea	(Bosnia and Herzegovina)
SG	44	Fedor Žugić	22 – 18 September 2003	1.96 m (6 ft 5 in)	Creighton Bluejays	(United States)

Head coach

- (Montenegro) Zvezdan Mitrović

Assistant coach(es)

- (Montenegro) Vladimir Todorović
- (Montenegro) Feđja Pajović

Legend

- (C) Team captain
- Club – describes last
  club before the competition
- Age – describes age
  on 28 August 2026

=== Depth chart ===
Pos.	Starting 5	Bench 1	Bench 2	Bench 3	Inactive
C	Marko Simonović	Zoran Nikolić	Aleksa Ilić	Filip Anđušić	Đorđe Gulić
PF	David Mirković	Emir Hadžibegović	Bojan Tomašević	Dino Radončić	Milan Šuškavčević
SF	Đorđije Jovanović	Andrija Grbović	Zoran Vučeljić	Andrija Slavković	Maksim Brnović
SG	Luka Bogavac	Fedor Žugić	Petar Popović	Jovan Kljajić
PG	Yogi Ferrell	Igor Drobnjak	Balša Živanović	Danilo Ivanović

=== Head coaches ===
The first head coach of Montenegro was Duško Vujošević. With him, Montenegro won the FIBA B division championship (2009). From 2010 to 2012, Montenegro was coached by Dejan Radonjić, who led the national team to their first EuroBasket (2011). At their next Eurobasket participation (2013), Montenegro was led by Luka Pavićević. From 2015 to 2017, the head coach of Montenegro was Bogdan Tanjević, who led Montenegro to their first-ever Second phase games at the Eurobasket (2016). After that tournament, the Basketball Federation of Montenegro named Zvezdan Mitrović new head coach of the national team. During his mandate, Montenegro for the first time qualified for the World Cup (2019), as the smallest state to ever play at the global tournament.

Years	Name	Record	Competitions
2007–2010	(Montenegro) Duško Vujošević	10–0	None
2010–2012	(Montenegro) Dejan Radonjić	7–6	EuroBasket 2011 (21st)
2012–2014	(Montenegro) Luka Pavićević	15–6	EuroBasket 2013 (17th)
2015–2017	(Montenegro) Bogdan Tanjević	15–5	GSS 2015 (1st); EuroBasket 2017 (13th); GSS 2017 (2nd)
2017–2019	(Montenegro) Zvezdan Mitrović	12–9	GSS 2019 (1st); World Cup 2019 (25th)
2019–2025	(Montenegro) Boško Radović	27–24	EuroBasket 2022 (13th); GSS 2023 (4th); World Cup 2023 (11th); EuroBasket 2025 (20th)
2025–2026	(Slovenia) Andrej Žakelj	2–2	None
2026–present	(Montenegro) Zvezdan Mitrović	2–2	

=== Past rosters ===
2011 EuroBasket: finished 21st among 24 teams

4 Nikola Vučević, 5 Goran Jeretin, 6 Boris Bakić, 7 Vlado Šćepanović, 8 Miloš Borisov, 9 Vladimir Mihailović, 10 Omar Cook,
11 Slavko Vraneš, 12 Milko Bjelica, 13 Vladimir Dragičević, 14 Nikola Peković, 15 Vladimir Dašić (Coach: (Montenegro) Dejan Radonjić)

2013 EuroBasket: finished 17th among 24 teams

4 Nikola Vučević, 5 Bojan Bakić, 6 Suad Šehović, 7 Aleksa Popović, 8 Sead Šehović, 9 Blagota Sekulić, 10 Nikola Ivanović,
11 Milko Bjelica, 12 Tyrese Rice, 13 Marko Popović, 14 Bojan Dubljević, 15 Vladimir Dašić (Coach: (Montenegro) Luka Pavićević)

2017 EuroBasket: finished 13th among 24 teams

2 Tyrese Rice, 4 Nikola Vučević, 6 Suad Šehović, 7 Nikola Pavličević, 8 Dino Radončić, 11 Marko Todorović, 14 Bojan Dubljević,
15 Filip Barović, 17 Vladimir Mihailović, 20 Nikola Ivanović, 21 Nemanja Vranješ, 22 Nemanja Đurišić (Coach: (Montenegro) Bogdan Tanjević)

2019 FIBA World Cup: finished 25th among 32 teams

4 Nikola Vučević, 5 Derek Needham, 6 Suad Šehović, 7 Nemanja Radović, 8 Sead Šehović, 10 Aleksa Popović, 11 Marko Todorović,
14 Bojan Dubljević, 20 Nikola Ivanović, 23 Dino Radončić, 30 Petar Popović, 51 Milko Bjelica (Coach: (Montenegro) Zvezdan Mitrović)

2022 EuroBasket: finished 13th among 24 teams

0 Zoran Vučeljić, 2 Aleksa Ilić, 3 Vladimir Mihailović, 4 Nikola Pavličević, 8 Dino Radončić, 9 Marko Simonović, 11 Nemanja Radović,
14 Bojan Dubljević (C), 19 Zoran Nikolić, 22 Igor Drobnjak, 30 Petar Popović, 55 Kendrick Perry (Coach: (Montenegro) Boško Radović)

2023 FIBA World Cup: finished 11th among 32 teams

2 Aleksa Ilić, 3 Vladimir Mihailović, 4 Nikola Vučević, 7 Andrija Slavković, 8 Dino Radončić, 11 Nemanja Radović, 14 Bojan Dubljević (C),
19 Marko Simonović, 20 Nikola Ivanović, 22 Igor Drobnjak, 30 Petar Popović, 55 Kendrick Perry (Coach: (Montenegro) Boško Radović)

2025 EuroBasket: finished 20th among 24 teams

0 Kyle Allman, 3 Vladimir Mihailović, 4 Nikola Vučević (C), 7 Andrija Slavković, 8 Emir Hadžibegović, 9 Marko Simonović,
10 Bojan Tomašević, 11 Zoran Vučeljić, 13 Đorđije Jovanović, 17 Balša Živanović, 19 Zoran Nikolić, 22 Igor Drobnjak
(Coach: (Montenegro) Boško Radović)

== Records ==
Largest home victory
102–58, Montenegro – Iceland, 26 August 2009, Podgorica
Largest away victory
37–100, San Marino – Montenegro, 2 June 2017, Serravalle
Largest home defeat
65–80, Montenegro – Israel, 20 August 2014, Podgorica
Largest away defeat
99–60, Spain – Montenegro, 1 September 2017, Cluj-Napoca
Longest winning streak
13 matches, (6 September 2008 – 14 August 2010)
Longest losing streak
4 matches, (1 September 2011 – 5 September 2011; 1 September 2019 – 9 September 2019)
Most scored points in a match
113, Albania – Montenegro 73–113
Least scored points in a match
55, Greece – Montenegro 71–55, Netherlands – Montenegro 68–55
Most conceded points in a match
104, Slovenia – Montenegro 104–100, (Friendly, 8 August 2023)
Least conceded points in a match
37, San Marino – Montenegro 37–100
Highest home attendance
5,500, Montenegro – Serbia 72–62, 2 September 2012, Podgorica
Highest away attendance
18,000, Serbia – Montenegro 71–73, 18 August 2012, Belgrade

=== Head to head record ===
Below is the list of official performances of the Montenegro national basketball team against every single opponent.

Opponents	Pld	W	L	PD
Albania	2	2	0	+78
Andorra	2	2	0	+61
Austria	2	2	0	+46
Belarus	2	2	0	+35
Belgium	1	1	0	+6
Bosnia and Herzegovina	4	1	3	-3
Brazil	2	0	2	-20
Bulgaria	5	5	0	+54
Cameroon	1	1	0	+4
Croatia	2	0	2	-10
Cyprus	2	1	1	+33
Czech Republic	3	3	0	+40
Denmark	4	4	0	+75
Egypt	1	1	0	+15
Estonia	2	2	0	+22
Finland	4	2	2	+8
France	4	1	3	-26
Georgia	4	2	2	-23
Germany	6	2	4	-66
Great Britain	3	1	2	-15
Greece	5	2	3	-49
Hungary	3	2	1	+36
Iceland	9	9	0	+150
Israel	6	4	2	+8
Italy	2	1	1	+8
Japan	1	1	0	+15
Latvia	6	3	3	+6
Lithuania	5	0	5	-80
Luxembourg	3	3	0	+51
North Macedonia	2	2	0	+6
Malta	1	1	0	+13
Mexico	1	1	0	+20
Netherlands	4	2	2	+14
New Zealand	1	0	1	-10
Portugal	4	3	1	+12
Romania	3	3	0	+23
San Marino	1	1	0	+63
Serbia	3	3	0	+19
Slovakia	4	4	0	+114
Slovenia	2	1	1	+1
Spain	4	0	4	-81
Sweden	5	4	1	+65
Turkey	4	1	3	-14
Ukraine	3	2	1	0
United States	1	0	1	-12
Total (44)	138	88	50	+711

Last updated: 31 August 2026

== Kit ==
=== Manufacturer ===
- (Italy) Kappa (2008–2011)
- (China) Peak (2011–2023)
- (Portugal) Dhika (2023–present)

=== Sponsor ===
- (Montenegro) VOLI (2008–2011)
- (Montenegro) diva (2012–2014)
- (Montenegro) EPCG (2014–2015)
- (Montenegro) m:tel (2015–present)

== See also ==
- Sport in Montenegro
- Montenegro women's national basketball team
- Montenegro men's national under-20 basketball team
- Montenegro men's national under-18 basketball team
- Montenegro men's national under-17 basketball team
- Montenegrin Basketball League
