= Boško Radović =

Montenegrin basketball coach

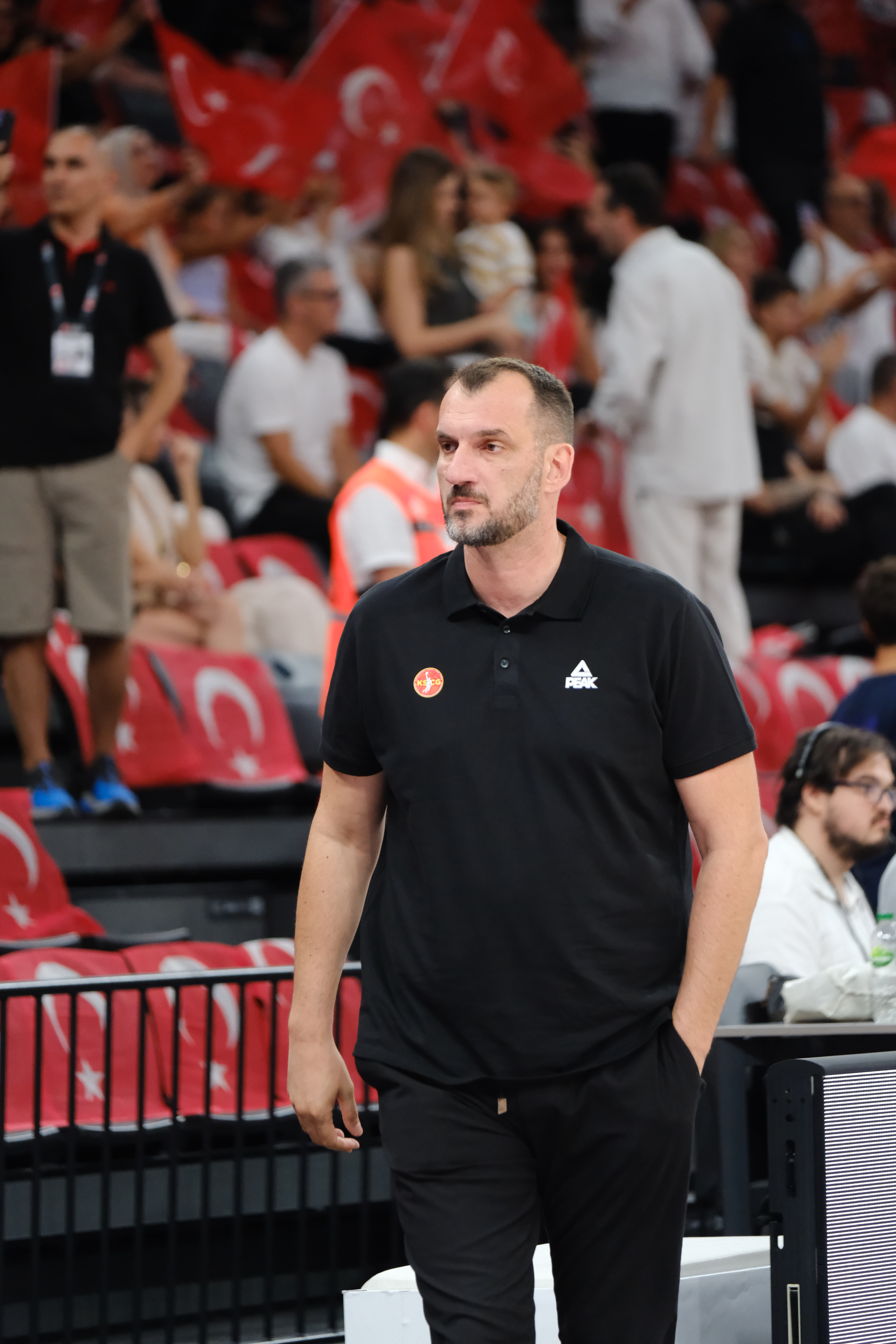
- Radović in 2025

Peja
- Title: Head coach
- League: Kosovo Basketball Superleague

Personal information
- Born: 26 May 1979 (age 47) Titograd, SFR Yugoslavia (now Podgorica, Montenegro)
- Listed height: 2.06 m (6 ft 9 in)
- Listed weight: 100 kg (220 lb)

Career information
- College: Hawaii (2000–2001)
- NBA draft: 2001: undrafted
- Playing career: 2001–2014
- Position: Small forward
- Coaching career: 2015–present

Career history

Coaching
- 2015–2019: Montenegro (assistant)
- 2019–2025: Montenegro
- 2025–2026: Guangdong Southern Tigers (assistant)
- 2026–present: Peja

Boško Radović (Serbian Cyrillic: Бошко Радовић; born 26 May 1979) is a Montenegrin professional basketball coach and former player, who is currently serving as the head coach for Peja of the Kosovo Basketball Superleague. He was formerly head coach of the Montenegro national team, from December 2019 and the resignation of Zvezdan Mitrović from the post, until 2025.

Prior to being promoted to head coach, he was an assistant for national team, during the tenure of Mitrović and Bogdan Tanjević, between 2015 and December 2019. He was also a long-time junior coach, and the coordinator of the junior sections of the Montenegro national team.
