= Dino Radončić =

Montenegrin basketball player (born 1999)

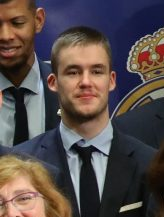
- Radončić in 2018

No. 8 – Básquet Coruña
- Position: Power forward / small forward
- League: Liga ACB

Personal information
- Born: 8 January 1999 (age 27) Giessen, Germany
- Listed height: 6 ft 8 in (2.03 m)
- Listed weight: 225 lb (102 kg)

Career information
- Playing career: 2015–present

Career history
- 2015–2019: Real Madrid
- 2015–2017: →Real Madrid B
- 2018–2019: →Burgos
- 2019: →Murcia
- 2019–2020: Murcia
- 2020: Canarias Tenerife
- 2020–2023: Zaragoza
- 2020–2021: →Gipuzkoa
- 2023–2024: Bayern Munich
- 2024–2025: Real Betis
- 2025–present: Coruña

Career highlights
- EuroLeague champion (2018); Spanish League champion (2018); Bundesliga champion (2024); German Cup winner (2024)

Dino Radončić (Cyrillic: Дино Радончић; born 8 January 1999) is a Montenegrin professional basketball player for Básquet Coruña of the Liga ACB. He also represents the Montenegro national team.

== Early life ==
Radončić was born in Germany, where his father, Damir Radončić, played professional handball. During his childhood, he also spent some time in Spain, where his father had signed with a club, before the family settled in Zrenjanin, Serbia, when he was eight years of age. Radončić started playing football, before turning to basketball, in the youth system of KK Uno Grande Zrenjanin.

== Professional career ==
In the 2013–14 season, Radončić played with the youth ranks of FC Barcelona. He moved to Real Madrid's youth teams one year later, for the 2014–15 season. He then played with Real Madrid's reserve team, Real Madrid B, in the 2015–16 season.

He also made his Spanish Liga ACB and EuroLeague debuts with Real Madrid's senior men's team, during the 2015–16 season. In the 2016–17 season, he also split playing time between Real Madrid's main team, and their reserve B team.

On 8 August 2018 Real Madrid loaned him to San Pablo Burgos for the 2018–19 season.

On July 25, 2019, Radončić part ways with Real Madrid and signed a two-year deal with UCAM Murcia. On February 25, 2020, he parted ways with UCAM Murcia. One day later, he signed with Iberostar Tenerife of the Liga ACB.

On August 11, 2020, he signed with Casademont Zaragoza. On September 14, 2023, he was signed by Bayern Munich.

On August 13, 2024, he signed with Real Betis Baloncesto of the LEB Oro.

On October 22, 2025, he signed with Básquet Coruña of the Primera FEB.

== National team career ==
Radončić had his first cap for the senior Montenegrin national basketball team in 2016, while playing in the EuroBasket 2017 qualifiers. He also played with Montenegro at the main EuroBasket 2017 tournament.

== Career statistics ==
Legend
GP	Games played	GS	Games started	MPG	Minutes per game
FG%	Field-goal percentage	3P%	3-point field-goal percentage	FT%	Free-throw percentage
RPG	Rebounds per game	APG	Assists per game	SPG	Steals per game
BPG	Blocks per game	PPG	Points per game	PIR	Performance index rating
**Bold**	Career high

=== EuroLeague ===
†	Denotes seasons in which Radončić won the EuroLeague

Year	Team	GP	GS	MPG	FG%	3P%	FT%	RPG	APG	SPG	BPG	PPG	PIR
2015–16	Real Madrid	1	0	2.8	.000	—	.500	—	—	—	—	1.0	-1.0
2017–18†	Real Madrid	7	**2**	6.4	.333	.167	—	.4	.1	.1	—	1.0	-0.1
2023–24	Bayern Munich	**16**	0	**9.0**	**.429**	**.333**	**.636**	**2.1**	**.4**	**.3**	**.1**	**1.3**	**1.9**
Career		24	2	8	.375	.222	.615	1.5	.3	.2	.0	1.2	1.2

=== Basketball Champions League ===
Year	Team	GP	GS	MPG	FG%	3P%	FT%	RPG	APG	SPG	BPG	PPG
2018–19	UCAM Murcia	**6**	**1**	**14.2**	**.400**	**.333**	**1.000**	**3.0**	**1.0**	.2	—	**2.5**
2019–20	Canarias	1	0	6.5	—	—	—	1.0	1.0	**1.0**	—	0.0
Career		7	1	13.0	.400	.333	1.000	2.7	1.0	.3	—	2.1

=== FIBA Europe Cup ===
Year	Team	GP	GS	MPG	FG%	3P%	FT%	RPG	APG	SPG	BPG	PPG
2021–22	Zaragoza	5	2	26.9	.533	.273	.567	6.4	.8	1.0	.6	13.6
Career		5	2	26.9	.533	.273	.567	6.4	.8	1.0	.6	13.6

=== Domestic leagues ===
Year	Team	League	GP	MPG	FG%	3P%	FT%	RPG	APG	SPG	BPG	PPG
2015–16	(Spain) Real Madrid	ACB	5	1.5	.000	—	—	—	—	—	—	0.0
2016–17	(Spain) Real Madrid	ACB	1	11.2	.000	.000	.750	3.0	—	—	1.0	3.0
2017–18	(Spain) Real Madrid	ACB	24	11.9	.464	.267	.833	1.6	.7	.2	.1	3.0
2018–19	(Spain) San Pablo Burgos	ACB	14	14.0	.442	.385	.750	2.4	.8	.3	.1	3.7
2018–19	(Spain) UCAM Murcia	ACB	19	16.3	.506	.357	.433	3.1	.7	.3	.2	5.0
2019–20	(Spain) UCAM Murcia	ACB	18	18.8	.425	.348	.533	4.2	.3	.4	—	4.3
2019–20	(Spain) Canarias	ACB	5	12.8	.286	.333	.500	3.0	.6	.8	—	2.0
2020–21	(Spain) Donosti Gipuzkoa	ACB	36	28.1	.446	.245	.729	5.6	1.7	1.1	.3	10.9
2021–22	(Spain) Zaragoza	ACB	34	24.4	.523	.231	.742	4.8	.8	.6	.1	8.3
2022–23	(Spain) Zaragoza	ACB	16	15.9	.490	.000	.556	3.8	.5	.7	.1	4.1
2023–24	(Germany) Bayern Munich II	ProB	12	32.7	.500	.320	.746	8.8	3.5	1.8	.5	16.7
2023–24	(Germany) Bayern Munich	BBL	4	9.6	.750	1.000	1.000	3.7	.2	.5	—	2.5

== See also ==
- List of youngest EuroLeague players
