= Portugal men's national basketball team =

Portugal
- FIBA ranking: 44 ▲1 (1 September 2026)
- Joined FIBA: 1932 (co-founders)
- FIBA zone: FIBA Europe
- National federation: FPB
- Coach: Mário Gomes
- Nickname(s): A Seleção das Quinas (Selection of the Quinas)

FIBA World Cup
- Appearances: None

EuroBasket
- Appearances: 4
- Medals: None
Home	Away

First international
- Portugal 9–32 France (Porto, Portugal; 24 May 1931)

Biggest win
- Portugal 126–43 Macau (São Lázaro, Macau; 13 October 2006)

Biggest defeat
- Hungary 115–46 Portugal (Szombathely, Hungary; 6 May 1973)

The Portugal men's national basketball team (Portuguese: Seleção Portuguesa de Basquetebol) represents Portugal in international basketball competition. The team is controlled by the Portuguese Basketball Federation.

Portugal doesn't have much history on the international stage, although they have qualified for the EuroBasket four times (1951, 2007, 2011, 2025). While Portugal has made multiple appearances at the continental level, they continue their quest to qualify for the global stage at the FIBA World Cup.

== History ==
=== Early years ===
The Portuguese Basketball Federation was founded in 1927, with the national team playing in their first match on 24 May 1931, a 9–32 defeat to France. Portugal would become a co-founder of FIBA in 1932. Three years later, in 1935, Portugal played in the only qualifying game for the first European Basketball Championship. The Portuguese lost the game 33–12 against Spain, which eliminated the team from qualification.

=== EuroBasket 1951 ===
After Portugal's failed attempt to qualify for the European Championship in 1935, and declining to enter the competition multiple times thereafter, Portugal made their debut at the Euros for EuroBasket 1951 in Paris. The national team got off to a lethargic start to begin the tournament, as they lost 35–81 in their first ever match in the event to Greece. In Portugal's final two games of the preliminary round, the team would fall once again to Bulgaria, but would pick up their first official victory in the competition with a walkover win after Romania withdrew. With a record of (1–2), and sitting in third place in the group, Portugal could not progress any further; and was relegated to the classification rounds. In the classification phase, Portugal lost its first two matches against West Germany and Austria, but would pullout a close win over Switzerland 49–52. Finishing with a duplicate record of (1–2) once again, Portugal was sent to the classification play-offs to determine 13th–16th place. The national team would go on to lose their match to Denmark, before turning around to defeat Scotland, to end the event placing 15th overall out of the 18 teams.

=== EuroBasket 2007 ===
At the conclusion of Portugal's first appearance at the European Championship in 1951, the national team would fail to make it back to the competition for the next five decades. However, Portugal would end their drought when they made their second appearance on the continental stage at EuroBasket 2007 (first time through qualification) by finishing first in their group during the qualifiers.

Entering the preliminary round, Portugal's first match of the tournament came against the hosts Spain, where the team suffered a heavy defeat 56–82. After dropping their second game of the competition to Croatia, Portugal earned a crucial victory in their final preliminary phase match against Latvia 77–67. The important win over Latvia ultimately was enough to propel the team into the second round of the tournament for the first time.

Portugal began the second round with a loss against Russia, who eventually went on to become champions of the competition; before picking up a solid victory in their second game of the round versus Israel 94–85. Although with an opportunity to advance to the quarter-finals all but gone, Portugal would easily be defeated by Greece 85–67 in their final game of the event. Nevertheless, the performance displayed by Portugal throughout the tournament was their best showing at the Euros ever to that point; which ensured the national team a top ten finish.

=== EuroBasket 2011 ===
After missing out on qualification for the EuroBasket in 2009, Portugal was successful during the qualifiers for EuroBasket 2011. Portugal was placed into Group A to begin the tournament, where they would meet Turkey in their first match. However, the team was outplayed from start to finish, in a 79–56 loss. At a record of (0–1), Portugal's task of winning their next match would be even tougher, with a date against Spain. Even with a valiant effort put up by the national team, Spain were just too much to overcome in the 73–87 defeat. For Portugal's final three group stage matches, the team was unable to put together an efficient stretch of basketball for a full game, which resulted in three more losses to prevent the team from advancing.

=== EuroBasket 2017 qualification ===
In the attempt for Portugal to reach the European Championship once again, after failed opportunities to qualify in 2013 and 2015; the national team was placed into Group D during the qualifying process. However, Portugal struggled in their first five matches in the qualifiers (0–5), to come away with their only win against Belarus 77–62 before being eliminated.

=== 2019 World Cup qualification ===
During qualification for Portugal to advance toward making their first appearance in the FIBA World Cup, the team first had to make it through European Pre-Qualifiers in order to realize their chance. Unfortunately, the national team was unable to improve on their performance they would display during qualifying for the prior EuroBasket, and would fail to progress further with a record of (1–3).

=== 2020s–present ===
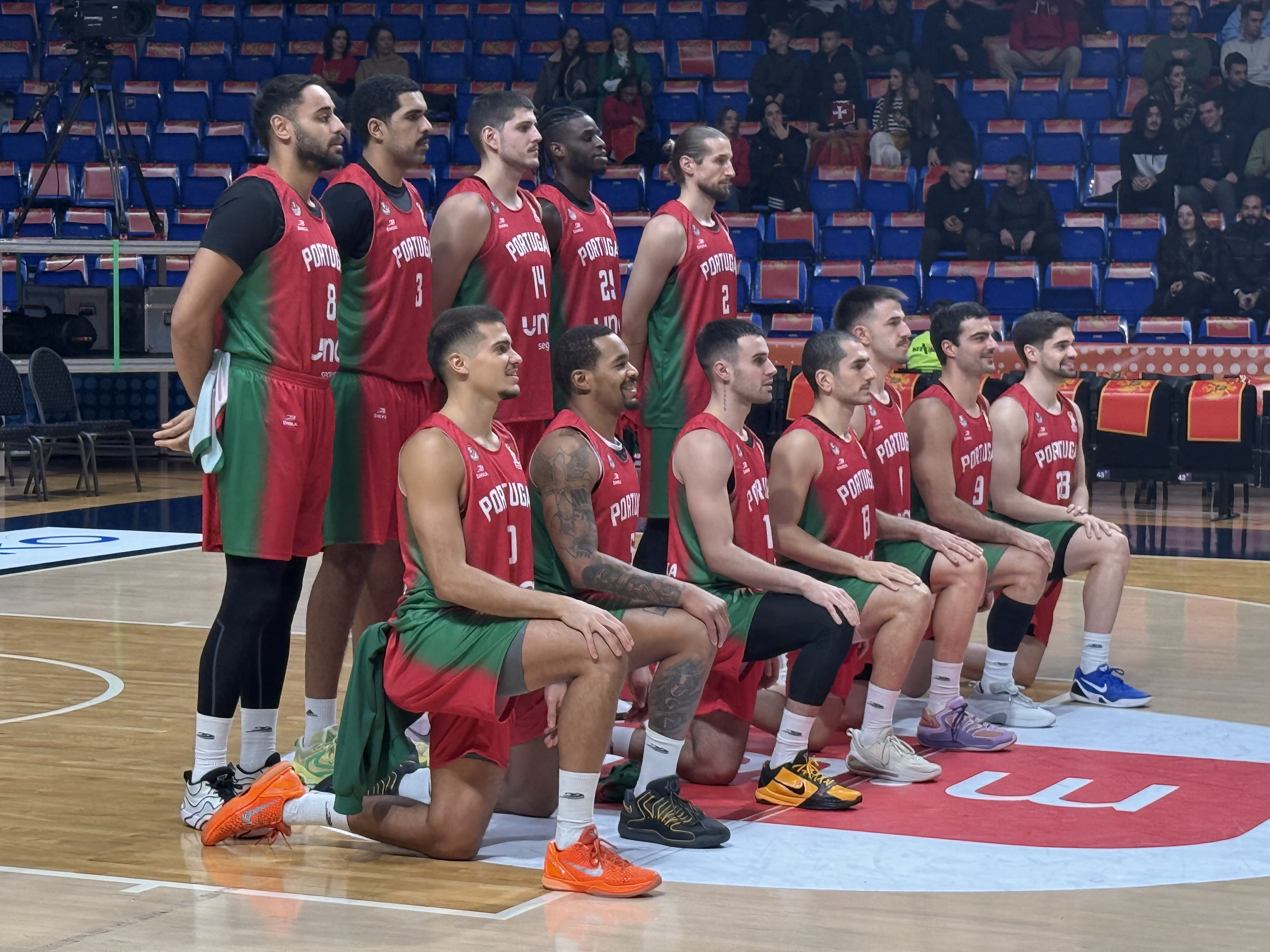
Portugal national team in November 2025 for a 2027 FIBA World Cup qualifier

After Portugal's failure to qualify for the EuroBasket on multiple occasions after their last appearance in 2011, the team began the procedure to try to qualify for EuroBasket 2022. Portugal began their journey with the Pre-Qualifiers, being drawn into Group C for the first round. In their opening game, the team would lose in a narrow contest to Cyprus, before defeating Luxembourg. With two games left to go in the first round, Portugal put away Cyprus in the rematch before cruising past Luxembourg once again to advance into the second phase of pre-qualifiers at (3–1). In the second round, however, Portugal's fortunes would completely be reversed as the team went (1–3) in this phase, to need the third and final round to determine their fate. There, Portugal would only manage to achieve slightly better results at (2–2), but still finished at the bottom of their group again to be eliminated.

== Competitive record ==
=== FIBA World Cup ===
World Cup					Qualification		
Year	Position	Pld	W	L	Pld	W	L
(Argentina) 1950	Did not enter				Did not enter		
(Brazil) 1954	Did not enter				Did not enter		
(Chile) 1959	Did not enter				Did not enter		
(Brazil) 1963	Did not enter				Did not enter		
(Uruguay) 1967	Did not enter				Did not enter		
(Socialist Federal Republic of Yugoslavia) 1970	Did not enter				Did not enter		
(Puerto Rico) 1974	Did not qualify				EuroBasket served as qualifiers		
(Philippines) 1978	Did not qualify				EuroBasket served as qualifiers		
(Colombia) 1982	Did not qualify				EuroBasket served as qualifiers		
(Spain) 1986	Did not enter				Did not enter		
(Argentina) 1990	Did not enter				Did not enter		
(Canada) 1994	Did not qualify				EuroBasket served as qualifiers		
(Greece) 1998	Did not qualify				EuroBasket served as qualifiers		
(United States) 2002	Did not qualify				EuroBasket served as qualifiers		
(Japan) 2006	Did not qualify				EuroBasket served as qualifiers		
(Turkey) 2010	Did not qualify				EuroBasket served as qualifiers		
(Spain) 2014	Did not qualify				EuroBasket served as qualifiers		
(China) 2019	Did not qualify				4	1	3
(Philippines) (Japan) (Indonesia) 2023	Did not qualify				16	8	8
(Qatar) 2027	To be determined				To be determined		
(France) 2031	To be determined				To be determined		
Total	0/19				20	9	11

=== Olympic Games ===
Olympic Games					Qualifying		
Year	Position	Pld	W	L	Pld	W	L
(Nazi Germany) 1936	Did not enter						
(United Kingdom) 1948	Did not enter						
(Finland) 1952	Did not enter						
(Australia) 1956	Did not enter						
(Italy) 1960	Did not enter				Did not enter		
(Japan) 1964	Did not enter				Did not enter		
(Mexico) 1968	Did not enter				Did not enter		
(West Germany) 1972	Did not enter				Did not enter		
(Canada) 1976	Did not enter				Did not enter		
(Soviet Union) 1980	Did not enter				Did not enter		
(United States) 1984	Did not enter				Did not enter		
(South Korea) 1988	Did not enter				Did not enter		
(Spain) 1992	Did not qualify				5	1	4
(United States) 1996	Did not qualify				Did not qualify		
(Australia) 2000	Did not qualify				Did not qualify		
(Greece) 2004	Did not qualify				Did not qualify		
(China) 2008	Did not qualify				Did not qualify		
(United Kingdom) 2012	Did not qualify				Did not qualify		
(Brazil) 2016	Did not qualify				Did not qualify		
(Japan) 2020	Did not qualify				Did not qualify		
(France) 2024	Did not qualify				3	1	2
(United States) 2028	To be determined				To be determined		
Total	0/21				8	2	6

=== Lusofonia Games ===
Lusofonia Games
Year	Position	Pld	W	L
(Macau) 2006	1st place, gold medalist(s)	7	7	0
(Portugal) 2009	3rd place, bronze medalist(s)	4	3	1
Total		11	10	1

=== EuroBasket ===
EuroBasket					Qualification		
Year	Position	Pld	W	L	Pld	W	L
(Switzerland) 1935	Did not qualify				1	0	1
(Latvia) 1937	Did not enter						
(Lithuania) 1939	Did not enter						
(Switzerland) 1946	Did not enter						
(Czechoslovakia) 1947	Did not enter						
(Egypt) 1949	Did not enter						
(France) 1951	15th	8	3	5			
(Soviet Union) 1953	Did not enter						
(Hungary) 1955	Did not enter						
(Bulgaria) 1957	Did not enter						
(Turkey) 1959	Did not enter						
(Socialist Federal Republic of Yugoslavia) 1961	Did not enter						
(Poland) 1963	Did not enter				Did not enter		
(Soviet Union) 1965	Did not enter				Did not enter		
(Finland) 1967	Did not enter				Did not enter		
(Italy) 1969	Did not enter				Did not enter		
(West Germany) 1971	Did not enter				Did not enter		
(Spain) 1973	Did not qualify				7	0	7
(Socialist Federal Republic of Yugoslavia) 1975	Did not enter				Did not enter		
(Belgium) 1977	Did not qualify				5	1	4
(Italy) 1979	Did not qualify				4	2	2
(Czechoslovakia) 1981	Did not qualify				9	5	4
(France) 1983	Did not qualify				5	0	5
(West Germany) 1985	Did not qualify				4	2	2
(Greece) 1987	Did not qualify				4	2	2
(Socialist Federal Republic of Yugoslavia) 1989	Did not enter				Did not enter		
(Italy) 1991	Did not qualify				4	2	2
(Germany) 1993	Did not qualify				10	3	7
(Greece) 1995	Did not qualify				5	2	3
(Spain) 1997	Did not qualify				16	7	9
(France) 1999	Did not qualify				13	5	8
(Turkey) 2001	Did not qualify				15	4	11
(Sweden) 2003	Did not qualify				16	6	10
(Serbia and Montenegro) 2005	Did not qualify				10	3	7
(Spain) 2007	9th	6	2	4	6	4	2
(Poland) 2009	Did not qualify				10	3	7
(Lithuania) 2011	21st	5	0	5	12	3	9
(Slovenia) 2013	Did not qualify				8	0	8
(France) (Croatia) (Germany) (Latvia) 2015	Did not qualify				10	2	8
(Finland) (Israel) (Romania) (Turkey) 2017	Did not qualify				6	1	5
(Czech Republic) (Georgia (country)) (Italy) (Germany) 2022	Did not qualify				12	6	6
(Cyprus) (Finland) (Poland) (Latvia) 2025	15th	6	2	4	12	7	5
(Estonia) (Greece) (Slovenia) (Spain) 2029	To be determined				To be determined		
Total	4/42	25	7	18	204	70	134

== Results and fixtures ==
Win Loss

=== 2025 ===
27 November 2025 2027 FIBA World Cup qualifiers – 1st round	Montenegro	62–83	Portugal	Podgorica, Montenegro
18:00 (UTC+1)	Scoring by quarter: 21–14, 11–25, 11–25, 19–19
	Pts: Simonović 13; Rebs: Hadžibegović 9 Asts: Perry 6	Boxscore	Pts: Williams 16; Rebs: C. Sá 10; Asts: Ventura 5	Arena: Morača Sports Center; Attendance: 2,057; Referees: Gvidas Gedvilas (LTU), Fernando Calatrava (ESP), Tolga Edis (TUR)

30 November 2025 2027 FIBA World Cup qualifiers – 1st round	Portugal	68–76	Greece	Matosinhos, Portugal
17:00 (UTC+0)	Scoring by quarter: 17–24, 19–13, 13–19, 19–20
	Pts: Williams 15; Rebs: C. Sá 8 Asts: Lisboa 4	Boxscore	Pts: Larentzakis 15; Rebs: Karagiannidis 7 Asts: Toliopoulos 5	Arena: Centro de Desportos e Congressos de Matosinhos; Attendance: 1,896; Referees: Wojciech Liszka (POL), Gintaras Mačiulis (LTU), Ritvars Helmšteins (LAT)

=== 2026 ===
27 February 2026 2027 FIBA World Cup qualifiers – 1st round	Portugal	99–82	Romania	Coimbra, Portugal
19:00 (UTC+0)	Scoring by quarter: 25–12, 29–34, 21–15, 24–21
	Pts: Brito 32; Rebs: Williams 8 Asts: Brito 4	Boxscore	Pts: Nicolescu 25; Rebs: Cățe 10; Asts: Russell	Arena: Pavilhão Multidesportos Dr. Mário Mexia; Attendance: 1,828; Referees: Michał Proc (POL), Valentin Oliot (FRA), Mehmet Şahin (TUR)

2 March 2026 2027 FIBA World Cup qualifiers – 1st round	Romania	101–96	Portugal	Pitești, Romania
19:00 (UTC+2)	Scoring by quarter: 27–22, 23–31, 26–20, 25–23
	Pts: Russell 29; Rebs: Cățe 9 Asts: Russell 6	Boxscore	Pts: Williams 33; Rebs: Monteiro 5 Asts: Da Silva, Ventura 4	Arena: Pitești Arena; Attendance: 2,280; Referees: Mihkel Männiste (EST), Josip Jurčević (CRO), Valerio Grigioni (ITA)

2 July 2026 2027 FIBA World Cup qualifiers – 1st round	Portugal	68–72	Montenegro	Matosinhos, Portugal
19:00 (UTC+1)	Scoring by quarter: 13–23, 8–13, 20–13, 27–23
	Pts: Williams 21; Rebs: Queiroz, Relvão 8 Asts: Ventura 4	Boxscore	Pts: Drobnjak 18; Rebs: Hadžibegović 9 Asts: Ferrell 5	Arena: Centro de Desportos e Congressos de Matosinhos; Attendance: 1,612; Referees: Luis Castillo (ESP), Fernando Calatrava (ESP), Polat Parlak (TUR)

5 July 2026 2027 FIBA World Cup qualifiers – 1st round	Greece	56–71	Portugal	Athens, Greece
19:30 (UTC+3)	Scoring by quarter: 15–19, 8–9, 19–25, 14–18
	Pts: Mitrou-Long 11; Rebs: Papanikolaou 7 Asts: Mitrou-Long 4	Boxscore	Pts: Brito 17; Rebs: Brito 9 Asts: Lisboa 5	Arena: SUNEL Arena; Attendance: 8,155; Referees: Ademir Zurapović (BIH), Alberto Sánchez (ESP), Valerio Grigion (ITA)

28 August 2026 2027 FIBA World Cup qualifiers – 2nd round	Spain	89–95	Portugal	Zaragoza, Spain
21:00 (UTC+2)	Scoring by quarter: 14–21, 27–26, 30–24, 18–24
	Pts: Brizuela 19; Rebs: J. Hernangómez 7 Asts: Brizuela 5	Boxscore	Pts: Williams 22; Rebs: Queta 9 Asts: Lisboa 4	Arena: Pabellón Príncipe Felipe; Attendance: 6,103; Referees: Gatis Saliņš (LAT), Juozas Barkauskas (LTU), Mehmet Şahin (TUR)

31 August 2026 2027 FIBA World Cup qualifiers – 2nd round	Portugal	90–98	Georgia	Matosinhos, Portugal
19:00 (UTC+1)	Scoring by quarter: 24–16, 18–25, 24–29, 24–28
	Pts: Queta 20; Rebs: Queta 11; Asts: Lisboa 5	Boxscore	Pts: Shengelia 26; Rebs: Mamukelashvili, Shengelia 6 Asts: Reed 6	Arena: Centro de Desportos e Congressos de Matosinhos; Attendance: 4,158; Referees: Gvidas Gedvilas (LTU), Valentin Oliot (FRA), Dariusz Zapolski (POL)

26 November 2026 2027 FIBA World Cup qualifiers – 2nd round	Portugal	vs.	Ukraine	Matosinhos, Portugal
19:00 (UTC+0)
		Boxscore		Arena: Centro de Desportos e Congressos de Matosinhos

29 November 2026 2027 FIBA World Cup qualifiers – 2nd round	Georgia	vs.	Portugal	Tbilisi, Georgia
19:30 (UTC+4)
		Boxscore		Arena: Tbilisi Arena

=== 2027 ===
26 February 2027 2027 FIBA World Cup qualifiers – 2nd round	Portugal	vs.	Spain	Portugal
--:-- (UTC+0)
		Boxscore

1 March 2027 2027 FIBA World Cup qualifiers – 2nd round	Ukraine	vs.	Portugal	TBD
--:--
		Boxscore

== Team ==
=== Current roster ===
Roster for the 2027 FIBA World Cup Qualifiers matches on 28 and 31 August 2026 against Spain and Georgia.

Portugal men's national basketball team roster
Players
Coaches

Pos.	No.	Name	Age – Date of birth	Height	Club	Ctr.
SG	0	Diogo Brito	29 – 24 April 1997	1.95 m (6 ft 5 in)	Obradoiro	(Spain)
C	3	Ricardo Monteiro	29 – 13 February 1997	2.08 m (6 ft 10 in)	Braga	(Portugal)
SF	5	Travante Williams	33 – 29 July 1993	1.97 m (6 ft 6 in)	Chorale Roanne	(France)
G/F	6	Francisco Amarante	26 – 24 March 2000	1.95 m (6 ft 5 in)	Sporting CP	(Portugal)
G	9	Diogo Ventura	32 – 24 June 1994	1.95 m (6 ft 5 in)	Sporting CP	(Portugal)
PF	11	Miguel Queiroz (C)	35 – 4 July 1991	2.04 m (6 ft 8 in)	Porto	(Portugal)
SF	12	André Cruz	24 – 23 April 2002	2.01 m (6 ft 7 in)	Sporting CP	(Portugal)
C	14	Daniel Relvão	30 – 26 June 1996	2.08 m (6 ft 10 in)	Benfica	(Portugal)
PG	17	Anthony da Silva	25 – 26 May 2001	1.87 m (6 ft 2 in)	UJAP Quimper	(France)
PG	28	Rafael Lisboa	26 – 27 November 1999	1.82 m (6 ft 0 in)	Lucentum	(Spain)
PF	34	Rúben Prey	21 – 16 February 2005	2.08 m (6 ft 10 in)	St. John's Red Storm	(United States)
C	88	Neemias Queta	27 – 13 July 1999	2.11 m (6 ft 11 in)	Boston Celtics	(United States)

Head coach

- (Portugal) Mário Gomes

Assistant coach(es)

- (Portugal) Nuno Manarte
- (Portugal) Sérgio Ramos

Legend

- (C) Team captain
- Club – describes last
  club before the competition
- Age – describes age
  on 28 August 2026

=== Depth chart ===
Pos.	Starting 5	Bench 1	Bench 2
C	Neemias Queta	Ricardo Monteiro
PF	Rúben Prey	Daniel Relvão	Miguel Queiroz
SF	Travante Williams	André Cruz
SG	Diogo Brito	Francisco Amarante
PG	Rafael Lisboa	Diogo Ventura	Anthony da Silva

== Head coach position ==
- (Portugal) Luís Magalhães – (1999)
- (Ukraine) Valentin Melnychuk – (2000–2007)
- (Spain) Moncho Lopez – (2008–2010)
- (Portugal) Mário Palma – (2011–2013)
- (Portugal) Ricardo Vasconcelos – (2014)
- (Portugal) Mário Palma – (2015–2016)
- (Portugal) Mário Gomes – (2016–present)

== Notable players ==
- Tó Ferreira
- João Gomes
- Carlos Lisboa
- Nuno Marçal
- Pedro Miguel
- Pedro Nuno
- Rui Pinheiro
- Mike Plowden
- Sérgio Ramos
- Steve Rocha

== Past rosters ==
1951 EuroBasket: finished 15th among 18 teams

3 Mário Almeida, 4 Bernardo Leite, 5 Rui Duarte, 6 Avelino Carmo, 7 Máximo Couto, 8 Lenine Santos, 9 José Oliveira,
10 Antonio Cardoso, 11 César Cardoso, 12 Domingos Diogo, 14 José Almeida, 15 João Coutinho (Coach: Fernando Amaral)

2007 EuroBasket: finished 9th among 16 teams

4 Miguel Minhava, 5 Mário Gil Fernandes, 6 Sérgio Ramos, 7 Paulo Cunha, 8 Francisco Jordão, 9 Filipe da Silva, 10 João Gomes,
11 Jorge Coelho, 12 Paulo Simão, 13 Elvis Évora, 14 Miguel Miranda 15 João Santos (Coach: Valentin Melnychuk)

2011 EuroBasket: finished 21st among 24 teams

4 António Tavares, 5 José Costa, 6 Miguel Minhava, 7 Fernando Sousa, 8 Cláudio Fonseca, 9 Filipe da Silva, 10 Carlos Andrade,
11 José Silva, 12 Elvis Évora, 13 Marco Goncalves, 14 Miguel Miranda, 15 João Santos (Coach: Mário Palma)

2025 EuroBasket: finished 15th among 24 teams

0 Diogo Brito, 2 Vladyslav Voytso, 5 Travante Williams, 6 Francisco Amarante, 9 Diogo Ventura, 11 Miguel Queiroz (C),
13 Diogo Gameiro, 14 Daniel Relvão, 25 Nuno Sá, 28 Rafael Lisboa, 29 Cândido Sá, 88 Neemias Queta (Coach: Mário Gomes)

== Kit ==
=== Manufacturer ===
- 2012: Reebok
- 2020–present: Dhika

=== Sponsor ===
- 2012: Banco Montepio

== See also ==
- Sport in Portugal
- Portugal women's national basketball team
- Portugal men's national under-20 basketball team
- Portugal men's national under-18 basketball team
- Portugal men's national under-16 basketball team
