= Diogo Brito =

Portuguese basketball player

No. 24 – Obradoiro CAB
- Positions: Shooting guard, small forward
- League: Primera FEB

Personal information
- Born: 24 April 1997 (age 29) Póvoa de Varzim, Portugal
- Listed height: 1.95 m (6 ft 5 in)

Career information
- College: Utah State (2016–2020)
- Playing career: 2020–present

Career history
- 2020–2021: Ourense
- 2021–2022: Starlabs Morón
- 2022–2024: Força Lleida CE
- 2024–2025: Ourense
- 2025–present: Obradoiro CAB

Diogo Emanuel de Sousa Anjo Brito (born 24 April 1997) is a Portuguese professional basketball player who plays for Obradoiro CAB of the Spanish Primera FEB and the Portuguese national team. He was born in Póvoa de Varzim and started playing basketball at Clube Desportivo da Póvoa.

== Professional career ==
After finishing his college career with the Utah State Aggies in the Mountain West Conference, Brito began his professional career in Spain in 2020.

He first joined Club Ourense Baloncesto in the LEB Oro, followed by a season with CB Morón in LEB Plata. He later played two seasons for Força Lleida CE, contributing to the club's promotion push. In 2024, he returned to Ourense before signing with Obradoiro CAB in July 2025, competing in Spain's Primera FEB.

== National team ==
Brito has represented the Portuguese national team since 2021.

In February 2025, he described his participation at EuroBasket 2025 as a “career goal,” saying that playing in the tournament was something “any player wishes to experience at least once.”

He made his EuroBasket debut in August 2025, helping Portugal to a historic opening victory in the competition.
