= Vladimir Mihailović =

Montenegrin basketball player

No. 1 – Zadar
- Position: Guard
- League: Croatian League; ABA League

Personal information
- Born: August 10, 1990 (age 36) Cetinje, SR Montenegro, SFR Yugoslavia
- Listed height: 1.95 m (6 ft 5 in)
- Listed weight: 93 kg (205 lb)

Career information
- NBA draft: 2012: undrafted
- Playing career: 2008–present

Career history
- 2008–2010: Mornar
- 2010–2014: Budućnost
- 2014: Oostende
- 2014–2016: Tigers Tübingen
- 2016: s.Oliver Würzburg
- 2016–2017: EWE Baskets Oldenburg
- 2017–2018: Oostende
- 2018: Anwil Włocławek
- 2018–2019: Tsmoki-Minsk
- 2019–2021: Okapi Aalst
- 2021–2023: Mornar
- 2023–2024: Budućnost
- 2024–present: Zadar

Career highlights
- 4× Montenegrin League champion (2011–2014); Belgian League champion (2018); Croatian League champion (2025); 3× Montenegrin Cup winner (2011, 2012, 2014); Belgian Cup winner (2018); Belgian League MVP (2021); Belgian League scoring champion (2021); Croatian League Finals MVP (2025)

Vladimir Mihailović (Montenegrin: Владимир Михаиловић; born August 10, 1990) is a Montenegrin professional basketball player for Zadar of the Croatian League and the ABA League. Standing at 1.95 m (6 ft 5 in), he plays as a guard.

== Career ==
Mihailović started his career in Mornar Bar before moving to Montenegrin basketball giants Budućnost Podgorica in 2010 where he stayed until 2014.

On 11 August 2014, Mihailović signed with Oostende of the Belgian League. On 14 November 2014, he signed with the German club WALTER Tigers Tübingen.

On 3 June 2016, Mihailović signed a one-year deal with s.Oliver Baskets. On 15 December 2016, he left s.Oliver and signed with EWE Baskets Oldenburg for the rest of the season.

On 13 October 2017, Mihailović signed a short-term deal with his former club Oostende. On 27 December 2017, his contract was extended for the rest of the season.

In June 2019, Mihailović signed with Okapi Aalstar. He was named the PBL Most Valuable Player of the 2020–21 season. He averaged a league-leading 19.3 points, 4.2 rebounds and 3.8 assists over 29 games.

In August 2021, Mihailović signed with his former club Mornar Bar.

== Montenegrin national team ==
Mihailović has been a member of Montenegrin national basketball team.
