= Rafael Lisboa =

Portuguese professional basketball player

No. 28 – Club Ourense Baloncesto
- Position: Point guard
- League: Primera FEB

Personal information
- Born: 5 April 1999 (age 27) Lisbon, Portugal
- Listed height: 184 cm (6 ft 0 in)

Career information
- Playing career: 2016–present

Career history
- 2016–2021: Benfica
- 2021–2023: Spirou Charleroi
- 2023–2024: CD Estela
- 2024–present: Club Ourense Baloncesto

Rafael Lisboa (born 5 April 1999 in Lisbon) is a Portuguese professional basketball player who plays as a point guard for Ourense of the Primera FEB. He has represented the Portugal national team.

== Club career ==
Lisboa began his professional career in 2016 with the senior side of Benfica, developing through their youth ranks.

He subsequently transferred abroad to Belgium, signing with Spirou Charleroi in 2021. Reflecting on his time there, Lisboa described it as “a very enriching experience,” emphasizing the elevated pace and intensity of play compared to Portugal.

In 2023, Lisboa returned to Benfica, where he has since resumed competing in both domestic league and cup competitions.

In July 2024, he signed for Ourense of the Primera FEB.

== International career ==
Lisboa has represented the Portugal men's national team in competitions such as the FIBA EuroBasket 2025 Qualifiers and other FIBA window events.
