= Diogo Ventura =

Portuguese basketball player (born 1994)

No. 9 – Sporting CP
- Position: Point guard
- League: Portuguese Basketball League

Personal information
- Born: 24 June 1994 (age 32) Almada, Portugal
- Listed height: 1.94 m (6 ft 4 in)
- Listed weight: 82 kg (181 lb)

Career history
- 2013-2015: Algés
- 2014-2015: Sampaense
- 2015-2016: CAB Madeira
- 2016-2017: Eléctrico
- 2017-2019: Galitos
- 2019-: Sporting CP

Diogo Costa Ventura (born 24 June 1994) is a Portuguese professional basketball player who plays for Sporting CP and for the Portuguese National Team.
