= Cândido Sá =

Portuguese basketball player (born 1992)

No. 7 – Portimonense S.C.
- Position: Center
- League: Portuguese Basketball League

Personal information
- Born: 7 November 1992 (age 34) Lisbon, Portugal
- Listed height: 2.06 m (6 ft 9 in)
- Listed weight: 103 kg (227 lb)

Career history
- 2011–2013: SL Benfica
- 2019–2022: Sporting CP
- 2022–2023: Ovarense
- 2023-present: Portimonense S.C.

Cândido Cá e Sá (born 7 November 1992) is a Portuguese professional basketball player for Portimonense S.C..

He played in the United States between 2014 and 2016 for San Jac Ravens and between 2016 and 2018 for Rutgers Scarlet Knights. Went back to Portugal to play for the basketball section of Sporting CP.

== Personal life ==
Born in Portugal, Sá is of Bissau-Guinean descent.
