= 2023 FIBA Basketball World Cup qualification (Europe) – Qualifiers =

The article describes the European qualifiers for the 2023 FIBA Basketball World Cup.

== First round ==
The 24 national teams that qualified for EuroBasket 2022 automatically qualified for this stage. They were joined by eight teams qualified through the pre-qualifiers. In total, 32 teams were divided into eight home-and-away round robin groups of four teams.

Games were played in 2021 and 2022. The bottom team from each group was eliminated. After the 2022 Russian invasion of Ukraine, both Russia and Belarus were expelled from the qualifiers with all results being annulled.

=== Draw ===
The draw for the first round was held on 31 August 2021 in Mies, Switzerland.

==== Seeding ====
Seedings were announced on 30 August 2021. Teams were seeded based on FIBA rankings. Teams from pots 1, 4, 5, and 8 were drawn to Groups A, C, E, and G. Teams from pots 2, 3, 6, and 7 were drawn to Groups B, D, F, and H.

Pot 1
Team	Pos
Spain	2
Slovenia	4
France	5
Serbia	6

Pot 2
Team	Pos
Italy	8
Lithuania	9
Greece	10
Germany	11

Pot 3
Team	Pos
Czech Republic	12
Poland	13
Russia	14
Turkey	16

Pot 4
Team	Pos
Croatia	21
Montenegro	26
Latvia	27
Ukraine	32

Pot 5
Team	Pos
Finland	34
Georgia	37
Belgium	38
Hungary	41

Pot 6
Team	Pos
Great Britain	42
Israel	43
Bosnia and Herzegovina	44
Netherlands	45

Pot 7
Team	Pos
Iceland	47
Estonia	49
Bulgaria	50
Belarus	51

Pot 8
Team	Pos
North Macedonia	53
Sweden	57
Portugal	58
Slovakia	65

=== Group A ===
Pos	Team	Pld	W	L	PF	PA	PD	Pts	Qualification
1	Latvia	6	5	1	475	422	+53	11	Second round (Group I)
2	Belgium	6	4	2	460	392	+68	10	Second round (Group I)
3	Serbia	6	3	3	448	439	+9	9	Second round (Group I)
4	Slovakia	6	0	6	376	506	−130	6	

Source: FIBA
Rules for classification: 1) Points; 2) Head-to-head results; 3) Points difference; 4) Points scored.

25 November 2021	Slovakia	57–83	Belgium	Levice
18:00	Scoring by quarter: 11–15, 24–21, 11–25, 11–22
	Pts: Brodziansky, Krajčovič 18; Rebs: Brodziansky 8 Asts: three players 3	Boxscore	Pts: Libert 17; Rebs: Mwema, Van Vliet 6 Asts: Obasohan 6	Arena: Športová hala Levice; Attendance: 0 Referees: Yener Yılmaz (TUR), Carsten Straube (GER), Ventsislav Velikov (BUL)
Note:

25 November 2021	Serbia	101–100	Latvia	Belgrade
20:00	Scoring by quarter: 28–33, 24–23, 25–19, 24–25
	Pts: Teodosić 21; Rebs: Dangubić 6 Asts: Teodosić 9	Boxscore	Pts: Lomažs 33; Rebs: three players 3 Asts: Zoriks 5	Arena: Aleksandar Nikolić Hall; Attendance: 2,056; Referees: Marius Ciulin (ROU), Nicolás Maestre (FRA), Mehmet Şahin (TUR)
Note:

28 November 2021	Belgium	73–69	Serbia	Mons
15:30	Scoring by quarter: 13–21, 16–20, 25–22, 19–6
	Pts: Van Rossom 20; Rebs: Bako 11; Asts: Bako 5	Boxscore	Pts: Avramović 19; Rebs: Dangubić, Ristić 6 Asts: Teodosić 8	Arena: Mons.Arena; Attendance: 2,242; Referees: Antonio Conde (ESP), Andrei Sharapa (BLR), Lorenzo Baldini (ITA)
Note:

29 November 2021	Latvia	82–74	Slovakia	Riga
19:00	Scoring by quarter: 18–11, 17–23, 21–20, 26–20
	Pts: Lomažs 28; Rebs: Ate, Gražulis 7 Asts: Zoriks 6	Boxscore	Pts: Brodziansky 21; Rebs: Brodziansky, Krajčovič 6 Asts: Ihring 6	Arena: Arena Riga; Attendance: 500; Referees: Saverio Lanzarini (ITA), Michał Proc (POL), Josip Jurčević (CRO)
Note:

25 February 2022	Serbia	75–63	Slovakia	Belgrade
20:30	Scoring by quarter: 24–18, 20–18, 18–18, 13–9
	Pts: Avramović 14; Rebs: Ristić 8 Asts: Novak 4	Boxscore	Pts: Brodziansky 23; Rebs: Fusek 10; Asts: three players 4	Arena: Aleksandar Nikolić Hall; Attendance: 3,150; Referees: Zafer Yılmaz (TUR), Thomas Bissuel (FRA), Mehmet Sahin (TUR)
Note:

25 February 2022	Belgium	65–66	Latvia	Mons
20:30	Scoring by quarter: 10–23, 15–20, 20–14, 20–9
	Pts: Obasohan 18; Rebs: Vanwijn 10; Asts: Obasohan, Schwartz 2	Boxscore	Pts: Bertāns 13; Rebs: Bertāns, Strautiņš 6 Asts: Lomažs 5	Arena: Mons.Arena; Attendance: 2,650; Referees: Manuel Mazzoni (ITA), Igor Mitrovski (MKD), Gintaras Mačiulis (LTU)
Note:

28 February 2022	Latvia	68–63	Belgium	Riga
19:30	Scoring by quarter: 21–16, 18–17, 12–16, 17–14
	Pts: Lomažs 16; Rebs: four players 5 Asts: Lomažs 5	Boxscore	Pts: Obasohan 16; Rebs: Mwema 6 Asts: Lecomte, Van Vliet 3	Arena: Arena Riga; Attendance: 6,700; Referees: Ademir Zurapović (BIH), Kerem Baki (TUR), Paulo Marques (POR)
Note:

28 February 2022	Slovakia	63–71	Serbia	Levice
18:00	Scoring by quarter: 16–26, 15–18, 22–16, 10–11
	Pts: Brodziansky 22; Rebs: Brodziansky 8 Asts: Dolezaj, Krajčovič 4	Boxscore	Pts: Avramović 24; Rebs: Ristić 8 Asts: Avramović 6	Arena: Športová hala Levice; Attendance: 1,100; Referees: Wojciech Liszka (POL), Gvidas Gedvilas (LTU), Dariusz Zapolski (POL)
Note:

30 June 2022	Latvia	66–59	Serbia	Riga
19:30	Scoring by quarter: 13–12, 12–19, 21–7, 20–21
	Pts: Kurucs 13; Rebs: three players 5 Asts: Kurucs, Lomažs 6	Boxscore	Pts: Avramović 16; Rebs: Petrušev 10; Asts: three players 3	Arena: Arena Riga; Attendance: 10,065; Referees: Antonio Conde (ESP), Lorenzo Baldini (ITA), Ventsislav Velikov (BUL)
Note:

30 June 2022	Belgium	102–59	Slovakia	Mons
20:30	Scoring by quarter: 25–7, 31–22, 27–12, 19–18
	Pts: Obasohan 18; Rebs: four players 6 Asts: Lecomte 11	Boxscore	Pts: Abrhám 15; Rebs: Bojanovský 7 Asts: Hlivák 6	Arena: Mons.Arena; Attendance: 1,210; Referees: Boris Krejić (SLO), Radomir Vojinović (MNE), Martin Horozov (BUL)
Note:

3 July 2022	Slovakia	60–93	Latvia	Levice
18:00	Scoring by quarter: 10–26, 13–25, 23–19, 14–23
	Pts: Pavelka 11; Rebs: Bolek 8 Asts: Hlivák 4	Boxscore	Pts: Dav. Bertāns 23; Rebs: Cavars 15; Asts: Lomažs 6	Arena: Športová hala Levice; Attendance: 800; Referees: Erez Gurion (ISR), Carsten Straube (GER), Josip Jurčević (CRO)
Note:

4 July 2022	Serbia	73–74	Belgium	Niš
19:00	Scoring by quarter: 21–23, 17–15, 22–15, 13–21
	Pts: Marinković 14; Rebs: Marjanović 10; Asts: Jaramaz 4	Boxscore	Pts: Bako 17; Rebs: Bako 6 Asts: Obasohan 6	Arena: Čair Sports Center; Attendance: 4,800; Referees: Yohan Rosso (FRA), Thomas Bissuel (FRA), Péter Praksch (HUN)
Note: The game, originally scheduled for 3 July 2022, was postponed due to a lighting issue with just three minutes played and Belgium leading 6 to 3. The remainder of the match was played on 4 July 2022.

=== Group B ===
Pos	Team	Pld	W	L	PF	PA	PD	Pts	Qualification
1	Greece	4	3	1	310	287	+23	7	Second round (Group I)
2	Turkey	4	2	2	307	286	+21	6	Second round (Group I)
3	Great Britain	4	1	3	287	331	−44	5	Second round (Group I)
4	Belarus (Note: Belarus was expelled, after beating Turkey 84–70 and losing against Greece 77–67.)	0	0	0	0	0	0	0	Expelled

Source: FIBA
Rules for classification: 1) Points; 2) Head-to-head results; 3) Points difference; 4) Points scored.
Notes:

25 November 2021	Great Britain	78–69	Greece	Newcastle
18:30	Scoring by quarter: 23–23, 10–15, 23–19, 22–12
	Pts: Okereafor 19; Rebs: Nelson 7 Asts: Nelson 6	Boxscore	Pts: Agravanis 19; Rebs: Rogkavopoulos 9 Asts: Mouratos 6	Arena: Vertu Motors Arena; Attendance: 2,600; Referees: Antonio Conde (ESP), Saverio Lanzarini (ITA), Andris Aunkrogers (LAT)
Note:

25 November 2021	Belarus	Annulled	Turkey
Note:

28 November 2021	Greece	Annulled	Belarus
Note:

28 November 2021	Turkey	84–67	Great Britain	Istanbul
19:00	Scoring by quarter: 16–23, 21–14, 23–17, 24–13
	Pts: Larkin 22; Rebs: Birsen 12; Asts: Tuncer 12	Boxscore	Pts: Clark 17; Rebs: Olaseni 9 Asts: Phillip 7	Arena: Sinan Erdem Dome; Attendance: 7,423; Referees: Ademir Zurapović (BIH), Martin Horozov (BUL), Zdravko Rutešić (MNE)
Note:

25 February 2022	Belarus	Cancelled	Great Britain
Note: The game, originally scheduled for 25 February 2022, was postponed due to the Russian invasion of Ukraine.

25 February 2022	Greece	72–71	Turkey	Athens
18:00	Scoring by quarter: 13–20, 27–12, 20–24, 12–15
	Pts: Agravanis, Papagiannis 14; Rebs: Agravanis 6 Asts: Sloukas 7	Boxscore	Pts: Mahmutoğlu 21; Rebs: Larkin 5 Asts: Larkin 9	Arena: Ano Liosia Olympic Hall; Attendance: 4,000; Referees: Antonio Conde (ESP), Tomas Jasevičius (LTU), Andris Aunkrogers (LAT)
Note:

28 February 2022	Turkey	67–76	Greece	Istanbul
20:00	Scoring by quarter: 15–17, 18–19, 13–26, 21–14
	Pts: Larkin 16; Rebs: Birsen 13; Asts: Larkin 6	Boxscore	Pts: Agravanis 22; Rebs: Agravanis 11; Asts: Sloukas 9	Arena: Sinan Erdem Dome; Attendance: 14,500; Referees: Yohan Rosso (FRA), Aleksandar Glišić (SRB), Lorenzo Baldini (ITA)
Note:

28 February 2022	Great Britain	Cancelled	Belarus
Note: The game, originally scheduled for 28 February 2022, was postponed due to the Russian invasion of Ukraine.

30 June 2022	Turkey	Cancelled	Belarus
Note:

30 June 2022	Greece	93–71	Great Britain	Larissa
20:00	Scoring by quarter: 19–20, 20–18, 30–10, 24–23
	Pts: Agravanis 16; Rebs: Papagiannis 10; Asts: Dorsey 7	Boxscore	Pts: Hesson 23; Rebs: Olaseni 8 Asts: Van Oostrum 5	Arena: Larissa Neapolis Indoor Arena; Attendance: 4,120; Referees: Ademir Zurapović (BIH), Paulo Marques (POR), Zdravko Rutešić (MNE)
Note:

3 July 2022	Belarus	Cancelled	Greece
Note:

3 July 2022	Great Britain	71–85	Turkey	Newcastle
16:00	Scoring by quarter: 18–20, 13–22, 20–20, 20–23
	Pts: Hesson 18; Rebs: Hesson 10; Asts: Hesson, Van Oostrum 5	Boxscore	Pts: Larkin 22; Rebs: Tuncer 7 Asts: Hazer, Larkin 6	Arena: Vertu Motors Arena; Attendance: 2,300; Referees: Manuel Mazzoni (ITA), Gvidas Gedvilas (LTU), Ivor Matějek (CZE)

=== Group C ===
Pos	Team	Pld	W	L	PF	PA	PD	Pts	Qualification
1	Finland	6	5	1	474	446	+28	11	Second round (Group J)
2	Slovenia	6	4	2	506	482	+24	10	Second round (Group J)
3	Sweden	6	2	4	479	494	−15	8	Second round (Group J)
4	Croatia	6	1	5	462	499	−37	7	

Source: FIBA
Rules for classification: 1) Points; 2) Head-to-head results; 3) Points difference; 4) Points scored.

25 November 2021	Sweden	72–62	Finland	Stockholm
20:00	Scoring by quarter: 14–11, 17–8, 16–14, 25–29
	Pts: Håkanson 20; Rebs: Gaddefors 10; Asts: Håkanson 10	Boxscore	Pts: Salin 12; Rebs: Jantunen, Salin 8 Asts: Seppälä 3	Arena: Avicii Arena; Attendance: 10,218; Referees: Oskars Lūcis (LAT), Zdravko Rutešić (MNE), Beniamino Attard (ITA)
Note:

25 November 2021	Croatia	74–76	Slovenia	Zagreb
20:45	Scoring by quarter: 19–16, 20–25, 17–14, 18–21
	Pts: Bundović 16; Rebs: Bundović 7 Asts: Bundović, Gnjidić 5	Boxscore	Pts: Prepelič 16; Rebs: Murić 10; Asts: Nikolić 3	Arena: Dražen Petrović Basketball Hall; Attendance: 2,200; Referees: Yohan Rosso (FRA), Fernando Calatrava (ESP), Mārtiņš Kozlovskis (LAT)
Note:

28 November 2021	Finland	77–71	Croatia	Espoo
19:00	Scoring by quarter: 14–15, 20–19, 25–21, 18–16
	Pts: Maxhuni 15; Rebs: Huff 9 Asts: Koponen, Maxhuni 5	Boxscore	Pts: Bundović 16; Rebs: Gnjidić 7 Asts: Prkačin 5	Arena: Espoo Metro Areena; Attendance: 5,140; Referees: Nicolás Maestre (FRA), Zafer Yılmaz (TUR), Gatis Saliņš (LAT)
Note:

28 November 2021	Slovenia	94–89	Sweden	Koper
20:00	Scoring by quarter: 17–24, 25–20, 25–19, 27–26
	Pts: Prepelič 30; Rebs: Blažič 9 Asts: Prepelič 8	Boxscore	Pts: Håkanson 21; Rebs: Czerapowicz 11; Asts: Håkanson 14	Arena: Arena Bonifika; Attendance: 1,600; Referees: Yener Yılmaz (TUR), Thomas Bissuel (FRA), Tanel Suslov (EST)
Note:

25 February 2022	Finland	86–76	Slovenia	Espoo
18:30	Scoring by quarter: 13–14, 19–17, 26–26, 28–19
	Pts: Salin 25; Rebs: Jantunen 11; Asts: Little, Seppälä 6	Boxscore	Pts: Dragić 25; Rebs: Tobey 10; Asts: Rebec 5	Arena: Espoo Metro Areena; Attendance: 5,245; Referees: Wojciech Liszka (POL), Paulo Marques (POR), Tanel Suslov (EST)
Note:

25 February 2022	Croatia	64–70	Sweden	Zagreb
18:30	Scoring by quarter: 15–18, 20–17, 10–17, 19–18
	Pts: Zubčić 20; Rebs: Krušlin 6 Asts: Gnjidić, Krušlin 2	Boxscore	Pts: Gaddefors 16; Rebs: Birgander 12; Asts: Håkanson 6	Arena: Dražen Petrović Basketball Hall; Attendance: 2,000; Referees: Georgios Poursanidis (GRE), Marius Ciulin (ROU), Martin Horozov (BUL)
Note:

28 February 2022	Slovenia	79–83	Finland	Koper
17:30	Scoring by quarter: 16–26, 15–26, 18–12, 30–19
	Pts: Prepelič 20; Rebs: Murić 12; Asts: Samar, Tobey 5	Boxscore	Pts: Jantunen 17; Rebs: Huff 8 Asts: Valtonen 4	Arena: Arena Bonifika; Attendance: 3,000; Referees: Antonio Conde (ESP), Marek Kúkelčík (SVK), Gintaras Vitkauskas (LTU)
Note:

28 February 2022	Sweden	98–105(2OT)	Croatia	Norrköping
19:00	Scoring by quarter: 21–14, 20–12, 18–24, 20–29, Overtime: 9–9, 10–17
	Pts: Håkanson 31; Rebs: Birgander 18; Asts: Håkanson 7	Boxscore	Pts: Filipović 29; Rebs: Matković 13; Asts: Krušlin 6	Arena: Stadium Arena; Attendance: 2,683; Referees: Manuel Mazzoni (ITA), Tomas Jasevicius (LTU), Thomas Bissuel (FRA)
Note:

30 June 2022	Finland	85–69	Sweden	Espoo
18:30	Scoring by quarter: 19–29, 24–17, 26–8, 16–15
	Pts: Markkanen 22; Rebs: Markkanen 11; Asts: Maxhuni 5	Boxscore	Pts: Andersson 18; Rebs: Birgander 8 Asts: Birgander 6	Arena: Espoo Metro Areena; Attendance: 6,951; Referees: Aleksandar Glišić (SRB), Gvidas Gedvilas (LTU), Beniamino Attard (ITA)
Note:

30 June 2022	Slovenia	97–69	Croatia	Ljubljana
20:15	Scoring by quarter: 33–8, 21–27, 22–16, 21–18
	Pts: Dončić 21; Rebs: Tobey 13; Asts: Dončić 10	Boxscore	Pts: Hezonja 22; Rebs: Hezonja 9 Asts: Hezonja 6	Arena: Arena Stožice; Attendance: 13,000; Referees: Yohan Rosso (FRA), Luis Castillo (ESP), Michał Proc (POL)
Note:

3 July 2022	Sweden	81–84	Slovenia	Stockholm
17:00	Scoring by quarter: 17–22, 24–19, 20–29, 20–14
	Pts: Håkanson 24; Rebs: Gaddefors 9 Asts: Håkanson 9	Boxscore	Pts: Dončić 31; Rebs: Dončić 10; Asts: Dončić 6	Arena: Hovet; Attendance: 8,599; Referees: Oskars Lūcis (LAT), Paulo Marques (POR), Geert Jacobs (BEL)
Note:

3 July 2022	Croatia	79–81	Finland	Rijeka
20:00	Scoring by quarter: 17–21, 17–22, 27–17, 18–21
	Pts: Bogdanović, Zubac 21; Rebs: Prkačin 9 Asts: three players 4	Boxscore	Pts: Markkanen 19; Rebs: Valtonen 9 Asts: Maxhuni 5	Arena: Centar Zamet; Attendance: 2,500; Referees: Yener Yılmaz (TUR), Martin Horozov (BUL), Fernando Calatrava (ESP)

=== Group D ===
Pos	Team	Pld	W	L	PF	PA	PD	Pts	Qualification
1	Germany	6	5	1	474	425	+49	11	Second round (Group J)
2	Israel	6	3	3	476	452	+24	9	Second round (Group J)
3	Estonia	6	2	4	415	470	−55	8 (Note: Estonia 143–141 Poland)	Second round (Group J)
4	Poland	6	2	4	444	462	−18	8	

Source: FIBA
Rules for classification: 1) Points; 2) Head-to-head results; 3) Points difference; 4) Points scored.
Notes:

25 November 2021	Israel	69–61	Poland	Tel Aviv
19:00	Scoring by quarter: 12–21, 19–6, 18–12, 20–22
	Pts: three players 11; Rebs: Ginat 11; Asts: Madar, Pnini 5	Boxscore	Pts: Kolenda 16; Rebs: Balcerowski 7 Asts: Ponitka, Schenk 5	Arena: Drive in Arena; Attendance: 3,500; Referees: Georgios Poursanidis (GRE), Gatis Saliņš (LAT), Ilias Kounelles (CYP)
Note:

25 November 2021	Germany	66–69	Estonia	Nuremberg
19:00	Scoring by quarter: 18–17, 16–13, 19–25, 13–14
	Pts: Sengfelder 21; Rebs: Sengfelder 8 Asts: Benzing, Hollatz 3	Boxscore	Pts: Kullamäe, Vene 15; Rebs: Nurger 6 Asts: Kullamäe 7	Arena: KIA Metropol Arena; Attendance: 900; Referees: Boris Krejić (SLO), Andrei Sharapa (BLR), Geert Jacobs (BEL)
Note:

28 November 2021	Estonia	69–79	Israel	Tallinn
19:00	Scoring by quarter: 14–20, 22–19, 17–22, 16–18
	Pts: Jurkatamm 14; Rebs: Drell, Treier 5 Asts: Kullamäe, Vene 4	Boxscore	Pts: four players 10; Rebs: Levi 11; Asts: Mekel 10	Arena: Saku Suurhall; Attendance: 2,532; Referees: Luis Castillo (ESP), Andris Aunkrogers (LAT), Mehmet Sahin (TUR)
Note:

28 November 2021	Poland	69–72	Germany	Lublin
20:00	Scoring by quarter: 13–16, 17–24, 21–21, 18–11
	Pts: Schenk 17; Rebs: Balcerowski, Kolenda 6 Asts: Schenk 7	Boxscore	Pts: Kramer 24; Rebs: Kratzer, Lockhart 7 Asts: Hollatz 7	Arena: Globus Arena; Attendance: 3,002; Referees: Yohan Rosso (FRA), Mārtiņš Kozlovskis (LAT), Igor Mitrovski (MKD)
Note:

25 February 2022	Israel	67–71	Germany	Tel Aviv
14:30	Scoring by quarter: 15–12, 18–23, 18–14, 16–22
	Pts: Ginat 20; Rebs: Ginat 7 Asts: Timor 6	Boxscore	Pts: Benzing 17; Rebs: Krämer 7 Asts: Hollatz 8	Arena: Drive in Arena; Attendance: 3,500; Referees: Ademir Zurapović (BIH), Fernando Calatrava (ESP), Beniamino Attard (ITA)
Note:

25 February 2022	Estonia	75–71	Poland	Tallinn
19:00	Scoring by quarter: 15–14, 32–22, 13–18, 15–17
	Pts: Jõesaar 22; Rebs: Kotsar 10; Asts: Rosenthal 9	Boxscore	Pts: Garbacz 15; Rebs: Garbacz 5 Asts: Sokołowski 7	Arena: Saku Suurhall; Attendance: 2,857; Referees: Marek Kúkelčík (SVK), Gatis Saliņš (LAT), Josip Jurčević (CRO)
Note:

28 February 2022	Poland	70–68	Estonia	Lublin
18:00	Scoring by quarter: 12–21, 26–21, 17–14, 15–12
	Pts: Sokołowski 15; Rebs: Ponitka, Zyskowski 5 Asts: Schenk 7	Boxscore	Pts: Kotsar 24; Rebs: Kotsar 7 Asts: Rosenthal 5	Arena: Globus Arena; Attendance: 1,520; Referees: Georgios Poursanidis (GRE), Özlem Yalman (TUR), Martin Vulić (CRO)
Note:

28 February 2022	Germany	84–80	Israel	Heidelberg
19:30	Scoring by quarter: 20–20, 19–14, 15–31, 30–15
	Pts: Lô 18; Rebs: Thiemann 9 Asts: Lô 7	Boxscore	Pts: Ginat 18; Rebs: Ginat 10; Asts: Blatt 6	Arena: SNP Dome; Attendance: 2,413; Referees: Marius Ciulin (ROU), Radomir Vojinović (MNE), Alexandre Deman (FRA)
Note:

30 June 2022	Estonia	57–88	Germany	Tallinn
19:00	Scoring by quarter: 11–18, 11–13, 16–36, 19–21
	Pts: Kotsar 13; Rebs: Kotsar 7 Asts: Kullamäe, Treier 4	Boxscore	Pts: Sengfelder 23; Rebs: Sengfelder 9 Asts: Schröder 9	Arena: Saku Suurhall; Attendance: 4,326; Referees: Nicolás Maestre (FRA), Thomas Bissuel (FRA), Zdenko Tomašovič (SVK)
Note:

30 June 2022	Poland	90–85(OT)	Israel	Lublin
20:30	Scoring by quarter: 18–12, 24–24, 15–19, 21–13, Overtime: 12–7
	Pts: Ponitka 23; Rebs: Ponitka 9 Asts: Ponitka 6	Boxscore	Pts: Menco 15; Rebs: Ginat 10; Asts: Zoosman 7	Arena: Globus Arena; Attendance: 2,063; Referees: Saverio Lanzarini (ITA), Ivor Matějek (CZE), Ilias Kounelles (CYP)
Note:

3 July 2022	Germany	93–83	Poland	Bremen
18:00	Scoring by quarter: 19–19, 21–17, 17–20, 36–27
	Pts: Schröder 38; Rebs: Voigtmann 10; Asts: Schröder 5	Boxscore	Pts: Slaughter 32; Rebs: Balcerowski 7 Asts: Ponitka 5	Arena: ÖVB Arena; Attendance: 6,359; Referees: Marius Ciulin (ROU), Petr Hrůša (CZE), Gintaras Mačiulis (LTU)
Note:

3 July 2022	Israel	96–77	Estonia	Tel Aviv
20:30	Scoring by quarter: 29–22, 19–22, 24–13, 24–20
	Pts: Ginat 17; Rebs: Zoosman 8 Asts: Blatt, Mekel 6	Boxscore	Pts: Kotsar 13; Rebs: Kullamäe 6 Asts: Kullamäe 8	Arena: Drive in Arena; Attendance: 3,500; Referees: Ademir Zurapović (BIH), Gintaras Vitkauskas (LTU), Zdravko Rutešić (MNE)

=== Group E ===
Pos	Team	Pld	W	L	PF	PA	PD	Pts	Qualification
1	France	6	5	1	464	343	+121	11	Second round (Group K)
2	Montenegro	6	4	2	464	428	+36	10	Second round (Group K)
3	Hungary	6	3	3	399	469	−70	9	Second round (Group K)
4	Portugal	6	0	6	386	473	−87	6	

Source: FIBA
Rules for classification: 1) Points; 2) Head-to-head results; 3) Points difference; 4) Points scored.

26 November 2021	Portugal	75–81	Hungary	Matosinhos
18:00	Scoring by quarter: 15–20, 19–18, 16–23, 26–20
	Pts: Borovnjak 16; Rebs: Monteiro 6 Asts: Ventura 5	Boxscore	Pts: Perl 19; Rebs: Keller 7 Asts: Váradi 6	Arena: Centro de Desportos e Congressos de Matosinhos; Attendance: 1,500; Referees: Wojciech Liszka (POL), Ivor Matějek (CZE), Gintaras Vitkauskas (LTU)
Note:

26 November 2021	France	73–67	Montenegro	Pau
20:30	Scoring by quarter: 13–22, 25–16, 11–18, 24–11
	Pts: Labeyrie 18; Rebs: Cordinier 8 Asts: Cordinier, Lacombe 4	Boxscore	Pts: Mihailović 23; Rebs: Radović 8 Asts: Cobbs 7	Arena: Palais des Sports de Pau; Attendance: 5,376; Referees: Martin Horozov (BUL), Kerem Baki (TUR), Lorenzo Baldini (ITA)
Note:

29 November 2021	Hungary	54–78	France	Kaposvár
18:00	Scoring by quarter: 8–21, 21–24, 9–18, 16–15
	Pts: Benke 14; Rebs: three players 4 Asts: Váradi 4	Boxscore	Pts: Labeyrie 19; Rebs: Labeyrie, Tarpey 6 Asts: Cordinier 7	Arena: Kaposvár Aréna; Attendance: 1,500; Referees: Marius Ciulin (ROU), Sergii Zashchuk (UKR), Ventsislav Velikov (BUL)
Note:

29 November 2021	Montenegro	83–69	Portugal	Podgorica
18:30	Scoring by quarter: 24–14, 17–22, 23–20, 19–13
	Pts: Cobbs 22; Rebs: Nikolić 11; Asts: three players 3	Boxscore	Pts: Relvão 16; Rebs: Queiroz 9 Asts: Barbosa 6	Arena: Bemax Arena; Attendance: 1 Referees: Manuel Mazzoni (ITA), Vilius Mačiulaitis (LTU), Sergei Beliakov (RUS)
Note:

24 February 2022	Hungary	67–83	Montenegro	Debrecen
18:00	Scoring by quarter: 15–17, 13–19, 14–20, 25–27
	Pts: Perl 14; Rebs: Keller 5 Asts: Perl 7	Boxscore	Pts: Mihailović 27; Rebs: Dubljević 8 Asts: Dubljević 7	Arena: Főnix Hall; Attendance: 4,500; Referees: Saverio Lanzarini (ITA), Gvidas Gedvilas (LTU), Carsten Straube (GER)
Note:

24 February 2022	France	94–56	Portugal	Dijon
19:00	Scoring by quarter: 15–17, 22–16, 27–11, 30–12
	Pts: Labeyrie 15; Rebs: Tarpey 10; Asts: Cordinier 7	Boxscore	Pts: Brito 15; Rebs: Queiroz 4 Asts: Brito, Ventura 4	Arena: Palais des Sports de Dijon; Attendance: 4,000; Referees: Aleksandar Glišić (SRB), Viola Györgyi (NOR), Geert Jacobs (BEL)
Note:

27 February 2022	Portugal	56–69	France	Matosinhos
17:00	Scoring by quarter: 16–17, 19–17, 8–15, 13–20
	Pts: Lisboa 14; Rebs: Borovnjak 7 Asts: Barbosa 5	Boxscore	Pts: M'Baye 16; Rebs: Lessort, Tarpey 6 Asts: Julien 5	Arena: Centro de Desportos e Congressos de Matosinhos; Attendance: 4,000; Referees: Oskars Lūcis (LAT), Zdenko Tomašovič (SVK), Vladimir Jevtović (SRB)
Note:

27 February 2022	Montenegro	84–88	Hungary	Podgorica
18:00	Scoring by quarter: 14–17, 21–23, 24–19, 25–29
	Pts: Cobbs 21; Rebs: Radončić 10; Asts: Dubljević 6	Boxscore	Pts: Vojvoda 24; Rebs: Allen, Perl 5 Asts: three players 4	Arena: Bemax Arena; Attendance: 2,300; Referees: Mārtiņš Kozlovskis (LAT), Geert Jacobs (BEL), Tanel Suslov (EST)
Note:

1 July 2022	Hungary	69–68	Portugal	Budapest
18:00	Scoring by quarter: 21–13, 19–18, 13–21, 16–16
	Pts: Allen 11; Rebs: Hopkins 11; Asts: Benke, Somogyi 5	Boxscore	Pts: Lisboa, Queiroz 16; Rebs: Brito, Queiroz 10; Asts: Brito 6	Arena: Tüskecsarnok; Attendance: 3,000; Referees: Erez Gurion (ISR), Carsten Straube (GER), Blaž Zupančič (SLO)
Note:

1 July 2022	Montenegro	70–69	France	Podgorica
19:00	Scoring by quarter: 15–15, 18–16, 23–17, 14–21
	Pts: Radović 15; Rebs: Ilić 10; Asts: Ivanović 5	Boxscore	Pts: Poirier 18; Rebs: Poirier 12; Asts: Albicy 4	Arena: Morača Sports Center; Attendance: 4,100; Referees: Manuel Mazzoni (ITA), Georgios Poursanidis (GRE), Fernando Calatrava (ESP)
Note:

4 July 2022	Portugal	62–77	Montenegro	Odivelas
19:00	Scoring by quarter: 14–19, 16–26, 21–21, 11–11
	Pts: Queiroz 17; Rebs: Queiroz 8 Asts: Lisboa 4	Boxscore	Pts: Ilić 14; Rebs: Ilić 9 Asts: Ivanović 8	Arena: Pavilhão Multiusos de Odivelas; Attendance: 900; Referees: Saverio Lanzarini (ITA), Beniamino Attard (ITA), Mehmet Sahin (TUR)
Note:

4 July 2022	France	81–40	Hungary	Mouilleron-le-Captif
20:30	Scoring by quarter: 15–11, 24–14, 29–2, 13–13
	Pts: Maledon 15; Rebs: Jaiteh 7 Asts: Lacombe 5	Boxscore	Pts: Perl, Vojvoda 7 Rebs: Golomán 5 Asts: Perl 3	Arena: Vendespace; Attendance: 4,073; Referees: Andris Aunkrogers (LAT), Tanel Suslov (EST), Pavel Fúska (SVK)

=== Group F ===
Pos	Team	Pld	W	L	PF	PA	PD	Pts	Qualification
1	Lithuania	6	5	1	462	421	+41	11	Second round (Group K)
2	Czech Republic	6	3	3	485	483	+2	9 (Note: Czech Republic 183–178 Bosnia and Herzegovina)	Second round (Group K)
3	Bosnia and Herzegovina	6	3	3	472	486	−14	9	Second round (Group K)
4	Bulgaria	6	1	5	446	475	−29	7	

Source: FIBA
Rules for classification: 1) Points; 2) Head-to-head results; 3) Points difference; 4) Points scored.
Notes:

26 November 2021	Lithuania	89–69	Bulgaria	Klaipėda
19:30	Scoring by quarter: 22–11, 20–20, 27–16, 20–22
	Pts: Olisevičius 20; Rebs: Olisevičius 9 Asts: Gailius 8	Boxscore	Pts: Ivanov 20; Rebs: Minchev 6 Asts: Petkov 4	Arena: Švyturys Arena; Attendance: 2,987; Referees: Luis Castillo (ESP), Igor Mitrovski (MKD), Vladimir Jevtović (SRB)
Note:

26 November 2021	Bosnia and Herzegovina	97–90	Czech Republic	Sarajevo
20:00	Scoring by quarter: 17–23, 27–33, 31–11, 22–23
	Pts: Musa 21; Rebs: Halilović 7 Asts: Atić, Roberson 4	Boxscore	Pts: Jelínek 31; Rebs: Peterka, Sehnal 6 Asts: Bohačík, Sehnal 4	Arena: Mirza Delibašić Hall; Attendance: 1,000; Referees: Manuel Mazzoni (ITA), Thomas Bissuel (FRA), Tanel Suslov (EST)
Note:

29 November 2021	Czech Republic	66–74	Lithuania	Opava
17:00	Scoring by quarter: 23–19, 9–26, 18–9, 16–20
	Pts: Kyzlink 21; Rebs: Bohačík 8 Asts: Šiřina 3	Boxscore	Pts: Kuzminskas 13; Rebs: Echodas 11; Asts: Kuzminskas 4	Arena: Hala Opava; Attendance: 0 Referees: Georgios Poursanidis (GRE), Wojciech Liszka (POL), Radomir Vojinović (MNE)
Note:

29 November 2021	Bulgaria	75–85	Bosnia and Herzegovina	Botevgrad
19:00	Scoring by quarter: 19–25, 23–25, 13–19, 20–16
	Pts: Kostov 13; Rebs: Kostov 9 Asts: Karamfilov, Marinov 5	Boxscore	Pts: Halilović 21; Rebs: Sulejmanović 8 Asts: Atić 5	Arena: Arena Botevgrad; Attendance: 1,300; Referees: Fernando Calatrava (ESP), Beniamino Attard (ITA), Ilias Kounelles (CYP)
Note:

24 February 2022	Bulgaria	79–70	Czech Republic	Botevgrad
19:00	Scoring by quarter: 23–21, 21–9, 11–17, 24–23
	Pts: Bost 24; Rebs: Kostov 9 Asts: Marinov, Bost 6	Boxscore	Pts: Hruban 21; Rebs: Peterka 15; Asts: Sehnal 5	Arena: Arena Botevgrad; Attendance: 3,500; Referees: Oskars Lūcis (LAT), Martin Vulić (CRO), Alexandre Deman (FRA)
Note:

24 February 2022	Bosnia and Herzegovina	77–78	Lithuania	Tuzla
20:00	Scoring by quarter: 21–13, 20–23, 15–24, 21–18
	Pts: Halilović 20; Rebs: Gegić 7 Asts: Musa 6	Boxscore	Pts: Olisevičius 18; Rebs: Butkevičius 7 Asts: Girdžiūnas 5	Arena: Dvorana Mejdan; Attendance: 4,000; Referees: Yohan Rosso (FRA), Kerem Baki (TUR), Lorenzo Baldini (ITA)
Note:

27 February 2022	Czech Republic	83–80	Bulgaria	Pardubice
19:00	Scoring by quarter: 25–25, 16–15, 15–18, 27–22
	Pts: Hruban 29; Rebs: Peterka 10; Asts: Hruban 5	Boxscore	Pts: Yanev 17; Rebs: Stoilov 9 Asts: Marinov 4	Arena: Enteria arena Attendance: 2,122; Referees: Boris Krejić (SLO), Zdravko Rutešić (MNE), Siniša Prpa (SRB)
Note:

27 February 2022	Lithuania	77–56	Bosnia and Herzegovina	Vilnius
19:30	Scoring by quarter: 20–12, 14–20, 21–12, 22–12
	Pts: Dimša 19; Rebs: Radzevičius 8 Asts: Birutis 3	Boxscore	Pts: Atić 12; Rebs: Sulejmanović 9 Asts: Atić 4	Arena: Avia Solutions Group Arena; Attendance: 2,246; Referees: Saverio Lanzarini (ITA), Luis Castillo (ESP), Carsten Straube (GER)
Note:

1 July 2022	Bulgaria	70–72	Lithuania	Samokov
19:00	Scoring by quarter: 22–16, 8–18, 25–17, 15–21
	Pts: Vezenkov 29; Rebs: Vezenkov 11; Asts: Marinov 5	Boxscore	Pts: Brazdeikis 13; Rebs: Brazdeikis, Grigonis 6 Asts: Čižauskas 5	Arena: Arena Samokov; Attendance: 2,500; Referees: Marius Ciulin (ROU), Mehmet Şahin (TUR), Marek Kúkelčík (SVK)
Note:

1 July 2022	Czech Republic	93–81	Bosnia and Herzegovina	Pardubice
20:00	Scoring by quarter: 24–17, 27–19, 19–22, 23–23
	Pts: Balvín 19; Rebs: Balvín 11; Asts: Satoranský 10	Boxscore	Pts: Musa, Roberson 16; Rebs: Halilović 10; Asts: Atić, Roberson 5	Arena: Enteria arena Attendance: 3,621; Referees: Mārtiņš Kozlovskis (LAT), Andris Aunkrogers (LAT), Tanel Suslov (EST)
Note:

4 July 2022	Lithuania	72–83	Czech Republic	Klaipėda
19:30	Scoring by quarter: 13–23, 19–22, 20–16, 20–22
	Pts: Brazdeikis 16; Rebs: Birutis 6 Asts: Grigonis 9	Boxscore	Pts: Satoranský 21; Rebs: Balvín 7 Asts: Kyzlink 5	Arena: Švyturys Arena; Attendance: 5,115; Referees: Lorenzo Baldini (ITA), Goran Šljivić (AUT), Ilias Kounelles (CYP)
Note:

4 July 2022	Bosnia and Herzegovina	76–73	Bulgaria	Sarajevo
20:00	Scoring by quarter: 19–18, 21–18, 18–26, 18–11
	Pts: Halilović 16; Rebs: Halilović 8 Asts: Musa 6	Boxscore	Pts: Bost 24; Rebs: Minchev 8 Asts: Yanev 6	Arena: Mirza Delibašić Hall; Attendance: 4,500; Referees: Georgios Poursanidis (GRE), Dariusz Zapolski (POL), Zafer Yılmaz (TUR)

=== Group G ===
Pos	Team	Pld	W	L	PF	PA	PD	Pts	Qualification
1	Spain	6	5	1	504	402	+102	11	Second round (Group L)
2	Georgia	6	4	2	467	462	+5	10	Second round (Group L)
3	Ukraine	6	3	3	463	448	+15	9	Second round (Group L)
4	North Macedonia	6	0	6	373	495	−122	6	

Source: FIBA
Rules for classification: 1) Points; 2) Head-to-head results; 3) Points difference; 4) Points scored.

26 November 2021	Georgia	88–83	Ukraine	Tbilisi
19:00	Scoring by quarter: 28–24, 17–22, 19–20, 24–17
	Pts: McFadden 27; Rebs: Shengelia 13; Asts: McFadden 9	Boxscore	Pts: Bliznyuk 18; Rebs: Petrov 12; Asts: Randle 6	Arena: Tbilisi Sports Palace; Attendance: 0 Referees: Martin Vulić (CRO), Dariusz Zapolski (POL), Mihkel Männiste (EST)
Note:

26 November 2021	North Macedonia	65–94	Spain	Skopje
19:30	Scoring by quarter: 14–21, 16–20, 17–29, 18–24
	Pts: Simić 18; Rebs: three players 5 Asts: Nikolov 6	Boxscore	Pts: Sima 17; Rebs: Sima 7 Asts: Guerra, Pérez 4	Arena: Jane Sandanski Arena; Attendance: 1,985; Referees: Tomas Jasevičius (LTU), Alexandre Deman (FRA), Sergei Beliakov (RUS)
Note:

29 November 2021	Ukraine	78–61	North Macedonia	Kyiv
19:00	Scoring by quarter: 14–17, 16–17, 19–13, 29–14
	Pts: Pustovyi 18; Rebs: Lukashov, Petrov 7 Asts: three players 4	Boxscore	Pts: Krstevski 14; Rebs: Wiley 9 Asts: Nikolov 6	Arena: Palace of Sports; Attendance: 2,300; Referees: Kerem Baki (TUR), Gintaras Vitkauskas (LTU), Gvidas Gedvilas (LTU)
Note:

29 November 2021	Spain	89–61	Georgia	Jaén
20:30	Scoring by quarter: 23–15, 24–16, 17–10, 25–20
	Pts: López-Arostegui 14; Rebs: Sima 8 Asts: Colom 6	Boxscore	Pts: Shermadini 21; Rebs: Shermadini 9 Asts: McFadden 5	Arena: Palacio de Deportes Olivo Arena; Attendance: 5,385; Referees: Boris Krejić (SLO), Paulo Marques (POR), Can Mavisu (TUR)
Note:

24 February 2022	Georgia	91–70	North Macedonia	Tbilisi
19:00	Scoring by quarter: 24–18, 22–13, 22–16, 23–23
	Pts: McFadden 26; Rebs: Shermadini 15; Asts: Bakradze 7	Boxscore	Pts: Stojanovski 15; Rebs: Krstevski 11; Asts: Krstevski 4	Arena: Tbilisi Sports Palace; Attendance: 2,821; Referees: Mārtiņš Kozlovskis (LAT), Ilias Kounelles (CYP), Goran Šljivić (AUT)
Note:

24 February 2022	Spain	88–74	Ukraine	Córdoba
20:45	Scoring by quarter: 22–17, 23–12, 28–17, 15–28
	Pts: López-Arostegui 15; Rebs: Parra 6 Asts: Colom 5	Boxscore	Pts: Randle 21; Rebs: Pustovyi 7 Asts: Randle 5	Arena: Palacio Municipal de Deportes Vista Alegre; Attendance: 2,480; Referees: Nicolás Maestre (FRA), Erez Gurion (ISR), Zdravko Rutešić (MNE)
Note:

27 February 2022	North Macedonia	65–79	Georgia	Skopje
20:00	Scoring by quarter: 21–18, 14–25, 17–15, 13–21
	Pts: Dimitrijević 25; Rebs: Wiley 9 Asts: Wiley 4	Boxscore	Pts: McFadden 24; Rebs: Jintcharadze, Shermadini 8 Asts: McFadden 5	Arena: Boris Trajkovski Sports Center; Attendance: 1,428; Referees: Martin Horozov (BUL), Gatis Saliņš (LAT), Ivor Matějek (CZE)
Note:

1 July 2022	Ukraine	79–66	Georgia	Riga, Latvia (Note: Due to the Russian invasion of Ukraine, the Ukrainian team played their home matches at neutral venues.)
19:00	Scoring by quarter: 23–20, 24–14, 13–10, 19–22
	Pts: Bobrov 17; Rebs: Bobrov 8 Asts: Sanon 6	Boxscore	Pts: McFadden 22; Rebs: Shermadini 11; Asts: Burjanadze, Sanadze 2	Arena: Arena Riga; Attendance: 1,350; Referees: Zafer Yılmaz (TUR), Petr Hrůša (CZE), Josip Jurčević (CRO)
Note:

1 July 2022	Spain	80–44	North Macedonia	Zaragoza
19:30	Scoring by quarter: 19–17, 26–6, 17–8, 18–13
	Pts: Saiz 19; Rebs: Saiz 9 Asts: three players 3	Boxscore	Pts: Jakimovski 14; Rebs: Jakimovski 6 Asts: Nikolov 4	Arena: Pabellón Príncipe Felipe; Attendance: 6,112; Referees: Oskars Lūcis (LAT), Dariusz Zapolski (POL), Alexandre Deman (FRA)
Note:

4 July 2022	North Macedonia	68–73	Ukraine	Skopje
18:00	Scoring by quarter: 21–35, 16–12, 16–10, 15–16
	Pts: Jakimovski 17; Rebs: Jakimovski 9 Asts: four players 3	Boxscore	Pts: Mykhailiuk 24; Rebs: Kovalov, Kravtsov 6 Asts: five players 2	Arena: Boris Trajkovski Sports Center; Attendance: 1,000; Referees: Luis Castillo (ESP), Mārtiņš Kozlovskis (LAT), Marek Kúkelčík (SVK)
Note:

4 July 2022	Georgia	82–76(OT)	Spain	Tbilisi
19:00	Scoring by quarter: 15–14, 22–17, 7–16, 23–20, Overtime: 15–9
	Pts: Shermadini 18; Rebs: Shengelia 10; Asts: McFadden 8	Boxscore	Pts: López-Arostegui 14; Rebs: Guerra 9 Asts: Bassas 7	Arena: Tbilisi Arena; Attendance: 8,500; Referees: Aleksandar Glišić (SRB), Radomir Vojinović (MNE), Siniša Prpa (SRB)
Note:

7 July 2022	Ukraine	76–77	Spain	Riga, Latvia
19:00	Scoring by quarter: 19–20, 20–20, 21–17, 16–20
	Pts: Mykhailiuk 15; Rebs: Pustovyi 9 Asts: Sanon 7	Boxscore	Pts: Fernández 14; Rebs: Pradilla, Saiz 5 Asts: Colom 4	Arena: Arena Riga; Attendance: 2,680; Referees: Ademir Zurapović (BIH), Andris Aunkrogers (LAT), Gintaras Vitkauskas (LTU)
Note: The game, originally scheduled for 27 February 2022, was postponed due to the Russian invasion of Ukraine.

=== Group H ===
Pos	Team	Pld	W	L	PF	PA	PD	Pts	Qualification
1	Italy	4	3	1	367	348	+19	7 (Note: Italy 200–194 Iceland)	Second round (Group L)
2	Iceland	4	3	1	340	343	−3	7	Second round (Group L)
3	Netherlands	4	0	4	297	313	−16	4	Second round (Group L)
4	Russia (Note: Russia was expelled, after beating Italy 92–78, Iceland 89–65 and Netherlands 80–69.)	0	0	0	0	0	0	0	Expelled

Source: FIBA
Rules for classification: 1) Points; 2) Head-to-head results; 3) Points difference; 4) Points scored.
Notes:

26 November 2021	Russia	Annulled	Italy
Note:

26 November 2021	Netherlands	77–79	Iceland	Almere
19:30	Scoring by quarter: 19–23, 22–21, 17–18, 19–17
	Pts: Franke 17; Rebs: De Jong 7 Asts: Van der Vuurst de Vries 7	Boxscore	Pts: Hermannsson 27; Rebs: Hlinason 8 Asts: Steinarsson 6	Arena: Topsportcentrum; Attendance: 0 Referees: Sergii Zashchuk (UKR), Zafer Yılmaz (TUR), Zdenko Tomašovič (SVK)
Note:

29 November 2021	Russia	Annulled	Iceland
Note:

29 November 2021	Italy	75–73	Netherlands	Milan
20:30	Scoring by quarter: 22–18, 25–21, 13–11, 15–23
	Pts: Akele 18; Rebs: Akele 6 Asts: Tonut 6	Boxscore	Pts: Hammink 19; Rebs: De Jong 6 Asts: Van der Vuurst de Vries 8	Arena: Mediolanum Forum; Attendance: 3,500; Referees: Tomas Jasevičius (LTU), Martin Vulić (CRO), Erez Gurion (ISR)
Note:

24 February 2022	Iceland	107–105(2OT)	Italy	Hafnarfjörður
20:00	Scoring by quarter: 21–18, 23–15, 21–26, 20–26, Overtime: 9–9, 13–11
	Pts: Hlinason 34; Rebs: Hlinason 21; Asts: Friðriksson, Hermannsson 7	Boxscore	Pts: Mannion 23; Rebs: Vitali 9 Asts: Mannion 7	Arena: Ásvellir; Attendance: 902; Referees: Luis Castillo (ESP), Ivor Matějek (CZE), Blaž Zupančič (SLO)
Note:

24 February 2022	Russia	Annulled	Netherlands
Note:

27 February 2022	Netherlands	Cancelled	Russia
Note: The game, originally scheduled for 27 February 2022, was postponed due to the Russian invasion of Ukraine.

27 February 2022	Italy	95–87	Iceland	Bologna
20:30	Scoring by quarter: 27–28, 26–17, 21–17, 21–25
	Pts: Della Valle 26; Rebs: Biligha 5 Asts: Della Valle 5	Boxscore	Pts: Friðriksson 30; Rebs: Ermolinskij 9 Asts: Ermolinskij 10	Arena: PalaDozza; Attendance: 3,240; Referees: Nicolás Maestre (FRA), Fernando Calatrava (ESP), Can Mavisu (TUR)
Note:

1 July 2022	Iceland	67–66	Netherlands	Hafnarfjörður
20:00	Scoring by quarter: 16–20, 5–15, 26–16, 20–15
	Pts: Friðriksson, Hlinason 20; Rebs: Hlinason 11; Asts: Guðmundsson 5	Boxscore	Pts: De Jong 15; Rebs: De Jong 11; Asts: Van der Vuurst de Vries 4	Arena: Ásvellir; Attendance: 952; Referees: Yener Yılmaz (TUR), Geert Jacobs (BEL), Goran Šljivić (AUT)
Note:

1 July 2022	Italy	Cancelled	Russia
Note:

4 July 2022	Netherlands	81–92	Italy	Almere
19:30	Scoring by quarter: 17–22, 26–32, 21–18, 17–20
	Pts: Franke 30; Rebs: Franke 5 Asts: De Jong 8	Boxscore	Pts: Fontecchio 22; Rebs: Biligha 6 Asts: Spissu 5	Arena: Topsportcentrum; Attendance: 3,000; Referees: Boris Krejić (SLO), Alexandre Deman (FRA), Vladimir Jevtović (SRB)
Note:

4 July 2022	Iceland	Cancelled	Russia

== Second round ==
As only three teams played in Group B and H after the disqualication of Russia and Belarus, the results of the qualified teams from Group A and G against the last-placed team were not carried over.

=== Group I ===
Pos	Team	Pld	W	L	PF	PA	PD	Pts	Qualification
1	Latvia	10	9	1	807	707	+100	19	2023 FIBA Basketball World Cup
2	Serbia	10	6	4	825	803	+22	16 (Note: Serbia 192–191 Greece)	2023 FIBA Basketball World Cup
3	Greece	10	6	4	775	764	+11	16	2023 FIBA Basketball World Cup
4	Turkey	10	4	6	782	742	+40	14 (Note: Turkey 2–0 Belgium)	
5	Belgium	10	4	6	679	717	−38	14	
6	Great Britain	10	1	9	697	832	−135	11	

Source: FIBA
Rules for classification: 1) Points; 2) Head-to-head results; 3) Points difference; 4) Points scored.
Notes:

25 August 2022	Latvia	111–85	Turkey	Riga
19:30	Scoring by quarter: 31–20, 25–27, 31–16, 24–22
	Pts: Porziņģis 22; Rebs: Porziņģis 14; Asts: Strēlnieks 8	Boxscore	Pts: Larkin, Osman 15; Rebs: Kabaca 5 Asts: three players 3	Arena: Arena Riga; Attendance: 11,315; Referees: Ademir Zurapović (BIH), Sergii Zashchuk (UKR), Marius Ciulin (ROU)

25 August 2022	Serbia	100–94(OT)	Greece	Belgrade
20:00	Scoring by quarter: 31–25, 20–19, 19–19, 17–24, Overtime: 13–7
	Pts: Jokić 29; Rebs: Jokić 8 Asts: Kalinić 7	Boxscore	Pts: G. Antetokounmpo 40; Rebs: G. Antetokounmpo 8 Asts: Calathes 8	Arena: Štark Arena; Attendance: 19,150; Referees: Manuel Mazzoni (ITA), Wojciech Liszka (POL), Luis Castillo (ESP)

25 August 2022	Belgium	72–57	Great Britain	Mons
20:30	Scoring by quarter: 20–12, 13–15, 22–16, 17–14
	Pts: Bako 17; Rebs: Bako 7 Asts: Obasohan 4	Boxscore	Pts: Hesson 17; Rebs: Okereafor, Soko 6 Asts: Okereafor, Soko 2	Arena: Mons.Arena; Attendance: 1,340; Referees: Nicolás Maestre (FRA), Fernando Calatrava (ESP), Alexandre Deman (FRA)

28 August 2022	Great Britain	80–87	Latvia	Newcastle
18:00	Scoring by quarter: 16–24, 22–14, 22–26, 20–23
	Pts: Hesson 15; Rebs: Hesson 8 Asts: Hesson, Nelson 8	Boxscore	Pts: Porziņģis 29; Rebs: Porziņģis 14; Asts: Lomažs, Zoriks 4	Arena: Vertu Motors Arena; Attendance: 2,300; Referees: Saverio Lanzarini (ITA), Lorenzo Baldini (ITA), Martin Vulić (CRO)

28 August 2022	Greece	85–68	Belgium	Athens
20:00	Scoring by quarter: 30–15, 19–18, 15–11, 21–24
	Pts: G. Antetokounmpo 26; Rebs: G. Antetokounmpo 7 Asts: Calathes 5	Boxscore	Pts: Obasohan 14; Rebs: Bako 9 Asts: Lecomte 5	Arena: O.A.C.A. Olympic Indoor Hall; Attendance: 19,443; Referees: Marius Ciulin (ROU), Gvidas Gedvilas (LTU), Beniamino Attard (ITA)

28 August 2022	Turkey	72–79	Serbia	Istanbul
20:00	Scoring by quarter: 11–26, 17–21, 27–18, 17–14
	Pts: Osman 22; Rebs: Şengün 13; Asts: Larkin 9	Boxscore	Pts: Jokić 24; Rebs: Jokić 10; Asts: Micić 7	Arena: Sinan Erdem Dome; Attendance: 15,556; Referees: Antonio Conde (ESP), Martin Horozov (BUL), Michał Proc (POL)

11 November 2022	Greece	60–80	Latvia	Heraklion
19:00	Scoring by quarter: 13–16, 15–20, 17–27, 15–17
	Pts: Gkikas, Gontikas 11; Rebs: Gontikas 7 Asts: Lountzis 3	Boxscore	Pts: Strēlnieks 19; Rebs: Gražulis, Mejeris 8 Asts: Gražulis 4	Arena: Heraklion Indoor Sports Arena; Attendance: 5,500; Referees: Ademir Zurapović (BIH), Nicolás Maestre (FRA), Ivor Matějek (CZE)

11 November 2022	Great Britain	68–74	Serbia	Newcastle
19:00	Scoring by quarter: 20–21, 14–17, 17–19, 17–17
	Pts: Olaseni 20; Rebs: Olaseni, Williams 7 Asts: Nelson 9	Boxscore	Pts: Ristić 15; Rebs: Ristić 11; Asts: Jaramaz 5	Arena: Vertu Motors Arena; Attendance: 2,003; Referees: Marius Ciulin (ROU), Fernando Calatrava (ESP), Gintaras Mačiulis (LTU)

11 November 2022	Turkey	86–52	Belgium	Istanbul
21:00	Scoring by quarter: 23–13, 20–14, 17–13, 26–12
	Pts: Bitim 19; Rebs: Bitim 6 Asts: Bitim 5	Boxscore	Pts: Bako 17; Rebs: Bako, Mwema 5 Asts: Akyazili 5	Arena: Sinan Erdem Dome; Attendance: 10,000; Referees: Boris Krejić (SLO), Lorenzo Baldini (ITA), Sergii Zashchuk (UKR)

14 November 2022	Latvia	79–63	Great Britain	Riga
19:30	Scoring by quarter: 22–17, 18–11, 18–12, 21–23
	Pts: Lomažs 15; Rebs: three players 7 Asts: three players 4	Boxscore	Pts: Nelson 16; Rebs: Wheatle 8 Asts: Nelson 8	Arena: Arena Riga; Attendance: 11,057; Referees: Radomir Vojinović (MNE), Carsten Straube (GER), Ventsislav Velikov (BUL)

14 November 2022	Serbia	77–76	Turkey	Belgrade
20:00	Scoring by quarter: 24–21, 13–13, 17–20, 23–22
	Pts: Gudurić 18; Rebs: Lučić 7 Asts: Jaramaz, Jović 5	Boxscore	Pts: Wilbekin 22; Rebs: Bitim 5 Asts: Wilbekin 3	Arena: Aleksandar Nikolić Hall; Attendance: 6,100; Referees: Yohan Rosso (FRA), Saverio Lanzarini (ITA), Luis Castillo (ESP)

14 November 2022	Belgium	70–72	Greece	Mons
20:30	Scoring by quarter: 19–19, 15–12, 21–27, 15–14
	Pts: Obasohan 30; Rebs: Mwema 10; Asts: Lecomte, Obasohan 4	Boxscore	Pts: Larentzakis 20; Rebs: Bochoridis, Larentzakis 4 Asts: Calathes 10	Arena: Mons.Arena; Attendance: 3,200; Referees: Martin Horozov (BUL), Fernando Calatrava (ESP), Marius Ciulin (ROU)

24 February 2023	Greece	97–92(OT)	Serbia	Athens
19:00	Scoring by quarter: 8–15, 22–24, 25–23, 25–18, Overtime: 17–12
	Pts: Rogkavopoulos 28; Rebs: Chougkaz 5 Asts: Moraitis 5	Boxscore	Pts: Milutinov 24; Rebs: Milutinov 9 Asts: Jović 8	Arena: Ano Liosia Olympic Hall; Attendance: 7,101; Referees: Antonio Conde (ESP), Luis Castillo (ESP), Paulo Marques (POR)

24 February 2023	Great Britain	59–88	Belgium	Newcastle
19:30	Scoring by quarter: 16–19, 10–23, 13–20, 20–26
	Pts: Wheatle 15; Rebs: Sharma 5 Asts: Ellis 4	Boxscore	Pts: Tabu 15; Rebs: De Ridder 9 Asts: Libert, Samardzic 5	Arena: Vertu Motors Arena; Attendance: 2,239; Referees: Ademir Zurapović (BIH), Marek Kúkelčík (SVK), Ilias Kounelles (CYP)

24 February 2023	Turkey	74–83	Latvia	Bursa
20:00	Scoring by quarter: 23–26, 23–23, 7–21, 21–13
	Pts: Bitim 17; Rebs: Saybir 5 Asts: Özdemiroğlu 5	Boxscore	Pts: Žagars 14; Rebs: Čavars 7 Asts: Gražulis 5	Arena: Tofaş Nilüfer Spor Salonu; Attendance: 6,048; Referees: Marius Ciulin (ROU), Fernando Calatrava (ESP), Martin Horozov (BUL)

27 February 2023	Latvia	67–57	Greece	Riga
19:30	Scoring by quarter: 18–8, 15–24, 19–9, 15–16
	Pts: Leimanis, Strautiņš 11; Rebs: Gražulis 6 Asts: Leimanis 8	Boxscore	Pts: Chatzidakis 9 Rebs: Moraitis 7 Asts: Mouratos 4	Arena: Arena Riga; Attendance: 11,127; Referees: Ademir Zurapović (BIH), Saverio Lanzarini (ITA), Nicolás Maestre (FRA)

27 February 2023	Serbia	101–83	Great Britain	Belgrade
20:00	Scoring by quarter: 28–20, 18–21, 28–19, 27–23
	Pts: Avramović 20; Rebs: Ristić 6 Asts: Jović 7	Boxscore	Pts: Ellis 22; Rebs: Menzies 6 Asts: Wheatle 4	Arena: Aleksandar Nikolić Hall; Attendance: 6,850; Referees: Manuel Mazzoni (ITA), Fernando Calatrava (ESP), Beniamino Attard (ITA)

27 February 2023	Belgium	54–82	Turkey	Mons
20:30	Scoring by quarter: 14–22, 17–23, 14–19, 9–18
	Pts: Lecomte 14; Rebs: De Ridder 8 Asts: three players 2	Boxscore	Pts: Özdemiroğlu 19; Rebs: Özdemiroğlu 9 Asts: three players 3	Arena: Mons.Arena; Attendance: 3,570; Referees: Yohan Rosso (FRA), Lorenzo Baldini (ITA), Boris Krejić (SLO)

=== Group J ===
Pos	Team	Pld	W	L	PF	PA	PD	Pts	Qualification
1	Germany	12	10	2	960	854	+106	22	2023 FIBA Basketball World Cup
2	Finland	12	9	3	978	934	+44	21	2023 FIBA Basketball World Cup
3	Slovenia	12	7	5	994	958	+36	19	2023 FIBA Basketball World Cup
4	Sweden	12	5	7	919	939	−20	17	
5	Israel	12	4	8	944	948	−4	16 (Note: Israel 2–0 Estonia)	
6	Estonia	12	4	8	870	977	−107	16	

Source: FIBA
Rules for classification: 1) Points; 2) Head-to-head results; 3) Points difference; 4) Points scored.
Notes:

25 August 2022	Finland	79–73	Israel	Tampere
18:30	Scoring by quarter: 22–19, 25–18, 11–19, 21–17
	Pts: Markkanen 28; Rebs: Markkanen 9 Asts: Maxhuni 8	Boxscore	Pts: Sorkin 14; Rebs: Sorkin 8 Asts: Blatt, Pnini 4	Arena: Nokia Arena; Attendance: 11,554; Referees: Yohan Rosso (FRA), Mārtiņš Kozlovskis (LAT), Radomir Vojinović (MNE)

25 August 2022	Sweden	50–67	Germany	Stockholm
18:30	Scoring by quarter: 9–25, 20–21, 13–8, 8–13
	Pts: Pantzar 11; Rebs: Birgander 10; Asts: Njie 3	Boxscore	Pts: Wagner 16; Rebs: Wohlfarth-Bottermann 12; Asts: Wagner 5	Arena: Hovet; Attendance: 5,460; Referees: Georgios Poursanidis (GRE), Kerem Baki (TUR), Igor Mitrovski (MKD)

25 August 2022	Slovenia	104–83	Estonia	Celje
20:30	Scoring by quarter: 27–23, 29–15, 21–25, 27–20
	Pts: Dončić 25; Rebs: Dončić 11; Asts: Dončić 8	Boxscore	Pts: Kriisa 14; Rebs: Tass 5 Asts: Kriisa 5	Arena: Zlatorog Arena; Attendance: 5,100; Referees: Zafer Yılmaz (TUR), Andris Aunkrogers (LAT), Ilias Kounelles (CYP)

28 August 2022	Germany	90–71	Slovenia	Munich
15:00	Scoring by quarter: 17–20, 16–11, 28–15, 29–25
	Pts: Schröder 17; Rebs: Voigtmann 14; Asts: Schröder 10	Boxscore	Pts: Dončić 23; Rebs: Dončić 6 Asts: Dončić 5	Arena: Audi Dome; Attendance: 6,136; Referees: Yohan Rosso (FRA), Nicolás Maestre (FRA), Fernando Calatrava (ESP)

28 August 2022	Estonia	68–76	Finland	Tallinn
18:00	Scoring by quarter: 21–23, 15–24, 18–10, 14–19
	Pts: Kotsar 14; Rebs: Kotsar 9 Asts: Kriisa, Kullamäe 4	Boxscore	Pts: Salin 20; Rebs: Madsen 12; Asts: Maxhuni 4	Arena: Saku Suurhall; Attendance: 3,877; Referees: Ademir Zurapović (BIH), Viola Györgyi (NOR), Gintaras Mačiulis (LTU)

28 August 2022	Israel	83–95	Sweden	Tel Aviv
21:00	Scoring by quarter: 23–24, 15–28, 22–18, 23–25
	Pts: Madar 27; Rebs: Sorkin 7 Asts: Mekel 4	Boxscore	Pts: Borg 20; Rebs: Birgander 7 Asts: Pantzar 6	Arena: Drive in Arena; Attendance: 3,000; Referees: Aleksandar Glišić (SRB), Sergii Zashchuk (UKR), Gatis Saliņš (LAT)

11 November 2022	Israel	62–75	Slovenia	Tel Aviv
14:00	Scoring by quarter: 18–15, 16–23, 17–18, 11–19
	Pts: Ginat 12; Rebs: Ginat 6 Asts: Misgav, Timor 3	Boxscore	Pts: Lapornik, Murić 16; Rebs: Morgan 8 Asts: Samar 6	Arena: Drive in Arena; Attendance: 2,300; Referees: Saverio Lanzarini (ITA), Wojciech Liszka (POL), Beniamino Attard (ITA)

11 November 2022	Estonia	82–87	Sweden	Tallinn
19:05	Scoring by quarter: 13–27, 24–12, 24–20, 21–28
	Pts: Kullamäe 24; Rebs: four players 7 Asts: Kullamäe 6	Boxscore	Pts: Håkanson 24; Rebs: Birgander 11; Asts: Håkanson 6	Arena: Saku Suurhall; Attendance: 3,040; Referees: Georgios Poursanidis (GRE), Andris Aunkrogers (LAT), Viola Györgyi (NOR)

11 November 2022	Germany	94–80	Finland	Bamberg
19:30	Scoring by quarter: 22–19, 22–17, 25–16, 25–28
	Pts: Krämer, Sengfelder 19; Rebs: Schilling 9 Asts: Hollatz 9	Boxscore	Pts: Murphy 20; Rebs: Jantunen 6 Asts: Maxhuni 4	Arena: Brose Arena; Attendance: 3,927; Referees: Manuel Mazzoni (ITA), Mārtiņš Kozlovskis (LAT), Radomir Vojinović (MNE)

14 November 2022	Finland	91–71	Estonia	Espoo
18:30	Scoring by quarter: 21–16, 18–25, 27–15, 25–15
	Pts: Jantunen 24; Rebs: Jantunen, Madsen 8 Asts: Maxhuni 7	Boxscore	Pts: Konontsuk 13; Rebs: Konontsuk, Kullamäe 5 Asts: Tass 4	Arena: Espoo Metro Areena; Attendance: 5,528; Referees: Michał Proc (POL), Péter Praksch (HUN), Alexandre Deman (FRA)

14 November 2022	Slovenia	81–75	Germany	Koper
18:00	Scoring by quarter: 16–24, 25–10, 20–14, 20–27
	Pts: Morgan 22; Rebs: Morgan 13; Asts: Samar 12	Boxscore	Pts: Krämer 21; Rebs: Schilling 8 Asts: Doreth 7	Arena: Arena Bonifika; Attendance: 1,319; Referees: Antonio Conde (ESP), Yener Yılmaz (TUR), Gatis Saliņš (LAT)

14 November 2022	Sweden	71–68	Israel	Norrköping
19:35	Scoring by quarter: 17–16, 20–24, 16–8, 18–20
	Pts: Håkanson 29; Rebs: Birgander 11; Asts: Birgander 4	Boxscore	Pts: Menco 17; Rebs: Timor 8 Asts: Ginat, Misgav 3	Arena: Stadium Arena; Attendance: 2,138; Referees: Kerem Baki (TUR), Ivor Matějek (CZE), Siniša Prpa (SRB)

24 February 2023	Israel	95–97(OT)	Finland	Tel Aviv
14:30	Scoring by quarter: 28–13, 18–22, 24–25, 13–23, Overtime: 12–14
	Pts: Timor 27; Rebs: Zalmanson 11; Asts: Timor, Zalmanson 6	Boxscore	Pts: Salin 18; Rebs: Murphy 9 Asts: Maxhuni 6	Arena: Drive in Arena; Attendance: 1,590; Referees: Georgios Poursanidis (GRE), Vladimir Jevtović (SRB), Anastasios Kardaris (GRE)

24 February 2023	Estonia	79–78	Slovenia	Tallinn
17:00	Scoring by quarter: 24–16, 13–24, 18–19, 24–19
	Pts: Toom 15; Rebs: Riismaa, Treier 6 Asts: Rosenthal, Treier 4	Boxscore	Pts: Glas 18; Rebs: Mahkovic 7 Asts: Samar 9	Arena: Unibet Arena; Attendance: 3,832; Referees: Yohan Rosso (FRA), Dariusz Zapolski (POL), Geert Jacobs (BEL)

24 February 2023	Germany	73–66	Sweden	Frankfurt
19:30	Scoring by quarter: 21–19, 19–12, 17–14, 16–21
	Pts: Krämer 13; Rebs: Richter 14; Asts: Voigtmann 6	Boxscore	Pts: Spires 13; Rebs: Bangala, Pantzar 7 Asts: Pantzar 6	Arena: Fraport Arena; Attendance: 5,002; Referees: Nicolás Maestre (FRA), Gvidas Gedvilas (LTU), Beniamino Attard (ITA)

27 February 2023	Slovenia	79–87	Israel	Koper
18:00	Scoring by quarter: 16–22, 22–20, 25–13, 16–32
	Pts: Glas 26; Rebs: Macura 6 Asts: Nikolić 6	Boxscore	Pts: Levi 20; Rebs: Ginat, Yaacov 7 Asts: Yaacov 7	Arena: Arena Bonifika; Attendance: 1,500; Referees: Sergii Zashchuk (UKR), Zdenko Tomašovič (SVK), Gintaras Mačiulis (LTU)

27 February 2023	Finland	81–87	Germany	Espoo
18:30	Scoring by quarter: 22–17, 21–29, 19–23, 19–18
	Pts: Jantunen 20; Rebs: Jantunen 6 Asts: Maxhuni 6	Boxscore	Pts: Hollatz 20; Rebs: Hollatz 14; Asts: Richter, Voigtmann 3	Arena: Espoo Metro Areena; Attendance: 6,504; Referees: Mārtiņš Kozlovskis (LAT), Aleksandar Glišić (SRB), Viola Györgyi (NOR)

27 February 2023	Sweden	71–72	Estonia	Malmö
19:05	Scoring by quarter: 16–17, 14–11, 14–15, 27–29
	Pts: Pantzar 23; Rebs: Andersson, Pantzar 8 Asts: Pantzar 5	Boxscore	Pts: Kitsing 14; Rebs: Toom 6 Asts: Kullamäe 4	Arena: Baltiska Hallen; Attendance: 3,650; Referees: Özlem Yalman (TUR), Marek Kúkelčík (SVK), Josip Jurčević (CRO)

=== Group K ===
Pos	Team	Pld	W	L	PF	PA	PD	Pts	Qualification
1	France	12	10	2	973	742	+231	22	2023 FIBA Basketball World Cup
2	Lithuania	12	9	3	922	852	+70	21	2023 FIBA Basketball World Cup
3	Montenegro	12	7	5	900	852	+48	19	2023 FIBA Basketball World Cup
4	Hungary	12	6	6	871	954	−83	18 (Note: Hungary 165–160 Bosnia and Herzegovina)	
5	Bosnia and Herzegovina	12	6	6	927	987	−60	18	
6	Czech Republic	12	3	9	878	968	−90	15	

Source: FIBA
Rules for classification: 1) Points; 2) Head-to-head results; 3) Points difference; 4) Points scored.
Notes:

24 August 2022	Hungary	78–88	Lithuania	Szombathely
18:00	Scoring by quarter: 21–20, 17–22, 27–27, 13–19
	Pts: Hanga 21; Rebs: Eilingsfeld 5 Asts: Perl 4	Boxscore	Pts: Sabonis, Valančiūnas 17; Rebs: Valančiūnas 8 Asts: Grigonis 5	Arena: Arena Savaria; Attendance: 3,000; Referees: Aleksandar Glišić (SRB), Saverio Lanzarini (ITA), Beniamino Attard (ITA)

24 August 2022	Montenegro	88–69	Bosnia and Herzegovina	Podgorica
19:00	Scoring by quarter: 18–15, 23–11, 25–20, 22–23
	Pts: Mihailović 20; Rebs: Dubljević 8 Asts: Drobnjak, Perry 4	Boxscore	Pts: Roberson 20; Rebs: Nurkić 7 Asts: Roberson 7	Arena: Morača Sports Center; Attendance: 5,000; Referees: Antonio Conde (ESP), Oskars Lūcis (LAT), Carsten Straube (GER)

24 August 2022	France	95–60	Czech Republic	Paris
20:30	Scoring by quarter: 18–27, 20–15, 28–8, 29–10
	Pts: Luwawu-Cabarrot, Yabusele 16; Rebs: Gobert, Poirier 7 Asts: Heurtel 9	Boxscore	Pts: Hruban 14; Rebs: Balvín, Hruban 7 Asts: Veselý 7	Arena: Accor Arena; Attendance: 14,578; Referees: Boris Krejić (SLO), Gatis Saliņš (LAT), Martin Vulić (CRO)

27 August 2022	Czech Republic	79–82	Hungary	Chomutov
18:15	Scoring by quarter: 23–23, 21–24, 21–15, 14–20
	Pts: Hruban 26; Rebs: Kyzlink 7 Asts: Sehnal 8	Boxscore	Pts: Hanga 20; Rebs: Hanga 12; Asts: Vojvoda 6	Arena: Rocknet aréna Attendance: 3,616; Referees: Luis Castillo (ESP), Josip Jurčević (CRO), Ventsislav Velikov (BUL)

27 August 2022	Lithuania	90–73	Montenegro	Kaunas
19:30	Scoring by quarter: 22–21, 17–15, 32–15, 19–22
	Pts: Grigonis 16; Rebs: Valančiūnas 14; Asts: Jokubaitis 10	Boxscore	Pts: Perry 21; Rebs: Simonović 5 Asts: Perry 4	Arena: Žalgiris Arena; Attendance: 6,974; Referees: Mārtiņš Kozlovskis (LAT), Paulo Marques (POR), Kerem Baki (TUR)

27 August 2022	Bosnia and Herzegovina	96–90(2OT)	France	Sarajevo
20:00	Scoring by quarter: 28–14, 10–32, 21–5, 17–25, Overtime: 7–7, 13–7
	Pts: Nurkić 21; Rebs: Nurkić 9 Asts: Musa 5	Boxscore	Pts: Fournier 24; Rebs: Gobert 13; Asts: Fournier, Tarpey 3	Arena: Mirza Delibašić Hall; Attendance: 6,826; Referees: Manuel Mazzoni (ITA), Wojciech Liszka (POL), Ilias Kounelles (CYP)

11 November 2022	Czech Republic	56–65	Montenegro	Pardubice
18:15	Scoring by quarter: 15–15, 9–18, 14–21, 18–11
	Pts: Hruban 14; Rebs: Balvín 11; Asts: Bálint, Balvín 3	Boxscore	Pts: Radović 15; Rebs: Nikolić 13; Asts: Mihailović 4	Arena: Enteria arena Attendance: 2,823; Referees: Antonio Conde (ESP), Mihkel Männiste (EST), Zdenko Tomašovič (SVK)

11 November 2022	Lithuania	65–90	France	Panevėžys
19:30	Scoring by quarter: 14–22, 19–21, 14–27, 18–20
	Pts: Bendžius, Blaževič 14; Rebs: Echodas 8 Asts: Velička 7	Boxscore	Pts: Francisco 21; Rebs: Inglis 8 Asts: Albicy, Sene 4	Arena: Cido Arena; Attendance: 4,699; Referees: Martin Horozov (BUL), Gatis Saliņš (LAT), Yener Yılmaz (TUR)

11 November 2022	Bosnia and Herzegovina	83–78	Hungary	Sarajevo
20:00	Scoring by quarter: 23–18, 29–20, 10–26, 21–14
	Pts: Kamenjaš 20; Rebs: Kamenjas 14; Asts: Gegić 8	Boxscore	Pts: Filipovity 17; Rebs: Keller, Perl 5 Asts: Benke, Perl 3	Arena: Mirza Delibašić Hall; Attendance: 3,500; Referees: Michał Proc (POL), Oskars Lūcis (LAT), Carsten Straube (GER)

14 November 2022	Hungary	83–69	Czech Republic	Szombathely
18:00	Scoring by quarter: 18–21, 18–12, 31–10, 16–26
	Pts: Filipovity 15; Rebs: Filipovity 5 Asts: Somogyi 7	Boxscore	Pts: Kyzlink 21; Rebs: Balvín 17; Asts: Kříž 5	Arena: Arena Savaria; Attendance: 2,400; Referees: Manuel Mazzoni (ITA), Zafer Yılmaz (TUR), Vladimir Jevtović (SRB)

14 November 2022	Montenegro	56–65	Lithuania	Podgorica
19:00	Scoring by quarter: 15–19, 15–18, 14–12, 12–16
	Pts: Ivanović, Mihailović 11; Rebs: Nikolić 7 Asts: Ivanović 3	Boxscore	Pts: Kariniauskas, Kuzminskas 13; Rebs: Echodas 7 Asts: Normantas 5	Arena: Morača Sports Center; Attendance: 5,000; Referees: Wojciech Liszka (POL), Beniamino Attard (ITA), Oskars Lūcis (LAT)

14 November 2022	France	92–56	Bosnia and Herzegovina	Pau
20:30	Scoring by quarter: 17–13, 23–14, 19–17, 33–12
	Pts: Wembanyama 19; Rebs: Kamagate 6 Asts: Francisco, Sene 4	Boxscore	Pts: Kamenjaš 20; Rebs: Penava 8 Asts: Gegić 5	Arena: Palais des Sports de Pau; Attendance: 6,332; Referees: Georgios Poursanidis (GRE), Lorenzo Baldini (ITA), Andris Aunkrogers (LAT)

23 February 2023	Czech Republic	59–72	France	Pardubice
18:45	Scoring by quarter: 27–11, 9–16, 11–22, 12–23
	Pts: Kyzlink 23; Rebs: Hruban 7 Asts: Kyzlink 5	Boxscore	Pts: Wembanyama 22; Rebs: Wembanyama 17; Asts: Francisco 8	Arena: Enteria arena Attendance: 4,521; Referees: Saverio Lanzarini (ITA), Oskars Lūcis (LAT), Franko Gracin (CRO)

23 February 2023	Lithuania	89–64	Hungary	Klaipėda
19:30	Scoring by quarter: 14–16, 26–15, 23–14, 26–19
	Pts: Kuzminskas 14; Rebs: Bendžius, Kuzminskas 6 Asts: Kariniauskas 8	Boxscore	Pts: Hopkins 17; Rebs: Golomán, Hopkins 5 Asts: Váradi 6	Arena: Švyturys Arena; Attendance: 4,389; Referees: Boris Krejić (SLO), Michał Proc (POL), Sergii Zashchuk (UKR)

23 February 2023	Bosnia and Herzegovina	74–66	Montenegro	Tuzla
20:00	Scoring by quarter: 18–19, 16–18, 20–11, 20–18
	Pts: Roberson 19; Rebs: Kamenjaš 10; Asts: Roberson 6	Boxscore	Pts: Perry 19; Rebs: Radović 11; Asts: Perry 5	Arena: Dvorana Mejdan; Attendance: 5,200; Referees: Manuel Mazzoni (ITA), Mārtiņš Kozlovskis (LAT), Gatis Saliņš (LAT)

26 February 2023	France	70–63	Lithuania	Trélazé
18:00	Scoring by quarter: 11–14, 24–13, 18–16, 17–20
	Pts: Wembanyama 15; Rebs: Inglis 7 Asts: Inglis 6	Boxscore	Pts: Normantas 17; Rebs: Maldūnas 6 Asts: Kariniauskas 6	Arena: Arena Loire; Attendance: 5,039; Referees: Luis Castillo (ESP), Carsten Straube (GER), Anastasios Kardaris (GRE)

26 February 2023	Montenegro	88–70	Czech Republic	Podgorica
19:00	Scoring by quarter: 32–14, 18–11, 20–21, 18–24
	Pts: Ivanović 17; Rebs: Radović 9 Asts: Perry 7	Boxscore	Pts: Hanzlík 17; Rebs: Kyzlink 7 Asts: Kyzlink 8	Arena: Morača Sports Center; Attendance: 5,300; Referees: Paulo Marques (POR), Marius Ciulin (ROU), Ilias Kounelles (CYP)

26 February 2023	Hungary	87–77	Bosnia and Herzegovina	Szombathely
19:00	Scoring by quarter: 19–23, 27–14, 17–23, 24–17
	Pts: Benke 19; Rebs: Eilingsfeld, Keller 8 Asts: Somogyi 11	Boxscore	Pts: Roberson 22; Rebs: Kamenjaš, Vrabac 6 Asts: Gegić 6	Arena: Arena Savaria; Attendance: 2,903; Referees: Antonio Conde (ESP), Wojciech Liszka (POL), Yener Yılmaz (TUR)

=== Group L ===
Pos	Team	Pld	W	L	PF	PA	PD	Pts	Qualification
1	Spain	10	8	2	823	703	+120	18 (Note: Spain 156–156 Italy. Teams ranked on overall points difference.)	2023 FIBA Basketball World Cup
2	Italy	10	8	2	881	836	+45	18	2023 FIBA Basketball World Cup
3	Georgia	10	5	5	795	814	−19	15 (Note: Georgia 165–165 Iceland. Teams ranked on overall points difference.)	2023 FIBA Basketball World Cup
4	Iceland	10	5	5	786	842	−56	15	
5	Ukraine	10	4	6	811	797	+14	14	
6	Netherlands	10	0	10	712	816	−104	10	

Source: FIBA
Rules for classification: 1) Points; 2) Head-to-head results; 3) Points difference; 4) Points scored.
Notes:

24 August 2022	Ukraine	89–97	Italy	Riga, Latvia
18:30	Scoring by quarter: 19–19, 26–15, 22–38, 22–25
	Pts: Mykhailiuk 11; Rebs: Gerun, Lukashov 7 Asts: Lukashov 6	Boxscore	Pts: Fontecchio 20; Rebs: Melli, Spissu 6 Asts: Mannion 9	Arena: Arena Riga; Attendance: 1,700; Referees: Martin Horozov (BUL), Yener Yılmaz (TUR), Dariusz Zapolski (POL)

24 August 2022	Georgia	77–66	Netherlands	Tbilisi
19:00	Scoring by quarter: 18–18, 17–17, 21–9, 21–22
	Pts: Shengelia 20; Rebs: Mamukelashvili 10; Asts: McFadden 5	Boxscore	Pts: De Jong 22; Rebs: three players 6 Asts: Kloof 5	Arena: Tbilisi Sports Palace; Attendance: 8,000; Referees: Michał Proc (POL), Viola Györgyi (NOR), Gintaras Vitkauskas (LTU)

24 August 2022	Spain	87–57	Iceland	Pamplona
21:00	Scoring by quarter: 26–15, 25–13, 18–17, 18–12
	Pts: Hernangómez 19; Rebs: Saiz 9 Asts: Brown 9	Boxscore	Pts: Friðriksson 14; Rebs: Hlinason 7 Asts: Friðriksson, Vilhjálmsson 3	Arena: Pabellón de Arrosadia; Attendance: 7,548; Referees: Paulo Marques (POR), Gvidas Gedvilas (LTU), Péter Praksch (HUN)

27 August 2022	Netherlands	64–86	Spain	Almere
19:00	Scoring by quarter: 24–17, 8–23, 18–28, 14–18
	Pts: Kok 16; Rebs: three players 4 Asts: Van der Vuurst de Vries 5	Boxscore	Pts: Brizuela 13; Rebs: Garuba 6 Asts: López-Arostegui 6	Arena: Topsportcentrum; Attendance: 3,000; Referees: Yener Yılmaz (TUR), Erez Gurion (ISR), Dariusz Zapolski (POL)

27 August 2022	Iceland	91–88(OT)	Ukraine	Hafnarfjörður
20:00	Scoring by quarter: 14–19, 22–22, 27–14, 17–25, Overtime: 11–8
	Pts: Friðriksson 27; Rebs: Hlinason 7 Asts: Vilhjálmsson 5	Boxscore	Pts: Mykhailiuk 19; Rebs: Tkachenko 9 Asts: Mykhailiuk 6	Arena: Ásvellir; Attendance: 1,100; Referees: Boris Krejić (SLO), Oskars Lūcis (LAT), Péter Praksch (HUN)

27 August 2022	Italy	91–84	Georgia	Brescia
20:30	Scoring by quarter: 25–19, 18–19, 23–28, 25–18
	Pts: Fontecchio 21; Rebs: Fontecchio 8 Asts: Fontecchio 6	Boxscore	Pts: Bitadze 19; Rebs: Bitadze 13; Asts: Tsintsadze 11	Arena: PalaLeonessa; Attendance: 4,600; Referees: Georgios Poursanidis (GRE), Igor Mitrovski (MKD), Carsten Straube (GER)

11 November 2022	Netherlands	77–96	Ukraine	Almere
19:00	Scoring by quarter: 21–28, 14–31, 21–19, 21–18
	Pts: Van der Vuurst de Vries 19; Rebs: Kraag 7 Asts: Van der Vuurst de Vries 6	Boxscore	Pts: Sydorov 25; Rebs: three players 6 Asts: Lukashov 9	Arena: Topsportcentrum; Attendance: 2,002; Referees: Zafer Yılmaz (TUR), Blaž Zupančič (SLO), Ilias Kounelles (CYP)

11 November 2022	Iceland	85–88	Georgia	Reykjavík
19:35	Scoring by quarter: 17–26, 21–19, 25–15, 22–28
	Pts: Friðriksson 19; Rebs: Hlinason 10; Asts: Acox, Friðriksson 6	Boxscore	Pts: Shengelia 27; Rebs: Shengelia, Shermadini 11; Asts: McFadden 5	Arena: Laugardalshöll; Attendance: 2,511; Referees: Aleksandar Glišić (SRB), Martin Vulić (CRO), Geert Jacobs (BEL)

11 November 2022	Italy	84–88(OT)	Spain	Pesaro
21:00	Scoring by quarter: 18–22, 15–14, 16–19, 21–15, Overtime: 14–18
	Pts: Mannion 20; Rebs: Pajola, Ricci 4 Asts: Vitali 5	Boxscore	Pts: Fernández 28; Rebs: Parra 8 Asts: Díaz 7	Arena: Vitrifrigo Arena; Attendance: 10,000; Referees: Yohan Rosso (FRA), Kerem Baki (TUR), Péter Praksch (HUN)

14 November 2022	Ukraine	79–72	Iceland	Riga, Latvia
16:00	Scoring by quarter: 14–18, 21–15, 16–20, 28–19
	Pts: Lypovyy 16; Rebs: Herun, Tkachenko 10; Asts: Lukashov 6	Boxscore	Pts: Hlinason 24; Rebs: Hlinason 13; Asts: Þrastarson 4	Arena: Arena Riga; Attendance: 500; Referees: Igor Mitrovski (MKD), Mārtiņš Kozlovskis (LAT), Viola Györgyi (NOR)

14 November 2022	Georgia	84–85	Italy	Tbilisi
19:00	Scoring by quarter: 19–24, 21–19, 18–17, 26–25
	Pts: Shengelia 15; Rebs: Shermadini 9 Asts: Shengelia 6	Boxscore	Pts: Spissu, Tessitori 15; Rebs: Ricci 7 Asts: Spissu 8	Arena: Tbilisi Sports Palace; Attendance: 8,121; Referees: Ademir Zurapović (BIH), Zdravko Rutešić (MNE), Mehmet Karabilecen (TUR)

14 November 2022	Spain	84–72	Netherlands	Huelva
20:30	Scoring by quarter: 21–21, 22–22, 18–16, 23–13
	Pts: Brizuela 16; Rebs: Salvo 6 Asts: Fernandez 7	Boxscore	Pts: Schaftenaar 19; Rebs: three players 4 Asts: K. Van der Vuurst de Vries 5	Arena: Palacio de los Deportes Carolina Marín; Attendance: 4,123; Referees: Aleksandar Glišić (SRB), Martin Vulić (CRO), Josip Jurčević (CRO)

23 February 2023	Netherlands	80–88	Georgia	Almere
19:30	Scoring by quarter: 19–17, 23–18, 20–31, 18–22
	Pts: Kraag 23; Rebs: Kraag 9 Asts: Van der Vuurst de Vries 8	Boxscore	Pts: Shengelia 25; Rebs: Shengelia, Shermadini 6 Asts: three players 3	Arena: Topsportcentrum; Attendance: 3,000; Referees: Yener Yılmaz (TUR), Igor Mitrovski (MKD), Siniša Prpa (SRB)

23 February 2023	Iceland	61–80	Spain	Reykjavík
19:45	Scoring by quarter: 19–22, 14–21, 15–19, 13–18
	Pts: Hlinason 13; Rebs: Hlinason 7 Asts: Jónsson 6	Boxscore	Pts: Salvo 18; Rebs: Pérez 13; Asts: Bassas 6	Arena: Laugardalshöll; Attendance: 2,487; Referees: Zafer Yılmaz (TUR), Ivor Matějek (CZE), Carsten Straube (GER)

23 February 2023	Italy	85–75	Ukraine	Livorno
21:00	Scoring by quarter: 23–21, 20–22, 15–14, 27–18
	Pts: Mannion 28; Rebs: Severini 7 Asts: Spissu 7	Boxscore	Pts: Sanon 15; Rebs: Herun 7 Asts: four players 3	Arena: PalaLivorno; Attendance: 8,000; Referees: Aleksandar Glišić (SRB), Wojciech Liszka (POL), Martin Vulić (CRO)

26 February 2023	Spain	68–72	Italy	Cáceres
18:00	Scoring by quarter: 16–13, 13–20, 15–19, 24–20
	Pts: Pérez 15; Rebs: Núñez, Pérez 8 Asts: three players 3	Boxscore	Pts: Caruso 19; Rebs: Severini 9 Asts: Flaccadori, Spissu 4	Arena: Multiusos Ciudad de Cáceres; Attendance: 5,400; Referees: Gatis Saliņš (LAT), Martin Horozov (BUL), Péter Praksch (HUN)

26 February 2023	Ukraine	72–56	Netherlands	Riga, Latvia
18:00	Scoring by quarter: 18–17, 16–14, 23–8, 15–17
	Pts: Sanon 17; Rebs: Koniev 7 Asts: Sanon 5	Boxscore	Pts: Kraag 16; Rebs: Kraag 8 Asts: Van der Vuurst de Vries 9	Arena: Arena Riga; Attendance: 1,000; Referees: Oskars Lūcis (LAT), Dariusz Zapolski (POL), Ariadna Chueca (ESP)

26 February 2023	Georgia	77–80	Iceland	Tbilisi
20:00	Scoring by quarter: 19–19, 23–24, 18–19, 17–18
	Pts: Shermadini 23; Rebs: Shengelia, Shermadini 6 Asts: Shengelia, Tsintsadze 5	Boxscore	Pts: Friðriksson 25; Rebs: Guðmundsson 10; Asts: Steinarsson 5	Arena: Tbilisi Sports Palace; Attendance: 10,000; Referees: Georgios Poursanidis (GRE), Michał Proc (POL), Gvidas Gedvilas (LTU)
