= 2023 FIBA Basketball World Cup qualification (Europe) =

2023 FIBA Basketball World Cup
European Qualification

Tournament details
- Dates: 20 February 2020 – 27 February 2023
- Teams: 39

Official website
- European qualifiers website European pre-qualifiers website

The 2023 FIBA Basketball World Cup qualification for the FIBA Europe region, began in February 2020 and concluded in February 2023. The process determined the twelve teams that would qualify for the 2023 FIBA Basketball World Cup.

On 9 December 2019, the World Anti-Doping Agency initially handed Russia a four-year ban from all major sporting events, after RUSADA was found non-compliant for handing over manipulating lab data and lying to investigators. WADA prohibited the use of the Russian flag and anthem at major international sporting events. However, the Russia national team could still enter qualification, as the ban only applied to the final tournament to decide the world champions. Russia appealed the ruling to the Court of Arbitration for Sport (CAS), which ruled in favour of WADA on 17 December 2020, but cut the ban from four to two years. Had Russia qualified, its players would have been able to use its name, flag and anthem at the World Cup, as a result of the nation's two-year ban expiring on 16 December 2022. However, Russia was later expelled from the tournament due to its invasion of Ukraine in February 2022.

== Format ==
FIBA Europe was allocated 12 berths at the World Cup. In total, 39 FIBA Europe teams took part in the qualification tournament. The qualification consisted of the following stages:

- Pre-Qualifiers
  - First round: Eight teams that did not advance to the EuroBasket 2022 qualifiers took part.
  - Second round: The four teams were joined by the eight teams that were eliminated from the EuroBasket 2022 qualifiers. Teams that advanced from the previous round were assigned to Pot 3, while teams eliminated from EuroBasket 2022 qualifiers were assigned to Pots 1 or 2, according to FIBA rankings. Austria withdrew before the round and was replaced by Luxembourg.
- Qualifiers
  - First round: 24 teams that qualified for EuroBasket 2022 and eight teams that advanced from Pre-Qualifiers were organized into eight groups of four. The top three teams of each group qualified for the second round.
  - Second round: The top 24 teams from the first round were organised into four groups of six, with results carried over from the first round. The top three teams of each group qualified for the World Cup.

== Pre-qualifiers ==
Teams that did not advance to the EuroBasket 2022 qualifiers took part in the pre-qualifiers round.

=== First round ===
==== Group A ====
Pos	Team	Pld	W	L	PF	PA	PD	Pts	Qualification
1	Portugal	6	5	1	447	369	+78	11 (Note: Portugal 131–129 Belarus)	Pre-qualifiers second round
2	Belarus	6	5	1	498	347	+151	11	Pre-qualifiers second round
3	Cyprus	6	1	5	354	481	−127	7 (Note: Cyprus 152–137 Albania)	
4	Albania	6	1	5	391	493	−102	7	

Source: FIBA
Rules for classification: 1) Points; 2) Head-to-head results; 3) Points difference; 4) Points scored.

==== Group B ====
Pos	Team	Pld	W	L	PF	PA	PD	Pts	Qualification
1	Iceland	6	5	1	517	455	+62	11	Pre-qualifiers second round
2	Slovakia	6	3	3	467	459	+8	9	Pre-qualifiers second round
3	Luxembourg	6	2	4	481	495	−14	8 (Note: Luxembourg 179–173 Kosovo)	
4	Kosovo	6	2	4	455	511	−56	8	

Source: FIBA
Rules for classification: 1) Points; 2) Head-to-head results; 3) Points difference; 4) Points scored.

=== Second round ===
==== Group C ====
Pos	Team	Pld	W	L	PF	PA	PD	Pts	Qualification
1	Sweden	4	3	1	379	273	+106	7 (Note: Sweden 156–139 Portugal)	Qualifiers
2	Portugal (H)	4	3	1	302	304	−2	7	Qualifiers
3	Luxembourg (Note: Luxembourg replaced Austria, who withdrew before the start of the round.)	4	0	4	282	386	−104	4	

Source: FIBA
Rules for classification: 1) Points; 2) Head-to-head results; 3) Points difference; 4) Points scored.
(H) Hosts

==== Group D ====
Pos	Team	Pld	W	L	PF	PA	PD	Pts	Qualification
1	Latvia (H)	4	4	0	362	284	+78	8	Qualifiers
2	Belarus	4	2	2	314	313	+1	6	Qualifiers
3	Romania	4	0	4	279	358	−79	4	

Source: FIBA
Rules for classification: 1) Points; 2) Head-to-head results; 3) Points difference; 4) Points scored.
(H) Hosts

==== Group E ====
Pos	Team	Pld	W	L	PF	PA	PD	Pts	Qualification
1	Montenegro (H)	4	4	0	323	284	+39	8	Qualifiers
2	Iceland	4	2	2	329	308	+21	6	Qualifiers
3	Denmark	4	0	4	278	338	−60	4	

Source: FIBA
Rules for classification: 1) Points; 2) Head-to-head results; 3) Points difference; 4) Points scored.
(H) Hosts

==== Group F ====
Pos	Team	Pld	W	L	PF	PA	PD	Pts	Qualification
1	North Macedonia (H)	4	2	2	270	263	+7	6	Qualifiers
2	Slovakia	4	2	2	259	262	−3	6	Qualifiers
3	Switzerland	4	2	2	249	253	−4	6	

Source: FIBA
Rules for classification: 1) Points; 2) Head-to-head results; 3) Points difference; 4) Points scored.
(H) Hosts

== Qualifiers ==
=== First round ===
==== Group A ====
Pos	Team	Pld	W	L	PF	PA	PD	Pts	Qualification	LAT	BEL	SRB	SVK
1	Latvia	6	5	1	475	422	+53	11	Second round (Group I)	—	68–63	66–59	82–74
2	Belgium	6	4	2	460	392	+68	10	Second round (Group I)	65–66	—	73–69	102–59
3	Serbia	6	3	3	448	439	+9	9	Second round (Group I)	101–100	73–74	—	75–63
4	Slovakia	6	0	6	376	506	−130	6		60–93	57–83	63–71	—

Source: FIBA
Rules for classification: 1) Points; 2) Head-to-head results; 3) Points difference; 4) Points scored.

==== Group B ====
Pos	Team	Pld	W	L	PF	PA	PD	Pts	Qualification	GRE	TUR	GBR	BLR
1	Greece	4	3	1	310	287	+23	7	Second round (Group I)	—	72–71	93–71	Annu.
2	Turkey	4	2	2	307	286	+21	6	Second round (Group I)	67–76	—	84–67	Canc.
3	Great Britain	4	1	3	287	331	−44	5	Second round (Group I)	78–69	71–85	—	Canc.
4	Belarus (Note: Belarus was expelled, after beating Turkey 84–70 and losing against Greece 77–67.)	0	0	0	0	0	0	0	Expelled	Canc.	Annu.	Canc.	—

Source: FIBA
Rules for classification: 1) Points; 2) Head-to-head results; 3) Points difference; 4) Points scored.

==== Group C ====
Pos	Team	Pld	W	L	PF	PA	PD	Pts	Qualification	FIN	SLO	SWE	CRO
1	Finland	6	5	1	474	446	+28	11	Second round (Group J)	—	86–76	85–69	77–71
2	Slovenia	6	4	2	506	482	+24	10	Second round (Group J)	79–83	—	94–89	97–69
3	Sweden	6	2	4	479	494	−15	8	Second round (Group J)	72–62	81–84	—	98–105 (OT)
4	Croatia	6	1	5	462	499	−37	7		79–81	74–76	64–70	—

Source: FIBA
Rules for classification: 1) Points; 2) Head-to-head results; 3) Points difference; 4) Points scored.

==== Group D ====
Pos	Team	Pld	W	L	PF	PA	PD	Pts	Qualification	GER	ISR	EST	POL
1	Germany	6	5	1	474	425	+49	11	Second round (Group J)	—	84–80	66–69	93–83
2	Israel	6	3	3	476	452	+24	9	Second round (Group J)	67–71	—	96–77	69–61
3	Estonia	6	2	4	415	470	−55	8 (Note: Estonia 143–141 Poland)	Second round (Group J)	57–88	69–79	—	75–71
4	Poland	6	2	4	444	462	−18	8		69–72	90–85 (OT)	70–68	—

Source: FIBA
Rules for classification: 1) Points; 2) Head-to-head results; 3) Points difference; 4) Points scored.

==== Group E ====
Pos	Team	Pld	W	L	PF	PA	PD	Pts	Qualification	FRA	MNE	HUN	POR
1	France	6	5	1	464	343	+121	11	Second round (Group K)	—	73–67	81–40	94–56
2	Montenegro	6	4	2	464	428	+36	10	Second round (Group K)	70–69	—	84–88	83–69
3	Hungary	6	3	3	399	469	−70	9	Second round (Group K)	54–78	67–83	—	69–68
4	Portugal	6	0	6	386	473	−87	6		56–69	62–77	75–81	—

Source: FIBA
Rules for classification: 1) Points; 2) Head-to-head results; 3) Points difference; 4) Points scored.

==== Group F ====
Pos	Team	Pld	W	L	PF	PA	PD	Pts	Qualification	LTU	CZE	BIH	BUL
1	Lithuania	6	5	1	462	421	+41	11	Second round (Group K)	—	72–83	77–56	89–69
2	Czech Republic	6	3	3	485	483	+2	9 (Note: Czech Republic 183–178 Bosnia and Herzegovina)	Second round (Group K)	66–74	—	93–81	83–80
3	Bosnia and Herzegovina	6	3	3	472	486	−14	9	Second round (Group K)	77–78	97–90	—	76–73
4	Bulgaria	6	1	5	446	475	−29	7		70–72	79–70	75–85	—

Source: FIBA
Rules for classification: 1) Points; 2) Head-to-head results; 3) Points difference; 4) Points scored.

==== Group G ====
Pos	Team	Pld	W	L	PF	PA	PD	Pts	Qualification	ESP	GEO	UKR	MKD
1	Spain	6	5	1	504	402	+102	11	Second round (Group L)	—	89–61	88–74	80–44
2	Georgia	6	4	2	467	462	+5	10	Second round (Group L)	82–76 (OT)	—	88–83	91–70
3	Ukraine	6	3	3	463	448	+15	9	Second round (Group L)	76–77	79–66	—	78–61
4	North Macedonia	6	0	6	373	495	−122	6		65–94	65–79	68–73	—

Source: FIBA
Rules for classification: 1) Points; 2) Head-to-head results; 3) Points difference; 4) Points scored.

==== Group H ====
Pos	Team	Pld	W	L	PF	PA	PD	Pts	Qualification	ITA	ISL	NED	RUS
1	Italy	4	3	1	367	348	+19	7 (Note: Italy 200–194 Iceland)	Second round (Group L)	—	95–87	75–73	Canc.
2	Iceland	4	3	1	340	343	−3	7	Second round (Group L)	107–105	—	67–66	Canc.
3	Netherlands	4	0	4	297	313	−16	4	Second round (Group L)	81–92	77–79	—	Canc.
4	Russia (Note: Russia was expelled, after beating Italy 92–78, Iceland 89–65 and Netherlands 80–69.)	0	0	0	0	0	0	0	Expelled	Annu.	Annu.	Annu.	—

Source: FIBA
Rules for classification: 1) Points; 2) Head-to-head results; 3) Points difference; 4) Points scored.

=== Second round ===
==== Group I ====
Pos	Team	Pld	W	L	PF	PA	PD	Pts	Qualification	LAT	SRB	GRE	TUR	BEL	GBR
1	Latvia	10	9	1	807	707	+100	19	2023 FIBA Basketball World Cup	—	66–59	67–57	111–85	68–63	79–63
2	Serbia	10	6	4	825	803	+22	16 (Note: Serbia 192–191 Greece)	2023 FIBA Basketball World Cup	101–100	—	100–94 (OT)	77–76	73–74	101–83
3	Greece	10	6	4	775	764	+11	16	2023 FIBA Basketball World Cup	60–80	97–92 (OT)	—	72–71	85–68	93–71
4	Turkey	10	4	6	782	742	+40	14 (Note: Turkey 2–0 Belgium)		74–83	72–79	67–76	—	86–52	84–67
5	Belgium	10	4	6	679	717	−38	14		65–66	73–69	70–72	54–82	—	72–57
6	Great Britain	10	1	9	697	832	−135	11		80–87	68–74	78–69	71–85	59–88	—

Source: FIBA
Rules for classification: 1) Points; 2) Head-to-head results; 3) Points difference; 4) Points scored.

==== Group J ====
Pos	Team	Pld	W	L	PF	PA	PD	Pts	Qualification	GER	FIN	SLO	SWE	ISR	EST
1	Germany	12	10	2	960	854	+106	22	2023 FIBA Basketball World Cup	—	94–80	90–71	73–66	84–80	66–69
2	Finland	12	9	3	978	934	+44	21	2023 FIBA Basketball World Cup	81–87	—	86–76	85–69	79–73	91–71
3	Slovenia	12	7	5	994	958	+36	19	2023 FIBA Basketball World Cup	81–75	79–83	—	94–89	79–87	104–83
4	Sweden	12	5	7	919	939	−20	17		50–67	72–62	81–84	—	71–68	71–72
5	Israel	12	4	8	944	948	−4	16 (Note: Israel 2–0 Estonia)		67–71	95–97 (OT)	62–75	83–95	—	96–77
6	Estonia	12	4	8	870	977	−107	16		57–88	68–76	79–78	82–87	69–79	—

Source: FIBA
Rules for classification: 1) Points; 2) Head-to-head results; 3) Points difference; 4) Points scored.

==== Group K ====
Pos	Team	Pld	W	L	PF	PA	PD	Pts	Qualification	FRA	LTU	MNE	HUN	BIH	CZE
1	France	12	10	2	973	742	+231	22	2023 FIBA Basketball World Cup	—	70–63	73–67	81–40	92–56	95–60
2	Lithuania	12	9	3	922	852	+70	21	2023 FIBA Basketball World Cup	65–90	—	90–73	89–64	77–56	72–83
3	Montenegro	12	7	5	900	852	+48	19	2023 FIBA Basketball World Cup	70–69	56–65	—	84–88	88–69	88–70
4	Hungary	12	6	6	871	954	−83	18 (Note: Hungary 165–160 Bosnia and Herzegovina)		54–78	78–88	67–83	—	87–77	83–69
5	Bosnia and Herzegovina	12	6	6	927	987	−60	18		96–90 (2OT)	77–78	74–66	83–78	—	97–90
6	Czech Republic	12	3	9	878	968	−90	15		59–72	66–74	56–65	79–82	93–81	—

Source: FIBA
Rules for classification: 1) Points; 2) Head-to-head results; 3) Points difference; 4) Points scored.

==== Group L ====
Pos	Team	Pld	W	L	PF	PA	PD	Pts	Qualification	ESP	ITA	GEO	ISL	UKR	NED
1	Spain	10	8	2	823	703	+120	18 (Note: Spain 156–156 Italy. Teams ranked on overall points difference.)	2023 FIBA Basketball World Cup	—	68–72	89–61	87–57	88–74	84–72
2	Italy	10	8	2	881	836	+45	18	2023 FIBA Basketball World Cup	84–88 (OT)	—	91–84	95–87	85–75	75–73
3	Georgia	10	5	5	795	814	−19	15 (Note: Georgia 165–165 Iceland. Teams ranked on overall points difference.)	2023 FIBA Basketball World Cup	82–76 (OT)	84–85	—	77–80	88–83	77–66
4	Iceland	10	5	5	786	842	−56	15		61–80	107–105 (2OT)	85–88	—	91–88 (OT)	67–66
5	Ukraine	10	4	6	811	797	+14	14		76–77	89–97	79–66	79–72	—	72–56
6	Netherlands	10	0	10	712	816	−104	10		64–86	81–92	80–88	77–79	77–96	—

Source: FIBA
Rules for classification: 1) Points; 2) Head-to-head results; 3) Points difference; 4) Points scored.

==== Final standings ====
Qualifiers	Team(s)
Advanced to 2023 FIBA World Cup	Finland; France; Georgia; Germany; Greece; Italy; Latvia; Lithuania; Montenegro; Serbia; Slovenia; Spain
Eliminated from Second round	Belgium; Bosnia and Herzegovina; Czech Republic; Estonia; Great Britain; Hungary; Iceland; Israel; Netherlands; Sweden; Turkey; Ukraine
Eliminated from First round	Bulgaria; Croatia; North Macedonia; Poland; Portugal; Slovakia

Expelled teams: Belarus and Russia

== Statistical leaders ==
As of 27 February 2023

=== Player averages ===
Category	Player	Team	Average
Points	Elvar Már Friðriksson	Iceland	20.7
Rebounds	Tryggvi Hlinason	Iceland	10.0
Assists	Ludvig Håkanson	Sweden	7.4
Steals	Aleksa Avramović	Serbia	2.3
Blocks	Tryggvi Hlinason; Aleksander Balcerowski	Iceland; Poland	2.2
Minutes	Thaddus McFadden	Georgia	35.9
Efficiency	Tryggvi Hlinason	Iceland	22.8

=== Team averages ===
Category	Team	Average
Points	Italy	88.1
Rebounds	Ukraine	41.6
Assists	Spain	21.4
Steals	France	10.5
Blocks	France	4.3
Efficiency	France	100.8
