= Manos Chatzidakis (basketball) =

Greek basketball player

Manos Chatzidakis Μάνος Χατζηδάκης
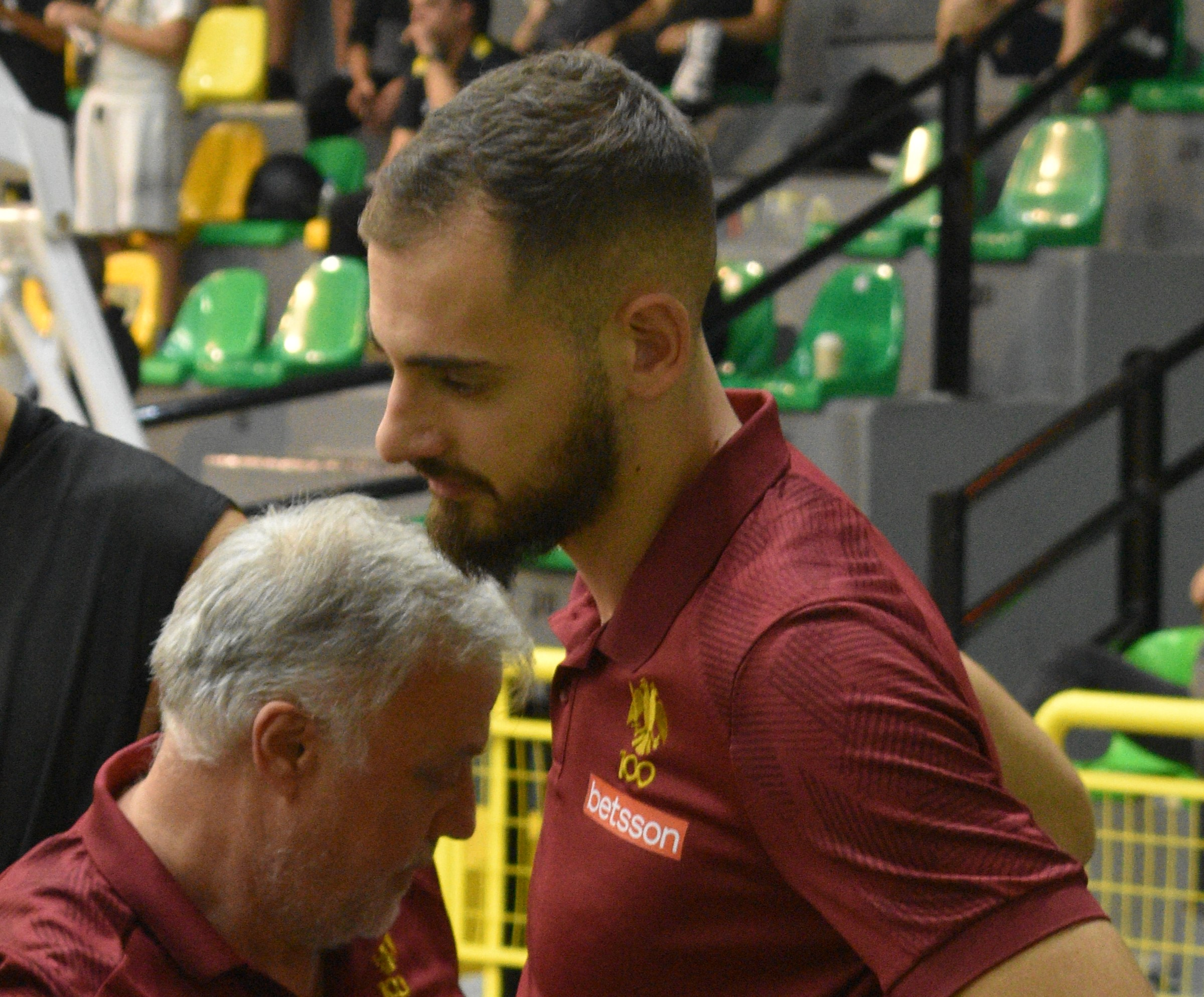
- Chatzidakis in 2023

No. 19 – Peristeri
- Position: Center
- League: Greek Basketball League

Personal information
- Born: April 21, 2000 (age 26) Leros, Greece
- Listed height: 6 ft 10 in (2.08 m)
- Listed weight: 240 lb (109 kg)

Career information
- Playing career: 2016–present

Career history
- 2016–2019: AEK Athens
- 2018–2019: →Maroussi
- 2019–2020: Koroivos Amaliadas
- 2020–2021: Maroussi
- 2021–2023: Kolossos Rodou
- 2023–2024: AEK Athens
- 2024–2025: Aris Thessaloniki
- 2025–2026: Maroussi
- 2026–present: Peristeri

Emmanouil "Manos" Chatzidakis (alternate spelling: Manos, Manolis, Hatzidakis, Hadjidakis) (Greek: Εμμανουήλ "Μάνος" Χατζηδάκης; born April 21, 2000) is a Greek professional basketball player for Peristeri of the Greek Basketball League. He is a 2.08 m (6 ft 10½ in) tall center.

== Youth career ==
Chatzidakis played from a young age with the youth teams of the Greek clubs Kronos Agios Dimitrios, Ikaros Kallitheas, and Panionios Leros, before he started his pro career.

== Professional career ==
On June 28, 2016, Chatzidakis moved to AEK Athens of the Greek League, where he signed a seven-year contract. On September 20, 2018, AEK loaned him to Maroussi of the Greek 2nd Division, in order for him to get more playing time. In his first game, he recorded 20 points, 7 rebounds, and 3 assists against Kavala. During the 2020–21 season with Maroussi, Chatzidakis averaged 9.1 points and 4 rebounds per contest, in 22 games played.

On July 9, 2021, Chatzidakis signed with the Greek First Division club Kolossos Rodou. In 24 games played, he averaged 3.2 points and 1.4 rebounds, while playing around 9 minutes per contest. On August 16, 2022, he renewed his contract with Kolossos for another two years. In 22 games played, he averaged 4.9 points and 2.7 rebounds, while playing around 14 minutes per contest.

On June 9, 2023, Chatzidakis made his return to AEK after four seasons.

On June 20, 2024, Chatzidakis signed a two-year deal with Aris. On July 22, 2025, he parted ways with the club.

== National team career ==
=== Greek junior national team ===
Chatzidakis played with the junior national teams of Greece at the 2016 FIBA Under-16 European Championship, the 2018 FIBA Under-18 European Championship, and the 2019 FIBA Under-19 World Cup.

=== Greek senior national team ===
Chatzidakis played with the senior Greek national team at the 2023 FIBA World Cup qualifiers. He was also selected to be a part of the national team in the 2023 FIBA Basketball World Cup.
