= Tryggvi Hlinason =

Icelandic basketball player

- Hlinason in 2026

No. 32 – Bilbao Basket
- Position: Center
- League: Liga ACB

Personal information
- Born: 28 October 1997 (age 29) Þingeyjarsveit, Iceland
- Listed height: 2.16 m (7 ft 1 in)
- Listed weight: 118 kg (260 lb)

Career information
- NBA draft: 2018: undrafted
- Playing career: 2014–present

Career history
- 2014–2017: Þór Akureyri
- 2017–2019: Valencia Basket
- 2017–2018: →Valencia Basket B
- 2018–2019: →Obradoiro
- 2019–2023: Zaragoza
- 2023–present: Bilbao Basket

Career highlights
- 2× FIBA Europe Cup champion (2025, 2026); 2× Icelandic Male Basketball Player of the Year (2024, 2025); Spanish Supercup winner (2017); Úrvalsdeild blocks leader (2017); Icelandic Division I champion (2016)
Medals
Men's basketball
Representing Iceland
Games of the Small States of Europe
Bronze medal – third place	2017 San Marino	Team

Tryggvi Snær Hlinason (born 28 October 1997) is an Icelandic professional basketball player for Bilbao Basket of the Liga ACB. He began his career in his home country, competing with Þór Akureyri. Tryggvi is a regular member of the Icelandic national team, with experience at EuroBasket. In 2024 and 2025, he was named the Icelandic Male Basketball Player of the Year.

== Early life ==
Tryggvi was raised on the Svartárkot farm, a sheep facility in the municipality of Þingeyjarsveit, an area of northeastern Iceland so isolated that his family's closest neighbors live 9 kilometres (5.6 mi) away, and there is no grocery store within an hour's drive of the farm. In a 2017 ESPN story, Jón Arnór Stefánsson, one of the country's greatest players, said about the area where Tryggvi was raised, "It's a situation you can't explain to a person that doesn't live in Iceland or that part of the country. When the weather is harsh, you can't really get to or from it, so you're just stuck up there. It's a unique story, man." Tryggvi himself would say in a 2018 interview with Yahoo Sports, "There was always work to do on the farm, but the freedom you have is insane. It's so far to the next house that you can do whatever you like and nobody really cares." One of his youth basketball coaches, Águst Guðmundsson, added that during winter, driving to and from the farm was sometimes impossible for two weeks or more at a time, even with four-wheel drive vehicles. During such conditions, the only access to the farm is by snowmobile.

In 2013, his parents decided to send him to secondary school in Akureyri, the main town of northern Iceland. The country has no basketball program in its secondary schools; his parents planned to have him learn as much as he could, especially in the electrical field, in order for him to help improve their farm operations. Shortly after his arrival in Akureyri, he called Bjarki Ármann Oddsson, then head coach of the under-17 team of Icelandic league club Þór Akureyri, wishing to give basketball a try—even though he owned no basketball shoes, and had never seen live full-court basketball. The coaches at Þór, plus Einar Jóhannsson, head coach of the Iceland U-18 national team, convinced Tryggvi's parents that he had a future in the sport.

== Professional career ==
=== Þór Akureyri (2014–2017) ===
Tryggvi signed with Division I club Þór Akureyri in 2014. He played sparingly during the first half of the season but averaged 10.8 points, 7.5 rebounds and 5.1 blocks in the final 8 games. In his second season, he averaged 12.8 points, 9.0 rebounds and 3.5 blocks and helped Þór Akureyri win Division I and achieve promotion to the Úrvalsdeild, the top-tier league in Iceland. After the season he was named to the Division I Domestic All-first team and as the D1 Young Player of the Year. Throughout his third and final season with Þór Akureyri, he led the Úrvalsdeild in blocked shots.

=== Valencia Basket (2017–2019) ===
In June 2017, Tryggvi signed with reigning Liga ACB champions, Valencia Basket. On 23 September 2017 he won the Spanish Supercup with Valencia. In December 2017 it was revealed that he finish second in voting for the Icelandic Men's Basketball Player of the Year award, after Martin Hermannsson. Throughout his first season with Valencia, Tryggvi would split his playing time between Valencia and their Liga EBA affiliate squad where he averaged 11.7 points and 9.8 rebounds. In June 2019, Valencia released Tryggvi from his contract.

==== NBA ====
On 16 April 2018 Tryggvi declared for the 2018 NBA draft, for which ESPN considered him a potential second-round pick. He was one of only 11 truly international players to declare for that year's draft early. He would ultimately go undrafted. He played for the Toronto Raptors during the 2018 NBA Summer League in Las Vegas, appearing in two games for them.

==== Loan to Obradoiro CAB (2018–2019) ====
Tryggvi spent the 2016–17 on a loan to Obradoiro where he averaged 3.5 points and 2.4 rebounds per game in 33 games in the Liga ACB.

=== Basket Zaragoza (2019–2023) ===
On 9 July 2019 Tryggvi signed a three-year deal with Spanish club Zaragoza. He led the Liga ACB in 2 point field goal percent over the 2020–21 season, making 75,2% of his shots, and again during the 2022–23 season, when he made 78.2%.

=== Bilbao Basket (2023–present) ===
On 5 July 2023, Tryggvi signed with Bilbao Basket.

On 20 December 2024, he was named the Icelandic Male Basketball Player of the Year.

In April 2025, he won the FIBA Europe Cup with Bilbao.

In December 2025, he was named the Icelandic Male Basketball Player of the Year for the second year in a row.

== Icelandic national team ==
Tryggvi was selected to the Icelandic men's national team in 2016 and helped Iceland qualify for FIBA EuroBasket 2017, which was their second appearance in the nation's history. He was also member of the Icelandic U20 national team that competed in the 2017 FIBA Europe Under-20 Championship, where he was named member of the All-Tournament Team. He led the tournament in blocks and efficiency, while coming in third in rebounds and seventh in scoring. Tryggvi became only the third 7-footer in the 21st century to average at least 14 points, 3 blocks, and 2 assists per 40 minutes at the European U-20s, after former NBA player Andris Biedriņš and 2017 NBA draft pick Anžejs Pasečņiks.

Einar commented on Tryggvi's development in the aforementioned ESPN piece: "In 40 months he goes from a kid in a farm who liked sports but never played basketball into being signed by Valencia. Amazing."

On 23 February 2020, Tryggvi had 26 points, 17 rebounds and 8 blocks in a victory against Slovakia in the 2023 FIBA Basketball World Cup pre-qualification. On 25 February 2022, Tryggvi had 34 points, 21 rebounds and 5 blocked shots in a double overtime victory against Italy in the 2023 FIBA Basketball World Cup qualification.

== Career statistics ==
=== National team ===
Team	Tournament	Pos.	GP	PPG	RPG	APG
Iceland	EuroBasket 2017	24th	5	4.2	2.6	0.4
Iceland	EuroBasket 2025	22nd	5	14.6	10.8	1.8

== Honours ==
=== Spain ===
==== Club ====
- Spanish Supercup winner (2017)

==== Individual ====
- Liga ACB two point field goal percent leader: 2021, 2023

=== Iceland ===
==== Club ====
- Icelandic Division I champion: 2016

==== Individual ====
- Úrvalsdeild karla blocks leader: 2017
- Icelandic Division I blocks leader: 2015, 2016
- Icelandic Division I Domestic All-first team: 2016
- Icelandic Division I Young Player of the Year: 2016

=== International ===
- FIBA Europe U20 Championship All-Tournament Team: 2017
