= Tomáš Kyzlink =

Czech basketball player (born 1993)

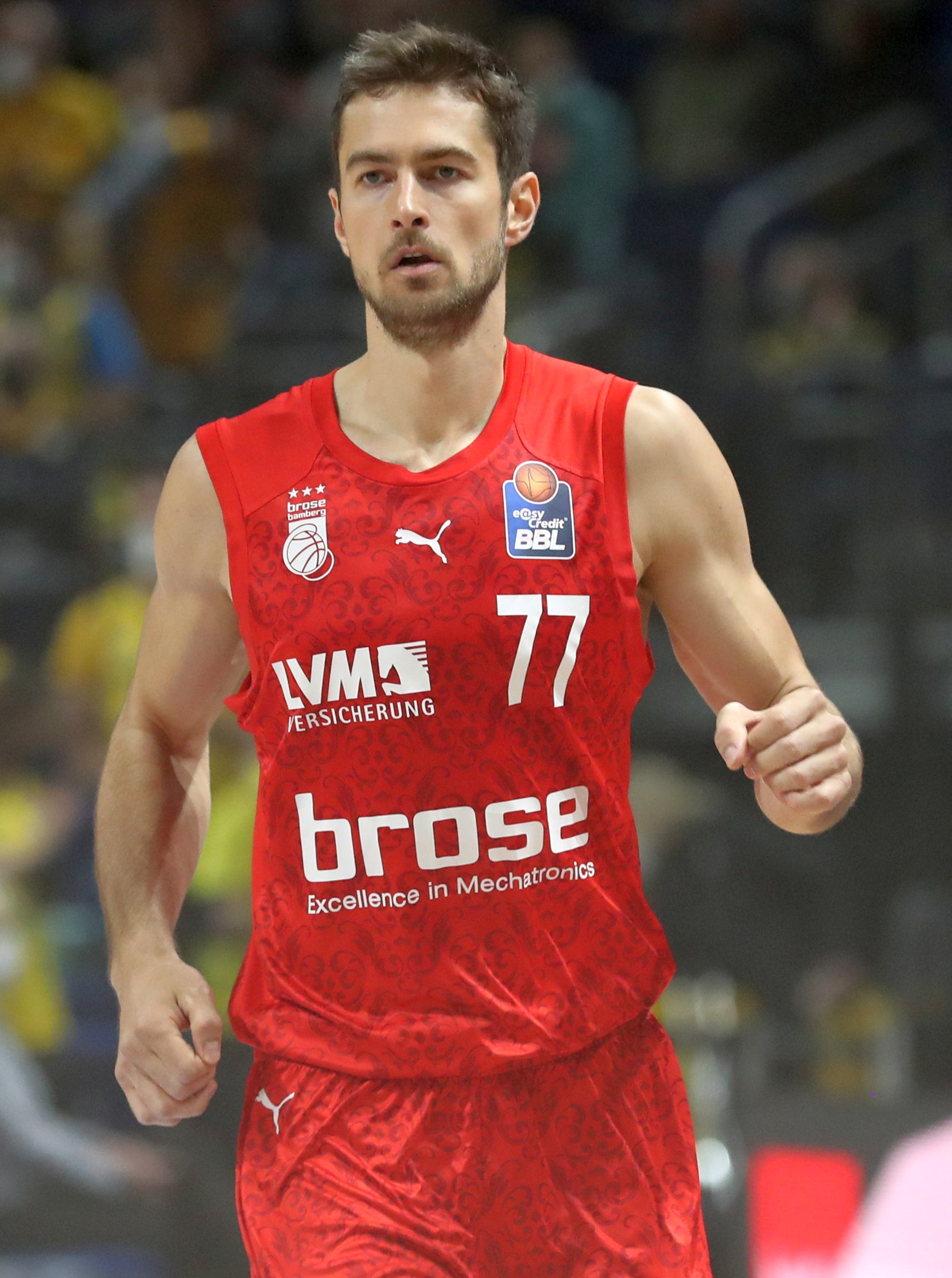
- Kyzlink in 2022

No. 77 – USK Praha
- Position: Shooting guard
- League: National Basketball League

Personal information
- Born: 18 June 1993 (age 33) Vyškov, Czech Republic
- Listed height: 1.96 m (6 ft 5 in)
- Listed weight: 90 kg (198 lb)

Career information
- NBA draft: 2015: undrafted
- Playing career: 2011–present

Career history
- 2009–2012: USK Praha
- 2011–2012: →Benešov
- 2012–2013: Càceres
- 2012–2013: →Estudiantes II
- 2013–2016: Blu Treviglio
- 2016–2017: Helios Suns
- 2017: JL Bourg
- 2017–2019: Reyer Venezia
- 2018: →Mens Sana
- 2019–2020: Virtus Roma
- 2020–2021: Pallacanestro Reggiana
- 2021: USK Praha
- 2021–2022: Brose Bamberg
- 2023: Limoges CSP
- 2023–2024: New Basket Brindisi
- 2024: Anwil Włocławek
- 2024: Suke Lions
- 2024–2025: Jilin Northeast Tigers
- 2025: Suke Lions
- 2026: Beijing Royal Fighters
- 2026: Jiaozuo Cultural Tourism
- 2026–present: USK Praha

Tomáš Kyzlink (born 18 June 1993) is a Czech basketball player for USK Praha of the National Basketball League.

== Professional career ==
He averaged 12.7 points per game during the 2019–20 season with Virtus Roma.

Kyzlink signed a 1+1 contract with Pallacanestro Reggiana on 27 June 2020. He used the exit option, and therefore left the team, at the end of the season.

On 20 September 2021, Kyzlink returned to Czech Republic signing with USK Praha.

On 3 January 2023, he signed with Limoges CSP.

On 9 January 2024, he signed with Anwil Włocławek of the Polish Basketball League (PLK).

In 2024, National Basketball League season, Kyzlink played 22 games for Jiangsu Yannan Suke, he won 3-point scoring leader by averaged 3.8 3-point per game.

On 19 October 2024, Kyzlink signed with Jilin Northeast Tigers of the Chinese Basketball Association (CBA).

== National team career ==
He participated at the EuroBasket 2017.
