= Buggy =

Buggy may refer to:

== Fictional characters ==
- Buggy the Clown, in the One Piece manga and anime

== Vehicles ==
- Buggy (automobile)
  - Dune buggy or beach buggy
- Buggy (carriage), a horse-drawn vehicle
  - Chief's buggy, a 19th-century fire chief's vehicle
- Gravity racer or buggy, an unmotorised go-kart
- Kite buggy, powered by a traction kite

== Other uses ==
- Buggy (surname)
- Baby carriage or buggy
- Shopping buggy or shopping cart
- Buggy, a class of off-road radio-controlled cars
- Buggy, a U.S. nuclear test under Operation Crosstie

== See also ==
- Bug (disambiguation)
- Buggie (disambiguation)
- Bugsy (disambiguation)
- Bogey (disambiguation)
- Bogy (disambiguation)
- Boogie (disambiguation)
- Bougy (disambiguation)
- Moon Buggy
- Bugatti
