= Boog =

Boog may refer to:

== People ==
=== Surname ===
- Adolf von Boog (1866–1929), Austro-Hungarian Army officer who served in World War I
- Horst Boog (1928–2016), German historian
- Rik van den Boog (born 1959), Dutch football manager and former player
- Sean Boog, half of the hip hop duo The Away Team

=== Nickname ===
- Dennis Highberger (born 1959), American politician
- Boog Powell (born 1941), American professional baseball player
- Boog Powell (outfielder) (1993), American professional baseball player
- Jon Sciambi (born 1970), American sportscaster

=== Ring name ===
- Rick Boogs, American professional wrestler Eric Bugenhagen (born 1987)

== Fictional characters ==
- Boog, the main character of the Open Season film series
- Boogregard "Boog" Shlizetti, a bully in Fanboy & Chum Chum, an American animated television series

== See also ==
- J-Boog, a member of the American boy band B2K
- Booge, South Dakota
- Boogie (disambiguation)
- Booger (disambiguation)
- Boogey (disambiguation)
- Böögg, an effigy of winter burned during the Swiss spring holiday Sechseläuten
