= Buginese =

Buginese may refer to:

- Bugis people, or Buginese, an ethnic group of South Sulawesi, Indonesia
  - Buginese language
    - Buginese script, or Lontara script
    - Buginese (Unicode block), a block of Unicode characters for the Buginese script

== See also ==
- Bugis (disambiguation)
