= 2014 Serbia FIBA Basketball World Cup team =

- Head coach: Aleksandar Đorđević
- 2014 FIBA World Cup: Silver

The 2014 Serbia FIBA Basketball World Cup team represented Serbia at the 2014 FIBA Basketball World Cup in Spain. Serbia qualified for the World Cup by taking the 7th place in the 2013 EuroBasket. The Serbian team won the silver medal at the tournament.

== Roster ==
On 23 July 2014, coach Aleksandar Đorđević announced a preliminary squad for the World Cup. Due to injury Vladimir Lučić, Vasilije Micić, Ognjen Kuzmić and Nemanja Dangubić canceled their participation at the end of July. On 19 August 2014, Nemanja Nedović was ruled out due to a foot injury. On 24 August 2014, Vladimir Micov left the national team, before the final roster was published two days later. The following is the Serbia roster for the World Cup.

Serbia men's national basketball team - 2014 FIBA Basketball World Cup roster
Players
Coaches

Pos.	No.	Name	Age – Date of birth	Height	Club	Ctr.
G	4	Miloš Teodosić	27 – 19 March 1987	1.95 m (6 ft 5 in)	CSKA Moscow	(Russia)
F	5	Marko Simonović	28 – 30 April 1986	2.03 m (6 ft 8 in)	Red Star Belgrade	(Serbia)
G	6	Stefan Jović	23 – 3 November 1990	1.96 m (6 ft 5 in)	Radnički Kragujevac	(Serbia)
G	7	Bogdan Bogdanović	22 – 18 August 1992	1.97 m (6 ft 6 in)	Partizan	(Serbia)
F	8	Nemanja Bjelica	26 – 9 May 1988	2.09 m (6 ft 10 in)	Fenerbahçe	(Turkey)
G	9	Stefan Marković	26 – 25 April 1988	1.91 m (6 ft 3 in)	Banvit	(Turkey)
F	10	Nikola Kalinić	22 – 8 November 1991	2.02 m (6 ft 8 in)	Radnički Kragujevac	(Serbia)
F	11	Stefan Birčević	24 – 12 December 1989	2.10 m (6 ft 11 in)	Radnički Kragujevac	(Serbia)
C	12	Nenad Krstić	31 – 25 July 1983	2.12 m (6 ft 11 in)	CSKA Moscow	(Russia)
C	13	Miroslav Raduljica	26 – 5 January 1988	2.13 m (7 ft 0 in)	Milwaukee Bucks	(United States)
C	14	Raško Katić	33 – 8 December 1980	2.08 m (6 ft 10 in)	Red Star Belgrade	(Serbia)
C	15	Vladimir Štimac	27 – 25 August 1987	2.11 m (6 ft 11 in)	Unicaja Málaga	(Spain)

Head coach

- Aleksandar Đorđević

Assistant coach(es)

- Jovica Antonić
- Milan Minić
- Miroslav Nikolić

Legend

- Club – describes last
  club before the tournament
- Age – describes age
  on 30 August 2014

== Staff ==
Position	Staff member	Age	Team
Head coach	(Serbia) Aleksandar Đorđević	47	—
Assistant coaches	(Serbia) Jovica Antonić	48	(Serbia) Konstantin
Assistant coaches	(Serbia) Milan Minić	35	(Greece) Aris Thessaloniki
Assistant coaches	(Serbia) Miroslav Nikolić	58	(Serbia) Radnički Kragujevac
Team manager	(Serbia) Nebojša Ilić	46	(Serbia) Crvena zvezda mts
Conditioning coach	(Serbia) Srđan Sarić	—	—
Scouts	(Serbia) Dragan Popov	—	—
Scouts	(Serbia) Goran Topić	47	(Serbia) Crvena zvezda mts
Physician	(Serbia) Dragan Radovanović	—	—
Physiotherapists	(Serbia) Dušan Sajić	—	—
Physiotherapists	(Serbia) Velibor Kosanović	—	(Serbia) Vršac
Equipment manager	(Serbia) Jovica Aničić	—	—
Press officer	(Serbia) Vladimir Sibinović	—	—

Age – describes age on 30 August 2014

Source: KSS

== Uniform ==
- Supplier: Peak
- Main sponsor: SuisseGas
- Back sponsor: Komercijalna banka
- Shorts sponsor: mts

Home	Away

== Tournament ==
=== Preliminary round ===
In their first game, Serbia had an easy win against Egypt, with Miloš Teodosić scoring 15 points to lead the Serbs. The Serbs then faced France in their next game. The French trailed at halftime, but Edwin Jackson converted three three-pointers to keep France close. Boris Diaw tied the game with four seconds left, then Joffrey Lauvergne scored from the free-throw line, to give Serbia their first loss. In the next game, Hamed Haddadi's 29 points weren't enough for Iran, as Serbia won 83–70. Haddadi was foiled when Serbia forced him to commit his fourth foul, just before halftime. Although the Serbian players who guarded Haddadi also battled foul trouble, they pulled through in the end. The Serbs then lost to Brazil, with Marcus Vieira making 6 three-point shots. Serbia were assured of a final round berth by their last group game against Spain, but lost 73–89, to finish fourth in the group.

Qualified for the final round

Pos	Team	Pld	W	L	PF	PA	PD	Pts	Qualification
1	Spain (H)	5	5	0	440	314	+126	10	Round of 16
2	Brazil	5	4	1	416	333	+83	9	Round of 16
3	France	5	3	2	376	357	+19	8	Round of 16
4	Serbia	5	2	3	387	378	+9	7	Round of 16
5	Iran	5	1	4	344	406	−62	6	
6	Egypt	5	0	5	311	486	−175	5	

Source: FIBA archive
Rules for classification: 1) points; 2) head-to-head points; 3) head-to-head goal average; 4) head-to-head number of points scored.
(H) Hosts

All times are local UTC+2.

==== Egypt ====
This was the first competitive game between Egypt and Serbia.

30 August 2014
15:30

Boxscore

Egypt	64–85	Serbia
Scoring by quarter: 13–21, 18–22, 12–25, 21–17
Pts: El-Gammal 12; Rebs: Elmekawi 5 Asts: El-Sabagh 5		Pts: Teodosić 15; Rebs: Birčević 9 Asts: three players 4

Palacio Municipal de Deportes de Granada, Granada
Attendance: 3,000
Referees: Jorge Vázquez (PUR), Rüştü Nuran (TUR), Michael Weiland (CAN)

==== France ====
This was the first game between Serbia and France in the World Cup. The two teams have met twice in the EuroBasket, with France winning in 2011, and Serbia winning in 2013.

31 August 2014
15:30

Boxscore

Serbia	73–74	France
Scoring by quarter: 21–20, 21–14, 20–26, 11–14
Pts: Raduljica 21; Rebs: Raduljica 7 Asts: Teodosić 5		Pts: Lauvergne 19; Rebs: Batum 6 Asts: Heurtel 6

Palacio Municipal de Deportes de Granada, Granada
Attendance: 7,070
Referees: Guerrino Cerebuch (ITA), Borys Ryzhyk (UKR), Jorge Vázquez (PUR)

==== Iran ====
This was the first competitive game between Iran and Serbia.

1 September 2014
15:30

Boxscore

Iran	70–83	Serbia
Scoring by quarter: 18–21, 20–21, 13–25, 19–16
Pts: Haddadi 29; Rebs: Haddadi 5 Asts: Nikkhah 7		Pts: Bjelica 18; Rebs: Bjelica 10; Asts: Teodosić 9

Palacio Municipal de Deportes de Granada, Granada
Attendance: 6,597
Referees: Christos Christodoulou (GRE), Vaughan Mayberry (AUS), Rüştü Nuran (TUR)

==== Brazil ====
This was the first competitive game between Serbia and Brazil.

3 September 2014
18:00

Boxscore

Serbia	73–81	Brazil
Scoring by quarter: 16–23, 16–25, 32–12, 9–21
Pts: Teodosić 14; Rebs: Bjelica, Raduljica 5 Asts: Teodosić 5		Pts: Vieira 21; Rebs: Varejão 9 Asts: Splitter 6

Palacio Municipal de Deportes de Granada, Granada
Attendance: 4,122
Referees: Christos Christodoulou (GRE), Vaughan Mayberry (AUS), Michael Weiland (CAN)

==== Spain ====
This was the second meeting between Serbia and Spain in the World Cup. Serbia defeated Spain in their meeting at the 2010 FIBA World Championship. Spain won the last competitive game against Serbia at the FIBA EuroBasket 2013.

4 September 2014
22:00

Boxscore

Serbia	73–89	Spain
Scoring by quarter: 20–34, 15–20, 21–17, 17–18
Pts: Bjelica 19; Rebs: Bjelica 10; Asts: Bogdanović 4		Pts: P. Gasol 20; Rebs: M. Gasol 8 Asts: Rubio 6

Palacio Municipal de Deportes de Granada, Granada
Attendance: 8,559
Referees: Anthony Jordan (USA), Rüştü Nuran (TUR), Jorge Vázquez (PUR)

=== Final round ===
Serbia faced Group B winners Greece in the round of 16. After the Greeks had their first lead of the game late in the first half, Nikola Kalinić scored on a three-point play that gave them the lead for good. Serbia limited Greece to 13 points in the third quarter, en route to a win. Bogdan Bogdanović had a game-high 21 points, and four other Serbs scored in double figures, to send Serbia to the quarterfinals. All Group A teams qualified to the quarterfinals, with Brazil netting a rematch with Serbia. With Brazil within striking distance throughout the game, Tiago Splitter and Nenê were assessed technical fouls in the third quarter; Serbia had a seven-point possession, and never trailed again. France then defeated Spain, to arrange a rematch with Serbia in the semifinals. Serbia had a 9–0 run in the second period, to give them a 30–15 advantage. France cut the lead to ten, early in the fourth quarter. Boris Diaw, Nicolas Batum and Evan Fournier made three-pointers, to cut the deficit to four points, with five minutes left. Teodosić and Bogdanović scored their own three-pointers, to pad the lead to nine, when the French converted more three-pointers to cut the lead to three, with 48 seconds left. Thomas Heurtel converted both free-throws to cut the lead to one point, but Teodosić missed a field-goal. Heurtel split his free-throws off Teodosić's foul, then Serbia scored four points, Batum made a three-pointer for France, and Marko Simonović made both free-throws to seal the win for Serbia.

==== Round of 16 ====
This would be Serbia's and Greece's first World Cup game against each other. Greece had previously won their last competitive match at FIBA EuroBasket 2011.

7 September 2014
18:00

Boxscore

Serbia	90–72	Greece
Scoring by quarter: 23–20, 23–22, 18–13, 26–17
Pts: Bogdanović 21; Rebs: Bjelica 10; Asts: Teodosić 5		Pts: Calathes 14; Rebs: Kaimakoglou 6 Asts: Printezis 5

Palacio de Deportes de la Comunidad de Madrid, Madrid
Attendance: 13,100
Referees: Michael Aylen (AUS), Robert Lottermoser (GER), Stephen Seibel (CAN)

==== Quarterfinals ====
This would be the second time in this tournament that these two teams met. Brazil earlier defeated Serbia in the preliminary round.

10 September 2014
18:00

Boxscore

Serbia	84–56	Brazil
Scoring by quarter: 21–17, 16–15, 29–12, 18–12
Pts: Teodosić 23; Rebs: Bjelica 8 Asts: Bjelica 5		Pts: Varejão 12; Rebs: Varejão 9 Asts: Huertas 9

Palacio de Deportes de la Comunidad de Madrid, Madrid
Attendance: 12,550
Referees: Steven Anderson (USA), José Reyes (MEX), Borys Ryzhyk (UKR)

==== Semifinals ====
This would be the second time in this tournament that these two teams met. France earlier defeated Serbia in the preliminary round.

12 September 2014
22:00

Boxscore

France	85–90	Serbia
Scoring by quarter: 15–21, 17–25, 14–15, 39–29
Pts: Batum 35; Rebs: Diaw 10; Asts: Heurtel 6		Pts: Teodosić 24; Rebs: Bjelica 7 Asts: Bjelica, Marković 5

Palacio de Deportes de la Comunidad de Madrid, Madrid
Attendance: 13,470
Referees: Cristiano Maranho (BRA), Alejandro Chiti (ARG), Christos Christodoulou (GRE)

=== Final ===
In the final Serbia hit their first seven shots from the field and jumped out to a quick 15-7 lead. The advantage was short lived as the U.S went on a 14-0 run with all the points scored by Kyrie Irving and James Harden. Irving finished the first half with 18 points on 7 of 9 shooting from the field. He made all four of his three point attempts in the first half. DeMarcus Cousins, subbing for Anthony Davis who picked up two quick fouls, dominated the boards. As a team, the Americans made 12 of their first 16 treys.

14 September 2014
21:00

Boxscore

United States	129–92	Serbia
Scoring by quarter: 35–21, 32–20, 38–26, 24–25
Pts: Irving 26; Rebs: Cousins 9 Asts: Rose 6		Pts: Bjelica, Kalinić 18; Rebs: Marković 6 Asts: Teodosić 7

Palacio de Deportes de la Comunidad de Madrid, Madrid
Attendance: 13,673
Referees: Stephen Seibel (CAN), Borys Ryzhyk (UKR), Eddie Viator (FRA)

=== Statistics ===
Legend
GP	Games played	GS	Games started	MPG	Minutes per game
FG%	Field-goal percentage	3FG%	3-point field-goal percentage	FT%	Free-throw percentage
RPG	Rebounds per game	APG	Assists per game	SPG	Steals per game
BPG	Blocks per game	PPG	Points per game	EF	PIR per game

Player	GP	GS	MPG	FG%	3FG%	FT%	RPG	APG	SPG	BPG	EF	PPG
Stefan Birčević												
Nemanja Bjelica												
Bogdan Bogdanović												
Stefan Jović												
Nikola Kalinić												
Raško Katić												
Nenad Krstić												
Stefan Marković												
Miroslav Raduljica												
Marko Simonović												
Vladimir Štimac												
Miloš Teodosić												
Total												

Source: FIBA Basketball World Cup
