= Bogie (disambiguation) =

A bogie is part of a rail vehicle.

Bogie may also refer to:

== Places ==
- Bogie, Queensland, Australia, a locality in the Whitsunday Region
- Bogie, a river in Queensland, Australia - see Bogie River Hills
- River Bogie, Scotland
- 15495 Bogie, an asteroid

== People ==
=== Nickname ===
- Humphrey Bogart (1899–1957), American actor
- Xander Bogaerts (born 1992), Aruban baseball player
- Bogie Roberts, a footballer in the late 1890s
- Moshe Ya'alon (born 1950), Israeli former politician, Defense Minister and Chief of the General Staff of the Israel Defense Forces

=== Surname ===
- Bogie (surname)

== Other uses ==
- Boca Ciega High School, a senior high school in Gulfport, Florida, colloquially called Bogie
- Bogie, an attendant of Jack in the Green, a character in traditional English May Day parades and other May celebrations
- Bogies (game), a recurring feature in the Dick & Dom in da Bungalow British television show for children
- The Bogies, a comic strip in The Dandy
- GWR Bogie Class, a Great Western Railway class of passenger steam locomotives
- A type of flatbed trolley for moving bulk loads

== See also ==
- Bogie Cottage, Saranac Lake, New York, on the National Register of Historic Places
- Bogey (disambiguation)
- Bogy (disambiguation)
- Boogie (disambiguation)
- Bougie (disambiguation)
- Buggie (disambiguation)
