= 2014 FIBA Basketball World Cup final round =

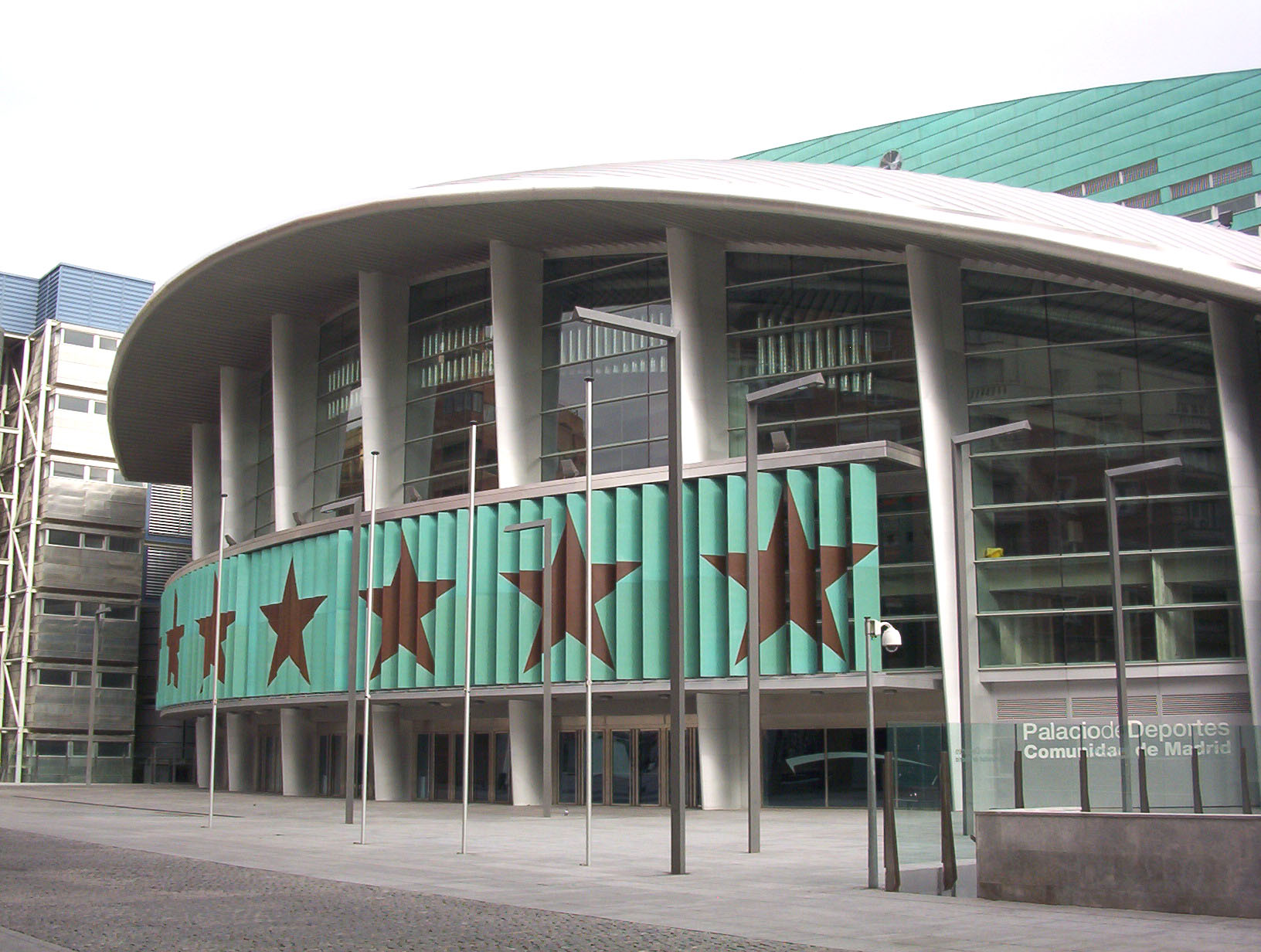
Palacio de Deportes de la Comunidad de Madrid, Madrid

Palau Sant Jordi, Barcelona

The final round of the 2014 FIBA Basketball World Cup is the knockout stage of the competition. The top four teams from the preliminary round groups shall qualify in the single-elimination tournament. The losers in the semifinals will play for the bronze medal. Teams from Groups A and B shall play at the Palacio de Deportes de la Comunidad de Madrid in Madrid, while those from Groups C and D shall play at the Palau Sant Jordi in Barcelona. The third place game and the final shall be held at the Madrid arena.

The order of games for the round of 16 and quarterfinals shall be determined after the teams are known.

== Qualified teams ==
Group	Winner	2nd place	3rd place	4th place
A	Spain	Brazil	France	Serbia
B	Greece	Croatia	Argentina	Senegal
C	United States	Turkey	Dominican Republic	New Zealand
D	Lithuania	Slovenia	Australia	Mexico

== Bracket ==
Round of 16
6 September – Madrid
Spain	89
Senegal	56
6 September – Madrid
Croatia	64
France	69
7 September – Madrid
Greece	72
Serbia	90
7 September – Madrid
Brazil	85
Argentina	65
6 September – Barcelona
United States	86
Mexico	63
6 September – Barcelona
Slovenia	71
Dominican Republic	61
7 September – Barcelona
Lithuania	76
New Zealand	71
7 September – Barcelona
Turkey	65
Australia	64

Quarter-finals
10 September – Madrid
Spain	52
France	65
10 September – Madrid
Serbia	84
Brazil	56
9 September – Barcelona
United States	119
Slovenia	76
9 September – Barcelona
Lithuania	73
Turkey	61

Semi-finals
12 September – Madrid
France	85
Serbia	90
11 September – Barcelona
United States	96
Lithuania	68

Final
14 September – Madrid
Serbia	92
United States	129
Third place
13 September – Madrid
France	95
Lithuania	93

All times are local UTC+2.

== Round of 16 ==
=== United States vs. Mexico ===
This would be the third game between the United States and Mexico in the World Cup; the United States won the first two games in 1963 and 1967. The most recent competitive game between the two was an American victory at the 2007 FIBA Americas Championship.

Team USA rolled past Mexico in the first game of the final round. Stephen Curry scored 20 points, including 6 three point field goals, for the United States. Gustavo Ayón recorded 25 points and 8 rebounds for Mexico.

6 September 2014
16:00

Boxscore

United States	86–63	Mexico
Scoring by quarter: 23–13, 19–14, 24–11, 20–25
Pts: Curry 20; Rebs: Faried 8 Asts: Curry, Rose 4		Pts: Ayón 25; Rebs: Ayón 8 Asts: Gutiérrez 3

Palau Sant Jordi, Barcelona
Attendance: 14,200
Referees: Eddie Viator (FRA), Carlos Julio (ANG), Oļegs Latiševs (LAT)

=== France vs. Croatia ===
This would be France's and Croatia's first World Cup game against each other. The French had previously won their last competitive match at FIBA EuroBasket 2009.

6 September 2014
18:00

Boxscore

France	69–64	Croatia
Scoring by quarter: 7–15, 16–7, 23–12, 23–30
Pts: Batum 14; Rebs: Gelabale 6 Asts: Diaw 5		Pts: Bogdanović 27; Rebs: Šarić 7 Asts: Lafayette 6

Palacio de Deportes de la Comunidad de Madrid, Madrid
Attendance: 12,600
Referees: Anthony Jordan (USA), José Reyes (MEX), Borys Ryzhyk (UKR)

=== Dominican Republic vs. Slovenia ===
This would be the first competitive game between the Dominican Republic and Slovenia.

6 September 2014
20:00

Boxscore

Dominican Republic	61–71	Slovenia
Scoring by quarter: 15–15, 13–23, 20–16, 13–17
Pts: Feldeine 18; Rebs: Martínez 11; Asts: Feldeine 3		Pts: Z. Dragić 18; Rebs: Slokar 6 Asts: G. Dragić 6

Palau Sant Jordi, Barcelona
Attendance: 10,324
Referees: Christos Christodoulou (GRE), Alejandro Chiti (ARG), Juan González (ESP)

=== Spain vs. Senegal ===
This would be Spain's and Senegal's first World Cup game against each other. Spain had previously defeated Senegal at the 1980 Olympics, their last competitive game between the two of them.

6 September 2014
22:00

Boxscore

Spain	89–56	Senegal
Scoring by quarter: 23–17, 18–11, 21–15, 27–13
Pts: P. Gasol 17; Rebs: M. Gasol, Ibaka 6 Asts: Rubio 6		Pts: Faye, Badji 12; Rebs: three players 7 Asts: D'Almeida 4

Palacio de Deportes de la Comunidad de Madrid, Madrid
Attendance: 13,400
Referees: Sreten Radović (CRO), Matej Boltauzer (SLO), Robert Lottermoser (GER)

=== New Zealand vs. Lithuania ===
This would be the second competitive game between New Zealand and Lithuania at the World Cup; the Lithuanians had won the first meeting at the 2010 FIBA World Championship.

7 September 2014
16:00

Boxscore

New Zealand	71–76	Lithuania
Scoring by quarter: 9–23, 17–13, 24–22, 21–18
Pts: C. Webster 26; Rebs: Vukona 10; Asts: Penney 3		Pts: Valančiūnas 22; Rebs: Valančiūnas 13; Asts: Seibutis 5

Palau Sant Jordi, Barcelona
Attendance: 7,783
Referees: Ilija Belošević (SRB), Alejandro Chiti (ARG), Ferdinand Pascual (PHI)

=== Serbia vs. Greece ===
This would be Serbia's and Greece's first World Cup game against each other. Greece had previously won their last competitive match at FIBA EuroBasket 2011.

7 September 2014
18:00

Boxscore

Serbia	90–72	Greece
Scoring by quarter: 23–20, 23–22, 18–13, 26–17
Pts: Bogdanović 21; Rebs: Bjelica 10; Asts: Teodosić 5		Pts: Calathes 14; Rebs: Kaimakoglou 6 Asts: Printezis 5

Palacio de Deportes de la Comunidad de Madrid, Madrid
Attendance: 13,100
Referees: Michael Aylen (AUS), Robert Lottermoser (GER), Stephen Seibel (CAN)

=== Turkey vs. Australia ===
This would be the second competitive game between Turkey and Australia at the World Cup; Turkey had won the first meeting at the 2006 FIBA World Championship.

7 September 2014
20:00

Boxscore

Turkey	65–64	Australia
Scoring by quarter: 15–18, 19–17, 12–15, 19–14
Pts: Güler, Preldžić 16; Rebs: Preldžić 7 Asts: Tunçeri 3		Pts: Baynes 15; Rebs: Baynes 7 Asts: Dellavedova 5

Palau Sant Jordi, Barcelona
Attendance: 6,339
Referees: Cristiano Maranho (BRA), Steven Anderson (USA), Oļegs Latiševs (LAT)

=== Brazil vs. Argentina ===
This would be the second consecutive time that these two teams will meet in a World Cup round of 16; Argentina won in 2010. Argentina won in the last competitive game at the 2011 FIBA Americas Championship.

7 September 2014
22:00

Boxscore

Brazil	85–65	Argentina
Scoring by quarter: 13–21, 20–15, 24–13, 28–16
Pts: Neto 21; Rebs: Varejão 9 Asts: Varejão, Nenê 4		Pts: Prigioni 18; Rebs: Scola 7 Asts: Scola, Prigioni 3

Palacio de Deportes de la Comunidad de Madrid, Madrid
Attendance: 13,450
Referees: Luigi Lamonica (ITA), Sreten Radović (CRO), Jorge Vázquez (PUR)

== Quarterfinals ==
=== Lithuania vs. Turkey ===
This would be the third time Lithuania and Turkey played against each other at the World Cup. Turkey won their first two games, both at the 2006 FIBA World Championship.

9 September 2014
17:00

Boxscore

Lithuania	73–61	Turkey
Scoring by quarter: 13–18, 20–10, 14–16, 26–17
Pts: Seibutis 19; Rebs: Valančiūnas 13; Asts: Seibutis, Pocius 3		Pts: Gönlüm 13; Rebs: Aşık 10; Asts: Preldžić 5

Palau Sant Jordi, Barcelona
Attendance: 9,752
Referees: Juan González (ESP), Stephen Seibel (CAN), Eddie Viator (FRA)

=== United States vs. Slovenia ===
This would be the third competitive game between the United States and Slovenia. The Americans have won both previous meetings, at the 2006 and 2010 FIBA World Championship.

9 September 2014
21:00

Boxscore

Slovenia	76–119	United States
Scoring by quarter: 22–29, 20–20, 22–37, 12–33
Pts: G. Dragić 13; Rebs: Balažič, Lorbek 6 Asts: G. Dragić 4		Pts: Thompson 20; Rebs: Davis 11; Asts: Rose 5

Palau Sant Jordi, Barcelona
Attendance: 13,674
Referees: Cristiano Maranho (BRA), Robert Lottermoser (GER), Ferdinand Pascual (PHI)

=== Serbia vs. Brazil ===
This would be the second time in this tournament that these two teams met. Brazil earlier defeated Serbia in the preliminary round.

10 September 2014
18:00

Boxscore

Serbia	84–56	Brazil
Scoring by quarter: 21–17, 16–15, 29–12, 18–12
Pts: Teodosić 23; Rebs: Bjelica 8 Asts: Bjelica 5		Pts: Varejão 12; Rebs: Varejão 9 Asts: Huertas 9

Palacio de Deportes de la Comunidad de Madrid, Madrid
Attendance: 12,550
Referees: Steven Anderson (USA), José Reyes (MEX), Borys Ryzhyk (UKR)

=== Spain vs. France ===
This would be the second time in this tournament that these two teams met. Spain earlier defeated France in the preliminary round.

10 September 2014
22:00

Boxscore

France	65–52	Spain
Scoring by quarter: 15–15, 20–13, 7–15, 23–9
Pts: Diaw 15; Rebs: Gobert 13; Asts: Heurtel, Diot 4		Pts: P. Gasol 17; Rebs: P. Gasol 8 Asts: Fernández 3

Palacio de Deportes de la Comunidad de Madrid, Madrid
Attendance: 13,673
Referees: Luigi Lamonica (ITA), Michael Aylen (AUS), Oļegs Latiševs (LAT)

== Semifinals ==
=== Lithuania vs. United States ===
This would be the second consecutive time that both teams would meet in a World Cup semifinal; in 2010, the Americans won en route to the championship. The last time the two teams met was a USA victory in the 2012 Olympics.

11 September 2014
21:00

Boxscore

United States	96–68	Lithuania
Scoring by quarter: 21–16, 22–19, 33–14, 20–19
Pts: Irving 18; Rebs: Gay 7 Asts: Irving 4		Pts: Valančiūnas, Kuzminskas 15; Rebs: Kuzminskas 9 Asts: Juškevičius, Seibutis 2

Palau Sant Jordi, Barcelona
Attendance: 15,070
Referees: José Reyes (MEX), Matej Boltauzer (SLO), Sreten Radović (CRO)

=== France vs. Serbia ===
This would be the second time in this tournament that these two teams met. France earlier defeated Serbia in the preliminary round.

12 September 2014
22:00

Boxscore

France	85–90	Serbia
Scoring by quarter: 15–21, 17–25, 14–15, 39–29
Pts: Batum 35; Rebs: Diaw 10; Asts: Heurtel 6		Pts: Teodosić 24; Rebs: Bjelica 7 Asts: Bjelica, Marković 5

Palacio de Deportes de la Comunidad de Madrid, Madrid
Attendance: 13,470
Referees: Cristiano Maranho (BRA), Alejandro Chiti (ARG), Christos Christodoulou (GRE)

== Third place playoff ==
13 September 2014
18:00

Boxscore

Lithuania	93–95	France
Scoring by quarter: 19–22, 23–21, 29–21, 22–31
Pts: Valančiūnas 25; Rebs: Valančiūnas 9 Asts: Seibutis 4		Pts: Batum 27; Rebs: Lauvergne 9 Asts: Diaw 4

Palacio de Deportes de la Comunidad de Madrid, Madrid
Attendance: 11,800
Referees: Steven Anderson (USA), Ilija Belošević (SRB), Juan González (ESP)

== Final ==
In the final Serbia hit their first seven shots from the field and jumped out to a quick 15-7 lead. The advantage was short lived as the U.S went on a 14-0 run with all the points scored by Kyrie Irving and James Harden. Irving finished the first half with 18 points on 7 of 9 shooting from the field. He made all four of his three point attempts in the first half. DeMarcus Cousins, subbing for Anthony Davis who picked up two quick fouls, dominated the boards. As a team, the Americans made 12 of their first 16 treys.

14 September 2014
21:00

Boxscore

United States	129–92	Serbia
Scoring by quarter: 35–21, 32–20, 38–26, 24–25
Pts: Irving 26; Rebs: Cousins 9 Asts: Rose 6		Pts: Bjelica, Kalinić 18; Rebs: Marković 6 Asts: Teodosić 7

Palacio de Deportes de la Comunidad de Madrid, Madrid
Attendance: 13,673
Referees: Stephen Seibel (CAN), Borys Ryzhyk (UKR), Eddie Viator (FRA)
