= Bougie (disambiguation) =

Bougie is the city of Béjaïa, Algeria.

Bougie may also refer to:

== People with the surname Bougie ==
- Jacques Bougie (born 1947), Manager and CEO of Alcan (1979–2000), mentioned in relation to 1981 Manitoba general election
- Jean Bougie (1886–1918), Canadian ice hockey player
- Louis-Pierre Bougie (1946–2021), Canadian painter and engraver

== Other uses ==
- Bougie (medical instrument), a medical instrument used in esophageal dilatation
- Slang for bourgeoisie, a wealthy social class
- "Bougie", a song by Lil Durk from the album Love Songs 4 the Streets 2
- bougie, French word for candle
- Nickname for Isaac Herzog, the president of Israel

== See also ==
- Bougy (disambiguation)
- Bogie (disambiguation)
- Boogie (disambiguation)
- Buggie (disambiguation)
