= 2014 United States World Cup team =

2014 United States World Cup team may refer to:

- United States men's national soccer team in the 2014 FIFA World Cup
- 2014 United States FIBA Basketball World Cup team
