= Buggie =

Buggie may refer to:

- A baby carriage, pram or shopping cart
- Haufe HA-G-1 Buggie, an American glider design
- Buggie, the mascot of Bugzilla

== See also ==
- Buggy (disambiguation)
- Boogie (disambiguation)
- Bogie (disambiguation)
- Bougie (disambiguation)
