= Bugi (disambiguation) =

Bugi is a village in Warmian-Masurian Voivodeship, Poland.

Bugi may also refer to:

- Lontara alphabet, ISO 15924 code Bugi
- Buginese language, an Indonesian language also known as Bugi
- Agob language, a Papuan language
- Nambu language, a Papuan language
- Saint Bugi, 6th century Welsh Christian saint
- Kensei: Sacred Fist, a fighting video game known as Bugi in Japan

== See also ==
- Bugis (disambiguation)
- Boogie (disambiguation)
