= Bogey =

Bogey may refer to:

== People ==
Nickname

- Humphrey Bogart (1899–1957), American actor
- Xander Bogaerts (born 1992), Aruban professional baseball player
- Wilton Gaynair (1927–1995), Jamaican jazz musician
- Lionel Protip Sen (1910–1981), Indian Army lieutenant-general

Surname

- Robert Bogey (born 1935), French former long-distance runner

== Arts and entertainment ==
- Bogey (comics), a character in Spanish comics
- Bogey Orangutan, a character in the Shirt Tales cartoons
- Bogey, a villain in the English-language French animated series A.T.O.M.

== Sports ==
- Bogey (golf), a score of one over par on a hole in the sport of golf
- Bogey, another name for a gravity racer

== Other uses ==
- "Bogey", a multiservice tactical brevity code for an unidentified radar or visual air contact
- "Bogey", an RAF Second World War code name for an unidentified aircraft
- Bogey, an Australian Aboriginal word for bath
- Bogey, slang for dried nasal mucus
- Bogey Hole, an ocean pool in Newcastle, Australia
- Bogey or Bogeyman, a mythical monster
- Another word for devil

== See also ==
- Bogie (disambiguation)
- Bogy (disambiguation)
- Boogie (disambiguation)
