= Bogie (surname) =

Bogie is a surname. Notable people with the surname include:

- Cam Bogie (1915–2006), Australian rules footballer
- David Bogie (born 1987), British rally driver
- Ian Bogie (born 1967), British former football player and manager
- Les Bogie (1911–1983), Australian rules footballer
- Malcolm Bogie (born 1939), Scottish former footballer
- Stuart Bogie, American musician

== See also ==
- Robert Bogey (born 1935), French long-distance runner
