= Rik van den Boog =

Dutch footballer

Rik van den Boog (born in Amsterdam, 1 September 1959) is a Dutch manager and former football player. After several positions in Xerox, Libertel, Vodafone, Orange. After becoming a shareholder in The Entertainment Group (TEG), he became the General Manager of AFC Ajax in November 2008, a position he relinquished on 1 June 2011.

== Earlier careers ==
Van den Boog, a footballer, went through Ajax's youth academy from 1975 to 1983. He entered its second team. An ankle injury meant the end of his football career. He completed his teacher training at J.W. Willems in 1985 and went to work for Rank Xerox from 1986 to 1999, when he became a member of the Board of Directors of Libertel. After Vodafone Netherlands took over Libertel, Van den Boog became its director of distribution. He left Vodafone in August 2002, according to the management for personal reasons. He had a short career position in Orange Netherlands from 2003 to 2004 as a director of commerce.

In 2005 he became co-shareholder of The Entertainment Group (TEG). Before he could start at Ajax, he had to divest the TEG's Sports Entertainment Group (SEG) division that represented footballers and trainers. The TEG company went bankrupt in September 2009.

== At AFC Ajax ==
Van den Boog became general manager at AFC Ajax on November 17, 2008 succeeding Henri van der Aat, who acted as interim director after the departure of general manager Maarten Fontein. Van den Boog's appointment was as per final recommendations of the "Coronel report". He came under fire at the beginning of 2011 after he refrained from following recommendations from a working group led by Johan Cruijff. With the rift growing, Cruijff repeatedly voiced direct criticism of Van den Boog. On 17 April 2011, Van den Boog announced that he was canceling his contract with AFC Ajax. He left the club on 1 June 2011. He was succeeded in November 2011 by Martin Sturkenboom, who would act on an interim basis until Louis van Gaal took over the club as general manager.

== After Ajax ==
After Ajax, van den Boog became the managing director of VanRiet Material Handling Systems, resigning in 2018.
