= Bougy (disambiguation) =

Bougy is a commune in Calvados, France.

Bougy may also refer to:

== Places ==
- Bougy-lez-Neuville, commune in Loire, France
- Bougy-Villars, municipality in Vaud, Switzerland
- Alfred de Bougy (1815-1874), French poet

== See also ==
- Bogy (disambiguation)
- Bougie (disambiguation)
- Buggy (disambiguation)
