= Boogie (disambiguation) =

Boogie is a musical technique or rhythm.

Boogie may also refer to:

== Music ==
- Boogie (genre), a post-disco genre from 1980s
- Boogie rock, a genre of rock which reached the height of its popularity in the 1970s
- Boogie-woogie, piano-based music style popular from the late 1920s

=== Albums ===
- Boogie (album), a compilation album by The Jackson 5

=== Songs ===
- "Boogie" (song), by Brockhampton
- "Boogie", 2011 single by Mandy Rain
- "Boogie Oogie Oogie", a song by A Taste of Honey

== People ==
- Boogie (photographer) (born 1969), Serbian-American photographer
- Boogie (rapper) (born 1989), American hip-hop artist
- Wang Ziyi (born 1996), a Chinese rapper with the stagename "BOOGIE"
- Boogie, nickname of DeMarcus Cousins (born 1990), American basketball player
- Boogie2988, nickname of Steven Jay Williams (born 1974), American YouTube personality
- BooG!e, nickname of Bobby K. Bowman, American actor
- Boogie Basham (born 1997), American football player
- Boogie Ellis (born 2000), American basketball player
- Boogie Knight (born 1999), American football player

== Film and fictional characters ==
- Boogie, the oily (Spanish: Boogie el aceitoso), a character from comic strips in Argentina, created by Roberto Fontanarrosa
- Boogie (2008 film), Romanian dramedy directed by Radu Muntean, starring Dragoş Bucur and Anamaria Marinca
- Boogie (2009 film), Argentine animated film based on the comic strip character, Boogie, the oily
- Boogie (2021 film), American drama film written and directed by Eddie Huang, starring Taylor Takahashi, Taylour Paige and Jorge Lendeborg Jr.

== Games ==
- Boogie (video game), a video game for the Wii, DS and PlayStation 2
- Boogie Superstar, a sequel to Boogie

== Other uses ==
- Boogie man, alternate spelling of bogeyman
- Boogie boogie boogie!, expression used by Dick Cavett and Groucho Marx
- Booger (mucus), the United States slang term for nasal mucus

== See also ==
- Bogey (disambiguation)
- Bogie (disambiguation)
- Buggie (disambiguation)
- Buggy (disambiguation)
- Bugi (disambiguation)
- Bougie (disambiguation)
