= Bogy (disambiguation) =

Bogy is a commune of the Ardèche department in southern France.

Bogy may also refer to:

- Lewis V. Bogy (1813 – 1877), a United States Senator from Missouri
- Bogy-Chenault, Kentucky, an unincorporated community within Montgomery County, Kentucky, United States
- Bogy (footballer) (born 1989), an Egyptian footballer
- MC Bogy (born 1979), a German rapper

== See also ==
- Bogie (disambiguation)
- Bogey (disambiguation)
- Bougy (disambiguation)
- Buggy (disambiguation)
