= Buggy (surname) =

Buggy is a surname. Notable people with the surname include:

- Eileen Buggy, Irish make-up artist and hairstylist
- Hugh Buggy (1896–1974), Australian journalist
- Ned Buggy (born 1948), Irish hurler
- Niall Buggy (born 1948), Irish actor
- Paddy Buggy (1929–2013), Irish hurler
- Regina Buggy (born 1959), American field hockey player
