= List of A.T.O.M. characters =

A.T.O.M. is an English-language French action animated series created by Ariane Desrieux and Paul-Patrick Duval. The show takes place in the fictional Landmark City and focuses on five teenagers, the eponymous Alpha Teens on Machines, who are given prototype weapons, gadgets and vehicles in order to battle Alexander Paine, a man who threatens to destroy Landmark City.

== Alpha Teens ==
The Alpha Teens are teenagers who participated in a TV contest and won. Their prize was being hired by Mr. Lee to use his prototype devices.

=== Axel Manning ===
Axel Manning (voiced by James Arnold Taylor) is the eighteen-year-old leader of A.T.O.M., and a master of the Jo-Lan martial art. Jo-Lan combines the body and mind, allowing each punch, kick, etc. to land with a burst of energy. When Axel was 8, his father, Sebastian Manning, was supposedly killed in an explosion by who was assumed to be Paine, but later found to be someone else. Axel still searches for the truth on what really happened.

Axel enjoys adventure and will push his body to its limits. Just like the rest of the team, he likes extreme sports. Possibly the team's most level-headed member, Axel feels bad when he feels he put someone in danger and for a long time, blamed himself for his father's death. He and King become close friends and he also seems to have feelings for Lioness, as she is the only one who can get through to him when he is particularly emotional.

=== King ===
Crey "King" Kingston (voiced by Aldis Hodge) is nineteen years old and is the oldest member of the team. He is a gentle giant with superhuman strength who is skilled in various forms of wrestling such as Greco-Roman wrestling, submission wrestling and pro-wrestling. King can rip through doors and walls with little effort; his power equals that of Axel when Axel uses his Jo-Lan special attacks. King also is tech savvy with computers, which he has shown on more than one occasion.

His father brought him to Blue Pines National Park in the outskirts of Landmark City. The experience changed him to the King that he is now. King also loves animals and has had many exotic pets including Sparky (a gopher), Clarence (a tree frog), Benny (a porcupine), and Fluffy (a bat). King has also temporarily housed other animals at various periods of time and loves to nurse them back to health.

=== Lioness ===
Catalina "Lioness" Leone (voiced by Alli Mauzey) is the youngest on the team at the age of eighteen. She is a talented Brazilian songwriter and singer who practices capoeira. Her agility and athletic ability make her a very effective fighter. She can hold her own in battle and has exhibited more courage than the others, mainly Hawk and Shark.

Like Axel, Lioness thrives on challenge and will push her body to its limits. Lioness had two fears, Paine's powers and public speaking, both of which she eventually overcame. She grew up with four brothers, Alexander, Antonio, Edvardo, and Fernando. Lioness' father Rico Leone, known as Thrash, is a rock star and comes to visit her in one episode.

=== Hawk ===
Zack "Hawk" Hawkes (voiced by Charlie Schlatter) is an eighteen-year-old gifted test pilot who is more at home in the air than on the ground, both due to his piloting skill and his huge ego. He is not too much of a hand-to-hand fighter. He has used a Muay Thai fighting stance more than once, getting knocked down each time he did it. He also was not able to swim until Lioness and a lifeguard named Laura taught him the basics.

Before his time with the Alpha Teens, Hawk was enrolled in a flight school, where he developed a rivalry with another pilot named Bogey. They pushed each other to see who was the best pilot, but Bogey's actions almost got them both killed. Both were expelled after Bogey put all the blame on Hawk for the incident during an inquest.

Hawk's aforementioned ego often annoys the rest of the team (and almost everybody else he meets) and sometimes is counterproductive on their missions. Because of this, he often strikes out with the ladies, including Lioness when he tried to pick her up when they first met. Despite this, Hawk is very serious about protecting innocent lives as well as his piloting skills.

=== Shark ===
Ollie Herbert "Shark" Sharker (voiced by Brian Donovan) is an eighteen-year-old laid back surfer who is most at home in the water. A student of oceanography, Shark's is a great asset during water-based missions or while testing water-based vehicles for Lee Industries. Like Hawk, Shark isn't very accomplished fighter, but he is very skilled at evasion due to his knowledge of balance and the reflexes he gained from surfing. While most of the time, Shark is a calm and relaxed individual, when Axel was poisoned by Paine's men, he proved himself to be an effective leader.

== Antagonists ==
=== Paine's gang ===
Paine's gang is a criminal group that serves as the main antagonist of the first season.

==== Alexander Paine ====
Alexander Paine (voiced by Clancy Brown) is a crime boss who seeks to take over Landmark City and serves as the main antagonist of the first season. He is a former covert ops spy for the government, and worked closely with Axel Manning's father, Sebastian Manning. After the apparent death of Sebastian, Paine was sentenced to life imprisonment. However, he only served ten years before escaping with help from Spydah. Paine soon encounters Sebastian's son Axel, who seeks revenge for Sebastian's death. Due to a freak accident that Axel accidentally caused, Paine's nervous system is damaged. Because of this, he is in constant pain, but has the ability to transfer his intense pain to whomever he touches. Controlling a group of convicts from Talon, including Spydah and Flesh, Paine seeks to cause chaos and disorder in Landmark City, giving him an opportunity to take it over.

==== Spydah ====
Roger "Spydah" Marcel (voiced by Tom Kenny) is a minion of Paine in spider-like armor who broke out of jail with him. He can create insect-themed machines which he treats as his pets. Spydah wears a helmet equipped with six mini-cameras with night vision and infra-red capabilities. His eight detachable mechanical arms provide him with strength, dexterity, and climbing ability. Spydah is also Paine's tech expert building or retooling machine's for Paine's plans.

==== Flesh ====
Albert "Flesh" (voiced by Bill Fagerbakke) is initially a bodybuilding thug who idolizes Paine and is hired by him to steal Nutronium from Lee Industries. After the mission fails, Paine angrily throws chemicals across the room, which strike Albert. This caused his body to mutate and grow to brutish proportions, giving him immense strength. Taking the name Flesh, an insult used by Lioness, Albert stayed working with Paine full-time.

=== Dragon ===
Dragon (voiced by Keith Szarabajka) is a ninja mercenary, the only Eastern Jo-Lan master, and is first seen when he was hired by unknown clientele to steal an inhibitor that drains its wearer of their strength. He met Paine when he and Paine were unexpectedly robbing the same place. Paine sent Spydah and Flesh to take care of him only for Dragon to easily defeat them both. An impressed Paine knew he was both a Jo-Lan master and a mercenary and tripled his pay to give him the inhibitor and capture Axel Manning.

In "Fathers and Sons", Dragon is revealed to be a clone of Sebastian Manning, created by Lee during the Chrysalis project.

=== Magness ===
Samantha "Magness" Paine (voiced by Kari Wahlgren) is the daughter of Alexander Paine. She has had magnetic powers since birth. The extent of which is her ability to control most metals (gold being one exception), disrupting electronics, levitation and canceling Jo-Lan powers. Her magnetic powers are increased in extreme cold, i.e. a snowy mountain. But her powers are weakened by extreme heat, i.e. fire. Magness also knows martial arts to the point where she can keep up with Axel in a fair fight. While Magness is Paine's daughter, she is not officially part of his gang.

=== Janus Lee ===
Janus Lee (voiced by Tom Kenny) is the inventor and founder of Lee Industries. A rich and successful businessman, he held various assets throughout the city and over 6,000 separate patents on inventions. He was the one who started the Alpha Teens team after he tested them on his game show, "Trackdown" in season 1. He gave them access to Lee Industries vehicles for testing and also let them use them to stop Paine or any other villain threatening Landmark City. In both cases the vehicles usually end up getting trashed, mostly being unintentional, but Lee always paid for new ones.

Throughout the first season, the Alpha Teens become suspicious of Lee and eventually discover that he has created Tilian, a reptilian clone of Axel. Lee explains to Axel that his work on Tilian began shortly after their first meeting, citing his protégé as the direct inspiration for a messianic mission to save humanity from destroying itself. To ensure this transition happens without resistance, Lee intends to create creatures less conspicuous than Tilian who can blend in with humanity. After his actions are exposed, Lee experiments on himself, leaving him unable to think or act rationally. Lee creates an armor made out of hard light technology (light images that actual can come in physical contact with solid and liquid materials).

In "The Serpent's Tale", Lee is mortally wounded by Dragon's attack, which uncontrollably combines him with the hard light energy from his suit. This essentially reverses the effects of the failed self-experimentation that had driven him insane. Quan visits Lee in an attempt to silence him permanently by using his Ju Lan to disrupt Lee's Ki energy, causing a mass explosion that seemingly kills Lee. However, Lee survives as a being made of pure light.

==== Mu-Team ====
The Mu-Team are genetically-altered clones of the Alpha Teens by Mr. Lee who each sports the characteristics of various animals. They are fiercely loyal to Mr. Lee and are very aggressive.

===== Tilian =====
Tilian (voiced by James Arnold Taylor) is a clone of Axel who was created with the DNA of a cobra, a crocodile, a gecko, and a chameleon and sports a reptilian appearance. He possesses crocodile-like armor and super-strength, can generate paralyzing venom like a spitting cobra and communicate with other snakes, change color to blend in the surfaces like a chameleon as well as extending his tongue, and regenerate lost limbs like a gecko. In later appearances, Tilian is upgraded with a thick reptilian tail.

===== Wrecka =====
Wrecka (voiced by Aldis Hodge) is a clone of King who was created with the DNA of an elephant, a rhinoceros, and a hippopotamus. He has a largely humanoid appearance with blue skin, dreadlocks, and a horn. Wrecka possesses immense strength of all three animals, the charging power of an elephant and a rhinoceros, and the durability of a hippopotamus. In later episodes, Wrecka is upgraded with another horn and the ability to generate electricity from his horn.

===== Firekat =====
Firekat (voiced by Alli Mauzey) is a clone of Lioness who was created with the DNA of a cheetah, a lion, a cougar, and a tiger and sports a feline appearance with tiger-like stripes. Firekat has immense speed equivalent to a cheetah and the jumping ability, powerful retractable claws, and the ability to see in the dark shared by the other three cats. In later episodes, Firekat is upgraded with longer claws.

===== Stingfly =====
Stingfly (voiced by Charlie Schlatter) is a clone of Hawk who was created with the DNA of a hornet, a wasp, a dragonfly, and a beetle and sports an insectoid appearance with large compound eyes. Stingfly is able to fly like a hornet and a dragonfly, stick to walls like a beetle, shoot acidic eggs from his hornet-like abdomen, and emit a powerful shriek like a wasp. In later episodes, Stingfly is upgraded to have additional arms.

===== Rayza =====
Rayza (voiced by Brian Donovan) is a clone of Shark who was created with the DNA of a piranha, an eel, a jellyfish, and a barracuda, giving him a fish-like appearance. Rayza is amphibious, possesses a powerful bite from his piranha/barracuda teeth, emit energy blasts from his lower arms like a jellyfish, and can emit bio-electricity from his body like an electric eel. In later episodes, Rayza is upgraded to have a more fish-like head and fin-like blades on his arms.

=== Cannonball Bros. ===
The Cannonball Brothers (both voiced by James Arnold Taylor) are sibling acrobats who were prisoners at Talon Penitentiary until Paine broke them out. They worked for a circus where they would pickpocket valuables from their audience after the shows. Paine came to them stating that they owed him for breaking them out.

=== Architect ===
Silas Greene (voiced by Yuri Lowenthal) is a genius designer at Lee Plaza who was fired before the completion of the project. Greene stated that Lee was going to say that he was imbalanced as the reason of his termination. Greene takes control of the plaza and weaponizes its drones, robotic cleaners, and other contents to attack Lee with.

==== Dr. Recombo ====
Dr. Recombo (voiced by Danny Mann) is a genetic scientist who experimented with various species of animals by fusing them together. He can control these creature's DNA by special remote and has several of these creatures under and at his disposal. Recombo also experiments on himself, becoming a vicious creature with elastic limbs.

In later appearances, Recombo returns to a humanoid appearance with the long tongue and jumping abilities of a frog.

=== Doctor Eel ===
Dr. E. Elle aka Doctor Eel (voiced by Maurice LaMarche) is a scientist with a laboratory at the bottom of the ocean. He has a full bodysuit equipped with a mask and an arm cannon that can fire electricity. He uses mind control discs to make sea creatures obedient to him.

=== Bogey ===
Bogey (voiced by Thomas F. Wilson) is a highly talented hotshot pilot who has history with Hawk. As a flight school student, Bogey and Hawk pushed each other to see who was the best pilot, but Bogey's reckless actions almost got them both killed. As a result, both men were expelled after Bogey put the whole blame on Hawk for the incident during an inquest.

=== Optical ===
Optical (voiced by Jess Harnell) is a special effects specialist whose holographic imaging system can change his appearance for short periods of time. He only needs to impersonate a person's voice or actions to impersonate them. He also can copy their retinal scans if he scans their eyes with the blinding light coming out of his mechanical eye.

=== Mass ===
Vinnie "Mass" Rossi (voiced by Brian Cummings) is an extortionist who is hired by Paine to enter a wrestling battle royal to win the WWC title belt so Paine can use the belt's diamonds for his new laser. After he loses the match, Paine encases Rossi in concrete and drops him into the sea. While underwater, Rossi is exposed to radioactive waste which transforms him into a giant mass of concrete with iron pipes sticking out of his shoulders. He later gains the appearance of a lava monster.

==== Momma Rossi ====
Momma Rossi (voiced by Pat Musick) is the mother of Vinnie Rossi and the person who inspired him to be unique.

=== Bonez ===
Bonez (voiced by Pete Sepenuk) is a scientist who can transform humans into zombies with a nano-virus and his skull mask. The zombies he created can also spread the nano-virus by biting someone. With the nano-virus he has these zombies under his control. He also wields an energy scythe.

=== Team Omega ===
Team Omega is a group formed by Paine to stop the Alpha Teens for good. Tired of leaving this task to Spydah and Flesh, who almost always fail, Paine held tryouts at a rundown theater for new blood. Sadly, each audition was worse than the next. Paine decides to use contestants in the Ultimate Challenge Race, a competition the Alpha Teens were to take place in. The results were much more favorable and Paine had his team. Their objective was to permanently eliminate the Alpha Teens at the competition. After they thought they had got rid of the Alpha Teens, they helped Paine steal Nitro Alkalide and attempt to put it into an oil pipeline. They were defeated by the Alpha Teens after each member barely survived their last encounter with Team Omega. The five were arrested by police and Paine escaped.

Their members include:

- Edge (voiced by Jeff Bennett) – A punk rocker skateboarder with a cockney accent who fights with a raw and brutal style.
- Radman (voiced by Tom Kenny) – A motocross biker with beady eyes and rat-like teeth.
- Buffy (voiced by Susan Egan) – A buff woman in overalls with attitude. She's strong enough to beat Flesh in arm wrestling.
- Icarus (voiced by Jeff Bennett) – A narcissistic areal expert with a Tony Manero accent. He has a jetpack that can go at incredible speeds. Icarus also has a pair of goggles that act like binoculars, a rope he can fire from his wrists and laser beams he can fire from his gloves.
- Gator Girl – A surfer girl who has powerful shark-like teeth.

=== D-Zel ===
D-Zel (voiced by Jess Harnell) is a lowlife street biker who dated Magness when she came back to Landmark City.

=== Boon and Fender ===
Boon and Fender (voiced by Danny Mann and Maurice LaMarche respectively) were a police sergeant and court judge for Landmark City respectively. They both were being blackmailed by Paine for something that would cost them both their jobs. Boon was instructed to frame the Alpha Teens and Garrett for grand theft auto and arrest them. However, the two are thwarted and arrested.

=== Terrance Yao ===
Terrance Yao (voiced by James Sie) is a Hong Kong billionaire and tycoon for the global conglomerate Yao Federated. He secretly operates as the head of one of Hong Kong's criminal clans, including a group of ninjas.

=== Hybridon ===
Hybridon (vocal effects provided by Jeff Black) is a tiger cub that was experimented on by Recombo and transformed into a chimeric monster. It has the face and front paws of a tiger, the hood of a cobra, a snake-like appendage in its mouth, the back legs of a rhinoceros, the stomach and stinger of a European hornet, and the teeth, back fin, and tail of a shark.

In the episode "Zoo Story", Hybridon is targeted by the Mu-Team, who free it from captivity and have it placed under their control via a special chip. Though King removes the chip from Hybridon, it is soon retaken by the Mu-Team and given a serum that increases its strength and ferocity. When King is cornered by the Mu-Team, Hybridon saves him, but falls into the ocean after the cliff it is on collapses. Briefly assumed dead, Hybridon survives and swims away.

=== Colonel Steel ===
Colonel Steel is a big-game hunter who uses traps and a cloaking technology on his outfit to hunt his prey. He lures the members of A.T.O.M. to his island to act as hunting targets.

=== Racer ===
Racer is a villain who targets one of a kind vehicles. Brandon Wheeler is a media mogul who got bored with his lifestyle and decided to get his adrenaline rush as the world's greatest car thief.

=== Master Quan ===
Master Quan (voiced by Clyde Kusatsu) is the supreme master of Jo-Lan and leader of a criminal organization known as the Serpent's Tail who has been after the Power Scroll of Jo-Lan. He was responsible for training Dragon.

== Supporting characters ==
=== Garrett ===
Garrett (voiced by Alexander Polinsky) is a super genius who works for Lee Industries. He enrolled in college at a young age having two semesters with Professor Evans in a course of sonic engineering and software application. At thirteen, he received his college Ph. D and was hired by Mr. Lee that same year.

Before the Alpha Team was formed, he developed Mr. Lee's vehicles and when he was of age, road tested them as well. When a turbo ATV that he constructed and test drove broke apart, he injured two people as well as himself. The other victims recovered, but Garrett was rendered paraplegic. He now uses a technologically advanced wheelchair that can extend its height and climb on walls and ceilings.

=== Colonel Richter ===
Colonel Richter (voiced by Jess Harnell) is a special agent with Landmark City's law enforcement. He firsts crosses paths with the Alpha Teens when he believes that they have become criminals. When it is revealed that it was the shape-changing Optical along with Paine's gang who set them up, Richter dropped the charges against them. He would later help them capture Team Omega as well as a corrupt police sergeant and corrupt judge that worked for Paine.

=== Eliza ===
Eliza is Lioness's cousin; she is skilled in capoeira and is an engineering expert. The two cousins grew up together in Brazil and are close. Eliza did not think that Lioness respected her. With her assistance, Garrett and the Alpha Teens defeated Paine from destroying Landmark City. She also saved Lioness from Spydah. Lioness offered Eliza the opportunity to live with the team. She declined, wanting to set her own path in life and not following Lioness' anymore. She was given a job with Lee Industries working on projects for Mr. Lee in South America. Shark and Hawk both liked her and fought over her. She decided that she liked Garrett the most, whom she went on her first date with before she left.

=== Duke Kingston ===
Duke Kingston is King's twelve-year-old brother who is enrolled in the Landmark City School for the Gifted, of which he has the highest IQ. During King's wrestling coaching at his school with Axel, King was mothering Duke, asking him if he took his asthma medication and not letting him be a volunteer for some of King's moves. When King, Axel and Hawk left the school, Mr. Lee and the Mu-Team made their move.

Lee hooked Duke and his classmates to a machine that drained the brain power from his classmates. transferring it into Duke. Duke became smarter than fifty Albert Einsteins and has ability to use telekinetic powers fifty times more powerful than the very small latent ability each human has. This process also turned Duke and the other students evil, with Duke becoming bitter at King for embarrassing him in front of his class.

=== Sebastian Manning ===
Sebastian Manning (voiced by James Arnold Taylor) is the father of Axel Manning and a master of Jo-Lan. He also was a covert ops spy for the government, who worked closely with Alexander Paine and Janus Lee. When Axel recovered his father's diary, he found out that Lee was trading the government's project secrets for money. Sebastian went undercover and caught Lee. Lee told him the truth, saying that it was the owner of the "Serpent's Tail" a.k.a. Master Quan. Paine and Manning went into the nuclear room to fight him, however, Master Quan was equipped with a bomb. The bomb went off, and only Paine escaped alive albeit with his body scarred. Sebastian's body never appeared and he was presumed dead.

=== Michelle Moreno ===
Michelle Moreno is a news reporter for LIITV news.

=== Female Doctor ===
The Female Doctor is a doctor with brunette hair that has made a few appearances in the show. Her real name is unknown. She first appeared as Axel's dentist that shifted her attention to Hawk when he interrupted their session. She then appeared as the doctor for the ski resort on Iron Mountain who was kidnapped and replaced by Magness. She was saved by Lioness and Hawk later in that episode. Her most recent and important appearance was tending to and helping to detox Axel after Paine's men infected him with venom from a toxic water spider.
