= Martin Sturkenboom =

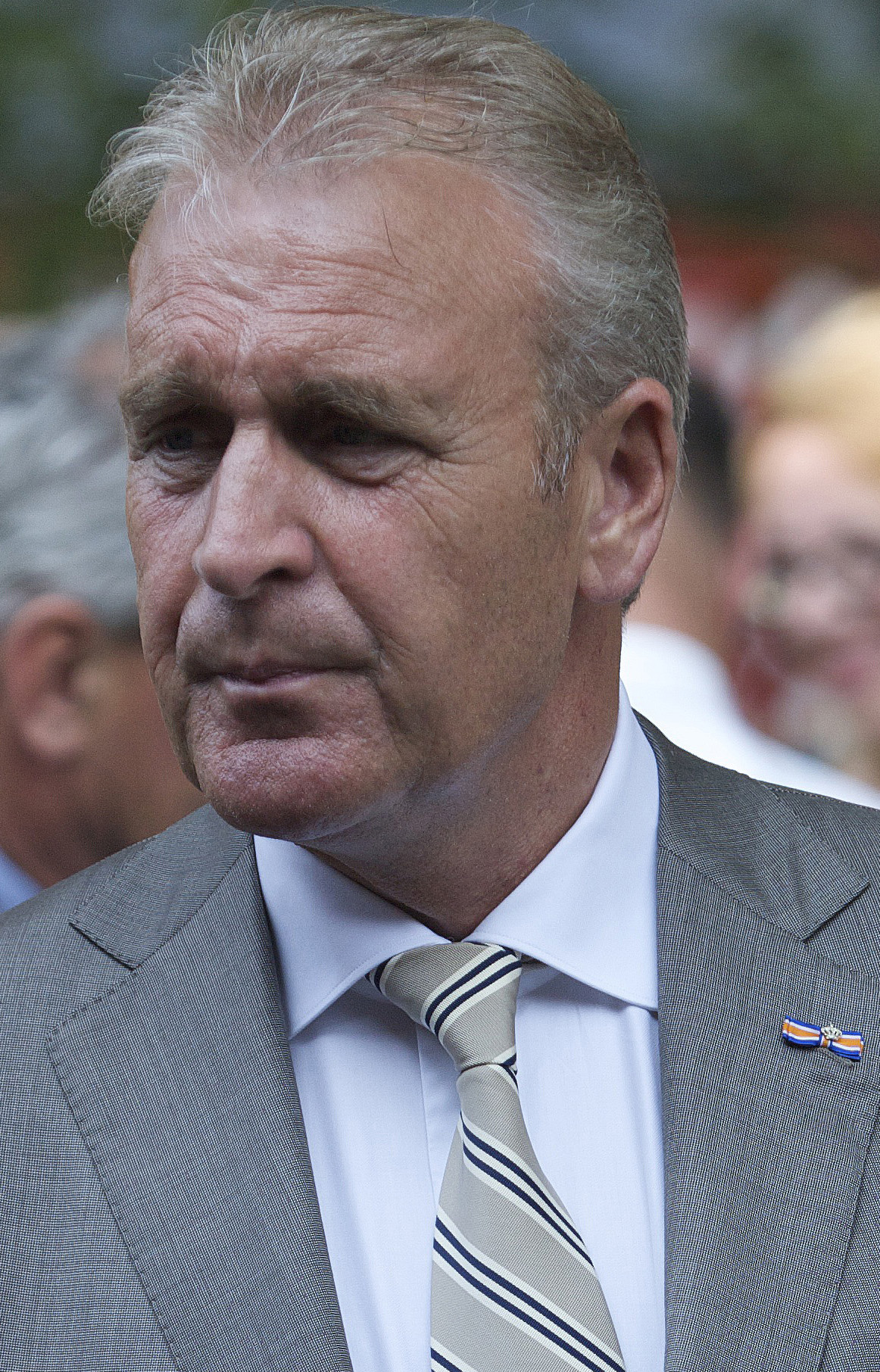
Sturkenboom in 2010

Martinus Richardus Maria "Martin" Sturkenboom (born 3 April 1953 in Utrecht) is a Dutch entrepreneur, former chairman of professional football club FC Utrecht, interim general manager of AFC Ajax and internationally active as delegate of UEFA and FIFA.

== Career ==
=== Kooijman ===
Before his appointment as manager in the premier league, Sturkenboom was active for 25 years in IT within the building services engineering industry. He owned software company Kooijman from 1989 until its sale in 2005.

=== Health Center Hoenderdaal ===
Martin Sturkenboom was also chairman of Health Center Hoenderdaal in Driebergen-Rijsenburg from 1996 to 2006. After a big fire in June 2003, Sturkenboom lead the realization of an entirely new sports center. On completion of this project he took his leave of the organization.

=== FC Utrecht ===
From 1990 to 1996, Sturkenboom was member of the board of supervisors of FC Utrecht. In October 2002, he took on the administrative and functional lead of the club, on request of the municipality of Utrecht. The club was in financial trouble at the time with a deficit of about forty million euros. Through reorganization and eventually the sale of Galgenwaard stadium, Sturkenboom was able to get the club back on track. On 1 October 2005, he handed the position of chairman to his successor Jan-Willem Dop, but remained involved as advisor until the winter break of that season. On his departure, Sturkenboom was gifted a see-through football shirt, a symbol for the open and transparent way in which he led the club.

=== FBO, Federation for Professional Football Clubs ===
In July 2005, Sturkenboom was appointed as chairman of the FBO, the employers' organization for professional football in the Netherlands.

=== KNVB, Royal Dutch Football Federation ===
In 2007, Sturkenboom was involved in the organization of the European Championship under-21, as director of operational affairs for foundation Euro 2007. On request of the board of directors of the KNVB, he was appointed as interim manager of the department of referee matters directly after the European Championship. He held this position until May 2008. From 2007 until 2011, he was also a part of the supervisory board for professional football of the KNVB.

=== AFC Ajax ===
On 16 November 2011, Sturkenboom was appointed as general manager of Ajax by the board of directors. It was the intention that trainer Louis van Gaal would take over this position afterwards and Sturkenboom would head up the operational Ajax-organisation. Ex-trainer and footballer Danny Blind was appointed as manager of technical matters, the appointment of van Gaal was however done without the knowledge of fellow commissioner Johan Cruijff. In February 2012, the appointment was annulled by the courts; Sturkenboom and Blind made the logical decision to resign from their positions.

=== UEFA ===
Since 2011, Sturkenboom is match delegate for the Union of European Football Associations (UEFA). In this position, he is responsible for overseeing the orderly organization and progression of international matches. Match delegates are also responsible for supervising compliance of the rules and regulations of UEFA concerning safety in and around the stadium during, as well as after the match. The UEFA Delegates also act at FIFA world cup qualification matches that take place in Europe, they are then referred to as ‘commissioner’.

=== Other positions ===
Alongside the above-mentioned activities as entrepreneur or interim-management, Sturkenboom also holds or has held the following executive positions:

- 2005 to 2011 supervisory board of the Contract Players Fund (CFK) of the KNVB in Gouda.
- 2005 to 2011 Chairman of the Foundation Pension Fund for Football Practitioners in the Netherlands.
- 2007 to present Board of Supervisors of the Rabobank Utrechtse Heuvelrug.
