= Cam Bogie =

Australian rules footballer, born 1915

Personal information
- Full name: Campbell Craig Bogie
- Born: 6 April 1915; Bendigo, Victoria
- Died: 19 April 2006 (aged 91)
- Height: 182 cm (6 ft 0 in)
- Weight: 79 kg (174 lb)

Playing career^{1}
Years	Club	Games (Goals)
1944–45	North Melbourne	19 (2)
- ^{1} Playing statistics correct to the end of 1945.

Campbell Craig Bogie (6 April 1915 – 19 April 2006) was an Australian rules footballer who played with North Melbourne in the Victorian Football League (VFL).
