= Bugis (disambiguation) =

The Bugis People, or the Buginese, are an ethnic group of Austronesian ancestry that inhabit parts of Southeast Asia.

Bugis may also refer to:

- Buginese language, the language of the Buginese people

== Place names ==
- Bugis, Singapore, a subzone of the Downtown Core district of Singapore
  - Bugis MRT station
- Kampong Bugis, a subzone located in the town of Kallang, Singapore
- Bugis, Samarinda Kota, the de facto seat of Samarinda local government

== Others ==
- Bugis Street (film), a 1995 film
- Kue bugis, an Indonesian desert made of soft glutinous rice

== See also ==
- Bugi (disambiguation)
