= 2014 United States FIBA Basketball World Cup team =

The United States men's national basketball team won the gold medal at the 2014 FIBA Basketball World Cup held in Spain. Prior to 2014, the event was known as the FIBA World Championship. The 24-team tournament was held from August 30 to September 14, and the victory automatically qualified the U.S. into the 2016 Olympics in Brazil. Kyrie Irving was named the Most Valuable Player (MVP) of the tournament.

The United States had automatically qualified for the World Cup by virtue of the gold medal won by their 2012 Olympic team. Despite having many newcomers, the Americans were expected to win the World Cup, and advanced to the knockout phase after starting the tournament 5–0 during the group stage. They were an undefeated 9–0 in the tournament, winning by an average margin of 33.0 points. The United States was just the third country in World Cup history to repeat as champions. Combined with their 2010 World Championship along with gold by their 2008 and 2012 Olympic teams, they also became the first country in FIBA basketball history to win four consecutive major titles.

== Roster ==
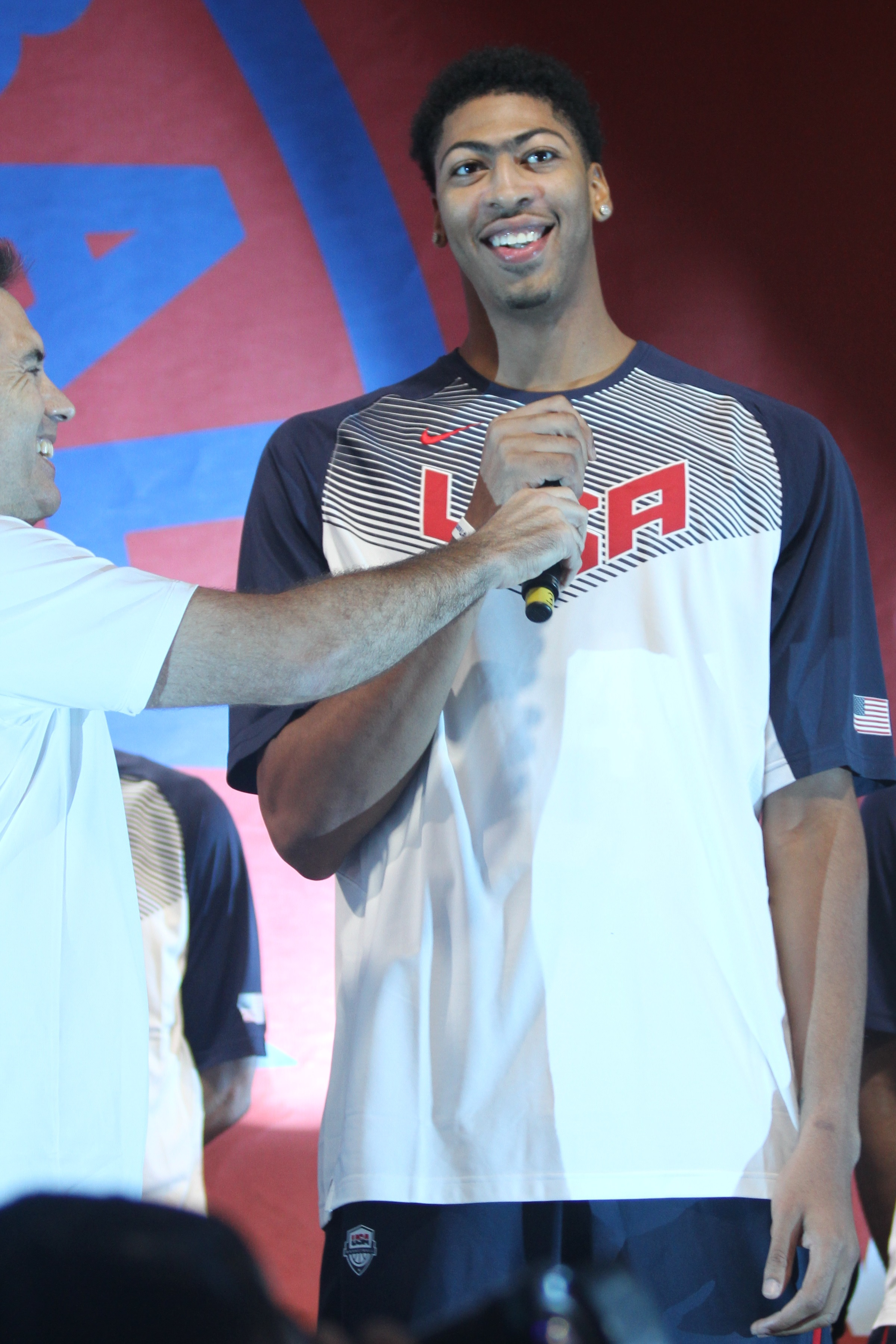
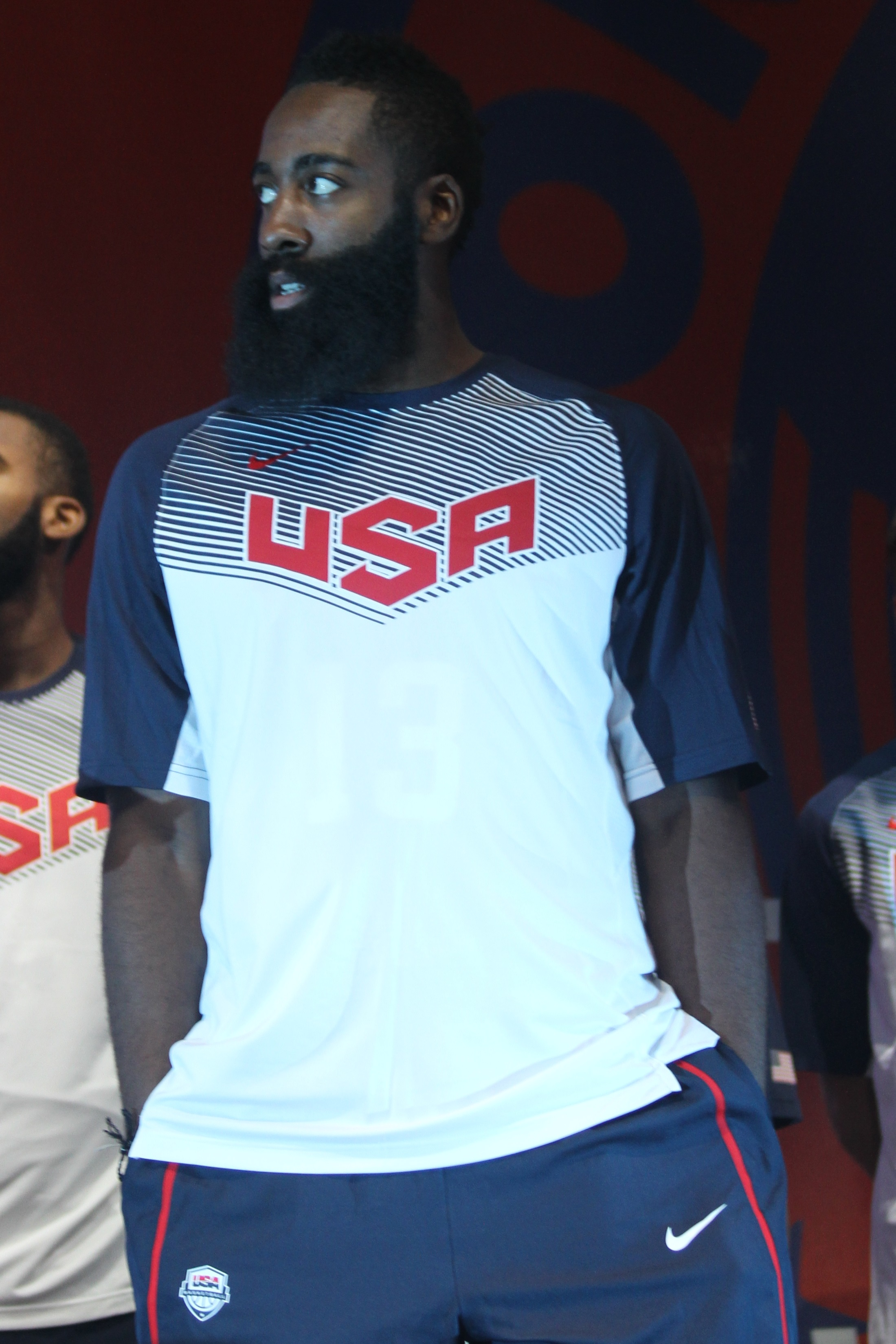
Anthony Davis (left) and James Harden (right) returned from the 2012 Olympic gold-medal team.

The squad consisted of only six former NBA All-Stars after multiple players declined to participate. Still, the team remained deep in NBA talent, and was considered the favorite to win the championship. Holdovers included 2012 Olympic gold medalists James Harden and Anthony Davis, in addition to Stephen Curry, Derrick Rose, and Rudy Gay from the 2010 championship team. The 2014 roster featured four players 6 feet 10 inches (2.08 m) or larger, the most of any US team since Mike Krzyzewski began coaching the team in 2006. The team was also the youngest American team since 1992, when NBA players were first allowed on the team; the average player was 24.08 years old, roughly a half-year younger than their 2010 team.

In January 2014, USA Basketball announced their initial 28-man list of players to be considered for their roster for the 2014 World Cup and 2016 Olympics. Players on the list who withdrew themselves from World Cup consideration were LaMarcus Aldridge, Carmelo Anthony, Tyson Chandler, Dwight Howard, Andre Iguodala, LeBron James, David Lee, Kawhi Leonard, Chris Paul, Russell Westbrook and Deron Williams.

A 19-man preliminary roster was announced on July 14, 2014. Two of the players, DeMar DeRozan and Chandler Parsons, were not named to the initial January roster. On July 25, Blake Griffin pulled out due to concerns with his back, and John Wall was named as a replacement. Mired in unresolved trade talks between his Minnesota Timberwolves and other teams, Kevin Love withdrew on July 25. Love was replaced on the training camp roster by Paul Millsap on July 27. The day before, USA Basketball chairman Jerry Colangelo said that final squad members could also potentially come from the Select Team that is scrimmaging with the main camp roster in Las Vegas. On July 29, Mason Plumlee was promoted to the senior team to give them an extra big man.

During a scrimmage on August 1, Paul George suffered a compound fracture of both bones in his lower right leg, and underwent surgery hours after the injury. George's injury was similar to one suffered by Louisville Cardinals player Kevin Ware during a 2013 NCAA tournament game against the Duke Blue Devils, coached by Krzyzewski.

The next set of cuts came on August 5, when Wall, Millsap, and Bradley Beal were cut. On August 7, Kevin Durant withdrew from the team, citing physical and mental fatigue. Coupled with George's injury, the small forward position went from being a strength to a weakness for Team USA. Shortly after Durant's withdrawal, Gay was added to the preliminary roster. Kyle Korver, Chandler Parsons, Gordon Hayward, and Damian Lillard were the final cuts on the team. Big men Davis, DeMarcus Cousins, Andre Drummond, and Plumlee—a Krzyzewski favorite whom he previously coached at Duke—were kept in anticipation of facing Spain in the title game against their frontline trio of Pau Gasol, Marc Gasol, and Serge Ibaka. Rose made the team after team officials were confident in the health of the 2010–11 NBA Most Valuable Player, despite his playing in just 10 games the prior two NBA seasons due to knee injuries.

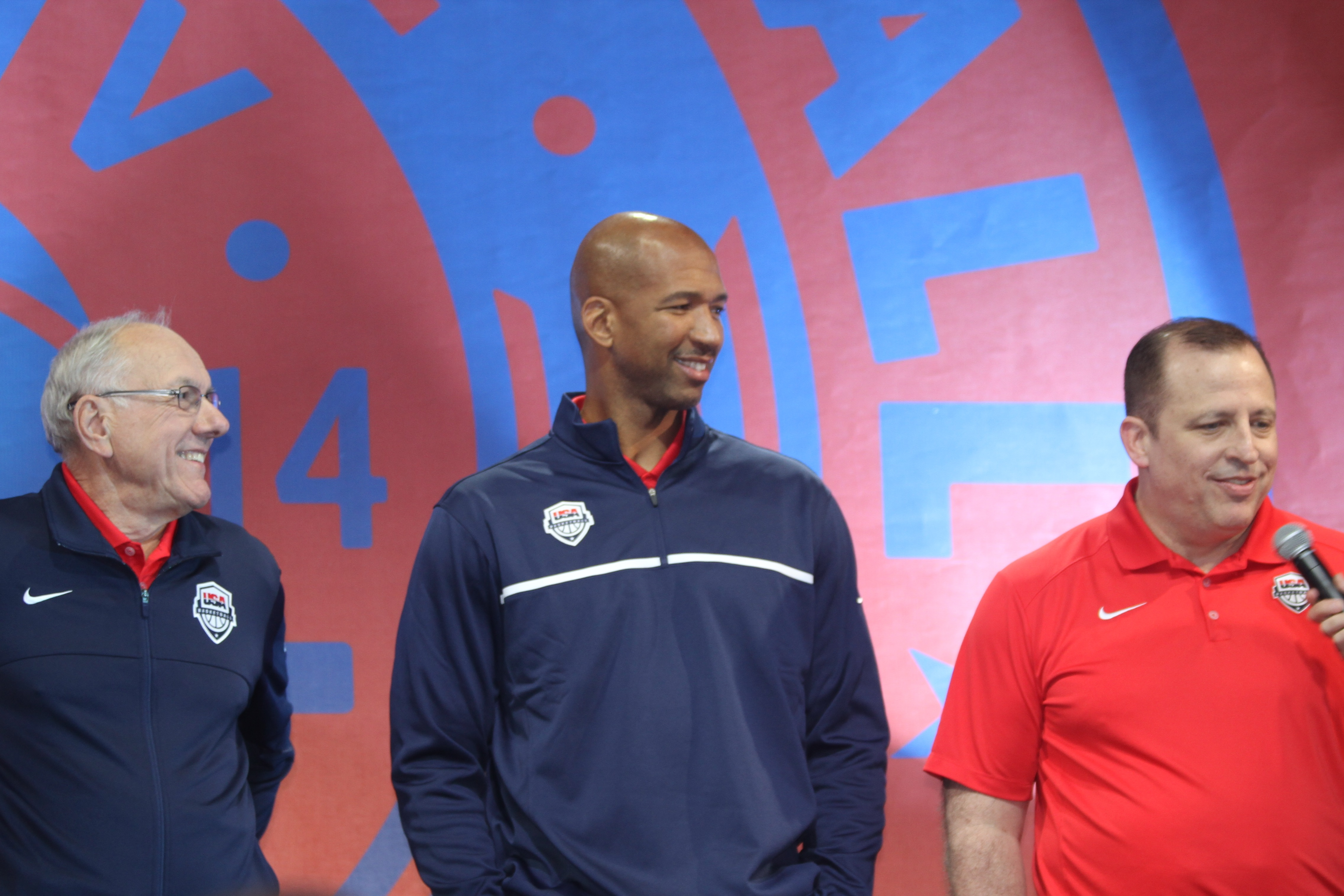
Left to right: Jim Boeheim, Monty Williams, and Tom Thibodeau served as assistant coaches.

United States men's national basketball team - 2014 FIBA Basketball World Cup roster
Players
Coaches

Pos.	No.	Name	Age – Date of birth	Height	Club
G	4	Stephen Curry	26 – 14 March 1988	1.91 m (6 ft 3 in)	Golden State Warriors	(United States)
G	5	Klay Thompson	24 – 8 February 1990	2.01 m (6 ft 7 in)	Golden State Warriors	(United States)
G	6	Derrick Rose	25 – 4 October 1988	1.91 m (6 ft 3 in)	Chicago Bulls	(United States)
F	7	Kenneth Faried	24 – 19 November 1989	2.03 m (6 ft 8 in)	Denver Nuggets	(United States)
F	8	Rudy Gay	28 – 17 August 1986	2.03 m (6 ft 8 in)	Sacramento Kings	(United States)
F	9	DeMar DeRozan	25 – 7 August 1989	2.01 m (6 ft 7 in)	Toronto Raptors	(Canada)
G	10	Kyrie Irving	22 – 23 March 1992	1.91 m (6 ft 3 in)	Cleveland Cavaliers	(United States)
C	11	Mason Plumlee	24 – 5 March 1990	2.11 m (6 ft 11 in)	Brooklyn Nets	(United States)
C	12	DeMarcus Cousins	24 – 13 August 1990	2.11 m (6 ft 11 in)	Sacramento Kings	(United States)
G	13	James Harden	25 – 26 August 1989	1.96 m (6 ft 5 in)	Houston Rockets	(United States)
F	14	Anthony Davis	21 – 11 March 1993	2.08 m (6 ft 10 in)	New Orleans Pelicans	(United States)
C	15	Andre Drummond	21 – 10 August 1993	2.08 m (6 ft 10 in)	Detroit Pistons	(United States)

Head coach

- Mike Krzyzewski

Assistant coach(es)

- Jim Boeheim
- Tom Thibodeau
- Monty Williams

Athletic Trainer

- Gregg Farnam
- Joe Sharpe

Managing director

- Jerry Colangelo

Legend

- (C) Team captain
- Club – describes last
  club before the tournament
- Age – describes age
  on 30 August 2014

== Exhibition games ==
August 16, 2014

Boxscore

Brazil	78–95	United States
Scoring by quarter: 15–29, 22–16, 26–23, 15–27
Pts: Splitter 16; Rebs: Varejão 9 Asts: Huertas 5		Pts: Davis 20; Rebs: Faried 9 Asts: Harden 5

United Center, Chicago
Attendance: 21,309
Referees: Jose Carrion, Tommy Short, Ben Taylor

August 20, 2014

Boxscore

Dominican Republic	62–105	United States
Scoring by quarter: 17–28, 14–25, 14–27, 17–25
Pts: García, Feldeine 14; Rebs: Feldeine, Baez 9 Asts: 5 players with 1		Pts: Gay, DeRozan 13; Rebs: Cousins 8 Asts: DeRozan 6

Madison Square Garden, New York City
Attendance: 16,080
Referees: Jose Carrion, Matthew Myers, Marat Kogut

August 22, 2014

Boxscore

Puerto Rico	86–112	United States
Scoring by quarter: 24–24, 23–28, 20–35, 19–25
Pts: Barea 16; Rebs: Franklin 6 Asts: Barea 3		Pts: Curry 20; Rebs: Davis, Faried, Plumlee 5 Asts: Irving 6

Madison Square Garden, New York City
Attendance: 16,498
Referees: Jose Carrion, Matthew Myers, Marat Kogut

August 26, 2014

Boxscore

Slovenia	71–101	United States
Scoring by quarter: 18–24, 17–24, 19–33, 17–20
Pts: Dragić 16; Rebs: Omić 9 Asts: Zupan, Klobučar 2		Pts: Davis 18; Rebs: Davis 9 Asts: Harden 4

Gran Canaria Arena, Las Palmas, Spain
Attendance: 10,200
Referees: Hierrezuela, García, Araña

== Preliminary round ==
Team USA entered the opening round with a 54-game winning steak, including exhibition games. They completed group play 5–0, averaging 102.2 points with an average victory margin of 33.2. They competed in Group C with the Dominican Republic, Turkey, Finland, New Zealand and Ukraine. Each team played the other respective teams from the group once, for a total of five games per team, with all the games being played at Bizkaia Arena in Barakaldo (at Greater Bilbao). After all the games were played, the four teams with the best records from each group qualified for the final round.

The U.S. had few problems advancing to the knockout round, though they habitually started games slowly, and their guards had yet to meet expectations to consistently excel on offense. The team was most dangerous when playing in transition, while they struggled at times in their half-court offense.

Qualified for the final round
Eliminated

Pos	Team	Pld	W	L	PF	PA	PD	Pts	Qualification
1	United States	5	5	0	511	345	+166	10	Round of 16
2	Turkey	5	3	2	365	372	−7	8	Round of 16
3	Dominican Republic	5	2	3	347	386	−39	7 (Note: Head-to-head record: Dominican Republic 1–1 (1.022 GAvg), New Zealand 1–1 (0.993 GAvg), Ukraine 1–1 (0.985 GAvg),)	Round of 16
4	New Zealand	5	2	3	347	376	−29	7	Round of 16
5	Ukraine	5	2	3	344	369	−25	7	
6	Finland	5	1	4	342	408	−66	6	

Source: FIBA archive
Rules for classification: 1) points; 2) head-to-head points; 3) head-to-head goal average; 4) head-to-head number of points scored.
Notes:

All times are local to Spain, UTC+2.

=== Finland ===
August 30, 2014
21:30

Boxscore

United States	114–55	Finland
Scoring by quarter: 31–16, 29–2, 29–21, 25–16
Pts: Thompson 18; Rebs: Cousins 10; Asts: Curry 5		Pts: Huff, Koponen 12; Rebs: Murphy 7 Asts: Koponen 4

Bizkaia Arena, Barakaldo
Attendance: 11,300
Referees: Miguel Pérez (ESP), Arnaud Kom Njilo (CMR), Alejandro Sánchez (URU)

The Americans held Finland without a field goal in the second quarter, outscoring them 29–2 in the period en route to a 114–55 blowout victory. Klay Thompson scored 18 points and Davis added 17 to lead the U.S. The Americans quieted the vocal Finnish fans, who filled an entire side of the arena, by holding their opponents to 0-for-17 shooting in the second quarter. They forced 17 first-half turnovers to build a 60–18 lead by halftime.

Team USA shot 59 percent from the field as every American scored. Rose added 12 points playing a team-high 23 minutes, and Gay had 10 against Finland, who were ranked 39th, the lowest ranked team to ever receive a wild card from FIBA. The Finns finished the game with 31 turnovers and only five assists.

=== Turkey ===
August 31, 2014
21:30

Boxscore

Turkey	77–98	United States
Scoring by quarter: 16–16, 24–19, 20–31, 17–32
Pts: Akyol 12; Rebs: Aşık 8 Asts: Preldžić 5		Pts: Faried 22; Rebs: Faried 8 Asts: Harden 7

Bizkaia Arena, Barakaldo
Attendance: 14,637
Referees: Alejandro Chiti (ARG), Joseph Bissang (FRA), Alejandro Sánchez (URU)

In a rematch of the 2010 gold-medal game, the U.S. was behind 40–35 at the half and Turkey led by six early in the third quarter before the Americans pulled away for a 98–77 win. Despite the final margin, the U.S. did not manage a double-digit lead until 8:57 remaining in game. The Turks effectively slowed the pace of the game for much of the first three quarters before Team USA used a 17–1 run to pull away. Kenneth Faried led the U.S. with 22 points and eight rebounds.

The game was unexpectedly tough after Team USA's 59-point rout against Finland and Turkey's needing to rally to win 76–73 against New Zealand. The Americans and Turks were tied at 16 after one quarter, and the U.S. showed frustration in the second period over the pace of the game and calls that went against them. The U.S. could not get into their transition game, unable to force turnovers or missed shots from Turkey. Davis had been the best player during the summer, but he was scoreless and had only one rebound in the first half as he was limited to 10 1/2 minutes while committing two fouls. The Turks held a 21–12 rebounding edge at the half, and had shot 18 free throws to the Americans 5. The game was tied at 59 with 3:10 remaining in the third when the Americans went on a 7–1 run to lead 66–60 after a basket by Faried. They opened the fourth quarter with 10 unanswered points to pull ahead 76–60.

Davis scored all of his 19 points in the second half, and finished with six rebounds. Harden added 14 points, and Kyrie Irving scored 13 while playing extended minutes with a struggling Rose on the bench until Team USA was safely ahead in the fourth quarter. Without Ersan İlyasova and Enes Kanter on their team and Hedo Türkoğlu retired from international play, Ömer Aşık was the only NBA player on Turkey's roster; they did return eight players from their 2010 team. "I guess we felt like last night's game was pretty easy and tonight was going to be the same way", Harden said. Added Krzyzewski: "The big lesson for our team is you can’t take things for granted, especially when you’re playing teams the caliber of Turkey".

=== New Zealand ===
September 2, 2014
17:30

Boxscore

United States	98–71	New Zealand
Scoring by quarter: 27–20, 30–15, 18–19, 23–17
Pts: Davis 21; Rebs: Faried 11; Asts: Harden 4		Pts: Anthony 11; Rebs: Vukona, Abercrombie 5 Asts: Tait 3

Bizkaia Arena, Barakaldo
Attendance: 14,399
Referees: Milivoje Jovčić (SRB), Matej Boltauzer (SLO), Ferdinand Pascual (PHI)

Team USA led the game from beginning to end and won 98–71 over New Zealand. The game was close for a little more than a quarter before the Americans overpowered the Kiwis with their inside game. The U.S. was led by Davis' 21 points and nine rebounds, and Faried scored 15 and had 11 boards—including seven on the offensive end.

The score was 27–20 after the first quarter, and the Americans were leading by nine when they went on a 12–0 run behind seven points by Irving. The streak featured Team USA's transition game, but they frequently took advantage of Davis' and Faried's inside game in the first half. Rose started the second half in place of Irving, as Krzyzewski wanted the former NBA MVP to receive more playing time with starters. He played the first 6:17 of the third and started the fourth as well. Harden scored 13, and Curry finished the game with 12 points after struggling with just 4-for-17 shooting in the opening two games. Thompson also scored 12, while Irving added 10, as Team USA had six players in double figures.

Faried, who entered the game shooting 14-of-17, made 7-for-9 in the game for an overall 80.8 percent in the series. "Overall, from the start of training camp, he's been the biggest and best surprise and has turned out to be a very, very important player for us", Krzyzewski said. "He’s made that happen. We never call a play for him".

=== Dominican Republic ===
September 3, 2014
21:30

Boxscore

Dominican Republic	71–106	United States
Scoring by quarter: 22–25, 19–31, 11–25, 19–25
Pts: Liz 15; Rebs: Feldeine 8 Asts: Feldeine, Sosa 4		Pts: Faried 16; Rebs: Davis 8 Asts: Curry 7

Bizkaia Arena, Barakaldo
Attendance: 14,104
Referees: Joseph Bissang (FRA), Alejandro Chiti (ARG), Alejandro Sánchez (URU)

The Americans cruised to 106–71 victory over the Dominican Republic after a sluggish first quarter. A 25–22 first-quarter lead grew to 15 by the half, and the U.S. led 92–52 after a 22–0 second-half run. Faried led the team with 16 points and added six rebounds, and Cousins also scored 13.

The Dominican Republic was playing without injured Francisco Garcia, who was averaging a team-high 21 points per game, but remained close after Team USA missed five free throws in the first period. The U.S. led by seven in the second quarter when Faried scored three consecutive baskets and Davis hit a jumper to build a comfortable 44–29 lead. The Americans scored 25 points in the third and another 25 in the fourth, including a series of dunks by end-of-the-bench players Drummond and Plumlee. The team exceeded triple digits for the second time after scoring 98 in each of the previous two wins.

=== Ukraine ===
September 4, 2014
17:30

Boxscore

Ukraine	71–95	United States
Scoring by quarter: 19–14, 13–30, 22–25, 17–26
Pts: Kravtsov 15; Rebs: Korniyenko 6 Asts: Mishula 4		Pts: Harden 17; Rebs: Faried 8 Asts: Irving 6

Bizkaia Arena, Barakaldo
Attendance: 15,483
Referees: Matej Boltauzer (SLO), Arnaud Kom Njilo (CMR), Ferdinand Pascual (PHI)

Ukraine slowed the pace of the game for most of the first half before Team USA overcame another poor start for a 95–71 win. Harden had his best game during group play with a team-high 17 points. The only major scare for the U.S. occurred near the end of the game when Irving fell hard.

The Ukrainians slowed the pace of the game for the first quarter and a half, and led 19–14 after the first period. They remained ahead 27–25 midway through the second until Curry made a pair of three-point field goals during a 19–5 spurt in the last 4:43 that gave the U.S. a 44–32 lead at the half. The Americans led 69–54 after three, and were never in danger of losing in the second half. Irving left the game with 1:12 remaining after slipping and falling hard on his tailbone; he walked off holding his lower back. He said he was "fine" after the game, and the team stated it did not "anticipate a serious injury".

Curry scored 14, one of six Americans in double figures. Ukraine was coached by former NBA coach Mike Fratello, and they were led by 7-foot (2.1 m) NBA player Viacheslav Kravtsov's team-high 15 points.

== Final round ==
Round of 16
6 September – Madrid
Spain	89
Senegal	56
6 September – Madrid
Croatia	64
France	69
7 September – Madrid
Greece	72
Serbia	90
7 September – Madrid
Brazil	85
Argentina	65
6 September – Barcelona
United States	86
Mexico	63
6 September – Barcelona
Slovenia	71
Dominican Republic	61
7 September – Barcelona
Lithuania	76
New Zealand	71
7 September – Barcelona
Turkey	65
Australia	64

Quarter-finals
10 September – Madrid
Spain	52
France	65
10 September – Madrid
Serbia	84
Brazil	56
9 September – Barcelona
United States	119
Slovenia	76
9 September – Barcelona
Lithuania	73
Turkey	61

Semi-finals
12 September – Madrid
France	85
Serbia	90
11 September – Barcelona
United States	96
Lithuania	68

Final
14 September – Madrid
Serbia	92
United States	129
Third place
13 September – Madrid
France	95
Lithuania	93

The U.S. advanced to the knockout stage in which the top four teams from the respective preliminary round groups qualified in the single-elimination tournament. The losers in the semifinals will play for the bronze medal. Teams from Groups A and B will play at the Palacio de Deportes de la Comunidad de Madrid in Madrid, while those from Groups C and D play at the Palau Sant Jordi in Barcelona. The third place game and the final will be held at the Madrid arena.

=== Round of 16 – Mexico ===
September 6, 2014
16:00

Boxscore

United States	86–63	Mexico
Scoring by quarter: 23–13, 19–14, 24–11, 20–25
Pts: Curry 20; Rebs: Faried 8 Asts: Curry, Rose 4		Pts: Ayón 25; Rebs: Ayón 8 Asts: Gutiérrez 3

Palau Sant Jordi, Barcelona
Attendance: 14,200
Referees: Eddie Viator (FRA), Carlos Julio (ANG), Oļegs Latiševs (LAT)

The U.S. avoided another slow start and Curry scored 20 while making six three-pointers in an 86–63 win over Mexico. Curry was 7-of-10 from the field and 6-for-9 from outside. Thompson, Curry's teammate on the Golden State Warriors, added 15 points, and the Americans made 13 three-pointers.

Team USA jumped out to an early 13–2 lead before Mexico scored seven unanswered points. The Americans stretched the lead to 23–13 after one quarter, and the lead remained in double digits for most of the second period for a 42–27 halftime lead. Curry then made back-to-back threes to make it 50–27. Davis and Faried, Team USA's dominant players in the first round, scored four and eight points, respectively. Instead, the team's top three scorers were its perimeter players; Harden added 12 points.

Cousins, who Krzyzewski commended for another strong outing, made all five of his shots for 11 points and added seven rebounds. Mexico's 6-foot-9-inch (2.06 m) Gustavo Ayón, who played in the NBA in 2013–14, finished with 25 points.

=== Quarterfinals – Slovenia ===
September 9, 2014
21:00

Boxscore

Slovenia	76–119	United States
Scoring by quarter: 22–29, 20–20, 22–37, 12–33
Pts: G. Dragić 13; Rebs: Balažič, Lorbek 6 Asts: G. Dragić 4		Pts: Thompson 20; Rebs: Davis 11; Asts: Rose 5

Palau Sant Jordi, Barcelona
Attendance: 13,674
Referees: Cristiano Maranho (BRA), Robert Lottermoser (GER), Ferdinand Pascual (PHI)

Team USA won 119–76 after a troubled first half against a Slovenia team they comfortably handled in an exhibition game two weeks earlier. The Americans were led by Thompson's 20 points, and Harden scored 12 of his 14 in the third period.

The U.S. missed 10 of their first 11 shots and misfired on 21 overall in the first quarter, but their 14 offensive rebounds led to 15 second-chance points for a 29–22 lead after one. Slovenia made 70 percent of its two-pointers in the first half, but the Americans still led 49–42 despite shooting just 36 percent overall in the first two quarters; Harden and Curry were a combined 0-for-12. Team USA led by just five early in the third before going on a 27–10 run, as Slovenian turnovers led to American dunks. The U.S. scored the first 10 points in the fourth for a 96–64 lead.

Faried had 14 points with 10 rebounds, and Davis added 13 and 11. The U.S. finished with 23 offensive rebounds and 53 overall, which Slovenia coach Jure Zdovc called the difference in the game. Rose added 12 points on 6-for-12 shooting after going just 8-for-37 in the first six games of the World Cup. Slovenia was led by Goran Dragić's 12 points. He combined with brother Zoran Dragić for 24 points on 27 shots and nine rebounds.

=== Semifinals – Lithuania ===
11 September 2014
21:00

Boxscore

United States	96–68	Lithuania
Scoring by quarter: 21–16, 22–19, 33–14, 20–19
Pts: Irving 18; Rebs: Gay 7 Asts: Irving 4		Pts: Valančiūnas, Kuzminskas 15; Rebs: Kuzminskas 9 Asts: Juškevičius, Seibutis 2

Palau Sant Jordi, Barcelona
Attendance: 15,070
Referees: José Reyes (MEX), Matej Boltauzer (SLO), Sreten Radović (CRO)

Harden scored all 16 of his points in the third quarter, when the United States outscored Lithuania 33–14 for a 96–68 victory. After a tight first half, the U.S. started forcing turnovers to trigger its fast break, opening up the game. Irving scored 18 points and Thompson had 16 off the bench.

The first half was dominated by fouls on both sides, and the Americans led at the half 43–35. Late in the half, Cousins was elbowed in the throat by Lithuanian center Jonas Valančiūnas while boxing out for a rebound. Cousins then charged at him without throwing a punch, and received a technical foul. For the second straight game, Harden was scoreless in the first half. He scored the first field goal of the second half, and finished a 10–0 U.S. run with a three pointer that put the team ahead 53–35 in under two minutes. An 18–2 run to start the half was capped by a lob from Irving to Davis for the basket. Team USA made 14 of 19 shots in the quarter to build a 76–49 lead to start the fourth.

Curry received his fourth foul two minutes into the second half, and Davis fouled out early in the fourth quarter after receiving a technical for his fifth foul. Valančiūnas and Mindaugas Kuzminskas both scored 15 points for Lithuania. Entering the contest, Kuzminskas averaged 2.4 points in five games in the tournament for Lithuania while averaging a team-low 9.0 minutes.

=== Final – Serbia ===
September 14, 2014
21:00

Boxscore

United States	129–92	Serbia
Scoring by quarter: 35–21, 32–20, 38–26, 24–25
Pts: Irving 26; Rebs: Cousins 9 Asts: Rose 6		Pts: Bjelica, Kalinić 18; Rebs: Marković 6 Asts: Teodosić 7

Palacio de Deportes de la Comunidad de Madrid, Madrid
Attendance: 13,673
Referees: Stephen Seibel (CAN), Borys Ryzhyk (UKR), Eddie Viator (FRA)

Serbia made their first five shots of the game to jump to a 10–5 lead. After a U.S. timeout, Serbia scored anew, then the Americans had a 17–3 run to go up by seven. Irving and Thompson scored three-pointers to give the U.S. a 35–21 lead. In the second quarter, the Americans made six more three point shots to give them a 26-point lead at the half. Team USA held its largest lead of 39 points by the middle of the third quarter. The final deficit of 37 points and the 129 overall points scored were the largest in a World Cup final since Team USA's 137–91 victory over Russia in the 1994 FIBA World Championship. The Americans also became the third team, along with Brazil and Yugoslavia, to successfully defend the world title, and tied the Yugoslavs with having the most championships, with five.

The Americans shot 58% from the field and 50% from beyond the three-point line in the game, won all nine games by an average of 33.0 points, and qualified to the 2016 Olympics. Irving was named the tournament MVP. He and Faried were both named to the All-Tournament Team.

== Statistics ==
Legend
GP	Games played	GS	Games started	MPG	Minutes per game
FGM	Field goals made	FGA	Field goals attempted	FG%	Field goal percentage
3PM	3-point field goals made	3PA	3-point field goals attempted	3P%	3-point field goal percentage
FTM	Free throws made	FTA	Free throws attempted	FT%	Free throw percentage
RPG	Rebounds per game	APG	Assists per game	PPG	Points per game

Player	GP	GS	MPG	FGM	FGA	FG%	3PM	3PA	3P%	FTM	FTA	FT%	RPG	APG	PPG
James Harden	9	9	22.0	41	78	.526	12	29	.414	34	42	.810	2.8	3.2	14.2
Klay Thompson	9	0	23.4	45	86	.523	22	53	.415	2	4	.500	2.2	2.1	12.7
Anthony Davis	9	9	19.7	45	82	.549	0	0	—	21	28	.750	6.6	0.8	12.3
Kenneth Faried	9	9	21.4	50	79	.633	0	1	.000	10	15	.667	7.7	0.7	12.2
Kyrie Irving	9	9	24.3	45	80	.562	14	23	.609	5	6	.833	2.6	3.6	12.1
Stephen Curry	9	9	20.7	29	71	.408	21	48	.438	17	17	1.000	2.8	2.9	10.7
DeMarcus Cousins	9	0	13.9	34	48	.708	0	0	—	20	30	.667	5.7	1.0	9.8
Rudy Gay	9	0	14.0	22	46	.478	5	12	.417	5	9	.556	3.7	1.4	6.0
Derrick Rose	9	0	17.1	15	59	.254	1	19	.053	12	15	.800	1.9	3.1	4.8
DeMar DeRozan	9	0	11.8	15	28	.536	2	7	.286	11	15	.733	1.0	1.2	4.8
Andre Drummond	8	0	5.8	11	18	.611	0	0	—	2	7	.286	2.5	0.1	3.0
Mason Plumlee	9	0	6.7	9	15	.600	0	0	—	3	11	.273	2.0	0.3	2.0
Total	9	9	200.0	361	690	.523	77	192	.401	142	199	.714	44.8	20.4	104.6
Opponents	9	9	200.0	236	596	.396	56	200	.280	116	166	.699	35.8	12.1	71.6
