= Jean Bougie =

Canadian ice hockey player

- Born: January 11, 1886; Valleyfield, Quebec, Canada
- Died: October 19, 1918 (aged 32)
- Height: 5 ft 5 in (165 cm)
- Weight: 145 lb (66 kg; 10 st 5 lb)
- Position: Centre
- Shot: Left
- Played for: Montreal Canadiens
- Playing career: 1905–1914

Joseph Jean "Tizon" Bougie (January 11, 1886 – October 19, 1918) was a Canadian professional ice hockey and baseball player. He played one game with the Montreal Canadiens of the National Hockey Association in February 1912.

He played baseball in the Montreal City League with Montreal Voltigeurs in 1912 and with Valleyfield. At his death from Spanish flu in October 1918, he was described as one of the most effective and popular players with the Lachine team of the Ligue Nationale Independante de Baseball. He was an outfielder and outstanding hitter.
