= DeMarcus Cousins =

American basketball player (born 1990)

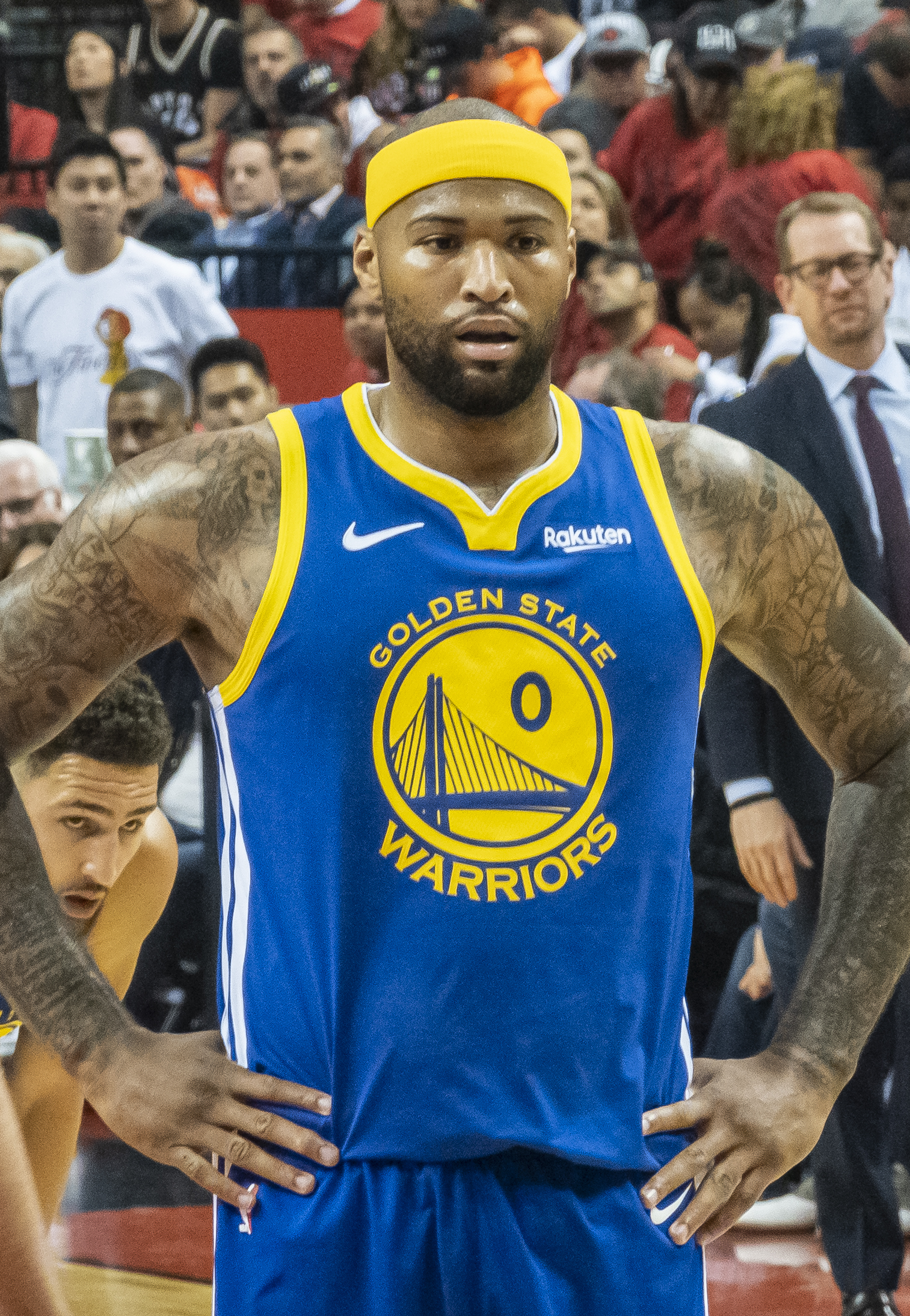
- Cousins with the Golden State Warriors in 2019

No. 15 – Selenge Bodons
- Position: Center
- League: Mongolian Basketball League

Personal information
- Born: August 13, 1990 (age 36) Mobile, Alabama, U.S.
- Listed height: 6 ft 10 in (2.08 m)
- Listed weight: 270 lb (122 kg)

Career information
- High school: LeFlore (Mobile, Alabama)
- College: Kentucky (2009–2010)
- NBA draft: 2010: 1st round, 5th overall pick
- Drafted by: Sacramento Kings
- Playing career: 2010–present

Career history
- 2010–2017: Sacramento Kings
- 2017–2018: New Orleans Pelicans
- 2018–2019: Golden State Warriors
- 2020–2021: Houston Rockets
- 2021: Los Angeles Clippers
- 2021–2022: Milwaukee Bucks
- 2022: Denver Nuggets
- 2023: Mets de Guaynabo
- 2023–2024: Taiwan Beer Leopards
- 2025: Selenge Bodons
- 2025: Mets de Guaynabo
- 2026–present: Selenge Bodons

Career highlights
- 4× NBA All-Star (2015–2018); 2× All-NBA Second Team (2015, 2016); NBA All-Rookie First Team (2011); T1 League champion (2024); T1 League Finals MVP (2024); T1 League Most Popular Player of the Year (2024); Consensus second-team All-American (2010); First-team All-SEC (2010); SEC Rookie of the Year (2010); SEC All-Rookie Team (2010); McDonald's All-American (2009); First-team Parade All-American (2009)
- Stats at NBA.com
- Stats at Basketball Reference
Medals
Men's basketball
Representing the United States
Olympic Games
Gold medal – first place	2016 Rio de Janeiro	Team
World Cup
Gold medal – first place	2014 Spain	Team

DeMarcus Amir Cousins (born August 13, 1990) is an American professional basketball player for the Selenge Bodons of the Mongolian Basketball League. Nicknamed "Boogie", he played college basketball for the Kentucky Wildcats, earning consensus second-team All-American honors in 2010. He left Kentucky after his freshman season, and was selected with the fifth overall pick in the 2010 NBA draft by the Sacramento Kings. In his first season with the Kings, Cousins was named to the NBA All-Rookie First Team, and from 2015 to 2018, he was named an NBA All-Star four times. He is also a two-time gold medal winner as a member of the United States national team, winning his first in 2014 at the FIBA Basketball World Cup and his second in 2016 at the Rio Olympics.

== High school career ==
Cousins attended LeFlore Magnet High School in Mobile, Alabama. He was a first-team Parade All-American in 2009 and played in the 2009 McDonald's All-American Boys Game, finishing with 14 points and 8 rebounds. Cousins also played in the 2009 Nike Hoop Summit at the Rose Garden in Portland and the Jordan Brand Classic at Madison Square Garden where he scored 10 points for the black team. He led LeFlore to the Alabama class 6A Final Four, falling short in the semifinal game to future college teammate Eric Bledsoe and Parker High School.

College recruiting
Name	Hometown	School	Height	Weight	Commit date
DeMarcus Cousins; PF / C	Mobile, Alabama	LeFlore	6 ft 9 in (2.06 m)	250 lb (110 kg)	Apr 9, 2009
DeMarcus Cousins; PF / C	Recruit ratings: Scout: Rivals: 247Sports: (98)				
Overall recruit ranking: Scout: 2 (C); 3 (national); 1 (school) Rivals: 1 (PF); 2 (national) ESPN: 1 (C)
Note: In many cases, Scout, Rivals, 247Sports, On3, and ESPN may conflict in their listings of height and weight.; In these cases, the average was taken. ESPN grades are on a 100-point scale.; Sources: "2009 Kentucky Basketball Commitment List". Rivals.; "2009 Kentucky College Basketball Team Recruiting Prospects". Scout.; "Kentucky Wildcats 2009 Player Commits". ESPN.; "Scout.com Team Recruiting Rankings". Scout.; "2009 Team Ranking". Rivals.

== College career ==
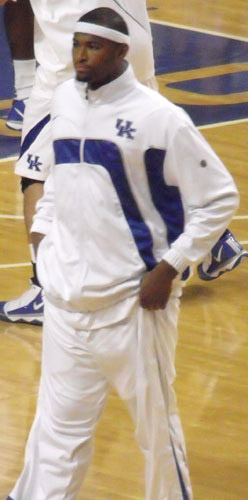
Cousins with Kentucky in 2009

Cousins first committed to Alabama-Birmingham on February 28, 2008, but never signed a letter of intent. Cousins decommitted from UAB and committed to Memphis on March 9, 2009. He reopened his recruitment after then Memphis coach John Calipari was hired at Kentucky. On April 7, 2009, Cousins decided to follow John Calipari to Kentucky. He signed his letter of intent on April 15. At Kentucky, Cousins averaged 15.1 points, 9.8 rebounds and 1.8 blocks per game. Led by Cousins and John Wall, the Wildcats reached the Elite Eight of the 2010 NCAA Tournament.

== Professional career ==
=== Sacramento Kings (2010–2017) ===
==== 2010–14: All-Rookie honors and controversies ====
On April 7, 2010, Cousins announced that he would forgo his final three seasons of collegiate eligibility and enter the 2010 NBA draft, where he was selected by the Sacramento Kings with the fifth overall pick. On July 7, 2010, Cousins signed his rookie contract with the Kings, worth about $7 million for the first two years with a team option for the third and fourth years. Cousins was named the Rookie of the Month for July during the NBA Summer League. Cousins was also named to the NBA All-Rookie First Team at the end of the 2010–11 season.

On January 1, 2012, head coach Paul Westphal sent Cousins home from the Kings' home game against the New Orleans Hornets, saying that Cousins was "unwilling/unable to embrace traveling in the same direction as his team; it cannot be ignored indefinitely." Cousins, who had been averaging 13.0 points and 11.3 rebounds per game at the time of the dismissal, reportedly demanded to be traded from the Kings. Cousins later denied asking to be traded.

On January 5, 2012, Westphal was fired from the Kings, leading many to speculate that the head coach's tumultuous relationship with Cousins was a factor in his being replaced. On February 8, 2012, Cousins was selected to play in the Rising Stars Challenge. He played for Team Chuck, with a mix of rookies and sophomores.

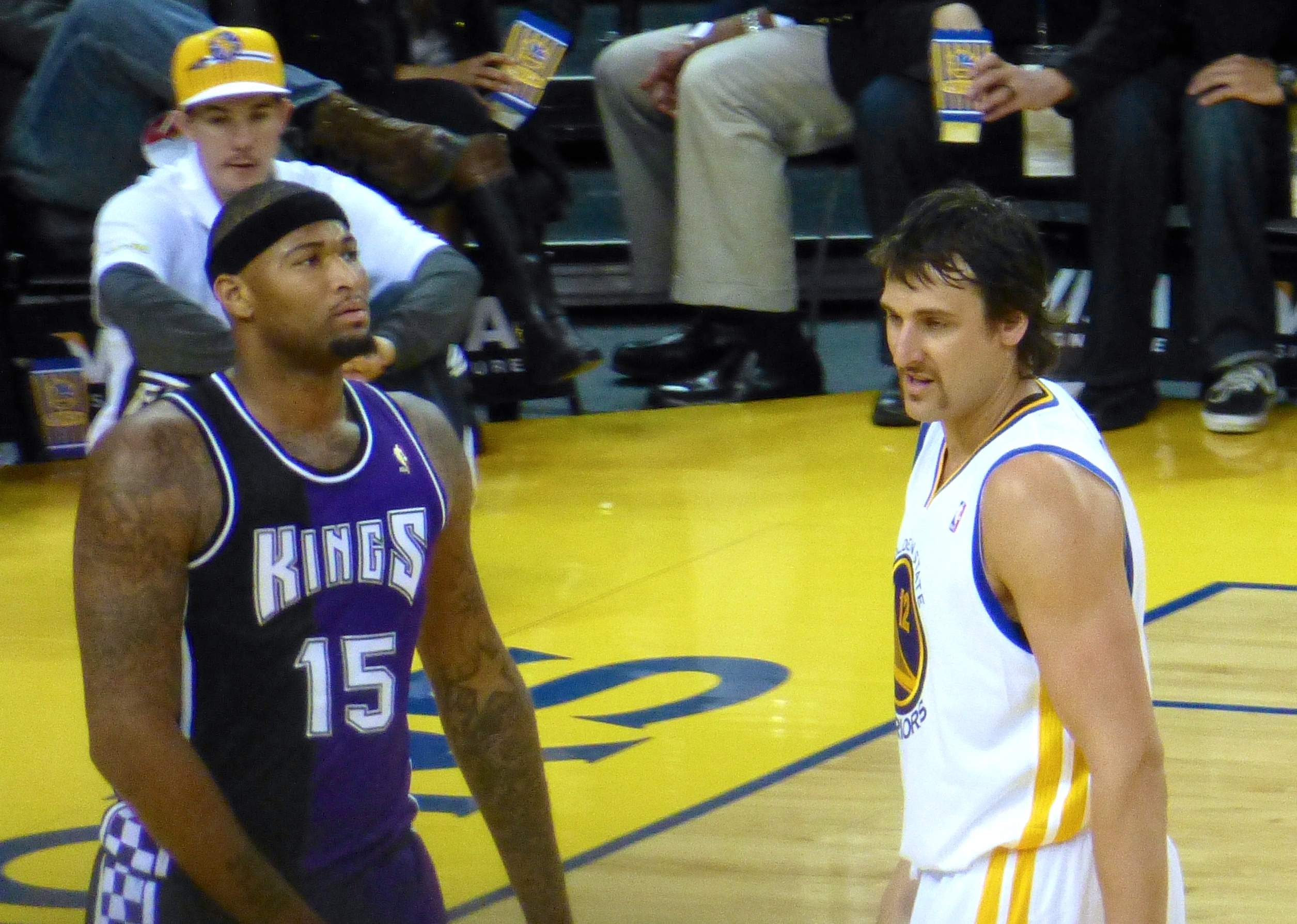
Cousins with Andrew Bogut

On November 11, 2012, the league suspended Cousins for two games without pay for confronting San Antonio Spurs color commentator Sean Elliott "in a hostile manner" after he criticized Cousins for attempting to bully Tim Duncan on the court. Cousins was apparently informed of Elliott's remarks after the game. He left the locker room and waited on the court for Elliott to finish his post-game show before confronting him. Some criticized the suspension as overly harsh and based more on Cousins' reputation than what actually happened, while others said he needed to grow up and learn a lesson about confronting the media. Cousins apologized to Elliott in person before a game against the Spurs in March 2014, which Elliott said he appreciated.

On December 22, 2012, Cousins was suspended indefinitely from the Kings, who accused him of "unprofessional behavior and conduct detrimental to the team". The suspension was lifted on December 24, 2012. The season was up-and-down for Cousins, who posted career-highs in Player Efficiency Rating, field goal percentage, and free throw percentage, but led the NBA with 16 technical fouls, was ejected several times and suspended by both the league and the Kings.

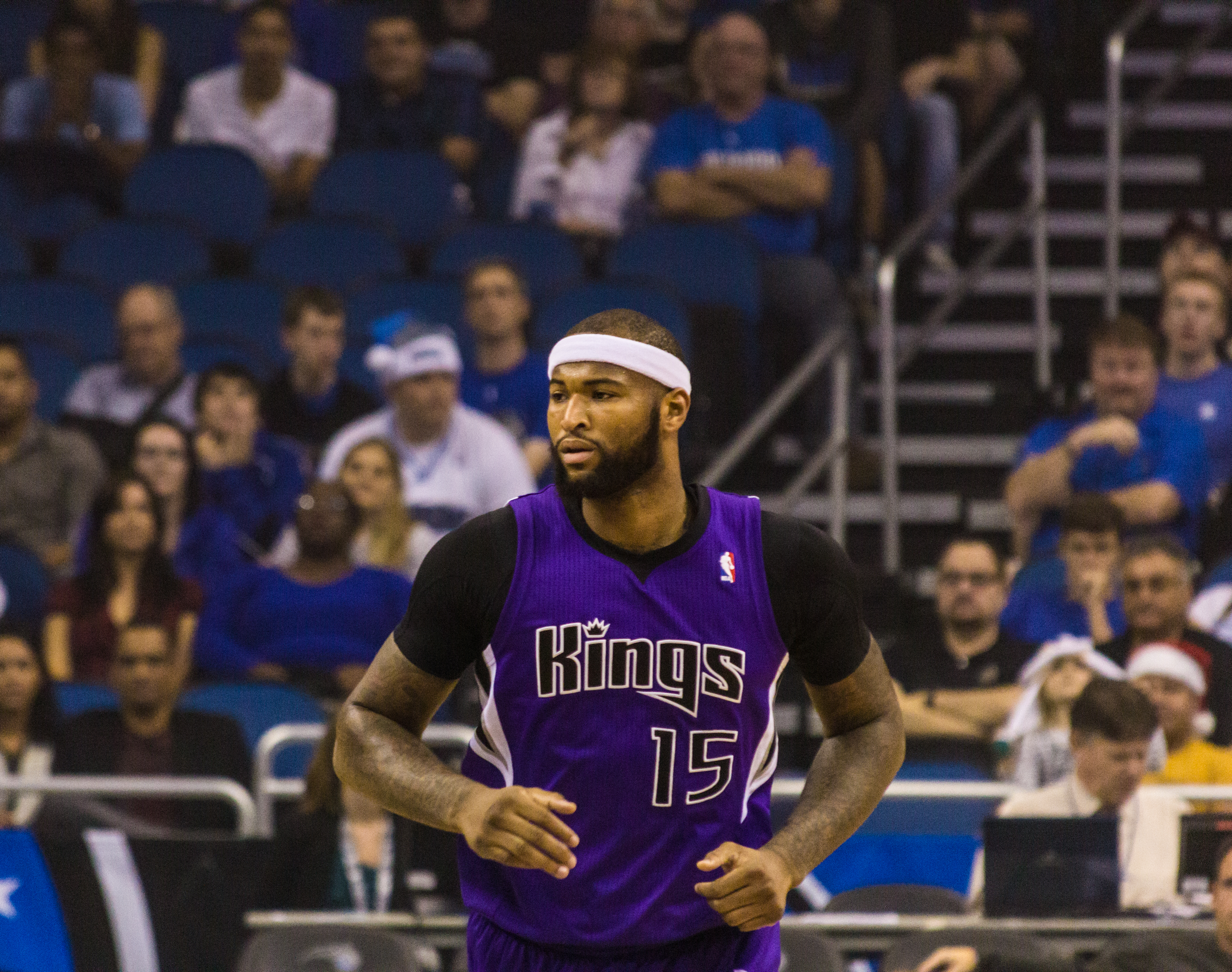
Cousins with the Kings in December 2013

On September 30, 2013, Cousins signed a reported four-year, $62 million contract extension with the Kings. After signing the contract, Cousins announced he would donate $1 million of his salary to the families and community of Sacramento. He opened the season with a 30-point, 14-rebound performance against the Denver Nuggets.

On February 26, 2014, Cousins received a one-game suspension for punching Patrick Beverley in the stomach. On March 11, Cousins recorded a career-high 6 blocks, along with 13 points and 14 rebounds, in an 89–99 loss to the Detroit Pistons.

==== 2014–16: First All-Star and All-NBA appearances ====
After averaging career-highs of 23.5 points, 12.6 rebounds and 1.5 blocks over the first 15 games of the season, Cousins was diagnosed with viral meningitis on December 7, 2014. He subsequently missed 10 games with the virus and showed no signs of a let up in his return to action on December 18 against the Milwaukee Bucks as he recorded 27 points and 11 rebounds in the 107–108 loss.

On January 30, 2015, Cousins was named to replace the injured Kobe Bryant as a Western Conference All-Star in the 2015 NBA All-Star Game. Cousins' selection marked the first time a Kings player earned All-Star honors since Brad Miller and Peja Stojaković represented Sacramento in 2004.

On April 1, 2015, Cousins recorded his second career triple-double with 24 points, 21 rebounds, 10 assists, 6 blocks and 3 steals in a 111–115 loss to the Houston Rockets. In doing so, he became just the fourth player in NBA history to collect 20+ points, 20+ rebounds, 10+ assists and 5+ blocks in a single game, joining Kareem Abdul-Jabbar, Chris Webber and Tim Duncan. In the following game on April 3 against the New Orleans Pelicans, Cousins became the first Kings player to record back-to-back triple doubles since Chris Webber did so in 2005. In just under 42 minutes of action, he recorded 24 points, 20 rebounds and a career-high 13 assists in a 95–101 loss. He joined elite company as one of only three players to have consecutive 20-point, 20-rebound, 10-assist games; the others being Elgin Baylor and Wilt Chamberlain.

On October 28, 2015, Cousins recorded 32 points and 13 rebounds, as well as 4-of-5 three-pointers, in a season opening loss to the Los Angeles Clippers. Cousins had hit just four three-pointers in his previous 167 games and had never hit more than four in an entire season. After missing four games with an Achilles injury between November 3–7, Cousins returned to action on November 9, and recorded 21 points and 12 rebounds in a loss to the San Antonio Spurs. Cousins went 4-of-5 from three-point range for a second time on November 11, finishing the game with 33 points to help the Kings defeat the Detroit Pistons 101–92. Two days later, he scored a season-high 40 points in a 111–109 win over the Brooklyn Nets. On November 16, he was named Western Conference Player of the Week for games played Monday, November 9 through Sunday, November 15. It was the third career Player of the Week award for Cousins, who led the Kings to a 3–1 record on the week.

On January 4, 2016, Cousins recorded 33 points and a season-high 19 rebounds in a 116–104 win over the Oklahoma City Thunder. On January 21, in a win over the Atlanta Hawks, he recorded 24 points and 15 rebounds for his ninth straight double-double and his 24th of the season in 34 games. On January 23, he scored a career-high 48 points in a 108–97 win over the Indiana Pacers. On January 25, he was named Western Conference Player of the Week for a second time in 2015–16. He went on to top his career-high mark in emphatic fashion that night, scoring 56 points in a 129–128 double overtime loss to the Charlotte Hornets. His 56 points set a record for the 2015–16 season, and broke Chris Webber's franchise record of 51 points. On January 28, he was named a Western Conference All-Star reserve for the 2016 NBA All-Star Game, earning his second straight All-Star nod. On February 5, he recorded his first triple-double of the season and fourth of his career with 24 points, 10 rebounds and 10 assists in a 128–119 loss to the Brooklyn Nets. On February 19, he had 37 points, 20 rebounds and four blocks against the Denver Nuggets, recording his ninth career double-double with 20-plus points and rebounds, breaking the previous Sacramento record set by Webber.

==== 2016–17: Final season in Sacramento ====
In the Kings' season opener on October 26, Cousins scored a game-high 24 points in a 113–94 win over the Phoenix Suns. He backed that up the following night against the San Antonio Spurs, recording 37 points and 16 rebounds in a 102–94 loss. On October 31, with 14 points and 12 rebounds against the Atlanta Hawks, Cousins became the Kings' career double-doubles leader with 246, surpassing Chris Webber's 245. On November 18, he scored a season-high 38 points in a 121–115 loss to the Los Angeles Clippers. On December 20, he set a new season high with 55 points in a 126–121 win over the Portland Trail Blazers. On January 18, 2017, he recorded his fifth career triple-double with 25 points, 12 rebounds and 10 assists in a 106–100 loss to the Indiana Pacers. On January 30, 2017, he was named Western Conference Player of the Week for games played January 23 through January 29. On February 3, 2017, Cousins recorded his sixth career triple-double with 22 points, 12 rebounds and 12 assists in a 105–103 loss to the Phoenix Suns. Four days later, he was suspended one game without pay for receiving his 16th technical foul of the 2016–17 season. In addition, Cousins was fined $25,000 for making an inappropriate statement and gesture after leaving the playing court following the Kings' 109–106 overtime win against the Golden State Warriors on February 4 at Golden 1 Center.

=== New Orleans Pelicans (2017–2018) ===
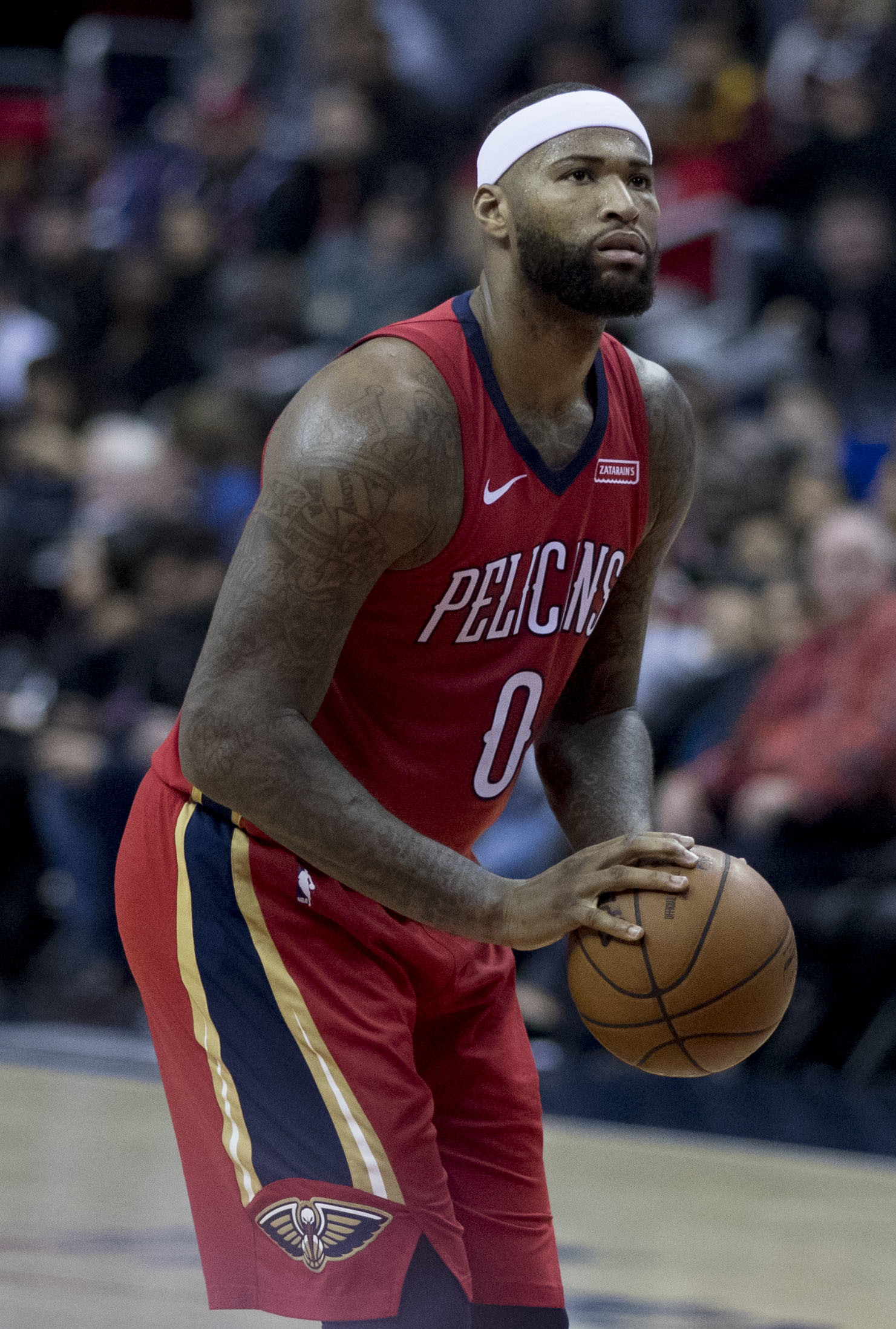
Cousins with New Orleans in 2017

On February 20, 2017, Cousins and teammate Omri Casspi were traded to the New Orleans Pelicans in exchange for Tyreke Evans, Buddy Hield, Langston Galloway, and 2017 first-round and second-round draft picks. He made his debut for the Pelicans three days later, recording 27 points and 14 rebounds in a 129–99 loss to the Houston Rockets. On March 3, 2017, he had 19 points and a season-high 23 rebounds in a 101–98 overtime loss to the San Antonio Spurs. His 23 rebounds tied the Pelicans' franchise record held by Tyson Chandler. Two days later, he had 26 points and 15 rebounds before fouling out in the Pelicans' 105–97 win over the Los Angeles Lakers, marking Cousins' first win as a Pelican. On March 21, 2017, Cousins had his most prolific performance as a Pelican, recording 41 points and 17 rebounds in a 95–82 win over the Memphis Grizzlies. Ten days later, he had 37 points and 13 rebounds in his first game against Sacramento, a game the Pelicans won 117–89. Cousins tied a career high during the game with five three-pointers.

On October 26, 2017, Cousins recorded 41 points and 23 rebounds in a 114–106 win over the Kings in Sacramento. Two days later, he recorded his first triple-double of the season with 29 points, 12 rebounds and 10 assists in a 123–101 win over the Cleveland Cavaliers. He was subsequently named Western Conference Player of the Week for games played October 23–29. On November 3, 2017, he had 20 points, 22 rebounds and seven assists in a 99–94 win over the Dallas Mavericks, tying his career high with 20 defensive rebounds. On December 2, 2017, he scored 38 points in a 123–116 win over the Portland Trail Blazers. Four days later, he had 40 points, 22 rebounds and four blocks in a 123–114 win over the Denver Nuggets. On December 29, 2017, he had 32 points and 20 rebounds in a 128–120 loss to the Dallas Mavericks. It was his third game of the season with at least 30 points and 20 rebounds, making him the first player to do that since Kevin Love in 2010–11.

On January 22, 2018, Cousins had 44 points, 24 rebounds and 10 assists in a 132–128 double overtime win over the Chicago Bulls. He became the first NBA player since Hall of Famer Kareem Abdul-Jabbar in 1972 to have as many as 40 points, 20 rebounds and 10 assists in a game. It was also just the 10th 40-point, 20-rebound, 10-assist game in NBA history. On January 26, 2018, he had 15 points, 13 rebounds and 11 assists before injuring his left Achilles in the final seconds of the Pelicans' 115–113 win over the Houston Rockets. Following the game, he was diagnosed with a torn left Achilles, and on January 31, he underwent season-ending surgery.

=== Golden State Warriors (2018–2019) ===
After not receiving any outstanding contract offers from other teams, Cousins turned his attention to signing with an elite team on the midlevel exception. Cousins called Golden State general manager Bob Myers about joining the Warriors and followed this by speaking to Kevin Durant, Stephen Curry and Draymond Green. He subsequently accepted the Warriors' midlevel exception, signing a one-year deal worth $5.3 million on July 6, 2018. On December 10, 2018, with Cousins nearing a return to the court for the first time since rupturing his left Achilles tendon, he was assigned to Golden State's NBA G League affiliate team, the Santa Cruz Warriors, where he had his first full-contact practice following his Achilles rupture. On January 18, 2019, Cousins made his debut for the Warriors, scoring 14 points in the 112–94 win over the Los Angeles Clippers. On April 2, he scored a season-high 28 points to go with 13 rebounds in a 116–102 win over the Denver Nuggets. On April 16, Cousins was ruled out indefinitely after suffering a torn left quadriceps in Game 2 of the first round of the playoffs. He made a return in Game 1 of the 2019 NBA Finals against the Toronto Raptors, coming off the bench in his first NBA Finals game. The Warriors lost the series in six games.

=== Los Angeles Lakers (2019–2020) ===
Cousins signed a one-year contract with the Los Angeles Lakers for 2019–20. He was reunited with Anthony Davis, his former teammate on the New Orleans Pelicans. However, Cousins tore his left anterior cruciate ligament (ACL) in an offseason pickup game in August and never played a game for the Lakers. They were granted a $1.75 million disabled player exception for Cousins and waived him on February 23, 2020, to sign Markieff Morris. The Lakers won the NBA Finals that season and had Cousins' name engraved on each of their championship rings. They presented him a ring as well.

=== Houston Rockets (2020–2021) ===
On December 1, 2020, Cousins signed a one-year contract with the Houston Rockets. On December 2, the Rockets traded for John Wall, his good friend and former college teammate. On February 23, 2021, the Rockets waived Cousins. In 25 games with the Rockets, he averaged 9.6 points and 7.6 rebounds in 20.2 minutes.

=== Los Angeles Clippers (2021) ===
On April 5, 2021, Cousins signed a 10-day contract with the Los Angeles Clippers. On April 16, he signed a second 10-day contract and ten days later, he signed for the rest of the season. With the Clippers, he played a total of 16 games, all on the bench. in these 16 games he averaged 7.8 points 4.5 rebounds and 1 assists. His season high with the Clippers was 16 points in a loss to the New Orleans Pelicans.

=== Milwaukee Bucks (2021–2022) ===
On November 30, 2021, Cousins signed with the defending champion Milwaukee Bucks. On December 24, Cousins scored a season-high 22 points alongside grabbing 8 rebounds in a 102–95 win over the Dallas Mavericks. On January 6, 2022, he was waived. During his 17-game tenure with the Bucks, Cousins started 5 games and averaged 9.1 points, 5.8 rebounds, and 1.1 assists in 16.9 minutes per game.

=== Denver Nuggets (2022) ===
On January 21, 2022, Cousins signed a 10-day contract with the Denver Nuggets, reuniting with his former coach Michael Malone. On January 28, he was given a second 10-day contract. On February 10, he signed a third 10-day contract. On February 25, the Nuggets signed Cousins for the remainder of the season. On March 4, Cousins scored a season-high 31 points, along with nine rebounds, four assists, and three steals in a 116–101 win over the Houston Rockets. His 31 points in 24 minutes were the fewest minutes in a 30-point game in Nuggets franchise history and the third fewest minutes played in a 30-point game in his career, as well as his third career 30-point game in 25 minutes or fewer, equalling Freeman Williams for the most such games in the shot clock era.

On January 13, 2023, the Los Angeles Lakers hosted Cousins for a workout.

=== Mets de Guaynabo (2023) ===
In April 2023, Cousins signed a contract to join the Guaynabo Mets in Puerto Rico's Baloncesto Superior Nacional league. During the 2023 season he averaged 20.4 points, 10.9 rebounds and 4.5 assists per game in 25.48 minutes per game. He shot 44% from the 3 point line, and 69% in free throws. Cousins led the team to the Playoffs and semi-finals but was unable to make the finals after being eliminated by the Gigantes de Carolina in 7 games. He was injured at the beginning of Game 6 with the expectation of being out for one week.

=== Taiwan Beer Leopards (2024) ===
On December 18, 2023, Cousins signed a contract to join the Taiwan Beer Leopards in Taiwan's T1 League. The plan was to initially compete in four home games scheduled for January 2024, with the decision to continue participating based on Cousins.

On February 23, 2024, Cousins announced that he is done trying to make an NBA comeback. When a reporter had asked him if he plans on returning to the NBA in an interview, Cousins said "Honestly, no. I know I’ve had my time there. You know, there was a point where I was trying to make that happen. But the place I'm in my life now, just with everything I’ve got going on, just outside of basketball, like I'm in a good place. So, like I said, I'm excited for what I have ahead and my future. You know, my 12 years in the league were a small chapter or chapters in my life. And, I'm ready to move on to the next and see what's in store for me." On March 18, Cousins re-signed with the Taiwan Beer Leopards. On May 15, Cousins was awarded the T1 League Most Popular Player of the Year for the 2023–24 season. On June 1, Cousins was awarded the Finals MVP in the 2024 T1 League Finals.

On June 19, 2024, Cousins joined the Taiwan Mustangs of The Asian Tournament (TAT).

=== Selenge Bodons (2025) ===
On January 10, 2025, Cousins signed with the Selenge Bodons of The League in Mongolia. Meanwhile, he briefly joined the Strong Group Athletics in the Dubai International Basketball Championship.

=== Second stint with Guaynabo (2025) ===
On April 24, 2025, it was confirmed that Cousins was returning to play for the Guaynabo Mets for the 2025 BSN season. On May 6, he played his first game back with the Mets against Capitanes de Arecibo, where he recorded 11 points, 9 rebounds and 8 assists in just 21 minutes, helping Guaynabo win 107–90. On 10 June, Cousins was restrained after clashing with fans who had thrown beer on him. He was later suspended for the rest of the season. On June 11, the Mets terminated Cousins’ contract.

== National team career ==
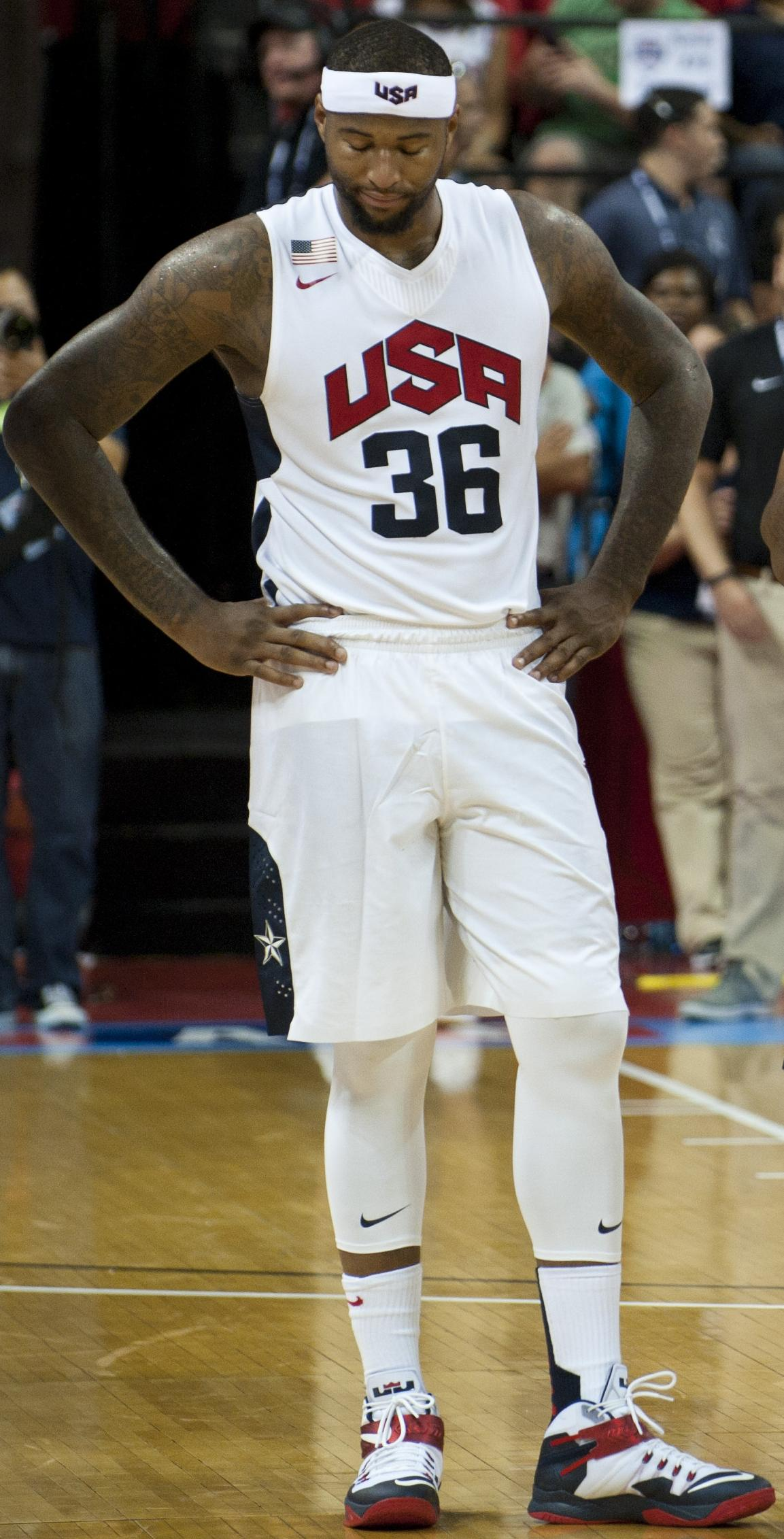
Cousins with Team USA in 2014

Cousins was a member of the United States national team that won the gold medal at the 2014 FIBA Basketball World Cup. He won a second gold medal with the 2016 Olympic team in Rio de Janeiro, Brazil.

== Career statistics ==
Legend
GP	Games played	GS	Games started	MPG	Minutes per game
FG%	Field goal percentage	3P%	3-point field goal percentage	FT%	Free throw percentage
RPG	Rebounds per game	APG	Assists per game	SPG	Steals per game
BPG	Blocks per game	PPG	Points per game	**Bold**	Career high

=== NBA ===
==== Regular season ====
Year	Team	GP	GS	MPG	FG%	3P%	FT%	RPG	APG	SPG	BPG	PPG
2010–11	Sacramento	**81**	62	28.5	.430	.167	.687	8.6	2.5	1.0	.8	14.1
2011–12	Sacramento	64	62	30.5	.448	.143	.702	11.0	1.6	1.5	1.2	18.1
2012–13	Sacramento	75	**74**	30.5	.465	.182	.738	9.9	2.7	1.4	.7	17.1
2013–14	Sacramento	71	71	32.4	.496	.000	.726	11.7	2.9	1.5	1.3	22.7
2014–15	Sacramento	59	59	34.1	.467	.250	**.782**	12.7	3.6	1.5	**1.8**	24.1
2015–16	Sacramento	65	65	34.6	.451	.333	.718	11.5	3.3	**1.6**	1.4	26.9
2016–17	Sacramento	55	55	34.4	.451	.356	.770	10.6	4.8	1.4	1.3	**27.8**
2016–17	New Orleans	17	17	33.8	.452	.375	.777	12.5	3.9	1.5	1.1	24.4
2017–18	New Orleans	48	48	**36.2**	.470	.354	.746	**12.9**	**5.4**	**1.6**	1.6	25.2
2018–19	Golden State	30	30	25.7	.480	.274	.736	8.2	3.6	1.3	1.5	16.3
2020–21	Houston	25	11	20.2	.376	.336	.746	7.6	2.4	.8	.7	9.6
2020–21	L.A. Clippers	16	0	12.9	**.537**	**.421**	.682	4.5	1.0	.8	.4	7.8
2021–22	Milwaukee	17	5	16.9	.466	.271	.816	5.8	1.1	.9	.5	9.1
2021–22	Denver	31	2	13.9	.456	.324	.736	5.5	1.7	.6	.4	8.9
Career		654	561	29.8	.460	.331	.737	10.2	3.0	1.3	1.1	19.6
All-Star		4	0	10.4	.800	.500	.667	3.7	.3	.3	.0	9.3

==== Playoffs ====
Year	Team	GP	GS	MPG	FG%	3P%	FT%	RPG	APG	SPG	BPG	PPG
2019	Golden State	**8**	**5**	**16.6**	.396	.250	.640	**4.9**	**2.4**	**.6**	**.8**	7.6
2021	L.A. Clippers	7	0	8.3	.452	.400	**.786**	2.0	.7	.3	.4	7.6
2022	Denver	5	0	11.4	**.655**	**.667**	.733	3.4	1.2	**.6**	.2	**10.6**
Career		20	5	12.4	.476	.392	.704	3.5	1.5	.5	.5	8.4

=== College ===
Year	Team	GP	GS	MPG	FG%	3P%	FT%	RPG	APG	SPG	BPG	PPG
2009–10	Kentucky	38	38	23.5	.558	.167	.604	9.8	1.0	1.0	1.8	15.1

== Personal life ==
Cousins is the son of Monique and Jessie Cousins. He has four sisters and one brother, Jaleel, who is also a professional basketball player.

Cousins has two children. He married his longtime girlfriend Morgan Lang in Atlanta on August 24, 2019.

In August 2019, Cousins was captured on an audio recording threatening to kill his ex-girlfriend after she refused to let their son attend his wedding. An arrest warrant was placed on Cousins for a misdemeanor domestic violence charge and a third-degree harassing communications charge. The charges, filed in Alabama, were dropped in November.
