= 2014 FIBA Basketball World Cup seeding =

The draw for the 2014 FIBA Basketball World Cup took place on 3 February 2014 at 19:00 CET at the Palau de la Música Catalana, Barcelona. The draw ceremony determined the groups in which the 32 participating teams would begin the final tournament. Teams were divided into six pots of four teams, with each team being selected from each pot to assigned groups.

The three best-qualified teams as per the latest FIBA World Rankings at the time were placed in Pot 1. The 20 other teams were placed in Pots 2 to 6, also according to ranking, geographical principles, and sporting criteria. The draw sequence began with Pot 1 and ended with Pot 6, and a competition number was drawn for each team, which determined its position in the group and the order of games in each group, such as "A1" to "A6", for Group A teams.

== Personnel involved ==
Former Spanish national team member Juan Antonio San Epifanio, Croatia's Dino Rađa, José Ortiz of Puerto Rico and Angolan Jean-Jacques Conceição assisted in the draw.

== Seeding ==
Teams were seeded using the latest FIBA World Rankings and geographical principles at the time of the draw, with some pots containing teams from the same continent. The highest-ranked team not to qualify for the World Cup was sixth-ranked Russia.

Pot 1	Pot 2	Pot 3	Pot 4	Pot 5	Pot 6
United States (1); Spain (2) (H); Argentina (3); Lithuania (4)	Angola (15); Finland (39); Senegal (41); Egypt (46)	New Zealand (19); Iran (20); South Korea (31); Philippines (34)	Serbia (11); Slovenia (13); Croatia (16); Ukraine (45)	Brazil (10); Puerto Rico (17); Mexico (24); Dominican Republic (26)	Greece (5); Turkey (7); France (8); Australia (9)

Notes

- H : Hosts

== Final Draw ==
The four groups were formed randomly, selecting one team from each of the six pots. There were no restrictions in drawing teams from pots except for the following:

- Spain and the United States, as the top 2 teams, were to be placed on opposite sides of the bracket for knockout play. As a result, Spain went to Group A and the US to Group C. The other teams in the pot would thus be drawn to either Group B or D.
- Finland could not be placed in a group that already had a European team; therefore they could only be placed in the group containing the USA or Argentina.
- Australia could not be placed in a group that already contained New Zealand. They were also required to be put into a group that already had two European teams.

After each team was drawn, FIBA assigned a host city to each group, except for final phase host cities Madrid and Barcelona.

Group A (Granada)	Group B (Seville)	Group C (Bilbao)	Group D (Las Palmas)
Spain	Philippines	Dominican Republic	Slovenia
Serbia	Senegal	Turkey	Lithuania
France	Puerto Rico	United States	Angola
Brazil	Argentina	Finland	South Korea
Egypt	Greece	New Zealand	Mexico
Iran	Croatia	Ukraine	Australia
