= 2014 FIBA Basketball World Cup final =

Basketball game in Madrid, Spain

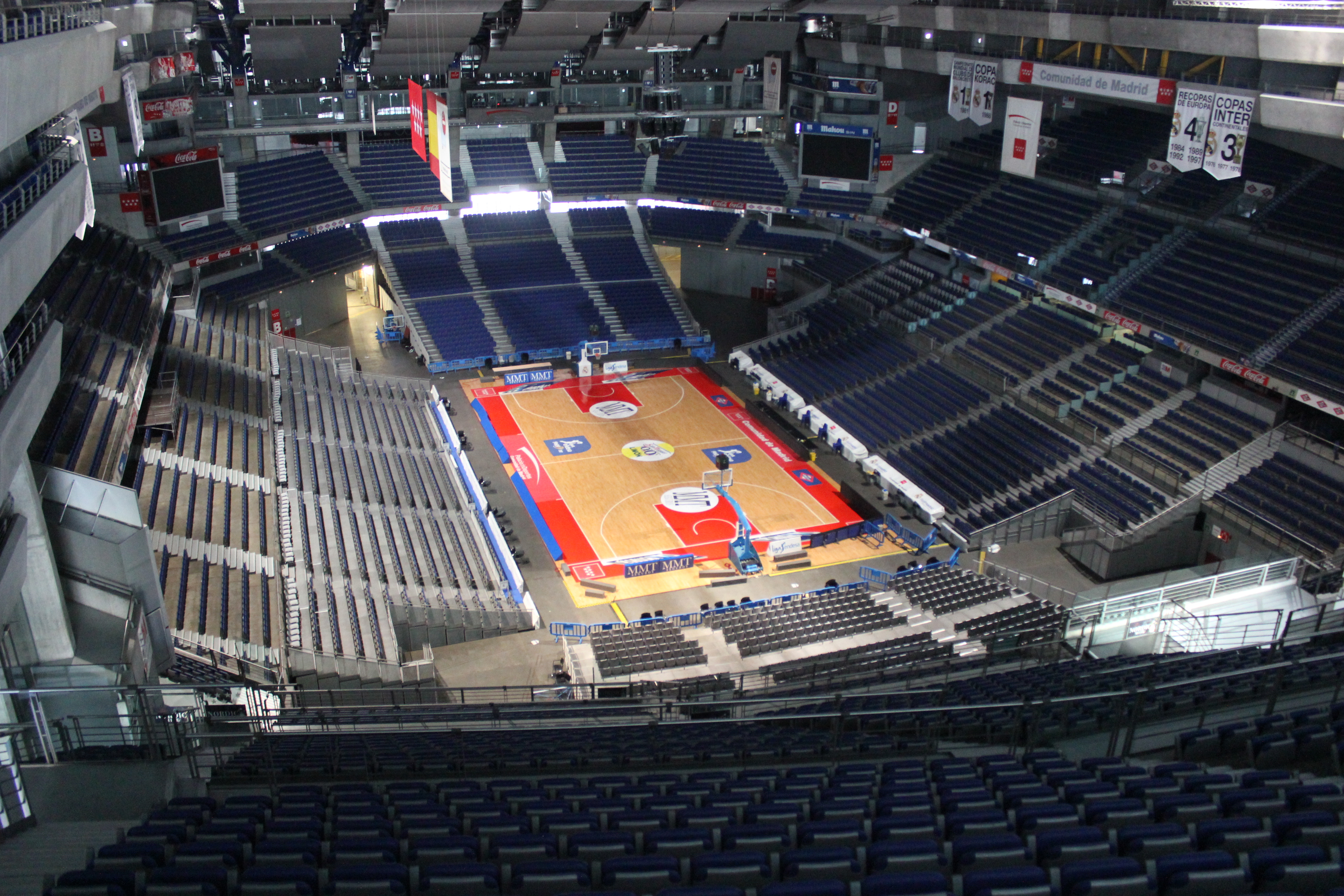
- Barclaycard Center, the venue of the 2014 FIBA Basketball World Cup final
- Event: 2014 FIBA Basketball World Cup
United States	Serbia
(United States)	(Serbia)
129	92
	1	2	3	4	Total
United States	35	32	38	24	129
Serbia	21	20	26	25	92
- Date: 23 September 2014
- Venue: Palacio de Deportes de la Comunidad de Madrid, Madrid
- Coaches: Mike Krzyzewski (USA); Aleksandar Đorđević (Serbia)
- Referees: Stephen Seibel; Borys Ryzhyk; Eddie Viator
- Attendance: 13,673

The 2014 FIBA Basketball World Cup final was a basketball game that took place on 14 September 2014 at Palacio de Deportes de la Comunidad de Madrid in Madrid, Spain, to determine the winner of the 2014 FIBA Basketball World Cup.

This was the first time the United States and Serbia, after the secession of Montenegro, played against each other. With the United States victory, they tied Yugoslavia[Serbia] with five titles, the most in this competition. They also qualified to the 2016 Summer Olympics.

== Route to the final ==
United States
Round
Serbia
Opponent
Result
Group stage
Opponent
Result
Finland
114–55
Match 1
Egypt
85–64
Turkey
98–77
Match 2
France
73–74
New Zealand
98–71
Match 3
Iran
83–70
Dominican Republic
106–71
Match 4
Brazil
73–81
Ukraine
95–71
Match 5
Spain
73–89

Pos	Team	Pld	W	L	PF	PA	PD	Pts	Qualification
1	United States	5	5	0	511	345	+166	10	Round of 16
2	Turkey	5	3	2	365	372	−7	8	Round of 16
3	Dominican Republic	5	2	3	347	386	−39	7 (Note: Head-to-head record: Dominican Republic 1–1 (1.022 GAvg), New Zealand 1–1 (0.993 GAvg), Ukraine 1–1 (0.985 GAvg),)	Round of 16
4	New Zealand	5	2	3	347	376	−29	7	Round of 16
5	Ukraine	5	2	3	344	369	−25	7	
6	Finland	5	1	4	342	408	−66	6	

Source: FIBA archive
Rules for classification: 1) points; 2) head-to-head points; 3) head-to-head goal average; 4) head-to-head number of points scored.
Notes:
Final standing

Pos	Team	Pld	W	L	PF	PA	PD	Pts	Qualification
1	Spain (H)	5	5	0	440	314	+126	10	Round of 16
2	Brazil	5	4	1	416	333	+83	9	Round of 16
3	France	5	3	2	376	357	+19	8	Round of 16
4	Serbia	5	2	3	387	378	+9	7	Round of 16
5	Iran	5	1	4	344	406	−62	6	
6	Egypt	5	0	5	311	486	−175	5	

Source: FIBA archive
Rules for classification: 1) points; 2) head-to-head points; 3) head-to-head goal average; 4) head-to-head number of points scored.
(H) Hosts
Opponent
Result
Knockout stage
Opponent
Result
Mexico
86–63
Round of 16
Greece
90–72
Slovenia
119–76
Quarter-finals
Brazil
84–56
Lithuania
96–68
Semifinals
France
90–85

=== United States ===
The Americans qualified by virtue of being the defending Olympic champions, after defeating Spain in the 2012 gold medal game. The United States were one of the seeded teams in the draw. They were ultimately drawn into Group C with Turkey, New Zealand, Dominican Republic, Finland and Ukraine.

The United States faced wild cards Finland in their first game. The United States never looked back after, erecting a 60–18 lead at halftime, to score its first win. In the rematch of 2010's final, Turkey had a 5-point advantage at the half, but the Americans outscored the Turks 63–37 in the second half, to notch their second win. In their next game, the United States again won easily, this time against New Zealand, to remain undefeated in group play. They then topped the group with a 106–71 victory against the Dominican Republic. Against Ukraine, the Americans closed out group play undefeated, netting a fifth consecutive double-digit victory.

In the round of 16, the United States withstood a 25-point game-high effort by Gustavo Ayón, to record a 23-point win against Mexico. The Slovenians faced the United States in the quarterfinals, holding the USA scoreless in the first two minutes, but once the Americans scored, they went on a 7–0 run, and never relinquished the lead. The semifinal was a rematch of the 2010 semifinal against Lithuania; the latter kept it close during the first quarter, until when Klay Thompson scored, to give the USA a 10–9 lead. The Lithuanians kept within striking distance throughout the first half, but an unanswered 10–0 USA run, at the beginning of the third quarter, sealed a return to the final for the USA.

=== Serbia ===
Serbia qualified by finishing seventh at FIBA EuroBasket 2013. The Serbs were drawn into Group A, together with hosts Spain, France, Brazil, Iran and Egypt.

In their first game, Serbia had an easy win against Egypt, with Miloš Teodosić scoring 15 points to lead the Serbs. The Serbs then faced France in their next game. The French trailed at halftime, but Edwin Jackson converted three three-pointers to keep France close. Boris Diaw tied the game with four seconds left, then Joffrey Lauvergne scored from the free-throw line, to give Serbia their first loss. In the next game, Hamed Haddadi's 29 points weren't enough for Iran, as Serbia won 83–70. Haddadi was foiled when Serbia forced him to commit his fourth foul, just before halftime. Although the Serbian players who guarded Haddadi also battled foul trouble, they pulled through in the end. The Serbs then lost to Brazil, with Marcus Vieira making 6 three-point shots. Serbia were assured of a final round berth by their last group game against Spain, but lost 73–89, to finish fourth in the group.

Serbia faced Group B winners Greece in the round of 16. After the Greeks had their first lead of the game late in the first half, Nikola Kalinić scored on a three-point play that gave them the lead for good. Serbia limited Greece to 13 points in the third quarter, en route to a win. Bogdan Bogdanović had a game-high 21 points, and four other Serbs scored in double figures, to send Serbia to the quarterfinals. All Group A teams qualified to the quarterfinals, with Brazil netting a rematch with Serbia. With Brazil within striking distance throughout the game, Tiago Splitter and Nenê were assessed technical fouls in the third quarter; Serbia had a seven-point possession, and never trailed again. France then defeated Spain, to arrange a rematch with Serbia in the semifinals. Serbia had a 9–0 run in the second period, to give them a 30–15 advantage. France cut the lead to ten, early in the fourth quarter. Boris Diaw, Nicolas Batum and Evan Fournier made three-pointers, to cut the deficit to four points, with five minutes left. Teodosić and Bogdanović scored their own three-pointers, to pad the lead to nine, when the French converted more three-pointers to cut the lead to three, with 48 seconds left. Thomas Heurtel converted both free-throws to cut the lead to one point, but Teodosić missed a field-goal. Heurtel split his free-throws off Teodosić's foul, then Serbia scored four points, Batum made a three-pointer for France, and Marko Simonović made both free-throws to seal the win for Serbia.

== Match details ==
This was the first meeting between Serbia and the United States at the World Cup.

Serbia made their first five shots of the game, to race to a 10–5 lead. After the U.S. timeout, Serbia scored anew, then the Americans had a 17–3 run to go up by seven. Kyrie Irving and Klay Thompson scored three-pointers, to give the USA a 35–21 lead. In the second quarter, the United States made six more three point shots, to give them a 26-point lead at the half. The Americans erected the largest lead, at 39 points midway through the third quarter. The final deficit of 37 points and the 129 points scored, were the largest in a World Cup final since the USA's 137–91 victory over Russia at the 1994 FIBA World Championship. The Americans also became the third team, after Brazil and Yugoslavia, to successfully defend the world title, and tied the Yugoslavs for having the most championships, with five.

The Americans shot 58% from the field and 50% from beyond the three-point line in the game, won all nine games by an average of 32.5 points, and qualified to the 2016 Summer Olympics. Kyrie Irving was named the tournament MVP.

After being defeated, the Serbian team was received by a raucous crowd, upon their return to Belgrade. This was the best finish of a national team featuring Serb players, since the 2002 FIBA World Championship in Indianapolis, where Yugoslavia defeated Argentina in the final.

14 September 2014
21:00

Boxscore

United States	129–92	Serbia
Scoring by quarter: 35–21, 32–20, 38–26, 24–25
Pts: Irving 26; Rebs: Cousins 9 Asts: Rose 6		Pts: Bjelica, Kalinić 18; Rebs: Marković 6 Asts: Teodosić 7

Palacio de Deportes de la Comunidad de Madrid, Madrid
Attendance: 13,673
Referees: Stephen Seibel (CAN), Borys Ryzhyk (UKR), Eddie Viator (FRA)

United States
Serbia

Players:			Pts.	Rebs.	Asts.
SG	4	Stephen Curry*	10	1	0
SG	5	Klay Thompson	12	0	2
PG	6	Derrick Rose	0	1	6
PF	7	Kenneth Faried*	12	7	0
PF	8	Rudy Gay	11	3	0
SF	9	DeMar DeRozan	10	1	1
PG	10	Kyrie Irving*	26	1	4
PF	11	Mason Plumlee	1	4	0
C	12	DeMarcus Cousins	11	9	1
SF	13	James Harden*	23	3	2
C	14	Anthony Davis*	7	4	0
C	15	Andre Drummond	6	2	0
Head coach:
(United States) Mike Krzyzewski

United States	Statistic	Serbia
30/48 (62.5%)	2-pt field goals	31/50 (62.0%)
15/30 (50%)	3-pt field goals	5/25 (20%)
24/29 (82.8%)	Free throws	15/21 (71.4%)
16	Offensive rebounds	12
28	Defensive rebounds	20
44	Total rebounds	32
16	Assists	20
8	Turnovers	10
4	Steals	3
7	Blocks	1
25	Fouls	27

Players:			Pts.	Rebs.	Asts.
PG	4	Miloš Teodosić*	10	0	7
F	5	Marko Simonović	0	0	0
G	6	Stefan Jović	6	2	3
SG	7	Bogdan Bogdanović	15	2	1
SF	8	Nemanja Bjelica*	18	3	4
PG	9	Stefan Marković*	3	6	3
F	10	Nikola Kalinić*	18	3	1
PF	11	Stefan Birčević	0	0	0
C	12	Nenad Krstić	4	1	0
C	13	Miroslav Raduljica*	9	3	0
C	14	Raško Katić	2	1	1
C	15	Vladimir Štimac	7	2	0
Head coach:
(Serbia) Aleksandar Đorđević

*– Starters
