= 2014 FIBA Basketball World Cup =

2014 edition of the FIBA Basketball World Cup

Copa Mundial de la FIBA España 2014

Tournament details
- Host country: Spain
- Dates: 30 August – 14 September
- Officially opened by: Felipe VI
- Teams: 24 (from 5 confederations)
- Venue: 6 (in 6 host cities)

Final positions
- Champions: United States (5th title)
- Runners-up: Serbia
- Third place: France
- Fourth place: Lithuania

Tournament statistics
- Games played: 76
- Attendance: 645,135 (8,489 per game)
- MVP: (United States) Kyrie Irving
- Top scorer: (Puerto Rico) J. J. Barea (22.0 points per game)

The 2014 FIBA Basketball World Cup was the 17th edition of the FIBA Basketball World Cup, the tournament previously known as the FIBA World Championship. The tournament was held from 30 August to 14 September 2014. Hosted by Spain, it was the last tournament to be held on the then-current four-year cycle. The next FIBA World Cup was held five years later, in 2019, to reset the four-year-cycle on a different year than the FIFA World Cup.

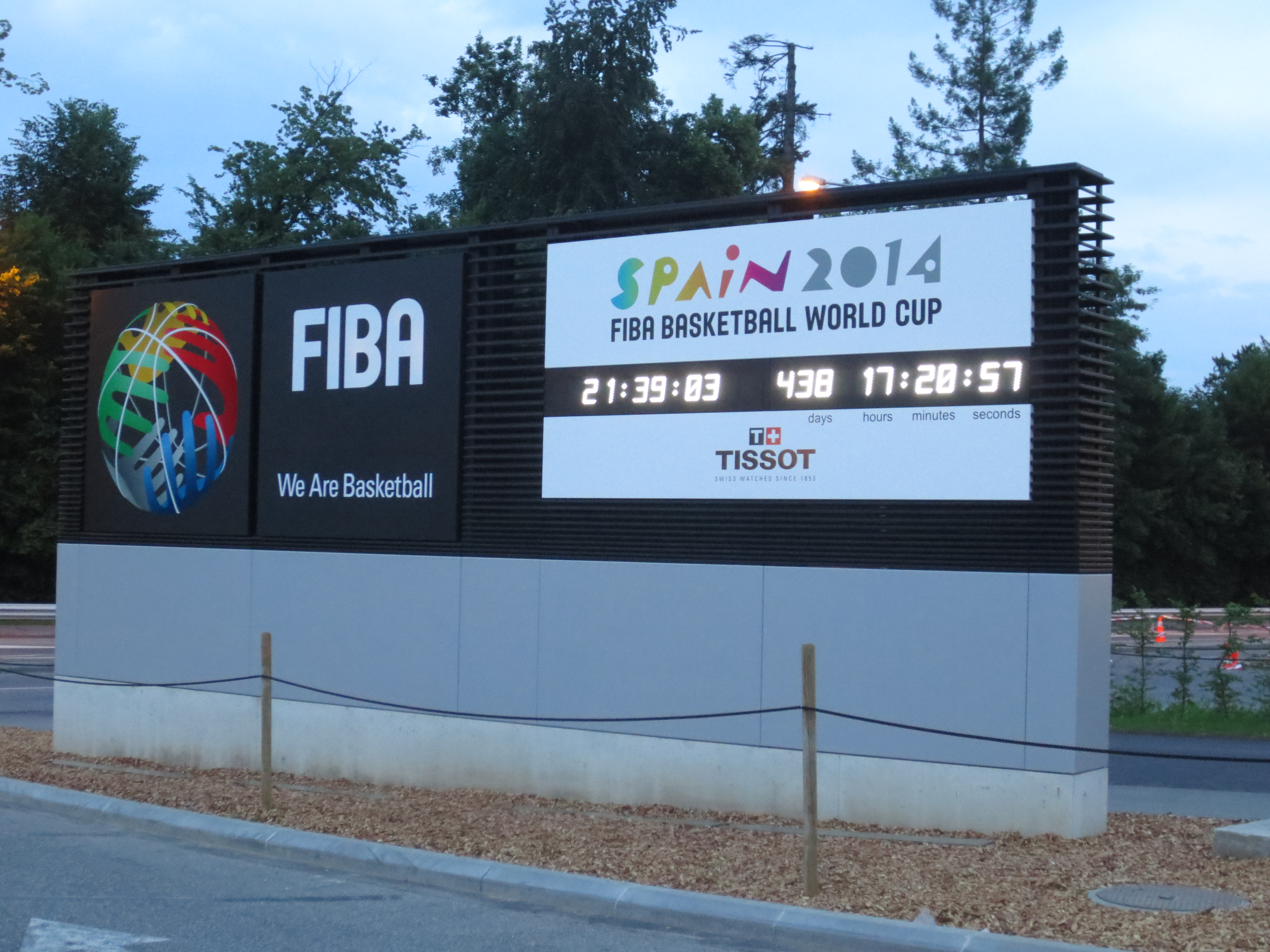
Countdown clock outside the FIBA headquarters in Mies, Switzerland as of June 2013.

The United States won their fifth world cup, after beating silver medal-winning Serbia in the Final. France claimed the third place, while Lithuania finished fourth in the tournament.

== Host selection ==
FIBA opened the bidding process on 10 January 2008 and all the letters of intent were submitted on 30 April 2008. Nine countries showed interest in hosting the event, as in order, they were Spain, France, Denmark, Russia, Saudi Arabia, Qatar, Italy, Greece, and China.

Among the nine, only three were shortlisted by FIBA: China which would have hosted the 2009 FIBA Asia Championship later that year, Italy which last hosted a FIBA tournament in EuroBasket Women 2007, and FIBA EuroBasket 2007 host Spain.

On 23 May 2009, after voting by the FIBA Central Board in Geneva in which the Chinese and Spanish representatives abstained, China was the first to be eliminated in the first round of voting. In the final round, Arvydas Sabonis and Saša Djordjević announced that Spain won the hosting rights with eleven votes as opposed to Italy's eight.

2014 FIBA Basketball World Cup bidding results (final round)
Nation	Votes
Spain	11
Italy	8
China	Eliminated

== Venues ==
The Palacio de Deportes de la Comunidad de Madrid was the main venue, hosting the final and half of the matches in the final round. While no arenas from the 1986 FIBA World Championship were reused, the current Madrid arena was built on the site of the original venue that was destroyed by fire in 2001, which was a venue used in 1986. Amongst venues used in FIBA EuroBasket 2007, the arenas in Granada, Seville and Madrid were reused. One arena, the Gran Canaria Arena, was the only new venue, being built after the tournament was awarded to Spain. The other cities hosted a group.

On 17 April 2010, Barcelona was added to the list of cities to hold games, bringing the total venues to six. This was Barcelona's first time being part of a major international event in basketball since the 1997 EuroBasket, in which the Palau Sant Jordi hosted the final stages. Barcelona will host half of the games in the knockout stage, including a semifinal.

Below is a list of the confirmed venues which were used to host games during the 2014 FIBA Basketball World Cup. Connor Floor was the official supplier of the basketball courts for each of the six sites.

Iberian Peninsula	Madrid	Barcelona	Granada
2014 FIBA Basketball World Cup is located in Spain	Palacio de Deportes de la Comunidad de Madrid; Capacity: 13,700	Palau Sant Jordi; Capacity: 15,700	Palacio Municipal de Deportes de Granada; Capacity: 9,507
2014 FIBA Basketball World Cup is located in Spain	Bilbao	Seville	Las Palmas
2014 FIBA Basketball World Cup is located in Spain	Bizkaia Arena; Capacity: 16,200	Palacio Municipal de Deportes San Pablo; Capacity: 7,200	Gran Canaria Arena; Capacity: 9,700
Canary Islands			
2014 FIBA Basketball World Cup is located in Canary Islands			

== Qualification ==
Teams qualified Teams failed to qualify Teams withdrew Teams did not enter

There were 24 teams taking part in the 2014 World Cup of Basketball. After the 2012 Olympics, the continental allocation for FIBA Americas was reduced by one when the United States won the Olympic tournament, automatically qualifying them for the 2014 World Cup.

- Host nation: 1 berth
- 2012 Summer Olympics: 12 teams competing for 1 berth, removed from that country's FIBA zone
- FIBA Asia: 15 teams competing for 3 berths
- FIBA Oceania: 2 teams competing for 2 berths
- FIBA Africa: 16 teams competing for 3 berths
- FIBA Americas: 10 teams competing for 4 berths
- FIBA Europe: 24 teams competing for 6 berths
- Wild card: 4 berths

=== Qualified teams ===
As of 21 September 2013, twenty teams had already qualified for the final tournament in 2014. To complete the 24-team tournament, FIBA would announce the four wild cards after a meeting in Barcelona on 1–2 February 2014; they could have announced an initial list of teams that would be considered after a Buenos Aires meeting on 23–24 November 2013. But later the FIBA Central Board decided not to trim the list of wild card applicants on their Buenos Aires meeting, making all 15 teams eligible to be selected on the February meeting at Barcelona.

On 1 February 2014, FIBA announced that it had allocated the wild cards to Brazil, Finland, Greece and Turkey.

Event	Date	Location	Berths	Qualified
Host nation	23 May 2009	(Switzerland) Geneva	1	Spain
2012 Olympics	29 July–12 August 2012	(United Kingdom) London	1	United States
2013 FIBA Africa Championship	20–31 August 2013	(Ivory Coast) Abidjan	3	Angola; Egypt; Senegal
2013 FIBA Americas Championship	30 August–11 September 2013	(Venezuela) Caracas	4	Mexico; Puerto Rico; Argentina; Dominican Republic
2013 FIBA Asia Championship	1–11 August 2013	(Philippines) Manila	3	Iran; Philippines; South Korea
FIBA EuroBasket 2013	4–22 September 2013	Slovenia	6	France; Lithuania; Croatia; Slovenia; Ukraine; Serbia
2013 FIBA Oceania Championship	14–18 August 2013	(New Zealand) Auckland (Australia) Canberra	2	Australia; New Zealand
Wild cards	1 February 2014	(Spain) Barcelona	4	Brazil; Finland; Greece; Turkey
TOTAL			24	

=== Suspension of Senegal ===
On the FIBA Central Board meeting in Buenos Aires, FIBA suspended the basketball federations of Guatemala, Morocco and Senegal indefinitely "due to their inability to properly function as the governing body for basketball in their respective countries." The Senegalese federation was suspended reportedly due to age fabrication in the 2013 FIBA Under-19 World Championship for Men and for Women; the Senegalese federation was dissolved as a result. On 2 February, FIBA lifted the suspension on the Senegalese federation after they complied with all of the requirements imposed by the FIBA, clearing the way for the participation of its national team in the tournament.

== Rule and format changes ==
This was the first time the NBA-style 4.90m rectangular free throw lane, the 1.25m restricted arc, and extended three point line (6.6 m [21' 8"] from the basket at the corners; 6.75 m [22' 1.75"] elsewhere) took effect in the tournament.

The final round was held in two arenas: in the Palacio de Deportes de la Comunidad de Madrid and Palau Sant Jordi, as opposed to a singular arena in 2010. Also, the arrangement of the round of 16 match-ups in the bracket were changed. In 2010, a team from Group A or B can meet a team from Group C or D as early in the quarterfinals, and cannot meet their groupmates until the semifinals. In 2014, teams from Groups A and B were in one half of the bracket played in Madrid, while teams from Groups C and D were in the other half and played in Barcelona; teams from Groups A and B could not meet teams from Group C or D until the final or third-place playoff, and could meet their groupmates as early as the quarterfinals.

In 2010, the round of 16 games were held in a span of four days, or two matches per day; in 2014, there would be four games per day, and the round of 16 will be done in two days. From the semifinals onward, unlike in 2010 where the semifinals were held in one day, and the third-place playoff and the final on the next day, the semifinals in 2014 were held on two days, followed by the third-place playoff the next day, and the final on the day after, or one game per day. Finally, the classification round for 5th place was also eliminated.

== Draw ==
The draw was held on 3 February 2014 at 19:00 CET at the Palau de la Música Catalana, Barcelona. On 2 February, FIBA released the pots on how the teams would be drawn. "Pot 1" included the top 4 teams in the FIBA World Rankings, while the other pots were grouped on geographical and sporting criteria.

Former Spanish international Juan Antonio San Epifanio, Croatia's Dino Rađa, José Ortiz of Puerto Rico and Angolan Jean-Jacques Conceição assisted in the draw.

Group A, which included European champions France, hosts Spain, and traditional powerhouse Serbia has been labeled as the "group of death". The Americans, meanwhile, avoided the "bracket of death" of Groups A and B by landing in Group C, setting up a rematch of the 2010 final against Turkey, which were selected as wild cards, and a possible late knockout match-up against European runners-up Lithuania.

=== Seeding ===
Pot 1	Pot 2	Pot 3	Pot 4	Pot 5	Pot 6
United States (1); Spain (2); Argentina (3); Lithuania (4)	Angola (15); Finland (39); Senegal (41); Egypt (46)	New Zealand (19); Iran (20); South Korea (31); Philippines (34)	Serbia (11); Slovenia (13); Croatia (16); Ukraine (45)	Brazil (10); Puerto Rico (17); Mexico (24); Dominican Republic (26)	Greece (5); Turkey (7); France (8); Australia (9)

== Squads ==
Each team had a roster of 12 players; a team could opt to have one naturalized player from its roster. The final rosters had to be finalized at the team managers' meeting at the night prior to the first game. The final roster of 12 players per team must have been taken from a list of at most 24 players submitted to FIBA two months before the beginning of the championship.

== Preparation matches ==
=== 2014 South American Basketball Championship ===
The 2014 South American Basketball Championship in Isla Margarita, Venezuela was a qualifying tournament for the 2015 FIBA Americas Championship and for the 2015 Pan-American Games. Venezuela defeated World Cup participants Argentina (who played with its "B" team) to win the title; the other team in the World Cup, Brazil (who also played with its "B" team), finished in third place defeating Uruguay. All four teams qualified to the 2015 FIBA Americas Championship while only the top three teams qualified to the 2015 Pan-American Games.

=== 2014 FIBA Asia Cup ===
The 2014 FIBA Asia Cup in Wuhan, China was a qualifying tournament for the 2015 FIBA Asia Championship in China. Iran defeated Chinese Taipei to win the title and qualify outright; the other team in the World Cup, the Philippines, defeated China in the third place playoff.

=== 2014 Centrobasket ===
The 2014 Centrobasket in Tepic, Mexico is a qualifying tournament for the 2015 FIBA Americas Championship and for the 2015 Pan-American Games. The three teams in the World Cup occupied the top three places. Mexico defeated Puerto Rico in the final, while Dominican Republic finished third place defeating Cuba. All four teams qualified to the 2015 FIBA Americas Championship while only the top three teams qualified to the 2015 Pan-American Games.

=== 2014 William Jones Cup ===
The 2014 William Jones Cup was a friendly tournament in New Taipei, Taiwan. Egypt is the only World Cup team participated; they finished third. Iran sent their "B-team", while South Korea sent in a Korean Basketball League team.

=== 2014 Antibes International Basketball tournament ===
Australia won this friendly tournament in Antibes, France organized by Fédération Française de Basket-Ball. The Philippines, France, and Ukraine were the other teams that participated.

== Preliminary round ==
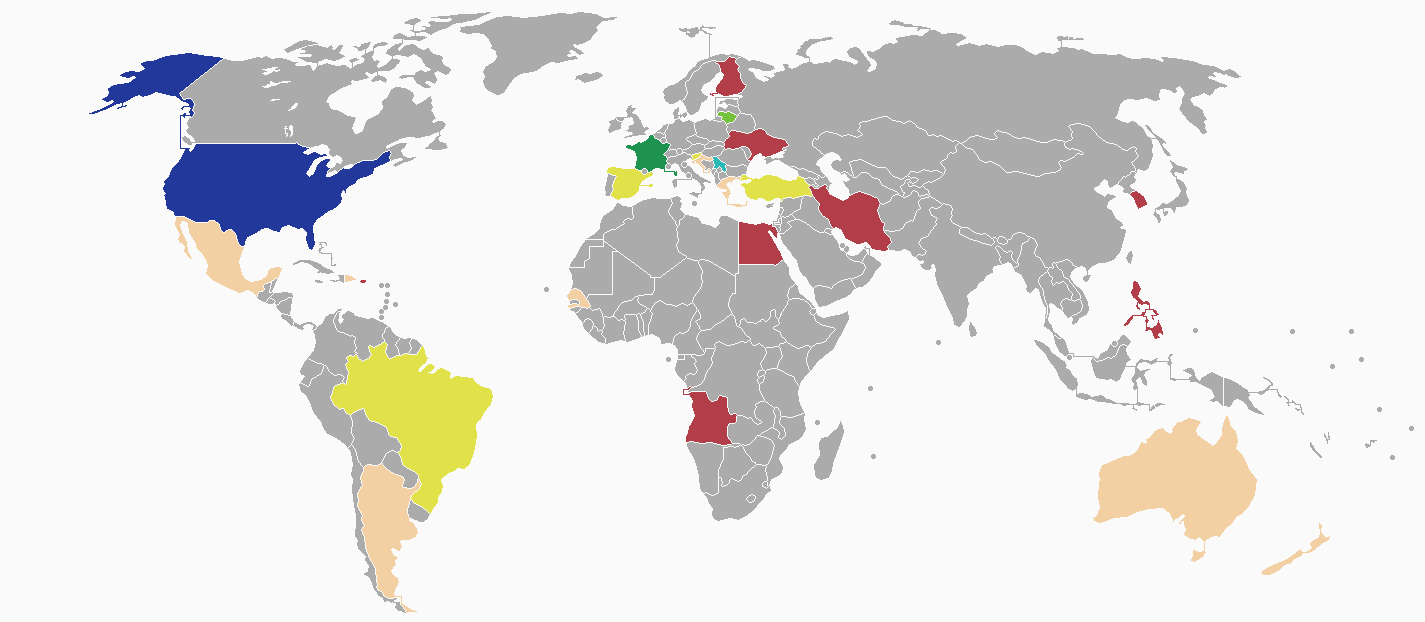
2014 FIBA World Championship final rankings.

How teams are ranked:

1. Highest number of points earned, with each game result having a corresponding point:
  - Win: 2 points
  - Loss: 1 point
  - Loss by default: 1 point, with a final score of 2–0 for the opponents of the defaulting team if the latter team is not trailing or if the score is tied, or the score at the time of stoppage if they are trailing.
  - Loss by forfeit: 0 points, with a final score of 20–0 for the opponents of the forfeiting team.
2. Head-to-head record via points system above
3. Goal average on games among tied teams
4. Goal average on all group games
5. Drawing of lots

Qualified to the final round

=== Group A ===
Venue: Palacio Municipal de Deportes de Granada, Granada

Pos	Team	Pld	W	L	PF	PA	PD	Pts	Qualification
1	Spain (H)	5	5	0	440	314	+126	10	Round of 16
2	Brazil	5	4	1	416	333	+83	9	Round of 16
3	France	5	3	2	376	357	+19	8	Round of 16
4	Serbia	5	2	3	387	378	+9	7	Round of 16
5	Iran	5	1	4	344	406	−62	6	
6	Egypt	5	0	5	311	486	−175	5	

Source: FIBA archive
Rules for classification: 1) points; 2) head-to-head points; 3) head-to-head goal average; 4) head-to-head number of points scored.
(H) Hosts

30 August 2014
Egypt	64–85	Serbia
France	63–65	Brazil
Iran	60–90	Spain
31 August 2014
Serbia	73–74	France
Brazil	79–50	Iran
Spain	91–54	Egypt
1 September 2014
Iran	70–83	Serbia
France	94–55	Egypt
Brazil	63–82	Spain
3 September 2014
Egypt	73–88	Iran
Serbia	73–81	Brazil
Spain	88–64	France
4 September 2014
Brazil	128–65	Egypt
Iran	76–81	France
Serbia	73–89	Spain

=== Group B ===
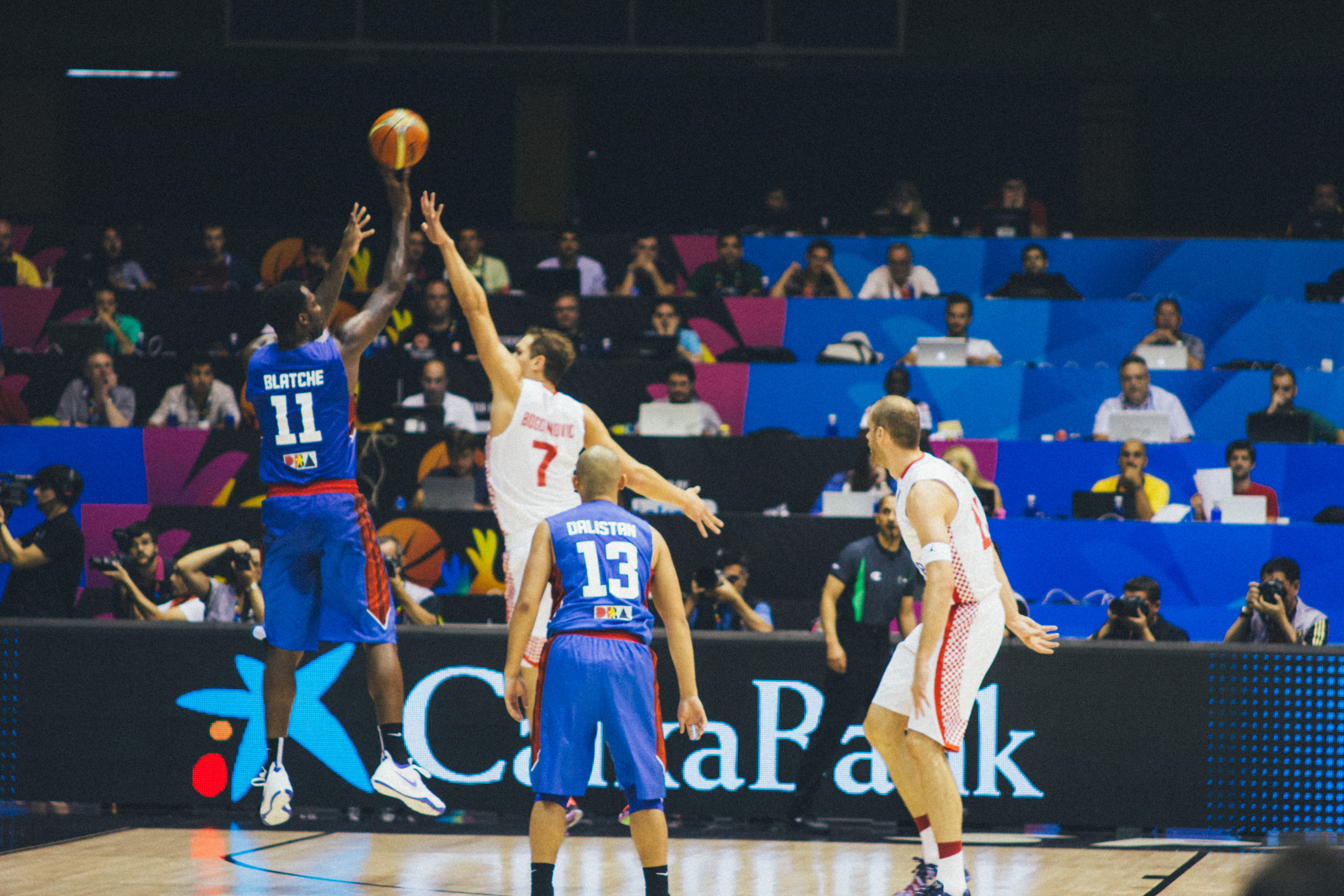
Croatia against Philippines

Venue: Palacio Municipal de Deportes San Pablo, Seville

Pos	Team	Pld	W	L	PF	PA	PD	Pts	Qualification
1	Greece	5	5	0	414	349	+65	10	Round of 16
2	Croatia	5	3	2	414	398	+16	8 (Note: Head-to-head record: Croatia 1–0 Argentina)	Round of 16
3	Argentina	5	3	2	420	371	+49	8	Round of 16
4	Senegal	5	2	3	348	399	−51	7	Round of 16
5	Puerto Rico	5	1	4	388	446	−58	6 (Note: Head-to-head record: Puerto Rico 1–0 Philippines)	
6	Philippines	5	1	4	383	404	−21	6	

Source: FIBA archive
Rules for classification: 1) points; 2) head-to-head points; 3) head-to-head goal average; 4) head-to-head number of points scored.
Notes:

30 August 2014
Croatia	81–78	OT	Philippines
Puerto Rico	75–98		Argentina
Greece	87–64		Senegal
31 August 2014
Argentina	85–90		Croatia
Senegal	82–75		Puerto Rico
Philippines	70–82		Greece
1 September 2014
Croatia	75–77		Senegal
Argentina	85–81		Philippines
Puerto Rico	79–90		Greece
3 September 2014
Philippines	73–77		Puerto Rico
Senegal	46–81		Argentina
Greece	76–65		Croatia
4 September 2014
Senegal	79–81	OT	Philippines
Croatia	103–82		Puerto Rico
Argentina	71–79		Greece

=== Group C ===
Venue: Bizkaia Arena, Barakaldo

Pos	Team	Pld	W	L	PF	PA	PD	Pts	Qualification
1	United States	5	5	0	511	345	+166	10	Round of 16
2	Turkey	5	3	2	365	372	−7	8	Round of 16
3	Dominican Republic	5	2	3	347	386	−39	7 (Note: Head-to-head record: Dominican Republic 1–1 (1.022 GAvg), New Zealand 1–1 (0.993 GAvg), Ukraine 1–1 (0.985 GAvg),)	Round of 16
4	New Zealand	5	2	3	347	376	−29	7	Round of 16
5	Ukraine	5	2	3	344	369	−25	7	
6	Finland	5	1	4	342	408	−66	6	

Source: FIBA archive
Rules for classification: 1) points; 2) head-to-head points; 3) head-to-head goal average; 4) head-to-head number of points scored.
Notes:

30 August 2014
Ukraine	72–62		Dominican Republic
New Zealand	73–76		Turkey
United States	114–55		Finland
31 August 2014
Dominican Republic	76–63		New Zealand
Finland	81–76		Ukraine
Turkey	77–98		United States
2 September 2014
Ukraine	64–58		Turkey
United States	98–71		New Zealand
Finland	68–74		Dominican Republic
3 September 2014
New Zealand	73–61		Ukraine
Turkey	77–73	OT	Finland
Dominican Republic	71–106		United States
4 September 2014
Finland	65–67		New Zealand
Ukraine	71–95		United States
Turkey	77–64		Dominican Republic

=== Group D ===
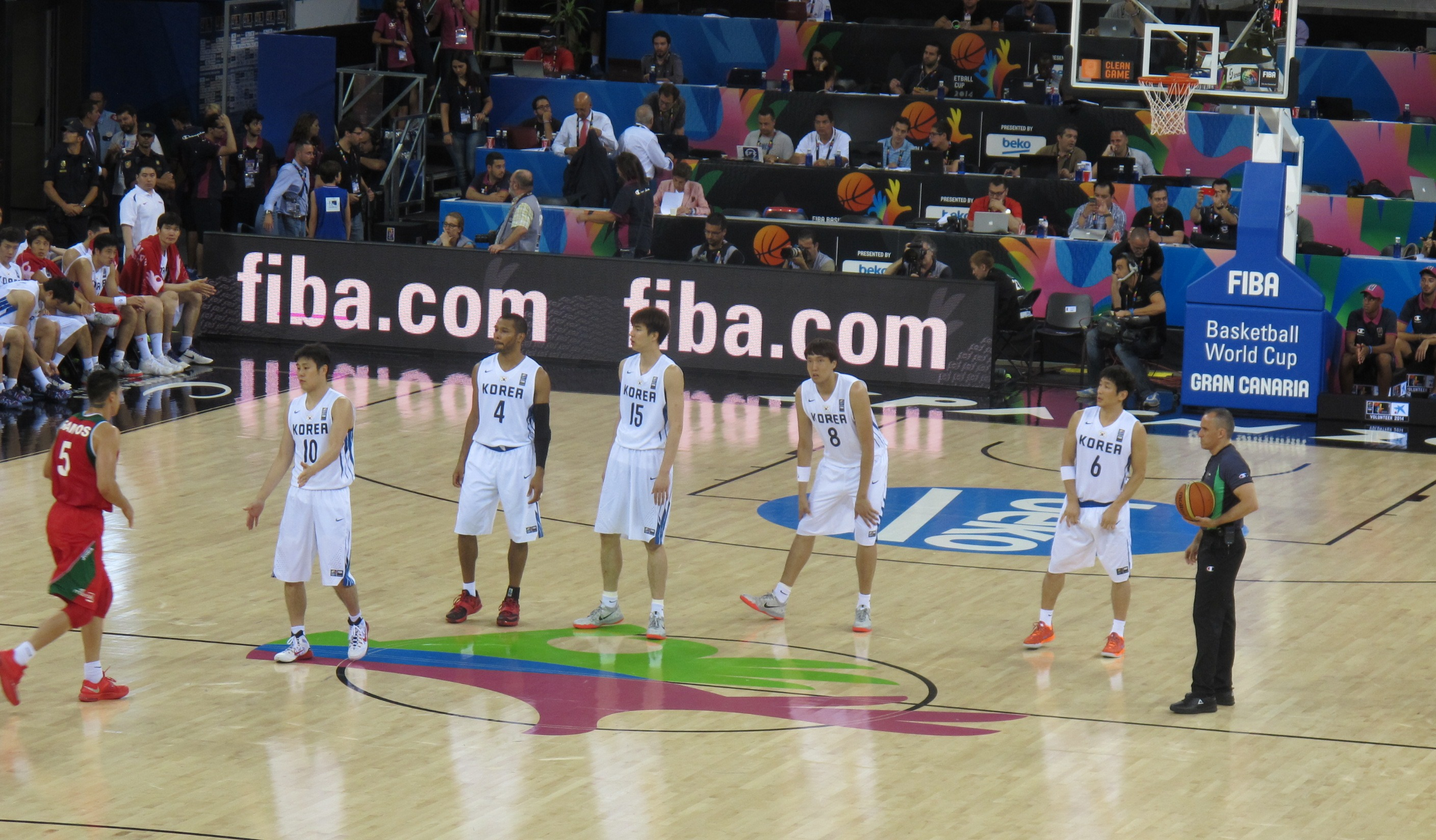
South Korea against Mexico

Venue: Gran Canaria Arena, Las Palmas

Pos	Team	Pld	W	L	PF	PA	PD	Pts	Qualification
1	Lithuania	5	4	1	383	331	+52	9 (Note: Head-to-head record: Lithuania 1–0 Slovenia)	Round of 16
2	Slovenia	5	4	1	425	374	+51	9	Round of 16
3	Australia	5	3	2	404	373	+31	8	Round of 16
4	Mexico	5	2	3	370	372	−2	7 (Note: Head-to-head record: Mexico 1–0 Angola)	Round of 16
5	Angola	5	2	3	375	399	−24	7	
6	South Korea	5	0	5	316	424	−108	5	

Source: FIBA archive
Rules for classification: 1) points; 2) head-to-head points; 3) head-to-head goal average; 4) head-to-head number of points scored.
Notes:

30 August 2014
Angola	80–69	South Korea
Australia	80–90	Slovenia
Mexico	74–87	Lithuania
31 August 2014
South Korea	55–89	Australia
Slovenia	89–68	Mexico
Lithuania	75–62	Angola
2 September 2014
Angola	55–79	Mexico
Australia	82–75	Lithuania
South Korea	72–89	Slovenia
3 September 2014
Mexico	62–70	Australia
Slovenia	93–87	Angola
Lithuania	79–49	South Korea
4 September 2014
Australia	83–91	Angola
South Korea	71–87	Mexico
Lithuania	67–64	Slovenia

== Final round ==
Round of 16
6 September – Madrid
Spain	89
Senegal	56
6 September – Madrid
Croatia	64
France	69
7 September – Madrid
Greece	72
Serbia	90
7 September – Madrid
Brazil	85
Argentina	65
6 September – Barcelona
United States	86
Mexico	63
6 September – Barcelona
Slovenia	71
Dominican Republic	61
7 September – Barcelona
Lithuania	76
New Zealand	71
7 September – Barcelona
Turkey	65
Australia	64

Quarter-finals
10 September – Madrid
Spain	52
France	65
10 September – Madrid
Serbia	84
Brazil	56
9 September – Barcelona
United States	119
Slovenia	76
9 September – Barcelona
Lithuania	73
Turkey	61

Semi-finals
12 September – Madrid
France	85
Serbia	90
11 September – Barcelona
United States	96
Lithuania	68

Final
14 September – Madrid
Serbia	92
United States	129
Third place
13 September – Madrid
France	95
Lithuania	93

=== Round of 16 ===
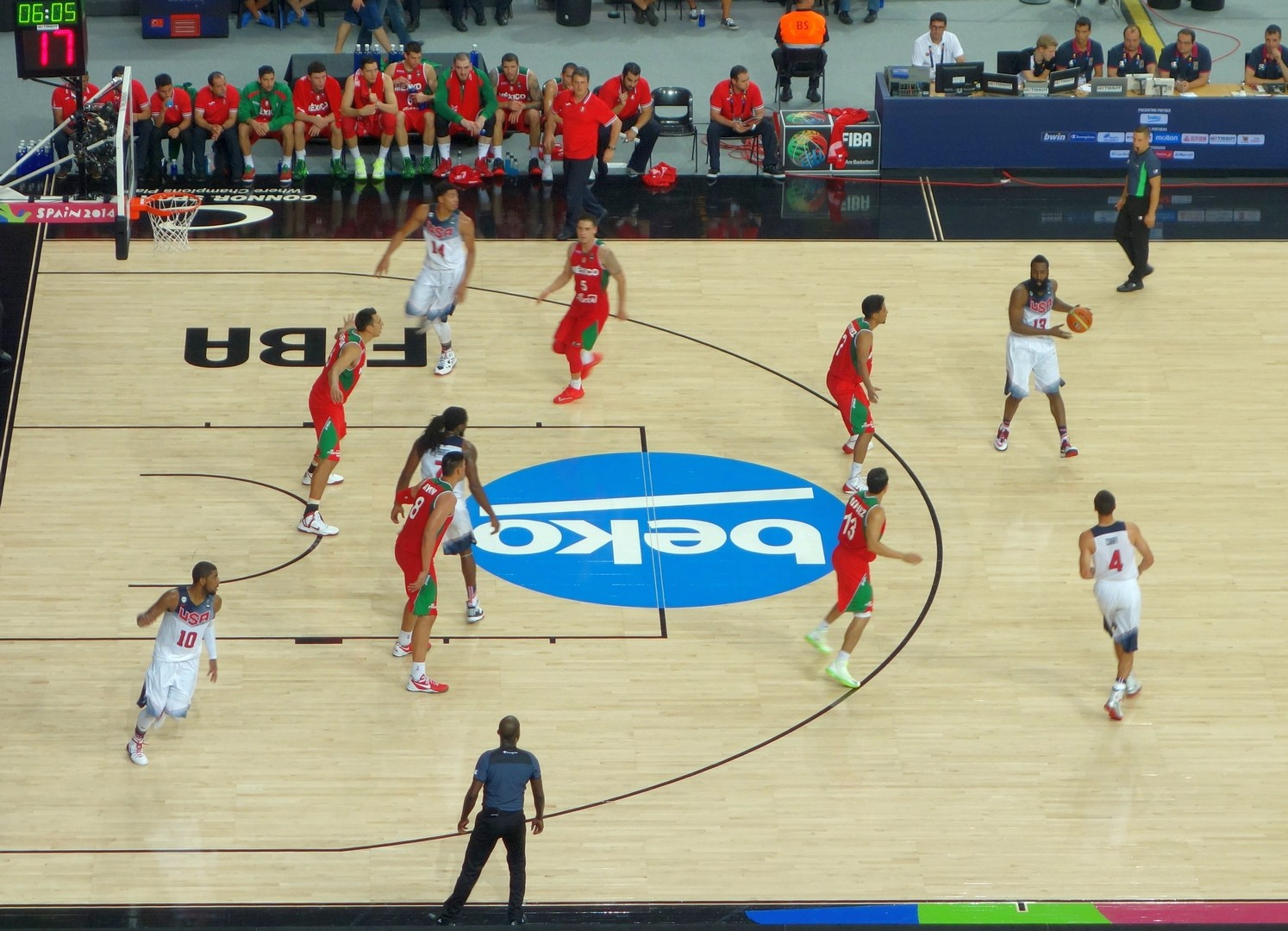
USA against Mexico

6 September 2014
16:00

Boxscore

United States	86–63	Mexico
Scoring by quarter: 23–13, 19–14, 24–11, 20–25
Pts: Curry 20; Rebs: Faried 8 Asts: Curry, Rose 4		Pts: Ayón 25; Rebs: Ayón 8 Asts: Gutiérrez 3

Palau Sant Jordi, Barcelona
Attendance: 14,200
Referees: Eddie Viator (FRA), Carlos Julio (ANG), Oļegs Latiševs (LAT)

6 September 2014
18:00

Boxscore

France	69–64	Croatia
Scoring by quarter: 7–15, 16–7, 23–12, 23–30
Pts: Batum 14; Rebs: Gelabale 6 Asts: Diaw 5		Pts: Bogdanović 27; Rebs: Šarić 7 Asts: Lafayette 6

Palacio de Deportes de la Comunidad de Madrid, Madrid
Attendance: 12,600
Referees: Anthony Jordan (USA), José Reyes (MEX), Borys Ryzhyk (UKR)

6 September 2014
20:00

Boxscore

Dominican Republic	61–71	Slovenia
Scoring by quarter: 15–15, 13–23, 20–16, 13–17
Pts: Feldeine 18; Rebs: Martínez 11; Asts: Feldeine 3		Pts: Z. Dragić 18; Rebs: Slokar 6 Asts: G. Dragić 6

Palau Sant Jordi, Barcelona
Attendance: 10,324
Referees: Christos Christodoulou (GRE), Alejandro Chiti (ARG), Juan González (ESP)

6 September 2014
22:00

Boxscore

Spain	89–56	Senegal
Scoring by quarter: 23–17, 18–11, 21–15, 27–13
Pts: P. Gasol 17; Rebs: M. Gasol, Ibaka 6 Asts: Rubio 6		Pts: Faye, Badji 12; Rebs: three players 7 Asts: D'Almeida 4

Palacio de Deportes de la Comunidad de Madrid, Madrid
Attendance: 13,400
Referees: Sreten Radović (CRO), Matej Boltauzer (SLO), Robert Lottermoser (GER)

7 September 2014
16:00

Boxscore

New Zealand	71–76	Lithuania
Scoring by quarter: 9–23, 17–13, 24–22, 21–18
Pts: C. Webster 26; Rebs: Vukona 10; Asts: Penney 3		Pts: Valančiūnas 22; Rebs: Valančiūnas 13; Asts: Seibutis 5

Palau Sant Jordi, Barcelona
Attendance: 7,783
Referees: Ilija Belošević (SRB), Alejandro Chiti (ARG), Ferdinand Pascual (PHI)

7 September 2014
18:00

Boxscore

Serbia	90–72	Greece
Scoring by quarter: 23–20, 23–22, 18–13, 26–17
Pts: Bogdanović 21; Rebs: Bjelica 10; Asts: Teodosić 5		Pts: Calathes 14; Rebs: Kaimakoglou 6 Asts: Printezis 5

Palacio de Deportes de la Comunidad de Madrid, Madrid
Attendance: 13,100
Referees: Michael Aylen (AUS), Robert Lottermoser (GER), Stephen Seibel (CAN)

7 September 2014
20:00

Boxscore

Turkey	65–64	Australia
Scoring by quarter: 15–18, 19–17, 12–15, 19–14
Pts: Güler, Preldžić 16; Rebs: Preldžić 7 Asts: Tunçeri 3		Pts: Baynes 15; Rebs: Baynes 7 Asts: Dellavedova 5

Palau Sant Jordi, Barcelona
Attendance: 6,339
Referees: Cristiano Maranho (BRA), Steven Anderson (USA), Oļegs Latiševs (LAT)

7 September 2014
22:00

Boxscore

Brazil	85–65	Argentina
Scoring by quarter: 13–21, 20–15, 24–13, 28–16
Pts: Neto 21; Rebs: Varejão 9 Asts: Varejão, Nenê 4		Pts: Prigioni 18; Rebs: Scola 7 Asts: Scola, Prigioni 3

Palacio de Deportes de la Comunidad de Madrid, Madrid
Attendance: 13,450
Referees: Luigi Lamonica (ITA), Sreten Radović (CRO), Jorge Vázquez (PUR)

=== Quarterfinals ===
9 September 2014
17:00

Boxscore

Lithuania	73–61	Turkey
Scoring by quarter: 13–18, 20–10, 14–16, 26–17
Pts: Seibutis 19; Rebs: Valančiūnas 13; Asts: Seibutis, Pocius 3		Pts: Gönlüm 13; Rebs: Aşık 10; Asts: Preldžić 5

Palau Sant Jordi, Barcelona
Attendance: 9,752
Referees: Juan González (ESP), Stephen Seibel (CAN), Eddie Viator (FRA)

9 September 2014
21:00

Boxscore

Slovenia	76–119	United States
Scoring by quarter: 22–29, 20–20, 22–37, 12–33
Pts: G. Dragić 13; Rebs: Balažič, Lorbek 6 Asts: G. Dragić 4		Pts: Thompson 20; Rebs: Davis 11; Asts: Rose 5

Palau Sant Jordi, Barcelona
Attendance: 13,674
Referees: Cristiano Maranho (BRA), Robert Lottermoser (GER), Ferdinand Pascual (PHI)

10 September 2014
18:00

Boxscore

Serbia	84–56	Brazil
Scoring by quarter: 21–17, 16–15, 29–12, 18–12
Pts: Teodosić 23; Rebs: Bjelica 8 Asts: Bjelica 5		Pts: Varejão 12; Rebs: Varejão 9 Asts: Huertas 9

Palacio de Deportes de la Comunidad de Madrid, Madrid
Attendance: 12,550
Referees: Steven Anderson (USA), José Reyes (MEX), Borys Ryzhyk (UKR)

10 September 2014
22:00

Boxscore

France	65–52	Spain
Scoring by quarter: 15–15, 20–13, 7–15, 23–9
Pts: Diaw 15; Rebs: Gobert 13; Asts: Heurtel, Diot 4		Pts: P. Gasol 17; Rebs: P. Gasol 8 Asts: Fernández 3

Palacio de Deportes de la Comunidad de Madrid, Madrid
Attendance: 13,673
Referees: Luigi Lamonica (ITA), Michael Aylen (AUS), Oļegs Latiševs (LAT)

=== Semifinals ===
11 September 2014
21:00

Boxscore

United States	96–68	Lithuania
Scoring by quarter: 21–16, 22–19, 33–14, 20–19
Pts: Irving 18; Rebs: Gay 7 Asts: Irving 4		Pts: Valančiūnas, Kuzminskas 15; Rebs: Kuzminskas 9 Asts: Juškevičius, Seibutis 2

Palau Sant Jordi, Barcelona
Attendance: 15,070
Referees: José Reyes (MEX), Matej Boltauzer (SLO), Sreten Radović (CRO)

12 September 2014
22:00

Boxscore

France	85–90	Serbia
Scoring by quarter: 15–21, 17–25, 14–15, 39–29
Pts: Batum 35; Rebs: Diaw 10; Asts: Heurtel 6		Pts: Teodosić 24; Rebs: Bjelica 7 Asts: Bjelica, Marković 5

Palacio de Deportes de la Comunidad de Madrid, Madrid
Attendance: 13,470
Referees: Cristiano Maranho (BRA), Alejandro Chiti (ARG), Christos Christodoulou (GRE)

=== Third place playoff ===
13 September 2014
18:00

Boxscore

Lithuania	93–95	France
Scoring by quarter: 19–22, 23–21, 29–21, 22–31
Pts: Valančiūnas 25; Rebs: Valančiūnas 9 Asts: Seibutis 4		Pts: Batum 27; Rebs: Lauvergne 9 Asts: Diaw 4

Palacio de Deportes de la Comunidad de Madrid, Madrid
Attendance: 11,800
Referees: Steven Anderson (USA), Ilija Belošević (SRB), Juan González (ESP)

=== Final ===
14 September 2014
21:00

Boxscore

United States	129–92	Serbia
Scoring by quarter: 35–21, 32–20, 38–26, 24–25
Pts: Irving 26; Rebs: Cousins 9 Asts: Rose 6		Pts: Bjelica, Kalinić 18; Rebs: Marković 6 Asts: Teodosić 7

Palacio de Deportes de la Comunidad de Madrid, Madrid
Attendance: 13,673
Referees: Stephen Seibel (CAN), Borys Ryzhyk (UKR), Eddie Viator (FRA)

== Statistics ==
=== Player tournament averages ===
Points
#	Player	Pld	Pts	PPG
1	(Puerto Rico) J. J. Barea	5	110	22.0
2	(Philippines) Andray Blatche	5	106	21.2
2	(Croatia) Bojan Bogdanović	6	127	21.2
3	(Spain) Pau Gasol	7	140	20.0
4	(Argentina) Luis Scola	6	117	19.5
5	(Iran) Hamed Haddadi	5	94	18.8
6	(Angola) Yanick Moreira	5	89	17.8
7	(Mexico) Gustavo Ayón	5	88	17.6
7	(Dominican Republic) Francisco García	5	88	17.6
8	(Australia) Aron Baynes	5	84	16.8

Rebounds
#	Player	Pld	Rebs	RPG
1	(Philippines) Andray Blatche	5	69	13.8
2	(Iran) Hamed Haddadi	5	57	11.4
3	(Senegal) Gorgui Dieng	6	64	10.7
4	(Greece) Ioannis Bourousis	6	55	9.2
5	(Argentina) Luis Scola	6	51	8.5
6	(Lithuania) Jonas Valančiūnas	9	76	8.4
7	(Turkey) Ömer Aşık	7	59	8.4
8	(Angola) Yanick Moreira	5	41	8.2
9	(Brazil) Anderson Varejão	7	56	8.0
10	(United States) Kenneth Faried	9	70	7.8

Assists
#	Player	Pld	Asts	APG
1	(Finland) Petteri Koponen	5	29	5.8
2	(Senegal) Xane D'Almeida	6	32	5.3
3	(Spain) Ricky Rubio	7	36	5.1
4	(Ukraine) Eugene Jeter	5	25	5.0
5	(Serbia) Miloš Teodosić	9	40	4.4
6	(Iran) Samad Nikkhah Bahrami	5	22	4.4
7	(Argentina) Facundo Campazzo	6	26	4.3
7	(Greece) Nikos Zisis	6	26	4.3
9	(Slovenia) Goran Dragić	7	30	4.3
10	(Argentina) Pablo Prigioni	6	25	4.2

Blocks
#	Player	Pld	Blks	BPG
1	(South Korea) Lee Jong-hyun	5	13	2.6
2	(Spain) Pau Gasol	7	16	2.3
3	(United States) Anthony Davis	9	19	2.1
4	(South Korea) Kim Jong-kyu	5	10	2.0
5	(Senegal) Hamady N'Diaye	6	11	1.8
6	(Turkey) Ömer Aşık	7	11	1.6
7	(Senegal) Gorgui Dieng	6	9	1.5
7	(Dominican Republic) Eloy Vargas	6	9	1.5
9	(Spain) Marc Gasol	7	10	1.4
10	(Spain) Serge Ibaka	6	8	1.3

Steals
#	Player	Pld	Stls	SPG
1	(Spain) Ricky Rubio	7	25	3.6
2	(Iran) Mehdi Kamrani	5	13	2.6
3	(United States) James Harden	9	19	2.1
4	(Puerto Rico) Renaldo Balkman	5	10	2.0
5	(United States) Kyrie Irving	9	17	1.9
6	(Senegal) Gorgui Dieng	6	11	1.8
6	(Argentina) Pablo Prigioni	6	11	1.8
8	(Australia) Joe Ingles	5	9	1.8
9	(Senegal) Maleye N'Doye	6	10	1.7
9	(Croatia) Dario Šarić	6	10	1.7

Minutes
#	Player	Pld	Mins	MPG
1	(Senegal) Gorgui Dieng	6	218	36.3
2	(Philippines) Andray Blatche	5	169	33.8
3	(Croatia) Bojan Bogdanović	6	201	33.5
4	(Argentina) Luis Scola	6	195	32.5
5	(Iran) Samad Nikkhah Bahrami	5	162	32.4
6	(Mexico) Gustavo Ayón	5	161	32.2
7	(Philippines) Gabe Norwood	5	159	31.8
8	(Angola) Armando Costa	5	157	31.4
8	(Finland) Petteri Koponen	5	157	31.4
10	(Ukraine) Eugene Jeter	5	156	31.2

Free throws
#	Player	FTA	FTM	FT%
1	(Puerto Rico) David Huertas	15	14	93.3
2	(Puerto Rico) J.J. Barea	32	28	87.5
3	(Philippines) Jimmy Alapag	15	13	86.7
4	(Slovenia) Domen Lorbek	21	18	85.7
5	(Finland) Teemu Rannikko	17	14	82.4
6	(Spain) Marc Gasol	22	18	81.8
7	(Serbia) Nemanja Bjelica	38	31	81.6
8	(United States) James Harden	42	34	81.0
8	(Lithuania) Jonas Valančiūnas	42	32	81.0
10	(Philippines) Andray Blatche	30	24	80.0
10	(Ukraine) Eugene Jeter	25	20	80.0

Field goal shooting
#	Player	FGA	FGM	FG%
1	(Spain) Pau Gasol	85	54	63.5
2	(United States) Kenneth Faried	79	50	63.3
3	(Dominican Republic) Francisco García	54	33	61.1
4	(Mexico) Gustavo Ayón	59	36	61.0
5	(Puerto Rico) Renaldo Balkman	40	24	60.0
6	(Angola) Yanick Moreira	64	38	59.4
7	(United States) Kyrie Irving	80	45	56.3
8	(Slovenia) Goran Dragić	83	46	55.4
9	(Serbia) Miloš Teodosić	75	41	55.4
10	(United States) Anthony Davis	82	45	54.9
10	(Serbia) Miroslav Raduljica	82	45	54.9

Double-doubles
#	Player	Pld	DblDbl	DD%
1	(Philippines) Andray Blatche	5	5	100
2	(Iran) Hamed Haddadi	5	3	60.0
3	(Greece) Ioannis Bourousis	6	3	50.0
3	(Senegal) Gorgui Dieng	6	3	50.0
5	(Lithuania) Jonas Valančiūnas	9	3	33.3
6	(Angola) Yanick Moreira	5	2	40.0
7	(Turkey) Ömer Aşık	6	2	33.3
8	(United States) Kenneth Faried	9	2	22.2
8	(Serbia) Nemanja Bjelica	9	2	22.2
10	(Mexico) Gustavo Ayon	5	1	20.0
10	(Australia) Aron Baynes	5	1	20.0

Efficiency
#	Player	Pld	MPG	PPG	RPG	Eff	EffPG
1	(Philippines) Andray Blatche	5	33.8	24.2	13.8	112	22.4
2	(Spain) Pau Gasol	7	26.5	20.0	5.9	152	21.7
3	(Iran) Hamed Haddadi	5	29.4	18.8	11.4	101	20.2
3	(Angola) Yanick Moreira	5	20.4	17.8	8.2	101	20.2
5	(Lithuania) Jonas Valančiūnas	9	24.8	14.4	8.4	178	19.8
6	(Senegal) Gorgui Dieng	6	36.3	16.0	10.7	117	19.5
7	(Mexico) Gustavo Ayón	5	32.2	17.6	7.6	96	19.2
7	(Argentina) Luis Scola	6	32.4	19.5	8.5	115	19.2
9	(Greece) Ioannis Bourousis	6	26.5	11.5	9.2	114	19.0
10	(Dominican Republic) Francisco García	5	28.2	17.6	3.2	91	18.2

=== Team tournament averages ===
Offensive points
#	Team	Pld	Pts	PPG
1	United States	9	941	104.6
2	Spain	7	581	83.0
3	Serbia	9	743	82.6
4	Slovenia	7	572	81.7
5	Greece	6	486	81.0

Defensive points
#	Team	Pld	Pts	PPG
1	Spain	7	435	62.2
2	Brazil	7	482	68.9
3	United States	9	644	71.6
4	Lithuania	9	654	72.7
5	Turkey	7	509	72.7

Rebounds
#	Team	Pld	Rebs	RPG
1	United States	9	403	44.8
2	Angola	5	202	40.4
3	Dominican Republic	6	238	39.7
3	New Zealand	6	238	39.7
5	Philippines	5	195	39.0

Assists
#	Team	Pld	Asts	APG
1	United States	9	184	20.4
2	Spain	7	126	18.0
3	Greece	6	106	17.7
4	Australia	6	102	17.0
5	Serbia	9	151	16.8

Blocks
#	Team	Pld	Blks	BPG
1	South Korea	5	33	6.6
2	Spain	7	41	5.9
3	United States	9	50	5.6
4	Senegal	6	28	4.7
5	Greece	6	25	4.2

Steals
#	Team	Pld	Stls	SPG
1	United States	9	109	12.1
2	Iran	5	48	9.6
3	Senegal	6	53	8.8
4	Spain	7	60	8.6
5	Angola	5	40	8.0

Minutes
#	Team	Pld	Mins	MPG
1	Philippines	5	1051	210.2
2	Finland	5	1025	205.0
3	Senegal	6	1226	204.3
4	Croatia	6	1225	204.2
5	Turkey	7	1428	204.0

Free throws
#	Team	Pld	FTM/A	FT%
1	Philippines	5	74/93	79.6
2	Lithuania	9	144/187	77.0
3	Spain	7	115/151	76.2
4	Greece	6	87/115	75.7
5	Puerto Rico	5	84/112	75.0

Field goal
#	Team	Pld	FGM/A	FG%
1	United States	9	361/690	52.3
2	Serbia	9	270/542	49.8
3	Brazil	7	216/438	49.3
4	France	9	254/519	48.9
5	Slovenia	7	214/438	48.9

Tournament game highs
Statistic	Player	Total	Opponent (Date)	Team	Total	Opponent (Date)
Points	(Angola) Yanick Moreira	38	Australia (4 Sep)	United States	129	Serbia (14 Sep)
Offensive; Rebounds	(Angola) Yanick Moreira	10	Australia (4 Sep)	Angola; United States	24; 24	Mexico (2 Sep); Slovenia (9 Sep)
Defensive; Rebounds	(Philippines) Andray Blatche	14	Greece (31 Aug)	Brazil; France	36; 36	Egypt (4 Sep); Egypt (1 Sep)
Rebounds	(Turkey) Ömer Aşık	20	Ukraine (2 Sep)	United States	54	Slovenia (9 Sep)
Assists	(Senegal) Xane D'Almeida (Brazil) Raulzinho Neto (Argentina) Pablo Prigioni (Greece) Nikos Zisis	14 (OT); 10; 10; 10	Philippines (4 Sep); Egypt (4 Sep); Puerto Rico (30 Aug); Croatia (3 Sep)	Brazil	35	Egypt (4 Sep)
Steals	(Spain) Ricky Rubio	7	Serbia (4 Sep)	United States	18	Finland (30 Aug)
Blocks	(United States) Anthony Davis	5	Dominican Republic (3 Sep)	Spain	13	Senegal (6 Sep)

== Final standings ==
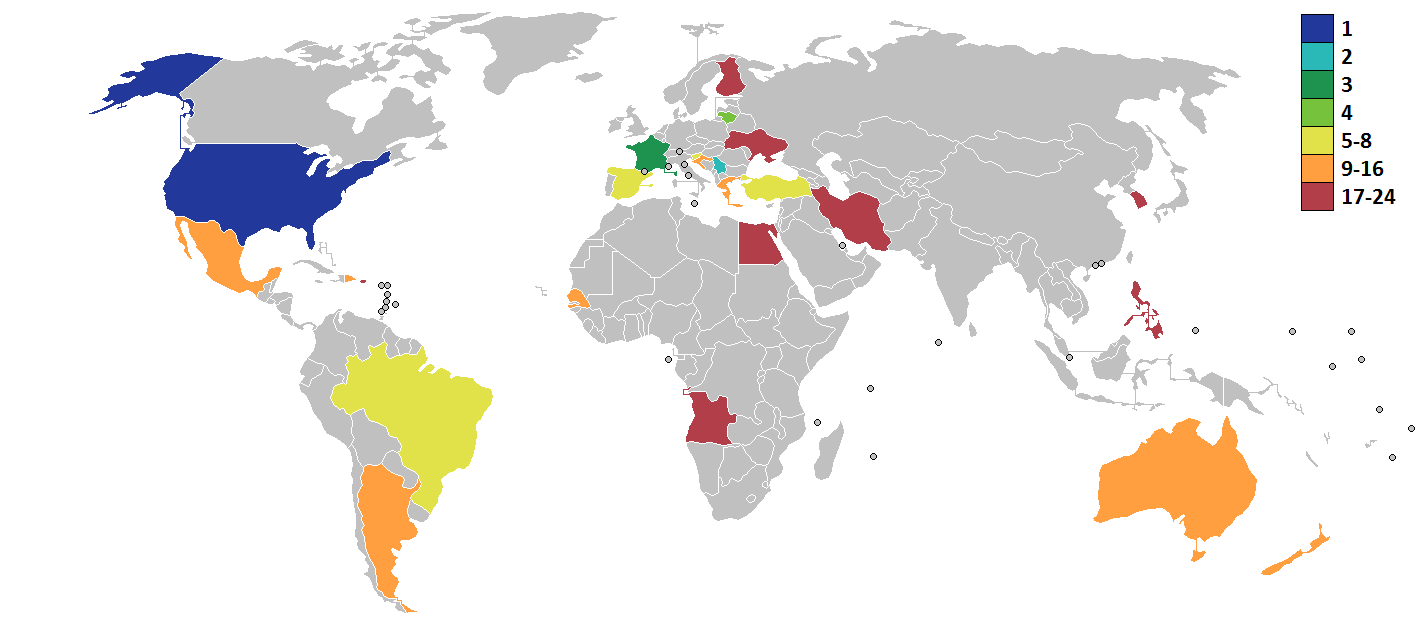
Final rankings of teams.

Method of breaking ties:

- Ranked 17th–24th:
  1. Place in preliminary round group (5th placed teams ranked 17th–20th; 6th placed teams ranked 21st–24th)
  2. Win–loss record in preliminary round group
  3. Goal average in preliminary round group
- Ranked 5th–16th:
  1. Furthest round eliminated
  2. Win–loss record in preliminary round group
  3. Place in preliminary round group
  4. Goal average in preliminary round group
- Ranked 1st–4th:
  1. Result of final and third-place playoff

#	Team	Pld	W	L	PF	PA	PD	Preliminary round			FIBA World Ranking		
#	Team	Pld	W	L	PF	PA	PD	Grp	W–L	GA	Old	New	+/−
1st place, gold medalist(s)	United States	9	9	0	941	644	+297	C	—N/a		1	1	0
2nd place, silver medalist(s)	Serbia	9	5	4	743	720	+23	A	—N/a		11	7	+4
3rd place, bronze medalist(s)	France	9	6	3	690	656	+34	A	—N/a		8	5	+3
4th	Lithuania	9	6	3	693	654	+39	D	—N/a		4	4	0
5th	Spain	7	6	1	581	435	+146	A	5–0	1.4013	2	2	0
6th	Brazil	7	5	2	557	482	+75	A	4–1	1.2492	10	9	+1
7th	Slovenia	7	5	2	572	554	+18	D	4–1	1.1364	13	13	0
8th	Turkey	7	4	3	491	509	−18	C	3–2	0.9812	7	8	−1
9th	Greece	6	5	1	486	439	+47	B	5–0	1.1862	5	10	−5
10th	Croatia	6	3	3	478	467	+11	B	3–2	1.0402	16	12	+4
11th	Argentina	6	3	3	485	456	+29	B	3–2	1.1321	3	3	0
12th	Australia	6	3	3	468	438	+30	D	3–2	1.0831	9	11	−2
13th	Dominican Republic	6	2	4	408	457	−49	C	2–3	0.8990	26	20	+6
14th	Mexico	6	2	4	433	458	−25	D	2–3	0.9946	24	19	+5
15th	New Zealand	6	2	4	418	452	−34	C	2–3	0.9229	19	21	−2
16th	Senegal	6	2	4	404	488	−84	B	2–3	0.8722	41	30	+11
17th	Angola	5	2	3	375	399	−24	D	2–3	0.9398	15	16	−1
18th	Ukraine	5	2	3	344	369	−25	C	2–3	0.9322	45	40	+5
19th	Puerto Rico	5	1	4	388	446	−58	B	1–4	0.8700	17	15	+2
20th	Iran	5	1	4	344	406	−62	A	1–4	0.8473	20	17	+3
21st	Philippines	5	1	4	383	404	−21	B	1–4	0.9480	34	31	+3
22nd	Finland	5	1	4	342	408	−66	C	1–4	0.8382	39	35	+4
23rd	South Korea	5	0	5	316	424	−108	D	0–5	0.7453	31	27	+4
24th	Egypt	5	0	5	311	486	−175	A	0–5	0.6399	46	41	+5

Qualified for the 2016 Summer Olympics

== Awards ==
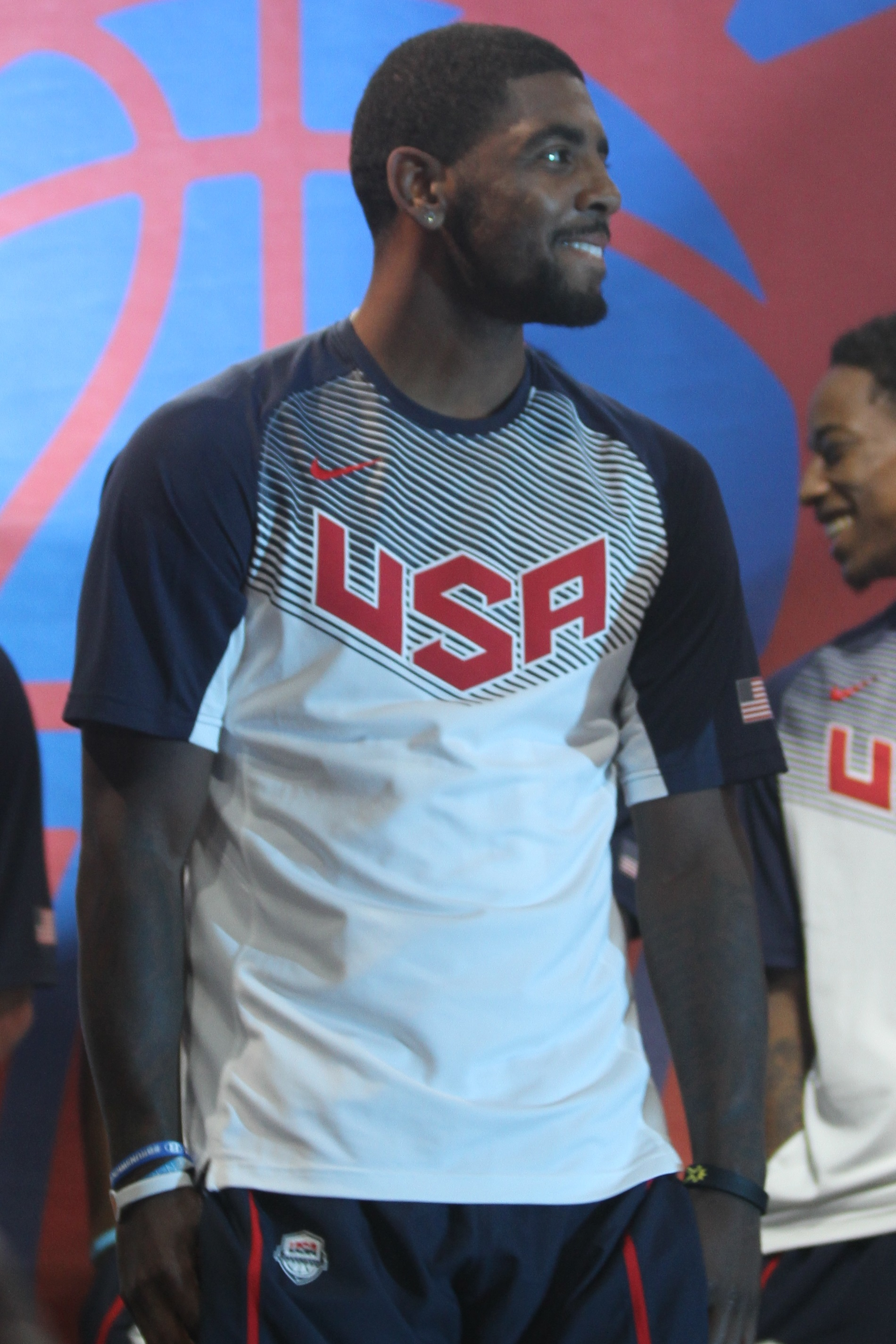
Kyrie Irving was named MVP

2014 FIBA Basketball World Cup champion

United States
5th title

Most Valuable Player
(United States) Kyrie Irving

=== All-Tournament Team ===
- (United States) Kyrie Irving – MVP
- (Serbia) Miloš Teodosić
- (France) Nicolas Batum
- (United States) Kenneth Faried
- (Spain) Pau Gasol

=== Special awards ===
- Philippines – MVF Best Country (on Fan support throughout the tournament)

== Controversies ==
=== Australia's alleged tanking ===
At their final group matches between Australia and Angola, Australia rested their key players towards the end of the game, allowing for Angola to win 91–83, after the Boomers led at the half by double digits. Australia fell to third place, thereby allowing them to face the United States at the semifinals instead of the quarterfinals if they finished second. This so-called "tanking" was blasted by Goran Dragić, whose Slovenian team were defeated by Lithuania in the final group match, dropping them to second place, causing them to face the Americans instead in the quarterfinals if they reach that far. Dragic implored on FIBA "to do something about" it.

Right after Australia's elimination by Turkey in the first round, FIBA announced that the Boomers were under investigation for tanking. Australia coach Andrej Lemanis rejected the accusation that they tanked, saying he rested his players for the next stage due to the heavy tournament schedule, adding that: "We always, as Australians, compete the right way".

On 26 November 2014, Australia was cleared of tanking by FIBA.

== Marketing ==
=== Road show and trophy tour ===
A tour of the Naismith Trophy was held to promote the event. The trophy was on display at the 2014 NBA All-Star Game in New Orleans in February 2014, then the tour visited several countries in Latin America, Europe and the Philippines from April to mid-July. It also visited South Africa during the finals of the South African Premier Basketball League in August.

Prior to this, FIBA and the Spanish Basketball Federation held a road show that ran from 2012 to 2014 visiting key Spanish cities, with some of the final stops being the host cities, and at Ljubljana, Slovenia during FIBA EuroBasket 2013.

=== Ball ===
On 30 January, FIBA revealed the official ball that would be used in the World Cup. Designed by Molten, it "will be the first time ever a custom designed basketball has been developed exclusively for an individual event".

=== Mascots ===
Olé and Hop (official mascots)

On 31 January, FIBA revealed the mascots of the World Cup: Olé and Hop. Olé and Hop's name came from the word "alley-oop"; they are directly inspired from the 2014 World Cup logo, and will have a tour of host cities leading up to the championship.

=== Theme song ===
"Sube la Copa" by Huecco was named the official theme song of the 2014 FIBA Basketball World Cup. The song, starting from 27 August, can be downloaded on iTunes, Spotify and Deezer, with all of the proceeds going to the FEB's Casa Espana, Huecco's Fundacion Dame Vida, and FIBA's International Basketball Foundation.

== Referees ==
The following referees were selected for the tournament.

- (Angola) Carlos Julio
- (Argentina) Alejandro Chiti
- (Australia) Michael Aylen
- (Australia) Vaughan Mayberry
- (Brazil) Marcos Benito
- (Brazil) Cristiano Maranho
- (Cameroon) Arnaud Kom Njilo
- (Canada) Stephen Seibel
- (Canada) Michael Weiland
- (Croatia) Sreten Radović
- (Dominican Republic) Reynaldo Mercedes
- (France) Joseph Bissang
- (France) Eddie Viator
- (Germany) Robert Lottermoser
- (Greece) Christos Christodoulou
- (Greece) Elias Koromilas
- (Italy) Guerrino Cerebuch
- (Italy) Luigi Lamonica
- (Japan) Yuji Hirahara
- (Kazakhstan) Yevgeniy Mikheyev
- (Kuwait) Mohammad Al-Amiri
- (Latvia) Oļegs Latiševs
- (Mexico) José Reyes
- (Nigeria) Kingsley Ojeaburu
- (Philippines) Ferdinand Pascual
- (Portugal) Fernando Rocha
- (Puerto Rico) Jorge Vázquez
- (Puerto Rico) Luis Vázquez
- (Serbia) Ilija Belošević
- (Serbia) Milivoje Jovčić
- (Slovenia) Matej Boltauzer
- (Spain) Juan Arteaga
- (Spain) Juan González
- (Spain) Benjamin Jiménez
- (Spain) Miguel Pérez
- (Turkey) Rüştü Nuran
- (Ukraine) Borys Ryzhyk
- (United States) Steven Anderson
- (United States) Anthony Jordan
- (Uruguay) Alejandro Sánchez

== See also ==
- 2014 FIBA World Championship for Women
