= 2014 FIBA Basketball World Cup Group D =

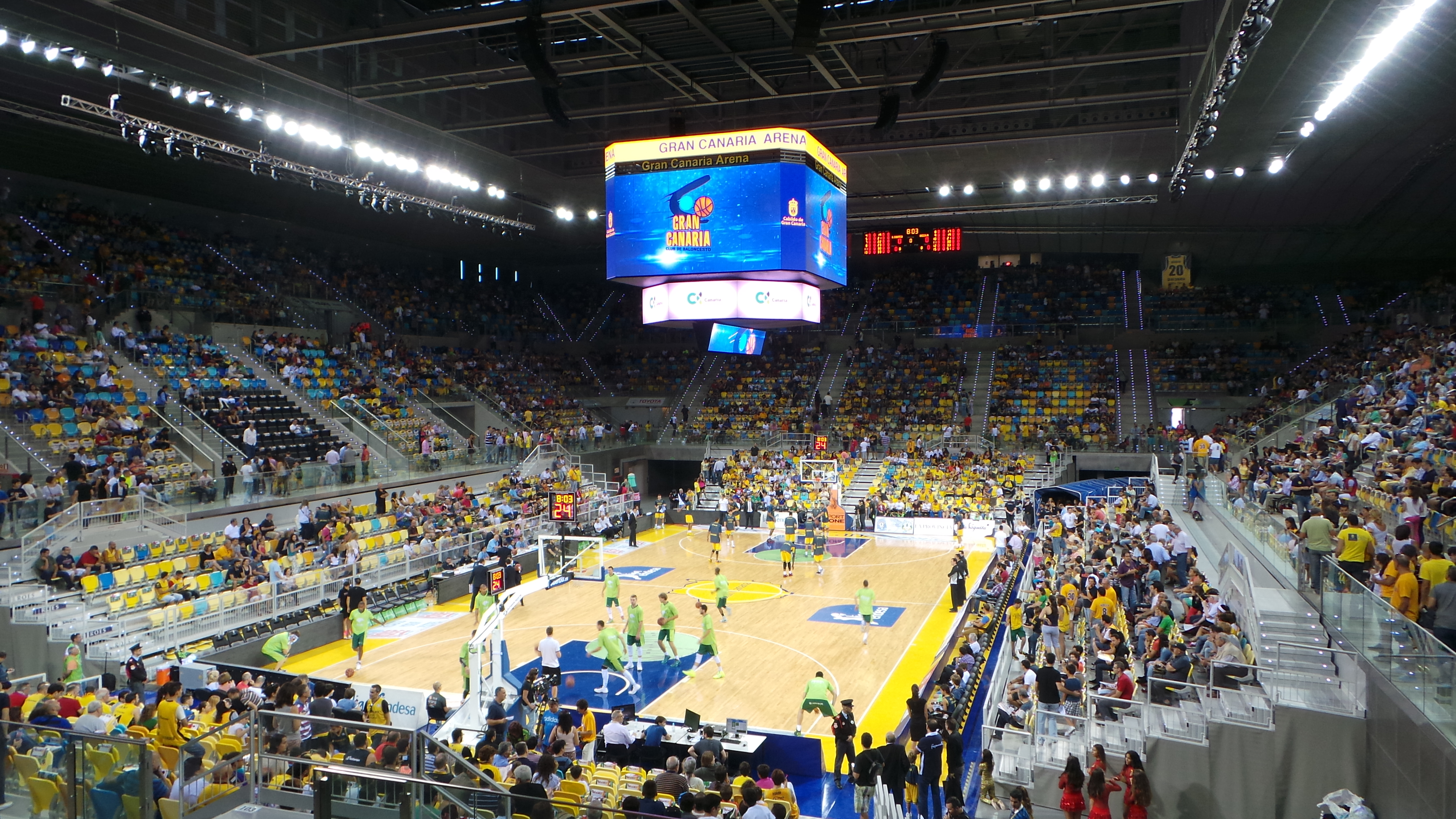
Gran Canaria Arena, host of Group D games.

Group D of the 2014 FIBA Basketball World Cup was the group stage of the 2014 FIBA Basketball World Cup for Lithuania, Angola, South Korea, Slovenia, Mexico and Australia. Each team played each other once, for a total of five games per team, with all of the games played at Gran Canaria Arena, Las Palmas, located in the island of Gran Canaria, Canary Islands. After all of the games were played, the four teams with the best records qualified for the final round.

== Teams ==
Team	Qualification		Appearance			Best performance	FIBA World Ranking
Team	As	Date	Last	Total	Streak	Best performance	FIBA World Ranking
Lithuania	FIBA EuroBasket 2013 runner-up	September 19, 2013	2010	4	3	3rd place (2010) / Third place playoff	4
Angola	2013 FIBA Africa Championship winner	August 30, 2013	2010	7	4	9th place (2006) / Round of 16	15
South Korea	2013 FIBA Asia Championship 3rd place	August 11, 2013	1998	7	1	11th place (1970) / Preliminary round	31
Slovenia	FIBA EuroBasket 2013 5th place	September 19, 2013	2010	3	3	8th place (2010) / Quarterfinals	13
Mexico	2013 FIBA Americas Championship winner	September 8, 2013	1974	5	1	8th place (1967) / Preliminary round	24
Australia	2013 FIBA Oceania Championship winner	August 18, 2013	2010	11	3	5th place (1982, 1994) / Final round (1982), Second round (1994)	9

== Standings ==
Pos	Team	Pld	W	L	PF	PA	PD	Pts	Qualification
1	Lithuania	5	4	1	383	331	+52	9 (Note: Head-to-head record: Lithuania 1–0 Slovenia)	Round of 16
2	Slovenia	5	4	1	425	374	+51	9	Round of 16
3	Australia	5	3	2	404	373	+31	8	Round of 16
4	Mexico	5	2	3	370	372	−2	7 (Note: Head-to-head record: Mexico 1–0 Angola)	Round of 16
5	Angola	5	2	3	375	399	−24	7	
6	South Korea	5	0	5	316	424	−108	5	

Source: FIBA archive
Rules for classification: 1) points; 2) head-to-head points; 3) head-to-head goal average; 4) head-to-head number of points scored.
Notes:

All times are local UTC+1.

== 30 August ==
=== Angola vs. Korea ===
This was the third meeting between Angola and South Korea in the World Cup. The teams have split their two previous match-ups with Korea winning in 1994 and Angola winning in the 1990 FIBA World Championship. The last competitive game between the two was an Angola win at the 1996 Olympics.

30 August 2014
12:30

Boxscore

Angola	80–69	South Korea
Scoring by quarter: 16–6, 20–12, 16–30, 28–21
Pts: Cipriano, Moreira 16; Rebs: Moreira 10; Asts: Costa 6		Pts: Kim Sun-hyung 15; Rebs: Yang Hee-jong 5 Asts: Kim Sun-hyung 5

Gran Canaria Arena, Las Palmas
Attendance: 2,700
Referees: Elias Koromilas (GRE), Sreten Radović (CRO), Luis Vázquez (PUR)

=== Australia vs. Slovenia ===
This was the second meeting between Australia and Slovenia in the World Cup. Slovenia won their first match-up during the 2010 FIBA World Championship.

30 August 2014
16:30

Boxscore

Australia	80–90	Slovenia
Scoring by quarter: 19–27, 24–22, 17–20, 20–21
Pts: Baynes 21; Rebs: Baynes 7 Asts: Dellavedova 5		Pts: G. Dragić 21; Rebs: G. Dragić, Omić 7 Asts: G. Dragić 4

Gran Canaria Arena, Las Palmas
Attendance: 5,900
Referees: Steven Anderson (USA), Reynaldo Mercedes (DOM), Eddie Viator (FRA)

=== Mexico vs. Lithuania ===
This was the first meeting between Mexico and Lithuania.

30 August 2014
19:00

Boxscore

Mexico	74–87	Lithuania
Scoring by quarter: 27–22, 14–23, 12–22, 21–20
Pts: Cruz 21; Rebs: Ayón 6 Asts: Cruz 4		Pts: Mačiulis 19; Rebs: Valančiūnas 5 Asts: Seibutis 5

Gran Canaria Arena, Las Palmas
Attendance: 6,200
Referees: Marcos Benito (BRA), Robert Lottermoser (GER), Kingsley Ojeaburu (NGA)

== 31 August ==
=== Korea vs. Australia ===
This was the third meeting between Australia and South Korea in the World Cup. Australia won in the 1994 FIBA World Championship, while the South Koreans won in 1970. The last competitive meeting between the two was at the 1996 Olympics where the Australians won.

31 August 2014
12:30

Boxscore

South Korea	55–89	Australia
Scoring by quarter: 17–26, 12–18, 12–22, 14–23
Pts: Kim S. 13; Rebs: Oh Se-keun 4 Asts: Park Chan-hee 4		Pts: Ingles 17; Rebs: Baynes 10; Asts: Dellavedova 8

Gran Canaria Arena, Las Palmas
Attendance: 5,524
Referees: Eddie Viator (FRA), Steven Anderson (USA), Kingsley Ojeaburu (NGA)

=== Slovenia vs. Mexico ===
This was the first meeting between Slovenia and Mexico.

31 August 2014
16:30

Boxscore

Slovenia	89–68	Mexico
Scoring by quarter: 24–18, 22–19, 19–13, 24–18
Pts: Z. Dragić 22; Rebs: Murić 4 Asts: G. Dragić 6		Pts: Ayón 23; Rebs: Hernández 5 Asts: Cruz 4

Gran Canaria Arena, Las Palmas
Attendance: 5,680
Referees: Marcos Benito (BRA), Elias Koromilas (GRE), Robert Lottermoser (GER)

=== Lithuania vs. Angola ===
This was the first meeting between Lithuania and Angola in the World Cup. The Lithuanians have won both of their games against Angola in the 1996 and 2004 Olympics.

31 August 2014
19:00

Boxscore

Lithuania	75–62	Angola
Scoring by quarter: 23–22, 15–13, 25–14, 12–13
Pts: Motiejūnas 12; Rebs: Valančiūnas 13; Asts: Seibutis 4		Pts: Mingas 14; Rebs: Mingas 9 Asts: Cipriano 3

Gran Canaria Arena, Las Palmas
Attendance: 5,680
Referees: Reynaldo Mercedes (DOM), Yevgeniy Mikheyev (KAZ), Luis Vázquez (PUR)

== 2 September ==
=== Angola vs. Mexico ===
This was the first competitive game between Angola and Mexico.

2 September 2014
12:30

Boxscore

Angola	55–79	Mexico
Scoring by quarter: 20–15, 15–21, 10–21, 10–22
Pts: V. Joaquim 13; Rebs: Moreira 9 Asts: Barros 3		Pts: Hernández 24; Rebs: Ayón 12; Asts: Cruz 4

Gran Canaria Arena, Las Palmas
Attendance: 5,565
Referees: Sreten Radović (CRO), Elias Koromilas (GRE), Eddie Viator (FRA)

=== Australia vs. Lithuania ===
This was the second meeting between Australia and Lithuania in the World Cup. Lithuania won in the 2010 FIBA World Championship, while the Australians won in 1998. Australia won at the 2008 Olympics, its last competitive game against Lithuania.

2 September 2014
16:30

Boxscore

Australia	82–75	Lithuania
Scoring by quarter: 30–20, 17–8, 15–28, 20–19
Pts: Ingles 18; Rebs: Baynes 6 Asts: Ingles 4		Pts: Seibutis 21; Rebs: Valančiūnas 6 Asts: Seibutis 3

Gran Canaria Arena, Las Palmas
Attendance: 5,657
Referees: Reynaldo Mercedes (DOM), Marcos Benito (BRA), Luis Vázquez (PUR)

=== Korea vs. Slovenia ===
This was the first competitive game between South Korea and Slovenia.

2 September 2014
19:00

Boxscore

South Korea	72–89	Slovenia
Scoring by quarter: 21–19, 18–21, 17–30, 16–19
Pts: Lee Jong-hyun 12; Rebs: Kim Jong-kyu 6 Asts: Moon Tae-jong 3		Pts: G. Dragić 22; Rebs: Omić 11; Asts: G. Dragić 4

Gran Canaria Arena, Las Palmas
Attendance: 8,190
Referees: Steven Anderson (USA), Robert Lottermoser (GER), Yevgeniy Mikheyev (KAZ)

== 3 September ==
=== Mexico vs. Australia ===
This was the second meeting between Mexico and Australia in the World Cup. Mexico won the first match-up during the 1974 FIBA World Championship. The Australians also won both of their games against Mexico at the Olympics, in 1964 and 1976.

3 September 2014
12:30

Boxscore

Mexico	62–70	Australia
Scoring by quarter: 19–22, 13–11, 13–26, 17–11
Pts: Ayón 11; Rebs: Ayón 9 Asts: Méndez 5		Pts: Baynes 21; Rebs: Andersen 7 Asts: Ingles 5

Gran Canaria Arena, Las Palmas
Attendance: 5,494
Referees: Sreten Radović (CRO), Robert Lottermoser (GER), Luis Vázquez (PUR)

=== Slovenia vs. Angola ===
This was the first competitive game between Slovenia and Angola.

3 September 2014
16:30

Boxscore

Slovenia	93–87	Angola
Scoring by quarter: 17–17, 27–26, 21–23, 28–21
Pts: Lorbek 17; Rebs: Z. Dragić 7 Asts: Lorbek 4		Pts: Fortes 21; Rebs: Moore 6 Asts: Costa 6

Gran Canaria Arena, Las Palmas
Attendance: 5,558
Referees: Eddie Viator (FRA), Reynaldo Mercedes (DOM), Kingsley Ojeaburu (NGA)

=== Lithuania vs. Korea ===
This was the second competitive game between Lithuania and South Korea. Lithuania previously won at the 1998 FIBA World Championship.

3 September 2014
19:00

Boxscore

Lithuania	79–49	South Korea
Scoring by quarter: 17–19, 22–10, 18–4, 22–16
Pts: Juškevičius 20; Rebs: Motiejūnas 7 Asts: Motiejūnas 5		Pts: Moon Tae-jong 15; Rebs: Lee Jong-hyun, Oh Se-keun 4 Asts: Kim Tae-sul 4

Gran Canaria Arena, Las Palmas
Attendance: 7,850
Referees: Elias Koromilas (GRE), Steven Anderson (USA), Yevgeniy Mikheyev (KAZ)

== 4 September ==
=== Australia vs. Angola ===
This was the third meeting between Australia and Angola in the World Cup. The Australians won in the 2010 FIBA World Championship, while Angola won in 1986.

4 September 2014
12:30

Boxscore

Australia	83–91	Angola
Scoring by quarter: 22–17, 20–12, 23–34, 18–28
Pts: Goulding 22; Rebs: Goulding 6 Asts: Exum 6		Pts: Moreira 38; Rebs: Moreira 15; Asts: Costa 6

Gran Canaria Arena, Las Palmas
Attendance: 5,647
Referees: Sreten Radović (CRO), Yevgeniy Mikheyev (KAZ), Robert Lottermoser (GER)

=== Korea vs. Mexico ===
This was the first meeting between South Korea and Mexico in the World Cup. The Mexicans have previously defeated South Korea in the 1948 and 1968 Olympics.

4 September 2014
16:30

Boxscore

South Korea	71–87	Mexico
Scoring by quarter: 11–18, 19–22, 17–21, 24–26
Pts: Moon Tae-jong 16; Rebs: Yang Hee-jong 5 Asts: Cho Sung-min, Yang Dong-geun 4		Pts: Hernández 16; Rebs: Hernández 11; Asts: Méndez-Valdez 5

Gran Canaria Arena, Las Palmas
Attendance: 4,775
Referees: Marcos Benito (BRA), Kingsley Ojeaburu (NGA), Luis Vázquez (PUR)

=== Lithuania vs. Slovenia ===
This was the first meeting between Lithuania and Slovenia in the World Cup. Lithuania had previously won against Slovenia five times in seven games at the EuroBasket, with the last win coming at 2011.

4 September 2014
20:30

Boxscore

Lithuania	67–64	Slovenia
Scoring by quarter: 22–24, 14–20, 19–18, 12–2
Pts: Valančiūnas 12; Rebs: Lavrinovič 8 Asts: Juškevičius 3		Pts: Lorbek 14; Rebs: Z. Dragić 6 Asts: G. Dragić 4

Gran Canaria Arena, Las Palmas
Attendance: 9,713
Referees: Steven Anderson (USA), Elias Koromilas (GRE), Eddie Viator (FRA)
