= 2014 FIBA Basketball World Cup Group A =

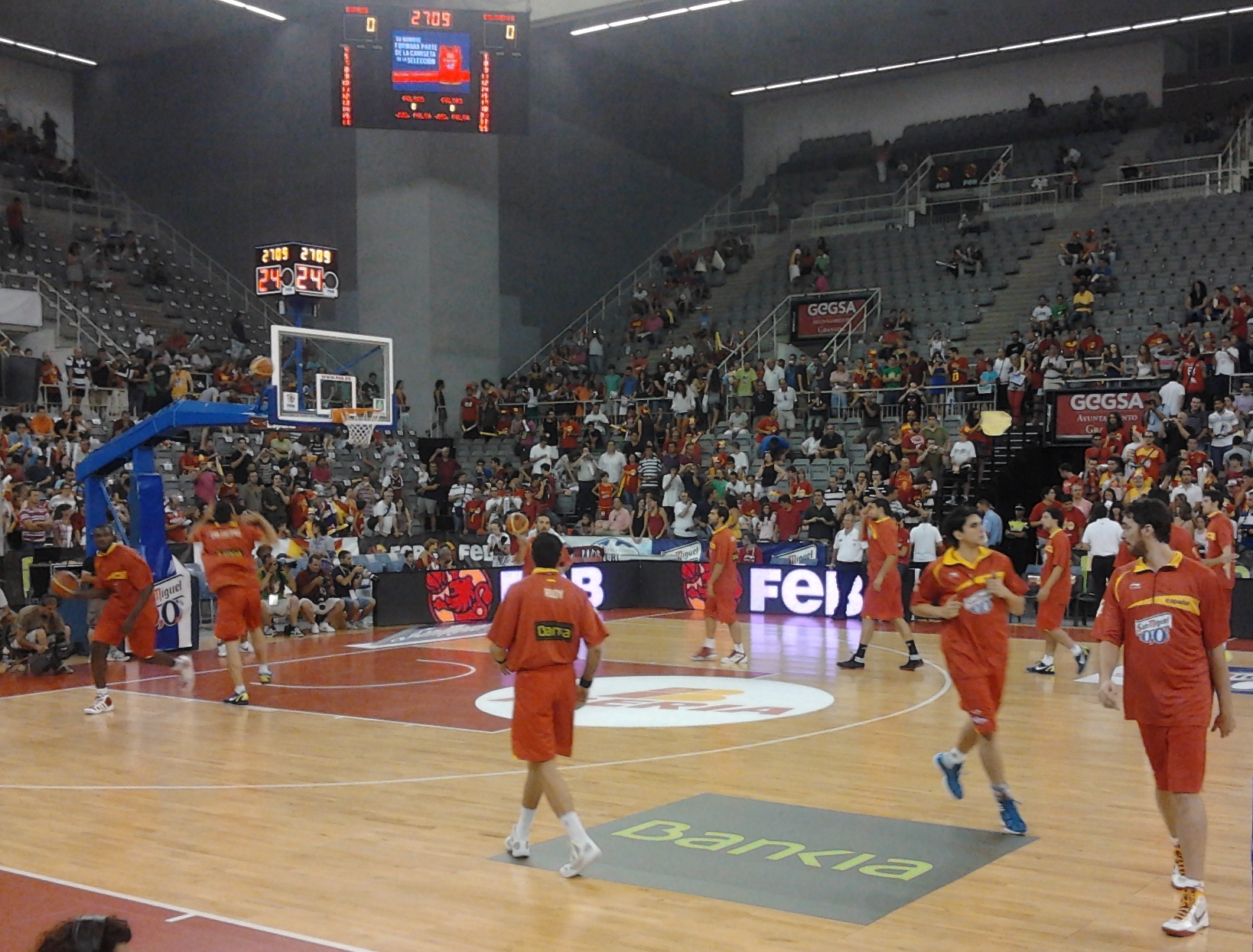
Palacio Municipal de Deportes de Granada, host of Group A games.

Group A of the 2014 FIBA Basketball World Cup was the group stage of the 2014 FIBA Basketball World Cup for Spain, Serbia, France, Brazil, Egypt and Iran. Each team played each other once, for a total of five games per team, with all games played at Palacio Municipal de Deportes de Granada, Granada. After all of the games were played, the four teams with the best records qualified for the final round.

== Teams ==
Team	Qualification		Appearance			Best performance	FIBA World Ranking
Team	As	Date	Last	Total	Streak	Best performance	FIBA World Ranking
Spain	Host	May 23, 2009	2010	11	9	Champions (2006) / Final	2
Serbia	FIBA Eurobasket 2013 7th place	September 21, 2013	2010	15	5	Champions (1998, 2002) / Final (1998, 2002)	11
France	FIBA EuroBasket 2013 winner	September 18, 2013	2010	6	3	4th place (1954) / Final round	8
Brazil	Wild card selection	February 1, 2014	2010	17	17	Champions (1959, 1963) / Final round	10
Egypt	2013 FIBA Africa Championship runner-up	August 30, 2013	1994	6	1	5th place (1950) / Final round	46
Iran	2013 FIBA Asia Championship winner	August 10, 2013	2010	2	2	19th place (2010) / Classification round	20

== Standings ==
Pos	Team	Pld	W	L	PF	PA	PD	Pts	Qualification
1	Spain (H)	5	5	0	440	314	+126	10	Round of 16
2	Brazil	5	4	1	416	333	+83	9	Round of 16
3	France	5	3	2	376	357	+19	8	Round of 16
4	Serbia	5	2	3	387	378	+9	7	Round of 16
5	Iran	5	1	4	344	406	−62	6	
6	Egypt	5	0	5	311	486	−175	5	

Source: FIBA archive
Rules for classification: 1) points; 2) head-to-head points; 3) head-to-head goal average; 4) head-to-head number of points scored.
(H) Hosts

All times are local UTC+2.

== 30 August ==
=== Egypt vs. Serbia ===
This was the first competitive game between Egypt and Serbia.

30 August 2014
15:30

Boxscore

Egypt	64–85	Serbia
Scoring by quarter: 13–21, 18–22, 12–25, 21–17
Pts: El-Gammal 12; Rebs: Elmekawi 5 Asts: El-Sabagh 5		Pts: Teodosić 15; Rebs: Birčević 9 Asts: three players 4

Palacio Municipal de Deportes de Granada, Granada
Attendance: 3,000
Referees: Jorge Vázquez (PUR), Rüştü Nuran (TUR), Michael Weiland (CAN)

=== France vs. Brazil ===
This was the fifth meeting between France and Brazil in the World Cup. Brazil has won three games, with Frances's only win coming from their last meeting in the 1986 FIBA World Championship, which was also their last competitive game against each other.

30 August 2014
18:00

Boxscore

France	63–65	Brazil
Scoring by quarter: 18–11, 8–17, 15–18, 22–19
Pts: Diaw 15; Rebs: Diaw 6 Asts: Diaw 5		Pts: Huertas 16; Rebs: Varejão 9 Asts: Huertas 5

Palacio Municipal de Deportes de Granada, Granada
Attendance: 4,200
Referees: Christos Christodoulou (GRE), Anthony Jordan (USA), Vaughan Mayberry (AUS)

=== Iran vs. Spain ===
This was the first competitive game between Iran and Spain.

30 August 2014
22:00

Boxscore

Iran	60–90	Spain
Scoring by quarter: 18–27, 15–21, 17–22, 10–20
Pts: Kamrani 18; Rebs: Haddadi 15; Asts: Nikkhah 4		Pts: P. Gasol 33; Rebs: M. Gasol 10; Asts: Rubio 5

Palacio Municipal de Deportes de Granada, Granada
Attendance: 7,000
Referees: Guerrino Cerebuch (ITA), Yuji Hirahara (JPN), Borys Ryzhyk (UKR)

== 31 August ==
=== Serbia vs. France ===
This was the first game between Serbia and France in the World Cup. The two teams have met twice in the EuroBasket, with France winning in 2011, and Serbia winning in 2013.

31 August 2014
15:30

Boxscore

Serbia	73–74	France
Scoring by quarter: 21–20, 21–14, 20–26, 11–14
Pts: Raduljica 21; Rebs: Raduljica 7 Asts: Teodosić 5		Pts: Lauvergne 19; Rebs: Batum 6 Asts: Heurtel 6

Palacio Municipal de Deportes de Granada, Granada
Attendance: 7,070
Referees: Guerrino Cerebuch (ITA), Borys Ryzhyk (UKR), Jorge Vázquez (PUR)

=== Brazil vs. Iran ===
This was the second meeting between Brazil and Iran in the World Cup. Brazil won on their first game, in the 2010 FIBA World Championship.

31 August 2014
18:00

Boxscore

Brazil	79–50	Iran
Scoring by quarter: 17–18, 23–6, 21–12, 18–14
Pts: Garcia 12; Rebs: Varejão, Splitter 6 Asts: Huertas 6		Pts: Jamshidi 13; Rebs: Haddadi 7 Asts: Afagh, Jamshidi 2

Palacio Municipal de Deportes de Granada, Granada
Attendance: 7,070
Referees: Michael Weiland (CAN), Oļegs Latiševs (LAT), Rüştü Nuran (TUR)

=== Spain vs. Egypt ===
This was the fourth game between Spain and Egypt in the World Cup. Spain has won two, including their last meeting at the 1994 FIBA World Championship.

31 August 2014
22:00

Boxscore

Spain	91–54	Egypt
Scoring by quarter: 26–10, 16–14, 22–13, 27–17
Pts: Ibaka 18; Rebs: Ibaka 8 Asts: Rubio 7		Pts: El-Gammal 16; Rebs: Ibrahim 7 Asts: El-Gammal 3

Palacio Municipal de Deportes de Granada, Granada
Attendance: 7,691
Referees: Anthony Jordan (USA), Christos Christodoulou (GRE), Vaughan Mayberry (AUS)

== 1 September ==
=== Iran vs. Serbia ===
This was the first competitive game between Iran and Serbia.

1 September 2014
15:30

Boxscore

Iran	70–83	Serbia
Scoring by quarter: 18–21, 20–21, 13–25, 19–16
Pts: Haddadi 29; Rebs: Haddadi 5 Asts: Nikkhah 7		Pts: Bjelica 18; Rebs: Bjelica 10; Asts: Teodosić 9

Palacio Municipal de Deportes de Granada, Granada
Attendance: 6,597
Referees: Christos Christodoulou (GRE), Vaughan Mayberry (AUS), Rüştü Nuran (TUR)

=== France vs. Egypt ===
This was the second game between France and Egypt in the World Cup, with France winning their first meeting in the 1950 FIBA World Championship. France won the last competitive game against Egypt at the 1984 Olympics.

1 September 2014
18:00

Boxscore

France	94–55	Egypt
Scoring by quarter: 23–15, 26–11, 19–10, 26–19
Pts: Lauvergne 12; Rebs: Lauvergne 7 Asts: Heurtel 8		Pts: El-Gammal 12; Rebs: El-Gammal 4 Asts: El-Gammal 3

Palacio Municipal de Deportes de Granada, Granada
Attendance: 6,597
Referees: Michael Weiland (CAN), Yuji Hirahara (JPN), Oļegs Latiševs (LAT)

=== Brazil vs. Spain ===
This was the eighth game between Brazil and Spain. Spain has won 6 games, including their last game in the 2002 FIBA World Championship, with Brazil's only win coming from their meeting in the 1986 FIBA World Championship. Brazil won in the last competitive game against Spain at the 2012 Olympics.

1 September 2014
22:00

Boxscore

Brazil	63–82	Spain
Scoring by quarter: 14–30, 18–15, 15–21, 16–16
Pts: Barbosa 11; Rebs: Nenê, Marquinhos 5 Asts: Barbosa, Taylor 2		Pts: P. Gasol 26; Rebs: P. Gasol 9 Asts: Rubio 6

Palacio Municipal de Deportes de Granada, Granada
Attendance: 8,810
Referees: Jorge Vázquez (PUR), Anthony Jordan (USA), Borys Ryzhyk (UKR)

== 3 September ==
=== Egypt vs. Iran ===
This was the first game between Egypt and Iran.

3 September 2014
15:30

Boxscore

Egypt	73–88	Iran
Scoring by quarter: 15–27, 26–21, 15–16, 17–24
Pts: Shousha 15; Rebs: Kamal 5 Asts: El-Gammal, El-Sabagh 3		Pts: Nikkhah 24; Rebs: Haddadi 15; Asts: Nikkhah 6

Palacio Municipal de Deportes de Granada, Granada
Attendance: 4,122
Referees: Anthony Jordan (USA), Yuji Hirahara (JPN), Borys Ryzhyk (UKR)

=== Serbia vs. Brazil ===
This was the first competitive game between Serbia and Brazil.

3 September 2014
18:00

Boxscore

Serbia	73–81	Brazil
Scoring by quarter: 16–23, 16–25, 32–12, 9–21
Pts: Teodosić 14; Rebs: Bjelica, Raduljica 5 Asts: Teodosić 5		Pts: Vieira 21; Rebs: Varejão 9 Asts: Splitter 6

Palacio Municipal de Deportes de Granada, Granada
Attendance: 4,122
Referees: Christos Christodoulou (GRE), Vaughan Mayberry (AUS), Michael Weiland (CAN)

=== Spain vs. France ===
This was the third game between France and Spain in the World Cup. Both teams split their first two games, with France winning in their last game at the 2010 FIBA World Championship. The French won at the FIBA EuroBasket 2013 semifinals, the last competitive game between them.

3 September 2014
22:00

Boxscore

Spain	88–64	France
Scoring by quarter: 22–19, 22–15, 21–16, 23–14
Pts: M. Gasol 17; Rebs: Ibaka 8 Asts: Rubio 8		Pts: Batum, Diot 11; Rebs: Pietrus 8 Asts: Diaw 3

Palacio Municipal de Deportes de Granada, Granada
Attendance: 8,849
Referees: Guerrino Cerebuch (ITA), Oļegs Latiševs (LAT), Jorge Vázquez (PUR)

== 4 September ==
=== Brazil vs. Egypt ===
This was the second game between Brazil and Egypt in the World Cup. Brazil won their first meeting in the 1950 FIBA World Championship. Their latest competitive game against each other was a Brazil victory at the 1988 Olympics.

4 September 2014
15:30

Boxscore

Brazil	128–65	Egypt
Scoring by quarter: 37–10, 30–13, 24–25, 37–17
Pts: Barbosa 22; Rebs: Varejão 10; Asts: Neto 10		Pts: El-Gammal 16; Rebs: Gendy, Elmekawi 5 Asts: El-Gammal 5

Palacio Municipal de Deportes de Granada, Granada
Attendance: 6,928
Referees: Guerrino Cerebuch (ITA), Oļegs Latiševs (LAT), Borys Ryzhyk (UKR)

=== Iran vs. France ===
This was the first game between Iran and France in the World Cup. Their only other competitive meeting was in the 1948 Olympics in which France won.

4 September 2014
18:00

Boxscore

Iran	76–81	France
Scoring by quarter: 23–13, 10–24, 16–26, 27–18
Pts: Nikkhah 23; Rebs: Haddadi 15; Asts: Kamrani 5		Pts: Heurtel 15; Rebs: Lauvergne 5 Asts: Heurtel 4

Palacio Municipal de Deportes de Granada, Granada
Attendance: 6,928
Referees: Michael Weiland (CAN), Yuji Hirahara (JPN), Vaughan Mayberry (AUS)

=== Serbia vs. Spain ===
This was the second meeting between Serbia and Spain in the World Cup. Serbia defeated Spain in their meeting at the 2010 FIBA World Championship. Spain won the last competitive game against Serbia at the FIBA EuroBasket 2013.

4 September 2014
22:00

Boxscore

Serbia	73–89	Spain
Scoring by quarter: 20–34, 15–20, 21–17, 17–18
Pts: Bjelica 19; Rebs: Bjelica 10; Asts: Bogdanović 4		Pts: P. Gasol 20; Rebs: M. Gasol 8 Asts: Rubio 6

Palacio Municipal de Deportes de Granada, Granada
Attendance: 8,559
Referees: Anthony Jordan (USA), Rüştü Nuran (TUR), Jorge Vázquez (PUR)
