= 2014 FIBA Basketball World Cup Group C =

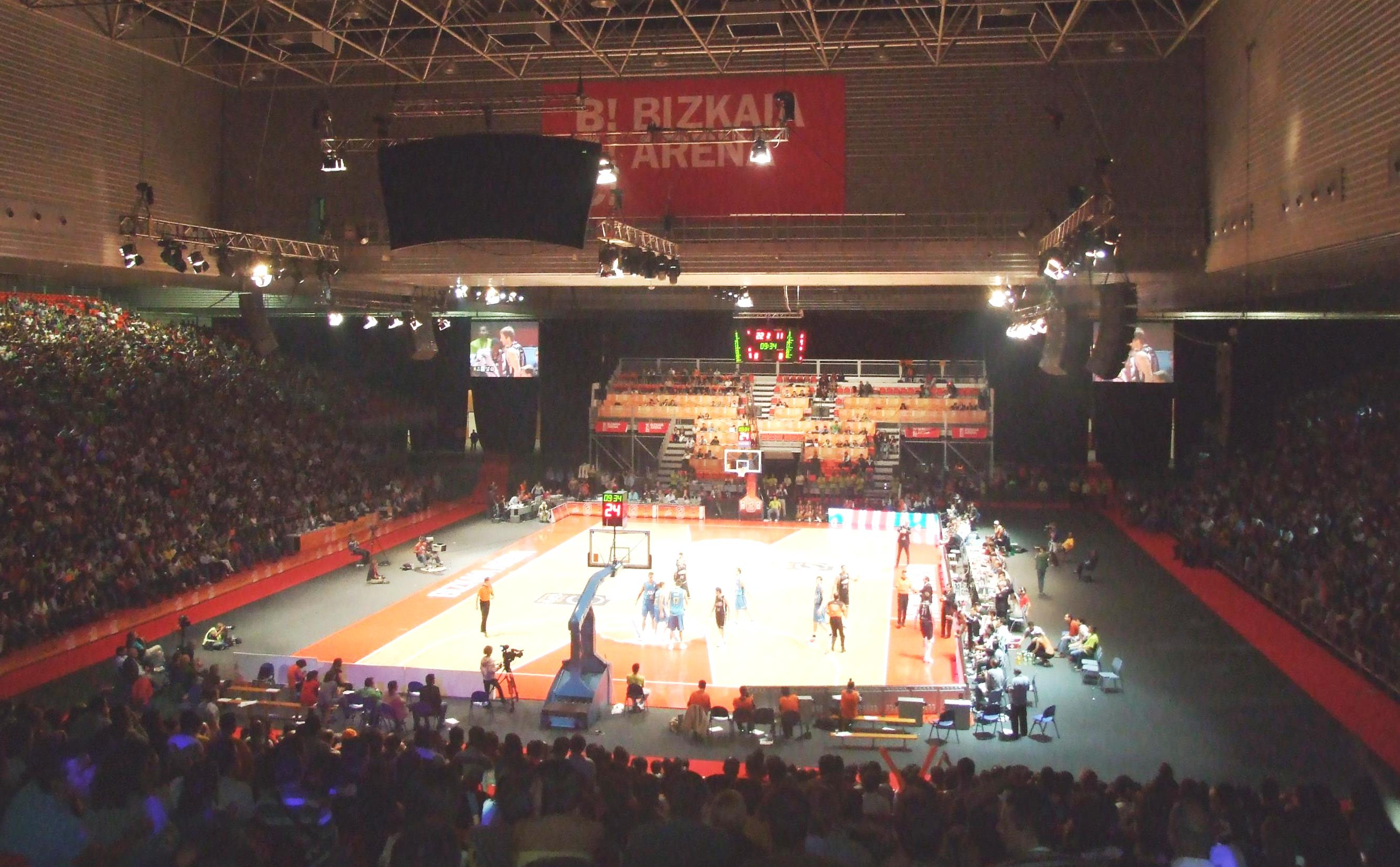
Bizkaia Arena, host of Group C games.

Group C of the 2014 FIBA Basketball World Cup was the group stage of the 2014 FIBA Basketball World Cup for the Dominican Republic, Turkey, the United States, Finland, New Zealand and Ukraine. Each team played each other once, for a total of five games per team, with all of the games played at Bizkaia Arena, Barakaldo (at Greater Bilbao). After all of the games were played, the four teams with the best records qualified for the final round.

== Teams ==
Team	Qualification		Appearance			Best performance	FIBA World Ranking
Team	As	Date	Last	Total	Streak	Best performance	FIBA World Ranking
Dominican Republic	2013 FIBA Americas Championship 4th place	September 8, 2013	1978	2	1	12th place (1978) / Preliminary round	26
Turkey	Wild card selection	February 1, 2014	2010	4	4	2nd place (2010) / Final	7
United States	Gold medalist at the 2012 Summer Olympics	August 12, 2012	2010	17	17	Champions (1954, 1986, 1994, 2010) / Final round (1954), Final (1986, 1994, 2010)	1
Finland	Wild card selection	February 1, 2014	—N/a	1	1	Debut	39
New Zealand	2013 FIBA Oceania Championship runner-up	August 18, 2013	2010	5	4	4th place (2002) / Third place playoff	19
Ukraine	FIBA EuroBasket 2013 6th place	September 20, 2013	—N/a	1	1	Debut	45

== Standings ==
Pos	Team	Pld	W	L	PF	PA	PD	Pts	Qualification
1	United States	5	5	0	511	345	+166	10	Round of 16
2	Turkey	5	3	2	365	372	−7	8	Round of 16
3	Dominican Republic	5	2	3	347	386	−39	7 (Note: Head-to-head record: Dominican Republic 1–1 (1.022 GAvg), New Zealand 1–1 (0.993 GAvg), Ukraine 1–1 (0.985 GAvg),)	Round of 16
4	New Zealand	5	2	3	347	376	−29	7	Round of 16
5	Ukraine	5	2	3	344	369	−25	7	
6	Finland	5	1	4	342	408	−66	6	

Source: FIBA archive
Rules for classification: 1) points; 2) head-to-head points; 3) head-to-head goal average; 4) head-to-head number of points scored.
Notes:

All times are local UTC+2.

== 30 August ==
=== Ukraine vs. Dominican Republic ===
This was the first competitive game between Ukraine and the Dominican Republic.

30 August 2014
12:30

Boxscore

Ukraine	72–62	Dominican Republic
Scoring by quarter: 12–13, 15–14, 21–13, 24–22
Pts: Jeter 16; Rebs: Korniyenko, Kravtsov 7 Asts: Gladyr 3		Pts: García 18; Rebs: Vargas, Báez 9 Asts: García 4

Bizkaia Arena, Barakaldo
Attendance: 6,500
Referees: Milivoje Jovčić (SRB), Matej Boltauzer (SLO), Alejandro Chiti (ARG)

=== New Zealand vs. Turkey ===
This was the first competitive game between New Zealand and Turkey.

30 August 2014
16:00

Boxscore

New Zealand	73–76	Turkey
Scoring by quarter: 17–8, 21–20, 18–24, 17–24
Pts: C. Webster 22; Rebs: Vukona 8 Asts: Tait 3		Pts: Savaş 16; Rebs: Preldžić 6 Asts: Hersek, Preldžič 3

Bizkaia Arena, Barakaldo
Attendance: 6,800
Referees: Cristiano Maranho (BRA), Joseph Bissang (FRA), Ferdinand Pascual (PHI)

=== United States vs. Finland ===
This was the first competitive game between the US and Finland in the World Cup. The Americans defeated the Finns in their only other match-up at the 1964 Olympics.

30 August 2014
21:30

Boxscore

United States	114–55	Finland
Scoring by quarter: 31–16, 29–2, 29–21, 25–16
Pts: Thompson 18; Rebs: Cousins 10; Asts: Curry 5		Pts: Huff, Koponen 12; Rebs: Murphy 7 Asts: Koponen 4

Bizkaia Arena, Barakaldo
Attendance: 11,300
Referees: Miguel Pérez (ESP), Arnaud Kom Njilo (CMR), Alejandro Sánchez (URU)

== 31 August ==
=== Dominican Republic vs. New Zealand ===
This was the first competitive game between the Dominican Republic and the New Zealand.

31 August 2014
12:30

Boxscore

Dominican Republic	76–63	New Zealand
Scoring by quarter: 14–16, 20–11, 17–23, 25–13
Pts: García 29; Rebs: Báez 9 Asts: Coronado, Feldeine 4		Pts: Abercrombie 22; Rebs: Penney 5 Asts: four players 3

Bizkaia Arena, Barakaldo
Attendance: 14,427
Referees: Miguel Pérez (ESP), Matej Boltauzer (SLO), Arnaud Kom Njilo (CMR)

=== Finland vs. Ukraine ===
This was the first competitive game between Finland and Ukraine in the World Cup. The two teams previously met twice in qualifying for the 1995 EuroBasket, with Finland winning both match-ups.

31 August 2014
16:00

Boxscore

Finland	81–76	Ukraine
Scoring by quarter: 20–22, 15–15, 22–15, 24–24
Pts: Huff 23; Rebs: Murphy, Huff 8 Asts: Koponen 9		Pts: Jeter 24; Rebs: Kravtsov 8 Asts: Jeter 9

Bizkaia Arena, Barakaldo
Attendance: 14,427
Referees: Cristiano Maranho (BRA), Milivoje Jovčić (SRB), Ferdinand Pascual (PHI)

=== Turkey vs. United States ===
This was the second meeting between Turkey and the United States. The Americans won the last match-up at the 2010 FIBA World Championship Final.

31 August 2014
21:30

Boxscore

Turkey	77–98	United States
Scoring by quarter: 16–16, 24–19, 20–31, 17–32
Pts: Akyol 12; Rebs: Aşık 8 Asts: Preldžić 5		Pts: Faried 22; Rebs: Faried 8 Asts: Harden 7

Bizkaia Arena, Barakaldo
Attendance: 14,637
Referees: Alejandro Chiti (ARG), Joseph Bissang (FRA), Alejandro Sánchez (URU)

== 2 September ==
=== Ukraine vs. Turkey ===
This was the first competitive game between Ukraine and Turkey in the World Cup. The two teams have previously met seven times in the EuroBasket, with Turkey winning five games, including the last match-up at EuroBasket Division A 2009.

2 September 2014
15:00

Boxscore

Ukraine	64–58	Turkey
Scoring by quarter: 13–13, 12–13, 16–13, 23–19
Pts: Mishula 19; Rebs: Kravtsov 7 Asts: Jeter 6		Pts: Aşık 16; Rebs: Aşık 20; Asts: Hersek, Preldžić 3

Bizkaia Arena, Barakaldo
Attendance: 14,399
Referees: Miguel Pérez (ESP), Alejandro Chiti (ARG), Alejandro Sánchez (URU)

=== United States vs. New Zealand ===
This was the second meeting between the US and the New Zealand in the World Cup. The Americans won the first match-up, at the 2002 FIBA World Championship.

2 September 2014
17:30

Boxscore

United States	98–71	New Zealand
Scoring by quarter: 27–20, 30–15, 18–19, 23–17
Pts: Davis 21; Rebs: Faried 11; Asts: Harden 4		Pts: Anthony 11; Rebs: Vukona, Abercrombie 5 Asts: Tait 3

Bizkaia Arena, Barakaldo
Attendance: 14,399
Referees: Milivoje Jovčić (SRB), Matej Boltauzer (SLO), Ferdinand Pascual (PHI)

=== Finland vs. Dominican Republic ===
This was the first competitive game between Finland and the Dominican Republic.

2 September 2014
21:30

Boxscore

Finland	68–74	Dominican Republic
Scoring by quarter: 15–16, 17–25, 18–19, 18–14
Pts: Koponen 23; Rebs: Lee 6 Asts: Koponen 9		Pts: Vargas 18; Rebs: Vargas 13; Asts: Feldeine 6

Bizkaia Arena, Barakaldo
Attendance: 14,446
Referees: Cristiano Maranho (BRA), Joseph Bissang (FRA), Arnaud Kom Njilo (CMR)

== 3 September ==
=== New Zealand vs. Ukraine ===
This was the first competitive game between New Zealand and Ukraine.

3 September 2014
15:00

Boxscore

New Zealand	73–61	Ukraine
Scoring by quarter: 18–19, 18–11, 17–15, 20–16
Pts: Penney 17; Rebs: Fotu 10; Asts: Frank 4		Pts: Korniyenko 15; Rebs: Natyazhko 6 Asts: Jeter 6

Bizkaia Arena, Barakaldo
Attendance: 7,290
Referees: Cristiano Maranho (BRA), Arnaud Kom Njilo (CMR), Miguel Pérez (ESP)

=== Turkey vs. Finland ===
This was the first competitive game between Turkey and Finland in the World Cup. The two teams have previously met six times in EuroBasket with Turkey winning four of them. Last meeting in EuroBasket 2013 went to Finland.

3 September 2014
17:30

Boxscore

Turkey	77–73 (OT)	Finland
Scoring by quarter: 10–15, 17–26, 26–18, 15–9, Overtime: 9–5
Pts: Aşık 22; Rebs: three players 8 Asts: Güler, Preldžić 5		Pts: Koponen 17; Rebs: Murphy 6 Asts: Koponen 5

Bizkaia Arena, Barakaldo
Attendance: 7,290
Referees: Matej Boltauzer (SLO), Milivoje Jovčić (SRB), Ferdinand Pascual (PHI)

=== Dominican Republic vs. United States ===
This was the second meeting between the Dominican Republic and the US in the World Cup. The Americans won the first match-up at the 1978 FIBA World Championship. The Americans won in their last competitive game against the Dominicans at the 2005 FIBA Americas Championship.

3 September 2014
21:30

Boxscore

Dominican Republic	71–106	United States
Scoring by quarter: 22–25, 19–31, 11–25, 19–25
Pts: Liz 15; Rebs: Feldeine 8 Asts: Feldeine, Sosa 4		Pts: Faried 16; Rebs: Davis 8 Asts: Curry 7

Bizkaia Arena, Barakaldo
Attendance: 14,104
Referees: Joseph Bissang (FRA), Alejandro Chiti (ARG), Alejandro Sánchez (URU)

== 4 September ==
=== Finland vs. New Zealand ===
This was the first competitive game between Finland and New Zealand.

4 September 2014
15:00

Boxscore

Finland	65–67	New Zealand
Scoring by quarter: 12–18, 20–26, 13–13, 20–10
Pts: Lee 17; Rebs: three players 5 Asts: Rannikko 7		Pts: Fotu 18; Rebs: Vukona 12; Asts: Tait 5

Bizkaia Arena, Barakaldo
Attendance: 15,483
Referees: Miguel Pérez (ESP), Alejandro Chiti (ARG), Alejandro Sánchez (URU)

=== Ukraine vs. United States ===
This was the first competitive game between Ukraine and the USA.

4 September 2014
17:30

Boxscore

Ukraine	71–95	United States
Scoring by quarter: 19–14, 13–30, 22–25, 17–26
Pts: Kravtsov 15; Rebs: Korniyenko 6 Asts: Mishula 4		Pts: Harden 17; Rebs: Faried 8 Asts: Irving 6

Bizkaia Arena, Barakaldo
Attendance: 15,483
Referees: Matej Boltauzer (SLO), Arnaud Kom Njilo (CMR), Ferdinand Pascual (PHI)

=== Turkey vs. Dominican Republic ===
This was the first competitive game between Turkey and the Dominican Republic.

4 September 2014
21:30

Boxscore

Turkey	75–61	Dominican Republic
Scoring by quarter: 14–13, 27–10, 19–18, 17–23
Pts: Savaş 15; Rebs: Aşık 10; Asts: Preldžić, Tunçeri 5		Pts: García 18; Rebs: Martínez 9 Asts: Coronado 6

Bizkaia Arena, Barakaldo
Attendance: 10,303
Referees: Cristiano Maranho (BRA), Joseph Bissang (FRA), Milivoje Jovčić (SRB)
