= 2014 FIBA Basketball World Cup Group B =

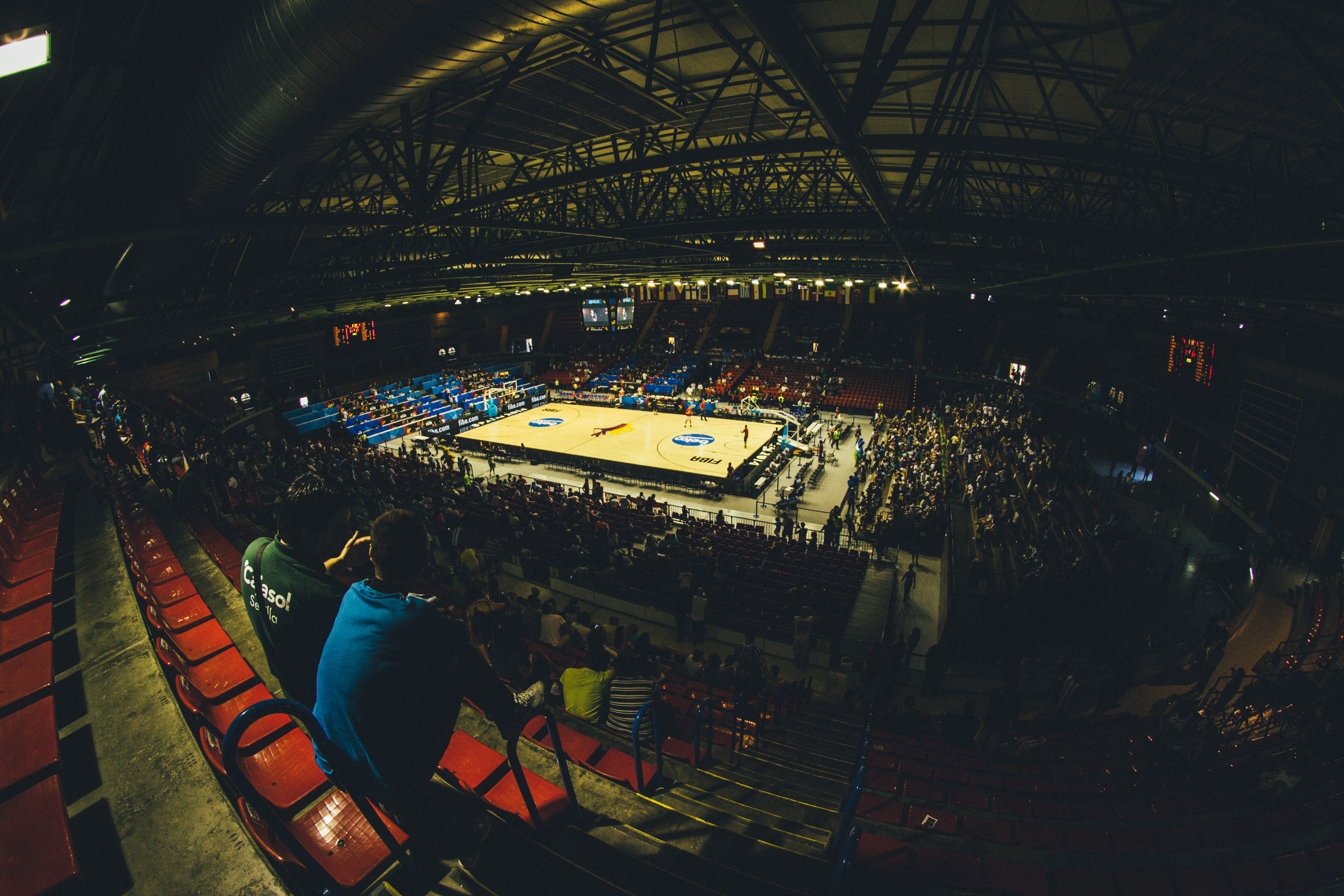
Palacio Municipal de Deportes San Pablo, host of Group B games.

Group B of the 2014 FIBA Basketball World Cup was the group stage of the 2014 FIBA Basketball World Cup for the Philippines, Senegal, Puerto Rico, Argentina, Greece and Croatia. Each team played each other once, for a total of five games per team, with all games played at Palacio Municipal de Deportes San Pablo, Seville. After all of the games were played, the four teams with the best records qualified for the final round.

== Teams ==
Team	Qualification		Appearance			Best performance	FIBA World Ranking
Team	As	Date	Last	Total	Streak	Best performance	FIBA World Ranking
Philippines	2013 FIBA Asia Championship runner-up	August 10, 2013	1978	5	1	3rd place (1954) / Final round	34
Senegal	2013 FIBA Africa Championship 3rd place	August 31, 2013	2006	4	1	14th place (1978) / Preliminary round	41
Puerto Rico	2013 FIBA Americas Championship runner-up	September 7, 2013	2010	12	8	4th place (1990) / Third place playoff	17
Argentina	2013 FIBA Americas Championship 3rd place	September 8, 2013	2010	13	8	Champions (1950) / Final round	3
Greece	Wild card selection	February 1, 2014	2010	6	3	2nd place (2006) / Final	5
Croatia	FIBA EuroBasket 2013 4th place	September 19, 2013	2010	3	2	3rd place (1994) / Third place playoff	16

== Standings ==
Pos	Team	Pld	W	L	PF	PA	PD	Pts	Qualification
1	Greece	5	5	0	414	349	+65	10	Round of 16
2	Croatia	5	3	2	414	398	+16	8 (Note: Head-to-head record: Croatia 1–0 Argentina)	Round of 16
3	Argentina	5	3	2	420	371	+49	8	Round of 16
4	Senegal	5	2	3	348	399	−51	7	Round of 16
5	Puerto Rico	5	1	4	388	446	−58	6 (Note: Head-to-head record: Puerto Rico 1–0 Philippines)	
6	Philippines	5	1	4	383	404	−21	6	

Source: FIBA archive
Rules for classification: 1) points; 2) head-to-head points; 3) head-to-head goal average; 4) head-to-head number of points scored.
Notes:

All times are local UTC+2.

== 30 August ==
=== Croatia vs. Philippines ===
This was the first competitive game between Croatia and the Philippines.

30 August 2014
12:30

Boxscore

Croatia	81–78 (OT)	Philippines
Scoring by quarter: 23–9, 14–22, 20–18, 14–22, Overtime: 10–7
Pts: Bogdanović 26; Rebs: Tomić 11; Asts: Tomić, Šarić 4		Pts: Blatche 28; Rebs: Blatche 12; Asts: Alapag 6

Palacio Municipal de Deportes San Pablo, Seville
Attendance: 3,500
Referees: José Reyes (MEX), Mohammad Al-Amiri (KUW), Fernando Rocha (POR)

=== Puerto Rico vs. Argentina ===
This was the second meeting between Puerto Rico and Argentina in the World Cup. Puerto Rico won the first meeting in the 1990 FIBA World Championship. In their last competitive game against each other, Puerto Rico defeated Argentina in the 2013 FIBA Americas Championship.

30 August 2014
17:30

Boxscore

Puerto Rico	75–98	Argentina
Scoring by quarter: 19–27, 19–18, 11–24, 26–29
Pts: Barea 24; Rebs: Clemente 6 Asts: Barea 4		Pts: Scola 20; Rebs: Nocioni 11; Asts: Prigioni 10

Palacio Municipal de Deportes San Pablo, Seville
Attendance: 5,300
Referees: Luigi Lamonica (ITA), Michael Aylen (AUS), Ilija Belošević (SRB)

=== Greece vs. Senegal ===
This was the second meeting between Greece and Senegal in the World Cup. Greece won the first meeting in the 1998 FIBA World Championship.

30 August 2014
20:00

Boxscore

Greece	87–64	Senegal
Scoring by quarter: 18–9, 27–8, 19–19, 23–28
Pts: Kaimakoglou 20; Rebs: Kaimakoglou 8 Asts: Sloukas 4		Pts: Dieng 21; Rebs: Dieng 14; Asts: three players 2

Palacio Municipal de Deportes San Pablo, Seville
Attendance: 3,100
Referees: Juan González (ESP), Carlos Julio (ANG), Stephen Seibel (CAN)

== 31 August ==
=== Argentina vs. Croatia ===
This was the first meeting between Argentina and the Croatia in the World Cup. The two teams previously met in the Summer Olympics, Argentina won in the 2008 Olympics, while Croatia won in 1996.

31 August 2014
13:30

Boxscore

Argentina	85–90	Croatia
Scoring by quarter: 20–28, 24–18, 19–29, 22–15
Pts: Scola 30; Rebs: Scola 9 Asts: Campazzo 6		Pts: Simon 18; Rebs: Šarić 9 Asts: Lafayette 9

Palacio Municipal de Deportes San Pablo, Seville
Attendance: 6,109
Referees: Juan González (ESP), José Reyes (MEX), Fernando Rocha (POR)

=== Senegal vs. Puerto Rico ===
This was the third meeting between Senegal and Puerto Rico in the World Cup. Puerto Rico won the first two games, including their last match-up in the 2006 FIBA World Championship.

31 August 2014
17:30

Boxscore

Senegal	82–75	Puerto Rico
Scoring by quarter: 20–29, 21–11, 22–18, 19–17
Pts: Faye 20; Rebs: Dieng 13; Asts: D'Almeida, Diop 3		Pts: Balkman 21; Rebs: Balkman, Santiago 7 Asts: Rivera 5

Palacio Municipal de Deportes San Pablo, Seville
Attendance: 5,554
Referees: Michael Aylen (AUS), Ilija Belošević (SRB), Carlos Julio (ANG)

=== Philippines vs. Greece ===
This was the first competitive game between the Philippines and Greece.

31 August 2014
20:00

Boxscore

Philippines	70–82	Greece
Scoring by quarter: 10–20, 17–17, 18–21, 25–24
Pts: Blatche 21; Rebs: Blatche 14; Asts: Alapag 3		Pts: Printezis 25; Rebs: Bourousis 10; Asts: Papanikolaou 4

Palacio Municipal de Deportes San Pablo, Seville
Attendance: 5,554
Referees: Luigi Lamonica (ITA), Mohammad Al-Amiri (KUW), Stephen Seibel (CAN)

== 1 September ==
=== Croatia vs. Senegal ===
This was the first meeting between Croatia and Senegal.

1 September 2014
12:30

Boxscore

Croatia	75–77	Senegal
Scoring by quarter: 16–18, 16–23, 20–18, 23–18
Pts: Bogdanović, Šarić 15; Rebs: Tomić 9 Asts: Šarić 4		Pts: Dieng 27; Rebs: Dieng 8 Asts: D'Almeida 5

Palacio Municipal de Deportes San Pablo, Seville
Attendance: 4,380
Referees: Michael Aylen (AUS), Mohammad Al-Amiri (KUW), Stephen Seibel (CAN)

=== Argentina vs. Philippines ===
This was the second meeting between Argentina and the Philippines in the World Cup. Argentina won the first meeting in the 1974 FIBA World Championship.

1 September 2014
17:30

Boxscore

Argentina	85–81	Philippines
Scoring by quarter: 22–25, 21–13, 28–23, 14–20
Pts: Scola 19; Rebs: Mata 9 Asts: Scola, Campazzo 4		Pts: de Ocampo 18; Rebs: Blatche 15; Asts: Castro, Alapag 2

Palacio Municipal de Deportes San Pablo, Seville
Attendance: 6,071
Referees: Ilija Belošević (SRB), Juan González (ESP), Carlos Julio (ANG)

=== Puerto Rico vs. Greece ===
This was the second meeting between Puerto Rico and Greece in the World Cup. Greece won the two games, including their latest match-up in the 2010 FIBA World Championship.

1 September 2014
20:00

Boxscore

Puerto Rico	79–90	Greece
Scoring by quarter: 19–20, 14–21, 19–27, 27–22
Pts: Balkman 23; Rebs: Franklin 6 Asts: Barea 5		Pts: Zisis 19; Rebs: Kaimakoglou 11; Asts: Bourousis 6

Palacio Municipal de Deportes San Pablo, Seville
Attendance: 6,071
Referees: Luigi Lamonica (ITA), José Reyes (MEX), Fernando Rocha (POR)

== 3 September ==
=== Philippines vs. Puerto Rico ===
This was the fourth meeting between the Philippines and Puerto Rico in the World Cup. Puerto Rico won the first meeting in the 1959 FIBA World Championship. In their last competitive game, the Puerto Ricans defeated the Filipinos at the 1972 Olympics.

3 September 2014
13:30

Boxscore

Philippines	73–77	Puerto Rico
Scoring by quarter: 25–13, 19–26, 13–22, 16–16
Pts: Blatche 25; Rebs: Blatche 14; Asts: de Ocampo 3		Pts: Barea 30; Rebs: Franklin 9 Asts: Rivera 3

Palacio Municipal de Deportes San Pablo, Seville
Attendance: 4,998
Referees: José Reyes (MEX), Juan González (ESP), Carlos Julio (ANG)

=== Senegal vs. Argentina ===
This was the first competitive game between Senegal and Argentina.

3 September 2014
17:30

Boxscore

Senegal	46–81	Argentina
Scoring by quarter: 15–20, 9–21, 14–12, 8–28
Pts: Dieng 11; Rebs: Dieng 8 Asts: D'Almeida 4		Pts: Scola 22; Rebs: Scola 14; Asts: Laprovíttola 6

Palacio Municipal de Deportes San Pablo, Seville
Attendance: 5,725
Referees: Ilija Belošević (SRB), Mohammad Al-Amiri (KUW), Stephen Seibel (CAN)

=== Greece vs. Croatia ===
This was the third meeting between Greece and Croatia in the World Cup. Croatia won the first two meetings, all in the 1994 FIBA World Championship. Croatia won in the FIBA EuroBasket 2013 in their last competitive game against each other.

3 September 2014
20:00

Boxscore

Greece	76–65	Croatia
Scoring by quarter: 16–14, 20–9, 15–16, 25–26
Pts: Papanikolaou, Kaimakoglou 14; Rebs: Bourousis 10; Asts: Zisis 10		Pts: Bogdanović 20; Rebs: Tomić 9 Asts: Lafayette 3

Palacio Municipal de Deportes San Pablo, Seville
Attendance: 5,725
Referees: Luigi Lamonica (ITA), Michael Aylen (AUS), Fernando Rocha (POR)

== 4 September ==
=== Senegal vs. Philippines ===
This was the first meeting between Senegal and the Philippines in the World Cup. The Philippines has previously met Senegal twice in the Olympics, winning both games, including their last match-up at the 1972 Olympics.

4 September 2014
14:00

Boxscore

Senegal	79–81 (OT)	Philippines
Scoring by quarter: 19–13, 5–24, 20–12, 20–15, Overtime: 15–17
Pts: Faye 20; Rebs: Dieng 14; Asts: D'Almeida 13		Pts: Blatche, Alapag 18; Rebs: Blatche 14; Asts: Alapag 4

Palacio Municipal de Deportes San Pablo, Seville
Attendance: 5,132
Referees: Ilija Belošević (SRB), Fernando Rocha (POR), Carlos Julio (ANG)

=== Croatia vs. Puerto Rico ===
This was the first meeting between Croatia and Puerto Rico in the World Cup. The two countries previously played at the 2008 Summer Olympic Qualifying Tournament won by Croatia.

4 September 2014
18:00

Boxscore

Croatia	103–82	Puerto Rico
Scoring by quarter: 28–16, 25–20, 31–21, 19–25
Pts: Bogdanović 23; Rebs: Markota, Simon 7 Asts: Ukić 6		Pts: Barea 20; Rebs: Huertas 4 Asts: Rivera 6

Palacio Municipal de Deportes San Pablo, Seville
Attendance: 7,047
Referees: Luigi Lamonica (ITA), Mohammad Al-Amiri (KUW), Stephen Seibel (CAN)

=== Argentina vs. Greece ===
This was the third meeting between Argentina and Greece in the World Cup. Greece won the first two meetings, including their last match-up at the 1990 FIBA World Championship. Argentina won the last competitive game against Greece at the 2008 Olympics.

4 September 2014
22:00

Boxscore

Argentina	71–79	Greece
Scoring by quarter: 16–28, 17–16, 17–20, 21–15
Pts: Scola 17; Rebs: Scola, Campazzo 5 Asts: Campazzo 5		Pts: Calathes 18; Rebs: Bourousis 15; Asts: Zisis 5

Palacio Municipal de Deportes San Pablo, Seville
Attendance: 7,047
Referees: José Reyes (MEX), Michael Aylen (AUS), Juan González (ESP)
