= Mikimoto (company) =

Japanese jewellery company

- Native name: 株式会社ミキモト
- Romanized name: Kabushiki-gaisha Mikimoto
- Type: Privately held company
- Industry: Jewellery
- Founded: March 1899
- Founder: Kokichi Mikimoto
- Headquarters: Tokyo, Japan
- Area served: Worldwide
- Key people: Yasuhiko Hashimoto (president)
- Products: Pearl and gemstone jewellery
- Revenue: ¥51.4 billion (Financial year ended August 2025)
- Number of employees: 655 (August 2025)
- Website: www.mikimoto.com
- Footnotes; Incorporated in May 1949.

Mikimoto, officially K. Mikimoto & Co., Ltd., is a Japanese jewellery company specialising in cultured pearls and other fine jewellery. It was founded by Kōkichi Mikimoto in 1899 after his experiments in pearl cultivation on the coast of Mie Prefecture. Its flagship store is in Ginza, Tokyo, and its overseas retail network extends across Asia, Europe and the United States.

The business developed pearl-farming operations alongside jewellery workshops, bringing cultivation, design, manufacture and retailing within the same group. Its present corporate structure emerged from the 1972 merger of its pearl-production and retail companies.

Mikimoto has also made ceremonial jewellery for the Imperial House of Japan, including early twentieth-century commissions for empresses, jewellery for imperial weddings and, more recently, the tiara and accompanying jewellery made for Princess Kako of Akishino.

== History ==
=== Pearl cultivation and the first shop ===
Kōkichi Mikimoto at work in his home in 1942, aged 84.

Cultivating pearls attached to the inside of a shell had a history predating Mikimoto, including earlier Chinese techniques. The production of a free, spherical cultured pearl, however, required the implantation of a nucleus and living mantle tissue.

In 1888, Kōkichi Mikimoto began raising akoya oysters at Shinmeiura, an inlet of Ago Bay. He subsequently investigated how pearls could be produced deliberately, receiving advice from the zoologist Kakichi Mitsukuri in 1890.

In 1893, Mikimoto obtained five hemispherical pearls from oysters cultivated at Ojima, an island off Toba now known as Mikimoto Pearl Island. The pearls remained attached to the inside of the shell, and therefore differed from the free, round cultured pearls developed later. He applied for a patent in 1894 and received Japanese patent No. 2670 in 1896.

In March 1899, Mikimoto opened the Mikimoto Pearl Store in Ginza. The shop gave the farming business a direct outlet and provided a setting in which pearls could be sold as finished jewellery rather than solely as loose gems.

The Mikimoto Pearl Store in Ginza in 1906.

A jewellery workshop followed in 1907, establishing the manufacturing operation from which the present-day Mikimoto Jewelry Mfg. developed.

=== Round cultured pearls ===
The development of round cultured pearls involved several inventors working in parallel. Mikimoto found round pearls among oysters affected by a red tide in 1905 and continued to develop his own cultivation method. An application he filed in 1907 became Japanese patent No. 13673 in 1908.

At approximately the same time, Tatsuhei Mise and Tōkichi Nishikawa developed methods involving the implantation of a nucleus and a piece of oyster tissue. Their techniques differed in the instruments used and in the way tissue was introduced into the oyster. A 2024 historical review by Shigeru Akamatsu, formerly of the Mikimoto Pearl Research Institute, cautions against assigning the invention of the round cultured pearl to one person, as the surviving patent record reflects several overlapping lines of experimentation.

The Gemological Institute of America dates Mikimoto's adoption of the combined Mise–Nishikawa method to 1916. The resulting technique made the commercial production of round cultured pearls possible and enabled Mikimoto to expand the scale of his business.

=== Overseas expansion and the cultured-pearl controversy ===
Mikimoto opened a London branch in 1913. Located at 14 Clifford Street, off New Bond Street, it placed the business close to London's established jewellery trade. By the end of the decade, round cultured pearls were being offered through the London operation.

After the First World War, the London branch operated from Diamond House in Hatton Garden. Contemporary Mikimoto catalogues place the branch there through 1928, before recording moves to 205 Regent Street in 1929 and subsequently to 119 Regent Street around 1930. Although later company histories described a more extensive retail presence in London, research based on contemporary catalogues, correspondence and surviving promotional material indicates that the European branches functioned primarily as wholesale offices. A retail department in Regent Street is documented for a short period around 1929–1930, but the exact nature of its operations is unclear.

The Mikimoto London branch at 119 Regent Street, around 1930.

The appearance of round cultured pearls in European markets around 1920 provoked opposition from parts of the natural-pearl trade. Dealers feared that a more plentiful supply would undermine prices, and some sought to have cultured pearls treated as artificial imitations. The controversy concerned not only their commercial description but also the biological nature of the pearl material.

The British zoologist Henry Lyster Jameson and the French biologist Louis Boutan concluded that, in respect of their nacre, cultured and natural pearls were not fundamentally different. Their findings helped challenge the claim that a pearl produced with human intervention was equivalent to an artificial imitation.

In France, Mikimoto initially relied on the Pohl firm as its local agent. Lucien Pohl became the plaintiff in legal proceedings against opposition to cultured pearls in the French jewellery trade, commonly referred to in Japanese histories as the “Paris pearl trial”. The proceedings ended favourably in 1924 and helped establish the commercial standing of cultured pearls in Europe.

Mikimoto did not establish its own Paris branch until October 1928, when it opened at 7 Boulevard Haussmann. The branch later moved to 34 Rue Drouot. Contemporary material indicates that it operated from office premises rather than as the type of street-front retail shop depicted in some later company histories.

=== War, reconstruction and corporate reorganisation ===
Mikimoto also sought to distinguish its products by quality. In 1932, the company publicly burned inferior pearls outside the Kobe Chamber of Commerce.

Its manufacturing operation suffered during the Second World War. The factory was destroyed and closed in 1945, and a temporary office was established in Shibuya. Production subsequently resumed at a factory in Tsukiji, followed by the opening of another factory in Meguro.

In 1949, the business was reorganised into two incorporated companies: one responsible for pearl cultivation and processing, and the other for retail, wholesale and export sales. These companies merged on 1 December 1972 under the name K. Mikimoto & Co., Ltd.

A 1954 Mikimoto Pearl Store advertisement photographed by Kenji Itō.

A separate tourism business developed around the original cultivation site at Toba. In 1951, Yūgen-gaisha Mikimoto Shinju-ga-shima was established and Ojima was opened to visitors. The operating company was renamed Yūgen-gaisha Mikimoto Shinju-shima in 1971 and reorganised as a kabushiki gaisha in 1980.

The jewellery workshop became a separate company in 1961 and adopted the name Mikimoto Jewelry Mfg. in 1981. In 1985, the Japan Patent Office selected Kōkichi Mikimoto as one of Japan's ten great inventors to mark the centenary of the promulgation of the Patent Monopoly Ordinance.

=== Later expansion ===
In 1957, Mikimoto donated a crown for the Cherry Blossom Queen at the cherry-blossom festival in Washington, D.C. The company opened a store on New York's Fifth Avenue in 1975 and a London store in 1995.

In 2002, it made and donated the Mikimoto Crown for use by the Miss Universe pageant. In 2007, the group established Mikimoto Hakata Pearl Cultivation in Fukuoka Prefecture and began pearl-farming operations there.

Mikimoto's later development included collaborations outside the traditional fine-jewellery market. A collection with Comme des Garçons appeared in 2020, followed by a collaboration with Chrome Hearts in 2024. In a 2025 interview, then executive vice-president Yasuhiko Hashimoto described these projects as part of an effort to reach younger customers and broaden the audience for pearl jewellery, including men.

The company's Tokyo premises also changed. Its rebuilt Ginza flagship was completed in 2017, while a new building in Minamisuna, Kōtō, brought together some Mikimoto office functions and the headquarters and factory of Mikimoto Jewelry Mfg. in April 2024.

== Jewellery for the Japanese imperial family ==
=== Early commissions and craftsmanship ===
Mikimoto's work for the imperial household included the repair of existing jewellery as well as the manufacture of new pieces. According to its centennial history, the company received a commission in 1906 to repair jewellery belonging to Empress Shōken, including a tiara, necklace and breast ornament, through the Ministry of the Imperial Household.

These commissions coincided with the development of the company's fine-jewellery workshop. Its craftspeople combined Japanese metalworking skills with European jewellery-making techniques, including pierced settings, decorative borders and increasingly elaborate stone setting. Platinum became an important material in this work.

In 1915, Mikimoto made an official breast ornament for Empress Teimei in connection with the enthronement of Emperor Taishō. The company history describes it as the workshop's first major imperial commission and identifies separate specialists responsible for its design, metalwork, stone setting and finishing.

In 1917, Mikimoto made an official ceremonial crown for the empress. Mikimoto's history describes the commission as a crown for imperial ceremonial use, while an Imperial Household Agency inventory classifies the associated item among the empress's formal jewellery as “crown (chrysanthemum type)” (御冠（菊型）).

=== The 1923 bridal commission and court appointment ===
Mikimoto was commissioned to make jewellery for Princess Nagako, later Empress Kōjun, ahead of her marriage to Crown Prince Hirohito, later Emperor Shōwa. Work was interrupted by the 1923 Great Kantō earthquake, which also caused the wedding to be postponed until January 1924. According to the company's account, the jewellery survived the disaster, although damage to its premises forced production to be reorganised. Work resumed at the surviving factory, and the bridal tiara and breast ornaments were delivered in December 1923.

On 12 April 1924, the company was appointed a supplier to the Ministry of the Imperial Household. The appointment followed the bridal commission rather than marking the beginning of its work for the imperial court.

Further commissions came from other branches of the imperial family. For the marriage of Prince Chichibu on 28 September 1928, the Imperial Household commissioned Mikimoto to make a tiara, a pendant that could also be worn as a brooch, a bracelet and other jewellery for the prince's bride. Similar commissions followed for the marriage of Prince Takamatsu on 4 February 1930, including a tiara and a pendant-brooch for his bride.

In 1936, when Prince and Princess Chichibu travelled to Britain for the coronation of George VI, Mikimoto was again commissioned to make a tiara and a pendant-brooch for the princess.

=== Post-war imperial weddings ===
Mikimoto continued making imperial jewellery after the war. For the 1959 marriage of Crown Prince Akihito and Michiko Shōda, it made a bridal tiara, breast ornaments and other jewellery.

Its centennial history records further commissions for the marriages of Prince Hitachi in 1964, Prince Tomohito of Mikasa in 1980 and Prince Takamado in 1984. It also records the manufacture of a tiara and breast ornaments for Princess Sayako, now Sayako Kuroda, in 1988.

The same history lists jewellery for the 1990 marriage of Prince Akishino and Kiko Kawashima, and for the 1993 marriage of Crown Prince Naruhito and Masako Owada. These commissions were undertaken by specialist craftspeople within the manufacturing company, which describes the work as a continuation of skills developed through its earlier court commissions.

=== Modern tiara procurement ===
More recent commissions have been documented through public procurement records and news reporting. In a 2010 review of a contract for jewellery for Princess Mako, now Mako Komuro, the Imperial Household Agency explained that it had previously contracted directly with Mikimoto because it regarded the company as the only manufacturer capable of meeting its requirements. After determining that Wako could also undertake the work, the agency adopted invited competitive bidding between the two companies. Wako received the 2010 contract for Princess Mako's tiara and accompanying jewellery, valued at ¥28.56 million.

In June 2013, Mikimoto was selected to make a tiara and accompanying jewellery for Princess Kako ahead of her twentieth birthday in December 2014. Five companies submitted proposals, which were assessed through a design competition. The resulting five-piece set comprised a tiara, necklace, earrings, bracelet and a brooch for fastening the insignia of an order. The total contract value was ¥27.93 million and covered the complete set, not the tiara alone.

=== Gallery ===
Crown Princess Nagako (later Empress Kōjun) wearing a Mikimoto tiara around the time of her marriage in 1924.

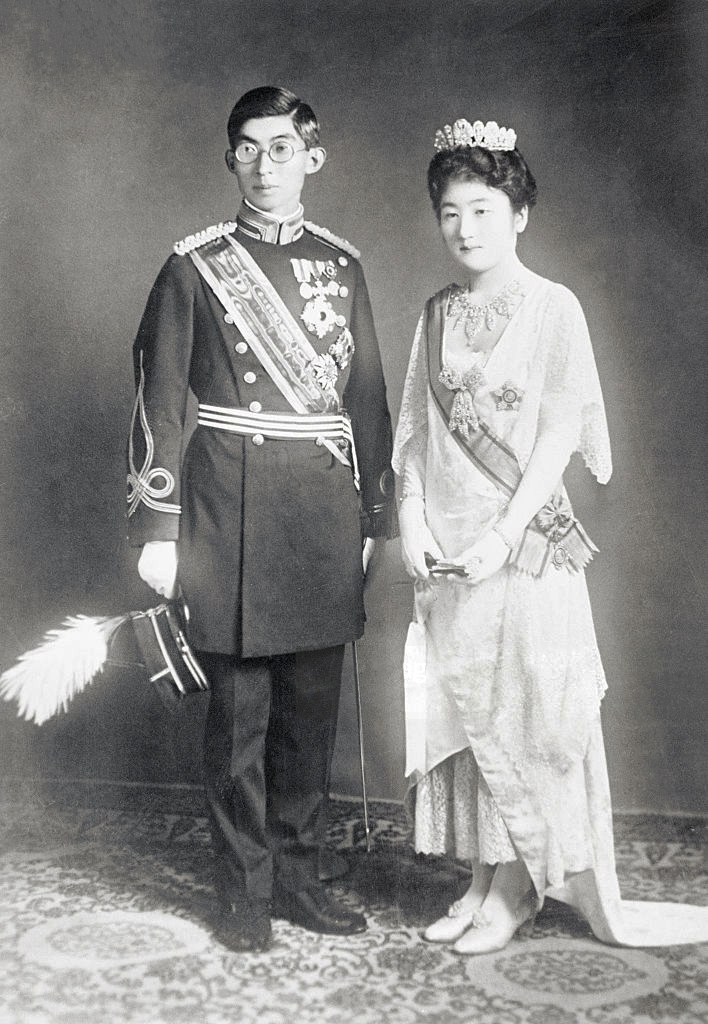
Princess Chichibu wearing a Mikimoto tiara at her wedding to Prince Chichibu on 28 September 1928.

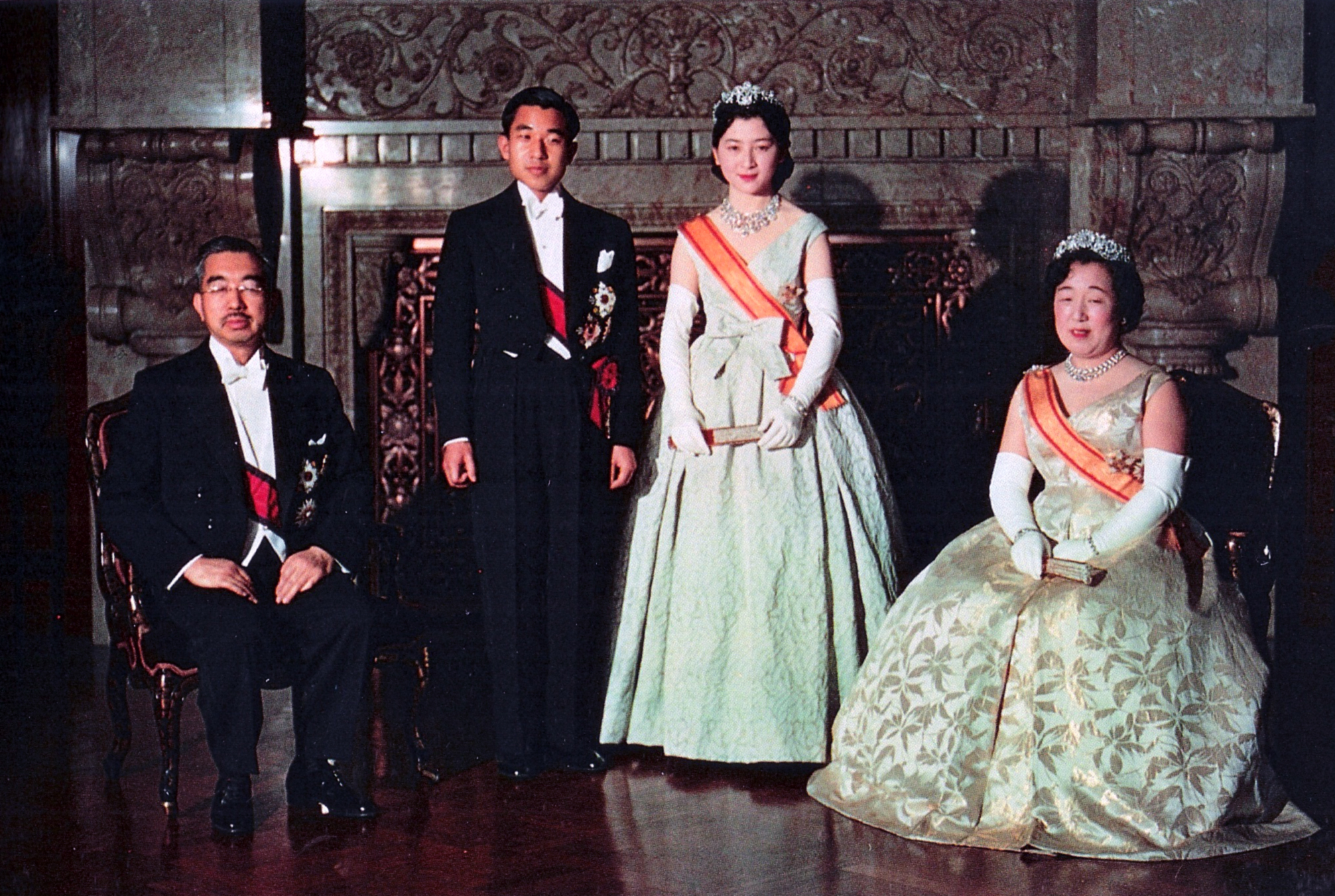
Crown Princess Michiko wearing a Mikimoto tiara at her wedding to Crown Prince Akihito in 1959; Empress Kōjun wears the chrysanthemum-type ceremonial crown.

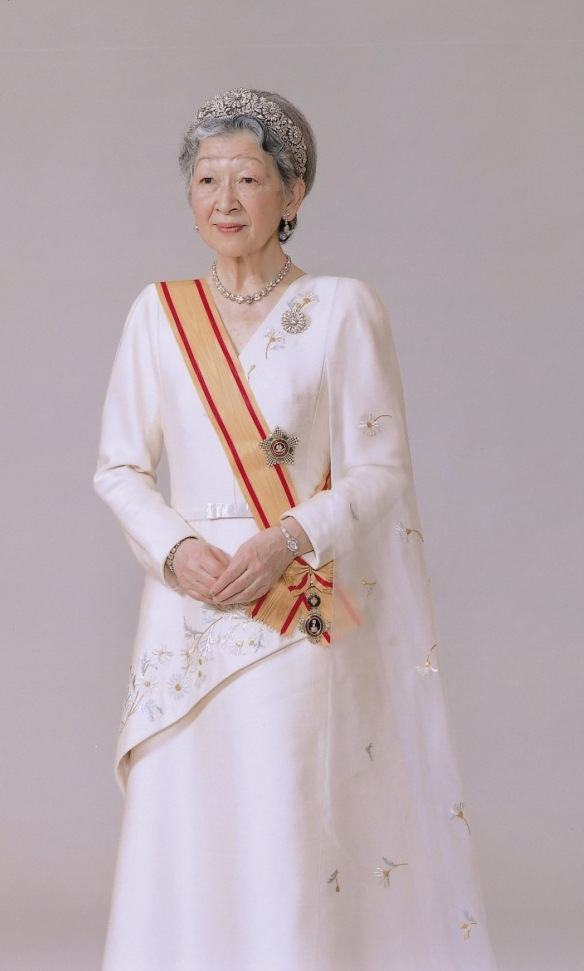
Empress Michiko wearing the chrysanthemum-type ceremonial crown.

== Bibliography ==
- Akamatsu, Shigeru (2024). 養殖真珠の誕生を検証する [Examining the origins of cultured pearls]. 宝石学会誌 (in Japanese). 38 (4): 44–47. doi:10.14915/gsjapan.38.4_44.
- Japan Patent Office (2015). 日本の十大発明家―偉大な発明の数々 [Japan's ten great inventors and their inventions] (in Japanese). Japan Patent Office.
- Koizuka, Fumihiro (February 1985). 奇跡の貴金属プラチナ [Platinum: The miraculous precious metal] (in Japanese). Mainichi Shimbunsha.
- Mikimoto (July 1994). 御木本真珠発明100年史 [A hundred-year history of Mikimoto's invention of cultured pearls] (in Japanese). Mikimoto.
- Ototake, Hiroshi (1977). 養殖真珠の発展過程―4― [Historical development of the cultured pearl industry in Japan, part 4]. 宝石学会誌 (in Japanese). 4 (1): 13–15. doi:10.14915/gsjapan.4.1_13.
- Sugibayashi, Hirohito (2022). 御木本の戦前のグローバル・チャネルの形成過程―国内と海外の市場活動の展開― [The formation of Mikimoto's pre-war global distribution channels: The development of domestic and overseas market activities] (PDF) (Doctoral dissertation) (in Japanese). Kobe University.
