= 2023 FIBA Basketball World Cup seeding =

The draw for the 2023 FIBA Basketball World Cup took place on 29 April 2023 at the Araneta Coliseum in Quezon City, Philippines. It set the stage for the round-robin group stage in the Philippines, Japan, and Indonesia, where the World Cup will be played.

The 32 teams were seeded into eight pots of four for the draw. As hosts of the final phase, the Philippines were placed in Pot 1, alongside the FIBA World Rankings' three highest-ranked teams. The 28 other teams, including co-host Japan, were placed in Pots 2 to 8, also according to their world ranking. The draw sequence began with Pot 1 and ended with Pot 8. Teams from Pots 1, 3, 5, and 7 were drawn into Groups A, C, E and G, while teams from Pots 2, 4, 6 and 8 were drawn into Groups B, D, F and H. A competition number was drawn from each team to determine its position in the group and the order of games in each group.

Despite being one of the three hosts, Indonesia was not able to qualify for the tournament as they neither advanced to the second round of the Asian Qualifiers nor met FIBA's condition of finishing as quarterfinalists at the 2022 FIBA Asia Cup, which they hosted, marking this the first World Cup where a host nation has not qualified.

== Personnel involved ==
The 32 nations participating in the 2023 World Cup were drawn into eight groups of four. The two qualified host teams, the Philippines and Japan, alongside the three preferred teams each host country selected to host, the United States chosen by the Philippines, Slovenia chosen by Japan, and Canada chosen by Indonesia, were drawn to their respective groups first before drawing the other teams. As such, the Philippines was allocated to Group A, while Japan was allocated to Group E. The United States, Slovenia, and Canada were assigned Group C, Group F, and Group H, respectively.

The draw was led by FIBA Basketball World Cup 2023 Global Ambassador Luis Scola (Argentina) and 2011 NBA champion Dirk Nowitzki (Germany), along with Local Ambassadors from the three host nations: 2014 Philippine World Cup team member LA Tenorio and Miss Universe 2018 Catriona Gray (Philippines), former national team member and current president of Levanga Hokkaido Takehiko Orimo (Japan), and actor Raffi Ahmad (Indonesia).

== Seedings ==
Teams were seeded using the February 2023 FIBA World Rankings (shown in parentheses), which were published on 27 February 2023, after the sixth window of the 2023 FIBA Basketball World Cup qualification process.

The highest-ranked team not to qualify for the World Cup, and also the only team from the top 10 in the rankings not to qualify, was fourth-ranked Argentina, who won the silver medal at the 2019 FIBA Basketball World Cup in China.

Pot 1	Pot 2	Pot 3	Pot 4
Philippines (40) (H); Spain (1); United States (2); Australia (3)	France (5); Serbia (6); Slovenia (7); Lithuania (8)	Greece (9); Italy (10); Germany (11); Brazil (13)	Canada (15); Venezuela (17); Montenegro (18); Puerto Rico (20)
Pot 5	Pot 6	Pot 7	Pot 8
Iran (22); Dominican Republic (23); Finland (24); New Zealand (26)	China (27); Latvia (29); Mexico (31); Georgia (32)	Jordan (33); Japan (36) (H); Angola (41); Ivory Coast (42)	Lebanon (43); Egypt (55); South Sudan (62); Cape Verde (64)

Notes

- H : Hosts

== Final draw ==
The eight groups were formed randomly, selecting one team from each of the eight pots, and allocating them to an assigned group depending on which pot the team is located. Two teams from the same confederation cannot be placed into the same group, with the exception of teams from Europe, where a minimum of one team but no more than two teams could be in the same group. Groups A-D will play in the Philippines, with Groups A and B playing at the Araneta Coliseum in Quezon City, while Groups C and D will play at the Mall of Asia Arena in Pasay. Groups E and F will be staged at the Okinawa Arena in Okinawa City, and the Indonesia Arena in Jakarta will host Groups G and H.

Group A (Manila)	Group B (Manila)	Group C (Manila)	Group D (Manila)
Angola	South Sudan	United States	Egypt
Dominican Republic	Serbia	Jordan	Mexico
Philippines	China	Greece	Montenegro
Italy	Puerto Rico	New Zealand	Lithuania
Group E (Okinawa)	Group F (Okinawa)	Group G (Jakarta)	Group H (Jakarta)
Germany	Slovenia	Iran	Canada
Finland	Cape Verde	Spain	Latvia
Australia	Georgia	Ivory Coast	Lebanon
Japan	Venezuela	Brazil	France

== See also ==
- 2019 FIBA Basketball World Cup seeding
