= Miss World Philippines 2016 =

6th Miss World Philippines pageant

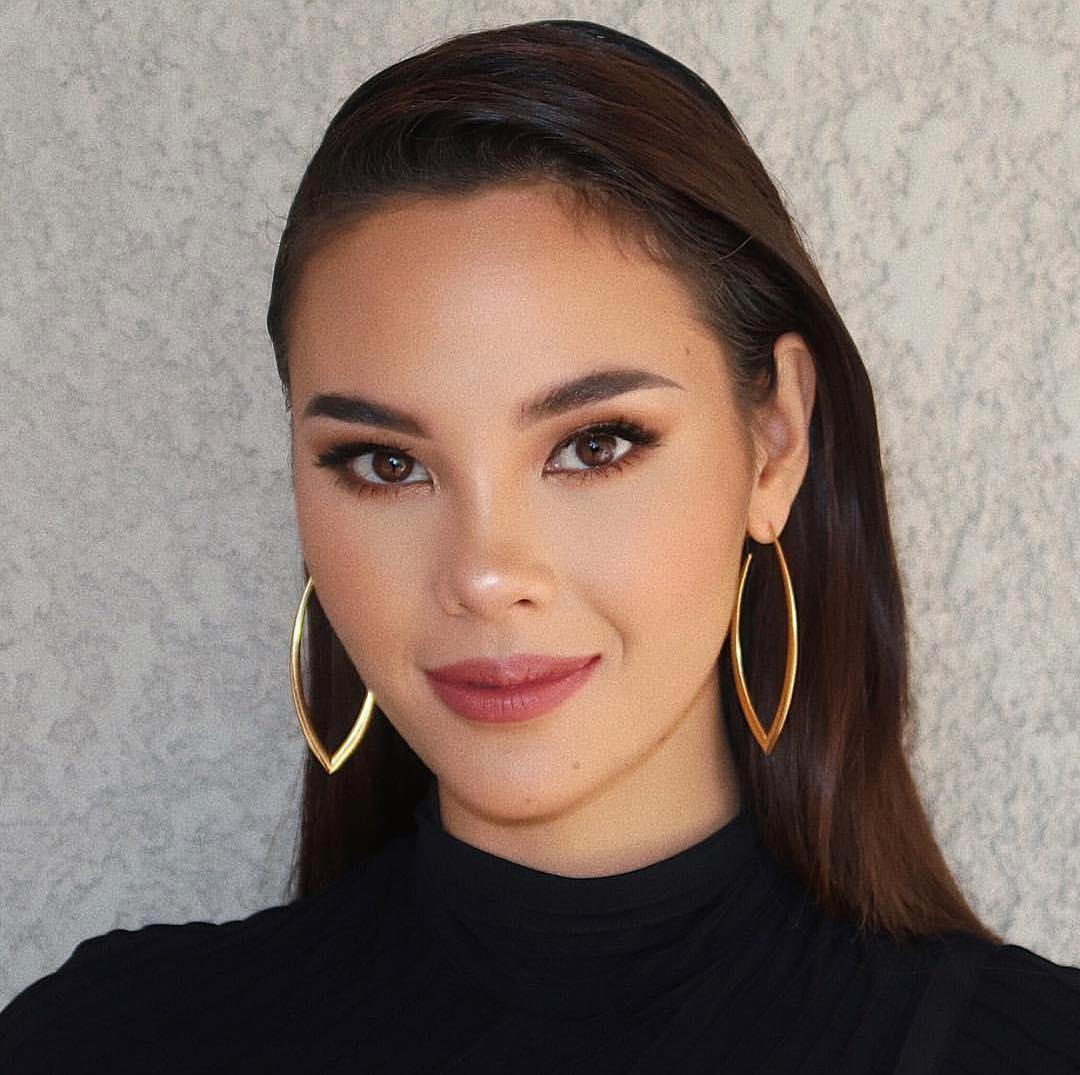
- Catriona Gray
- Date: October 2, 2016
- Presenters: Richard Gutierrez; Gwendoline Ruais; Queenierich Rehman
- Venue: Manila Hotel, Manila, Philippines
- Broadcaster: GMA Network
- Entrants: 24
- Placements: 12
- Winner: Catriona Gray; Albay
- Congeniality: Sandra Lemonon, Pasig
- Photogenic: Sandra Lemonon, Pasig

Miss World Philippines 2016 was the sixth Miss World Philippines pageant, held at the Manila Hotel in Manila, Philippines, on October 2, 2016.

Hillarie Parungao crowned Catriona Gray as her successor at the end of the event. Gray represented the Philippines at Miss World 2016 in Washington, D.C., United States and finished in the top five.

== Results ==
=== Placements ===
Color keys

- The contestant was a finalist in an international pageant.

Placement	Contestant	International Placement
Miss World Philippines 2016	#13 – Catriona Elisa Gray	Top 5 – Miss World 2016
1st Princess	#5 – Arienne Louise Calingo	
2md Princess	#18 – Ivanna Kamil Pacis	
3rd Princess	#21 – Marah Muñoz	
4th Princess	#8 – Sandra Lemonon	
Top 12	#2 – Shenna Mae Zaldivar; #4 – Alyanna Cagandahan; #7 – Sarah Margarette Joson; #10 – Kristine Gaile Lopez; #12 – Arah Salientes; #23 – Ralph Lauren Asuncion; #24 – Yuri Caunca	

== Contestants ==
Twenty-four contestants competed for the title.

No.	Contestant	Age	Hometown
1	Maria Paula Adda Prose	23	Cagayan
2	Shenna Mae Zaldivar	19	Dapitan
3	Rossette Joyce Tayam	21	Olongapo
4	Alyanna Cagandahan	23	Laguna
5	Arienne Louise Calingo	24	Angeles
6	Ivy Meerry Enriquez	20	Mariveles
7	Sarah Margarette Joson	23	Manila
8	Sandra Lemonon	21	Pasig
9	Jan Helen Villanueva	24	Bulacan
10	Kristine Gaile Lopez	22	Hagonoy
11	Shaina Lalaine Sazon	18	Aurora
12	Arah Salientes	20	San Fernando
13	Catriona Elisa Gray	22	Oas
14	Madeleine Iya Gabrella Uy	18	Mandaluyong
15	Charlene Fontanilla	19	Mandaluyong
16	Roshiel Asingua	20	Cebu City
17	Irina Cortez	21	Makati
18	Ivanna Kamil Pacis	20	Makati
19	Vinie Camille Quiangco	24	Capiz
20	Quenie Litz Lorenzo	18	Norzagaray
21	Marah Muñoz	23	Parañaque
22	Jane Pactoranan	21	Antipolo
23	Ralph Lauren Asuncion	25	Batangas City
24	Yuri Caunca	19	Las Piñas

== Notes ==
=== Post-pageant notes ===
- Aside from finishing as a finalist at Miss World 2016, Catriona Gray also won the Multimedia challenge. She was also among the top five candidates for Beauty With a Purpose. After Miss World, Gray competed at Binibining Pilipinas 2018 where she was crowned as Binibining Pilipinas Universe 2018. She competed and won at Miss Universe 2018 in Bangkok.
- Sandra Lemonon also competed at Binibining Pilipinas 2018 where she finished as a semi-finalist. Lemonon then competed at the inaugural edition of Miss Universe Philippines where she finished as a semi-finalist.
