= Mayon gown =

Red dress by designer Mak Tumang

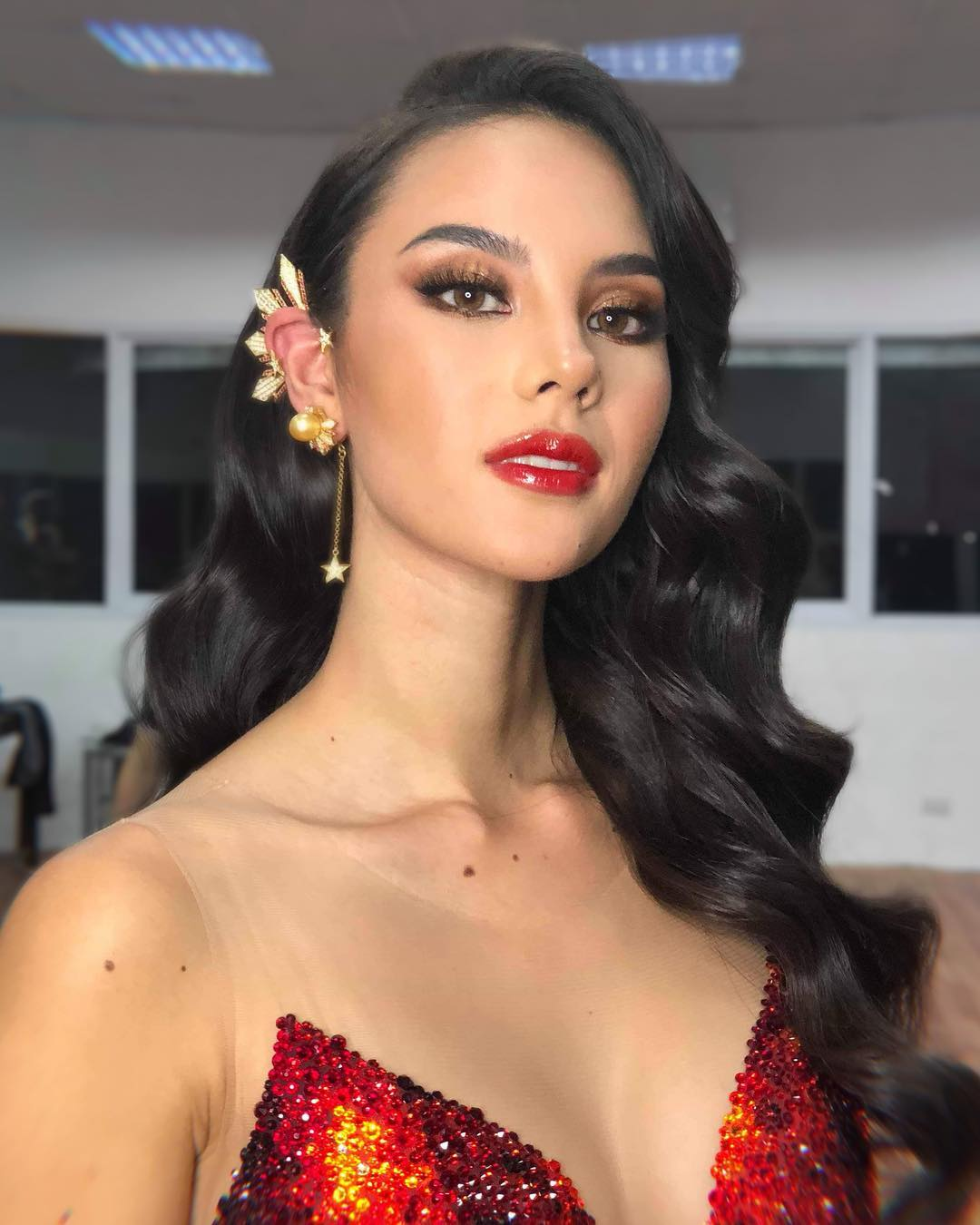
- Designer: Mak Tumang
- Year: 2018
- Type: red, high-slit dress
- Material: tulle

Mayon gown is a red, high-slit dress made by Filipino fashion designer Mak Tumang and worn by Catriona Gray during the evening gown competition in Miss Universe 2018, which she won. The dress is also called Mayon Volcano gown as its design was inspired by Albay's Mayon Volcano, and later the dress became popularly known as the "lava gown" owing to its distinct fiery red to dark red color. It is one of the two well-known dresses Gray wore in the pageant, and it is credited for making Tumang a household name.

== Design ==
The Mayon gown is made of tulle encrusted with Swarovski crystals in 12-toned color palette that ranged from yellow to dark red. Its body-fitting, bare back design features a side cutout and a high slit that "highlighted Gray's legs." The dress, which according to Tumang weighed 10 pounds, was a tribute to Mayon Volcano, a tourist attraction in the province of Albay, the hometown of Gray's mother. In an interview, Gray decided to pick the dress for the beauty contest as her mother dreamed of her winning the Miss Universe crown wearing a red gown.

Planning and sketches were proposed as early as March 2018, just a week after Gray won the Binibining Pilipinas Universe 2018 title, and production started in May. It was one of the seven Philippine-themed dresses presented to Gray, which were inspired by "Filipino arts, culture and literature," and one of the three that were produced by 16 artisans working for 2,712 hours with cost of materials reportedly at P1,025,091.

== Reception ==
The dress was described as stunning when Gray walked down the runway in the evening gown competition of Miss Universe 2018 and has been regarded as iconic. Gray's accessorized the look with a diamond-ruby ear cuff called "Alab at Dangal", which was a homage to the Philippine flag, that featured gold rays, two stars, and one star that dangled at its tip, and a pair of studs made of golden pearls.

In a review that appeared in Time, Ashley Hoffman explained, "Gray also worked in a tribute to the Mayon Volcano of the Philippines with her sparkling crimson gown designed to resemble the swirling red and orange lava that flows down the cone-shaped volcano’s crater." Vogue's Janelle Okwodu commented on the dress, "Onstage at Bangkok’s Impact Arena in Thailand, she wore a fiery custom gown by Filipino designer Mak Tumang, featuring a portrait of the Mayon Volcano rendered in Swarovski crystals. It was the perfect complement to her lava walk, and she gave hosts Steve Harvey and Ashley Graham something to talk about, earning her second supermodel shoutout.

Voltaire E. Tayag of Rappler stated that the dress made Tumang a household name. Additionally, Raoul J. Chee Kee, writing for the Philippine Daily Inquirer, said, "His background may have been in production design, but Mak Tumang will go down in fashion history for dressing the country’s fourth Miss Universe in a gown that mimicked flowing lava... It was the magma-hot evening gown she wore at the pageant proper, however, that is seared in the Filipinos’ collective consciousness."

== Exhibit ==
In December 2018, the Mayon gown was exhibited in SM City Pampanga along with the Ibong Adarna gown that Gray wore during the preliminaries and Sinag gown, which Gray wore when she won Miss Universe Philippines 2018 in the Binibining Pilipinas 2018 pageant. It was also displayed on the exhibit named "The Universe: Celebration of World Class Talent" held at SM Mall of Asia in March 2019. According to Tumang, he plans to establish a museum where the gown will be in permanent exhibition.

== See also ==
- List of individual dresses
