= Catriona Gray =

Filipina beauty pageant titleholder (born 1994)

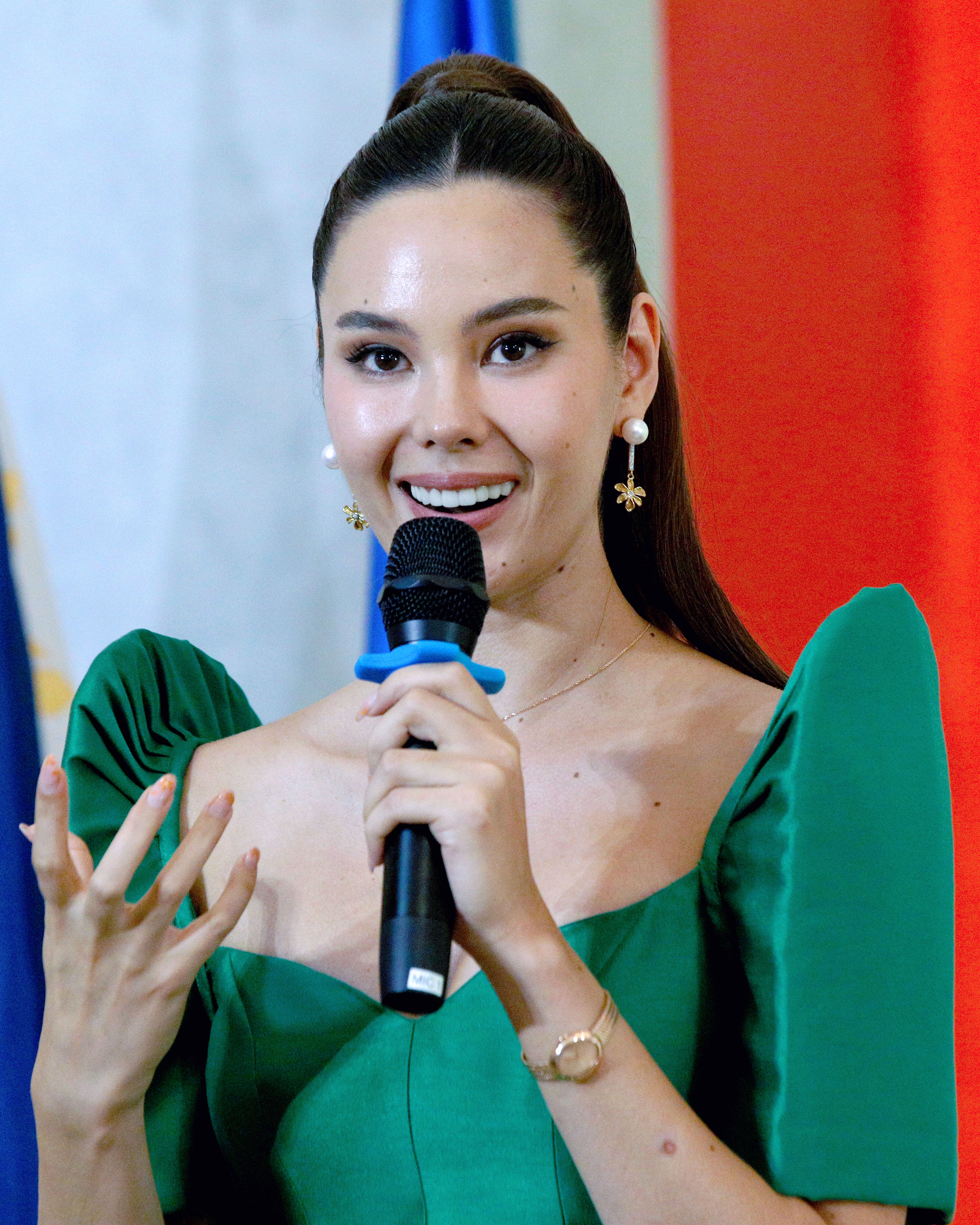
- Gray in 2026
- Born: Catriona Elisa Magnayon Gray; January 6, 1994 (age 32); Cairns, Queensland, Australia
- Citizenship: Australia; Philippines
- Education: Berklee College of Music
- Occupations: Model; singer; actress; media personality
- Height: 5 ft 10 in (178 cm)
- Beauty pageant titleholder
- Title: Miss World Philippines 2016; Miss Universe Philippines 2018; Miss Universe 2018
- Agency: Cornerstone Entertainment
- Years active: 1999–2001; 2006–present
- Major competitions: Miss World Philippines 2016; (Winner); Miss World 2016; (Top 5); Binibining Pilipinas 2018; (Winner – Miss Universe Philippines); Miss Universe 2018; (Winner)

Signature
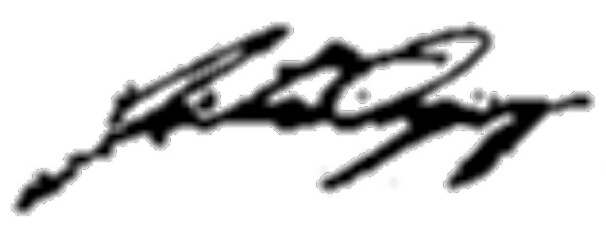

Catriona Elisa Magnayon Gray (English: /ˈkætrɪɔːnəˌ kɑːt-/ KAT-ree-aw-nə, KAHT-; Tagalog: [ˌkaːtɾiˈɔː.na]; born January 6, 1994) is a Filipino model, singer, actress and beauty queen best known for winning Miss Universe 2018. The fourth Filipina to win Miss Universe, Gray was previously crowned Miss World Philippines 2016 and Miss Universe Philippines 2018, and reached the top five at Miss World 2016.

== Early life and education ==
Catriona Elisa Magnayon Gray was born in Cairns, Queensland, Australia, on January 6, 1994, to an Australian father of Scottish descent, Ian Gray, and a Filipina mother, Normita Ragas Magnayon, from Oas, Albay, Philippines. Gray is reportedly named after her paternal grandmother, Catherine Gray, an immigrant to Western Australia from Scotland in 1952. In 1999, Gray won the Little Miss Philippines pageant in Sydney at the age of five.

Gray was a student at Trinity Anglican School in Cairns where she was a house captain and a school chorister. She received a graduate certificate in music theory from Berklee College of Music in Boston, Massachusetts and obtained a certificate in outdoor recreation and a black belt in Choi Kwang-Do martial arts. Furthermore, Gray was lead singer of her school's jazz band; she also starred in local productions of Miss Saigon. After graduating from high school, she moved to Manila where she worked as a commercial model.

== Pageantry ==
=== Miss World Philippines 2016 ===
On September 5, 2016, Gray was announced as one of the 40 candidates competing for the title of Miss World Philippines 2016. The pageant was held on October 2, at the Manila Hotel. Early in the competition, Gray won four special awards—Best in Swimsuit, Best in Evening Gown, Best in Fashion Runway, and Best in Talent—as well as six awards from the pageant's corporate sponsors.

Gray would progress to the top 12 question and answer round she was asked, "When you get up in the morning and look in the mirror, what do you see?". In her answer she recalled how she would reflect on her experiences to further her character.

During the final question and answer round all the five finalists were asked the same question, "Why should you be Miss World Philippines 2016?". Gray emphasized her commitment to her title and her personal advocacy in her answer.

On September 3, 2017, Gray crowned Laura Lehmann as her successor at the Miss World Philippines 2017 pageant.

=== Miss World 2016 ===
After winning the national competition, Gray competed at Miss World 2016 held in MGM National Harbor, in Oxon Hill, Maryland, United States. In pre-pageant contests, Gray won the Multimedia Award, was second in the Talent Award, and reached the top five for the Beauty with a Purpose project.

During the question and answer portion in the pageant, she was asked by the reigning Miss World 2015 Mireia Lalaguna, "Which qualities do you think it will take to wear my crown?". She would state "bravery" as the quality necessary for the title.

Gray went on to finish as a top five finalist. Stephanie Del Valle of Puerto Rico won the said pageant.

=== Binibining Pilipinas 2018 ===
On January 8, 2018, Gray submitted her application for Binibining Pilipinas 2018. On January 16, she was confirmed as one of the 40 candidates competing for the six national titles contested in the pageant.

During the national costume competition on March 3, Gray wore a Mindanao-inspired golden princess gown designed by Jearson Demavivas in honor of Muslim women affected by the Siege of Marawi the previous year. She was announced as one of the ten finalists for the Best in National Costume Award on March 9.

The pageant was held on March 18, at the Araneta Coliseum. Gray won five special awards: Best in National Costume, Best in Swimsuit, Best in Evening Gown, and two awards from the pageant's sponsors. She also obtained two popularity contest prizes.

Gray progressed to the question and answer round, where United States Ambassador to the Philippines Sung Kim asked the following: "After the devastating war—Marawi is now on its way to recovery, what will be your message to the young women of Marawi?". Gray would state the following:

My answer and my message to the women is to be strong. As women, we're the head of the household and we have amazing influence, not only in our own families, as mothers, sisters and friends, but also in our community. If we could get the women to stay strong and be that image of strength for the children and the people around them, then once the rebuilding is complete and is underway, the morale of the community will stay strong and high.

Gray would go on to win the pageant as Miss Universe Philippines 2018, being crowned by her predecessor Rachel Peters. With her victory, Gray became the first Filipino to represent the country in both the Miss World and Miss Universe competitions, and the second to represent the Philippines in two major international pageants, the first being Carlene Aguilar in 2005.

On June 9, 2019, Gray crowned Gazini Ganados as her successor at the Binibining Pilipinas 2019 pageant.

=== Miss Universe 2018 ===
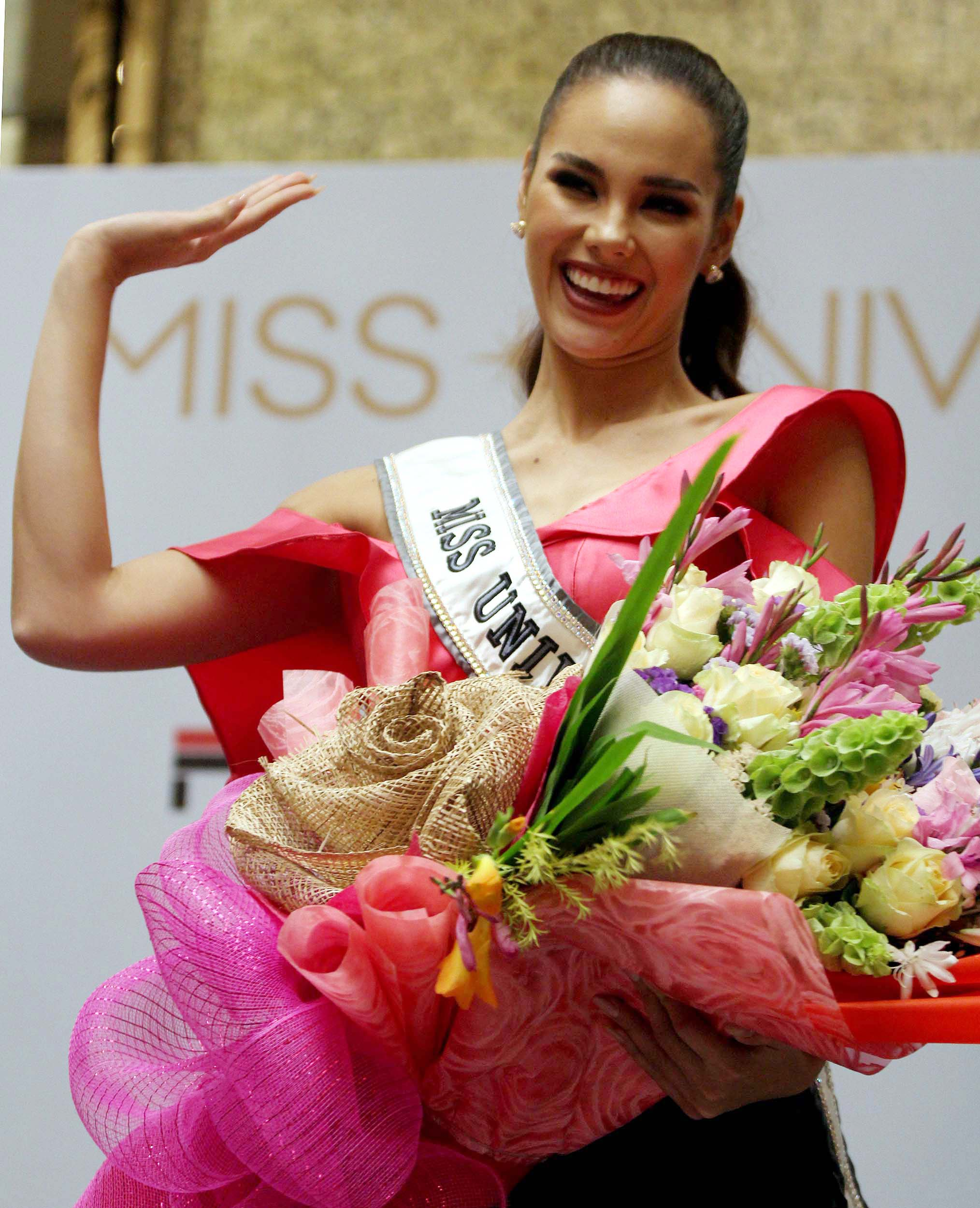
Gray at a charity event in December 2018

As Miss Universe Philippines 2018, Gray represented the Philippines at Miss Universe 2018.

During the national costume show presentation on December 10, Gray wore a beaded tribal suit featuring the indigenous tribes of the ancient pagan Filipinos, alongside an oversized Parol painted lantern pulled by a roller device. The costume was accompanied by a pre-Christian Shamanic dance of the historical Babaylan paganism. The costume gained both praise and criticism, due to the perceived difficulty of walking and the failure of LEDs to function. Gray cited her scoliosis for such issues.

In the pageant's preliminary contest, Gray did a slow-motion walk, billed as the "lava walk", on the ramp in the swimwear competition wearing a pink swimsuit, which was praised by supermodels Tyra Banks and Ashley Graham, fashion commentators and Internet viewers. At the preliminary evening gown competition, she wore Mak Tumang's golden sweetheart gown with a thigh-high slit inspired by the Ibong Adarna and the Mikimoto crown.

The pageant was held on December 17 at the Impact Arena, Muang Thong Thani, in Thailand. At the beginning of the competition, Gray advanced to Top 20. During the opening statement segment, Gray recalled her experiences in working with a non-profit organization.

Gray advanced to the top 10. She wore a pink Sirivannavari bikini and a cape with gold-winged shoulder straps at the swimsuit competition. At the evening gown competition, she wore a Mak Tumang design made of tulle encrusted with Swarovski crystals in 12-toned color palette that ranged from yellow to dark red dubbed the Mayon gown. Its body-fitting, bare back design features a side cutout and a high slit that "highlighted Gray's legs". The dress, which according to Tumang weighed 10 pounds, was a tribute to Mayon Volcano, a tourist attraction in the province of Albay, the hometown of Gray's mother. In an interview, Gray decided to pick the gown for the beauty pageant as her mother dreamed of her winning the Miss Universe crown wearing a red dress.

Gray then advanced to top five. During the first question and answer round, Gray was asked by host Steve Harvey, "Canada recently joined Uruguay as the second nation in the world to make marijuana legal. What is your opinion on the legalization of marijuana?" She responded:

"I'm for it being used for medical use, but not so for recreational use. Because I think if people were to argue: Then what about alcohol and cigarettes? Well, everything is good but in moderation."

Gray advanced to the top three. In the final question and answer section, the top three contestants were asked the same question by Harvey: "What is the most important lesson you've learned in your life and how will you apply it to your time as Miss Universe?" She answered:

I work a lot in the slums of Tondo, Manila, and the life there is very... it's poor and it's very sad. And I've always taught myself to look for the beauty in it; to look in the beauty in the faces of the children, and to be grateful. And I would bring this aspect as a Miss Universe to see situations with a silver lining, and to assess where I could give something, where I could provide something as a spokesperson. And this I think if I could also teach people to be grateful, we could have an amazing world where negativity could not grow and foster, and children will have a smile on their faces.

At the end of the event, Gray won the competition and was crowned by her predecessor, Demi-Leigh Nel-Peters of South Africa. She is the fourth Filipino Miss Universe after Gloria Diaz in 1969, Margie Moran in 1973, and Pia Wurtzbach in 2015. In addition, she is the second Biracial Filipina to win the Miss Universe title after Wurtzbach.

==== Reign as Miss Universe 2018 ====
In her capacity as Miss Universe, Gray visited Brazil, Indonesia, Thailand, South Africa, various cities and states across the United States, and the Philippines. She also visited Canada and United Arab Emirates to meet with her pageant sponsors and Filipino supporters.

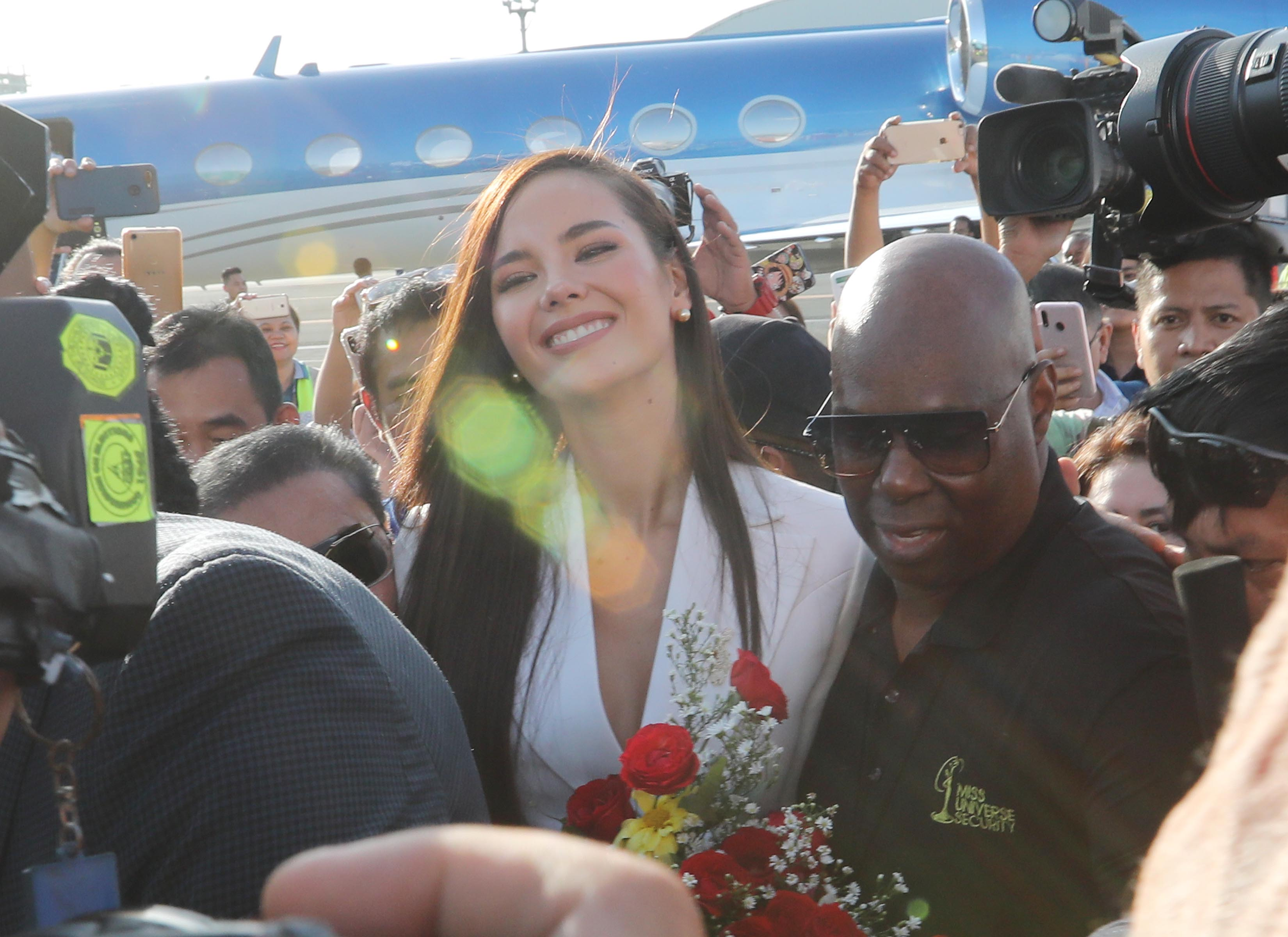
Gray returning to the Philippines after being crowned Miss Universe 2018

On December 20, 2018, Gray made a courtesy call with President Rodrigo Duterte at the Villamor Airbase in Pasay.

On January 22, 2019, Gray traveled to Indonesia to shoot a commercial for C 1000, a vitamin brand in Indonesia.

On February 16, 2019, Gray arrived in the Philippines for a week-long homecoming celebration with visits to the cities of Manila, Makati, Pasay and Quezon City. However, on February 23, 2019, the feather of the Mikimoto Crown replica fell off during her homecoming parade at the Araneta Center. She also made courtesy calls to the Congress of the Philippines, Senate of the Philippines and Malacañang Palace.

On October 17, 2019, Gray attended the 2019 Latin Music Awards at the Dolby Theatre, Hollywood and Highlands in Los Angeles, California, where she presented the "Canción Favorita – Tropical" award for the song "Adicto" to Marc Anthony and Prince Royce.

On December 5, 2019, Gray attended the release of the new Mouawad Crown for the Miss Universe pageant, titled Power of Unity, upon the retirement of the Mikimoto Crown. She crowned Zozibini Tunzi of South Africa as her successor at the 68th Miss Universe pageant.

=== Post-Miss Universe ===
Following her reign, Gray served as a judge on several national qualifying pageants for Miss Universe, having judged for the pageants in Colombia in 2020 and Vietnam in 2022. The latter pageant would receive backlash for introducing her as "Australian by birth" and misspelling her surname throughout the pageant. The national organization would issue an apology for their errors.

== Entertainment career ==
In 2020, Gray was introduced as one of the presenters of the TV5 variety show Sunday Noontime Live!. Gray served as a backstage correspondent of the Miss Universe 2022 finals, alongside Zuri Hall. She reprised her role in 2023. Gray served as a local ambassador for the 2023 FIBA World Cup and participated in the final draw for the tournament.

== Advocacy and issues ==
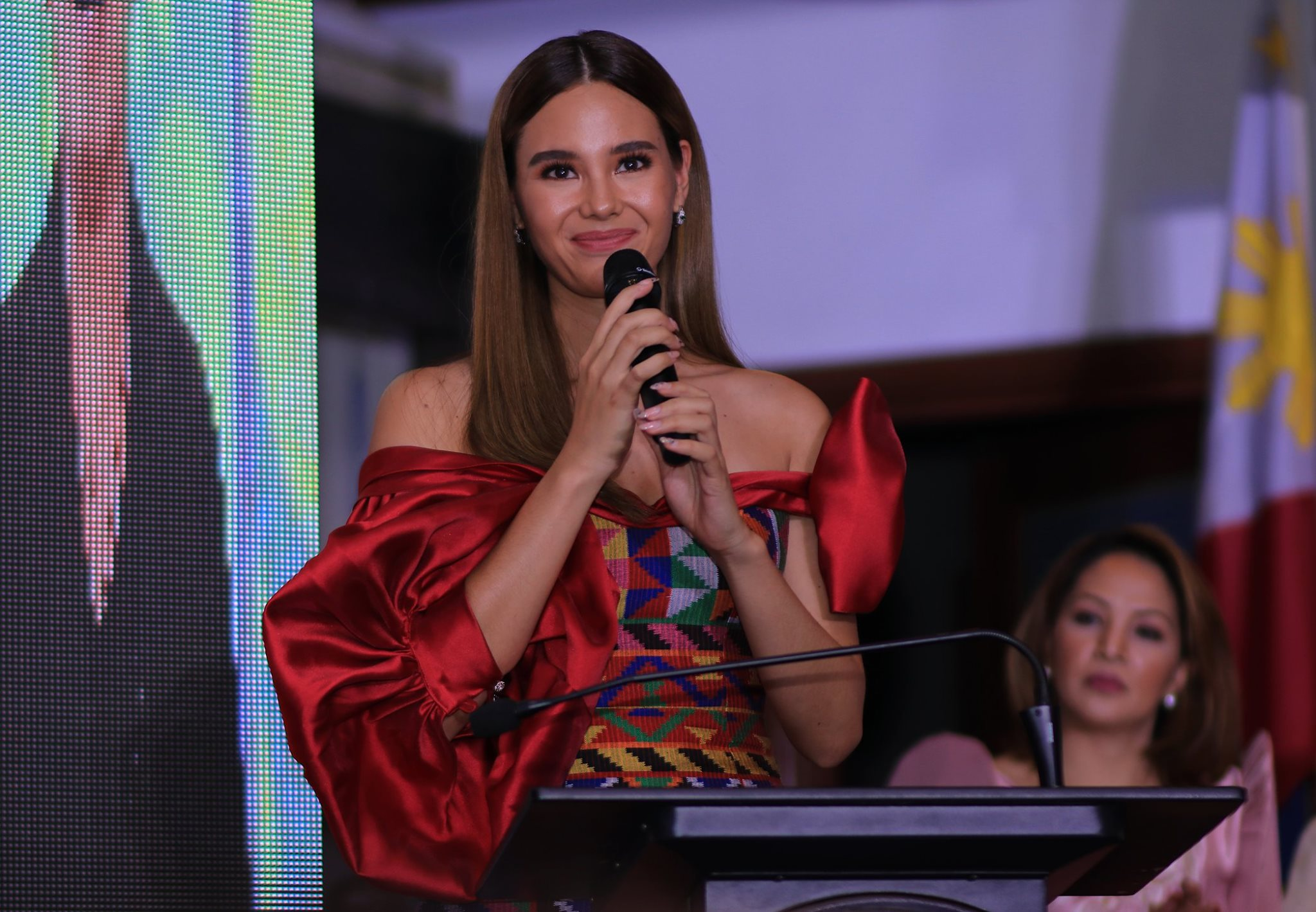
Gray in 2020, delivering a message during the launch of the National Arts Month led by the National Commission for Culture and the Arts.

Gray has advocated for women's rights, indigenous culture conservation, and the "One Town, One Product" (OTOP) project of the Philippines' Department of Trade and Industry. She has continued to pursue her women's rights advocacies despite some incidents when military officials attempted to pressure her into limiting her interactions with certain women's rights groups. Gray has been working with the organization Young Focus Philippines since May 2016. She is also a Love Yourself Philippines and Smile Train ambassador. During the COVID-19 pandemic, Gray served as an ambassador of the Philippine Red Cross.

=== Ambassador for the Arts, and for Indigenous Handicrafts ===
In February 2020, the Philippines' National Commission for Culture and the Arts (NCCA) designated Catriona Gray as the agency's Ambassador for the Arts. Gray was named ambassador yet again in 2021, and was announced as host for "Kultura 101", an NCCA Web Series where Gray said she would "share [her] passion for aspects of Filipino culture whether it be our textiles, our dances, our food."

Gray was also named an Ambassador for Indigenous Handicrafts by the Philippines' Department of Trade and Industry in July 2020.

=== Parlade red-tagging incident ===
Gray responded strongly when she was drawn into the Philippines' Red-tagging issue, due to an incident in October 2020 when AFP Southern Luzon Command commander Antonio Parlade Jr. said that Gray and actress Liza Soberano should not support Gabriela and other rights groups, as fellow celebrity Angel Locsin has done, or they would be drawn into the activities of the Marxist-Leninist-Maoist New People's Army, and risk being killed in a clash with the army just like activists who had allegedly joined that group.

In response, Gray's lawyer Joji Alonso issued a statement saying Parlade's statements were "uncalled for" and affirmed that Gray would continue to advocate for social causes concerning women and will remain "steadfast in her stance that no one should be silenced in sharing their personal stories".

=== Bulgar cyber libel case ===
In September 2024, Gray won a cyber libel case against entertainment editor Janice Navida and writer Melba Llanera, both of whom work for the tabloid Bulgar. The case stemmed from her criminal complaint on July 21, 2020, centering on a falsified photographs of her on social media.

== Personal life ==
Gray was diagnosed with scoliosis at the age of twelve but was not able to secure a back brace treatment for her condition. She revealed her experiences with scoliosis with a video commemorating National Scoliosis Month in 2024. Gray is a Christian and was rebaptized in 2024.

Gray was in a relationship with Filipino-German actor and model Clint Bondad from 2012 to until they separated in 2019. On May 23, 2020, Gray revealed her relationship with Filipino-American actor, Sam Milby. Gray announced her engagement with Milby on February 16, 2023. Milby confirmed their break-up and cancelled engagement in February 2025.

In August 2024, Gray lost her passports and family's belongings in a robbery incident during her vacation in London.

== Impact ==
In March 2022, a wax figure of herself was unveiled in Madame Tussauds Singapore, making her the third Filipino to have such replica made by Madame Tussauds, after Pia Wurtzbach and Manny Pacquiao.

== Discography ==
=== Singles ===
Title	Year	Album	Ref
"We're in this Together"	2018	Non-album single	
"R.Y.F"	2021	Non-album single	
"R.Y.F (Nu Disco)"	2021	Non-album single	
"Angel of Mine" (duet with Jay R)	2021	Non-album single	
"Love Language"	2021	Non-album single	

== Filmography ==
=== Film ===
Year	Title	Role
2026	The Loved One	Nicole

=== Television ===
Year	Title	Notes
2012	@ANCAlerts	Guest
2016	Miss World Philippines 2016	Contestant
2016	Mars	Guest
2016	Tonight with Arnold Clavio	Guest
2016	Miss World 2016	Contestant
2017	Miss World Philippines 2017	Guest
2018	Binibining Pilipinas 2018	Contestant
2018	Mars	Guest
2018	The Bottomline with Boy Abunda	Guest
2018	Miss Universe 2018	Contestant
2018–2020	Tonight with Boy Abunda	Guest
2018–2020	Magandang Buhay	Guest
2018–2020; 2021–present	ASAP	Performer
2019	Good Morning America	Guest
2019	Live with Kelly and Ryan	Guest
2019	Inside Edition	Guest
2019	Celebrity Page	Guest
2019	Good Day New York	Guest
2019	Kapuso Mo, Jessica Soho	Guest
2019	AOL Build Series	Guest
2019	NHL Celebrity Wrap	Guest
2019	Miss Teen USA 2019	Guest
2019	Miss USA 2019	Guest
2019	Binibining Pilipinas 2019	Guest
2019	Miss Universe Thailand 2019	Judge
2019	Miss South Africa 2019	Judge
2019	The Strip Live	Guest
2019	BUILD by Yahoo!	Guest
2019	Good Day New York	Guest
2019	Miss Universe 2019	Guest
2020	It's Showtime	Guest co-host
2020	Lingkod Aksyon	Guest
2020	Headstart with Karen Davila	Guest
2020	Miss Universe Colombia 2020	Judge
2020–2021	Sunday Noontime Live	Host/Performer
2021	Binibining Pilipinas 2021	Host
2021	Supermodel Me: Revolution	Judge
2021	Miss South Africa 2021	Host
2021	It's Showtime	Judge (Segment: Magpasikat)
2022	Top Class	Host
2022	Miss Universe Vietnam 2022	Judge
2022	Binibining Pilipinas 2022	Host
2022	Sing Galing	Guest
2022	It's Showtime	Judge
2022	Global Child	Host
2023	Miss Universe 2022	Backstage correspondent
2023	Miss Universe 2023	Backstage correspondent
2024	Miss Universe 2024	Backstage correspondent

=== Radio ===
Year	Title	Notes
2019	Sway in the Morning	Guest
2019	Hollywood Life	Guest

== Awards and nominations ==
Year	Award-giving body / Organization	Awards	Nominated work	Result	Ref.
2019	50th Guillermo Mendoza Memorial Scholarship Foundation Box Office Entertainment Awards	Global Achievement by a Filipino with Manny Pacquiao	N/A	Won	

== See also ==
- Gloria Diaz
- Margie Moran
- Pia Wurtzbach
- Binibining Pilipinas
- Philippines at Major Beauty Pageants

Awards and achievements
Preceded by (South Africa) Demi-Leigh Nel-Peters	Miss Universe; 2018	Succeeded by (South Africa) Zozibini Tunzi
Preceded by Rachel Peters (Camarines Sur)	Miss Universe Philippines; 2018	Succeeded by Gazini Ganados (Talisay, Cebu)
Preceded by Hillarie Parungao (Nueva Vizcaya)	Miss World Philippines; 2016	Succeeded by Laura Lehmann (Makati)
