= Mak Tumang =

Filipino fashion designer (born 1986)

Mark Aldane "Mak" Velasco Tumang (Tagalog: [ˈmɐɹk bɛˈlɐskɔ tʊˈmɐŋ]; born November 10, 1986) is a Filipino fashion designer. He is popularly known for the Mayon gown and Ibong Adarna gown, dresses that he created for and worn by Catriona Gray where she won the Miss Universe 2018 beauty pageant.

== Personal life ==
Mak Tumang was born as Mark Aldane Velasco Tumang on November 10, 1986 in Pampanga, Philippines. He took up Theater Design and Production Design at De La Salle University-College of St. Benilde and studied a week-long couture embroidery course at Central Saint Martins.

== Fashion ==
=== Background ===
In interviews, Tumang shared that his interest in fashion started through his grandmother's skills in dressmaking, his voluntary design work in stage plays during high school, and experience in creating vestments for religious statues.

In college, he was part of a theater group who introduced him and invited him to attend fashion events. Joining the Philippine Fashion Design Competition in 2007, he submitted an abaca dress as entry. In 2009, he won the Miss Earth Eco-Fashion Design Competition for coral reef-inspired, white abaca dress.

His atelier is located in Mexico, Pampanga.

=== Beauty pageant gowns ===
Gray wore his dress called "Sinag" gown during the Binibining Pilipinas 2018 contest where she won Best in Long Gown special prize.

Tumang became popular for the dresses he made for Catriona Gray for the Miss Universe 2018 pageant and that partly contributed to her success in the said contest. Voltaire Tayag of Rappler commented that the Mayon gown, the dress Gray wore during the evening gown contest, made him a household name. Another creation known as the Ibong Adarna gown, which Gray wore in the preliminary round, received media coverage and became popular on social media.

After the pageant, Gray wore Tumang's sampaguita-inspired dress in her homecoming, "Perla Oriente" gown during a special event at Smart Araneta Coliseum, coral jumpsuit for her Manila press conference and "Alon" gown during a street parade held in Cubao.

Tumang designed Ahtisa Manalo’s gowns for the Miss Universe 2025 preliminary competition. For the preliminary evening gown segment, Manalo wore Tumang’s “Pinctada” gown, a midnight blue piece embellished with gold accents and inspired by the Pinctada Maxima shell, which produces South Sea pearls. Tumang described the silhouette as radiating “sunburst-like rays” in reference to the Miss Universe crown, and the look was completed with Jewelmer jewelry and soft, flowing waves of hair.

For the National Costume competition, Tumang designed “FESTEJADA,” a reinterpretation of the traje de mestiza inspired by Philippine cultural traditions and festivals. The ensemble featured a softly structured camisa and saya made of handmade piña fabric embroidered with abanico and palay motifs. Its most prominent element was a three-tiered skirt composed of more than 65,000 hand-cut petals, incorporating visual references to the Pahiyas Festival of Lucban, Baguio’s Panagbenga Festival, and the parol structures—Tambur, Siku-Siku, and Palimbun—of Pampanga’s Giant Lantern Festival. The look was completed with a filigree-inspired peineta. Tumang conceived the costume as a contemporary presentation of Filipino cultural memory and craftsmanship.

=== Notable dresses ===
Other notable dresses that drew coverage in the media include Maymay Entrata's lava-inspired gown, Kylie Padilla's wedding dress, Imee Marcos' "La Filigrina" gown worn during President Rodrigo Duterte's State of the Nation Address on July 22, 2019, and Jillian Ward's galaxy-inspired gown worn during her Debut on February 25, 2023.

=== Exhibit ===
The Mayon gown, Ibong Adarna gown, and Sinag gown were displayed on an exhibit held at SM City Pampanga in December 2018. From March 16 to 23, his dresses were on an SM Mall of Asia exhibit called Universe: Celebration of World Class Talent.

== Reception ==
Reviewing Tumang's work, Manila Bulletin's Mark Samson wrote, "His masterful play in working with silk tulles, lace appliques, and crystal accents displays sophisticatedly daring details fit for a modern day princess... Each creation from his atelier to fashion runway exhibits holds the signature Mak Tumang qualities–elaborate designs, intricate embroidery, and detailed lacework."
