= 2019 FIBA Basketball World Cup seeding =

The draw for the 2019 FIBA Basketball World Cup took place on 16 March 2019 at Shenzhen Cultural Center in Shenzhen, China. It determined the group in which each of the 32 qualified national teams would play in at the start of the tournament. The teams were divided into eight pots of four, with each team being selected from each pot to assigned groups, depending on the pot one team belongs to.

As hosts, China was placed in Pot 1, alongside the three best-qualified teams as per the February 2019 FIBA World Rankings. The 28 other teams were placed in Pots 2 to 8, also according to their world ranking. The draw sequence began with Pot 1 and ended with Pot 8, with Pots 1,4,5, and 8 feeding Groups A, C, E, and G, while Pots 2,3,6, and 7 filled up Groups B, D, F, and H. A competition number was drawn for each team, which determined its position in the group and the order of games in each group.

== Personnel involved ==
The 32 participating teams were drawn into eight groups of four. As agreed by the Local Organizing Committee, hosts China was drawn in Group A while the defending champions United States was allocated to Group E.

FIBA Basketball World Cup 2019 Global Ambassador Kobe Bryant and Chinese idol singer Yang Chaoyue led the draw ceremony.

== Seeding ==
Teams were seeded using the February 2019 FIBA World Rankings (shown in parentheses), which were published on 26 February 2019, after the sixth window of the 2019 FIBA Basketball World Cup qualification process.

Canada was moved from Pot 5 to Pot 6, switching places with Iran (the best-ranked team from that pot) to avoid having two teams from the Americas in the same group. The highest-ranked team not to qualify for the World Cup was seventh-ranked Slovenia, who participated at the last World Cup in 2014 and were the EuroBasket 2017 champions at the time of the draw. Slovenia would eventually qualify for the 2023 edition.

Pot 1	Pot 2	Pot 3	Pot 4
China (29) (H); United States (1); Spain (2); France (3)	Serbia (4); Argentina (5); Lithuania (6); Greece (8)	Russia (10); Australia (11); Brazil (12); Italy (13)	Puerto Rico (16); Turkey (17); Dominican Republic (18); Venezuela (20)
Pot 5	Pot 6	Pot 7	Pot 8
Germany (22); Czech Republic (24); Poland (25); Iran (27)	Canada (23); Montenegro (28); Philippines (31); South Korea (32)	Nigeria (33); Senegal (37); New Zealand (38); Angola (39)	Japan (48); Jordan (49); Tunisia (51); Ivory Coast (64)

Notes

- H : Hosts

== Final draw ==
The eight groups were formed randomly, selecting one team from each of the eight pots, and allocating them to an assigned group depending on which pot the team is located. Two teams from the same confederation cannot be placed into the same group, with the exception of teams from Europe, where a minimum of one team but no more than two teams could be in the same group. All eight groups were assigned to one of the eight host cities.

Group A (Beijing)	Group B (Wuhan)	Group C (Guangzhou)	Group D (Foshan)
Ivory Coast	Russia	Spain	Angola
Poland	Argentina	Iran	Philippines
Venezuela	South Korea	Puerto Rico	Italy
China	Nigeria	Tunisia	Serbia
Group E (Shanghai)	Group F (Nanjing)	Group G (Shenzhen)	Group H (Dongguan)
Turkey	Greece	Dominican Republic	Canada
Czech Republic	New Zealand	France	Senegal
United States	Brazil	Germany	Lithuania
Japan	Montenegro	Jordan	Australia

== See also ==
- 2014 FIBA Basketball World Cup seeding
