= Mikimoto Pearl Island =

Island in Mie Prefecture, Japan

Coordinates: 34°29′0″N 136°50′49″E

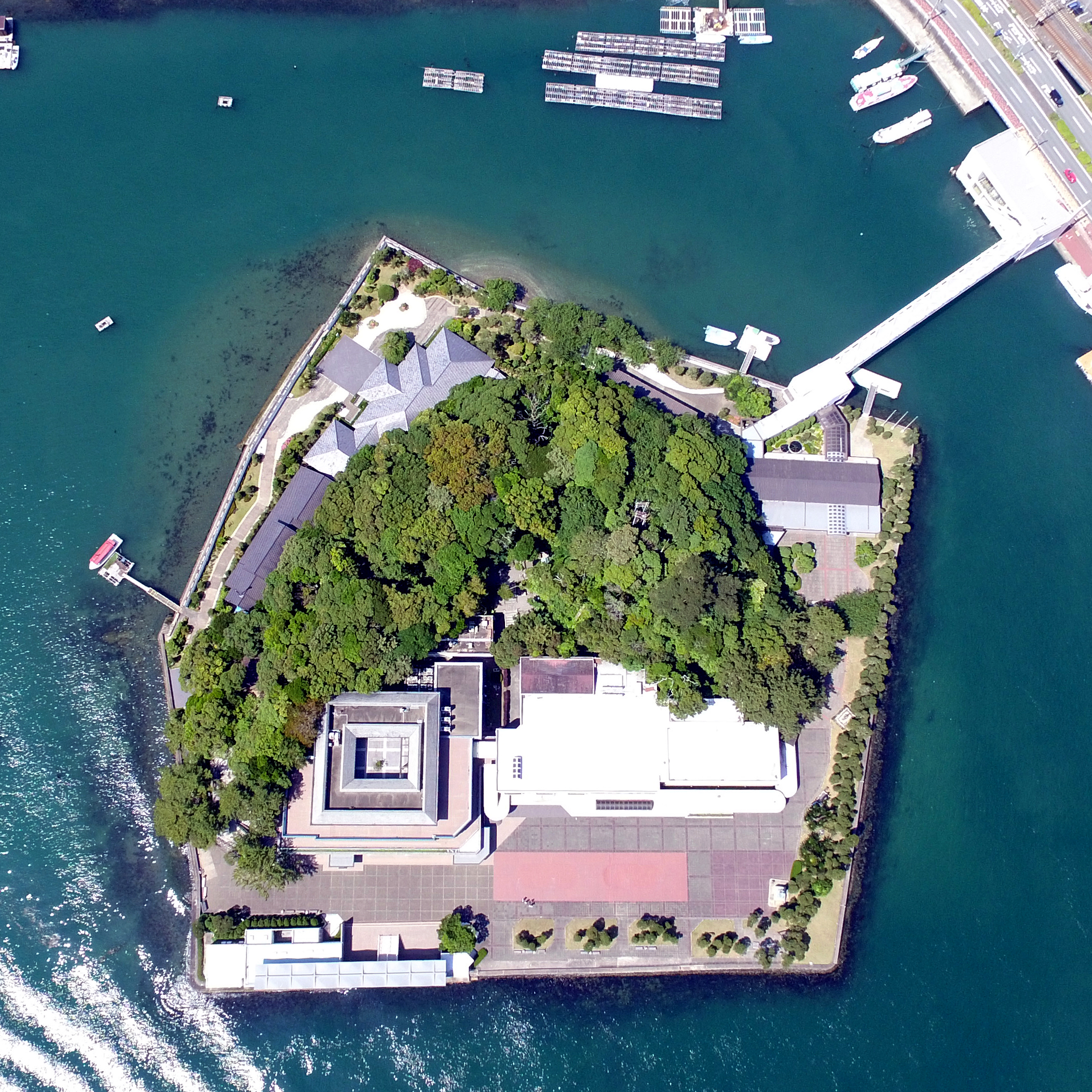
Mikimoto Pearl Island

Mikimoto Pearl Island (ミキモト真珠島, Mikimoto-Shinju-Jima) is a small island in Ise Bay, offshore Toba, Mie Prefecture, Japan. The island is known as the birthplace of cultured pearl aquaculture.

The island is owned by Mikimoto Pearl Museum Co., Ltd. (株式会社ミキモト真珠島, Kabushiki-Gaisha-Mikimoto-Shinju-Jima), which operates the island as a tourist attraction, exhibiting pearls and pearl craft goods, and holding shows featuring ama divers.

== History ==
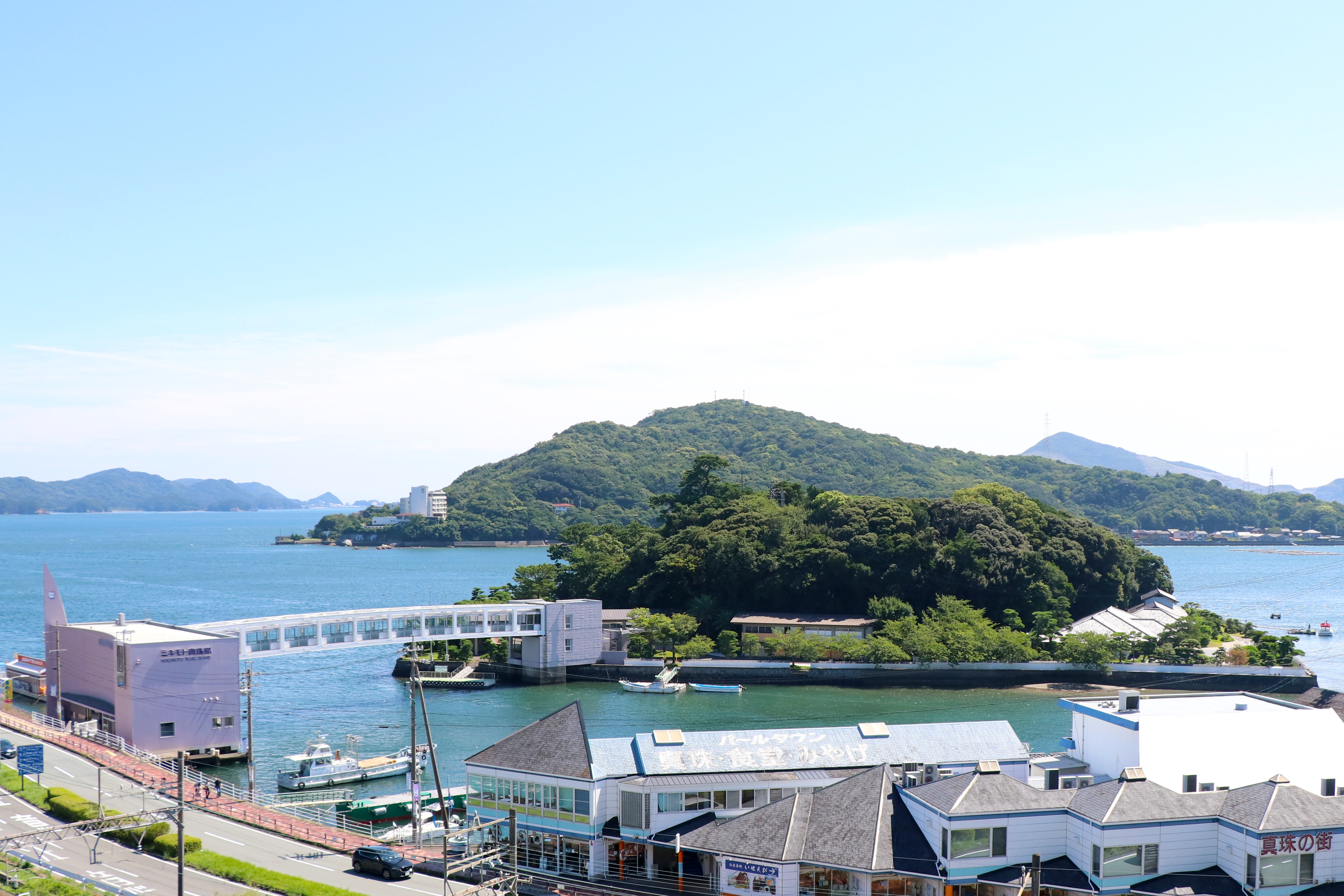
Mikimoto Pearl Island from the Toba castle grounds.

In 1893, Mikimoto Kōkichi, a local entrepreneur, succeeded in producing cultured pearls on an island in Ise Bay called Ojima (相島). In 1919, the island was sold by the town of Toba to Teikoku Kisen Shipping Company but was purchased back by Toba in 1927. It was resold to Mikimoto Kōkichi in 1929, with the funds used to establish an elementary school. Mikimoto developed the island as a center for pearl production.

In 1951, Mikimoto renamed it Mikimoto Pearl Island and set up a company to develop it for tourism. A commemorative museum of the life of Mikimoto was established in 1958 and a Pearl Museum in 1962. A bridge connecting the island to the mainland was completed in 1970.

The Pearl Museum was rebuilt in 1985 and the Mikimoto Museum in 1993.

== Facilities ==
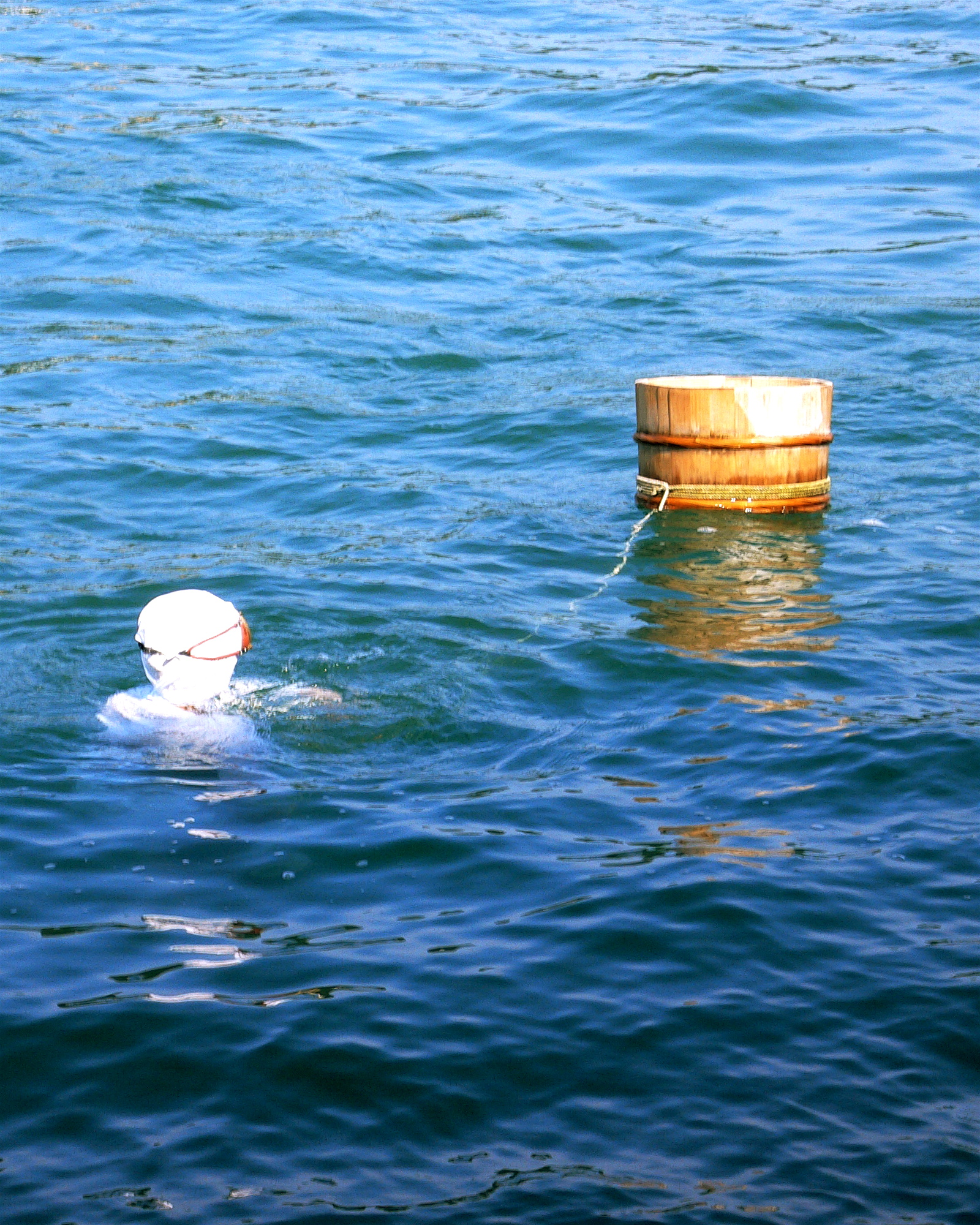
One scene of an ama diver's show

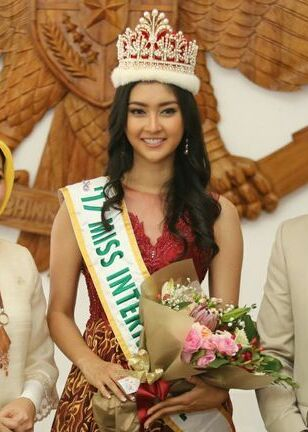
The Mikimoto Pearl Crown, as worn by Miss International 2017, Kevin Lilliana of Indonesia.

=== Pearl Museum ===
The Pearl Museum contains various artifacts and replicas of items made with pearls. Highlights of the museum's collection include:

- Obidome-Yaguruma (帯留矢車), an obidome for a kimono that was exhibited at Exposition Internationale des Arts et Techniques dans la Vie Moderne in 1937. It was made from 41 pearls, diamonds, sapphires, emeralds, platinum and 18 carat gold. By rearranging its components, it is possible to make 12 accessories such as brooches, hair ornaments, and rings.
- A globe made from 12,541 pearls, 377 rubies, and 373 diamonds. Its diameter is 33 cm.
- A replica of the 1939 New York World's Fair's Liberty Bell, made from 12,250 pearls and 366 diamonds.
- Mikimoto's Five-Storied Pagoda (御木本五重塔, Mikimoto Gojū-no-Tō), a model pagoda that was exhibited at the Sesquicentennial Exposition in Philadelphia. It was made from 12,760 pearls.
- A 1/90 scale miniature reproduction of Himeji Castle, made of 19,000 pearls, 447 diamonds, and several other sapphires, emeralds, and rubies.
- "Pearl Crown I", a crown styled after the state crown of Queen Mary used at the coronation of King George V in 1911. It was made of 872 pearls and 188 diamonds.
- A 650 Mikimoto Akoya pearls crown of the Miss International Crown, designed by Tomohiro Yamaji
- Miss Universe Mikimoto Crown
- A gunbai war fan that was exhibited at Encouragement of Industry Exposition Tokyo at 1907 and at the Japan–British Exhibition in London in 1910. Styled as a Korean fan as presented to Hideyoshi, it was made from 515 natural and 290 cultured pearls.

=== Mikimoto Kōkichi Memorial Hall ===
Mikimoto Kōkichi Memorial Hall contains exhibits on the life Mikimoto Kōkichi. Among its exhibits is a reproduction of the udon shop "Awakō" (阿波幸), where he was born.

=== Others ===
The island also contains a bronze sculpture of Mikimoto Kōkichi, the Shrine of Pearl, the Forest of Wild Birds and Observatory, the restaurant "Awakō," and a pearl shop.

== Access ==
The island is a five-minute walk from Toba Station (Kintetsu Toba Line and JR Sangū Line).
