= Kokichi Mikimoto =

Japanese entrepreneur (1858–1954)

- 御木本 幸吉
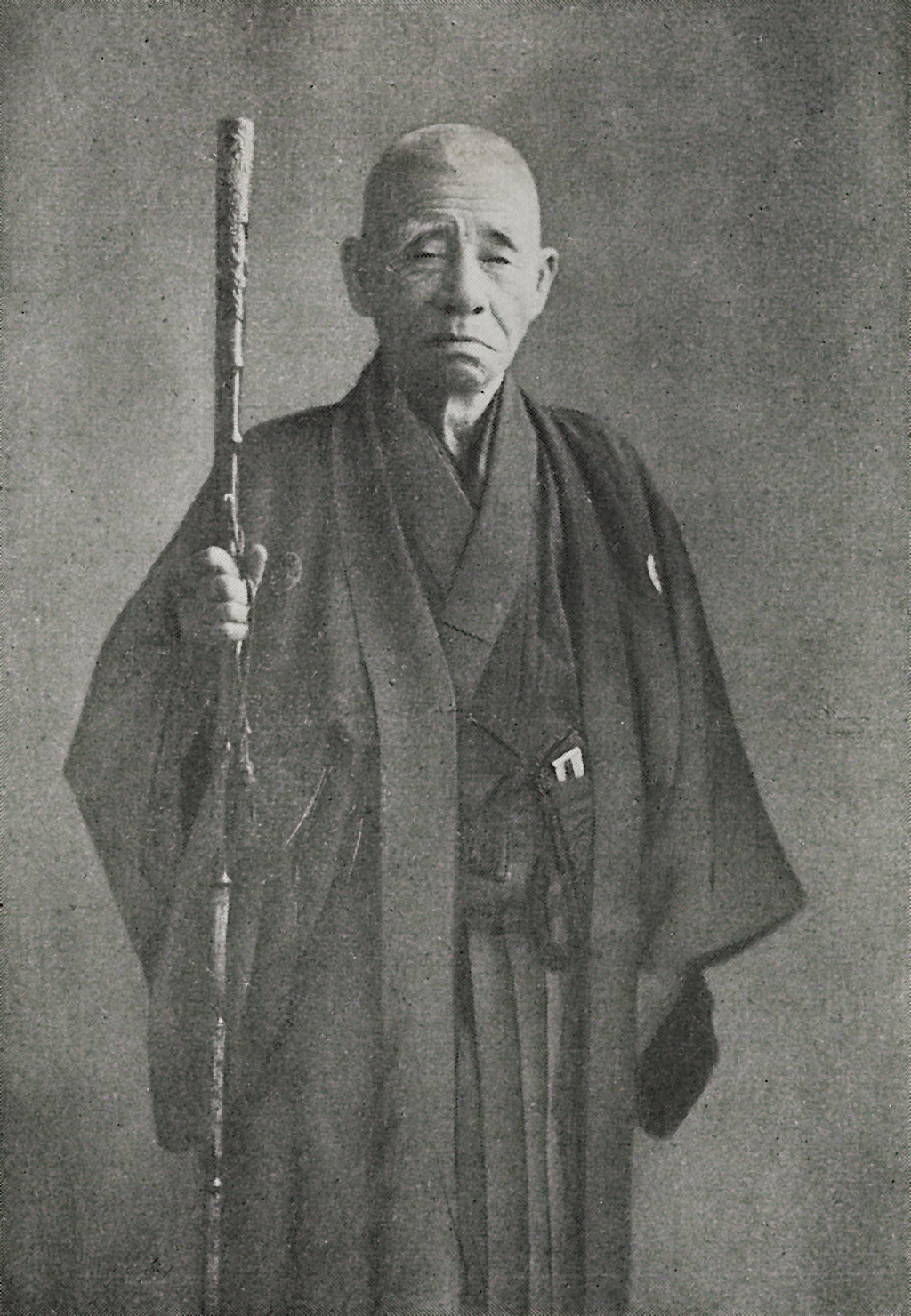
- Born: 25 January 1858; Toba, Shima Province, Japan
- Died: 21 September 1954 (aged 96)
- Resting place: Aoyama Cemetery, Tokyo
- Occupations: Cultured pearl farmer; entrepreneur
- Known for: Inventor of cultured pearls; The Mikimoto Crown; Miss International crown
- Awards: Grand Cordon of the Order of the Sacred Treasure (posthumous)

Kokichi Mikimoto (Japanese: 御木本 幸吉, Hepburn: Mikimoto Kōkichi; 25 January 1858 – 21 September 1954) was a Japanese entrepreneur who is credited with creating the first cultured pearl and subsequently starting the cultured pearl industry with the establishment of his luxury pearl company Mikimoto.

He was inducted into the House of Peers by imperial decree and posthumously awarded the Grand Cordon of the Order of the Sacred Treasure. On 18 April 1985, the Japan Patent Office selected him as one of Ten Japanese Great Inventors.

The company was ranked as one of the world's most luxurious brands by Women's Wear Daily Magazine and Mikimoto was considered one of the best Japanese financial leaders of the 20th century by Nihon Keizai Shimbun. He is also known as the founder of Mikimoto Pharmaceuticals, a company specialising in beauty products containing pearl calcium. Mikimoto Pearl Island is named after him. In addition, the "Phoenix Mikimoto Crown" used by Miss Universe winners as well as the pageant crown used by Miss International is credited to his patented work.

== Early life ==
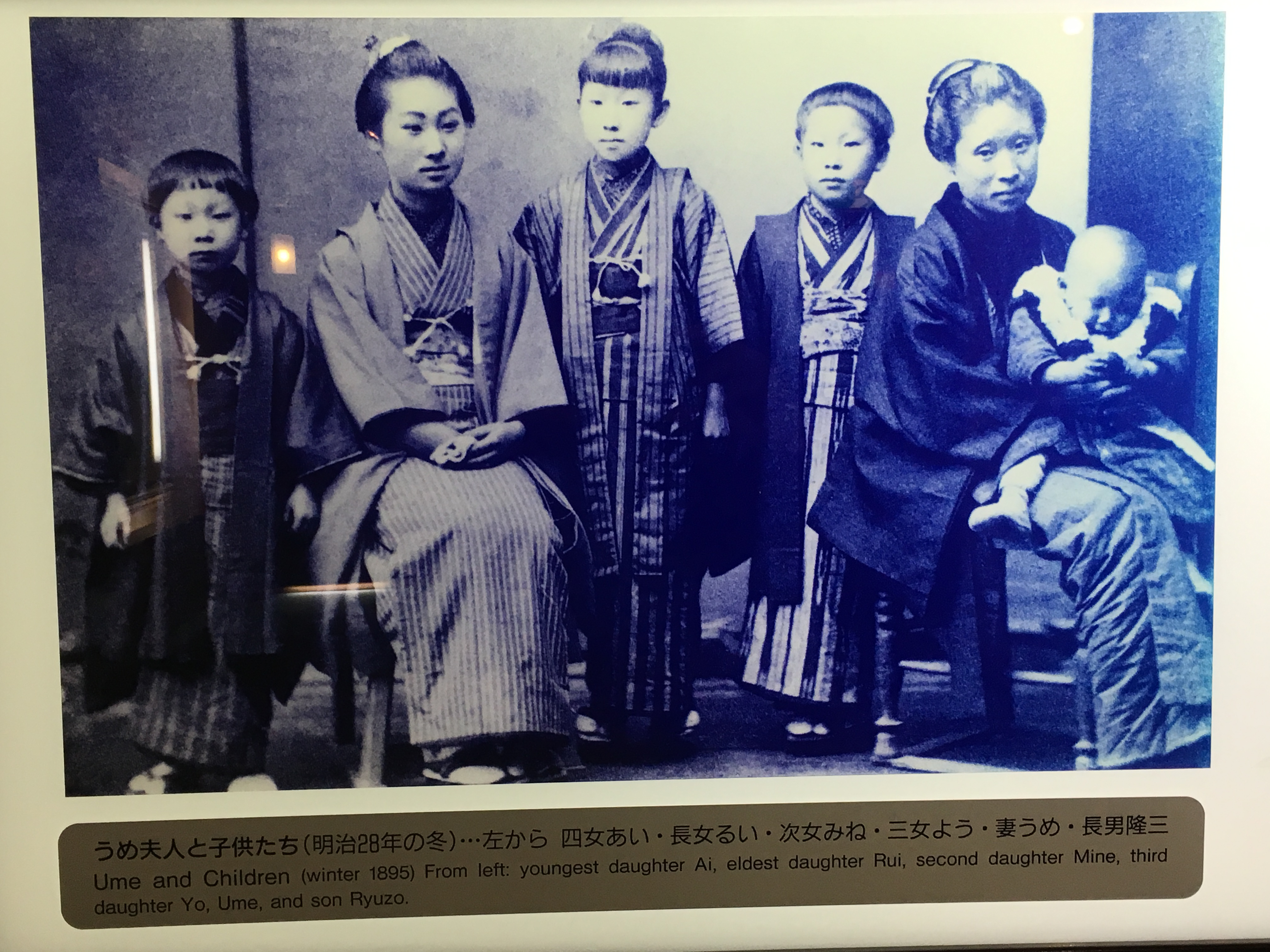
The wife of Mikimoto, Ume and his children in winter of 1895.

Mikimoto was born 25 January 1858 in Toba, Shima Province (now Mie Prefecture). Mikimoto's father was an udon shop owner. Mikimoto was the eldest son. At age 11, Mikimoto's father fell ill. He left school at the age of 13 and sold vegetables to support his family. Seeing the pearl divers of Ise unloading their treasures at the shore in his childhood started his fascination with pearls. At the age of 20, Mikimoto noticed the many flaws of pearls as he judged a pearl exhibition in 1878. This began Mikimoto's search for the development of the perfect pearl.

== Pioneering cultured pearls ==
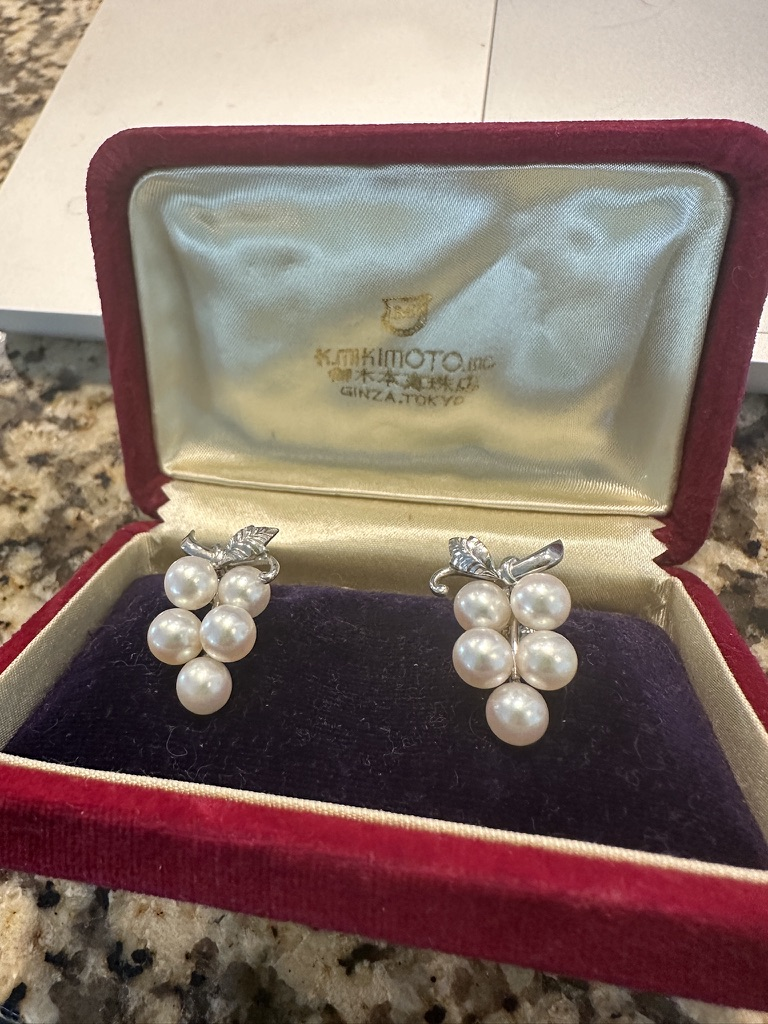
Mikimoto pearl earrings c.1970

Mikimoto began his search of an alternative method to produce pearls as the chairman of the Shima Marine Products Improvement Association. At this point the demand for pearls had severely outweighed the supply, prompting the consideration of an effort to protect the oysters.

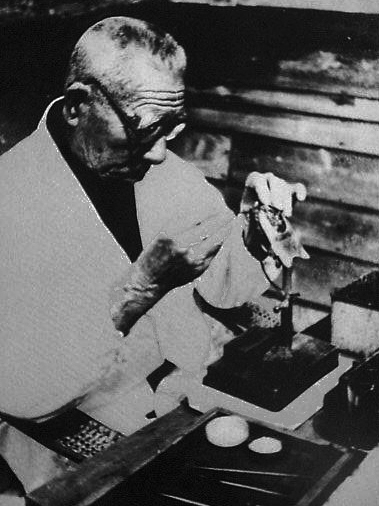
Mikimoto inserts nucleus in a pearl shell

In 1888, Mikimoto obtained a loan to start his first pearl oyster farm at the Shinmei inlet on Ago Bay in Mie prefecture with his wife and partner Ume. On 11 July 1893, after many failures and near bankruptcy, he was able to create the hemispherical cultured pearls. The pearls were made by seeding the oyster with a small amount of mother of pearl. Despite this major discovery there were initially difficulties in selling his cultured pearls due to public confusion. To encourage sales, Mikimoto opened a jewelry boutique in Ginza where he was able to have workers educate the consumer on the nature of the cultured pearls. He introduced these pearls at a marine products exposition in Norway in 1897 and began an export business. However, it took him another 12 years to create completely spherical pearls that were indistinguishable from the highest quality natural ones, and commercially viable harvests were not obtained until the 1920s. In 1927, Mikimoto met with inventor Thomas Edison, who was in awe of Mikimoto's cultured pearls as it was "supposed to be biologically impossible".

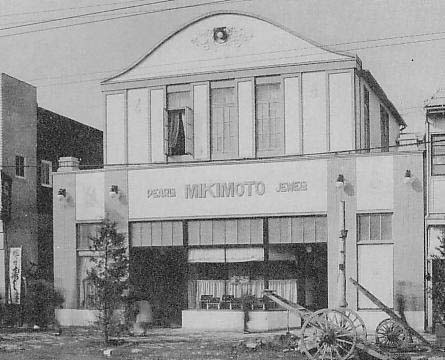
Mikimoto building in Tokyo, Taishō period.

Mikimoto did not know that government biologist Tokichi Nishikawa and a carpenter, Tatsuhei Mise, had each spent time in Australia and learned the secret to spherical pearl production from expatriate British marine biologist William Saville-Kent – inserting a piece of oyster epithelial membrane (the lip of mantle tissue) with a nucleus of shell or metal into an oyster's body or mantle causes the tissue to form a pearl sack. The sack produces nacre, which coats the nucleus, thus creating a pearl. Mise received a 1907 patent for this grafting needle. When Nishikawa applied in the same year, he realized that Mise had already secured a patent. In a compromise, the pair agreed to cooperate, calling their discovery the "Mise-Nishikawa method".

Mikimoto had received a patent in 1896 for producing hemispherical pearls, or mabes, and a 1908 patent for culturing in mantle tissue, but he could not use the Mise-Nishikawa method without invalidating his own patents. Mikimoto then altered his patent application to cover a technique to make round pearls in mantle tissue, which was granted in 1916. However, this method was not commercially viable. Mikimoto finally made arrangements to use Nishikawa's methods after 1916, and Mikimoto's business began to expand rapidly.

== Industry success ==
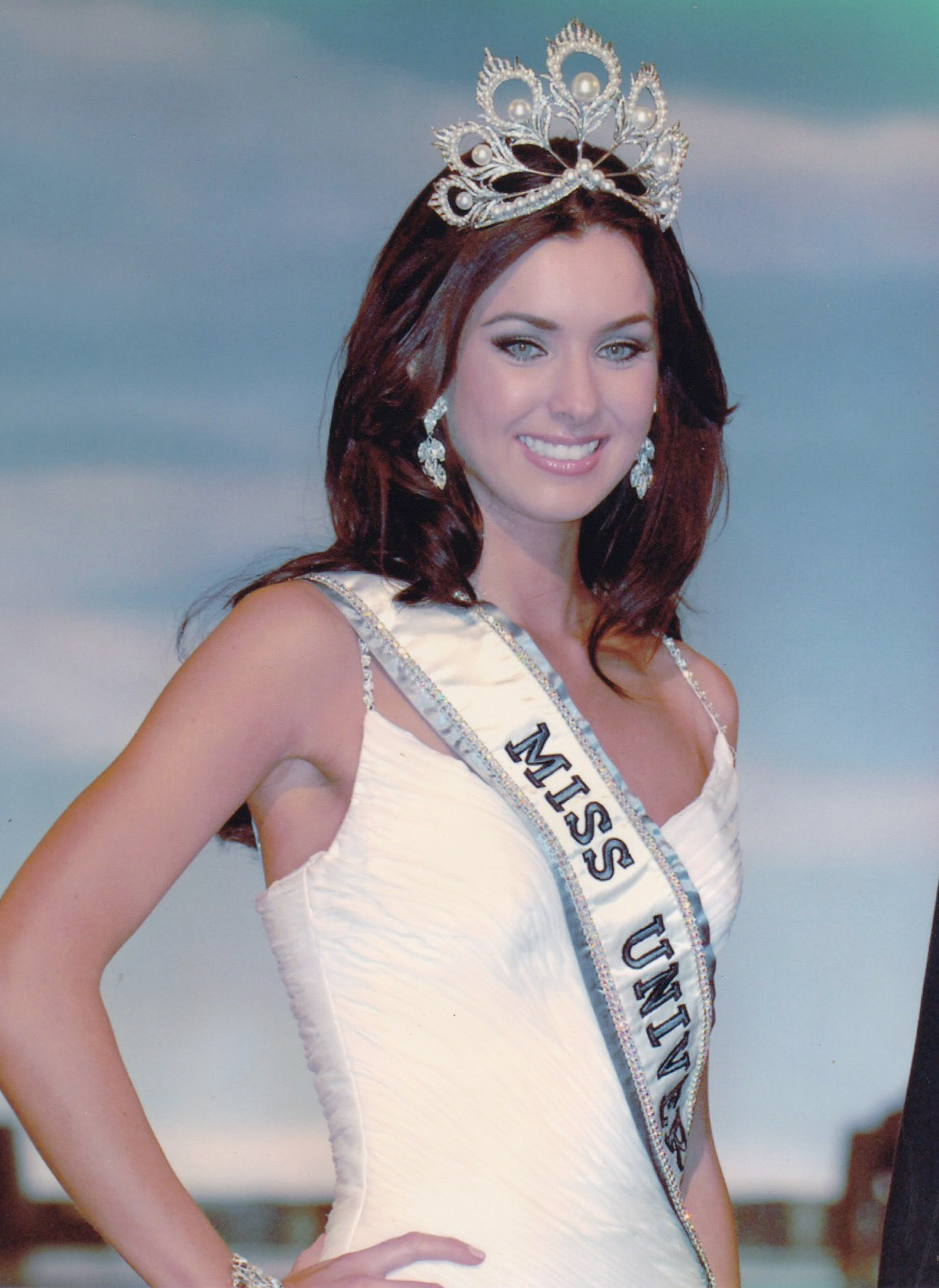
The 54th Miss Universe wearing the illustrious Mikimoto Crown in 2005 (Press photography). Bangkok, Thailand.

The new technology enabled Japan's cultured pearl industry to quickly expand after 1916; by 1935 there were 350 pearl farms in Japan producing 10 million cultured pearls annually.

=== Mikimoto Pearl Company ===
In 1899, the first Mikimoto pearl shop opened in the fashionable Ginza district of Tokyo selling natural seed pearls and half round pearls. The Mikimoto business expanded internationally, opening stores in London (1913).

By 1935, the Japanese pearl industry was facing oversupply issues and plummeting prices for Japanese cultured pearls. Mikimoto promoted Japanese pearls in Europe and the US to counteract falling prices. He publicly burned tons of low-quality pearls as a publicity stunt to establish a reputation that the Mikimoto company only sold high-quality cultured pearls.

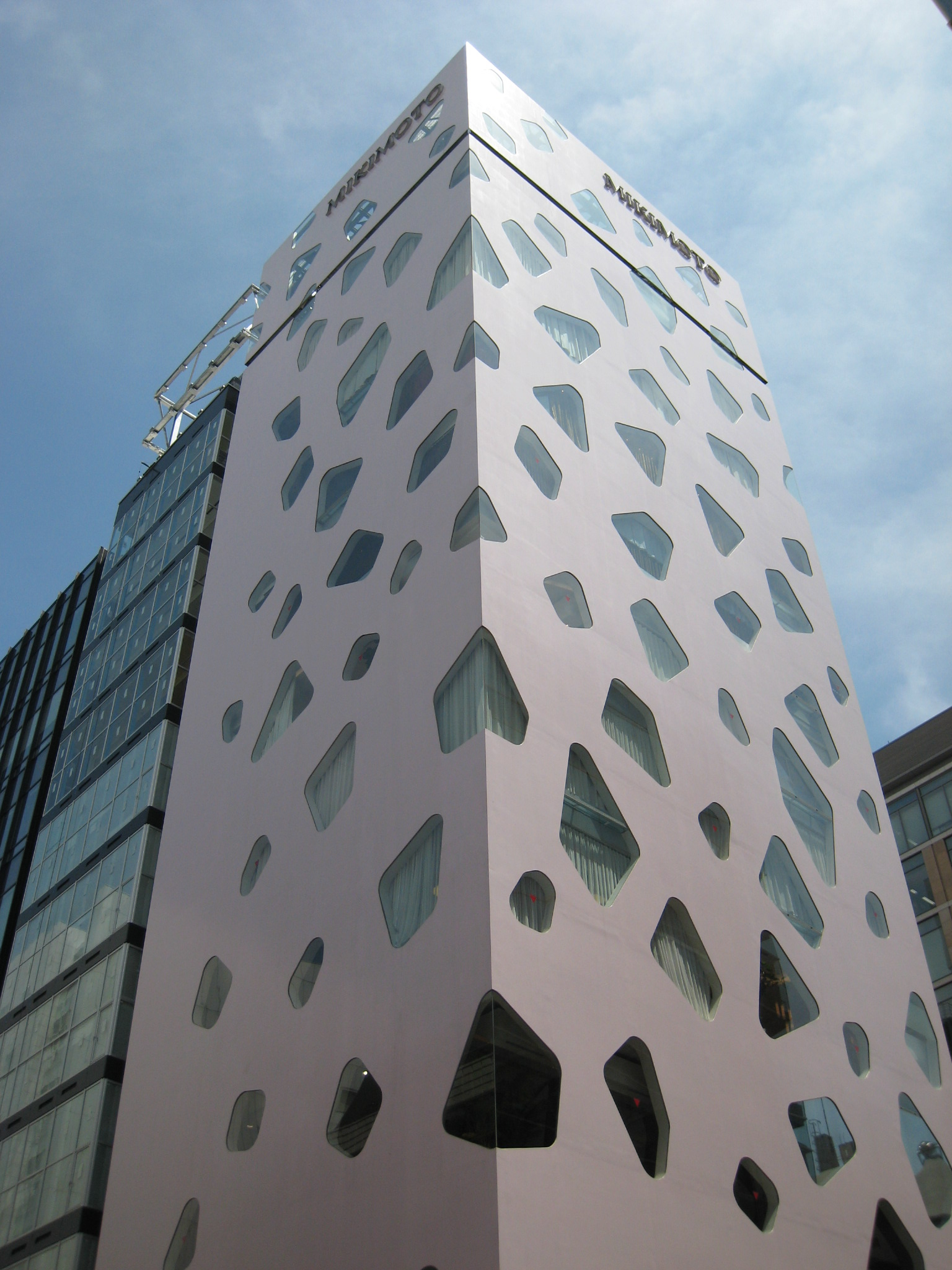
The Mikimoto store in Ginza, Chūō, Tokyo

After World War II, Mikimoto opened stores in Paris, New York City, Chicago, Boston, Los Angeles, San Francisco, Shanghai, and Bombay, and was thus one of the first Japanese brands to attain an international presence and recognition.

Mikimoto had to constantly fight allegations that his pearls were only "imitations" of real pearls, despite scientific reports to the contrary. Mikimoto took advantage of every opportunity to personally promote his pearls, and took part in the 1926 Philadelphia World Exposition in which he displayed a replica of the "Liberty Bell" covered with pearls.

Mikimoto was the official jeweler of the Miss USA (2003–2008), Miss Universe (2002–2007 and 2017–2019) and Miss Teen USA (2002–2008) pageants, under the Miss Universe Organization.

In 2010–11, the company's estimated total sales were €300 million.

In June 2013, the company was chosen to design a five-piece parure consisting of a brooch, necklace, earrings, bracelet and the state diadem for Princess Kako of Akishino's 20th birthday anniversary, valued at ¥30 Million JPY (US$279,000). The illustrious tiara features both floral motif and national symbols of Japan.

== Personal life ==
Mikimoto's wife was Ume, who was also his partner in creating the cultured pearl. Mikimoto and his wife have five children: Rui (eldest daughter), Mine (second daughter), Yo (third daughter), Ai (youngest daughter), and Ryuzo (son).

On 21 September 1954, Mikimoto died at the age of 96. Mikimoto's personal memorabilia are displayed at Mikimoto Pearl Island Memorial Hall, a museum in Toba, Japan.

== See also ==
- Cultured freshwater pearls
- Ama (diving)
