= Mikimoto Crown =

Pageant crown worn by Miss Universe titleholders

Phoenix Mikimoto Crown

Details
- Made: 2000 (designed); 2002 (current version)
- Owner: Miss Universe Organization
- Weight: 1.06 kg (2.3 lb)
- Arches: Two
- Material: Yellow gold White gold
- Notable stones: Natural colorless Diamonds; South Sea pearls Akoya pearls

The Phoenix Mikimoto Crown, (Kanji: 御木本不死鳥王冠) also informally known as the Mikimoto Crown, is a pageant crown that was worn by Miss Universe titleholders.

The crown was made by the Mikimoto Pearl company in Toba, Mie Prefecture, Japan used by the Miss Universe Organization. Its usage was preceded by a modernised variant design of the traditional Lady Crown used since the 1960s.

It is widely considered the most iconic crown coveted in the world of beauty pageants.

== History ==
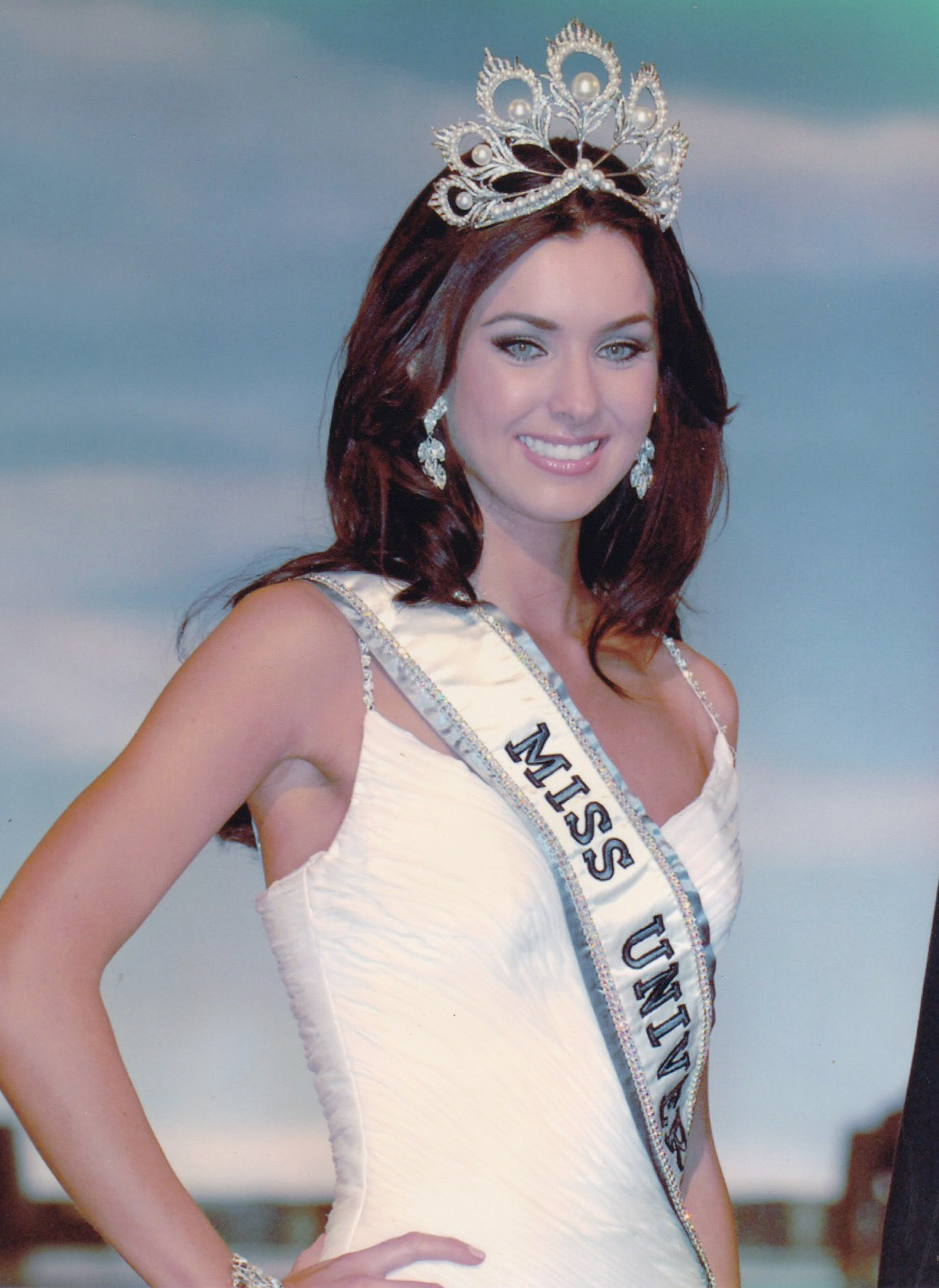
The 54th Miss Universe wearing the crown in 2005 (Press photography)

The crown was designed by Japanese artisan Tomohiro Yamaji in 2000 and was created with the sponsorship of the Mikimoto Pearl company in 2002 for the commemorative 50th anniversary and as the official jewel sponsor of the Miss Universe Organization. It accompanied a similar diadem which was given to the winner after her reign. It was first unveiled and worn by the 50th Miss Universe at the Fifth Avenue Mikimoto store in New York City by former Miss Universe Organization owner Donald Trump and former brand president, Toyohiko Miyamoto.

The crown was used for the coronations of 2002–2007. Due to inconsistent payments for copyright use by the Czech-based Diamond International Corporation to the Miss Universe Organization, along with the desire to re-establish lost branding prestige, the crown returned in January 2017 (press photography), November 2017 (coronation night) and December 2018 (coronation night).

The Mikimoto crown was last used at the 68th Miss Universe pageant, the last time being worn by the 67th Miss Universe for its coronation night.

== Description ==
The Mikimoto crown is made of both yellow and white gold, measuring from three to eighteen millimetres. It has a traditional Asian design based on the seven auspicious feathers of a Fenghuang phoenix using a mandorla flame design derived from traditional Japanese Buddhist iconography. The crown is decorated with diamonds totalling to 18 carats, with 120 naturally white pearls obtained in Japan, both South Sea and Akoya, giving a grand total weight of 29.7 carats. Due to its delicate nature, a security detail was attached to the crown wherever it traveled and insured for $250,000 USD against the risk of loss or damage.

== List of Miss Universes who have worn the crown ==
The following winners are certified by press release or official publication to have worn the Phoenix Mikimoto Crown as designated by the Miss Universe Organization:

| Year worn | Country / Territory | Titleholder |
|---|---|---|
| 2001 | Puerto Rico | Denise Quiñones (Note: The Mikimoto Crown was first worn by the 50th Miss Universe, Denise Quiñones in 2001 at its store presentation at the Mikimoto store branch in New York, United States. It was then officially worn at the Intercontinental Hotel in San Juan, Puerto Rico on 25 May 2002.) |
| 2002 | Panama | Justine Pasek (Note: Justine Pasek inherited the crown after Oxana Fedorova, Miss Russia, was dethroned after reigning for 3 months.) |
| 2002 | Russia | Oxana Fedorova |
| 2003 | Dominican Republic | Amelia Vega |
| 2004 | Australia | Jennifer Hawkins |
| 2005 | Canada | Natalia Glebova |
| 2006 | Puerto Rico | Zuleyka Rivera |
| 2007 | Japan | Riyo Mori |
| 2008 | Venezuela | Dayana Mendoza (Note: Dayana Mendoza wore the crown for most of her reign, including the coronation night of the Miss Universe 2009 and Miss USA pageant.) |
| 2015 | Philippines | Pia Wurtzbach |
| 2017 | South Africa | Demi-Leigh Nel-Peters |
| 2018 | Philippines | Catriona Gray |

== See also ==
- Mikimoto Pearl Island
